= List of Japanese musical groups (2010s) =

This is a List of Japanese musical groups that debuted in the 2010s.

See also the list of groups that debuted in the 1990s, 2000s and 2020s.

== 2010 ==
- Alexandros (then known as Champagne)
- ClariS
- Danceroid
- Dorothy Little Happy
- Ebisu Muscats
- Frederic
- French Kiss
- Gacharic Spin
- Keytalk
- Kishida Kyoudan & The Akeboshi Rockets
- Man with a Mission
- Negoto
- NYC
- Passpo
- Rootless
- Sakura Gakuin
- Sandaime J Soul Brothers
- SDN48
- Sekai no Owari
- Shinsei Kamattechan
- Super Girls
- Tokyo Girls' Style
- Tokyo Shoegazer
- White Ash
- World Order
- YuiKaori

== 2011 ==
- Altima
- Bis
- Candy Go!Go!
- Czecho No Republic
- Diaura
- Diva
- Dream Morning Musume
- E-girls
- Earthbound Papas
- Egoist
- Fairies
- Flower
- Happiness
- Houkago Princess
- Kamen Rider Girls
- Kis-My-Ft2
- Lama
- LinQ
- Mejibray
- N Zero
- NMB48
- Not Yet
- Passepied
- Predia
- Queen Bee
- Sea*A
- Sexy Zone
- Shiritsu Ebisu Chugaku

== 2012 ==
- A.B.C-Z
- Abcho
- Ace of Spades
- Air Swell
- Alma Kaminiito
- Anna S
- Babymetal
- Babyraids Japan
- Band Ja Naimon!
- Bakusute Sotokanda Icchome
- Bridear
- Clear's
- Cyntia
- Dancing Dolls
- Doll$Boxx
- Exile The Second
- Exile Tribe
- Eyelis
- For Tracy Hyde
- Generations from Exile Tribe
- Haruka to Miyuki
- Hello Sleepwalkers
- Iris
- Kyuso Nekokami
- Lovely Doll
- Lyrical School
- My First Story
- Nocturnal Bloodlust
- Nogizaka46
- Party Rockets GT
- Prizmmy
- Puretty
- Rabbit
- Ryutist
- Silent Siren
- StylipS
- Sweet ARMS
- Sweety
- Team Shachi
- Tone Jewel
- Tricot
- Ultra Girl (band)
- Up Up Girls Kakko Kari

== 2013 ==
- All City Steppers
- AŌP
- Ayumikurikamaki
- BRADIO
- Busaiku
- Charisma.com
- Cheeky Parade
- Cö Shu Nie
- Cream
- Da-ice
- Dance Earth Party
- Desurabbits
- Dish
- Doll Elements
- Especia
- Fhána
- Gesu no Kiwami Otome
- HKT48
- HR
- Juice=Juice
- Jupiter
- Kana-Boon
- Lovendor
- M Three
- Mimi Meme Mimi
- Natsuiro
- Otome Shinto
- Scenarioart
- Screen Mode
- Shishamo
- Sunmyu
- Tempura Kidz
- The Oral Cigarettes
- Tsuri Bit
- WHY@DOLL
- You'll Melt More!
- Yumemiru Adolescence

== 2014 ==
- Ame no Parade
- Band-Maid
- Chelsy
- Color-code
- Country Girls
- Doberman Infinity
- Flap Girls' School
- Flower Flower
- Folks
- Garnidelia
- GEM
- Hanafugetsu
- Happy
- Johnny's West
- Little Glee Monster
- Maison Book Girl
- Masochistic Ono Band
- Mili
- Necronomidol
- Niji no Conquistador
- Passcode
- Pla2me
- Real
- Rev. from DVL
- Sukekiyo
- Sumika
- The fin.
- Tokyo Performance Doll
- Wagakki Band
- Wanima
- X21
- Ykiki Beat

== 2015 ==
- 2o Love to Sweet Bullet
- 3776
- Akishibu Project
- Billie Idle
- Bish
- Earphones
- Ebisu Muscats
- Idol Renaissance
- Iginari Tohoku San
- Kamiyado
- Kolme
- La PomPon
- Ladybaby
- lol
- POP
- Magnolia Factory
- Mrs. Green Apple
- Myth & Roid
- Official Hige Dandism
- OxT.
- Pasocom Music Club
- Pentagon
- Srv.Vinci
- Sora tob sakana
- Suchmos
- Tacoyaki Rainbow
- Tokimeki Sendenbu
- The Hoopers
- The Peggies
- TrySail
- Wednesday Campanella
- Days no mo (Formerly Whiteeeen)

== 2016 ==
- 3B junior
- Banzai Japan
- Batten Girls
- Bis
- Chai
- chelmico
- DYGL
- FEMM
- FlowBack
- Gang Parade
- Hiragana Keyakizaka46
- Keyakizaka46
- Musubizm
- OnePixcel
- Poppin'Party
- Pyxis
- Reol
- Rock A Japonica
- Roselia
- ShuuKaRen
- Tempalay
- The Sixth Lie
- The World Standard
- Yahyel
- Zenbu Kimi no Sei da.

== 2017 ==
- =Love
- 22/7
- Atarashii Gakko!
- Brats
- Camellia Factory
- Cellchrome
- Chō Tokimeki Sendenbu
- CY8ER
- Cynhn
- Dimlim
- Faky
- Last Idol
- Leetspeak Monsters
- Lovebites
- Mellow Mellow
- Migma Shelter
- NGT48
- Novelbright
- Pink Babies
- Pink Cres.
- Polkadot Stingray
- Qumali Depart
- Qyoto
- Ryokuoushoku Shakai
- SudannaYuzuYully
- The Rampage from Exile Tribe
- Ukka
- Yorushika

== 2018 ==
- Crown Pop
- dps
- Empire
- Fantastics from Exile Tribe
- First Place
- Hachimitsu Rocket
- King & Prince
- Neo Japonism
- Raise A Suilen
- Spira Spica
- STU48
- Uijin
- Yoshimotozaka46
- Zutomayo

== 2019 ==
- ≠Me
- ALI
- Argonavis from BanG Dream!
- B.O.L.T
- Ballistik Boyz from Exile Tribe
- Beyooooonds
- Bis
- Carry Loose
- College Cosmos
- Dialogue
- Dos Monos
- DracoVirgo
- Girls²
- Hinatazaka46
- Honest Boyz
- King Gnu
- Mameshiba no Taigun
- @onefive
- Sard Underground
- Tebasaki Sensation
- Yoasobi
- ZOC

== See also ==
- List of Japanese musical groups (2020s)
