= List of Japanese musical groups (2020s) =

This is a List of Japanese musical groups that debuted in the 2020s.

See also the list of groups that debuted in the 1990s, 2000s, and 2010s.

== 2020 ==
- All at Once
- Arcana Project
- Beatcats
- Bin
- Chō Tokimeki Sendenbu
- Enjin
- Go to the Beds
- Inuwasi
- JO1
- Morfonica
- Murasaki
- Nemophila
- NiziU
- Orbit
- OWV
- Paradises
- Piggs
- Sakurazaka46
- SixTones
- Snow Man
- Zamb

== 2021 ==
- ≠Me
- ASP
- Be First
- HO6LA
- INI
- Mapa
- Naniwa Danshi
- Ocha Norma
- Octpath

== 2022 ==
- &Team
- ≒Joy
- Boysgroup
- ExWhyZ
- Fruits Zipper
- The Last Rockstars
- Lil League from Exile Tribe
- Metamuse
- MyGO!!!!!
- Ocha Norma
- Psychic Fever from Exile Tribe
- SG5
- Tonai Bousho
- Travis Japan
- XG

== 2023 ==
- Ave Mujica
- Bite a Shock
- Candy Tune
- DXTeen
- Hi-Fi Un!corn
- IMP.
- The Jet Boy Bangerz from Exile Tribe
- Kiss Kiss
- MiSaMo
- Moonchild

== 2024 ==
- Cutie Street
- F5ve
- Issue
- Mameshiba no Taigun Tonai Bousho a.k.a. MonsterIdol
- Me:I
- NCT Wish
- Nexz
- Number_i
- Sweet Steady

== 2025 ==
- Hana

== See also ==
- List of Japanese musical groups (2010s)
