= Seiko Oomori =

Japanese musician

Seiko Oomori 大森靖子
- Born: 18 September 1987 (age 38); Matsuyama, Ehime Prefecture, Japan
- Genres: J-pop; punk rock
- Years active: 2007–present
- Label: Avex Trax
- Spouse: Pierre Nakano (m. 2014; div. 2024)
- Website: oomoriseiko.info

Seiko Oomori (大森靖子, Ōmori Seiko; born 18 September 1987) is a Japanese singer-songwriter. Her musical career began in the underground music culture of Tokyo's Kōenji neighborhood, briefly playing in the punk band Kuchuu Moranko before going solo and releasing two independent albums until signing with major record label Avex Trax in 2014. Oomori's music style is influenced by idol culture and punk rock among other clashing musical styles, and she is considered one of the early pioneers of the "anti-idol" and alternative idol scenes led by groups like BiS that would eventually give way to the more popular Kawaii metal movement, utilizing shock value and performance art throughout the early parts of her career.

== Career ==
Born in Matsuyama, Ehime Prefecture, Oomori moved to Tokyo to attend Musashino Art University in Kodaira. Starting from 2007, Oomori performed in one of Kōenji's "live houses" named Muryoku Muzenji, singing while playing an acoustic guitar. In 2011, Oomori formed a band named "Seiko Oomori & The Pink Tokarev" (大森靖子＆THEピンクトカレフ). During her time in Kōenji, Oomori's music pushed back against the dominance of Japanese idols on the music charts, a style that Ian Martin of The Japan Times compares to Jun Togawa and Ringo Sheena. Oomori held multiple concerts within Tokyo, including a first appearance at the 2013 Tokyo Idol Festival, a venue she would continue to appear in. Her growing popularity attracted the attention of Avex Trax to offer a contract in 2014.

Oomori's first album with Avex Trax, Sennō, sees her depart from her guitar-wielding "anti-idol" image to explore other types of music by incorporating more electronic elements, but her lyrics still explore darker themes, similar to Avex Trax's other band BiS. Her subsequent albums saw her continue to adapt to a more mainstream-friendly style and adapting from even more genres. In 2018, Oomori created an idol group named ZOC (short for "zone of control") in which she was both a member and a producer. On 9 June 2021, ZOC released their first album PvP, a double-album produced by Oomori herself with additional contributions from Kenta Sakurai, the producer of now-defunct idol group Maison Book Girl. Later that year on 9 November, ex-BiS and Maison Book Girl member Megumi Koshouji debuted her new idol group MAPA with the full-length album Shitennou, produced entirely by Oomori.

== Personal life ==
Oomori announced in 2014 that she had gotten married, although she did not specify to whom. In 2020 she publicly revealed her husband's identity as Pierre Nakano of Ling Tosite Sigure, also the long-time drummer in her backing band. The couple have one son, who was born in 2015. On 18 August 2024, the day that would have been their tenth wedding anniversary, the couple announced their divorce through their respective social media accounts.

== Discography ==
Seiko Oomori discography
- Studio albums: 8
- EPs: 1
- Compilation albums: 2
- Singles: 10

=== Studio albums ===
Title	Album details	Peak position		
Title	Album details	JPN	JPN Comb (Note: The Oricon Combined Albums Chart was established on 24 December 2018.)	JPN Hot
Mahō ga Tsukaenai nara Shinitai (魔法が使えないなら死にたい)	Released: 20 March 2013; Label: Pink Records	—	—	—
Zettai Shōjo (絶対少女)	Released: 11 December 2013; Label: Pink Records	53	—	—
Sennō (洗脳)	Released: 3 December 2014; Label: Avex Trax	18	—	—
Tokyo Black Hole	Released: 23 March 2016; Label: Avex Trax	19	—	22
Kitixxxgaia	Released: 15 March 2017; Label: Avex Trax	10	—	25
Kusokawa Party (クソカワPARTY)	Released: 11 July 2018; Label: Avex Trax	9	—	12
Kintsugi	Released: 9 December 2020; Label: Avex Trax	35	45	—
Persona #1	Released: 7 July 2021; Label: Avex Trax	13	45	—
超天獄 (天 ver.)	Released: 26 October 2022; Label: Avex Trax	24	42	—
This Is Japanese Girl	Released: 18 September 2024; Label: Avex Trax	29	—	26
"—" denotes a recording that did not chart or was not released in that territory.

=== Extended plays ===
Title	Album details
Pink	15 April 2012; Pink Records

=== Compilation albums ===
Title	Album details	Peak Position	
Title	Album details	JPN	JPN Comb (Note: The Oricon Combined Albums Chart was established on 24 December 2018.)
Muteki	27 September 2017	20	—
Seiko Oomori (大森靖子)	12 February 2020	31	24
"—" denotes a recording that did not chart or was not released in that territory.

=== Singles ===
Title	Year	Peak Position		
Title	Year	JPN	JPN Comb (Note: The Oricon Combined Singles Chart was established on 24 December 2018.)	JPN Hot
"Midnight Seijun Isei Kouyū" (清純異性交遊)	2014	178	—	—
"Kyuru Kyuru" (きゅるきゅる)	2014	20	—	32
"Magic Mirror/Sacchan no Sexy Curry" (マジックミラー/さっちゃんのセクシーカレー)	2015	20	—	49
"Aishiteru.com/Gekiteki Joy! Before After" (愛してる.com/劇的JOY!ビフォーアフター)	2016	26	—	93
"Pink Methuselah/Guttokuru Summer" (ピンクメトセラ/グッとくるSUMMER)	2016	51	—	—
"Positive Stress"	2016	51	—	—
"Orion Za/Yabatan Densetsu" (オリオン座/YABATAN伝説)	2016	26	—	—
"Draw(A)Drow"	2017	30	—	—
"Zettai Kanojo" (絶対彼女)	2019	24	35	—
"Re:Re:Love Oomori Seiko" (Re:Re:Love 大森靖子)	2019	19	41	—
"—" denotes a recording that did not chart or was not released in that territory.
