= Mapa (girl group) =

Japanese idol girl group

- Origin: Japan
- Genre: J-pop
- Years active: 2021–present
- Label: T-Palette Records
- Members: Megumi Coshoji; Mayo Ushiro; Yusura Shiō; Emu Jinzai; Kurumi Tōka; Misaki Midoriyama

Mapa (stylized in all caps) is a Japanese girl group that formed in September 2021. They released their debut album, Shitennō, in November 2021.

== History ==
On September 25, 2021, former Bis and Maison Book Girl member Megumi Coshoji announced that she would be joining a new idol group named Mapa. The group made their live debut with a four-member line-up at TIF on October 2. Their debut album, Shitennō, was released on November 9.

Their first single, "Qilin♡Time / Satie", was released on May 24, 2022. Their second single, "Calling box / Imōto", was released on November 9 to commemorate their first anniversary.

On February 7, 2023, their third single, "Kaiju Giga / Ladies Comic", was released, followed by their fourth single, "Summer Shooter / Lovepi", on July 25. On September 26, they released a split single with Metamuse. Their fifth single, "Snowbud / Bighouse", was released on December 19.

On January 13, 2024, Kurumi Tōka and Misaki Midoriyama joined the group. They released their second album, Siix Sence, on August 20.

On June 6, 2025, Mapa performed alongside Piggs and ZOCX at WACK in the UK Vol. 6 which took place at The Underworld in London. On June 18, they released their sixth single "Ame no Shiro / Keshi♡Gomu♡Magic".

== Members ==
- Megumi Coshoji (古正寺恵巳)
- Mayo Ushiro (宇城茉世)
- Yusura Shiō (紫凰ゆすら)
- Emu Jinzai (神西笑夢)
- Kurumi Tōka (刀歌くる美)
- Misaki Midoriyama (翠山みさ姫)

== Discography ==
=== Studio albums ===
Title	Album details	Peak positions	
Title	Album details	JPN	JPN Hot
Shitennō (四天王)	Released: November 9, 2021; Label: T-Palette; Formats: CD, digital download	47	53
Siix Sence	Released: August 20, 2024; Label: T-Palette; Formats: CD, digital download	23	24

=== Singles ===
Title	Year	Peak positions	Album
Title	Year	JPN	Album
"Qilin♡Time / Satie" (麒麟♡タイム/Satie)	2022	16	Siix Sence
"Calling box / Imōto" (Calling box/いもうと)	2022	23	Siix Sence
"Kaiju Giga / Ladies Comic" (怪獣Giga/レディースコミック)	2023	13	Siix Sence
"Summer Shooter / Lovepi" (Summer Shooter/らぶぴ)	2023	14	Siix Sence
"Ichigo Kanzen Hanzai / Neko no Kuni" (いちご完全犯罪/猫の国) with Metamuse	2023	8	Non-album single
"Snowbud / Bighouse"	2023	16	Siix Sence
"Ame no Shiro / Keshi♡Gomu♡Magic" (雨の城/Keshi♡Gomu♡Magic)	2025	11	Non-album single
"—" denotes releases that did not chart or were not released in that region.
