= Vanilla Beans (band) =

Japanese musical group

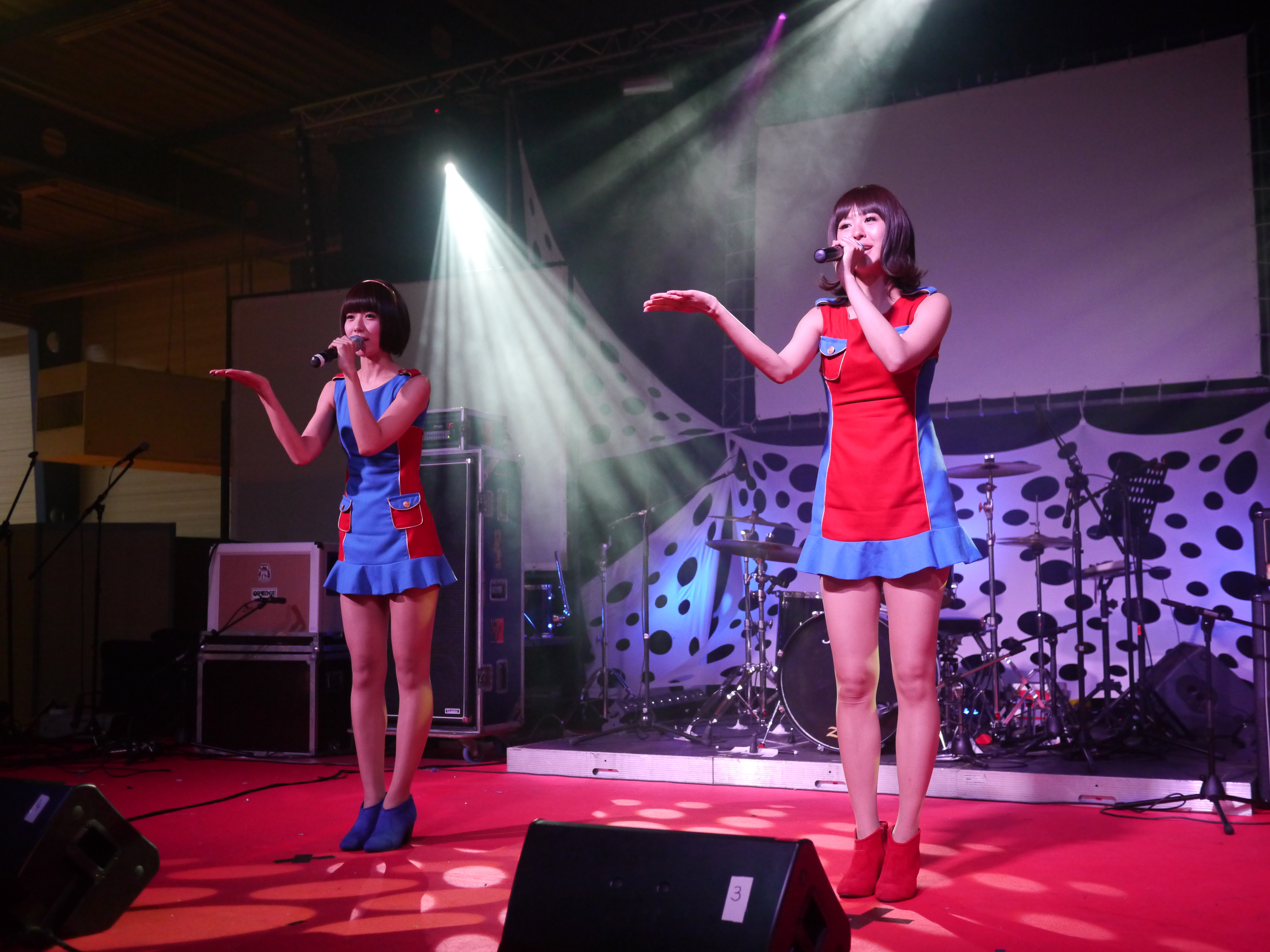
- The group performing at the Toulouse Game Show in France in December 2012

Background information
- Also known as: Vanibe
- Origin: Japan
- Genres: J-pop; dance; idol; shibuya-kei
- Years active: 2007 – 2018
- Labels: Flower Label (2007-2010); T-Palette Records (2011-2015); avex trax (2015-present)
- Members: Rena (2007-2018); Lisa (2008-2018)
- Past members: Rika (2007-2008)
- Website: www.flowerlabel.jp/vanillabeans/

Vanilla Beans (バニラビーンズ), also known as Vanibe, was a Japanese idol girl duo formed in 2007, under the indie label FLOWER LABEL, a sub-label of Tokuma Japan Communications.

Vanilla Beans has had the same line-up since March 2008, when Rika left and Risa joined. In June 2011 they joined the newly formed idol label T-Palette Records, to which they and Negicco were the first artists signed.

After four years under T-Palette Records, the band made its major debut in August 2015 signing a new contract with the popular avex trax label.

Rena, the original member, is a Japanese idol fan. She presents the show "Can't Stop Loving Idols!" (アイドル好きが止まらない!) posted on the Kawaii Girl Japan website. She conducts interviews and reports on other bands.

== History ==
=== 2007-2009 : The debut under Flower Label ===
Managed by the talent agency LesPros Entertainment, the band formed in mid-2007 by Rika and Rena, later a member of the group Idoling!!! under the independent label Flower Label, a sub-label of Tokuma Japan Communications. They describe themselves as a "next generation idol" group. Before recording songs though, the group visited the Embassy of Japan in Denmark on July 4, 2007, to come forward and present their concept and art projects to the Danes attending this event.

The group released their first single entitled "U ♡ Me" (reads "You love me") in two editions (regular and limited) on October 3, 2007 in Japan; the first steps to reach the top of the charts are difficult and the single only reached the 189th place on Oricon weekly Singles Chart and remained there only for a week. This is the only disc released by the original formation of the idol group.

In March 2008, Rika left this group after the first single, and soon after, the female group Idoling!!!, to devote herself to her studies. After an audition, another girl, Lisa (or Risa) joined the band and they recorded their second single "nicola" in one edition, released on May 21, 2008; but sales of the single also failed and only reached 198th place on the Oricon charts.

The band no longer recorded discs until the end of 2008 but was very present on the internet, publishing several singles in digital format.

The band released a third single, "Sakasaka Circus", in an edition on January 28, 2009, but it was not included on any ranking. On 25 February 2009 the eponymous debut studio album, "Vanilla Beans", was released; it contains the first three physical singles under Flower Label but it was not ranked on the Oricon chart. After these commercial failures, the group began to work better; the fourth single "LOVE & HATE", was released on September 9, 2009 in two versions: "Love Version" and "Hate Version"; it was ranked 79th place on the Oricon Weekly Singles Chart.

=== 2010-2011 : "Vanilla Beans II" and new contract with T-Palette Records ===
In 2010, the group recorded a mini-album "Def & Def", released in May and was ranked 79th place at Oricon Weekly Album Chart as the fourth single; it sold 1,155 copies during the first week. Furthermore, the first song of this EP, "D & D", was used in a commercial TV spot for deodorant brand of the same name, with the lyrics of the song changed. The members of the group appear in the promotional video.

For the 2010 FIFA World Cup held in South Africa, the song "Re-Sepp-Ten" was re-recorded by Vanilla Beans, who were known for their avid support of the Danish national team. The pop duo sang a slightly abbreviated version of the song in Danish, but with an unmistakable Japanese accent, despite the fact that Denmark and Japan were to meet in the final pool match to the finals. The release retitled "Re-Sepp-ten: Vi er røde, vi er hvide". A music video was made with the then-sitting Danish ambassador to Japan Franz-Michael Skjold Mellbin, playing the part of Preben Elkjær in the video. The music video was produced and directed by Emil Langballe.

At the end of the year, a compilation, "VaniBest" was released in September 2010, which ranked 160th place on Oricon and sold 887 copies during the first week of sale. "VaniBest" was the last album recorded under Flower Label Group; the band signed the following year, together with the idol group Negicco, a new contract with the idol label T-Palette Records in June 2011, which was newly founded by Ikuo Minewaki (President of Tower Records Japan). Soon after, Vanilla Beans impressed their fans with an unofficial single called "Tengoku e no Kaidan", released June 29, 2011. This is a cover song of "Stairway to Heaven" by British band Led Zeppelin and it marks the beginning of the group under their new label. This single was the first disc to be released under this label and it placed 82nd at Oricon. The song was also a promotion, the only single from the band's second album "Vanilla Beans II" which came out on July 20, 2011, but the album did not succeed to reach the best rankings during the first week since the album was ranked 110th on Oricon chart and remained classified only for a week. It was the first album released by T-Palette Records.

== Members ==
Current members

- Rena (レナ) (born in Shiga Prefecture)
- Lisa (リサ, or Risa) (born in Tokyo)

Former members

- Rika (リカ) (born on August 14, 1988); left the group in March 2008.

== Discography ==
=== Albums ===
Studio albums

| Title | Album details | Peak |
| Title | Album details | JPN |
|---|---|---|
| Vanilla Beans (バニラビーンズ) | Released: February 25, 2009; Label: Flower Label; Formats: CD; Tracklisting: 1. "Opening" (Instrumental); 2. "Sakasaka Circus"; 3. "U Love Me" (Rena & Risa Ver.); 4. "Happy Merry-Go-Round"; 5. "Kimagure na Palette Type"; 6. "Winter Has Gone"; 7. "Ashita wa Ashita no Natsu ga Kuru" (Album Ver.); 8. "Afternoon a Go-Go" (Album Ver.); 9. "Shopping Kirari" (Album Ver.); 10. "Nicola"; 11. "Vanillardo"; 12. "Ending (Instrumental)"; 13. "Encore (Afternoon a Go-Go / We Love You Mix)" (Remastering Ver.); 14. "Shopping Kirari (Okite Porsche + Dr. Usui Waterfront Mix)" (Remastering Ver.); 15. "Ashita wa Ashita no Natsu ga Kuru (Okite Porsche + Dr. Usui Death Techno Mix)" (Remastering Ver.) | — |
| Vanilla Beans II (バニラビーンズII) | Released: July 20, 2011; Label: T-Palette Records; Formats: CD; Tracklisting: 1. "VanillaBeans"; 2. "Erusukadi"; 3. "Nakaji Time"; 4. "Doctor, Onegai"; 5. "Summer Vacation"; 6. "?"; 7. "Oosumi Time"; 8. "Musunde Hiraite"; 9. "CHa-san no Uta"; 10. "Oppai"; 11. "Takami Time"; 12. "Sodermalm"; 13. "Yumemiru Shippo"; 14. "Oyasumi"; 15. "Tengoku e no Kaidan" | 110 |
| Vanilla Beans III (バニラビーンズIII) | Released: November 19, 2012; Label: T-Palette Records; Formats: CD; Tracklisting: 1. "Sukōne no Hana ga Saiteiru"; 2. "Sub Cal Girl Madoka"; 3. "Killer Queen"; 4. "Next Step Up"; 5. "Choco Mint Flavor Time" (Album Ver.); 6. "Mōsō Cafeteria"; 7. "Non-Section" (Album Ver.); 8. "Very Very Blueberry"; 9. "Toki no Kakera" (Album Ver.); 10. "Sekai no Owari" | 46 |
| Vanilla Beans IV (バニラビーンズIV) | Released: February 3, 2015; Label: T-Palette Records; Formats: CD; Tracklisting: 1. "Booby Boy Near Pin Girl"; 2. "Mada yo Boyfriend"; 3. "Muscat Slope Love"; 4. "Fōgeru o Vindo"; 5. "Tasogare High-ball"; 6. "Watashi... Fukō guse" 7. "Ai no Sei"; 8. "Please Me Darling"; 9. "Happy Day!!"; 10. "Kitto Ii Basho"; 11. "Uchōten Girl"; 12. "Funny Little Frog" | 50 |
| Vanilla Beans V (バビーンズV) | Released: February 3, 2016; Label: Avex Trax; Formats: CD; Tracklisting: 1. "Say Goodbye"; 2. "Onna wa Sore o Gaman shinai" 3. "Night and Fly"; 4. "Dare feat. Ram Rider"; 5. "Brand New Twilight"; 6. "Lady Survivor"; 7. "Boyz & Girlz"; 8. "Jōnetsu Violence"; 9. "Beanias"; 10. "Style and Council"; 11. "Lonesome X"; 12. "Now & Forever" | 43 |

Compilation albums

| Title | Album details | Peak |
| Title | Album details | JPN |
|---|---|---|
| Vani Best (ja) | Released: September 22, 2010; Label: Flower Label; Formats: CD; Tracklisting: 1. "Kids"; 2. "100-man-kai no SMK"; 3. "D & D"; 4. "Tokyo wa Yoru no Shichiji"; 5. "Love & Hate"; 6. "Koi no Theory"; 7. "Sakasaka Circus"; 8. "Nicola"; 9. "A Little Crying" (Rena & Risa Ver.); 10. "U Love Me" (Rena & Risa Ver.); 11. "Gamurasutan (All We Want To Do Is Rock)"; 12. "Hyakunin Isshu" (Kimi no Tame Ver.); 13. "Hyakunin Isshu" (Imaki Muto Ver.); 14. "Hyakunin Isshu" (Hisakata no Ver.); 15. "Hyakunin Isshu" (Ariake no Ver.) | 160 |
| Vani Best II | Released: December 18, 2017; Label: Avex Trax; Formats: CD; Tracklisting: 1. "Tokei Jikake no Wonderland"; 2. "U Love Me"; 3. "Nicola"; 4. "Sakasaka Circus"; 5. "Love & Hate"; 6. "Toki no Kakera"; 7. "Choco Mint Flavor Time"; 8. "Non-Section"; 9. "Muscat Slope Love"; 10. "Please Me Darling"; 11. "Koppu no Fuchi ko Kōshiki Song Kitto Ii Basho"; 12. "Uchōten Girl"; 13. "Onna wa Sore o Gaman shinai" 14. "Beanias"; 15. "Lonesome X"; 16. "Tōkyo wa Yoru no Shichiji (Yasuharu Konishi Remix); 17. "Nii! Saiken! Yodaredori!! (Bonus Track) | 77 |

=== Extended plays ===
| Title | Album details | Peak |
| Title | Album details | JPN |
|---|---|---|
| Def & Def (ja) | Released: March 19, 2010; Label: Flower Label; Formats: CD; Tracklisting: 1. "D & D"; 2. "Danzen! Futari wa PreCure Ver. Max Heart"; 3. "Happy Material"; 4. "Fushigi-iro Happiness"; 5. "Lalala (Kuchibiru ni Onegai o Komete)" | 79 |

=== Singles ===
Physical singles

| # | Title | Release date | Charts | Track listing |
| # | Title | Release date | Oricon Weekly Singles Chart | Track listing |
Physical singles
| 1 | U Love Me (U ♡ Me) | October 3, 2007 | 189 | U ♡ Me a little criying U ♡ Me (instrumental) a little criying (instrumental) |
| 2 | nicola (ニコラ) | May 21, 2008 | 198 | nicola Nostalgia nicola (instrumental); Nostalgia (instrumental) |
| 3 | Sakasaka Circus (サカサカサーカス) | January 28, 2009 | not ranked | Sakasaka Circus; Tic Tac; Sakasaka Circus (Instrumental); Tic Tac (Instrumental) |
| 4 | LOVE & HATE (LOVE & HATE) | September 9, 2009 | 79 | LOVE & HATE; Gamla stan Koi no Theory; Gamla stan (Rena Solo Ver.) (Love version); Gamla stan (Risa Solo Ver.) (Hate version); LOVE & HATE (Instrumental); Gamla stan (Instrumental); Koi no Theory (Instrumental) |
| ー | Tengoku e no Kaidan (天国への階段) | June 29, 2011 | 89 | Tengoku e no Kaidan; Baby Portable Rock nicola a little criying |
| 5 | Toki no Kakera (トキノカケラ) | January 18, 2012 | 34 | Toki no Kakera; Yes? No? Stop Rock'n'Roll (Rena ver.); Hoshi ni Natta Uso (Risa ver.); Toki no Kakera (instrumental); Yes? No? (instrumental) |
| 6 | Choco Mint Flavor Time (チョコミントフレーバータイム) | April 11, 2012 | 26 | Choco Mint Flavor Time; Hitotsu no Uta; Choco Mint Flavor Time (Instrumental); Hitotsu no Uta (instrumental) |
| 7 | Non-Section (ノンセクション) | July 4, 2012 | 31 | Non-Section; Himitsu; Kimi ga Boku wo Shitteru; Non-Section (Instrumental); Himitsu (instrumental) |
| 8 | Muscats Slope Love (マスカット・スロープ・ラブ) | May 8, 2013 | 32 | Muscats Slope Love; Jewel Memories; Muscats Slope Love (instrumental); Jewel Memories (instrumental) |
| 9 | Please Me, Darling (プリーズミー・ダーリン) | October 16, 2013 | 37 | Please Me, Darling; Night on the Earth; Please Me, Darling (instrumental); Night on the Earth (instrumental) |
| 10 | Watashi… Fukō Guse (ワタシ・・・不幸グセ) | April 23, 2014 | 55 | Watashi… Fukō Guse; Koi no Snipper 007; Watashi… Fukō Guse (instrumental); Koi no Snipper 007 (instrumental) |
| 11 | Kitto Ii Basho (Fuchi) / Zettai Panty Line (きっといい場所（フチ） / 絶対パンティーライン) | June 18, 2014 | 23 | Kitto Ii Basho (Fuchi); Zettai Panty Line; Kitto Ii Basho (Fuchi) (instrumental); Zettai Panty Line (instrumental) |
| 12 | Uchōten Girl (有頂天ガール) | November 11, 2014 | 40 | Uchōten Girl; Kiss wa Me ni Shite Bao! Uchōten Girl (instrumental); Kiss wa Me ni Shite Bao! (instrumental) |
| 13 | Onna wa Sore wo Gaman Shinai / Bi-nius / Lonesome X (女はそれを我慢しない / ビーニアス / lonesome X) | November 18, 2015 | 25 | Onna wa Sore wo Gaman Shinai; Bi-nius lonesome X Onna wa Sore wo Gaman Shinai (instrumental); Bi-nius (instrumental) lonesome X (instrumental) |
Digital singles
| # | Title | Release date | Album | Notes |
| 1 | Afternoon a Go-Go | August 27, 2008 | Vanilla Beans | |
| 2 | Afternoon a Go-Go ~We Love You MIX~ | September 24, 2008 | no album | |
| 3 | Shopping☆Kirari | October 29, 2008 | Vanilla Beans | |
| 4 | Shopping☆Kirari ~Okite Porsche + Dr.USUI Waterfront Mix~ | November 25, 2008 | no album | |
| 5 | Ashita wa Ashita no Natsu ga Kuru (あしたはあしたの夏がくる) | December 24, 2008 | Vanilla Beans | |
| 6 | Ashita wa Ashita no Natsu ga Kuru ~Dr.USUI Death Techno Mix~ (あしたはあしたの夏がくる) | January 28, 2009 | no album | |
| 7 | Koi no Theory (恋のセオリー) | April 9, 2009 | VaniBest | |
