= Sweetie =

Sweetie is a term of endearment. Sweetie or Sweety may refer to:

== People ==
- Sweety Boora, Indian boxer
- Sweetie Fox, Russian actress and model
- Sweety Sima Hembram, Indian politician
- Sweety Shetty, nickname of Indian actress Anushka Shetty

== Fictional characters ==
- Sweetie (internet avatar), a CGI child used by children's rights organization Terre des Hommes
- Sweetie, a character from Tiny Toon Adventures
- Sweetie, a character from the Diary of a Wimpy Kid series
- Sweety J. Dixit, a fictional character in the Dhoom franchise of Indian films, played by Rimi Sen
- Sweetie, from The Chicken Squad
- Sweetie, the main antagonist of the Mission Paw subseries of Paw Patrol

== Films ==
- Sweetie (1929 film), a college musical starring Helen Kane, Jack Oakie and Nancy Carroll
- Sweetie (1989 film), an Australian film

== Food ==
- Sweetie (apple), a trademarked New Zealand apple cultivar
- Oroblanco or sweetie, a fruit that is a cross between an acidless pummelo and a white grapefruit
- "Sweety", "sweetie" or "sweet", a slang term for confectionery

== Music ==
=== Artists ===
- Sweety, a Mandopop band
- Sweety (Japanese band)
- Saweetie, American rapper
- Sweetie Irie, British reggae singer and DJ born Dean Bent
- The Sweeties, or The Sweethearts of Sigma, an American trio of backing singers

=== Songs ===
- "Sweetie", by Carly Rae Jepsen
- "Sweetie", by Fumiko Orikasa
- "Sweetie", by Le Tigre
- "Sweety Sweety", by And One
