= Carry Loose (album) =

Studio album by Carry Loose
- Released: October 22, 2019
- Genre: J-pop
- Length: 53:21
- Language: Japanese
- Label: WACK, T-Palette Records

Carry Loose is the debut studio album from Japanese girl group Carry Loose. It was released on October 22, 2019, by T-Palette Records. The album consists of thirteen tracks including the title track, "Carry Loose".

== Track listing ==
No.	Title	Lyrics	Music	Length
1.	"Yasashii Sekai" (やさしい世界)	Uruu Ru	Satoshi Toyosumi	3:48
2.	"Carry Loose"	JxSxK	Ichiro Iguchi	4:14
3.	"Modoranaiyouni" (戻らないように)	JxSxK	Ichiro Iguchi	4:01
4.	"Anybody"	JxSxK, Satoshi Toyosumi	Satoshi Toyosumi	4:07
5.	"Cheer Song"	JxSxK	Satoshi Toyosumi	3:13
6.	"Weathercock"	Uruu Ru	Ichiro Iguchi	4:21
7.	"Rakuen"	JxSxK	Ichiro Iguchi	4:04
8.	"Tsumemo Kimimo" (ツメも君も)	Yumeka Nowkana?	Kazuki Sato	5:21
9.	"Erase and Rewrite"	Pan Luna Leafy	Satoshi Toyosumi	3:39
10.	"When we wish upon a star"	JxSxK	Ichiro Iguchi	3:50
11.	"Tantakatantantan" (たんたかたんたんたん)	Yumeka Nowkana?	Satoshi Toyosumi	4:05
12.	"Pretender"	Uruu Ru	Ichiro Iguchi	4:39
13.	"Deep thorns"	Jiiku Ryugu	Ichiro Iguchi	4:04
Total length:				53:21

== Charts ==
Chart	Peak position
Japanese Albums (Oricon)	16
Japanese Albums (Billboard)	17
