= Lists of Japanese musical groups =

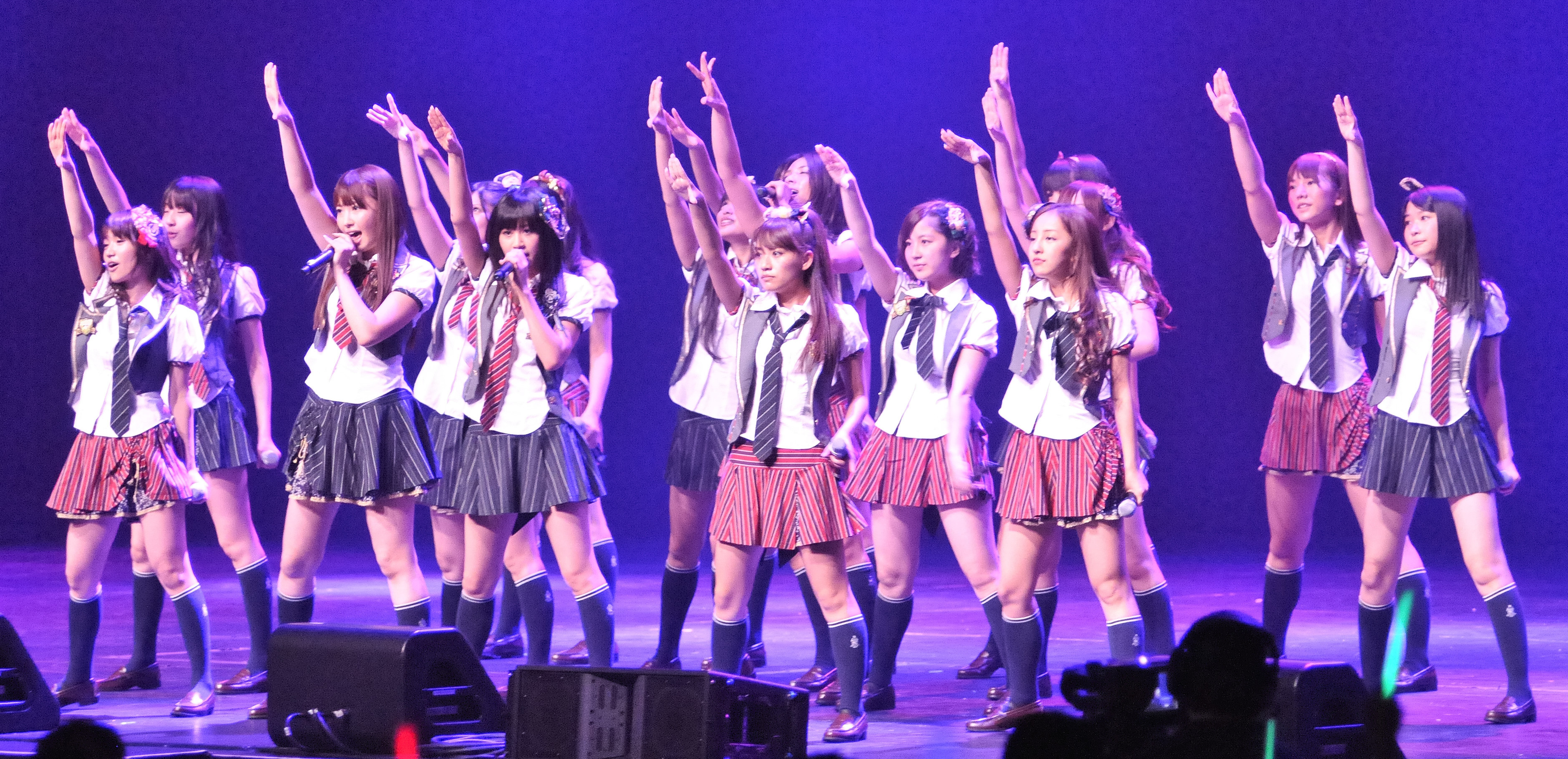
AKB48, a Guinness World Record holder for being the "largest pop group", and the best-selling idol group

Lists of Japanese musical groups, including bands and idol groups, organized by year of debut, include:

- List of Japanese musical groups (2010s)
- List of Japanese musical groups (2020s)
- List of musical artists from Japan
- List of J-pop artists
- List of Japanese rock music groups

== See also ==
- Japanese idol
- J-pop
- Japanese rock
