= HO6LA =

Japanese idol girl group

- Origin: Japan
- Genres: J-pop
- Years active: 2021–2022
- Labels: 15Style Records
- Past members: Pan Luna Leafy; Umi Hachimitsu; Roa Kusunoki; Wannyan Circuit DX!; Emiru; Wazurai
- Website: ho6la.bitfan.id

HO6LA (ホムラ; pronounced Homura), was a Japanese alternative idol girl group that formed in 2021. They released their debut single, "Pirakarira", on October 26, 2021. They disbanded on September 12, 2022.

== History ==
=== 2021: Formation and debut with "Pirakarira" ===
On April 17, 2021, Ichigo Rinahamu announced that she would be holding auditions in order to produce an idol group. Former Bis and Carry Loose member Pan Luna Leafy was revealed as the first member. On August 18, the line-up was finalised with the addition of former Piggs member Umi Hachimitsu, along with Roa Kusunoki, Wannyan Circuit DX!, Emiru and Wazurai. Their debut single, "Pirakarira", was released on October 26, 2021.

=== 2022: Sono Ichi and disbandment ===
The digital single, "Boooost!!", was released on January 10, 2022, followed by "Idol Fire" on April 17. They released their first studio album, Sono Ichi, on June 15. The group disbanded on September 12 due to disagreement on the direction that the group would take.

== Former members ==
- Pan Luna Leafy (パン・ルナリーフィ)
- Umi Hachimitsu (八光うみ)
- Roa Kusunoki (クスノキロア)
- Wannyan Circuit DX! (わんにゃんサーキットDX！)
- Emiru (笑瑠)
- Wazurai (わずらい)

== Discography ==
=== Studio albums ===
Title	Album details	Peak positions	
Title	Album details	JPN Oricon	JPN Billboard
Sono Ichi (其ノ壱)	Released: June 15, 2022; Label: 15Style Records; Formats: CD, digital download	27	42

=== Singles ===
Title	Year	Peak positions	Album
Title	Year	JPN Oricon	Album
"Pirakarira" (ピリカリラ)	2021	12	Sono Ichi
"Boooost!!"	2022	—	Sono Ichi
"Idol Fire"	2022	—	Sono Ichi
"—" denotes releases that did not chart or were not released in that region.
