= Migma Shelter =

Japanese idol girl group

- Origin: Japan
- Genres: J-pop; psytrance
- Years active: 2017–2024
- Labels: AqbiRec
- Past members: Yoneko; Seisei; Amari; Kotejun; Komachi; Popo Popo Po Popo Jr.; Shyshyko; Misonee; Yubune; Nananara; Rere; Mimimiyu; Brazil; Tamane; Wanya+; Yuinon; Nagimuh; Suimi; Merisa
- Website: www.migmashelter.tokyo

Migma Shelter (ミグマシェルター; stylized in all caps), is a Japanese alternative idol girl group that formed in 2017. They released their debut single, "Svaha Eraser", on July 15, 2017. They went on indefinite hiatus after their final concert on June 2, 2024.

== History ==
=== 2016–2018: Formation and debut ===
On August 9, 2016, Koji Tanaka and Hiroaki Taniyama began recruiting members for a new idol girl group. In October, Amari and Kotejun became the first two members of the group.

In January 2017, former Bellring Shōjo Heart member Yoneko (formerly Kanra) joined the line-up. Seisei, Mimimiyu and Komachi also joined the line-up in late January. On March 5, the group's name was finalised as Migma Shelter. They held their first concert on April 16. On July 15, the group debuted with the single "Svaha Eraser". On October 13, the group released the limited single "Amazing Glow". On October 29, Popo Popo Po Popo Jr. was revealed as a new member. On December 27, the group's first EP, Orbit EP, was released.

In January 2018, they held their first tour. On February 10, Yoneko graduated from the group. Seisei graduated from the group on March 31. On May 27, it was announced that the group would go hiatus from July 8 in order to find new members. On July 8, Amari, Kotejun, Komachi and Popo Popo Po Popo Jr. graduated from the group. Before going on hiatus it was announced that a new member named Brazil would join the line-up.

=== 2019–2022: Alice ===
On February 26, 2019, new members Shyshyko, Tamane, Yubune and Misonee joined the group. On March 19, the group released the single "Parade's End". On April 19, former There There Theres member, Arisaka Reina joined the group using the name Rere. On May 21, Misonee went on hiatus. On July 4, Shyshyko withdrew from the group. On July 16, "Names", was released. On September 7, Nananara joined the group. On October 15, "Tokyo Square" was released.

On June 12, 2020, Misonee who had been on hiatus graduated from the group. On August 26, the group's first album, Alice, was released. On December 23, "Paralyzing" was released.

On July 20, 2021, "Coro Da Noite" was released.

On June 7, 2022, Yubune graduated from the group. On August 9, "Redo" was released. On December 13, former HO6LA member Wanya+ and former Dolly Kiss member Yuinon joined the group. Nananara graduated from the group on December 30.

=== 2023–2024: Oz trilogy and indefinite hiatus ===
On April 11, 2023, "Oz One" was released. Rere graduated from the group on April 29. On July 9, Nagimuh, Suimi, and Merisa joined the group. "Oz Two" was released on August 8. Mimimiyu graduated from the group on November 22. "Oz Three" was released on December 6.

On June 2, 2024, Migma Shelter went on indefinite hiatus and all current members graduated from the group.

== Members ==
=== Former ===
- Yoneko (ヨネコ) (formerly Kanra (甘楽))
- Seisei (セイセイ)
- Amari (アマリ)
- Kotejun (コテジュン)
- Komachi (コマチ)
- Popo Popo Po Popo Jr. (ポポポーポ・ポーポポJr.)
- Shyshyko (シャイシャイコ)
- Misonee (ミソニー)
- Yubune (ユブネ)
- Nananara (ナーナナラ)
- Rere (レーレ)
- Mimimiyu (ミミミユ)
- Brazil (ブラジル)
- Tamane (タマネ)
- Wanya+ (ワニャ+)
- Yuinon (ユイノン)
- Nagimuh (ナギムー)
- Suimi (スイミイ)
- Merisa (メリサ)

== Discography ==
=== Studio albums ===
Title	Album details	Peak positions
Title	Album details	JPN Oricon
Alice	Released: August 26, 2020; Label: AqbiRec; Formats: CD, digital download	270

=== Extended plays ===
Title	Album details	Peak positions
Title	Album details	JPN Oricon
Orbit EP	Released: December 27, 2017; Label: AqbiRec; Formats: CD, digital download	219

=== Singles ===
Title	Year	Peak positions	Album
Title	Year	JPN Oricon	Album
"Svaha Eraser"	2017	128	Non-album singles
"Amazing Glow"	2017	—	Non-album singles
"Parade's End"	2019	46	Non-album singles
"Names"	2019	29	Non-album singles
"Tokyo Square"	2019	22	Non-album singles
"Paralyzing"	2020	—	Non-album singles
"Coro Da Noite"	2021	23	Non-album singles
"Redo"	2022	15	Non-album singles
"Oz One"	2023	15	Non-album singles
"Oz Two"	2023	17	Non-album singles
"Oz Three"	2023	26	Non-album singles
"—" denotes a recording that did not chart or was not released in that territory.
