= Himari Tsukishiro =

Japanese idol

- 月城ひまり
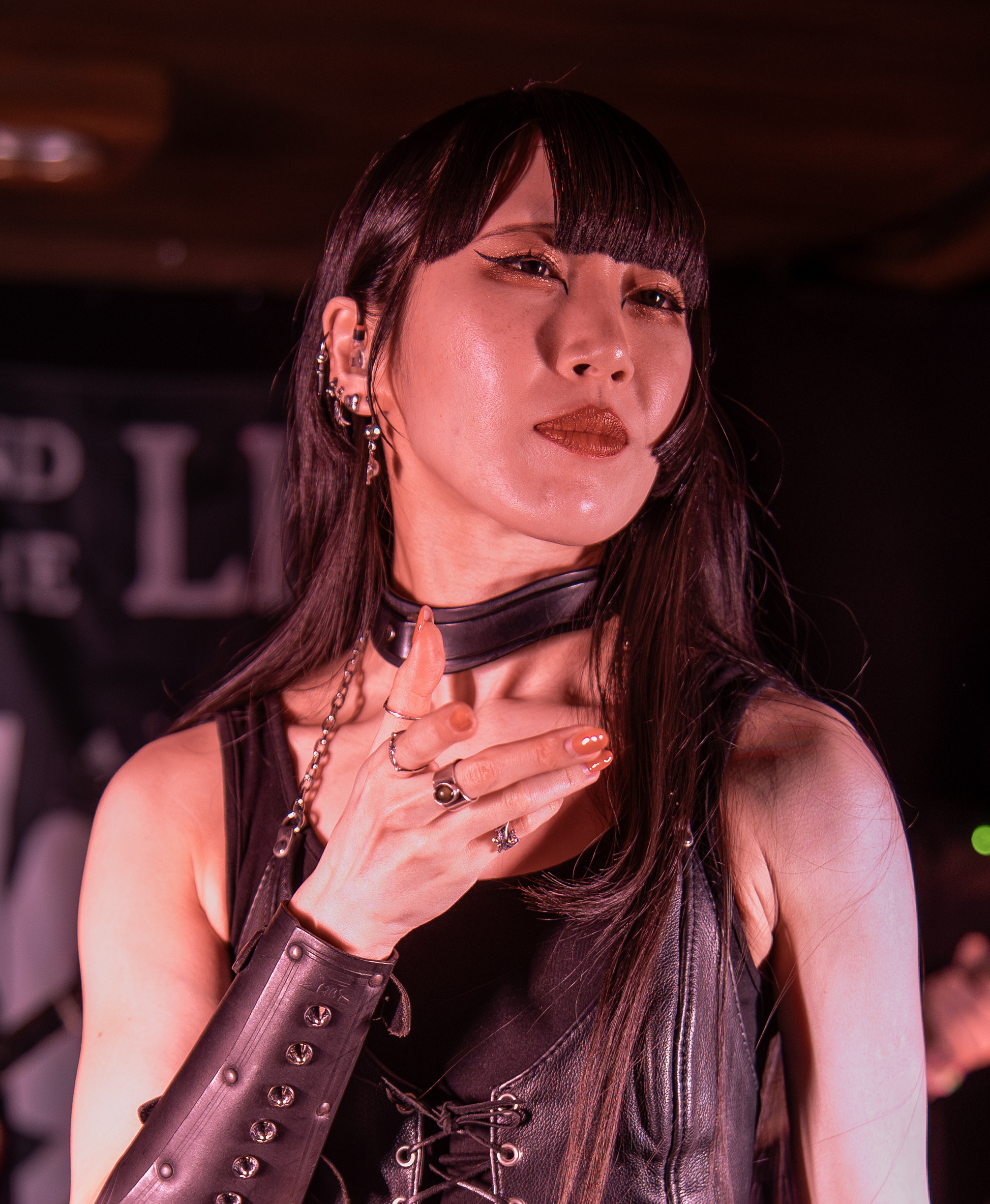
- Tsukishiro in 2025
- Born: March 21
- Other name: Isiliel
- Occupation: Japanese idol
- Years active: 2013–present
- Website: Official website

Himari Tsukishiro (月城ひまり, Tsukishiro Himari; born March 21) is a Japanese idol. She was formerly a member of Bakuon Dolls Syndrome and Necronomidol and is the solo musician behind Isiliel.

== Career ==
At the end of 2013, Tsukishiro debuted with Bakuon Dolls Syndrome.

In January 2017, it was announced that Tsukishiro would join Necronomidol; she officially debuted on January 5 at a live show in Tokyo. By 2021, she began performing solo gigs in addition to her group activities. In 2022, Necronomidol went on hiatus.

In 2022, Tsukishiro formed the solo metal project Isiliel, deriving its name from the Elvish languages in J. R. R. Tolkien's works. She led a debut performance for it on April 16, and a debut single was released on April 21. Focusing on "black metal, atmospheric metal, and doom metal with J-pop melodies," Isiliel released its debut album, Moonbow Genesis, the following year. Since then, Tsukishiro has led Isiliel tours across the world with her backing band, the Lilin.
