= Alternative idol =

Type of Japanese idol that differ from the traditional Japanese idol

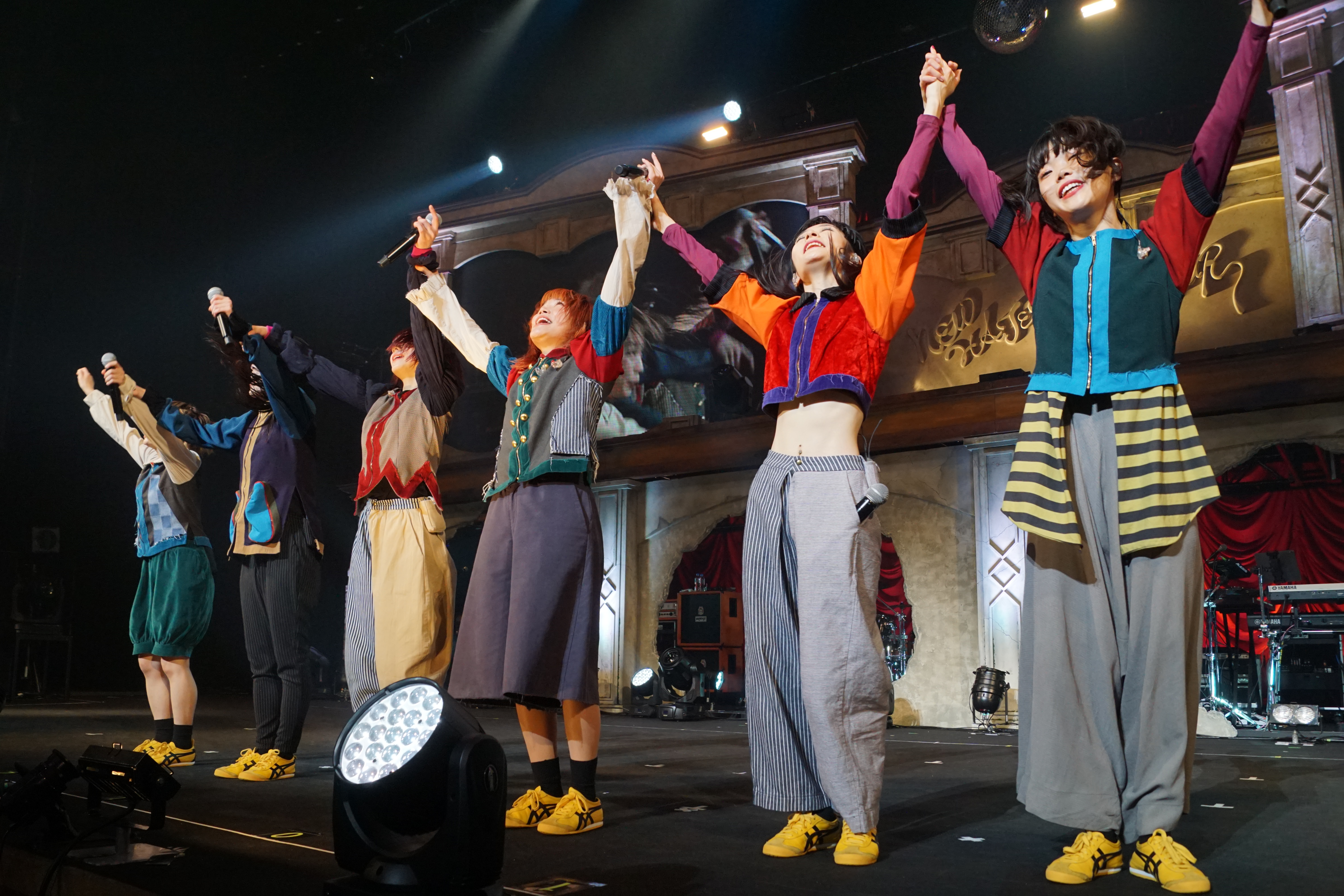
Bish performing in 2019

An alternative idol (also known as an alt-idol or anti-idol) is a term used by overseas J-pop fans to describe idols that differ from the traditional Japanese idol scene typically by having a darker image and performing heavier genres of music. Alternative idols came about in the early 2010s after the formation of Bis popularized mixing alternative rock with typical idol pop music.

== History ==
=== 2010s–2020s: Origin of alternative idols and rising popularity ===
Japanese girl group Bis were the first major alternative idols to debut in Japan. Created by Pour Lui and managed by Junnosuke Watanabe under Tsubasa Records, Bis introduced an image much darker than that of the traditional J-pop idol, initially seen as controversial they soon became known as the pioneers of the alt-idol scene. Seiko Oomori, who debuted in 2012 and has a musical style influenced by idol culture and punk rock, is also considered a pioneer of the scene. Known for utilizing shock value early in her career and touching on hard-hitting subjects in her lyrics Oomori's music has an appeal different from the music of mainstream idols. This style of music led by the likes of Bis and Oomori gave way to the more popular genre of Kawaii metal and began a surge in popularity for the sub-culture of alternative idols.

In 2014, after the disbandment of the first generation of Bis and the formation of Pla2me, former Bis manager Watanabe established WACK, a music production company specialising in alternative idols. To date, they have debuted a second and third generation of Bis, re-debuted Pla2me as Gang Parade, which had previously split into Go to the Beds and Paradises, formed Bish who disbanded at the end of 2023, Empire (now ExWhyZ), Mameshiba no Taigun, ASP, and the now disbanded Carry Loose. WACK's most successful group, Bish, the successor of the first generation of Bis, achieved two number one singles with "Paint It Black" and "Bye-Bye Show", and two number one studio albums with Letters and Going to Destruction.

== Characteristics ==
Generally alternative idols distance themselves from mainstream J-pop by venturing into heavier genres of music and making use of a darker and more unconventional onstage image to garner more attention.

Alternative idols often venture into genres other than pop rock and alternative, such as punk, heavy metal, EDM and new wave.

== Notable artists ==
- ASP
- Billie Idle
- Bis
- Bish
- Carry Loose
- CY8ER
- ExWhyZ
- Gang Parade
- Go to the Beds
- HO6LA
- Inuwasi
- MAD MEDiCiNE
- Maison Book Girl
- Mameshiba no Taigun
- MAZARI
- Migma Shelter
- Necronomidol
- Neo Japonism
- Paradises
- Phantom Siita
- Piggs
- Seiko Oomori
- Sora tob sakana
- Uijin
- You'll Melt More!
- Zenbu Kimi no Sei da.
- ZOC

== See also ==
- Kawaii metal
