= Uijin =

Japanese idol girl group

- Origin: Japan
- Genres: J-pop
- Years active: 2016–2020
- Labels: Sakebi Records; Music@Note
- Past members: Ary; Hitochibi; Yayoi; Rin

Uijin was a Japanese alternative idol girl group that formed in 2016. They debuted on July 5, 2017, with Stay Hungry, Stay Foooolish. The group disbanded on January 5, 2020.

== Members ==
- Ary (ありぃ)
- Hitochibi (ひとちび)
- Yayoi (やよい)
- Rin (りん)

== Discography ==
=== Studio albums ===
Title	Album details	Peak chart positions
Title	Album details	Oricon
Stay Hungry, Stay Foooolish	Released: July 5, 2017; Label: Sakebi Records; Formats: CD, digital download	—
Everything is Practice	Released: April 18, 2018; Label: Sakebi Records; Formats: CD, digital download	55

=== Singles ===
Title	Year	Peak chart positions	Album
Title	Year	Oricon	Album
"Door / Setsunai Uta" (Door/セツナイウタ)	2018	44	Non-album singles
"Transit"	2019	29	Non-album singles
"Ignition / Blooming Days"	2019	21	Non-album singles
"Unlimitter" (アンリミッター)	2019	50	Non-album singles
