= Negicco =

Japanese musical group

- Origin: Niigata, Japan
- Genres: J-pop, indie pop
- Years active: 2003–present
- Label: T-Palette
- Members: Nao; Megu; Kaede
- Past members: Miku; Misaki
- Website: negicco.net

Negicco (ねぎっこ; the name is officially written in Latin script) is a female idol music group created in July 2003. It is composed today of three members: Nao☆, who serves as centre, along with Megu and Kaede. The group is from Niigata, Japan, and was created for the promotion of the local green onion (Allium fistulosum): the word negi (ねぎ) means "green onion" and ko (こ) means child or girl in Japanese. "Negicco" thus means "The green onion girls". The group is produced by Negi-pro Agency, and is signed to the T-Palette Records label. The single "Tokimeki no Headliner" ranked number 20 on the weekly Oricon Singles Chart in November 2013 and Hikari no Spur reached the fifth place.

== Members ==
Current members

- Nao☆ (なお☆)
- Megu (めぐ)
- Kaede (かえで)

Former members

- Miku (みく)
- Misaki (みさき)

== Discography ==
=== Albums ===
Mini-albums

1. ??/??/2009 : Anosorahe (アノソラヘ)
2. 09/07/2010 : Plastic☆Star (プラスちっく☆スター)
3. 20/07/2011 : Get It On!

Compilation

1. 22/02/2012 : Negicco 2003-2012 ~Best~

Studio albums

1. 17/07/2013 : Melody Palette
2. 20/01/2015 : Rice & Snow
3. 24/05/2016 : Tea For Three (ティー・フォー・スリー)
4. 10/07/2018 : My Color
5. 14/08/2024 : What A Wonderful World

=== Singles ===
1. 27/10/2004 : Koi Suru Negikko (恋するねぎっ娘)
2. 25/01/2006 : Falling Stars
3. ??/??/2006 : Bokura wa Tomodachi (僕らはともだち)
4. ??/??/2007 : Earth
5. ??/??/2008 : Summer Breeze
6. ??/??/2008 : Attôteki na Style (圧倒的なスタイル)
7. 10/09/2010 : Negisama! Bravo☆ (ネギさま！ Bravo☆)
8. 02/11/2011 : Koi no Express Train (恋の Express Train)
9. 20/06/2012 : Anata to Pop with You! (あなたとPop With You!)
10. 13/02/2013 : Ai no Tower of Love (愛のタワー・オブ・ラヴ)
11. 29/05/2013 : Idol Bakari Kikanaide (アイドルばかり聴かないで)
12. 06/11/2013 : Tokimeki no Headliner (ときめきのヘッドライナー)
13. 02/12/2014 : Hikari no Spur (光のシュプール)
14. 16/04/2014 : Triple! Wonderland (トリプル!WONDERLAND)
15. 22/07/2014 : Sunshine Nihonkai (サンシャイン日本海)
16. 11/08/2015 : Ne Vardia (ねぇバーディア)
17. 29/03/2016 : Mujyun, Hajimemashita (矛盾、はじめました。)
18. 20/12/2016 : Ai, Kamashitaino (愛、かましたいの)
19. 06/02/2018 : Calypso-musume ni Hanatabao (カリプソ娘に花束を)
20. 24/09/2019 : I LOVE YOUR LOVE
21. 25/08/2020 : Gozen0zi no Sympathy (午前0時のシンパシー)

Featured Single

1. 21/03/2012 : Kanzen Kôryaku (完全攻略) ("Negicco × hy4_4yh")
2. 26/08/2014 : Girl's Life (as Negipecia, a collaboration with Especia)
