= Go to the Beds =

Japanese idol group

- Origin: Tokyo, Japan
- Genres: J-pop
- Years active: 2020–2022
- Labels: WACK; Fueled By Mentaiko
- Spinoff of: Gang Parade
- Past members: Miki Yamamachi; Yua Yumeno; Can GP Maika; Yui Ga Dockson; Coco Partin Coco; Changbaby
- Website: gotothebeds.com

Go to the Beds, stylized as GO TO THE BEDS was a Japanese alternative idol girl group formed in 2020 after the split of Gang Parade. The group ceased activities as Go to the Beds and resumed activities as Gang Parade at the beginning of 2022.

== History ==
=== 2020: Formation and Go to the Beds ===
Following the announcement of Saki Kamiya's graduation from Gang Parade, it was announced that Gang Parade would split into two groups: Go to the Beds, consisting of Miki Yamamachi, Yua Yumeno, Can GP Maika, Yui Ga Dockson and Coco Partin Coco, and Paradises, consisting of Yuka Terashima, Usagi Tsukino, Naruhaworld. They released the split EP, G/P, consisting of three songs per group and Saki Kamiya's final solo song on April 1, 2020. They released their eponymous debut album on July 22.

=== 2021–2022: Reincarnation, Blood Compact, line-up swap and return to Gang Parade ===
They released their first solo EP, Reincarnation, on January 13, 2021. On March 27, it was announced that a new member, Changbaby, would join the group. She made her first appearance as a member on May 2. They released their second EP, Blood Compact, on July 21. On October 2, it was announced that all members of Go to the Beds and Paradises would immediately swap groups. They released a second split EP, G⇔P, on December 15. On January 2, 2022, Go to the Beds ceased activities and returned to Gang Parade.

== Members ==
=== Initial line-up ===
- Miki Yamamachi (ヤママチミキ)
- Yua Yumeno (ユメノユア)
- Can GP Maika (キャン・GP・マイカ)
- Yui Ga Dockson (ユイ・ガ・ドクソン)
- Coco Partin Coco (ココ・パーティン・ココ)
- Changbaby (チャンベイビー)

=== Swap line-up ===
- Yuka Terashima (テラシマユウカ)
- Usagi Tsukino (月ノウサギ)
- Naruhaworld (ナルハワールド)
- Kila May (キラ・メイ)
- Ca Non (キャ・ノン)

== Discography ==
=== Studio albums ===
Title	Album details	Peak positions	
Title	Album details	JPN Oricon	JPN Billboard
Go to the Beds	Released: July 22, 2020; Label: Fueled by Mentaiko; Formats: CD, digital download	11	16

=== Extended plays ===
Title	EP details	Peak positions	
Title	EP details	JPN Oricon	JPN Billboard
G/P with Paradises	Released: April 1, 2020; Label: Fueled by Mentaiko; Formats: CD, digital download	18	19
Reincarnation	Released: January 13, 2021; Label: Fueled by Mentaiko; Formats: CD, digital download	5	8
Blood Compact	Released: July 21, 2021; Label: Fueled by Mentaiko; Formats: CD, digital download	5	10
G⇔P with Paradises	Released: December 15, 2021; Label: Fueled by Mentaiko; Formats: CD, digital download	3	5

=== Singles ===
==== Collaborations ====
Title	Year	Peak chart positions	Album
Title	Year	Oricon	Album
"True Song" with Yuki Kashiwagi	2021	10	Non-album single
