= Ultra Girl (band) =

Japanese female idol group

- Origin: Tokyo, Japan
- Genres: J-pop
- Years active: May 5, 2012 – present
- Labels: Spiral Music (2012 – 2015); Versionmusic (2015–present)
- Members: Tomoyo Asō; Serina Kawasaki; Noa Suzuki; Fumika Arai; Miyū Hirose
- Website: www.diamondblog.jp/ultragirl//

Ultra Girl (ウルトラガール) is a Japanese 5-member female idol group, formed in May 2012. It is affiliated to the entertainment company Spiral Music.

== Members ==
Name	Birth date and age	Nickname	Prefecture of origin	Color	Notes
Tomoyo Asō (麻生智世)	November 10, 1996 (age 29)	Tomoron	Kanagawa	White	Leader
Serina Kawasaki (川崎芹奈)	November 24, 1996 (age 29)	Serinyan	Tokyo	Blue	
Noa Suzuki (鈴木希空)	August 9, 1997 (age 29)	Noachan	Tokyo	Red	
Fumika Arai (新井郁花)	November 18, 1997 (age 28)	Fumichan	Saitama	Pink	
Miyū Hirose (広瀬光悠)	February 8, 2000 (age 26)	Miichan	Tokyo	Yellow	

== Discography ==
=== Singles ===
No.	Title	Release date	Charts
No.	Title	Release date	JPN
Spiral Music
1	"Seigi no Mikata" (正義の味方)	July 14, 2012	—
2	"Tenkyu!" (てんきゅ！)	October 18, 2012	—
3	"Ultra Ōenka" (ウルトラ応援歌)	October 2, 2013	36
4	"Kirakirapikapikarinrinrin" (キラキラピカピカリンリンリン)	December 20, 2013	
5	"888"	March 12, 2014	38
6	"Kimi! Hīrō ni Natte" (君！ヒーローになって)	September 23, 2014	35
Versionmusic
7	"No.1 / Mugamuchu"NO.1/無我夢中	March 18, 2015	21

=== DVDs / Blu-ray Discs ===
No.	Release details
1	Spiral Music Video Collection Vol. 1 (SPIRAL MUSIC VIDEO COLLECTION VOL.1): Released: December 28, 2012; Label: Spiral Music
2	Suiseki!! Honto ni Atta Kyōfu no Tōkō Eizō Vol. 1 (追跡!!ほんとにあった恐怖の投稿映像 vol.1): Released: February 6, 2013; Label: Spiral Music; Format(s): DVD
3	Spiral Music Video Collection Vol. 2 (SPIRAL MUSIC LIVE & MUSIC VIDEO COLLECTION Vol.2): Released: December 2, 2013; Label: Spiral Music

=== Music videos ===
Year	Title
2012	"Tenkyu!"
2014	"Ultra Ōenka"
2014	"888"
2014	"Kimi! Hero ni Natte"
2015	"No. 1"
