= Paradises (group) =

Japanese idol group

- Origin: Tokyo, Japan
- Genres: J-pop
- Years active: 2020–2022
- Labels: WACK; Fueled By Mentaiko
- Spinoff of: Gang Parade
- Members: Yuka Terashima; Usagi Tsukino; Naruhaworld; Kila May; Ca Non
- Past members: Utauuta
- Website: paradises.jp

Paradises (stylized in all caps) was a Japanese alternative idol girl group formed in 2020 after the split of Gang Parade. The group ceased activities as Paradises and resumed activities as Gang Parade at the beginning of 2022.

== History ==
=== 2020: Formation and Paradises ===
Following the announcement of Saki Kamiya's graduation from Gang Parade, it was announced that Gang Parade would split into two groups: Go to the Beds, consisting of Miki Yamamachi, Yua Yumeno, Can GP Maika, Yui Ga Dockson and Coco Partin Coco, and Paradises, consisting of Yuka Terashima, Usagi Tsukino, Naruhaworld. They released the split EP, G/P, consisting of three songs per group and Saki Kamiya's final solo song on April 1, 2020. Kila May joined the group on May 22. They released their eponymous debut album on July 22. On December 26, Utauuta joined the group and Usagi Tsukino went on a six-month hiatus.

=== 2021–2022: Compilation albums, Paradises Return, line-up swap and return to Gang Parade ===
On January 30, 2021, the group released the compilation album, Paradises (Refresh Ver.), which featured all of their previous songs with the addition of new member Utauuta and the exception of Usagi Tsukino who was on hiatus at the time. They released their first solo EP, Paradises Return, on March 3. On March 27, it was announced that a new member, Ca Non, would join the group. She made her first appearance as a member on April 28. On July 1, Usagi Tsukino returned from her six-month hiatus and a second compilation album, Paradises (Free Ver.), was released which featured all of the group's previous songs with all current Paradises members present. On July 9, Utauuta left the group due to difference in opinion of the direction the group was going in. They released their first single, "Daiji na Uta" (大事な歌), on July 28. On October 2, it was announced that all members of Paradises and Go to the Beds would immediately swap groups. They released a second split EP, G⇔P, on December 15. On January 2, 2022, Paradises ceased activities and returned to Gang Parade.

== Members ==
=== Initial line-up ===
- Yuka Terashima (テラシマユウカ)
- Usagi Tsukino (月ノウサギ)
- Naruhaworld (ナルハワールド)
- Kila May (キラ・メイ)
- Ca Non (キャ・ノン)

=== Former ===
- Utauuta (ウタウウタ)

=== Swap line-up ===
- Miki Yamamachi (ヤママチミキ)
- Yua Yumeno (ユメノユア)
- Can GP Maika (キャン・GP・マイカ)
- Yui Ga Dockson (ユイ・ガ・ドクソン)
- Coco Partin Coco (ココ・パーティン・ココ)
- Changbaby (チャンベイビー)

== Discography ==
=== Studio albums ===
Title	Album details	Peak chart positions	
Title	Album details	JPN Oricon	JPN Billboard
Paradises	Released: July 22, 2020; Label: Fueled By Mentaiko; Formats: CD, digital download	15	24

=== Compilation albums ===
Title	Album details
Paradises (Refresh Ver.)	Released: January 30, 2021; Label: Fueled By Mentaiko; Formats: CD, digital download
Paradises (Free Ver.)	Released: July 1, 2021; Label: Fueled By Mentaiko; Formats: CD, digital download

=== Extended plays ===
Title	Album details	Peak positions	
Title	Album details	JPN Oricon	JPN Billboard
G/P with Go to the Beds	Released: April 1, 2020; Label: Fueled by Mentaiko; Formats: CD, digital download	18	19
Paradises Return	Released: March 3, 2021; Label: Fueled by Mentaiko; Formats: CD, digital download	17	23
G⇔P with Go to the Beds	Released: December 15, 2021; Label: Fueled By Mentaiko; Formats: CD, digital download	3	5

=== Singles ===
Title	Year	Peak positions	Album
Title	Year	JPN Oricon	Album
"Daiji na Uta" (大事な歌)	2021	7	Paradises (Free Ver.)
"Natsu no Bakayarō" (夏のバカヤロー) with Yuki Kashiwagi	2021	15	Non-album single
