= Zenbu Kimi no Sei da. =

Japanese idol girl group

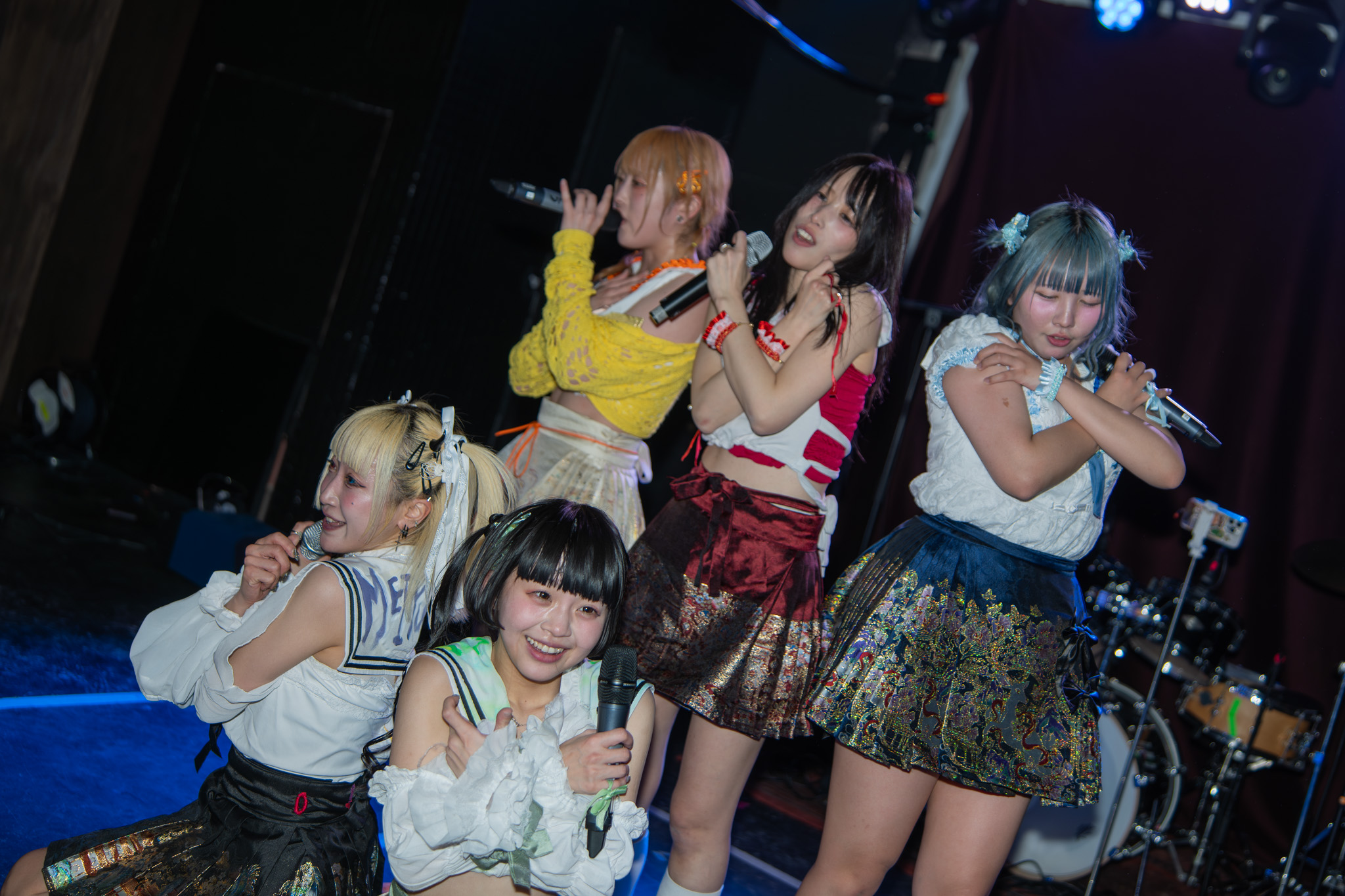
- Left to right: Hino Hikari, Megumi Kisaragi, Muku, Mei Yui Mei and Komochi Nene in 2025

Background information
- Origin: Japan
- Genres: J-pop
- Years active: 2015–present
- Members: Megumi Kisaragi; Mei Yui Mei; Muku; Hino Hikari
- Past members: Asuna Yumesaki; Aza Mogeki; Gomochi Narumi; Mene Mikuchiyo; Togaren; Akebono Nagi; Yotsu Hitomi; Mashiro; Oyatsu Yukinojou; An Amanechi; Fufu Shizuku; Kasane Motochika; Kotetsu; Miruru Rate; Komochi Nene
- Website: kiminosei.com

Zenbu Kimi no Sei da. (ぜんぶ君のせいだ。; It's All Your Fault.) is a Japanese alternative idol girl group formed in 2015. They released their debut album, "Yamikawa IMRAD", on January 27, 2016.

== Members ==
Name	Member Color	Notes	Details
Current Members			
Megumi Kisaragi (如月愛海)	Red	Original Member	
Muku ( むく)	”Foam” (baby blue)	Joined March 2024	
Mei Yui Mei (メイユイメイ)	"Angel" (White)	Joined January 2021	
Hino Hikari	“Sunset” (Orange)	Joined March 2024	
Former Members			
Asuna Yumesaki (夢咲夢日)	Yellow	Original Member, Left October 2015	
Aza Mogeki (十字)	Purple	Original Member, Left November 2016	
Gomochi Narumi (成海5才)	Light Blue	Original Member, Left December 2016	
Mene Mikuchiyo (未来千代めね)	Dark Blue	Joined January 2017, Left August 2017	Left for health reasons
Togaren (咎憐无)	Pink	Joined January 2017, Left April 2019	left to retire from the entertainment industry; returned to the industry December 2019 as "Coai" with the group "PEDIOPHOBIA" (2019-2020), later joined "Yakousei Amuse" in March 2021, and "GILTY × GILTY" in June 2023 as "Hakuu Coai".
Yotsu Hitomi (一十三四)	Green	Joined August 2015, Left August 2020	
Akebono Nagi (凪あけぼの)	Yellow	Joined May 2019, Left August 2020	
Mashiro (ましろ)	White	Original Member, Left September 2020	Later joined "YOLOZ" under the name "Ichi"
Oyatsu Yukinojou (征之丞十五時)	Sky Blue	Joined May 2019, Left April 2022	
An Amanechi (甘福氐喑)	Green	Joined September 2020, Left April 2022	
Fufu Shizuku (雫ふふ)	Gray	Joined September 2020, Fired November 2022	Left after multiple contract violations
Kasane Motochika (もとちか襲）	Purple	Joined September 2020, Left March 2023	Left during her hiatus
Kotetsu (个喆）	“First Love” (Pink)	Joined January 2021, Left March 2023	
Miruru Latte (己涙々らて)	“Drowning Pink” (pink)	Joined March 2024, Left April 2024	Left due to mental health issues
Komochi Nene (寝こもち)	"Ramune" (Green)	Joined April 2022, hiatus since March 2026, withdrew June 2026	Former Seireki13ya member. Final appearance July 18, 2026

== Discography ==
=== Studio albums ===
Title	Album details	Peak chart positions	
Title	Album details	JPN	
Title	Album details	Oricon	Hot
Yamikawa IMRAD (やみかわIMRAD)	Released: January 27, 2016; Label: Codomomental; Formats: CD, digital download	120	—
Anima Animusu PRDX (アニマあにむすPRDX)	Released: November 9, 2016; Label: Codomomental; Formats: CD, digital download	53	100
Egoistic Eat Issues	Released: September 6, 2017; Label: Codomomental; Formats: CD, digital download	36	54
Neorder Nation	Released: July 4, 2018; Label: Codomomental; Formats: CD, digital download	31	62
Arumumei (或夢命)	Released: December 18, 2019; Label: Codomomental; Formats: CD, digital download	70	85
FlashBack NightMare	Released: November 24, 2021; Label: Codomomental; Formats: CD, digital download	188	—

=== Re-recorded albums ===
Title	Album details	Peak chart positions	
Title	Album details	JPN	
Title	Album details	Oricon	Hot
Live or Die ~Chinu Ichi~ (LIVE or DIE〜ちぬいち〜)	Released: July 31, 2019; Label: Codomomental; Formats: CD, digital download	34	96
Live or Die ~Chinu Ni~ (LIVE or DIE〜ちぬに〜)	Released: October 16, 2019; Label: Codomomental; Formats: CD, digital download	80	—
Q.E.D.mono	Released: March 31, 2021; Label: Codomomental; Formats: CD, digital download	38	87
Q.E.D.bi	Released: June 2, 2021; Label: Codomomental; Formats: CD, digital download	64	90
Q.E.D.tri	Released: April 27, 2022; Label: Codomomental; Formats: CD, digital download	TBA	TBA

=== Compilation albums ===
Title	Album details	Peak chart positions	
Title	Album details	JPN	
Title	Album details	Oricon	Hot
Ninon (新音)	Released: September 6, 2017; Label: Codomomental; Formats: CD, digital download	53	—

=== Singles ===
Title	Year	Peak chart positions	Album
Title	Year	Oricon	Album
"Mudai Gasshō" (無題合唱)	2016	52	Anima Animusu PRDX
"Boku Tabetamo Kimi no Subete wo" (僕喰賜君ノ全ヲ)	2016	31	Anima Animusu PRDX
"Sophomore Sick Sacrifice"	2017	40	Egoistic Eat Issues
"Wagamama Shinsei Hominina" (わがまま新生Hominina)	2017	36	Egoistic Eat Issues
"Sekirarararai Otto" (せきららららいおっと)	2017	58	Neorder Nation
"Tonari Kore Arata" (トナリコレアラタ)	2018	21	Neorder Nation
"Natural Born Independent / Romance Sect" (Natural Born Independent/ロマンスセクト)	2019	29	Arumumei
"Antilyours"	2019	35	Arumumei
"Zenbu Boku no Sei da" (ぜんぶ僕のせいだ。)	2019	61	Arumumei
"Insomnia" (インソムニア)	2020	—	FlashBack NightMare
"Dada" (堕堕)	2021	48	FlashBack NightMare
"Heavenlyheaven"	2021	61	FlashBack NightMare
"Roman Jihen" (浪漫事変)	2022	41	
"Lotus Flower Cosmetics"	2024	—	
