= LinQ =

Japanese girl group

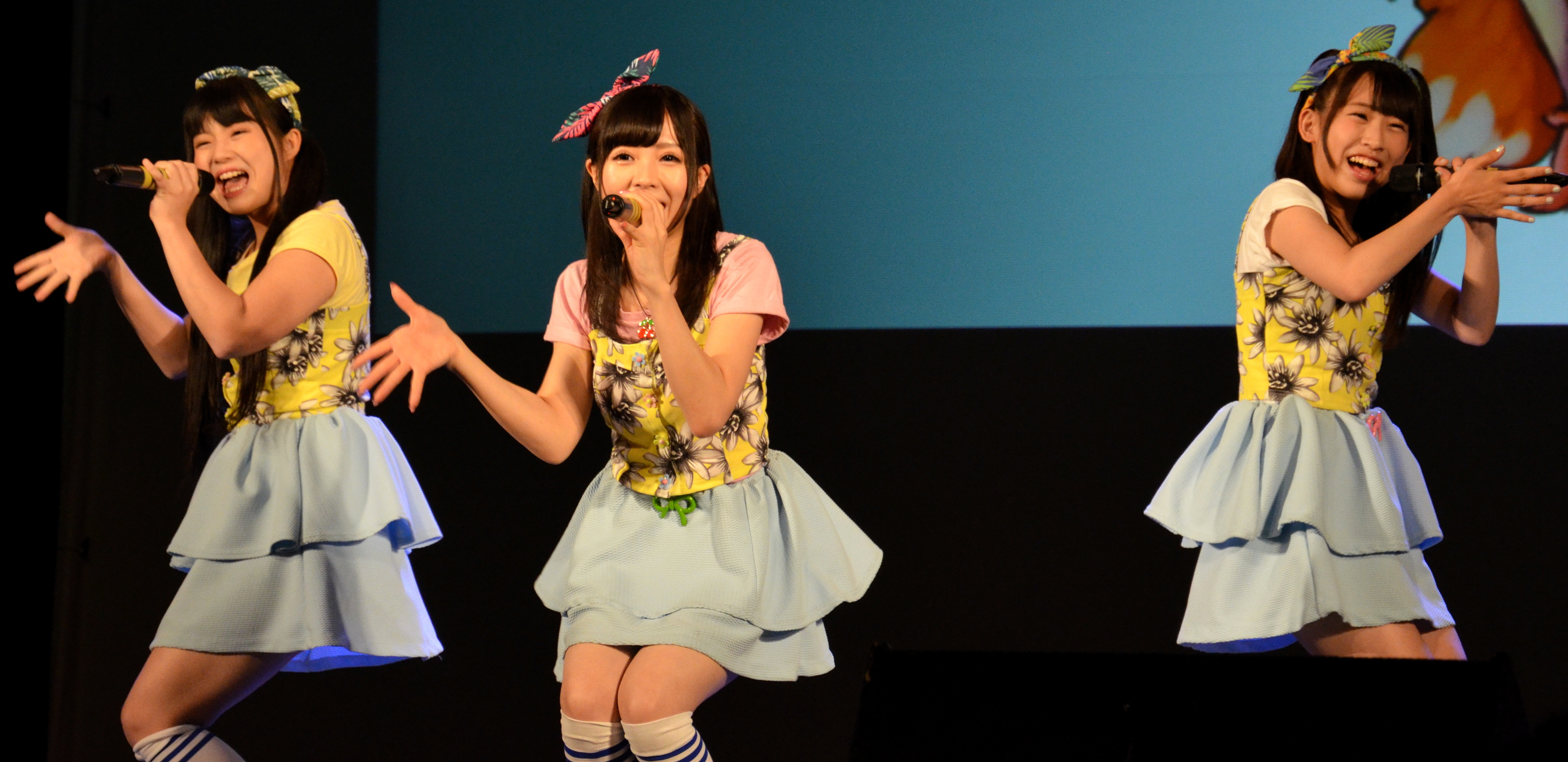

Background information
- Origin: Fukuoka, Fukuoka, Japan
- Genres: J-pop
- Years active: 2011–present
- Labels: T-Palette Records (2011–2013); Warner Music Japan (2013–2016); FRAME (LEVEL-5/avex) (2016–2018); Daiki Sound Co., Ltd. (2019-present)
- Members: Rana Kaizuki: Rei Kuroda; Minami Arimura; Sawa Morito; Akari Hanayama; Meku Tachibana; Rizu Orita; Yuu Moriyama
- Website: www.loveinq.com

LinQ (pronounced "link") is a Japanese girl group. Their name stands for "Love in Qshu", in reference to their hometown of Fukuoka, on the island of Kyushu.

== Members ==
The members were formerly divided into two groups, Qty and Lady.

=== Current ===
- Rana Kaizuki
- Rei Kuroda – leader
- Minami Arimura
- Sawa Morito
- Akari Hanayama
- Meku Tachibana
- Rizu Orita

=== Notable Former ===
- Maki Itoh
- Manami Sakura
- Ayano Yamaki
- Kana Fukuyama
- MYU
- Chisa Ando
- Asaka Sakai
- Maina Kohinata
- Chiaki Yoshikawa
- Sakura Araki
- Riona Yoda
- Miyu Kaneko
- Yuumi Takaki

=== Subunits ===
LinQ Qty (LinQ Cutie) is a derived unit consisting of LinQ's teenage members. It was formed in April 2023.

Name	Timeline
Rei Kuroda	April 2023 – present
Minami Arimura	April 2023 – present
Sawa Morito	April 2023 – present
Akari Hanayama	April 2023 – present
Riko Ozora	April 2023 – February 2024

SRAM performs rock style songs. It was formed in November 2013.

Name	Stage Name	Timeline
MYU		2013 – Mid 2017
Chiaki Yoshikawa	SARA	2013 – Mid 2017
Mayu Kishida	LADY-K	2013 – Mid 2017
Aya Maikawa	AYA	2013 – Early 2017
Narumi Yuji	ROU	2013 – 2015

== Discography ==
=== Singles ===
#	Release date	Title	Highest Chart Position (Oricon)
LinQ Records (indie label)
1st	9-28-2011	Hajimemashite / for you / Nau	—
T-Palette Records (indie label)
2nd	11-9-2011	Calorie Nante / Kimochi / Te wo tsunaide	22
3rd	2-29-2012	Sakura Kajitsu/ Sakura Monogatari	15
4th	7-18-2012	Shiawase no Energy/ Matsuri no Yoru 〜 Kimi o Suki ni Natta hi 〜	6
5th	1-30-2013	CHIKU-TAKU/ Going My Way!	5
Warner Music Japan (major label)
6th	4-17-2013	Chime ga Owareba	3
7th	8-7-2013	HANABI!!	12
8th	1-22-2014	Colorful Days	2
9th	7-30-2014	Natsu Koi	8
10th	9-24-2014	Uessai! Gassai!	6
11th	4-29-2015	Hare Hare Parade	8
12th	9-21-2015	LinQuest 〜 Yagate Densetsu he...	8
LinQ Records (indie label)
13th	3-28-2016	Supreme	6
FRAME (major label)
14th	9-21-2016	Furusato Japon	13
15th	2-22-2017	Makenaizo	8
16th	5-3-2017	Treasure	69
17th	1-31-2018	Aa Jounetsu no Banbarayaa / Shitsuren Photograph	—
LinQ Records (indie label)
18th	1-30-2019	Susume! Shounen Shoujo	32

=== Digital Singles ===
#	Release date	Title	Highest Chart Position (Oricon)
LinQ Records (indie label)
1st	9-1-2019	Wavy Hug	—
2nd	9-25-2020	Q&A	—
3rd	10-2-2020	RI・RI・RI	—
4th	11-13-2020	Hitorijime	—
5th	12-11-2020	Jōnetsu Salamander	—
6th	1-1-2021	Matsuri kō ondo	—
7th	1-15-2021	Aiaiaishito-to	—
8th	12-24-2022	Winter Magic	—
IQP Records (indie label)
9th	6-3-2024	Sun Sun Rise!	—
9th	6-3-2024	Kutsu himo	—
10th	7-20-2024	Mainichi dokokade Festival	—
11th	11-20-2024	Muka ko ̄-san demo suki tte itte!	—
12th	12-18-2024	Oshirase shimasu, kimi o suki ni narimashita	—

=== Music Cards ===
#	Release date	Title	Highest Chart Position (Oricon)
LinQ Records (indie label)
1st	5-3-2019	LOVEBOMB	—
IQP Records (indie label)
2nd	8-25-2021	Fukuoka . ~Fukuoka Suru Noda~	—
3rd	2-9-2022	Go! Go! YELL～Kimi is Beautiful～	—
4th	4-16-2023	FANTASTIC WORLD	—
5th	4-10-2024	Obentou	—

=== Mini-albums ===
#	Release date	Title	Chart position (Oricon)
IQP Records (indie label)
1st	11-13-2019	anytime	13

=== Albums ===
#	Release date	Title	Chart position (Oricon)
T-Palette Records (indie label)
1st	4-25-2012	Love in Qushu 〜LinQ Daiichi Gakushō〜	37
Warner Music Japan (major label)
2nd	3-26-2014	AWAKE 〜LinQ Daini Gakushō〜	64
3rd	11-25-2015	FRONTIER 〜LinQ Daisan Gakushō〜	57
4th	4-17-2025	TO YOU ~LinQ Daigo Gakushō~ (YOU~END~ME Version/ I~LIKE~YOU Version)	—

=== Compilation albums ===
#	Release date	Title	Chart position (Oricon)
LinQ Records (indie label)
1st	1-30-2019	Love in Qyushu vol.1	38
2nd	1-30-2019	Love in Qyushu vol.2	46
3rd	1-30-2019	Bari uma! LinQooking	40

=== Other album appearances ===
Release date	Title	Label
7-18-2012	LOCAL IDOL BEST! (Hajimemashite)	Toy's Factory
3-12-2014	Mirrorball Flare + Royal Mirrorball Discothèque (BlueFilm(Himesaki Ami))	FRAME
22-2-2017	BRING IT ON (Fukuoka Stand Up(FREAK feat. Natural Radio Station & LinQ))	avex trax

=== Video works ===
Release date	Title	Chart position (Oricon)
LinQ Records (indie label)
4-10-2013	LinQ 1st Anniversary Live@Zepp Fukuoka 2012.4.17 ＜Tonkotsu Kakumei! Ko Sugitara Gomen Tai!＞	(DVD)
Warner Music Japan (major label)
4-10-2013	LinQ ZERO 〜LinQ・LinK Vol.0〜	201 (DVD)
5-8-2013	LinQ Shinshun Tokubetsu Kooen 〜Gakui Ka〜（Tanoshimou de） Akemashite Omedetou Gozaimashite	77 (2DVDs) / - (Blu-ray)
9-9-2015	LinQ 4th Anniversary 〜 Welcome to the LinQworld!! 〜	150 (2DVDs) / 61 (Blu-ray)
Pigoo / Job Net
8-31-2023 - 12-27-2023	Shin IQ to LinQ suru.	(5Blu-rays)
