= Neo Japonism =

Japanese idol group

- Origin: Tokyo, Japan
- Genres: J-pop
- Years active: 2017–present
- Label: Neo Japonism Inc.
- Members: Hinano Takizawa; Sayaka Tatsumi; Miruka Seto; Ai Asakura; Miyu Fukuda; Nao Izumi; Chiyori Owada
- Past members: Moka Aizawa; Momoka Dodo; Mirei Morita; Rana Fujii; Yuu Mamiya
- Website: neojaponism.com

Neo Japonism (ネオジャポニズム, stylized in all caps) is a Japanese alternative idol girl group formed in 2017. They made their debut with Neo Glamorous in June 2018. The group suspended activities in May 2019, after three members were fired due to contract violations and the other as they terminated their contracts. A new line-up began activities in November 2019 and remained active until the end of January 2025. They resumed activities in April 2025.

== History ==
Neo Japonism was formed in 2017. They released their debut album, Neo Glamorous, on June 30, 2018. Their first single, "Carry On" was released on September 11.

On May 22, 2019, it was announced that three days prior, on May 19, Moka Aizawa, Momoka Dodo and Mirei Morita had been fired from the group due to a breach of contract. The remaining two members, Rana Fujii and Yuu Mamiya, also withdrew from the group as they no longer wished to be members, thus Neo Japonism suspended activities. On October 25, it was announced that Neo Japonism would be resuming activities with a new line-up. The new five member line-up was revealed on December 14.

On December 15, 2024, it was announced that Neo Japonism's current line-up would end activities on January 31, 2025, and that the group would go on a temporary hiatus to re-organise and add new members. In March 2025, Nao Izumi and Chiyori Owada joined the line-up and the group resumed activities on April 22. Miyu Fukuda will graduate from the group in December.

== Members ==
Current

- Hinano Takizawa (滝沢ひなの)
- Sayaka Tatsumi (辰巳さやか)
- Miruka Seto (瀬戸みるか)
- Ai Asakura (朝倉あい)
- Miyu Fukuda (福田みゆ)
- Nao Izumi (泉なお)
- Chiyori Owada (大和田ちより)

Former

- Moka Aizawa (相澤萌楓)
- Momoka Dodo (百百百華)
- Mirei Morita (森田美玲)
- Rana Fujii (藤井ラナ)
- Yuu Mamiya (間宮遊)

== Discography ==
=== Studio albums ===
Title	Album details
Neo Glamorous	Released: June 30, 2018; Label: Leadi Inc.; Formats: CD, digital download
Here Now	Released: July 9, 2020; Label: Leadi Inc.; Formats: CD, digital download
Over Time	Released: July 16, 2020; Label: Leadi Inc.; Formats: CD, digital download
The Spirit	Released: January 27, 2021; Label: Leadi Inc.; Formats: CD, digital download
Egoist	Released: October 31, 2024; Label: Neo Japonism; Formats: CD, digital download

=== Compilation albums ===
Title	Album details
Neo	Released: August 16, 2022; Label: Neo Japonism; Formats: CD, digital download
Japonism	Released: September 4, 2022; Label: Neo Japonism; Formats: CD, digital download
Neo Japonism	Released: September 14, 2022; Label: Neo Japonism; Formats: Digital download

=== Extended plays ===
Title	Album details	Peak chart positions
Title	Album details	Oricon
Non Call-Now	Released: April 10, 2020; Label: Leadi Inc.; Formats: Digital download	—
Non Label	Released: August 22, 2025; Label: Neo Japonism; Formats: Digital download	26

=== Singles ===
Title	Year	Peak chart positions	Album
Title	Year	Oricon	Album
"Carry On"	2018	31	Here Now
"Subliminal"	2020	—	The Spirit
"Spica"	2020	—	The Spirit
"Legend of Batachiki – Batachiki Densetsu" (Legend of Batachiki 〜バタチキ伝説〜)	2020	—	The Spirit
"Mind-Mirror Nuxx"	2020	—	The Spirit
"Trigger"	2021	—	The Spirit
"Set off"	2021	—	Neo Japonism
"Trauma"	2021	—	Non-album single
"Signal"	2021	—	Neo Japonism
"Gan Gan Hero!"	2021	—	Neo Japonism
"Buster Buster"	2021	—	Neo Japonism
"Tomoshibi"	2021	—	Non-album single
"Black and White"	2021	—	Egoist
"Susume" (すすめ)	2022	—	Neo Japonism
"Howl out"	2022	—	Egoist
"Black Jam"	2023	—	Egoist
"Babylon"	2023	—	Egoist
"Sniper"	2023	20	Non-album singles
"Wabisabi Wasabi"	2023	49	Non-album singles
"Dear"	2023	31	Non-album singles
"Kotobuki"	2024	30	Non-album singles
"Never Fade Away"	2025	—	Non Label
"—" denotes releases that did not chart or were not released in that region.
