= Necronomidol =

Japanese idol heavy metal group

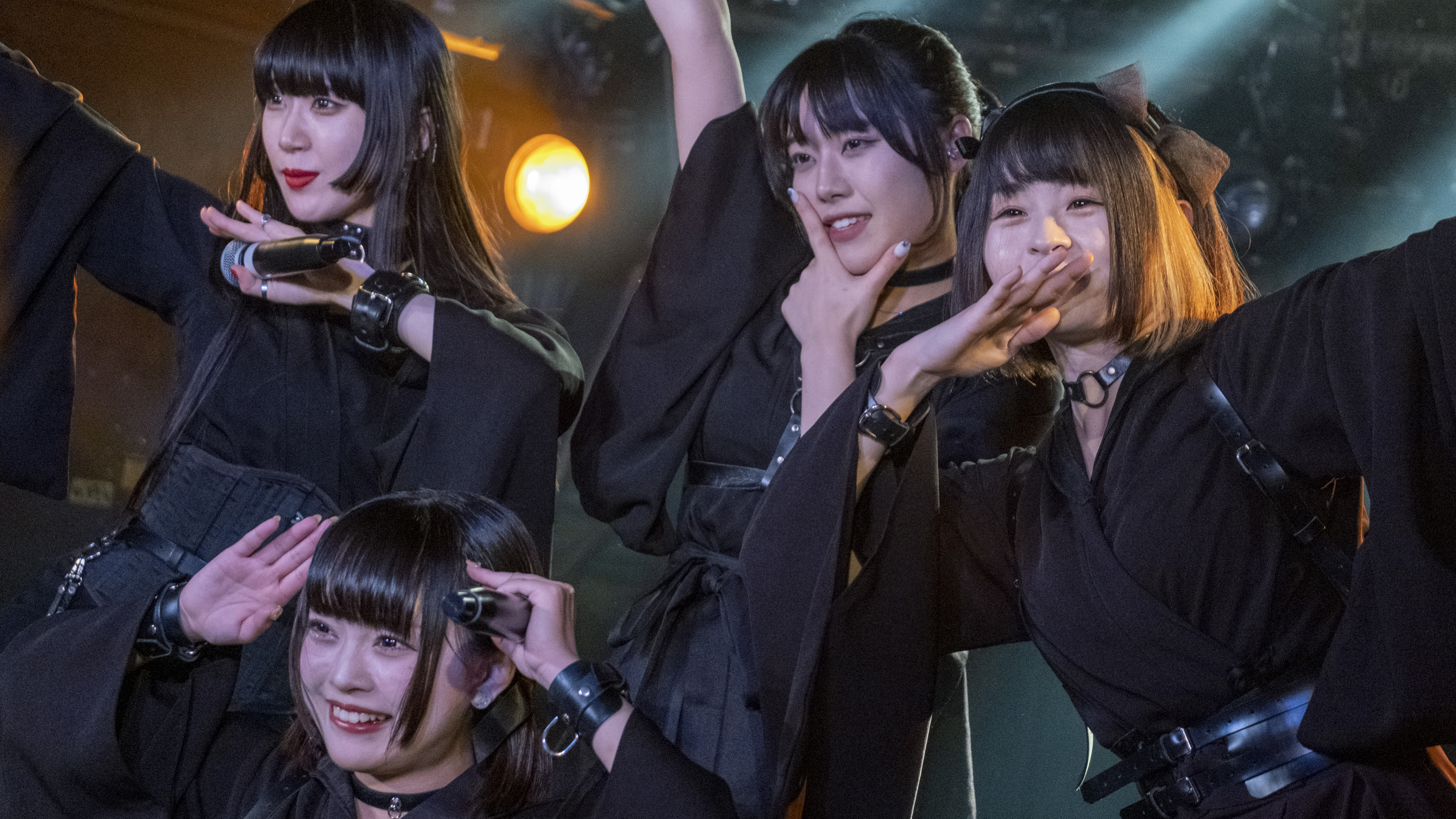
- Necronomidol live at Shimokitazawa Shelter, June 2022

Background information
- Origin: Japan
- Genres: Kawaii metal; post-black metal
- Years active: 2014–present (hiatus since 2022)
- Past members: See list of members
- Website: necronomidol.com necronomidol.bandcamp.com

Necronomidol is a Japanese idol heavy metal group, formed in 2014. They have been on more than three international tours and have performed in over 12 countries.

== Overview ==
The group was a prominent act in the alternative idol and kawaii metal movements. Their name is taken from the Necronomicon, the famous fictional grimoire featured in the work of H. P. Lovecraft, combined with the Japanese words for magic (魔, ma) and necromancy (ネクロ魔, nekuro ma), and "idol". Necronomidol has performed once at the H.P. Lovecraft Film Festival and twice at CthulhuCon, in 2018 and 2020. A number of composers have worked with them, such as Mr. Perkele, who has worked on tracks such as "Ritual" and "Dawnslayer". The group is managed by Ricky Wilson, an American expat living in Tokyo. They began with visuals inspired by a traditional Japanese "shrine maiden" look with "haunting" overtones, first seen in their earliest videos from 2014, but their image later incorporated elements of the Cthulhu mythos as well as modern Japanese and Western horror..

In 2022 the group announced that they would go on a temporary hiatus. In 2025 producer Ricky Wilson conducted a streaming Q&A during which he mentioned that there are no plans to bring NECRONOMIDOL out of hiatus.

== Musical style ==
Necronomidol's style has been described as fusing J-pop with genres ranging from industrial music to punk rock to dark wave to witch house to shoegazing to, most notably, heavy metal, specifically the style of black metal. Because of this, they have been described as kawaii metal and post-black metal.

== Discography ==
=== Studio albums ===
- Nemesis (2016)
- Deathless (2017)
- Voidhymn (2018)
- vämjelseriter (2021)

=== EPs ===
- From Chaos Born (2016)
- Dawn Slayer (2017)
- Strange Aeons (2018)
- Scions of the Blasted Heath (2019)
- l'appel du vide (2022)

=== Singles ===
- "Ikotsu Moufubuki" (2015)
- "Reikon Shoumetsu" (2015)
- "Etranger" (2015)
- "Exitum" (2015)
- "TUPILAQ" (2020)
- "Santa Sangre" (2020)

== Members ==
- Kaede (2014)
- Kagura Nagata (2014)
- Aisa Miyano (2014)
- Rio Maeda (2014)
- Setsuko Henmei (2014–2015)
- Rū Tachibana (2014–2015)
- Karen Kusaka (2015–2016)
- Hotaru Tsukumo (2014–2016)
- Sari (2014–2019, left to focus on solo work)
- Hina Yotsuyu (2015–2019, left to join MANACLE)
- Kunogi Kenbishi (2019)
- Risaki Kakizaki (2014-2020 left to join MANACLE)
- Rei Imaizumi (2016–2020, left to join MANACLE)
- Himari Tsukishiro (2017–2022)
- Michelle (2019–2020)
- Shiki Rukawa (2020–2021, left to focus on solo work, her YouTube channel)
- Roa Toda (2020–2021, left after originally going on hiatus, has collaborated with Shiki on Shiki's YouTube channel)
- Maria Hoshizora (2021, left because of health issues)
- Nana Kamino (2020–2021)
- Towa Amou (2021–2022)
- Hisui Kurogane (2022)
- Meica Mochinaga (2021–2022)
- Malin Kozakura (2021–2022)
