= ZOCX =

Japanese idol girl group

- Also known as: ZOC, Metamuse
- Origin: Japan
- Genres: J-pop, rock
- Years active: 2018–present
- Labels: T-Palette Records; Avex Trax; Hold The Music
- Members: Seiko Oomori; Aimi Chao; Kanano Senritsu; Mayu Sentsubaki; Miyuki Amakuni; Hau NecoNecoNeco
- Past members: Fin Kitoki; Sayaka Unagi; Katy Kashī; Jonah Kirano; Marina Nishii; Maro Kannagi; Riko Yachia; Nodoka Shizume; Karen Aizome

ZOCX, formerly known as ZOC (ゾック; Zone Out of Control) and Metamuse (メタミューズ; stylized in all caps), is a Japanese alternative idol co-ed group that formed in September 2018. Originally a girl group, they released their debut single, "Family Name", on April 30, 2019. On July 7, 2022, the group changed its name to Metamuse, before reverting to ZOC on November 11, 2023. ZOC suspended group activities at the end of March 2024. On January 1, 2025, the group re-formed as ZOCX and became a co-ed group.

== History ==
=== 2018–2019: Formation and debut ===
On September 18, 2018, during Seiko Oomori's birthday event at Liquid Room in Tokyo event ZOC's line-up was revealed as Karen Aizome, Kanano Senritsu, Katy Kashī, Marina Nishii, Fin Kitoki, Sayaka Unagi and Oomori herself. In October, Fin Kitoki withdrew from the group.

On April 30, 2019, ZOC released their debut single, "Family Name", under T-Palette Records. On September 9, they held their first concert, We are ZOC, at Zepp Tokyo. Their second single, "Danshari Kareshi", was released on October 9. On December 23, Sayaka Unagi withdrew from the group.

=== 2020–2021: Major label debut and PvP ===
On March 27, 2020, former Angerme member Maro Kannagi joined the group. On July 8, Kanano Senritsu withdrew from the group. Their third single, "Shinemagic / Hyalu Lonely Girl", was released on July 14. On July 15, the group suspended activities. They resumed activities on August 30. On October 1, they held their relaunch concert, Age of ZOC, at Nakano Sunplaza. During the concert Riko Yachia joined the group and they announced that they would be making their major label debut with Avex Trax.

On January 20, 2021, the group released their fourth single, "Age of ZOC / Don't Trust Teenager”. From January to February, they held the Never Trust ZOC tour. On February 8, at the final date of the tour, Katy Kashī withdrew from the group. From February to March they held the 5★ZOC Tour. On May 13, Nodoka Shizume joined the group. On June 9, the group released their first studio album, PvP. From June to September, they held the ZOC for Prayer Tour. On November 3, ZOC released a split single with Bis. On December 17, they held the concert ZOC Clutch 2021. During the concert, Jonah Kirano joined the group.

=== 2022–2024: Metamuse era, return to ZOC and hiatus ===
From February to April 2022, they held a tour called ZOC RPG Tour 2022 Disc_1. On April 20, ZOC announced that they would change their name to Metamuse on July 7. From April to June, they held a tour called ZOC RPG Tour 2022 Disc_2. On May 28, Jonah Kirano withdrew from the group. On July 6, the group released their fifth single, "Tiffany Tiffany / Wagamama Pajama". On July 7, they held their final concert as ZOC before changing their name to Metamuse. From September to November, they held the Meet the Metamuse μ Tour. On December 24, they held a concert called Metamuse X'Mas Live at KT Zepp Yokohama.

On January 25, 2023, their sixth single, "Metamemento", was released. From March to June, they held the Taboo the Metamuse 2023 Tour. Their seventh single, "Happy Ending Extra Innings", on May 10. On September 26, they released a split single with Mapa. On November 11, the group changed their name back to ZOC, and added Aimi Chao as a new member. From November to February 2024, they held the Queen of Tone Tour.

On January 31, 2024, they released their eighth single, "Queen of Tone / Crush Alone". On March 31, Marina Nishii, Maro Kannagi, Riko Yachia, and Nodoka Shizume left the group and ZOC suspended group activities. Karen Aizome left ZOC on November 4.

=== 2025: ZOCX and re-formation as a co-ed group ===
On January 1, 2025, ZOC renamed to ZOCX and a new line-up was revealed. Seiko and Aimi from the previous line-up remained members, while Kanano Senritsu, a concurrent member of Femme Fatale and Akuma no Kiss, who had left ZOC in July 2020 re-joined, and new members Mayu Sentsubaki, who is a concurrent member of Chinhoza, Miyuki Amakuni, a former member of Mameshiba no Taigun, and Hau NecoNecoNeco, a former member of M!LK, Monoclone, and Yumekui Neon, joined the group. ZOCX became a co-ed group with its first male member Hau NecoNecoNeco. They released their ninth single, "Badface / Endinging", on April 1. On June 6, ZOCX performed alongside Mapa and Piggs at WACK in the UK Vol. 6 which took place at The Underworld in London.

== Members ==
=== Current ===
- Seiko Oomori (大森靖子) (2018–present)
- Aimi Chao (荼緒あいみ) (2023–present)
- Kanano Senritsu (戦慄かなの) (2018–2020; 2025–present)
- Mayu Sentsubaki (千椿真夢) (2025–present)
- Miyuki Amakuni (天國3ゅ姫) (2025–present)
- Hau NecoNecoNeco (猫猫猫はう) (2025–present)

=== Former ===
- Fin Kitoki (葵時フィン) (2018)
- Sayaka Unagi (兎凪さやか) (2018–2019)
- Katy Kashī (香椎かてぃ) (2018–2021)
- Jonah Kirano (吉良乃ジョナ) (2021–2022)
- Marina Nishii (西井万理那) (2018–2024)
- Maro Kannagi (巫まろ) (2020–2024)
- Riko Yachia (雅雀り子) (2020–2024)
- Nodoka Shizume (鎮目のどか) (2021–2024)
- Karen Aizome (藍染カレン) (2018–2024)

== Discography ==
=== Studio albums ===
| Title | Album details | Peak positions | | |
| Title | Album details | JPN | JPN Comb. | JPN Hot |
|---|---|---|---|---|
| PvP | Released: June 9, 2021; Label: Avex Trax; Formats: CD, digital download | 11 | 13 | 16 |

=== Singles ===
| Title | Year | Peak positions | | | Album |
| Title | Year | JPN | JPN Comb. | JPN Hot | Album |
|---|---|---|---|---|---|
| "Family Name" | 2019 | 8 | 15 | — | PvP |
| "Danshari Kareshi" (断捨離彼氏) | 2019 | 6 | 7 | 24 | PvP |
| "Shinemagic / Hyalu Lonely Girl" (Shinemagic / ヒアルロンリーガール) | 2020 | 9 | 41 | — | PvP |
| "Age of ZOC / Don't Trust Teenager" | 2021 | 5 | 35 | — | PvP |
| "Katsurei Girl / Begging" (割礼Girl / Begging) with Bis | 2021 | 14 | — | — | Non-album singles |
| "Tiffany Tiffany / Wagamama Pajama" (Tiffany Tiffany / わがままぱじゃま) | 2022 | 3 | 13 | 76 | Non-album singles |
| "Metamemento" (メタメメント) | 2023 | 3 | — | — | Non-album singles |
| "Happy Ending Extra Innings" (ハッピーエンド延長戦) | 2023 | 12 | — | — | Non-album singles |
| "Ichigo Kanzen Hanzai / Neko no Kuni" (いちご完全犯罪/猫の国) with Mapa | 2023 | 8 | — | — | Non-album singles |
| "Queen of Tone / Crush Alone" | 2024 | 16 | — | — | Non-album singles |
| "Badface / Endinging" | 2025 | 12 | — | — | Non-album singles |
"—" denotes releases that did not chart or were not released in that region.
