= Carry Loose =

Japanese idol girl group

- Origin: Japan
- Genres: J-pop
- Years active: 2019–2020
- Labels: WACK; T-Palette Records
- Past members: Pan Luna Leafy; Yuina Empire; Uruu Ru; Yumeka Nowkana?
- Website: www.carryloose.com

Carry Loose (キャリールーズ), stylized as CARRY LOOSE, was a Japanese alternative idol girl group active from September 2019 to October 2020. They released their debut album, Carry Loose, on October 22, 2019.

== History ==
On June 19, 2019, it was announced that former Bis members Pan Luna Leafy and Yuina Empire, along with Wagg trainee Uruu Ru, would form a new group. The group was given the temporary name Curry Rouxz, and auditions were held for additional members. On September 4, the group's name was finalized as Carry Loose, and a new member, Yumeka Nowkana?, was added. The group's eponymous debut album was released on October 22.

The group's first single, "Ningen," was released on February 11, 2020. From July 20, they broadcast a 24-hour livestream titled "Carry of Major," which continued until they achieved a major label debut. On October 16, after almost three months of livestreaming, it was announced that the group had not achieved a major debut and that they would disband on October 31, 2020. Carry Loose disbanded as planned on October 31, with the release of their second and final single, "Colors."

== Members ==
- Pan Luna Leafy (パン・ルナリーフィ)
- Yuina Empire
- Uruu Ru (ウルウ・ル)
- Yumeka Nowkana? (ユメカ・ナウカナ？)

== Discography ==
=== Studio albums ===
| Title | Album details | Peak chart positions | |
| Title | Album details | Oricon | Hot |
|---|---|---|---|
| Carry Loose | Released: October 22, 2019; Label: T-Palette Records; Formats: CD, digital download | 16 | 17 |

=== Singles ===
| Title | Year | Peak chart positions | | Album |
| Title | Year | Oricon | Billboard | Album |
|---|---|---|---|---|
| "Ningen" (にんげん) | 2020 | 4 | 29 | Non-album singles |
| "Colors" | 2020 | — | — | Non-album singles |
"—" denotes releases that did not chart or were not released in that region.
