= Chō Tokimeki Sendenbu =

Japanese idol group

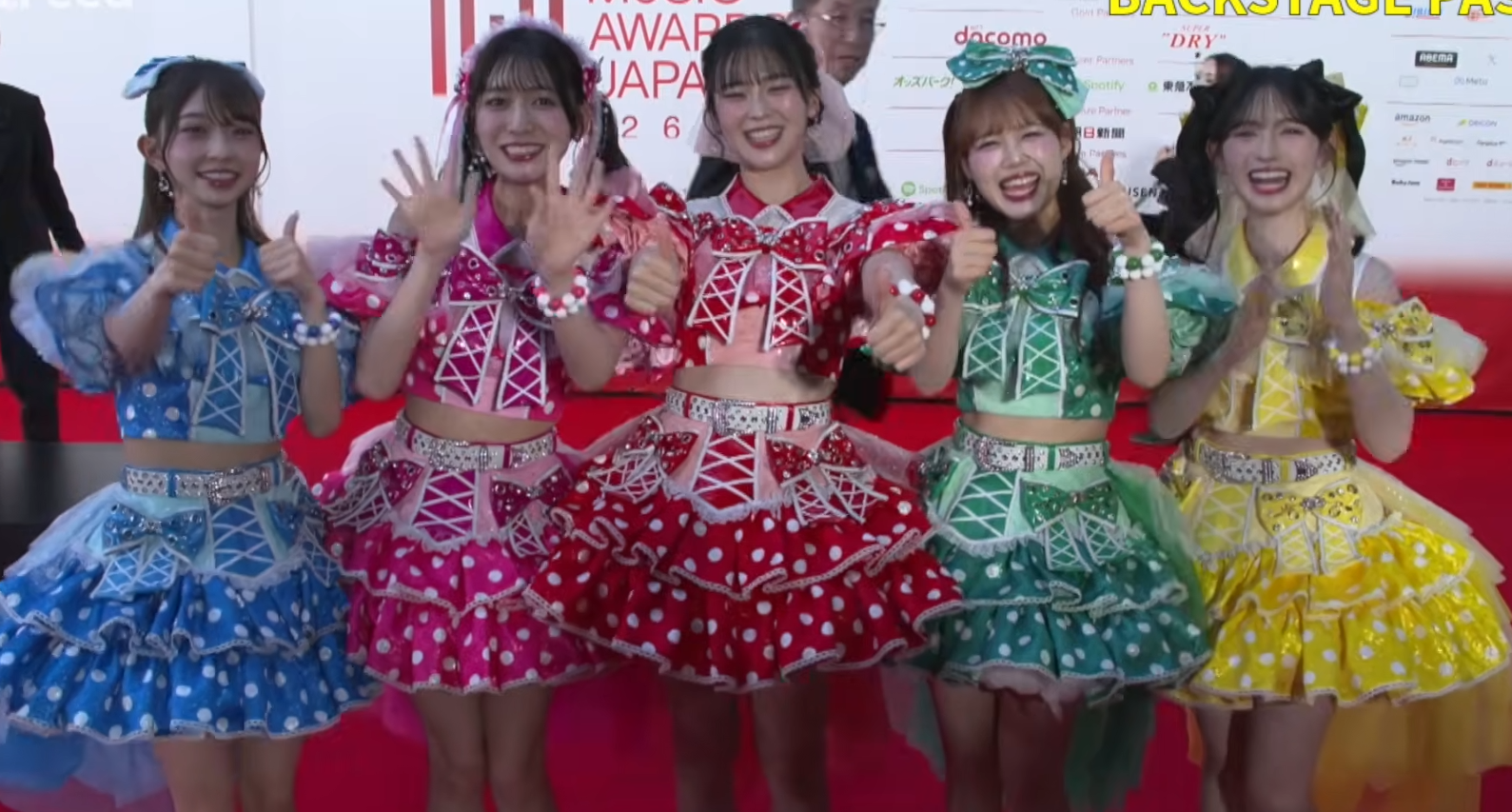
- Chō Tokimeki Sendenbu at the 2026 Music Awards Japan

Background information
- Origin: Tokyo, Japan
- Genres: J-pop; pop
- Years active: 2015–2027
- Labels: SDR (2015–2016); Universal Sigma (2016–2018); Avex Trax (2018–present)
- Members: Kanami Tsujino; Haruka Koizumi; Hitoka Sakai; Hiyori Yoshikawa; Aki Suda
- Past members: Mako Nagasaka; Sala Odaka; Bambi Fujimoto; An Julia
- Website: toki-sen.com

Chō Tokimeki Sendenbu (超ときめき♡宣伝部) is a five-member Japanese girl group, belonging to Stardust Promotion. They was formed as "Tokimeki♡Sendenbu" (ときめき♡宣伝部) on April 11, 2015, and changed its name to "Chō Tokimeki Sendenbu" on April 1, 2020.

== Members ==
Name	Nickname	Color	Birth date and age	Notes
Kanami Tsujino (辻野かなみ)	Kanamin (かなみん)	Cho Tokimeki Blue	June 2, 1999 (age 27)	Leader, Oldest Member
Haruka Koizumi (小泉遥香)	Oharu (おはる)	Cho Tokimeki Pink	January 5, 2001 (age 25)	
Hitoka Sakai (坂井仁香)	Hito-chan (ひとちゃん)	Cho Tokimeki Red	July 25, 2001 (age 25)	
Hiyori Yoshikawa (吉川ひより)	Hiyorin (ひよりん)	Cho Tokimeki Green	August 12, 2001 (age 25)	
Aki Suda (菅田愛貴)	Aki-chan (あきちゃん)	Cho Tokimeki Lemon	December 20, 2004 (age 21)	Joined April 1, 2020; Youngest Member

=== Former ===
Name	Nickname	Color	Birth date and age	Notes
Mako Nagasaka (永坂真心)	Mako-chan (まこちゃん)	Tokimeki Yellow	February 11, 2002 (age 24)	April 11, 2015 - March 20, 2017, She retired from the entertainment world.
Sala Odaka (小高サラ)	Salala (サララ)	Tokimeki Purple	November 18, 2003 (age 22)	June 18, 2017 - October 7, 2018, She is an actress in Stardust Promotion now.
Bambi Fujimoto (藤本ばんび)	Bambi (ばんび)	Tokimeki Lemon	June 5, 2004 (age 22)	June 18, 2017 - March 31, 2020, She is an actress in Stardust Promotion now.
Julia An (杏ジュリア)	Juli (ジュリ)	Cho Tokimeki Purple	January 15, 2004 (age 22)	October 14, 2018 - March 29, 2026, She is still affiliated with Stardust Promotion.

== History ==
On February 15, 2021, their fan-club was founded. The first fan-club event was held at Sanrio Puroland on April 24. On May 29 and 30, the first arena solo live performances occurred at Arena Tachikawa Tachihi. From August 21 to September 5, they held a Zepp tour at five locations nationwide: Sapporo, Nagoya, Fukuoka, Tokyo and Osaka. On December 26, Avex Pictures hosted a worldwide livestream of Cho Tokimeki Sendenbu's Doki-doki Christmas Party 2021. The song "Suki!" went viral on TikTok, and the mini-album "Suki Suki Suki Suki Suki Suki!", Which includes the re-recorded and rearranged version, "Suki! ~Cho ver~", was released on September 29. On December 17, they performed on TikTokMusicNight 2021Rewind.

The group announced on July 1, 2026 that they would be concluding their activities after a final concert in the spring of 2027.

== Discography ==
=== Singles ===
No.	Title	Songs	Release date	Charts	
No.	Title	Songs	Release date	JPN Oricon	Sales
Indie singles (SDR)
1	"Dokkyun!! Shōjo" (土っキュン♡!!少女)	1. "Dokkyun!! Shōjo" (土っキュン♡!!少女); 2. "Daijiman Friends" (大事マン☆フレンズ, Daijiman Furenzu); 3. "Bokura no Mirai" (僕らの未来)	June 24, 2015	13	7,317
2	"Kisetsu-hazure no Tokimeki Summer" (季節外れのときめき♡サマー, Kisetsu-hazure Tokimeki Samā)	1. "Kisetsu-hazure no Tokimeki Summer" (季節外れのときめき♡サマー, Kisetsu-hazure Tokimeki Samā); 2. "Pyon-pyon" (ぴょんぴょん); 3. "Don't Worry!" (ドンウォーリー!); 4. "Santa-san ga... Yattekonai!" (サンタさんが･････やってこない!)	December 2, 2015	8	11,503
3	"Muteki no Uta" (むてきのうた)	1. "Muteki no Uta" (むてきのうた); 2. "Lemon Juice" (レモンジュース, Remon Jūsu); 3. "Beauty" (ビューティー, Byūtī); 4. "100% Orange" (100%オレンジ)	June 1, 2016	4	21,850
Major-label singles (Universal Sigma)					
1	"Gamba!!" (ガンバ!!)	1. "Ganba!!" (ガンバ!!); 2. "Seishun Anthem" (青春アンセム, Seishun Ansemu); 3. "Sekigae no Uta" (せきがえのうた); 4. "Iza, Yamatonadeshiko" (いざ、大和撫子)	November 9, 2016	13	10,236
2	"Do-Do-Do-Do Dreamer" (どどどどどりーまー, Do-Do-Do-Do-Dorīmā)	1. "Do-Do-Do-Do Dreamer" (どどどどどりーまー, Do-Do-Do-Do-Dorīmā); 2. "Fure! Fure!" (フレ!フレ!); 3. "Caramel" (キャラメル, Kyarameru); 4. "Gusuka P" (ぐーすかP)	June 7, 2017	7	13,105
3	"Dead Heat"	1. "Dead Heat"; 2. "Big Bang" (ビッグ☆バン, Biggu Ban); 3. "Banbanban"; 4. "Hatsukoi Cycling" (初恋サイクリング, Hatsukoi Saikuringu); 5. "Chocolate Truffle	November 22, 2017	5	18,521
Major-label singles (Avex)
4	"Tokimeki Sendenbu no Victory Story" (ときめき♡宣伝部のVICTORY STORY)/"Seishun Heart Shaker" (青春ハートシェイカー, Seishun Hāto Sheikā)	1. "Tokimeki Sendenbu no Victory Story" (ときめき♡宣伝部のVICTORY STORY); 2. "Seishun Heart Shaker" (青春ハートシェイカー); 3. "Don't Fiction" (ドンフィクション, Don Fikushon); 4. "Kimi ni Muchū Girl" (きみに夢中ガール, Kimi ni Muchū Gāru); 5. "Springood!"	April 10, 2019	3	38,550
5	"Koi no Shape Up" (恋のシェイプアップ♡, Koi no Sheipu Appu)	1. "Koi no Shape Up" (恋のシェイプアップ♡); 2. "Mōsō Pool Date" (妄想プールデート, Mōsō Pūru Dēto); 3. "Jinsei Saikō no Melody" (人生最幸のメロディ, Jinsei Saikō no Merodi); 4. "Ippōtsūkō, Koi no Wana" (一方通行、恋の罠); 5. "Ei-Ei-Oh!"	October 9, 2019	2	27,380
6	"Tomorrow Saikyō Setsu!!" (トゥモロー最強説!!, Tumorō Saikyō Setsu!!)	1. "Tomorrow Saikyō Setsu!!" (トゥモロー最強説!!, Tumorō Saikyō Setsu!!); 2. "Koi no Jackal" (恋のジャッカル, Koi no Jakkaru); 3. "Ichizuiro no Bench" (いちず色のベンチ, Ichizuiro no Benchi); 4. "Watashi, Number One Girl!" (わたし、ナンバーワンガール！, Watashi, Nambā Wan Gāru!)	August 26, 2020	7	14,079
7	"STAR"	1. "STAR"; 2. "Wagamama Princess" (わがままプリンセス, Wagamama Purinsesu); 3. "Hop Step Jump Love" (ホップステップジャンプLOVE)	November 11, 2022	5	18,302
8	"Love Iya-iya Ki" (LOVEイヤイヤ期)	1. "Love Iya-iya Ki" (LOVEイヤイヤ期); 2. "Doki-doki, Doki-doki" (ドキドキ ドキドキ); 3. "Hirari Hira-hira" (ひらり ひらひら); 4. "Zettai da yo" (ゼッタイだよ)	May 10, 2023	4	30,207
9	"Kawaii Memorial" (かわいいメモリアル, Kawaii Memoriaru)	1. "Kawaii Memorial" (かわいいメモリアル, Kawaii Memoriaru); 2. "Motto Motto Mō Chotto" (もっともっと もうちょっと); 3. "Wanted"; 4. "Kimi to Seishun" (きみと青春)	September 27, 2023	3	33,183
10	"Saijōkyu ni Kawaii no!" (最上級にかわいいの!)	1. "Saijōkyu ni Kawaii no!" (最上級にかわいいの!); 2. "Shishishi!" (ししし!); 3. "Tokimeki Party" (ときめきパーティ, Tokimeki Pāti); 4. "Retry, Seishun!" (リトライ、青春!, Ritorai, Seishun!)	May 29, 2024	4	49,032
11	"Sekai de Ichiban Idol/Himitsu no Fufufu" (世界でいちばんアイドル/ひみつのふふふ)	1. "Sekai de Ichiban Idol" (世界でいちばんアイドル, Sekai de Ichiban Aidoru); 2. "Himitsu no Fufufu" (ひみつのふふふ); 3. "Setsuna Revenge" (セツナリベンジ, Setsuna Ribenji)	April 30, 2025	2	72,899
12	"Heart na Mune no Uchi♡/Cho Saikyo" (ハートな胸の内♡/超最強)	1. "Heart na Mune no Uchi♡" (ハートな胸の内♡); 2. "Cho Saikyo" (超最強); 3. "Cinderella no Lalala" (シンデレラのラララ♡, Shinderera no Rarara); 4. "Magokoro My Heart" (まごころ My Heart)	August 27, 2025	2	82,347
13	"Dream Jumbo!" (どりーむじゃんぼ！)	1. "Dream Jumbo!" (どりーむじゃんぼ！); 2. "Kurae, Otome naki!" (くらえ、乙女泣き！); 3. "Tough na Girl" (タフなガール)	May 20, 2026	2	80,874
14	"Omori Happy" (大盛りハッピー)		September 30, 2026	3	123,267

=== Albums ===
No.	Title	Songs	Release date	Charts	
No.	Title	Songs	Release date	JPN Oricon	Sales
Major label albums (Universal Sigma)					
1	Toki Otome (ときおとめ)	1. "Otome no Glorious" (乙女のグロリアス, Otome no Guroriasu); 2. "Gamba!!" (ガンバ!!); 3. "Sonic Adventure" (音速(ソニック)アドベンチャー, Sonikku Adobenchā); 4. "Do Do Do Do Dreamer" (どどどどどりーまー); 5. "Sweet Sweet Days"; 6. "Tōku de Agaru Hanabi, Futari Narande Miteta" (遠くであがる花火 二人ならんで見てた); 7. "Princess Princess Princess" (プリンセスプリンセスプリンセス, Purinsesu Purinsesu Purinsesu); 8. "PaPiPoPi Pop Girl" (PaPiPoPiポップガール); 9. "Trap"; 10. "Ai ni Kichatta" (あいにきちゃった); 11. "Kitakore! Morning" (キタコレ!モーニング, Kitakore Mōningu); 12. "Tōmei Heart" (トウメイ恋心(ハート)); 13. "Suki!" (すきっ!); 14. "Dead Heat!"; 15. "Sonna Mainichi" (そんな毎日)	April 11, 2018	9	8,568
Major-label albums (Avex)
2	Tokimeki ga Subete (ときめきがすべて)	1. "Tomorrow Saikyō Setsu!!" (トゥモロー最強説!!); 2. "Shibuya Tsutaya Mae de Machiawase ne!" (Shibuya Tsutaya前で待ち合わせね！); 3. "Endless" (エンドレス); 4. "Koi no Shape Up♡ (Cho ver.)" (恋のシェイプアップ♡ (超ver.)); 5. "Lion Girl" (ライオンガール); 6. "7 Gatsu no Cider" (7月のサイダー); 7. "Sakura SanSan" (さくら燦々); 8. "Cho Tokimeki♡Sendenbu no Victory Story" (超ときめき♡宣伝部のVictory Story); 9. "Otodoke! Delivery Star" (お届け！デリバリースター); 10. "Gamushara (Cho ver.)" (Gamushara (超ver.)); 11. "Ameagari" (雨上がり); 12. "Seishun Heart Shaker (Cho ver.)" (青春ハートシェイカー (超ver.))	December 23, 2020	26	4,871
3	Tokimeku Koi to Seishun (ときめく恋と青春)	#"HapiLaBlue!" (ハピラブルー!): 1. "Kawaii Memorial" (かわいいメモリアル); 2. "Saijōkyu ni Kawaii no!" (最上級にかわいいの!); 3. "Kimi to Sugosu Hibi" (君と過ごす日々); 4. "Star"; 5. "Sora"; 6. "Dai, Dai, Daisuki!" (大、大、大すきっ!); 7. "Yume ga Tomaranai!" (夢がとまらない!); 8. "Love Iya-iya Ki" (LOVEイヤイヤ期); 9. "Lami Lami" (ラミラミ, Rami Rami); 10. "Yuragu Love" (ユラグラブ, Yuragu Rabu)	January 24, 2024	1	29,580
4	Tokimeku Rule Book (ときめきルールブック)	1. "Konna Atashi wa Ika ga desu ka" (こんなあたしはいかがですか); 2. "Hakken Positive Monster!!" (発見!ポジティブ☆モンスター!!); 3. ""Choma" (ちょま); 4. "We Can Do It Now!"; 5. "Tokidoki Sentimental" (ときどきセンチメンタル, Tokidoki Senchimentaru); 6. "Mikansei Girl" (未完成ガール); 7. "Shitagaki no Koi" (下書きの恋); 8. "Chō Saikyō" (超最強); 9. "Kimi ni Totte no Shiawase ni naritai no" (きみにとっての幸せになりたいの); 10. "Princess Hero" (プリンセスヒーロー); 11. "Saijōkyu ni Kawaii no!" (最上級にかわいいの!)	December 4, 2024	3	53,416
5	Tokimeku Egao (ときめきえがお)	1. "Sekai de Ichiban Idol" (世界でいちばんアイドル, Sekai de Ichiban Aidoru); 2. "Egao de Cho Kansha" (笑顔で超感謝); 3. "Watashi ga Choco desu♡" (私がチョコです♡); 4. "Kira Kira Mirai" (キラキラミライ); 5. "Gamengoshi no Angel " (画面越しのエンジェル); 6. "Acchi Muite Kyun" (あっち向いてキュン); 7. "JIRI JIRI"; 8. "Himitsu no Fufufu" (ひみつのふふふ); 9. "Heart na Mune no Uchi♡" (ハートな胸の内♡); 10. "Suki Suki Skip" (すきすきすきっぷ！); 11. "Kaika Sengen!" (開花宣言！); 12. "Born To Be Smile"	March 4, 2026	1	85,682

=== EPs ===
No.	Title	Songs	Release date	Charts	
No.	Title	Songs	Release date	JPN Oricon	Sales
1	Suki Suki Suki Suki Suki Suki! (すきすきすきすきすきすきっ!)	1. "Suki! (Chō ver.)" (すきっ！〜超ver〜); 2. "Muteki no Uta (2021 ver.)" (むてきのうた〜2021ver〜); 3. "Ai Song!" (愛Song!); 4. "Love nano" (ラヴなのっ♡); 5. "Jankenpon" (ジャンケンポン); 6. "Chō Step Up" (超ステップアップ)	September 29, 2021	16	5,077
2	Heart Gyutto! (ハートギュッと!)	1. "Gyutto!" (ギュッと!); 2. "Cupid in Love"; 3. "Memories"; 4. "Kitto Standard" (きっとスタンダード); 5. "Nandemo Ii kara" (なんでもいいから); 6. "Dear Friend"	June 22, 2022	5	12,813

=== Solo singles ===
Title	Release date	Member
"Tsuyoku Naru" (ツヨクなる)	December 31, 2016	Kanami Tsujino
"Shine"	December 24, 2017	Hitoka Sakai
"Dareyori Ichiban" (誰よりいちばん)	December 24, 2018	Hitoka Sakai
"Shiny Pink"	January 6, 2025	Haruka Koizumi
"Unubore Kurai de Iijanai" (うぬぼれくらいでいいじゃない)	January 16, 2025	Julia An
"Happy Time"	June 3, 2025	Kanami Tsujino
"Honey Trigger" (ハニートリガー)	July 26, 2025	Hitoka Sakai
"Raise demo Hokoreru Jinsei wo!" (来世でも誇れる人生をっ！)	August 13, 2025	Hiyori Yoshikawa
"100000000man Percent Ai" (100000000万％愛♡)	December 21, 2025	Aki Suda
