= Sweety (Japanese band) =

Japanese idol group

- Origin: Japan
- Genres: J-pop; anisong
- Years active: 2012–2015
- Labels: Universal Music Japan
- Past members: Yui Hasegawa; Yurika Takagi; Sayaka Takenouchi
- Website: Official website

Sweety (スウィーティー) was a Japanese female idol group. The trio was formed when they were attending Holy Peak Voice Actor's School. All the members are also voice actresses recently represented by Universal Music (Japan) LLC.

== Members ==
- Yui Hasegawa (長谷川唯, Hasegawa Yui; October 16)
- Sayaka Takenouchi (Sta-chan)
- Yurika Takagi (Yuripon)
