= Piggs =

Japanese idol girl group

- Origin: Japan
- Genres: J-pop; rock
- Years active: 2020–2026
- Labels: PourPourLand; Ariola Japan
- Past members: Pour Lui; Ban-Ban; Shellme; Chiyo-P; Umi; Kinchan; Bibi; Su-ring

Piggs (Produce Idol Go to world is Good Society), was a Japanese alternative idol girl group that formed in April 2020. They released their debut album, Hallo Piggs, on July 1, 2020. They disbanded on October 12, 2026.

== History ==
=== 2020–2021: Formation, debut with Hallo Piggs and Juicyy ===
On January 6, 2020, Pour Lui announced that she would produce a new idol group which she would also be a member of. The group was given the temporary name Idol Laboratories (アイドル研究所, Idol Kenkyūjo) and the audition process was documented on Pour Lui's YouTube channel. On February 29, auditions were re-opened after an audition winner withdrew from the group. At the beginning of April, during the COVID-19 pandemic, Pour Lui revealed that the group were living together. On April 19, the final line-up was unveiled and their first song, "Kicks", was released on YouTube.

Their debut album, Hallo Piggs, was released on July 1. From November to December, they held the Walk or Pork Tour. Their first EP, 5 Kill Stars, was released on December 16. On December 28, they held a concert named Piggy Bad Hip at Tsutaya O-East.

From March to April 2021, they held the Great Muscle Tour. On April 13, Umi withdrew from the group. Their first single, "T.A.K.O", was released on April 21. On June 27, they performed four times at Tokyo Kinema Club in a show titled Boo Boo Zoo. In July, they held the Dead, Jail or Piggs Tour. They released their second single, "Visitor", on July 21.

On August 27, they held a concert named Boo Boo Summer at Spotify O-nest, followed by the Naked Born Naked Die concert at Club Asia on September 2. In September they held an event called Family Butchers where they performed five joint shows over five days at different venues in Tokyo with Arukara, Zazen Boys, Nichome no Sakigake Coming Out, Tentenko, and Nigami 17th Birthday. On September 18, during the final show of the tour, Kinchan was introduced as a new member. From November to January 2022, they held the Dear Hunter Tour. Their second studio album, Juicyy, was released on December 22.

=== 2022–2023: Indie singles, major label debut and Rawpig ===
From February to May 2022, they held the Soul Meat 2929 Tour. On March 30, they released their third single, "Chīsana Sakebi" (小さな叫び). On June 12, they held a concert named Battle of Piggs at Daikanyama Unit. In July, they held the Because I Love Piggs Tour. On July 13, the group released their fourth and fifth indie singles, "Buta Hankotsu Seishin-Ron" (豚反骨精神論) and "Burning Pride". On August 20, they held the concert Boo Boo Summer 2 at Tokyo Kinema Club. From October to January 2023, they held the Zenshin Zenrei! Moeru Buta Tamashī Tour (全身全霊！燃える豚魂ツアー).

On January 11, 2023, they made the major label debut with their sixth single, "Makenna Baby" (負けんな Baby), was released through Ariola Japan. From March to April, they held the Boo Shut Boo Shout Tour (ブシャーッとブーシャウトツアー). They released their seventh single "Boo!Shut" on April 12. Chiyo-P withdrew from Piggs on May 27. On April 19, their third anniversary concert was held at Live House Fever, followed by the Stand 4 Piggs Tour in May. In July, they held the Piggs Have The Power Tour. Their third eighth single, "You Know Me", was released on July 19. On July 27, two new members, Bibi and Su-ring joined the group.

On August 20, they held the concert Boo Boo Summer 3 at Shibuya WWW. Their second joint tour, Family Butchers: Road to Zepp Haneda, was held from September to October with Suichū, Sore wa Kurushī, Wagamama Rakia, Nichome no Sakigake Coming Out, Metamuse, Clitoric Ris, Mapa, and Narlow. The Suck of Full Monty Tour also took place from September to October. Their third studio album, Rawpig, was released on October 25. On December 27, they held an end of year concert at Spotify O-West called Boonenkai.

=== 2024–2025: Return to indie and Pour Lui's graduation ===
From January to March 2024, they held the Dirty Epic Tour. On February 28, they released their ninth single, "Machi Underworld" (街underworld). On June 12 and 15, they held the Boo Boo Summer 4 concerts in Tokyo and Osaka. They released their second EP, Ichi Milli Demo (1ミリでも) on July 17. From July to August, they held the Saredo, Yoru wa Akeru Tour (されど、夜は明ける Tour). At the final date of the tour, Piggs announced that they would leave major label Ariola Japan and return to their independent label PourPourLand. On October 30, they released their tenth single, "Superbad". In November, they held the Boo Boo Zoo Tour.

Their eleventh single, "Ikite Kaeru, Bakka." (生きて帰る、ばっか。), was released on February 26, 2025. On June 6, Piggs performed alongside Mapa and ZOCX at WACK in the UK Vol. 6 which took place at The Underworld in London. Pour Lui graduated from Piggs on November 29, at the end of their Bang a Gong Tour.

=== 2026: Piggs Rebellion and disbandment ===
From February to April, they held the Taiyou wo Koero! Super Novash Tour, their only tour since Pour Lui's departure. Their fourth and final, Piggs Rebellion, was released on April 1.

On July 30, Piggs announced that they would disband with their one-man concert, Piggs Final Live, on October 12.

== Members ==
=== Final Line-Up ===
- Ban-Ban (バンバン)
- Shellme (シェルミー)
- Kinchan (キンチャン)
- Bibi (ビビ)
- Su-ring (スーリン)

=== Former ===
- Umi (ウミ)
- Chiyo-P (チヨピー)
- Pour Lui (プー・ルイ)

== Discography ==
=== Studio albums ===
Title	Album details	Peak positions	
Title	Album details	JPN Oricon	JPN Billboard
Hallo Piggs	Released: July 1, 2020; Label: PourPourLand; Formats: CD, digital download	43	95
Juicyy	Released: December 22, 2021; Label: PourPourLand; Formats: CD, digital download	24	20
Rawpig	Released: October 25, 2023; Label: Ariola Japan; Formats: CD, digital download	15	13
Piggs Rebellion (ピグス・リベリオン)	Released: April 1, 2026; Label: PourPourLand; Formats: CD, digital download	16	—

=== Extended plays ===
Title	EP details	Peak positions	
Title	EP details	JPN Oricon	JPN Billboard
5 Kill Stars	Released: December 16, 2020; Label: PourPourLand; Formats: CD, digital download	29	35
Ichi Milli Demo (1ミリでも)	Released: July 17, 2024; Label: PourPourLand; Formats: CD, digital download	10	14

=== Singles ===
Title	Year	Peak positions		Album
Title	Year	JPN Oricon	JPN Billboard	Album
"T.A.K.O"	2021	9	—	Juicyy
"Visitor"	2021	12	—	Juicyy
"Chīsana Sakebi" (小さな叫び)	2022	5	—	Non-album singles
"Buta Hankotsu Seishin-Ron" (豚反骨精神論)	2022	8	—	Non-album singles
"Burning Pride"	2022	8	99	Non-album singles
"Makenna Baby" (負けんな Baby)	2023	7	—	Rawpig
"Boo!Shut"	2023	9	—	Rawpig
"You Know Me"	2023	7	—	Rawpig
"Machi Underworld" (街underworld)	2024	12	—	Non-album singles
"Superbad"	2024	14	—	Non-album singles
"Ikite Kaeru, Bakka." (生きて帰る、ばっか。)	2025	16	—	Non-album singles
"—" denotes a recording that did not chart or was not released in that territory.
