= Maison Book Girl =

Japanese idol girl group

- Origin: Japan
- Genres: J-pop
- Years active: 2014–2021
- Labels: Ekoms; Tokuma Shoten; Pony Canyon; Read the Air Records
- Past members: Kaori Sōmoto; Megumi Koshōji; Aoi Yagawa; Yui Inoue; Rin Wada
- Website: www.maisonbookgirl.com

Maison Book Girl (stylized as Maison book girl) was a Japanese alternative idol girl group formed in 2014. They released their debut album, Bath Room, on September 23, 2015. They disbanded on May 30, 2021.

== History ==
At Bis' final concert on July 8, 2014, Megumi Koshōji announced that she would form a new idol group. On November 5, the final line-up was revealed. They released their debut singles, "White" and "Black", exclusively at their live shows from March 14, 2015. On March 27, Kaori Sōmoto left the group and Rin Wada joined. The group released their debut studio album, Bath Room, on September 23. On April 30, 2016, they released the EP Summer Continue, followed by the single "River (Cloudy Irony)" on November 30, which would be their first release under Tokuma Shoten. Their second album, Image, was released on April 5, 2017. The single "412" was released on July 19, 2017, followed by "Cotoeri" on December 13, In early 2018, the group signed with UK label, Read The Air Records. They released the single "Elude" on June 20, 2018, which would be their first release under Pony Canyon. Their third studio album, Yume, was released on November 21. The single "Soup" was released on April 3, 2019, followed by "Umbla" on July 31. Their fourth studio album, Umi to Uchu no Kodomotachi, was released on December 18, 2019. Their first compilation album, Fiction, which was due to be released April 29, 2020, was postponed to June 24 due to the COVID-19 pandemic. On May 30, 2021, after Maison book girl's Solitude Hotel concert at Maihama Amphitheater it was announced that the group had disbanded and that a Blu-ray of the concert would be released on August 18.

== Members ==
=== Final line-up ===
- Megumi Koshōji (コショージ メグミ)
- Aoi Yagawa (矢川葵)
- Yui Inoue (井上唯)
- Rin Wada (和田輪)

=== Former ===
- Kaori Sōmoto (宗本花音里)

== Discography ==
=== Studio albums ===
Title	Album details	Peak positions	
Title	Album details	JPN Oricon	JPN Billboard
Bath Room	Released: September 23, 2015; Label: Ekoms; Formats: CD, digital download	84	—
Image	Released: April 5, 2017; Label: Tokuma Japan Communications; Formats: CD, digital download	26	48
Yume	Released: November 21, 2018; Label: Pony Canyon; Formats: CD, digital download	27	51
Umi to Uchu no Kodomotachi (海と宇宙の子供たち)	Released: December 18, 2019; Label: Pony Canyon; Formats: CD, digital download	38	49
"—" denotes a recording that did not chart or was not released in that territory.

=== Compilation albums ===
Title	Album details	Peak positions	
Title	Album details	JPN Oricon	JPN Billboard
Fiction	Released: June 24, 2020; Label: Pony Canyon; Formats: CD, digital download	29	29

=== Extended plays ===
Title	Album details	Peak positions
Title	Album details	JPN Oricon
Summer Continue	Released: March 30, 2016; Label: Ekoms; Formats: CD, digital download	43

=== Singles ===
Title	Year	Peak positions		Album
Title	Year	JPN Oricon	JPN Billboard	Album
"River (Cloudy Irony)"	2016	30	86	Non-album singles
"412"	2017	33	—	Non-album singles
"Cotoeri"	2017	26	77	Yume
"Elude"	2018	27	—	Yume
"Soup"	2019	17	—	Umi to Uchu no Kodomotachi
"Umbla"	2019	19	—	Umi to Uchu no Kodomotachi
"—" denotes a recording that did not chart or was not released in that territory.

== Filmography ==
=== Blu-rays ===
Title	Album details	Peak positions
Title	Album details	JPN Oricon
Solitude Hotel 2F+Faithlessness	Released: February 15, 2017; Label: Tokuma Japan Communications; Formats: Blu-ray	16
Solitude Hotel	Released: August 18, 2021; Label: Pony Canyon; Formats: Blu-ray	25
"—" denotes a recording that did not chart or was not released in that territory.
