= T-Palette Records =

- Parent company: Tower Records Japan Inc.
- Founded: June 3, 2011
- Founder: Ikuo Minewaki
- Genre: J-pop (idols)
- Country of origin: Japan
- Location: Aoyama, Minato, Tokyo
- Official website: tower.jp/label/t-paletterecords

T-Palette Records is a Japanese record label, specializing in idols. It is a subsidiary of the Japanese franchise of Tower Records.

== History ==
The record label was launched in June 2011.

The first artist of the new label, Vanilla Beans, was rented to it by Tokuma Japan Communications. Such an unusual case when an artist was transferred from one record label to another on rent, attracted attention in the media.

== Roster ==
=== Current ===
As of May 4, 2014.

- Vanilla Beans (since June 2011; rented from Tokuma Japan)
- Negicco (since July 2011)
- Shizukaze & Kizuna (しず風&絆〜KIZUNA〜) (Shizukaze since November 2011, Kizuna since March 2012)
- Lyrical School (since 2012; transferred from File Records)
- Up Up Girls (Kakko Kari) (since 2012; transferred from the independent record label Up-Front Works; the transfer announced at the concert titled Up Up Girls (Kakko Kari) 1st Live Daikan'yama Kessen (Kakko Kari))
- Caramel Ribbon (キャラメル☆リボン) (since summer 2013)
- Na-Na (NA-NA) (since summer 2013)
- One Little Kiss (ワンリルキス) (since summer 2013)
- amihime (since February 2014; solo project of LinQ member Ami Himesaki; announced at the concert titled T-Palette Records Thanksgiving 2013)

=== Former ===
- LinQ (November 2011 – February 2013)
- RHYMEBERRY (ライムベリー) (since March 2013; joined from Aries Entertainment)
- Tomato n'Pine — only live DVDs

== Events ==
- T-Palette Records 1st. Anniversary Live (9 June 2012, Harajuku Astro Hall)
- T-Palette Records Kansha-sai 2012 (9 December 2012, Shinagawa Stellar Ball)
- T-Palette Records Kansha-sai 2013 (December 15, 2013, Laforet Museum Roppongi)
