= Tokyo Idol Festival =

Japanese annual music festival

- Genre: J-pop
- Frequency: Annually
- Locations: Tokyo, Japan
- Inaugurated: August 2010
- Attendance: 80,000 (2017)
- Leader: Rino Sashihara (2017–2021); Neru Nagahama (2021–2026); Nagi Inoue (2026–present)
- Website: www.idolfes.com

The Tokyo Idol Festival (stylized in all caps; abbreviated as TIF) is an annual music festival featuring live performances by female idol groups and solo idols from all over Japan.

== History ==
The first edition of the Tokyo Idol Festival was held in 2010 in Shinagawa.

In 2011, the location of the festival was moved to Odaiba.

In 2014, The Wall Street Journal included the TIF as one of five places in Japan to enjoy summer music festivals.

In 2017, more than 200 idol groups and about 1,500 idols performed, attracting more than 80,000 spectators. Rino Sashihara of HKT48 and STU48 was appointed chairman that year.

The festival was held completely online in 2020 due to the COVID-19 pandemic, and in hybrid form in 2021. Former Keyakizaka46 member Neru Nagahama succeeded Sashihara as chairman in July that year.

Nagi Inoue of Nogizaka46 was appointed the chairman of Tokyo Idol Festival on March 10, 2026, succeeding Nagahama.

== Editions ==
=== 2010 ===
==== Dates ====
- August 6 – Night before festival
- August 7 – Day/Night 1
- August 8 – Day/Night 2

2010 Artists

As listed on the official Tokyo Idol Festival website.

- Afilia Saga East
- Anela
- Bakunyuu Koushien
- Bakunyuu Sangokushi
- Bakunyuu Sentai Pyranger
- Bakunyuu Yankee
- Bikyaku Sentai Slender
- Circadian Rhythm
- Cocolo Colon
- Cream
- D-Rive
- D-trance
- DearStage All Stars
- DokiDoki Dream Campus
- Fudanjuku
- Hopclub
- Hoshi no Otome Uta Gekidan
- Idol College
- Idol School
- Idoling!!!
- Jewel Kiss
- JK21
- Love Bowlers
- Mai×Nao
- Minami Momochi
- Mini Cheer Bears
- Momoiro Clover
- Mune no Tanima ni Umore Tai
- Nakano Fujo Sisters
- Natural Point
- Panda Neko~zu
- Passpo
- Pinkish
- Sakura Gakuin
- Shiritsu Ebisu Chugaku
- Shizukaze
- Starmarie
- Super Girls
- Techpri
- Tokyo Girls' Style
- Tomato n'Pine
- Vanilla Beans
- Wata Chu
- YGA
- Young Gangan

=== 2011 ===
==== Dates ====
- August 24–26 – Nights before festival
- August 27 – Day 1
- August 28 – Day 2
- August 29 – Night after festival

2011 Artists

As listed on the official Tokyo Idol Festival website.

- 9nine
- Aell.
- Afilia Saga East
- Alice No. 10
- BA5
- Bitter Sweetz
- Choice?
- Chu! Lips
- Circadian Rhythm
- Dempagumi.inc
- Dorothy Little Happy
- Erina Mano
- Fanta Peace
- Feam
- Fine
- Forchun
- Fudanjuku
- G Girls
- Gal Doll
- Hopclub
- Idol College
- Idol Street Street-sei
- Idoling!!!
- Jewel Kiss
- JK21
- KNU23
- Lovely Doll
- Mai×Nao
- Minami Momochi
- Mini Cheer Bears
- Mugiwara Musume
- Nakano Fujo Sisters
- Natural Point
- Oh Campee
- Okite Porsche
- Panda Neko~zu
- Passpo
- Pinkish
- Predia
- Ram
- Rizumu
- Sakura Gakuin
- Secret Girls
- Sexy All Stars
- Shiritsu Ebisu Chugaku
- Shizukaze with Kizuna
- Space Girls Planet
- Super Girls
- Survive Zero
- Techpri
- The Possible
- Tokyo Cheer Party
- Tokyo Girls' Style
- Usa Usa Shoujo Club
- Vanilla Beans
- Vic:cess
- W Anna
- YGA

=== 2012 ===
==== Dates ====
- August 3 – Night before festival
- August 4 – Day 1
- August 5 – Day 2

2012 Artists

As listed on the official Tokyo Idol Festival website.

- Bis
- E-girls
- Idol Street
- Lyrical School
- Sakura Gakuin
- SKE48
- Super Girls

=== 2013 ===
==== Dates ====
- July 27 – Day 1
- July 28 – Day 2

2013 Artists

As listed on the official Tokyo Idol Festival website.

- Afilia Saga
- Especia
- Lyrical School
- LinQ
- Sakura Gakuin
- Super Girls

=== 2014 ===
==== Dates ====
- August 2 – Day 1
- August 3 – Day 2

2014 Artists

As listed on the official Tokyo Idol Festival website.

- Sakura Gakuin

=== 2015 ===
==== Dates ====
- July 25 – Night before festival
- August 1 – Day 1
- August 2 – Day 2

2015 Artists

As listed on the official Tokyo Idol Festival website.

- 9nine
- Akishibu Project
- Ayami Mutō
- HKT48
- Idol College
- Idoling!!!
- Idol Renaissance
- ORANGE PORT
- OtomeBrave
- Passcode
- Sakura Gakuin
- SKE48

=== 2016 ===
==== Dates ====
- August 5 – Day 1
- August 6 – Day 2
- August 7 – Day 3

2016 Artists

As listed on the official Tokyo Idol Festival website.

- 9nine
- Idol College
- LinQ
- Marina Kawano
- Sakura Gakuin
- You Kikkawa

=== 2017 ===
==== Dates ====
- August 4 – Day 1
- August 5 – Day 2
- August 6 – Day 3

2017 Artists

As listed on the official Tokyo Idol Festival website.

- =Love
- 9nine
- AKB48
- Ayane Fujisaki
- Band Ja Naimon!
- Bis
- Camellia Factory
- Crown Pop
- Erabareshi
- Gang Parade
- HKT48
- Idol College
- Junsui Coffee Latte
- LinQ
- Mirin Furukawa
- Niji no Conquistador
- Nogizaka46
- Sakura Gakuin
- Super Girls
- You Kikkawa
- Yui Moriwaki

=== 2018 ===
==== Dates ====
- August 3 – Day 1
- August 4 – Day 2
- August 5 – Day 3

2018 Artists

As listed on the official Tokyo Idol Festival website.

- =Love
- 9nine
- AKB48
- Band Ja Naimon!
- Bish
- Camellia Factory
- Cynhn
- Gang Parade
- HKT48
- Idol College
- Yū Serizawa

=== 2019 ===
==== Dates ====
- August 2 – Day 1
- August 3 – Day 2
- August 4 – Day 3

2019 Artists

As listed on the official Tokyo Idol Festival website.

- =Love
- AKB48
- Atarashii Gakko!
- Band Ja Naimon!
- Beyooooonds
- Bish
- Camellia Factory
- Gang Parade
- Idoling!!!
- Lily of the Valley
- LinQ
- Lyrical School
- Super Girls
- Yufu Terashima
- Yū Serizawa

=== 2020 ===
==== Dates ====
- October 2 – Day 1
- October 3 – Day 2
- October 4 – Day 3

2020 Artists

As listed on the official Tokyo Idol Festival website.

- AKB48
- Amefurasshi
- Crown Pop
- Cyberjapan Dancers
- Dialogue+
- Hinatazaka46
- Lily of the Valley
- LinQ
- Lyrical School
- Momoiro Clover Z
- Niji no Conquistador
- Ukka
- Yufu Terashima

=== 2021 ===
==== Dates ====
- October 1 – Day 1 – Canceled due to weather
- October 2 – Day 2
- October 3 – Day 3

2021 Artists

As listed on the official Tokyo Idol Festival website.

- ≠Me
- =Love
- AKB48
- Appare!
- ASP
- Asteria
- Beyooooonds
- Bis
- Crown Pop
- Cynhn
- Lily of the Valley
- LinQ
- Lyrical School
- Peel the Apple
- Sakurazaka46
- Ukka

=== 2022 ===
==== Dates ====
- August 5 – Day 1
- August 6 – Day 2
- August 7 – Day 3

2022 Artists

As listed on the official Tokyo Idol Festival website.

- AKB48
- Bis
- Fruits Zipper
- iSPY
- Juice=Juice
- LinQ
- Nogizaka46
- Onipan's!
- Super Girls
- Ukka

=== 2023 ===
==== Dates ====
- August 4 – Day 1
- August 5 – Day 2
- August 6 – Day 3

2023 Artists

As listed on the official Tokyo Idol Festival website.

- @onefive
- AKB48
- Bis
- Fruits Zipper
- iSPY
- Juice=Juice
- LinQ
- Super Girls
- Ukka

=== 2024 ===
==== Dates ====
- August 2 – Day 1
- August 3 – Day 2
- August 4 – Day 3

2024 Artists

As listed on the official Tokyo Idol Festival website.

- #2i2
- #Babababambi
- #Mooove!
- #Yoyoyo
- ≒Joy
- ≠Me
- =Love
- 22/7
- @onefive
- AKB48
- Amaimono Tsumeawase
- Ambitious
- Amefurasshi
- Ana Kie
- Ange Reve
- Anthurium
- Aoi Matsuyama
- Aozora wo Kimini
- Appare!
- Aqours
- ASP
- AVAM
- Axelight
- Ayaka Sasaki
- Band Ja Naimon!
- Bellring Shoujo Heart
- Beyooooonds
- Bis
- Bite a Shock
- Black Nazarene
- Boku ga Mitakatta Aozora
- Brave Mental Orchestra
- Camellia Factory
- C;ON
- Candy Tune
- Chu-Z
- ChuLa
- Cinderella Sengen!
- Colorful Scream
- Comiq On!
- Crown Pop
- Cutie Street
- Cyberjapan Dancers
- Cynhn
- Dempagumi.inc
- Devil Anthem.
- Dialogue+
- Dramatic Record
- Eisei to Karatea
- Enogu
- Eulopa Delic
- ExWhyZ
- Festive
- Finalist
- Fishbowl
- Fruits Zipper
- Fujikozu
- Future Cider
- Gachapin and Mukku
- Gang Parade
- Gilty x Gilty
- Gran Ciel
- Hello Pro Kenshuusei Unit '24
- Himawari
- Hinatazaka46
- HKT48
- Ichigo Milk Iro ni Somaritai
- Ideal Peco
- Idol College
- Iginari Tohoku San
- Inuwasi
- Jams Collection
- Jiemei
- Jya Pon
- Kannagi Rabbits
- Karen na Ivory
- Kasumisou to Stella
- Kingsari
- Kiss Kiss
- Kiyoshi Ryujin 25
- Kolokol
- Kyururin te Shitemite
- Kyushu Girls Wing
- Liella!
- LinQ
- Luce Twinkle Wink
- Lucky²
- Lyrical School
- Mameshiba no Taigun
- Maneki Kecak
- Marina Horiuchi
- Masshiro na Canvas
- Maybe Me
- Meme Tokyo
- Merry Bad Tune.
- Mirror, Mirror
- Momograci
- Momonyan
- Monoclone
- My Dear Darlin'
- My Fav
- NGT48
- NMB48
- Namidairono Keshigomu
- Namie Joshihatsu Kumiai
- Nanaland
- Nanimono
- Narlow
- Necopla pixx.
- Neo Japonism
- Nichoume no Sakigake Coming Out
- Niji no Conquistador
- Nippon Wachacha
- Nogizaka46
- Nonfic
- Ocha Norma
- One Love One Heart
- Onephony
- PPE41
- Palette Parade
- Payrin's
- Peel the Apple
- The Dance for Philosophy
- Piggs
- Qumali Depart
- Quubi
- Rad Sound Rebels
- Ranaqura
- Ringo Musume
- Ringwanderung
- Rough × Laugh
- SHHis
- SKE48
- STU48
- Saki Yamakita
- Sandal Telephone
- Satori Monster
- Schrödinger no Inu
- Seishun Gakuen
- Shanimuni Parade
- Shinshi Todoroku, Gekijou no Gotoku.
- Shiritsu Ebisu Chugaku
- Situasion
- Stainy
- Sukiiro drop
- Super Girls
- Super Venus
- Suteneko Cats
- Sweet Steady
- Taiyou to Odore Tsukiyo ni Utae
- Takane no Nadeshiko
- Task have Fun
- Team Shachi
- Teardrop!
- Tebasaki Sensation
- Tensen Tensei Shoujo.
- The Fujunbungaku Girl's Musical Revue
- The Orchestra Tokyo
- Title Mitei
- Tokyo Girls' Style
- Tsuka Rika
- Uma Musume Pretty Derby
- Unlame
- Up Up Girls (2)
- UtaGe!
- W. DoubleV
- Wasuta
- What's Circle
- White Scorpion
- Yakosei Amuse
- Yosugala
- Yum!-Tuk!
- i-COL
- iLiFE!
- Ukka

=== 2025 ===
==== Dates ====
- August 1 – Day 1
- August 2 – Day 2
- August 3 – Day 3

2025 Artists

As listed on the official Tokyo Idol Festival website.

- ≒Joy
- ≠Me
- =Love
- @onefive
- AKB48
- Amefurasshi
- Beyooooonds
- Camellia Factory
- Candy Tune
- Cutie Street
- Cynhn
- Devil Anthem.
- ExWhyZ
- Gang Parade
- HKT48
- Juice=Juice
- Yuki Kashiwagi
- Kiss Kiss
- LinQ
- NGT48
- NMB48
- Ocha Norma
- Yū Serizawa
- SKE48
- STU48
- Super Girls
- Sweet Steady
- Team Shachi
- The Dance for Philosophy
- Ukka

=== 2026 ===
==== Dates ====
- July 31 – Day 1
- August 1 – Day 2
- August 2 – Day 3

2026 Artists

As listed on the official Tokyo Idol Festival website.

- ≒Joy
- ≠Me
- =Love
- @onefive
- AKB48
- Candy Tune
- Chō Tokimeki Sendenbu
- Cutie Street
- Cynhn
- Devil Anthem.
- ExWhyZ
- Gang Parade
- HKT48
- Iris
- Issue
- Juice=Juice
- Kiss Kiss
- LinQ
- NGT48
- NMB48
- Ocha Norma
- Piggs
- SKE48
- STU48
- Super Girls
- Sweet Steady
