= Moeka =

- Gender: Female

Origin
- Origin: Japanese
- Meaning: Different meanings depending on the kanji used

Other names
- Alternative spelling: モエカ

Moeka (written: 萌花 or 萌華) is a feminine Japanese given name. Notable people with the name include:

- Moeka Fukuyama (福山 萌叶; born 2004), Japanese former member of the ≒Joy
- Moeka Haruhi (春日 萌花; born 1984), Japanese professional wrestler, gravure idol, voice actress and television and radio personality
- Moeka Kijima (木島 萌香; born 1999), Japanese competitor in synchronised swimming
- Moeka Koizumi (小泉 萌香; born 1996), Japanese actress
- Moeka Minami (南 萌華; born 1998), Japanese women's footballer
- Moeka Suzuki (鈴木 萌花; born 2002), Japanese member of the Amefurasshi
- Moeka Takakura (高倉 萌香; born 2001), Japanese former member of the NGT48
- Moeka Yada (矢田 萌華; born 2008), Japanese member of the Nogizaka46

== Fictional characters ==
- Moeka China (知名 もえか), a character in the anime series High School Fleet
- Moeka Kiryu (桐生 萌郁), a character in the visual novel Steins;Gate
