= Sashihara =

Sashihara (written: 指原) is a Japanese surname. Notable people with the surname include:

- Rino Sashihara (指原 莉乃) (born 1992), Japanese singer, producer, and actress
- Steve Sashihara (born 1957), American business consultant and author
