= Ukka =

Japanese idol girl group

- Also known as: Sakura Ebis
- Origin: Tokyo, Japan
- Genres: J-pop; pop
- Years active: 2015–2026
- Labels: Stardust Records 2015-2022; Teichiku Records 2022-
- Members: Sora Akane; Riju Murahoshi; Moa Serizawa; Rina Yuuki; Ruri Aoi; Yuu Miyazawa; Koharu Wakana
- Past members: Misato Sakurai; Mizuha; Ayame Kawase
- Website: https://ukka.tokyo/

ukka (うっか), formerly Sakura Ebis (桜エビ〜ず) is a Japanese girl idol group, formed by Stardust Promotion in August 2015.

The group was originally formed as a "little sister" group of Shiritsu Ebisu Chugaku.

On December 28, 2025, it was announced that the group will disband after a solo concert scheduled to be held at Kanadevia Hall in Tokyo on May 24, 2026.

== Members ==
Name	Birthdate	Color	Notes
Sora Akane (茜空)	March 13, 2003 (age 22)	Turquoise	Founding member
Riju Murahoshi (村星 りじゅ)	October 19, 2002 (age 23)	Blue	Founding member
Moa Serizawa (芹澤 もあ)	January 18, 2006 (age 19)	Yellow	Joined on January 17, 2016
Rina Yuuki (結城りな)	April 9, 2003 (age 22)	Red	Joined on September 25, 2021
Ruri Aoi (葵るり)	July 20, 2004 (age 21)	Lavender	Joined on September 25, 2021
Yuu Miyazawa (宮沢友)	February 26, 2009 (age 16)	Orange	Joined on November 24, 2023
Koharu Wakana (若菜こはる)	March 2, 2010 (age 15)	White	Joined on November 24, 2023

== Former members ==
Name	Birthdate	Notes
Misato Sakurai (桜井 美里)	April 18, 2003 (age 22)	Graduated on December 28, 2020
Mizuha (水春)	June 25, 1999 (age 26)	Former Leader; Left on March 18, 2021
Ayame Kawase (川瀬 あやめ)	October 25, 2001 (age 24)	Former Leader; Graduated on December 30, 2023

== History ==
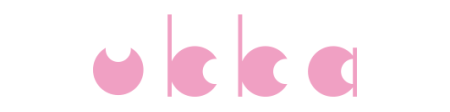
Logo

2015

On January they started recruiting members for a "little sister" group of Shiritsu Ebisu Chugaku

On May, Sakura Ebis was launched with 4 members: Mizuha, Misato, Riju and Ayame

On July, Sora was incorporated into the group as the 5th member

On August 1, they showed for the first time at TIF2015.

2016

On January 17, they held their first one-man live. Moa joins as the 6 member

On July 30, they released their 1st CD-R

On July 31, they performed at Girls Factory Day 2 (Ebichu's Day)

2017

On September 2, they released their 1st CD Single "Watashi Romance" in Yokohama Bay Hall

2018

On March 21, they released their 1st Album "Sakuraebis"

2019

On August 21, they released their 2nd Album "Octave"

On November 16, they announced that they would change their name to "ukka"

2020

On December 28, Misato Sakurai graduated from the group

2021

On March 18, it was announced that Mizuha had left the group

On July 28, they released their 1st EP "T.O.N.E"

On September 25, Rina Yuuki and Ruri Aoi joins as a result of the audition

2022

On May 5, They sign their major debut contract with Teichiku Records label

2023

On November 24, Yuu Miyazawa and Koharu Wakana joined the group

On December 30, Ayame Kawase graduated from the group

== Discography ==
=== Albums ===
No.	Title	Release date
1	Sakuraebis	March 21, 2018
2	Octave	August 21, 2019

=== EP's ===
No.	Title	Release date
1	T.O.N.E	July 28, 2021

=== Singles ===
No.	Title	Release date	MV
CD-R Singles
1	1st CD-R	July 30, 2016	
2	2nd CD-R	October 30, 2016	
3	3rd CD-R	April 15, 2017	
CD Singles
1	Watashi Romance	September 2, 2017	MV
2	Summer Magic	October 14, 2018	
3	Autumn Moon	December 28, 2018	
4	Winter Sleep	March 30, 2019	
5	Koi, Ichibanme	May 6, 2020	

=== Digital singles ===
No.	Title	Release date	MV
1	Lindberg	July 11, 2018	MV
2	Shakunetsu to Ice Cream	July 25, 2018	MV
3	Mawaru Mawaru Mawaru	September 5, 2018	
4	Magik Melody	September 30, 2018	
5	Onegaiyo	October 26, 2018	MV
6	Gra-gen	November 28, 2018	
7	Kirakira	December 17, 2018	MV
8	Kaerenai!	January 31, 2019	
9	214	February 27, 2019	MV
10	Sorewa Getsuyoubi no 9ji no Youni	March 29, 2019	
11	Nē, Loafer.	April 26, 2019	
12	Saisho no Saisho	May 31, 2019	

=== Collaboration singles ===
Order	Title	Release date	Notes
1	Mugen Kageki	March 26, 2017	With Iginari Tohoku San. Only for sale in events.
