= Kigurumi =

Masked costume cosplay

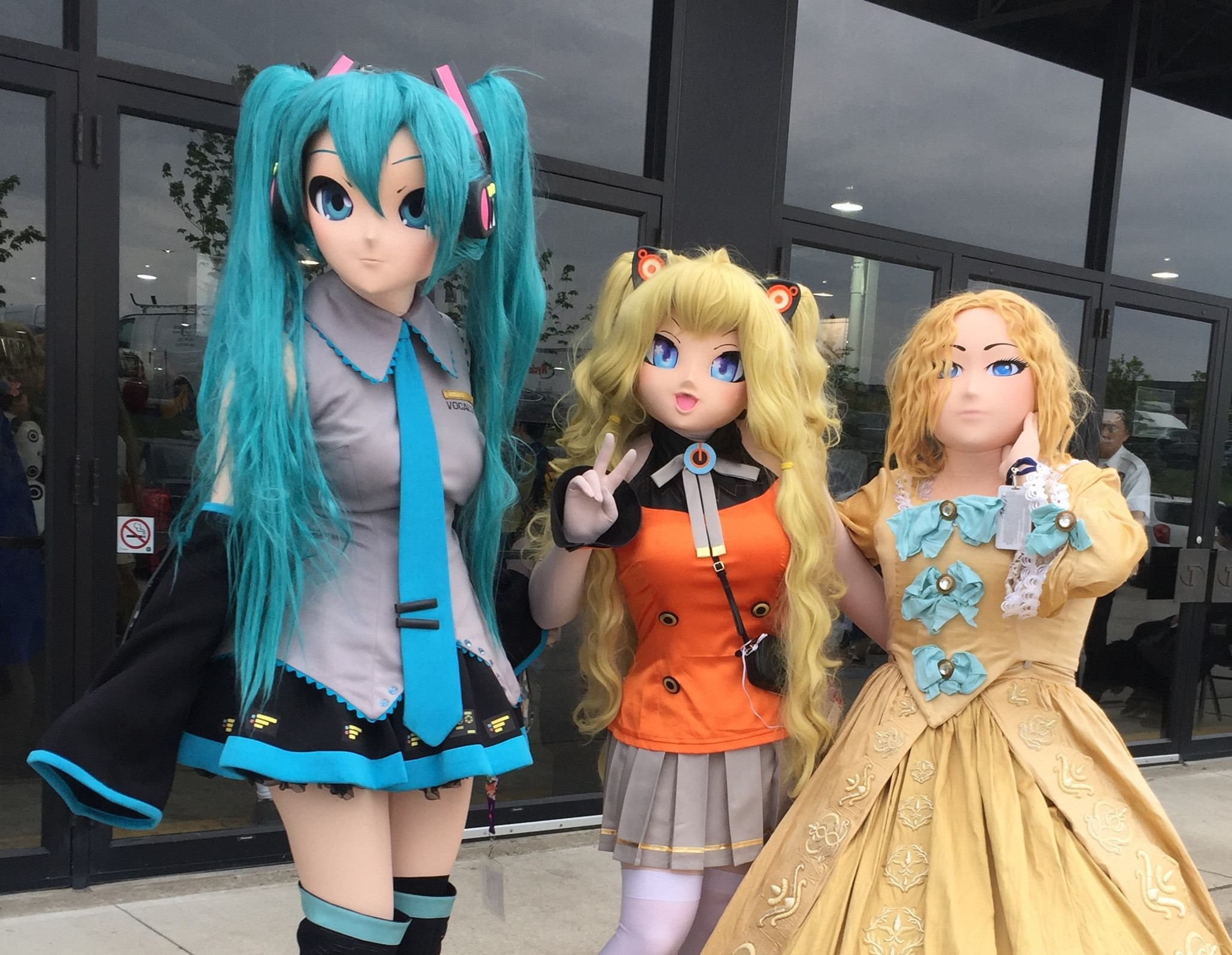
Kigurumi performers at Anime North 2017.

Kigurumi, also shortened as kig or kigu, is a type of masked cosplay that has its origins in the official stage shows of various Japanese anime but has also been adapted by hobbyists. The term animegao (アニメ顔, meaning 'anime face') has been used to differentiate the cosplay from the onesies sharing the same name. Doller had also been used when referring to kigurumi cosplayers, but today mainly refers to ball-jointed doll–styled masked cosplays. Although kigurumi remains a minor part of Japan's cosplay scene, it began attracting overseas attention in North America and Europe around 2005.

== Practice of kigurumi ==
As with other kinds of cosplay, many hobbyists have costumes of established characters from games or animations. The characters are usually female, and commonly human, although kigurumi characters of other species and genders do exist, including male (such as Kenshin Himura from Rurouni Kenshin), mechanical (such as Gundam Wing), elfin (such as Deedlit or Pirotess from Lodoss), and demonic (such as Inuyasha from the manga of the same name). Some kigurumi are original characters created by the performer. Wearing kigurumi is not restricted to one gender.

By wearing a bodysuit and mask, kigurumi cosplayers are able to closer resemble the characters with high accuracy, especially in the case of anime, anthro, or otherwise highly stylised characters. In kigurumi, the performers wear a plastic mask that was created by either molding or 3D printing and a matching flesh-coloured body suit (a zentai suit known as a hadatai where it often has an face opening); underneath the bodysuit, the performer wears breast forms, chest binders, hip padding, and similar implements to match the character's body shape. The body suit allows them less-detailed skin features, on the level of animated characters, and the mask allows a similar level of facial features.

Some hobbyists obtain masks from established hobbyist mask studios. As of 2018, there are six mask studios locations in Japan, as well as in Taiwan and the United States. Major production examples include a Japanese studio that takes orders for customized masks with wig and eye parts based on studio's original designs for over 130,000 yen (about US$1,182), and a Taiwanese studio that takes orders for fully customized masks for over 131,000 yen (about US$1,190). The average price of a mask produced by a mask studio is between 100,000 and 200,000 yen (about between US$910 and US$1,819).

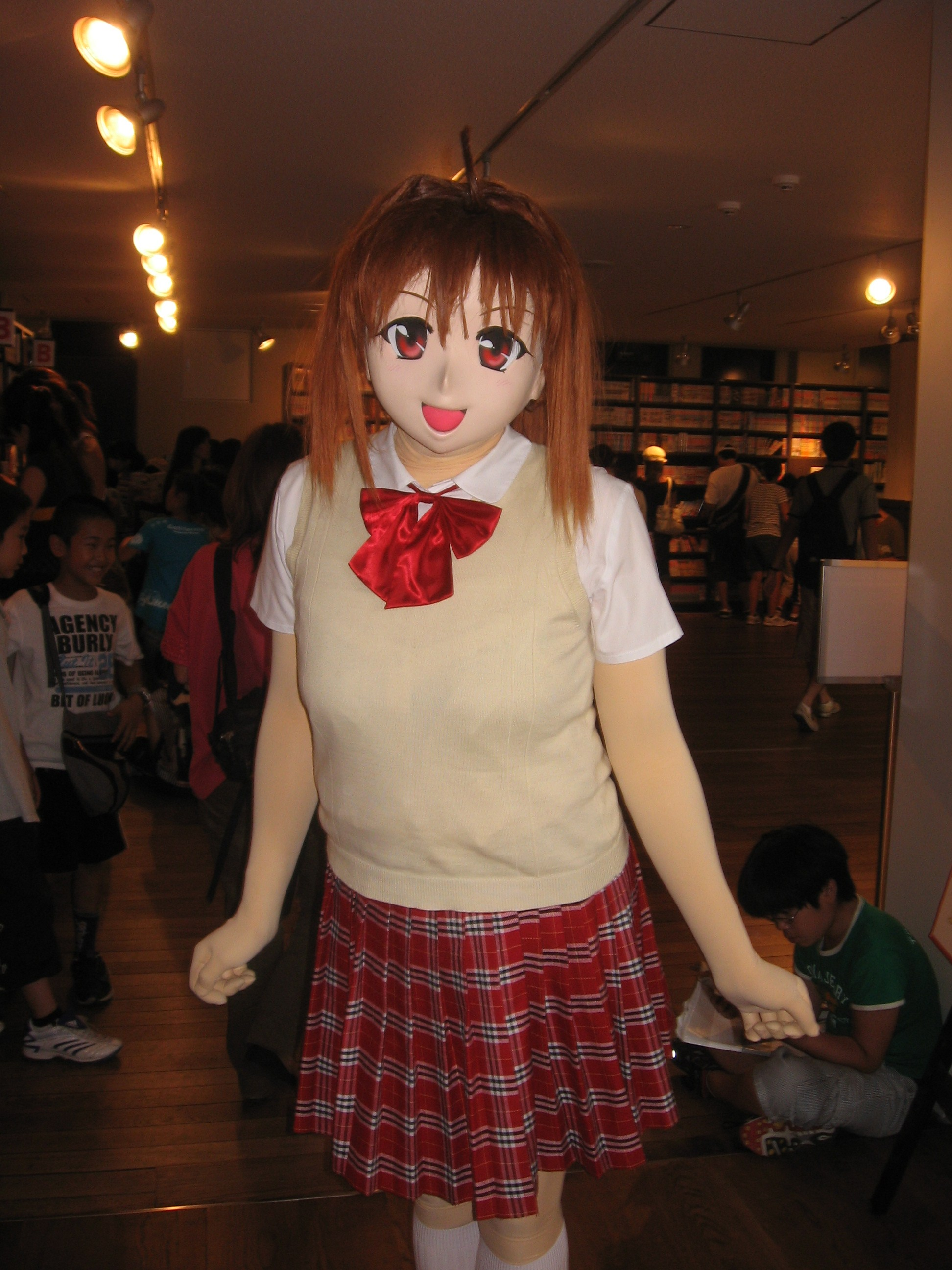
This kigurumi leaves no part of their skin exposed.

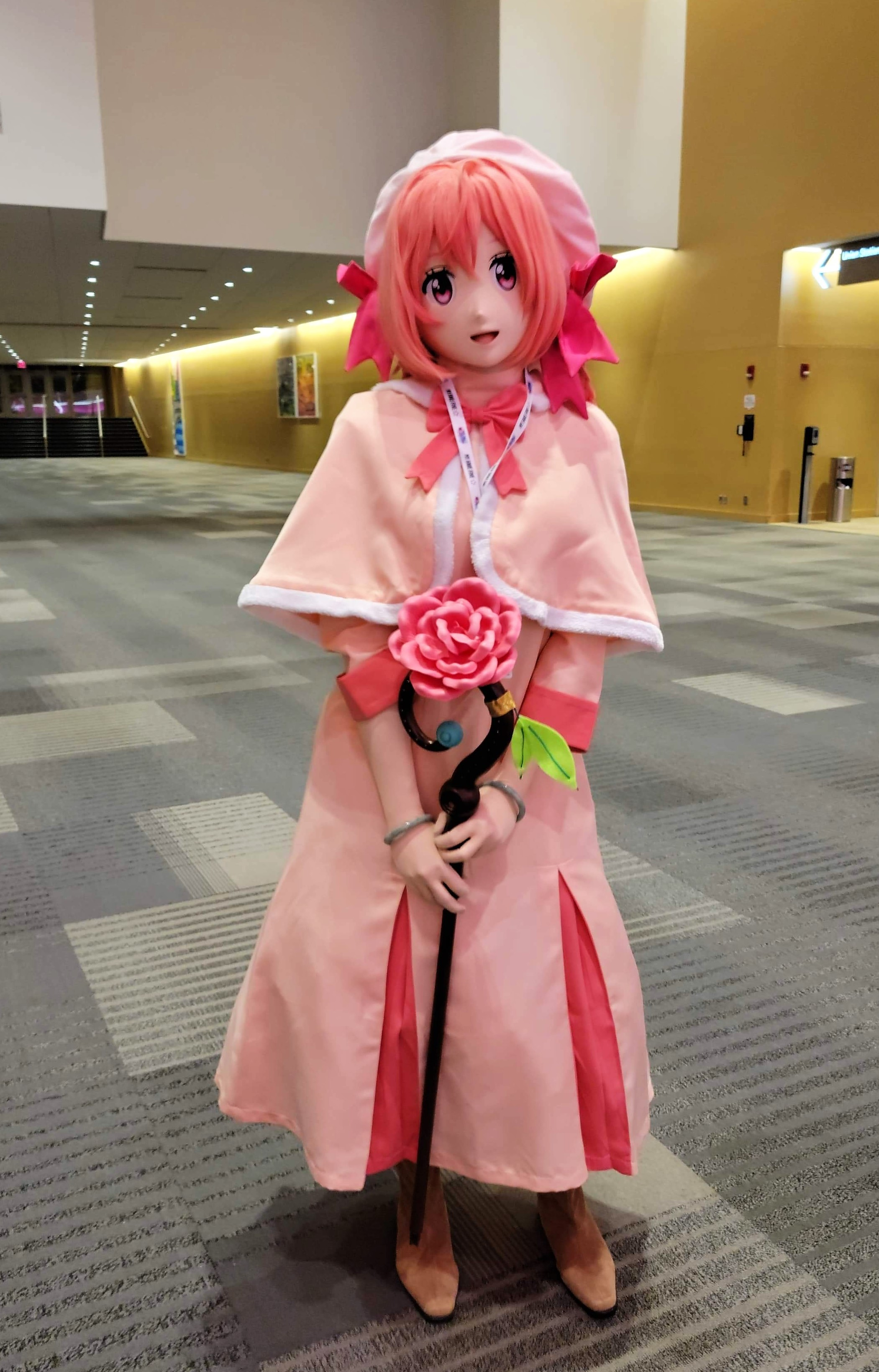
Kigurumi cosplay of Lily (Recovery of an MMO Junkie) at Matsuricon 2022

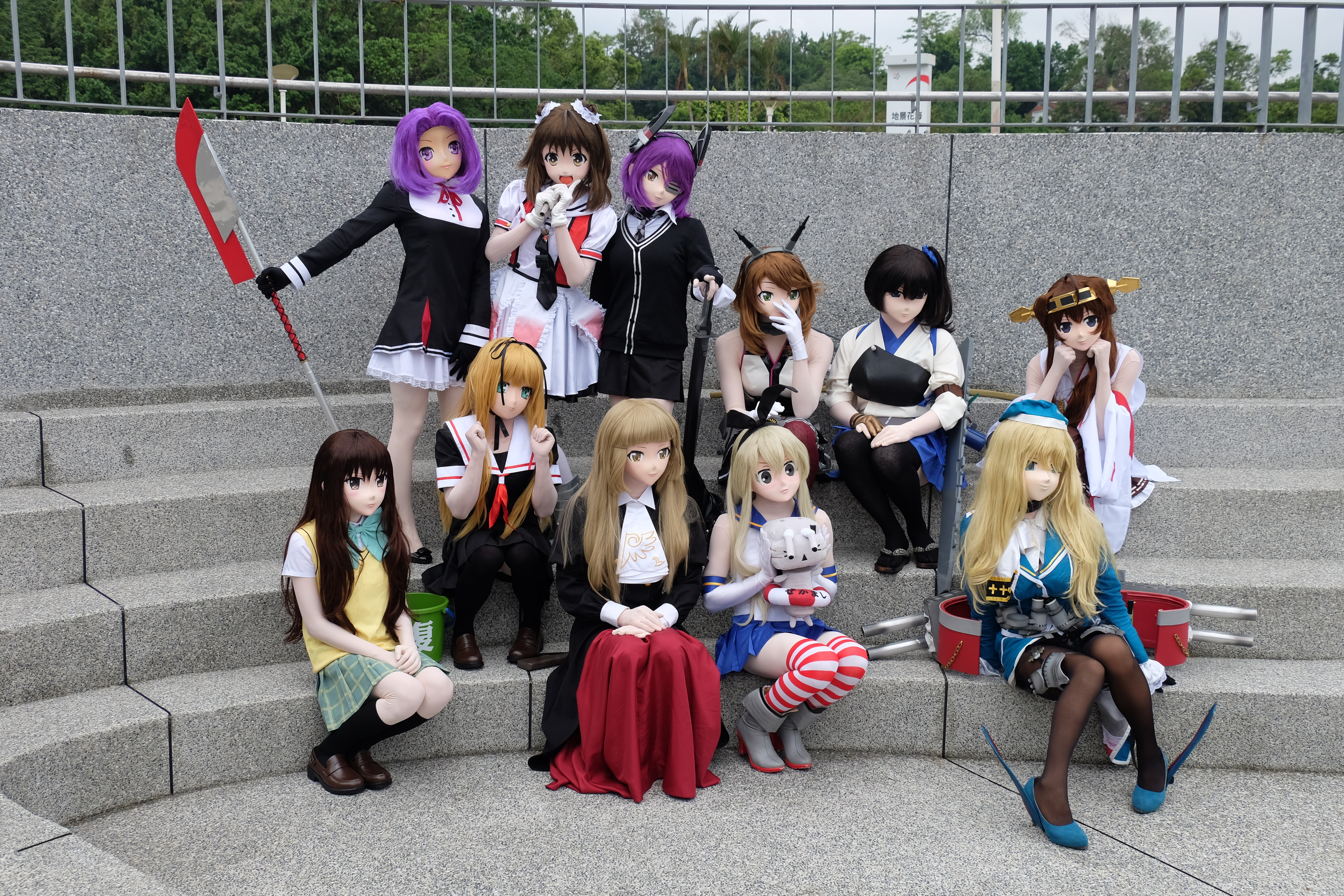
Kigurumi cosplays of Kantai Collection and To Love Ru characters at Fancy Frontier 26

== Media coverage ==
While kigurumi is largely used in stage shows and by hobbyists, it has extended into the acts of other performers. DJ Minami Momochi performs in such an outfit, American photographer Laurie Simmons featured them in a photo series, and Japanese fashion model Lulu Hashimoto incorporates them in her outfits. Kigurumi cafes have also operated in Japan, where waitresses are dressed in costume. Some kigurumi performers were also featured in an episode of the Netflix series Midnight Asia. Kigurumi was also featured in the Porter Robinson song "Cheerleader" for its music video and cover art.

== See also ==
- Kigurumi
- VTuber
