= Soredemo Suki Da yo =

Single by Rino Sashihara
- B-side: "Hatsukoi Hills"; "Ren'ai Sōsenkyo (Sashihara Rino solo ver.)" (Type-A); "Itoshiki Natasha" (Type-B); "Yeah! Meccha Holiday" (Type-C)
- Released: May 2, 2012 (Japan)
- Genre: J-pop
- Label: Avex Trax
- Songwriter(s): Yasushi Akimoto (lyrics); Tsunku (lyrics)
- Producer(s): Yasushi Akimoto

Rino Sashihara singles chronology
"Soredemo Suki Da yo" (2012)	"Ikujinashi Masquerade" (2012)

Music video
- Rino Sashihara "Soredemo suki Da yo" (Short ver.)(preview) on YouTube

"Soredemo Suki Da yo" (それでも好きだよ, "Nevertheless, I Love You") is the debut solo single by Rino Sashihara, released in Japan on May 2, 2012.

== Background ==
The single was released in four versions: Type-A, Type-B, Type-C, and Type-D.

"Soredemo Suki Da yo" was released on the same day with Nogizaka46's "Oide Shampoo". The 2 singles clashed in the charts. On the first day, Nogizaka46 sold 111,000 copies vs. Sashihara's 57,000 (rounded to the nearest thousand). On the second day, Rino Sashihara took the first spot and didn't let go of it for the rest of the week. Despite that, Sashihara lost; the first position in the weekly chart belonged to Nogizaka46, which sold 156,000 singles against the second place's 124,000.

== Track listing ==
=== Type-A ===
CD
No.	Title	Length
1.	"Soredemo Suki Da yo" (それでも好きだよ)
2.	"Hatsukoi Hills" (初恋ヒルズ Hatsukoi Hiruzu)
3.	"Ren'ai Sōsenkyo (Sashihara Rino solo ver.)" (恋愛総選挙〜指原莉乃 solo ver.〜)
4.	"Soredemo Suki Da yo (Instrumental)" (それでも好きだよ（off vocal ver.）)
5.	"Hatsukoi Hills (Instrumental)" (初恋ヒルズ（off vocal ver.）)
6.	"Ren'ai Sōsenkyo (Sashihara Rino solo ver.) (Instrumental)" (恋愛総選挙〜指原莉乃 solo ver.〜（off vocal ver.）)

DVD
No.	Title	Length
1.	"Soredemo Suki Da yo (Music Video)" (それでも好きだよ（Music Video）)
2.	"33nin no Sashihara Rino × Nakamura Taikō (Part I)" (33人の指原莉乃×中村太洸〜Part I〜)
3.	"Soredemo Suki Da yo -"Muse no Kagami" Tokubetsu Henshūban" (それでも好きだよ -「ミューズの鏡」特別編集版-)

=== Type-B ===
CD
No.	Title	Length
1.	"Soredemo Suki Da yo" (それでも好きだよ)
2.	"Hatsukoi Hills" (初恋ヒルズ Hatsukoi Hiruzu)
3.	"Itoshiki Natasha" (愛しきナターシャ)
4.	"Soredemo Suki Da yo (Instrumental)" (それでも好きだよ（off vocal ver.）)
5.	"Hatsukoi Hills (Instrumental)" (初恋ヒルズ（off vocal ver.）)
6.	"Itoshiki Natasha (Instrumental)" (愛しきナターシャ（off vocal ver.）)

DVD
No.	Title	Length
1.	"Soredemo Suki Da yo (Music Video)" (それでも好きだよ（Music Video）)
2.	"33nin no Sashihara Rino × Nakamura Taikō (Part II)" (33人の指原莉乃×中村太洸〜Part II〜)
3.	"Everyday, Katyusha / Momomane AKB" (Everyday、カチューシャ / ものまねAKB)

=== Type-C ===
CD
No.	Title	Length
1.	"Soredemo Suki Da yo" (それでも好きだよ)
2.	"Hatsukoi Hills" (初恋ヒルズ Hatsukoi Hiruzu)
3.	"Yeah! Meccha Holiday" (Yeah! めっちゃホリディ)
4.	"Soredemo Suki Da yo (Instrumental)" (それでも好きだよ（off vocal ver.）)
5.	"Hatsukoi Hills (Instrumental)" (初恋ヒルズ（off vocal ver.）)
6.	"Yeah! Meccha Holiday (Instrumental)" (Yeah! めっちゃホリディ（off vocal ver.）)

DVD
No.	Title	Length
1.	"Soredemo Suki Da yo (Music Video)" (それでも好きだよ（Music Video）)
2.	"33nin no Sashihara Rino × Nakamura Taikō (Part III)" (33人の指原莉乃×中村太洸〜Part III〜)
3.	"Sashihara Rino Honnin Kaisetsu ni Yoru Sashihara Rino 1st Solo Single "Soredemo Suki Da yo" Live Toki ni Okeru Utsukushī Mix Oyobi Call Kōza" (指原莉乃本人解説による 指原莉乃1stソロシングル「それでも好きだよ」ライブ時における美しいMIXおよびコール講座)

=== Type-D ===
Mu-mo shop limited edition.

CD
No.	Title	Length
1.	"Soredemo Suki Da yo" (それでも好きだよ)
2.	"Hatsukoi Hills" (初恋ヒルズ)
3.	"Ren'ai Sōsenkyo (Sashihara Rino solo ver.)" (恋愛総選挙〜指原莉乃 solo ver.〜)
4.	"Itoshiki Natasha" (愛しきナターシャ)
5.	"Yeah! Meccha Holiday" (Yeah! めっちゃホリディ)

== Charts ==
Chart (2012)	Peak position
Oricon Daily Singles Chart	1
Oricon Weekly Singles Chart	2
Oricon Monthly Singles Chart	5
Oricon Yearly Singles Chart	51
Billboard Japan Hot 100	1
Billboard Japan Hot Top Airplay	27
Billboard Japan Hot Singles Sales	1
Billboard Japan Adult Contemporary Airplay	18
