= =Love =

Japanese idol group

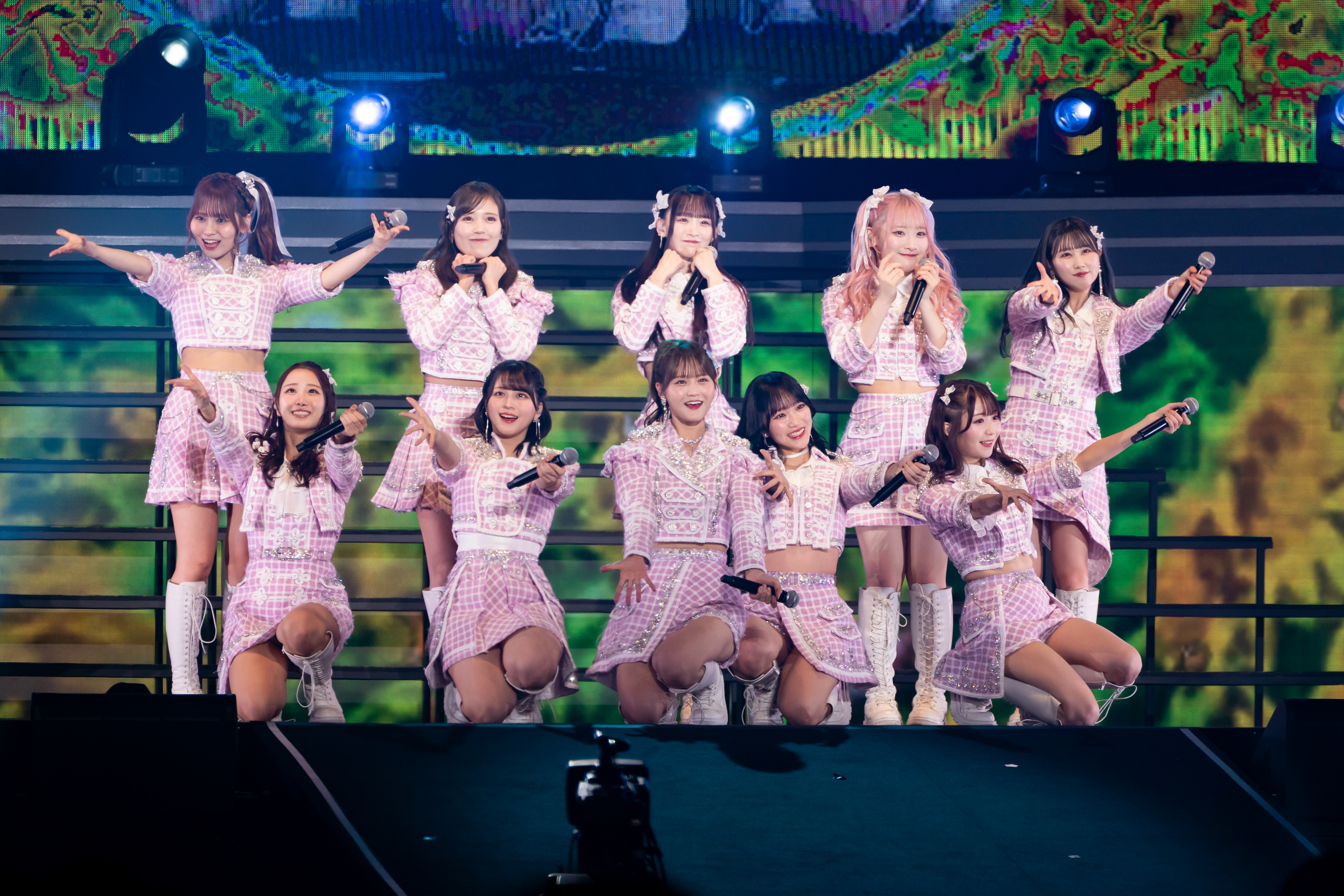
- =LOVE in April 2024

Background information
- Origin: Japan
- Genre: J-pop
- Years active: 2017–present
- Label: Sacra Music
- Members: Emiri Ōtani; Hana Ōba; Risa Otoshima; Kiara Saitō; Maika Sasaki; Hitomi Takamatsu; Shōko Takiwaki; Iori Noguchi; Sana Morohashi; Anna Yamamoto
- Past members: Nonno Satake; Nagisa Saitō
- Website: equal-love.jp

=Love (イコールラブ Ikōrurabu, pronounced "equal love", stylized as =LOVE) is a Japanese idol group composed of voice actors from the Yoyogi Animation Academy. The ten-person group is produced by former AKB48 and HKT48 member Rino Sashihara and is signed under Sacra Music. Its sister groups are ≠Me and ≒Joy.

== History ==
=== 2017 ===
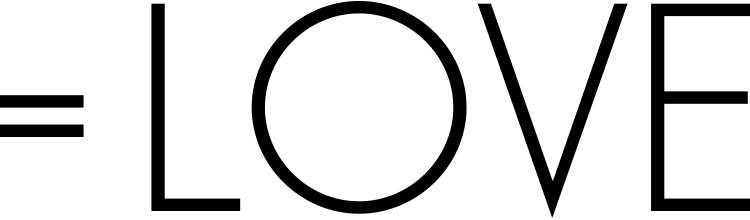
=Love logo

On 28 January 2017, Rino Sashihara announced during a press conference that she plans to creating an idol group with voice actors from Yoyogi Animation Academy with the goal of "surpassing Yasushi Akimoto", the creator of established idol groups such as AKB48 and Nogizaka46. Auditions for the group began two days later. On 29 April 2017, it was announced that thirteen people passed the auditions and the group would be named "=Love". One member, Mai Chōnan, dropped out after the announcement, bringing the final number of members to twelve.

The group's first live performance came at the 2017 Tokyo Idol Festival, a venue they would continue to visit for the next two years. During their performance, =Love debuted their upcoming self-titled single, "=Love". The single was released on 6 September 2017, where it reached 8th on the Oricon Singles Chart and 14th on the Billboard Japan Hot 100.

On 6 December 2017, they released their 2nd single, "Bokura no Seifuku Christmas".

=== 2018 ===
Between 15 and 18 February 2018, =Love appeared in their first stage play, a 2.5D musical based on the media franchise Kemono Friends. They also held their first overseas performances in Taiwan, first on 18 March at the Megaport Music Festival in Kaohsiung, then a solo live on 25 March at the Syntrend Creative Park in Taipei. They also performed at the Japan Expo in Paris on 6 July.

On 16 May, they released their third single, "Teokure Caution".

On 2 August, it was announced that member Maika Sasaki would be taking a break from group activities. Thus, she would not participate in the upcoming fourth single.

On 17 October, they released their fourth single, "Want you! Want you!".

On 9 December, Maika Sasaki resumed group activities after four months of hiatus.

=== 2019 ===
On 24 February 2019, Sashihara unveiled =Love's sister group, ≠Me (pronounced "not equal me", stylized as ≠ME). The sister group also has twelve members from Yoyogi Animation Academy and is produced by Sashihara. The two groups performed together at the 2019 Tokyo Idol Festival, where ≠Me unveiled their own self-titled debut single.

On 24 April 2019, they released their 5th single, "Sagase Diamond Lily".

On 19 August 2019, it was announced that the group's center, Hitomi Takamatsu would be on hiatus due to health issues and would not participate in the upcoming 6th single.

=== 2020 ===
On 15 April 2020, a special track, "Tsugi ni Aeta Toki Nani wo Hanasou Ka na", by =Love and ≠Me was released. This was Hitomi Takamatsu's first appearance since her hiatus.

They released their 7th single, "Cameo", on 29 April 2020 with members Emiri Ōtani and Nagisa Saito as double centers.

On 6 September during their "3rd Anniversary Premium Concert", where Hitomi Takamatsu officially resumes activities.

In November 2020, they released their 8th single, "Seishun Subliminal". This is Hitomi Takamats's first single after her hiatus and Nonno Satake's last.

=== 2021 ===
On 1 February 2021, it was announced that Nonno Satake will be graduating from the group. Her graduation concert was on 6 March.

The group's first album, Zenbu, Naisho., was released on 12 May 2021.

They released their 9th single, "Weekend Citron", on 25 August. They performed on Music Station for the first time on September 17.

They released their 10th single, "The 5th", on 15 December.

=== 2022 ===
On 29 March 2022, =Love's second sister group, ≒Joy (pronounced "nearly equal joy", stylized as ≒JOY), (Note: ≒ is used as an approximation sign in Japan, Taiwan, and South Korea.) was unveiled. As with ≠Me, this group initially had 12 members. However, former Last Idol member Ozawa Aimi was announced as the 13th member of the group on 28 June 2022.

They released their 11th single, "Ano ko Complex", on 25 May.

The group's 12th single, "Be Selfish", was released on 28 September 2022. The title track, "Be Selfish", was the group's first music video to have been made outside Japan, with filming and production being carried out by a Korean team based in South Korea.

On 25 September 2022, during their 5th anniversary performance, Nagisa Saitō announced her graduation from the group. Her graduation concert was held on 13 January 2023.

== Members ==
=== Current members ===
- Emiri Ōtani (大谷映美里)
- Hana Ōba (大場花菜)
- Risa Otoshima (音嶋莉沙)
- Kiara Saitō (齋藤樹愛羅)
- Maika Sasaki (佐々木舞香)
- Hitomi Takamatsu (髙松瞳)
- Shōko Takiwaki (瀧脇笙古)
- Iori Noguchi (野口衣織)
- Sana Morohashi (諸橋紗夏)
- Anna Yamamoto (山本杏奈)

=== Former members ===
- Nonno Satake (佐竹のん乃)
- Nagisa Saitō (齊藤なぎさ)

=== Timeline ===
- Blue (vertical) = Singles
- Red (vertical) = Albums

== Discography ==
=== Studio albums ===
Title	Album details	Peak chart positions	
Title	Album details	Oricon	Billboard
Zenbu, Naisho. (全部、内緒。)	Released: May 12, 2021; Label: Sacra Music; Formats: CD, digital download	1	1

=== Singles ===
Title	Year	Peak chart positions		Certifications	Album
Title	Year	Oricon	Billboard	Certifications	Album
"=Love"	2017	8	14		Zenbu, Naisho.
"Bokura no Seifuku Christmas" (僕らの制服クリスマス)	2017	3	4		Zenbu, Naisho.
"Teokure Caution" (手遅れcaution)	2018	3	3	RIAJ: Gold (phy.)	Zenbu, Naisho.
"Want You! Want You!"	2018	2	2	RIAJ: Gold (phy.)	Zenbu, Naisho.
"Sagase Diamond Lily" (探せ ダイヤモンドリリー)	2019	2	2	RIAJ: Gold (phy.)	Zenbu, Naisho.
"Zurui yo Zurui ne" (ズルいよ ズルいね)	2019	1	1	RIAJ: Gold (phy.)	Zenbu, Naisho.
"Cameo"	2020	2	3	RIAJ: Gold (phy.)	Zenbu, Naisho.
"Seishun 'Subliminal' " (青春"サブリミナル")	2020	1	5	RIAJ: Gold (phy.)	Zenbu, Naisho.
"Weekend Citron" (ウィークエンドシトロン)	2021	2	2	RIAJ: Gold (phy.)	Non-album singles
"The 5th"	2021	2	4	RIAJ: Gold (phy.)	Non-album singles
"Anoko Complex" (あの子コンプレックス)	2022	2	4	RIAJ: Platinum (phy.)	Non-album singles
"Be Selfish"	2022	1	2	RIAJ: Platinum (phy.)	Non-album singles
"Kono Sora ga Trigger" (この空がトリガー)	2023	2	4	RIAJ: Platinum (phy.)	Non-album singles
"Natsumatope" (ナツマトペ)	2023	1	5	RIAJ: Platinum (phy.)	Non-album singles
"Last Note Shika Shiranai" (ラストノートしか知らない)	2023	1	3	RIAJ: Platinum (phy.)	Non-album singles
"Norotte Norotte" (呪って呪って)	2024	2	6	RIAJ: Platinum (phy.)	Non-album singles
"Zettai Idol Yamenai de" (絶対アイドル辞めないで)	2024	2	3	RIAJ: Platinum (phy.); Gold (st.)	Non-album singles
"Tokube Chu, Shite" (とくべチュ、して)	2025	2	4	RIAJ: Platinum (phy.); Platinum (st.)	Non-album singles
"Koibito Ijō, Suki Miman" (恋人以上、好き未満)	2025	2	—	RIAJ: Platinum (phy.)	Non-album singles
"Love Song ni Osowareru" (ラブソングに襲われる)	2025	1	4	RIAJ: Platinum (phy.)	Non-album singles
"Gekiyaku Chūdoku" (劇薬中毒)	2026	1	1	RIAJ: 2× Platinum (phy.)	Non-album singles
"Koi, Hajimemashita" (恋、はじめました。)	2026	1	1	RIAJ: 2× Platinum (phy.)	Non-album singles
