= ≠Me =

Japanese idol girl group

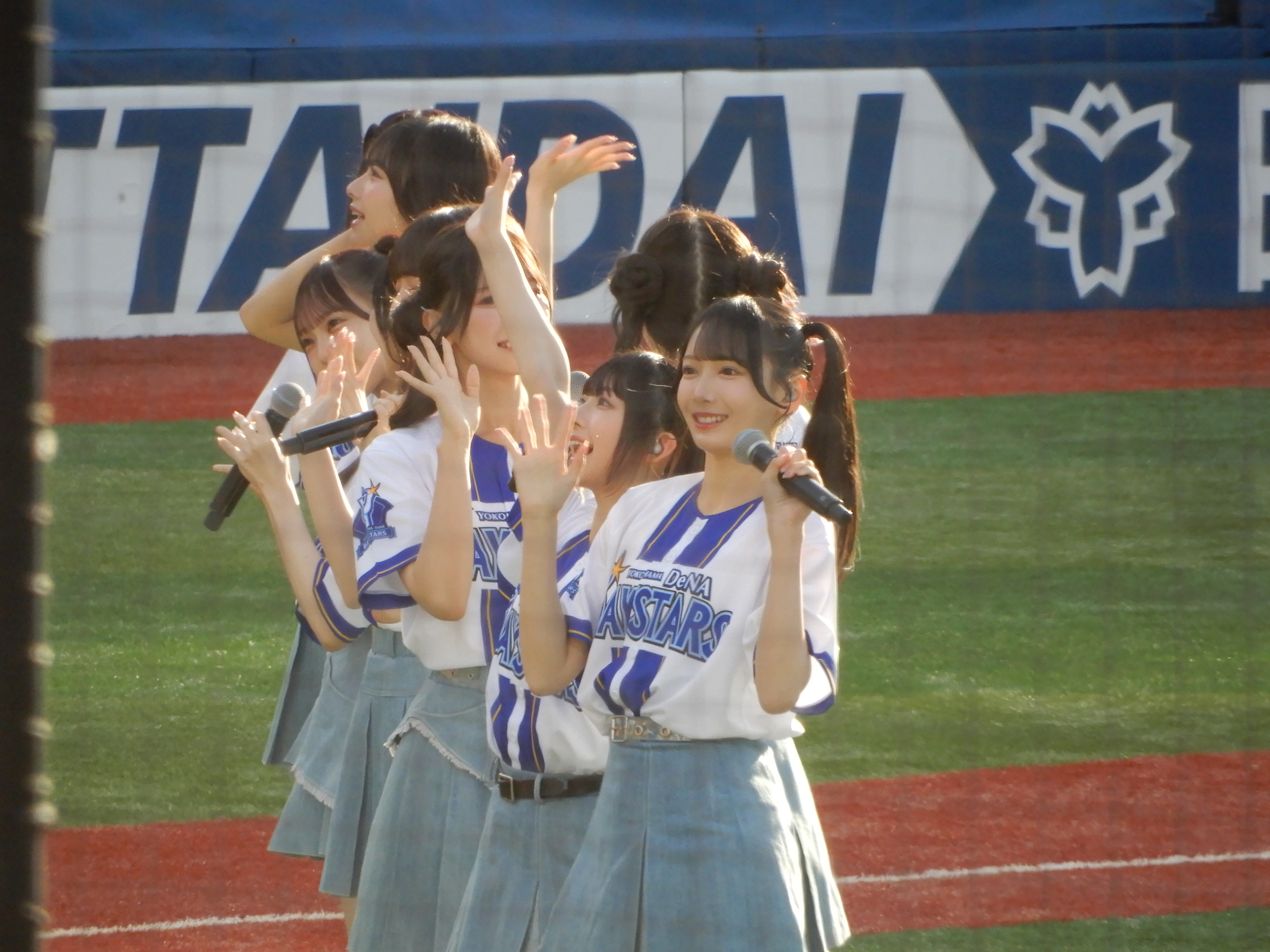
- ≠Me in 2026

Background information
- Origin: Japan
- Genre: J-pop
- Years active: 2019–present
- Label: King Records
- Members: Hana Ogi; Kirari Ochiai; Moeko Kanisawa; Natsune Kawaguchi; Natsumi Kawanago; Momo Sakurai; Hitomi Suzuki; Saya Tanizaki; Nanaka Tomita; Shiori Nagata; Miyuki Honda
- Past members: Mirei Suganami
- Website: not-equal-me.jp

≠Me (ノットイコールミー, Notto Ikōru Mī; pronounced "Not Equal Me", stylized as ≠ME), is a Japanese idol girl group that formed in early 2019. The twelve-person group is produced by former AKB48 and HKT48 member Rino Sashihara and is the first sister group of =Love, followed by ≒Joy.

== History ==
=== 2019–present: Formation and debut ===
≠Me logo

In late 2018, auditions for what would be =Love's sister group were held. On February 24, 2019, a line-up of eleven members was confirmed. The final member was revealed on April 8. They released their eponymous debut digital single on August 3. On August 4, the group performed alongside their sister group at Tokyo Idol Festival 2019. The group featured as the sole performer on =Love's sixth single B-side track "Kimi no Oto Datta nda" (君の音だったんだ) which was released on October 30. In October 2020, the group performed at Tokyo Idol Festival 2020. On April 7, 2021, they released their first EP, Chōtokkyū ≠Me Iki (超特急 ≠Me行き). On July 14, they released the single "Kimi wa Kono Natsu, Koi o Suru" (君はこの夏、恋をする). Their second single, "Mahoroba Asterisk" (まほろばアスタリスク), was released on November 10. The group's third single, "Chocolate Melancholy" (チョコレートメランコリー), was released on February 16, 2022, followed by their fourth single, "Su, Suki ja Nai!" (す、好きじゃない！), on August 3, and their fifth single, "Hanikami Short" (はにかみショート), on November 23. Their sixth single, "Tenshi wa Doko e" (天使は何処へ), was released on April 12, 2023

== Members ==
=== Current ===
- Hana Ogi (尾木波菜)
- Kirari Ochiai (落合希来里)
- Moeko Kanisawa (蟹沢萌子)
- Natsune Kawaguchi (河口夏音)
- Natsumi Kawanago (川中子奈月心)
- Momo Sakurai (櫻井もも)
- Hitomi Suzuki (鈴木瞳美)
- Saya Tanizaki (谷崎早耶)
- Nanaka Tomita (冨田菜々風)
- Shiori Nagata (永田詩央里)
- Miyuki Honda (本田珠由記)

=== Former ===
- Mirei Suganami (菅波美玲)

== Discography ==
=== Studio albums ===
Title	Album details	Peak chart positions	
Title	Album details	JPN	JPN Hot
Springtime in You	Released: March 20, 2024; Label: King; Formats: CD, digital download	1	2

=== Extended plays ===
Title	EP details	Peak chart positions	
Title	EP details	JPN	JPN Hot
Chōtokkyū ≠Me Iki (超特急 ≠Me行き)	Released: April 7, 2021; Label: King; Formats: CD, digital download	1	1

=== Singles ===
Title	Year	Peak chart positions		Sales	Certifications	Album
Title	Year	JPN	JPN Hot	Sales	Certifications	Album
"Kimi wa Kono Natsu, Koi o Suru" (君はこの夏、恋をする)	2021	2	15			Springtime in You
"Mahoroba Asterisk" (まほろばアスタリスク)	2021	2	8			Springtime in You
"Chocolate Melancholy" (チョコレートメランコリー)	2022	1	4		RIAJ: Gold	Springtime in You
"Su, Suki ja Nai!" (す、好きじゃない!)	2022	2	6		RIAJ: Gold	Springtime in You
"Hanikami Short" (はにかみショート)	2022	2	4		RIAJ: Gold	Springtime in You
"Tenshi wa Doko e" (天使は何処へ)	2023	2	6		RIAJ: Gold	Springtime in You
"Omowase Burikko" (想わせぶりっこ)	2023	3	5	JPN: 193,995 (phy.)	RIAJ: Platinum	Springtime in You
"Anti Confiture" (アンチコンフィチュール)	2023	1	4	JPN: 199,667 (phy.)	RIAJ: Platinum	Springtime in You
"Natsu ga Kita Kara" (夏が来たから)	2024	3	4	JPN: 190,017 (phy.)	RIAJ: Platinum	Non-album singles
"Mob-no-derella" (モブノデレラ)	2025	1	4	JPN: 182,486 (phy.)	RIAJ: Platinum	Non-album singles
"Kamisama no Iu Tōri!" (神様の言うとーり!)	2025	1	—	JPN: 182,486 (phy.)	RIAJ: Platinum	Non-album singles
"Haitateki Fighter" (排他的ファイター)	2025	1	3	JPN: 303,458 (phy.)	RIAJ: Platinum	Non-album singles
"Ai Kudasaimase" (愛くださいませ)	2026	1	1	JPN: 310,023 (phy.)	RIAJ: Platinum	Non-album singles
"Koko de First Kiss" (ここでファーストキッス)	2026	1	—	JPN: 310,023 (phy.)	RIAJ: Platinum	Non-album singles
