= Lyrical School =

Japanese female hip hop idol group

- Also known as: Tengal6 (2010–2012)
- Origin: Japan
- Genres: Hip hop, J-pop
- Years active: 2010–present
- Labels: ReleaseRush / File Records (2010–2012); BootRock / T-Palette Records (2012–2015); King Records (2016); BootRock (2017–2019); Victor Entertainment (2019–present)
- Members: Minan; Sayo; Tmrw; Hana; Mana; Malik; Ryuya; Reina
- Past members: mariko erika hina yumi ayaka mei ami hime hinako risano yuu
- Website: lyricalschool.com

Lyrical School (stylized as lyrical school) is a Japanese hip hop idol group.

The group was founded in October 2010 under the name Tengal6 (stylized as tengal6, pronounced tengyaru shikksu). On August 1, 2012, it was renamed Lyrical School.

== Members ==
- Minan (本多未南, Minan Honda; born on December 5, 1990) – joined on July 27, 2013
- Sayo - Joined on February 12, 2023
- Tmrw - Joined on February 12, 2023
- Hana - Joined on February 12, 2023
- Mana - Joined on February 12, 2023
- Malik - Joined on February 12, 2023
- Ryuya - Joined on February 12, 2023
- Reina - Joined on February 12, 2023

=== Former members ===
- Mariko (工藤まり仔, Mariko Kudō; born on July 19, 1988) – graduated on January 26, 2013
- Erika (知名えりか, Erika China; born on January 11, 1988) – first generation leader, graduated on June 30, 2013
- Hina (小松ひな, Hina Komatsu; born on June 5, 1996) – join on March 17, 2013; graduated on December 13, 2015
- Yumi (清水裕美, Hiromi Shimizu; born on September 19, 1990) – left in September 2016
- Ayaka (大部彩夏, Ayaka Ōbu; born on August 31, 1990) – second generation leader; graduated on February 26, 2017
- Mei (芽依, Mei; born on April 19, 1991) – graduated on February 26, 2017
- Ami (細越麻未, Asami Hosogoe; born on July 5, 1991) – graduated on February 26, 2017
- Hime (持田妃華, Himeka Mochida; born on May 14, 1998) – joined in December 2015 – graduated on July 24, 2022
- Hinako – joined on April 18, 2017 – graduated on July 24, 2022
- Risano – joined on April 18, 2017 – graduated on July 24, 2022
- Yuu – joined on April 18, 2017 – graduated on July 24, 2022

== Discography ==
=== Singles ===
| Title | Release date | Oricon Weekly Single Chart | Notes |
Tengal6
| "Up Your Hands!" (プチャヘンザ！, "Put Your Hand Up!") | October 28, 2011 | 144 | music video |
Lyrical School
| "Sorya Natsu Da! / Oide yo" (そりゃ夏だ！／おいでよ) | August 22, 2012 | 70 | music video |
| "Ribbon o Kyutto" (リボンをきゅっと) | December 12, 2012 | 48 | music video |
| "Parade" (PARADE) | May 15, 2013 | 34 | music video |
| "Waratte.net / My Kawaii Nichijō Ōtachi" (わらって．ｎｅｔ／Ｍｙかわいい日常たち) | December 11, 2013 | 40 | music video |
| "Brand New Day" (brand new day) | April 2, 2014 | 13 | music video |
| "Fresh!!!" (FRESH!!!) | July 5, 2014 | 21 | music video |
| "Pride" (PRIDE) | October 28, 2014 | 9 | music video |
| "Wonder Ground" (ワンダーグラウンド) | July 21, 2015 | 21 | music video |
| "Run and Run" (RUN and RUN) | April 27, 2016 | 16 | music video |
| "Summer Foundation" (サマーファンデーション) | July 6, 2016 | 30 | music video |
| "Magic Hour / Kakko Warui Furare Kata -LyriSchool no Baai-" (マジックアワー/格好悪いふられ方 - リリスクの場合 -) | October 5, 2016 | 32 | music video |
| "Natsuyasumi no Baby" (夏休みのBABY) | July 18, 2017 | 14 | music video |
| "Tsuretette yo / Call Me Tight" (つれてってよ/CALL ME TIGHT) | December 19, 2017 | | music video |

=== EPs / mini albums ===
| Title | Release date | Oricon Weekly Album Chart | Notes |
Tengal6
| Limited E.P. | June 15, 2011 | — | limited distribution (concert venues only) |
| Machigau (まちがう) | July 15, 2011 | — | "Photograph" music video |
Lyrical School
| New World E.P. | July 19, 2023 | 26 | |
| Life Goes On E.P. | July 26, 2025 | 25 | |

=== Albums ===
| Title | Release date | Oricon Weekly Album Chart | Notes |
Tengal6
| City | May 25, 2012 | 173 | "Shiteru/Shiranai" music video |
Lyrical School
| Date Course | September 18, 2013 | 42 | "Hitoribotchi no Labyrinth" music video |
| Spot | March 10, 2015 | 24 | "I.D.O.L.R.A.P." music video |
| Guidebook | November 16, 2016 | 75 | "guidebook" album trailer |
| World's End | June 19, 2018 | 10 | |
| Be Kind Rewind | September 11, 2019 | 12 | |
| Wonderland | April 7, 2021 | 16 | |
| L.S. | April 20, 2022 | 14 | |
