= Crown Pop =

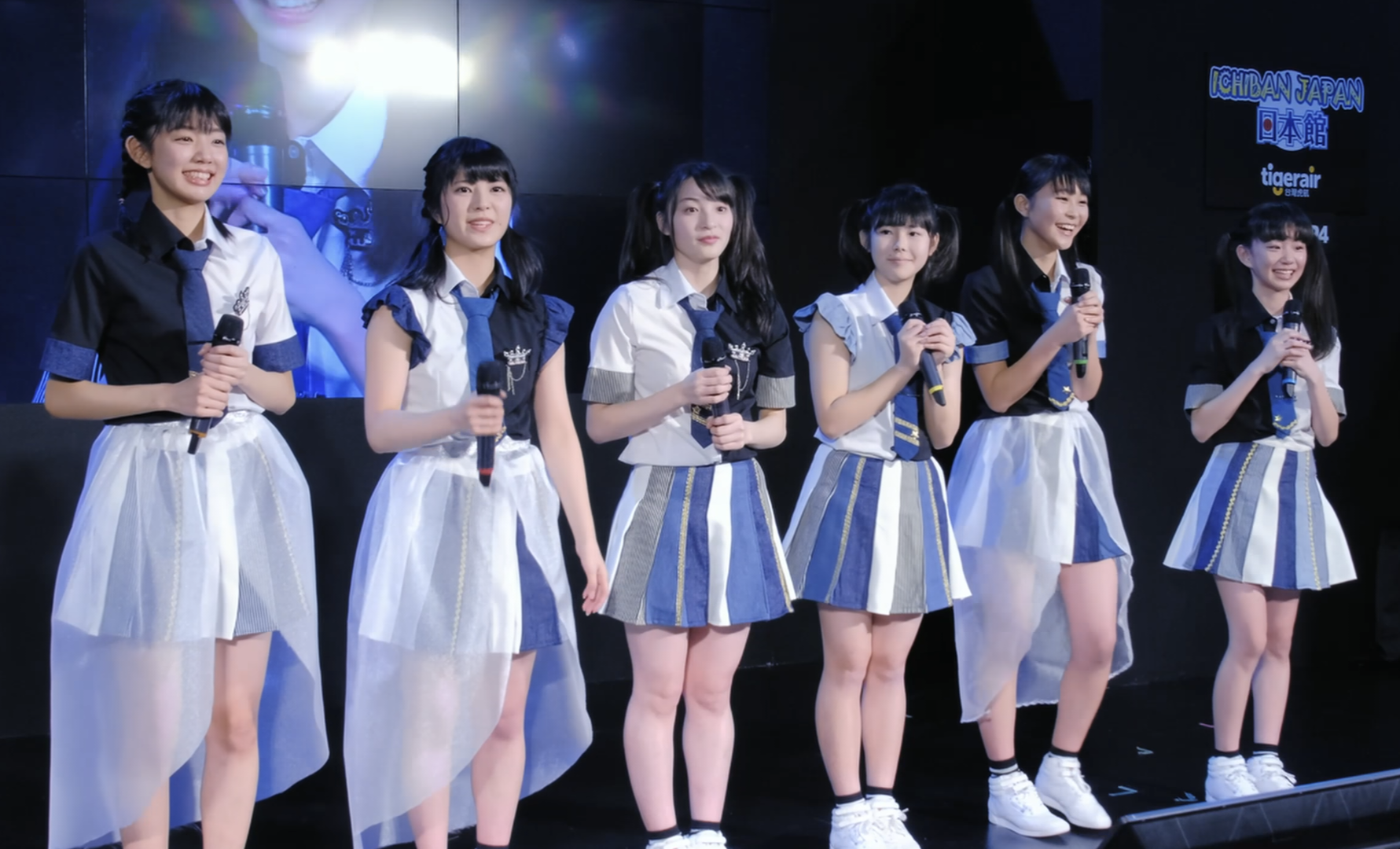
- Crown Pop in 2018

Background information
- Origin: Japan
- Genres: J-pop
- Years active: 2015–2024
- Label: Music@Note
- Website: crownpop.com

Crown Pop (stylized as CROWN POP) is a Japanese girl idol group belonging to Section 2 of the talent agency Stardust Promotion. As of late 2018, it is formed of five members: Mita Ibuki, Saho Tanaka, Rina, Airi Fujita, and Mia Yuzuki.

The band's nickname is Kurapo. The nickname for its fans is "Poppers".

On March 6, it was announced that they will disband after their last live at Zepp Shinjuku on August 8, 2024.

== History ==
The group was created on August 8, 2015, consisting of several junior high and high school girls who were noted at Stardust Planet (Note: A department of Stardust Promotion that specializes in female idols) for their dance skills. The group's name originates from its concept of "working hard to polish dance skills in order to grab the entertainment world's crown".

The group was originally founded without a name and was known simply as "Entertainment Office Section 2 Lesson Place" (芸能２部レッスン場). The name "Crown Pop" was announced during their live debut performance that took place on December 5, 2015 at the "Please Don't Forget Tohoku" event in Sendai.

In September 2017, the group announced its first mini-album, Change the World!. The album was sold only at the group's live concerts.

After several member changes, the group settled with six members in January 2018: Mita Ibuki, Saho Tanaka, Kaori Yamamoto, Rina, Airi Fujita, and Mia Yuzuki. The first concert with the current line-up of six members was held on January 28, 2018 at Akihabara Zest and was titled Crown Pop New Line-up Announcement Concert (CROWN POP新体制お披露目公演).

On May 27, 2018, the group announced its first single, "Real×live", with a song titled "EGO×search" as a coupling track. This, like Change the World!, was only distributed at live concerts.

On October 23, 2018, the group released (through Music@Note, a record label created as a collaboration between Tower Records Japan and a pop culture event called @Jam) its first nationally distributed single, "Gogo Yoji goro no Suki Desu" (午後四時ごろの好きです). The single reached number 19 on the Japanese weekly Oricon singles chart.

On September 14, 2020, Kaori Yamamoto announced that she will graduate on September 27 at the band's "Solo Birthday" live.

On August 8, 2024, the group disband after their last live at Zepp Shinjuku.

== Musical and lyrical style ==
"Gogo Yoji goro no Suki Desu", the title track of the group's album Change the World!, is a sour-sweet rock song full of teenage racing heartbeats and vacillating emotions.

== Members ==
Name	Birthdate	Birthplace	Notes
Mita Ibuki(三田美吹)	July 19, 2000 (age 25)	Chiba Prefecture	Leader
Saho Tanaka(田中咲帆)	January 9, 2003 (age 23)	Kanagawa Prefecture	
Rina (里菜)	June 18, 2000 (age 25)	Tokyo	Oldest member
Airi Fujita(藤田愛理)	May 24, 2002 (age 23)	Kanagawa Prefecture	
Mia Yuzuki(雪月心愛)	December 27, 2004 (age 21)	Saitama Prefecture	Youngest member

== Former Members ==
Name	Birthdate	Birthplace	Notes
Kaori Yamamoto (山本花織)	November 7, 2000 (age 25)	Chiba Prefecture	Graduated on September 27, 2020

Interviews with the members

== Discography ==
=== EPs ===
Title	Album details
Change the World! (stylized as Change the world!)	Live-venue-only distribution; Released: September 2017

=== Albums ===
Title	Release date	Charts (Oricon weekly ranking)
LIFE	August 2020	9th (3,328)

=== Singles ===
Year	Title	Charts
Year	Title	JPN Oricon
2018	"Real×live" (live-venue-only distribution)	—
2018	"Gogo Yoji goro no Suki Desu" (午後四時ごろの好きです)	19
2019	"Samātaimurūru" (サマータイムルール)	16
2020	"Masshiro kataomoi" (真っ白片思い)	23
2020	"To Do" (シングル)	23
