= Devil Anthem. =

Japanese idol girl group

- Origin: Japan
- Genre: J-pop
- Years active: 2014–present
- Label: Asia Promotion
- Members: Kurumi Takekoshi; Yume Hashimoto; Kaede Ando; Akira Mizuno; Meisa Shiozaki; Nene Yabuki
- Past members: Lim; Ririka; Nanoha; Satsuki; Ai; Hiyori Fujisawa; Airi Takemoto
- Website: devilanthem.net

Devil Anthem. (デビルアンセム) is a Japanese idol girl group that formed in 2014.

== History ==
=== 2014–2015: Formation and debut ===
Devil Anthem. was formed on December 28, 2014. The initial line-up consisted of five members: Kurumi, Satsuki, Lim, Nanoha, and Ririka.

In April 2015, Lim graduated from the group was replaced by Ai. On August 4, they released their debut single, "Devil Anthem. Kimi no Heart wo Seifuku Chu". Their second single, "Kakusei Wow Wow", was released on December 15.

=== 2016–2022: Line-up changes ===
In June 2016, Ririka graduated from the group, then in July, Yume and Kaede joined the group. On August 2, they released their third single, "Last to Go!!"

They released their debut album, Fever, on April 18, 2017. Nanoha graduated from the group in July. In August, Airi joined the group. Their fourth single, "Emotional", was released on October 24. Satsuki graduated from the group in December.

On May 23, 2018, their fifth single, "Like a Nettaiya", was released. In October, Ai graduated from the group and new member Akira joined. Their sixth single, "Etto ne Remishī", was released on November 21.

They released their second album, Fake Factor, on March 27, 2019. Their seventh single, "Days", was released on September 18.

On September 9, 2020, their eighth single, "VS", was released, followed by their ninth single, "Up", on November 25.

Their first EP, SS, was released on March 3, 2021. In April, Hiyori joined the group. They released their third album, Right Now, on October 19.

Their tenth single, Reflect Winter, was released on February 15, 2022, followed by their eleventh single, "Fantastic90", on July 26. Hiyori graduated from the group in September.

=== 2023–2024: Major label debut and line-up changes ===
On February 14, 2023, they released their fourth album, Advance. They made their major label debut through Victor Entertainment with the single "Ar" on May 31. Their second major single, "God Bless You!!", was released on October 10.

Their first major album, Blue Youth, was released on February 4, 2024. On October 23, they released the compilation album, Devil Anthem. 10th Anniversary Collection/The Best Miraculous Trajectory. They went on hiatus after their final concert on December 27. Airi graduated from the group in February 2025. On March 23, the group resumed activities with the addition of Meisa Shiozaki and Nene Yabuki as new members.

== Members ==
=== Current ===
- Kurumi Takekoshi (竹越くるみ)
- Yume Hashimoto (橋本侑芽)
- Kaede Ando (安藤楓)
- Akira Mizuno (水野瞳)
- Meisa Shiozaki (塩崎めいさ)
- Nene Yabuki (矢吹寧々)

=== Former ===
- Lim
- Ririka
- Nanoha
- Satsuki
- Ai
- Hiyori Fujisawa (藤澤ひより)
- Airi Takemoto (竹本あいり)

== Discography ==
=== Studio albums ===
List of studio albums, with selected details and chart positions
Title	Details	Peak chart positions
Title	Details	JPN
Fever	Released: April 18, 2017; Label: Youthsource Records; Formats: CD, digital download, streaming	—
Fake Factor	Released: March 27, 2019; Label: Kanameishi Records; Formats: CD, digital download, streaming	41
Right Now (らいなう)	Released: October 19, 2021; Label: Music@Note; Formats: CD, digital download, streaming	13
Advance	Released: February 14, 2023; Label: Music@Note; Formats: CD, digital download, streaming	31
Blue Youth	Released: February 7, 2024; Label: Victor Entertainment; Formats: CD, digital download, streaming	15
A Story Beyond	Released: October 22, 2025; Label: Victor Entertainment; Formats: CD, digital download, streaming	50
Mirai Iro (未来色)	Released: October 21, 2026; Label: Victor Entertainment; Formats: CD, digital download, streaming	30

=== Compilation albums ===
List of compilation albums, with selected details and chart positions
Title	Details	Peak chart positions
Title	Details	JPN
Devil Anthem. 10th Anniversary Collection/The Best Miraculous Trajectory	Released: October 23, 2024; Label: Victor Entertainment; Formats: CD, digital download, streaming	16

=== Extended plays ===
List of EPs, with selected details and chart positions
Title	Details	Peak chart positions
Title	Details	JPN
Hang Out with Sound	Released: March 18, 2020; Label: Kanameishi Records; Formats: CD, digital download, streaming	—
SS	Released: March 3, 2021; Label: Music@Note; Formats: CD, digital download, streaming	41

=== Singles ===
List of singles, with selected chart positions, showing year released and album name
Title	Year	Peak chart positions	Album
Title	Year	JPN	Album
"Devil Anthem. ~Kimi no Heart wo Seifuku Chu~" (Devil Anthem.～キミのハートを征服中～)	2015	—	Fever and Right Now
"Kakusei Wow Wow" (覚醒 Wow Wow)	2015	—	Fever
"Last to Go!!" (らすとご!!)	2016	—	Fever and Right Now
"Emotional"	2017	50	Fake Factor and Right Now
"Like a Nettaiya" (Like a 熱帯夜)	2018	44	Fake Factor
"Alright"	2018	—	Non-album single
"Etto ne Remishī" (えっとねれみしー)	2018	46	Fake Factor
"Days"	2019	30	Non-album single
"Sora Seed" (ソラシド)	2020	—	SS
"VS"	2020	26	SS
"Up"	2020	37	SS and Right Now
"Reflect Winter"	2022	12	Advance
"Fantastic90"	2022	22	Advance
"Love Goku" (Love～極～)	2022	—	Advance
"Ar"	2023	14	Blue Youth
"God Bless You!!"	2023	9	Blue Youth
"Choma!" (ちょまっ！)	2024	—	Non-album singles
"Letter" (手紙)	2025	—	Non-album singles
"Rebuild"	2025	—	Non-album singles
"DCB"	2025	—	Non-album singles
"—" denotes a recording that did not chart or was not released in that territory.
