= Band Ja Naimon! =

Japanese girl group

Band Ja Naimon! MAXX NAKAYOSHI
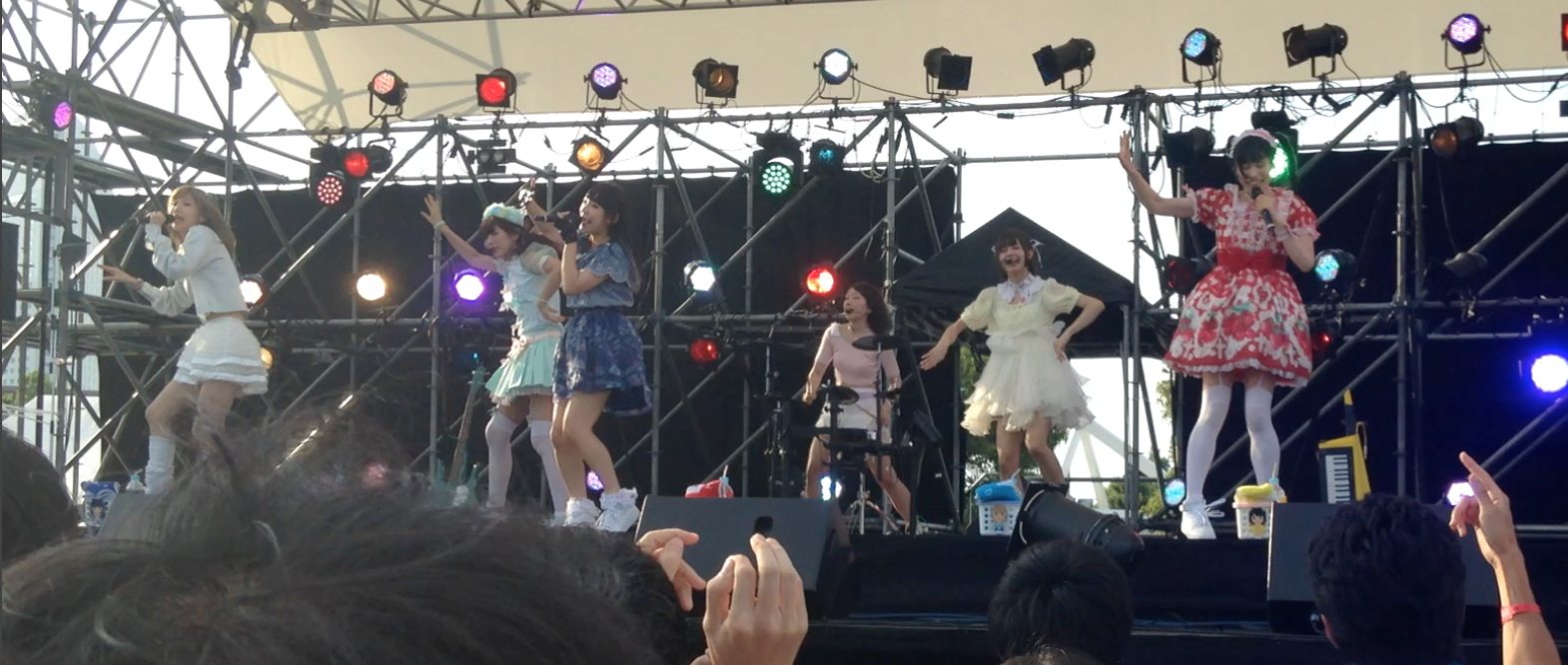
- Band Ja Naimon! on stage at Akarenga Yokocho (Yokohama Red Brick Warehouse) idol festival in Yokohama, July 3, 2016

Background information
- Origin: Tokyo, Japan
- Genres: J-pop
- Years active: 2011–present
- Label: Pony Canyon
- Members: Misako Suzuki; Ringo Koishio; Gumi Nanase; Miyu Mochizuki; Yuzu Amanatsu; Omomoko Sunrise
- Past members: Saori Kaneko; Ramune Mizutama
- Website: banmon.jp

Band Ja Naimon! MAXX NAKAYOSHI ( バンドじゃないもん！MAXX NAKAYOSHI, commonly abbreviated as BanMon, formerly known as Band Ja Naimon!) is a Japanese girl group, which consists of six members Misako Suzuki, Ringo Koishio, Gumi Nanase, Miyu Mochizuki, Yuzu Amanatsu, and Sunrise Omomoko. The group has signed with the label Pony Canyon. Misako is also the drummer for the band Shinsei Kamattechan. The name of the group literally means "we are not a band!" In 2016, their album Kimemaster! / Kimochi Dake Sanka Shimasu charted at number 7 on the weekly Oricon Singles Chart. On January 28, 2017, the group charted on the Billboard Japan Hot 100 Artists chart for the first time.

== History ==
Band Ja Naimon was formed in 2011 when Misako Suzuki, drummer for the band Shinsei Kamattechan, met Saori Kaneko. Saori knew how to play the drums and wanted to join a band, and Misako wanted to be part of a girl band. The two decided to create a "twin-drum" band soon after meeting. In February of the same year, the two held their first live performance as Band Ja Naimon. Initially, they asked other musicians to support them on stage with other instruments, but later decided that only the two would perform with both members playing drums and singing. The two of them were reluctant to change from a band to an idol group, but were encouraged by seeing other idol groups. They eventually made the transition as their songs changed. They released their self-titled debut album on October 3, 2012, under Warner Music Japan's label, unBORDE.

On May 7, 2013, the two members held a livestream announcing the addition of three new members: Ramune Mizutama, Ringo Koishio, and Gumi Nanase. Their official introduction as a five-person group was at the live performance on June 8 of that same year.

Kaneko announced in August 2013 she would be graduating from the group to prepare for her marriage. Her graduation concert was held on September 19, 2013, marking the end of the "twin-drum" era. At the end of the concert, the addition of a new member was announced to be revealed in October and formally join the group at their concert on October 18, 2013. The new member would also be appearing on the cover of their next single "Yuki Furu Yoruni Kisushite". On October 17, Miyu Mochizuki was revealed as the new member and group bass player.

On February 22, 2014, Mizutama announced her retirement from the group stating that the group's activities were conflicting with her personal activities and pursuits of other interests. At the same time, the group opened auditions for the first time in search of new members. Ramune graduated from the group on April 4, 2014. That same day, Yuzu Amanatsu and Omoko Sunrise (known as Momoko Amaterasu at the time) were announced as the new members. The official fan club, Chocolat Club, was founded on February 6, 2015. They renamed the group to Band Ja Naimon! MAXX NAKAYOSHI on November 9, 2018.

== Members ==
Current members
Name	Nickname	Date Joined	Color	Instrument	Birthday	Age	Hometown
Misako Suzuki (鈴姫みさこ)	Misako (みさこ)	2011 (Original member)	Pink (Leader)	Drums	Oct 11	Eternal 13 year old	Chiba Prefecture
Ringo Koishio (恋汐りんご)	Shiorin (しおりん)	June 8, 2013	Loving Apple		June 16	5 Pieces of apple	Gunma Prefecture
Gumi Nanase (ななせぐみ)	Gumi-tyan (ぐみてゃん)	June 8, 2013	Sadistic Blue		Mar 30	1000 gummies	Tokyo
Miyu Mochizuki (望月みゆ)	Miyu-chii (みゆちぃ)	Oct 18, 2013	Fairy Tale Green	Bass	June 4	One less than you	Kumamoto/Saga Area
Yuzu Amane (甘夏ゆず)	Yuzu-pon (ゆずポン)	May 16, 2014	Cotton Yellow	Guitar & Synthesizer	Aug 28	Don't have one in particular	Chiba Prefecture
Sunrise Omomoko (大桃子サンライズ)	Momo-chan (ももちゃん)	May 16, 2014	Deep Marine Blue		June 14	Innocent adult slightly over the drinking age	Pleiades Star Cluster

Former Members
Name	Nickname	Instrument	Date Joined	Date Left
Saori Kaneko(金子沙織)	Kacchan (かっちゃん)	Drums	2011 (original member)	September 19, 2013
Ramune Mizutama(水玉らむね)	Ramutin (らむてぃん)	Magical Tamborine	May 7, 2013	April 6, 2014

== Discography ==
※Following the official discography

=== Singles ===
※The ranks follow the weekly Oricon Singles Chart

#N	Date of release	Title	Rank	Catalog Number
1st	February 6, 2013	Chocolat Love	119th	WPZL-30534/5 (Limited Edition, CD+DVD) WPCL-11306 (Standard Edition, CD)
2nd	August 21, 2013	UP↑Prime / Tacatocotan - Forever -	-	PMFL-000
3rd	December 18, 2013	Yuki Furu Yoruni Kisushite	20th	WPCL-11676 (Limited Edition A) WPCL-11677 (Limited Edition B) WPCL-11678 (Standard Edition)
4th	September 17, 2014	Tsunagaru! Kanaderu! Music	14th	XQFL-91004 (Limited Edition) XQFL-1031 (Standard Edition)
5th	November 25, 2015	Namida / White Youth	11th	XQFL-91006 (Limited Edition 1) XQFL-91007 (Limited Edition 2) XQFL-91008 (Limited Edition 3) XQFL-91009 (Limited Edition 4) XQFL-91010 (Limited Edition 5) XQFL-91011 (Limited Edition 6) XQFL-1033 (Normal Edition)
6th	May 18, 2016	Kimemaster! / Kimochi Dake Sanka Shimasu	5th	BRCA-70014 (Limited Edition 1) BRCA-70015 (Limited Edition 2) BRCA-70016 (Limited Edition 3) BRCA-70017 (Limited Edition 4) BRCA-70018 (Limited Edition 5) BRCA-70019 (Limited Edition 6) PCCA-70470 (Standard Edition)
7th	August 24, 2016	Natsu no Oh! Baibusu	7th	PCCA-70480 (Limited Edition, Chou Chou Cream Ver.) PCCA-70481 (Limited Edition, Blue Twins Ver.) PCCA-70482 (Limited Edition, Cotton Rabbits Ver.) PCCA-70479 (Standard Edition, CD)
8th	January 11, 2017	YAKIMOCHI	5th	PCCA-70494 (New Year's Gift Edition A) PCCA-70495 (New Year's Gift Edition B) PCCA-70496 (New Year's Gift Edition C) PCCA-70493 (Standard Edition)
9th	January 11, 2017	YATTA!	8th	PCCA-70490 (New Year's Gift Edition A) PCCA-70491 (New Year's Gift Edition B) PCCA-70492 (New Year's Gift Edition C) PCCA-70489 (Standard Edition)
10th	May 17, 2017	METAMORISER / FAN+TIC	10th	PCCA-04543 (CD+DISC PLUS)
11th	October 11, 2017	Q.JINSEI SORE DE IINOKAI?	23rd	PCCA-70517
12th	May 9, 2018	BORN TO BE IDOL/Koi Suru Kanzen Hanzai	13th	PCCA-00086 (Misako Suzuki Edition, CD) PCCA-00087 (Ringo Koishio Edition, CD) PCCA-00088 (Gumi Nanase Edition, CD) PCCA-00089 (Miyu Mochizuki Edition, CD) PCCA-00090 (Yuzu Amanatsu Edition, CD) PCCA-00091 (Sunrise Omomoko Edition, CD) PCCA-04660 (Normal Edition, CD) PCCA-04659 (Limited Edition, 3CD+Blu-Ray)

=== Digital Download ===
#N	Date of release	Title	Rank	
1st	Dec 23, 2019	6 Respect	-	NKYR-001
2nd	June 10, 2020	God Song	-	NKYR-002

=== Albums ===
※The ranks follow the weekly Oricon Albums Chart

#N	Date of release	Title	Rank	Product Code
1st	October 3, 2012	Band Ja Naimon!	149th	WPCL-11176
2nd	April 22, 2014	Re:start	22nd	XQFL-91005 (Limited Edition, CD+DVD) XQFL-1032 (Standard Edition, CD)
3rd	March 8, 2017	Kanpekishugi Na Sekai Ni Fukanzen Na Ongakuwo	4th	PCCA-04478 (Limited Edition, CD+Blu-Ray) PCCA-04477 (Standard Edition, CD)
4th	December 13, 2017	Mini Ban!	15th	PCCA-04609 (Limited Edition, CD+Blu-Ray) PCCA-04610 (Standard Edition, CD)
5th	April 3, 2019	NO LIMIT	13th	SCCA-00073 (Legacy Edition, CD + 3 Blu-Ray) PCCA-04764 (Limited Edition, CD+Blu-Ray) PCCA-04765 (Standard Edition, CD)
6th	January 31, 2023	Kanpekishugi Na Sekai Ni Fukanzen Na Ongakuwo 2		NKYR-5

=== Best-Of Albums ===
#N	Date of release	Title	Rank	
1st	May 19, 2021	BanMon! BEST- Goku Nakayoshiteki Sekai	7th	NKYR-1001 (Limited Edition, CD + DVD) NKYR-0003 (Standard Edition, CD)

=== Filmography ===
#N	Date of release	Title	
1st	January 30, 2015	Band Ja Naimon! LIVE DVD	PMFL-90001
2nd	October 24, 2015	Band Ja Naimon! LIVE DVD vol.2	PMFL-90002
3rd	October 26, 2016	Zenkoku tour 2016 ~ Teppen Mezasouze! Mushyashyugyou hen ~ LIVE Blu-ray	BRXP-00009 (Limited Memorial Box Edition, 2 Blu-Ray + 2 CD) PCXP-50446 (Standard Edition, Blu-Ray)
4th	August 23, 2017	Band Ja Naimon! Oneman Live 2017 Tokyo Dada Dash! - Chanto Ase Kakanakya XXXX -	BRXP-00011 (Limited Memorial Box Edition, Blu-Ray+CD) PCXP-50510 (Standard Edition, Blu-Ray) PCBP-53217 (Standard Edition, DVD)
5th	October 5, 2019	JAPAN TOUR 2019 Reiwa Gennen！NAKAYOSHI Bakufu at Hibiya Open Air Concert Hall LIVE DVD	PMVP-0003
6th	September 17, 2021	Banmon! Hasshuunen Suru Hirogari Tour Final @Zepp DiverCity Tokyo	PMVP-0018
