= Rino Sashihara =

Japanese music producer, television personality, and entrepreneur (born 1992)

- 指原 莉乃
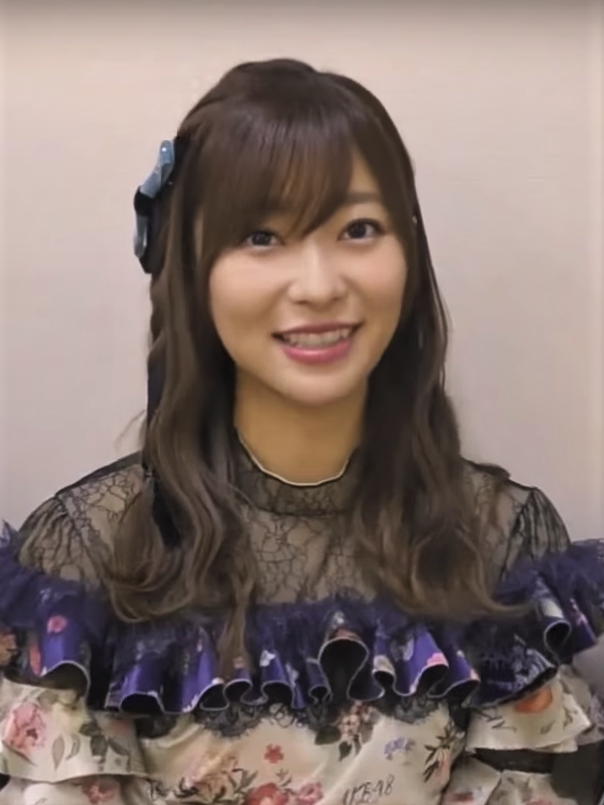
- Rino Sashihara in 2018
- Born: November 21, 1992 (age 33); Ōita, Ōita, Japan
- Occupations: Music producer; television personality; entrepreneur
- Years active: 2008–present
- Agent: Ohta Production
- Musical career
- Genre: J-pop
- Label: Avex Group (via Avex Trax)
- Formerly of: AKB48; HKT48; STU48; Not Yet

YouTube information
- Channel: Sashihara Channel
- Genres: Vlog; comedy; music
- Subscribers: 1,140,000
- Views: 112,829,206
- Last updated: 2 August 2022

Rino Sashihara (指原 莉乃, Sashihara Rino; born November 21, 1992) is a Japanese music producer, television personality, and entrepreneur. She is best known as the producer of the girl groups =Love, ≠Me, and ≒Joy, and as a former member of girl groups HKT48, AKB48, and STU48. She holds the record for winning the annual AKB48 Group General Elections four times. She was also chairperson of the Tokyo Idol Festival from 2017 to 2021.

Sashihara joined AKB48 in 2007, and in 2011 became a member of its subgroup Not Yet, which released several singles as a separate unit. She was transferred to HKT48 in Hakata, Fukuoka Prefecture, in 2012, where she became theater manager in 2013. 2017 marked several major milestones of her career, as she became a founding member and theater manager of STU48; launched her first idol group as producer, =Love (Equal Love); won the AKB48 Group General Elections for the fourth time; and became chairperson of the Tokyo Idol Festival. She left HKT48 in 2019, and has since produced two sister groups to =Love: ≠Me (Not Equal Me) in 2019 and ≒Joy (Nearly Equal Joy) in 2022.

Aside from music production, Sashihara is a prominent variety television personality, as well as co-founder and producer of the cosmetic brand Ririmew (リリミュウ) and the contact lens brand Topards.

== Career ==
=== 2007–2012: AKB48 ===
In October 2007, Sashihara was accepted as a trainee for the 5th generation of AKB48. She was promoted to a regular member of Team B in August 2008. Her first title track single was "Ōgoe Diamond", released in October of that year. She placed 27th in the 2009 AKB48 Group General Elections, where fans voted for the members to be included in the singer lineups for the next AKB48 single, and was assigned to the "Under Girls" lineup, who would perform on the first B-side singles. She remained in that position for subsequent single releases until the 2010 General Elections, where she placed 19th and was assigned to the primary group, known as Senbatsu (選抜; lit. 'selection'), who perform the title track. In August 2009, AKB48 announced that she would transfer to Team A, although the transfer did not occur until July 2010.

On December 4, 2010, Sashihara attempted to upload 100 articles in a day on her official blog, with the number of page views reaching 35 million on the same day.

In January 2011, Sashihara starred in a half-hour television program titled You're Just Sashiko (This Program Is Totally Unrelated to AKB) (さしこのくせに〜この番組はAKBとは全く関係ありません〜, Sashiko no Kuseni (Kono Bangumi wa AKB to wa Mattaku Kankei Arimasen)), broadcast by TBS, which features her hetare (ヘタレ; lit. 'incompetent' or 'loser') persona. The program was subtitled "A variety program to train Sashiko" (さしこ育成バラエティ, Sashiko Ikusei Variety).

Sashihara starred in the NTV4 drama Muse no Kagami starting on January 14, 2012. She sang the theme song, "Soredemo Suki Da yo", which was released as her debut solo single on May 2 on the major record label Avex Trax.

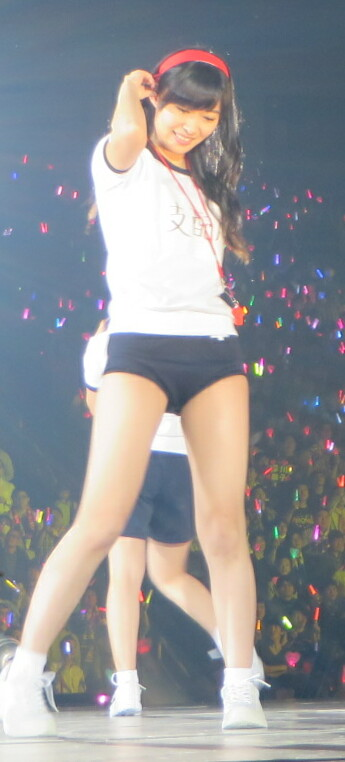
Sashihara at an AKB48 live performance in 2012

Sashihara produced the idol festival Yubi Matsuri, held at Nippon Budokan on June 25 and featuring girl groups such as Momoiro Clover Z, Idoling!!!, Shiritsu Ebisu Chugaku, Super Girls, Tokyo Girls' Style, Passpo and Watarirouka Hashiritai 7.

=== 2012–2017: Transition to HKT48, four-time AKB48 Group General Elections winner ===
On June 16, 2012, Sashihara was transferred to HKT48 after the tabloid Shukan Bunshun published an interview with a man who claimed to have had an intimate relationship with her. She stated in response that the man was "just a friend" and that the story was completely false. Four days later, she had a panic attack onstage, and hyperventilated due to the stress. She debuted at the HKT48 Theater as a member of HKT48 Team H on July 5, 2012.

Sashihara released her second solo single, "Ikujinashi Masquerade", on October 17, 2012. The single reached number one on the Oricon Weekly chart, becoming the third solo single by an AKB48 member to reach that milestone.

In 2013, Sashihara assumed the position of HKT48 co-manager and theater manager, while continuing to be a member of HKT48 Team H. Her promotion was seen by some in the media as a confirmation of producer Yasushi Akimoto's intention to grant her a role in the management of the group due to her production skills, something he had been hinting at since as early as 2010. She produced SKE48 member Kaori Matsumura's first solo single "Matsumurabu", with free rein over costume design, lyrics writing, music video direction, as well as choice of music and instrumental arrangement.

Also in 2013, Sashihara won the annual AKB48 Group General Elections for the first time with 150,570 votes, beating previous year winner Yuko Oshima's 136,503 votes and making her the center (lead performer) for the first time for the single "Koi Suru Fortune Cookie".

In wake of her mainstream popularity, on August 11, 2014, Sashihara's first autobiography, Gyakutenryoku: Pinch o Mate (逆転力～ピンチを待て～; lit. 'Power of Reversal: Wait For a Crisis'), was published by Kodansha, selling over 20,000 copies in its first week of release and prompting a number of subsequent reprints. The book was based on a series of interviews with Sashihara and recollects various periods of her life and career. It was widely advertised by the media as a self-improvement volume recommended for working adults.

After taking second place to Mayu Watanabe in 2014, Sashihara won the AKB48 Group General Elections three years in a row with a total of 194,049 votes in 2015, 243,011 votes in 2016, and 246,376 votes in 2017. She opted out of the 2018 Elections, which would be the last such event to be held.

In 2017, Sashihara announced the audition for voice actress idols on April 29 and started producing the idol group =Love (Equal Love), consisting of voice actresses from the Yoyogi Animation Academy. In February, she became member and theater manager of the newly founded STU48, and resigned on November 25 to focus on HKT48. She also became chairperson of the annual Tokyo Idol Festival, where =Love had their first live performance in August; she would hold this position until she was succeeded by Neru Nagahama in 2021.

=== 2017–present: Idol production and other business ventures ===
On December 15, 2018, Sashihara announced that she would depart from HKT48. Her "graduation" concert, titled "Sashihara Rino Graduation Concert ~Sayonara, Sashihara Rino~", was held on April 28, 2019, three days before Japan's transition to the Reiwa era; she commented that she wanted to "do [her] best as an idol" until the very end of the Heisei era.

Sashihara launched ≠Me (Not Equal Me) in 2019 and ≒Joy (Nearly Equal Joy) in 2022 as sister groups to =Love. She won the Lyrics Award in the 67th Japan Record Awards for the =Love song "Tokubechu, Shite" in 2025.

Sashihara is co-founder and producer of the cosmetic brand Ririmew (リリミュウ), founded in 2022 in collaboration with talent agency Twin Planet and cosmetics manufacturer Koji Honpo, and the contact lens brand Topards. Ririmew products have won awards from prominent beauty portals LDK the Beauty in 2022 and @cosme in 2025.

== AKB48 General Election placements ==
Sashihara's placements in AKB48's annual general election:

Edition	Year	Final rank	Number of votes	Position on single	Single	Ref.
1	2009	27	1,170	Undergirls	"Tobenai Agehachou (B-side on "Iiwake Maybe")	
2	2010	19	6,704	Senbatsu	"Heavy Rotation"	
3	2011	9	45,227	Media Senbatsu	"Flying Get"	
4	2012	4	67,339	Senbatsu	"Gingham Check"	
5	2013	1	150,570	Center	"Koi Suru Fortune Cookie"	
6	2014	2	141,954	Senbatsu	"Kokoro no Placard"	
7	2015	1	194,049	Center	"Halloween Night"	
8	2016	1	243,011	Center	"Love Trip / Shiawase wo Wakenasai"	
9	2017	1	246,376	Center	"#SukiNanda"	

== Discography ==
=== Solo singles ===
Year	Title	Chart position			Oricon sales		Notes
Year	Title	Oricon Weekly Singles Chart	Billboard Japan Hot 100*	RIAJ Digital Track Chart*	First week	Total	Notes
2012	"Soredemo Suki Da yo"	2	1	6	124,483	151,724	
2012	"Ikujinashi Masquerade"	1	4		68,403	85,798	with Anrire (Rina Kawaei, Rena Katō, Anna Iriyama)

* RIAJ Digital Track Chart was established in April 2009 and discontinued in July 2012.

=== Singles with HKT48 ===
Year	Title	Role	Notes
2013	"Suki! Suki! Skip!"	A-side	Also sang on "Onegai Valentine", "Ima ga Ichiban" and "Seifuku no Bambi"
2013	"Melon Juice"	A-side	Also sang on "Doro no Metronome" and "Namioto no Orugoru"
2014	"Sakura, Minnade Tabeta"	A-side	Also sang on "Kimi wa Doushite?", "Kidoku Suru" with Team H and "Kimino Kotoga Sukiyaken"
2014	"Hikaeme I Love You!"	A-side	Also sang on "Idol no Ouja" with Team H
2015	"12 Byō"	A-side	Also sang on "Rock Da yo, Jinsei wa..." and "Chameleon Joshikōsei" with Team H
2015	"Shekarashika!"	A-side	Also sang on "Tasogare no Tandem" and "Buddy" with Team H
2016	"74 Okubun no 1 no Kimi e"	A-side	Also sang on "Chain of love"
2016	"Saikō Kayo"	A-side	Also sang on "Yume Hitotsu" and "Yozora no Tsuki o Nomikomou" with Team H
2017	"Bagutte Iijan"	A-side, Center	Also sang on "Hitsuzenteki Koibito" and "HKT48 Family"
2017	"Kiss wa Matsushikanai no Deshōka?"	A-side	
2018	"Hayaokuri Calendar"	A-side	Also sang on "Kisetsu no Sei ni Shitaku wa nai"
2019	"Ishi"	A-side, Center	Graduation single. Also sang on "Dare Yori Te wo Furou" and "Itsudatte Soba ni Iru" (graduation song)

=== Singles with AKB48 ===
Year	No.	Title	Role	Notes
2008	10	"Oogoe Diamond"	A-side	Debut in Team B.
2009	11	"10nen Sakura"	A-side	Also sang on "Sakurairo no Sora no Shita de".
2009	12	"Namida Surprise!"	A-side	Also sang on "Shonichi" as Team B.
2009	13	"Iiwake Maybe"	Under Girls	Did not sing on title track. Ranked 27th in 2009 General Election. Sang on "Tobenai Agehachō".
2009	14	"River"	Under Girls	Did not sing on title track. Sang on "Kimi no Koto ga Suki Dakara".
2010	15	"Sakura no Shiori"	Team Young Jump	Did not sing on title track. Sang on "Choose Me!" as Team Young Jump. Debut in Team A.
2010	16	"Ponytail to Shushu"	Under Girls	Did not sing on title track. Sang on "Nusumareta Kuchibiru" and "Majijo Teppen Blues".
2010	17	"Heavy Rotation"	A-side	Ranked 19th in 2010 General Election. Also sang on "Yasai Sisters" as Yasai Sisters and "Lucky Seven".
2010	18	"Beginner"	A-side	
2010	19	"Chance no Junban"	B-side	Did not sing on title track; lineup was determined by rock-paper-scissors tournament. Sang on "Yoyakushita Christmas", and on "Kurumi to Dialogue" as Team A.
2011	20	"Sakura no Ki ni Narou"	A-side	
2011	–	"Dareka no Tame ni – What can I do for someone?"	–	Charity single
2011	21	"Everyday, Katyusha"	A-side	Also sang on "Korekara Wonderland" and "Yankee Soul"
2011	22	"Flying Get"	A-side	Ranked 9th in 2011 General Election. Also sang on "Seishun to Kizukanai Mama" and "Yasai Uranai" as Yasai Sisters.
2011	23	"Kaze wa Fuiteiru"	A-side	
2011	24	"Ue kara Mariko"	B-side	Did not sing on title track; lineup was determined by rock-paper-scissors tournament. Sang on "Noël no Yoru", and "Rinjin wa Kizutsukanai" as Team A.
2012	25	"Give Me Five!"	A-side (Baby Blossom), Selection 6	A-side single group was called Baby Blossom, where she played trombone. She also sang on "Sweet & Bitter" as Selection 6.
2012	26	"Manatsu no Sounds Good!"	A-side	Also sang on "Chōdai, Darling!"
2012	27	"Gingham Check"	A-side	Ranked 4th in 2012 General Election. Participated from HKT48 Team H.
2012	28	"Uza"	A-side	
2012	29	"Eien Pressure"	B-side	Did not sing on title track. Sang "Hatsukoi Butterfly" as HKT48.
2013	30	"So Long!"	A-side	
2013	31	"Sayonara Crawl"	A-side	Also sang on "Hasute to Wasute" as BKA48.
2013	32	"Koi Suru Fortune Cookie"	A-side, Center	Ranked 1st in 2013 General Election. Also sang on "Namida no Sei Janai" and "Saigo no Door".
2013	33	"Heart Electric"	A-side	In main lineup with the nickname Rola.
2013	34	"Suzukake no Ki no Michi de "Kimi no Hohoemi o Yume ni Miru" to Itte Shimattara Bokutachi no Kankei wa Dō Kawatte Shimau no ka, Bokunari ni Nannichi ka Kangaeta Ue de no Yaya Kihazukashii Ketsuron no Yō na Mono"	B-side	Did not sing on title track; lineup was determined by rock-paper-scissors tournament. Sang on "Mosh & Dive". Sang on "Wink wa Sankai" as HKT48.
2014	35	"Mae Shika Mukanee"	A-side	
2014	36	"Labrador Retriever"	A-side	Also sang on "Kyou Made no Melody".
2014	37	"Kokoro no Placard"	A-side	Ranked 2nd in AKB48 6th General Elections.
2014	38	"Kibouteki Refrain"	A-side	
2015	39	"Green Flash"	A-side	Also sang "Hakimono to Kasa no Monogatari" and "Otona Ressha" as HKT48..
2015	40	"Bokutachi wa Tatakawanai"	A-side	Also sang "Kimi ni Dai-ni shou".
2015	41	"Halloween Night"	A-side, Center	Ranked 1st in 2015 General Election. Also sang "Ippome Ondo".
2015	42	"Kuchibiru ni Be My Baby"	A-side	Minami Takahashi's graduation single. Also sang "365 Nichi no Kamihikōki" and "Senaka Kotoba".
2016	43	"Kimi wa Melody"	A-side	Also sang "Mazariau Mono", "Make Noise" as HKT48 and center.
2016	44	"Tsubasa wa Iranai"	A-side	Also sang
2016	45	"Love Trip / Shiawase wo Wakenasai"	A-side, Center	Ranked 1st in 2016 General Election. Also sang on "Hikari to Kage no Hibi".
2016	46	"High Tension"	A-side	Haruka Shimazaki's graduation single.
2017	47	"Shoot Sign"	A-side	Haruna Kojima's graduation single. Also sang on "Tomaranai Kanransha" as HKT48.
2017	48	"Negaigoto no Mochigusare"	A-side	Also sang on "Ima Para" as center and "Setouchi no Koe" as STU48.
2017	49	"Sukinanda"	A-side, Center	Ranked 1st in 2017 General Election.
2017	50	"11gatsu no Anklet"	A-side	Mayu Watanabe's graduation single.
2018	51	"Jabaja"	A-side	Also sang on "Buttaoreru Made" as HKT48 and WCenter with Miyawaki Sakura.
2018	52	"Teacher Teacher"	A-side	Also sang on "Kimi wa Boku no Kaze" as Center Exam Senbatsu.
2018	54	"No Way Man"	A-side	
2019	55	"Jiwaru Days"	A-side, Center	Graduation single. Also sang on "Watashi Datte Idol!"(graduation song) and "Hitsuzensei" as IZ4648.
2025	66	"Oh My Pumpkin!"	A-side	Anniversary single

=== Albums with AKB48 ===
Kamikyokutachi

- "Kimi to Niji to Taiyō to"

Koko ni Ita Koto

- "Shōjotachi yo"
- "Overtake"
- "Kaze no Yukue"
- "Koko ni Ita Koto"

1830m

- "First Rabbit"
- "Ren'ai Sōsenkyo"
- "Abogado Ja nē Shi..."
- "Itterasshai"
- "Aozora yo Sabishikunai Ka?"

Tsugi no Ashiato

- "After Rain"
- "Boy Hunt no Houhou Oshiemasu"

Koko ga Rhodes da, Koko de Tobe!

- "Setsunai Reply"
- "Ai no Sonzai"

0 to 1 no Aida

- "Yasashiku Aritai"

== Performance groups ==
Team B 3rd Stage Pajama Drive (パジャマドライブ)

- "Kagami no Naka no Jean D'Arc" (鏡の中のジャンヌ・ダルク) (after Ayaka Kikuchi's graduation)

Team K 4th Stage Saishū Bell ga Naru (最終ベルが鳴る)
Team A 4th Stage Tadaima Renaichū (ただいま恋愛中)

- "Faint"

Kenkyūsei Tadaima Renaichū (ただいま恋愛中)

- "Faint"

Team B 4th Stage Idol no Yoake (アイドルの夜明け)

- "Itoshiki Natasha" (愛しきナターシャ)

Team Kenkyūsei Idol no Yoake (アイドルの夜明け)

- "Zannen Shōjo" (残念少女)
- "Itoshiki Natasha" (愛しきナターシャ)

Theatre G-Posso Yume o Shinaseru Wake ni wa Ikanai (夢を死なせるわけにいかない)

- "Confession"

Team A 6th Stage Mokugekisha (目撃者)

- "Enjou Rosen" (炎上路線)
- "Saboten to Goldrush" (サボテンとゴールドラッシュ)

Team H 1st Stage Te o Tsunagi Nagara (手をつなぎながら)

- "Glory Days"
- "Kono Mune no Barcode" (この胸のバーコード)

Team H Waiting Stage Hakata Legend (博多レジェンド)

- "Seifuku Resistance" (制服レジスタンス)
- "Seifuku no Bambi" (制服のバンビ)

Himawari-gumi Pajama Drive (パジャマドライブ)

- "Kagami no Naka no Jean D'Arc" (鏡の中のジャンヌ・ダルク)

Team H 2nd Stage Seishun Girls (青春ガールズ)

- "Blue Rose"
- "Fushidara na Natsu" (ふしだらな夏)

Team H 3rd Stage Saishuu Bell ga naru (最終ベルが鳴る)

- "Oshibe to Meshibe to Yoru no Chouchou" (おしべとめしべと夜の蝶々)

== Appearances ==
=== Music videos ===
Title	Director	Notes
"Soredemo Suki Da yo"		
"Ikujinashi Masquerade" (Kawaei Rina Center ver.)		
"Ikujinashi Masquerade" (Theater Edition Muse's Mirror ver.)		

=== Films ===
- Muse no Kagami (2012), Maki Mukouda
- Kodomo Keisatsu (2013), Rino Makihara
- I'll Give It My All... Tomorrow (2013), Aya Unami
- Barairo no Būko (2014), Sachiko (Būko)
- Crayon Shin-Chan: My Moving Story! Cactus Large Attack! (2015), Sumaho-chan (voice)
- One Piece: Stampede (2019), Anne (voice)
- Goodbye, Don Glees! (2022), Mako Kamogawa (voice)

=== Dubbing ===
- Hop (2011), Pink Berets

=== TV dramas ===
- Majisuka Gakuen (TV Tokyo, 2010), Wota
- Dr.Irabu Ichirō (TV Asahi, 2011), herself
- Majisuka Gakuen 2 (TV Tokyo, 2011), Wota
- Muse no Kagami (NTV, 2012), Maki Mukouda
- Fukuoka Renai Hakusho (KBC, 2012), Kaori
- Kodomo Keisatsu Episode 6 (MBS, 2012), Rino Makihara
- Megutantte Mahō Tsukaeru no? Episode 6 (NTV, 2012), Maki Mukouda
- Yūsha Yoshihiko to Akuryō no Kagi Episode 9 (TV Tokyo, 2012), Eliza
- Honto ni Atta Kowai Hanashi Natsu no Tokubetsuhen 2013 "Ugomeku Ningyō" (Fuji TV, 2013), Rina Sonoda
- Tenmasan ga Yuku Episode 5 (TBS, 2013), Miyoko Oshimizu
- Majisuka Gakuen 4 Episode 1 (Nippon TV, 2015), Scandal
- Koinaka Episode 9 (Fuji TV, 2015)
- Majisuka Gakuen 0: Kisarazu Rantōhen Episode 1 (Nippon Television, 2015), Ageman
- AKB Horror Night: Adrenaline's Night Ep.31 – Another Meeting Person (TV Asashi, 2016), Sayaka
- AKB Love Night: Love Factory Ep.19 – Italian String (TV Asashi, 2016), Akiko

== Bibliography ==
- Gyakutenryoku: Pinch o Mate (逆転力～ピンチを待て～; lit. 'Power of Reversal: Wait For a Crisis') (Kodansha, August 11, 2014) ISBN 9784063898507

=== Photobooks ===
- B.L.T. U-17 vol.8 (Tokyo News Service, November 6, 2008) ISBN 9784863360303
- B.L.T. U-17 vol.11 sizzleful girl 2009 summer (Tokyo News Service, August 5, 2009) ISBN 9784863360600
- Sashiko (Kodansha, January 19, 2012) ISBN 9784063896329
- Neko ni Maketa (Kobunsha, December 26, 2013) ISBN 9784334901981
- Scandal Chūdoku (Kodansha, March 22, 2016) ISBN 9784063899528

== Awards and nominations ==
Year	Award(s)	Category	Nominated work	Result	Refs.
2025	Japan Record Awards	Best Lyrics Award	Tokubetsu, Shite	Won	
2026	MTV Video Music Awards Japan	Best Producer	Herself	Won	
