= Idol College =

Japanese idol girl group

- Origin: Japan
- Labels: Dreamusic; Stand-Up! Records
- Website: idolcollege.com

Idol College (アイドルカレッジ) is a Japanese idol girl group. Their single "Be My☆Zombie" reached the sixth place on the weekly Oricon Singles Chart. The title song from their single "True End Player" is the ending song of the 2014 video game Hyperdimension Neptunia Re;Birth 3: V Century and the title song from their single "Ichizu Recipe" is the opening song of the 2015 anime television series Shomin Sample.

== Discography ==
=== Albums ===
Title	Release date	Oricon
Idol College no tsutaetai koto	July 24, 2013	29
idolcollege	April 20, 2016	14

=== Singles ===
Title	Release date	Oricon
"Ganbare!! Otome!!/Ichigo parfait"	March 10, 2010	31
"Shōjo sotsugyō/YOZORA"	February 13, 2013	15
"Ano koga, kami wo, kiranai riyū。"	July 30, 2014	13
"True End Player"	December 3, 2014	17
"#Tokonatsu Joshi Kibou!!!"	May 13, 2015	11
"Be My☆Zombie"	October 7, 2015	6
"Ichizu Recipe"	December 2, 2015	9
"Niji to Tokimeki no Fes"	December 14, 2016	10
"Pantastic!"	May 10, 2017	-
"Wonderful Story"	October 4, 2017	9
"Akatsuki"	July 11, 2018	6
"Masquerade"	December 11, 2019	11
"GOES ON"	December 9, 2020	8
"Mugamuchū Days"	August 04, 2021	25
