= Iginari Tohoku San =

Japanese idol girl group

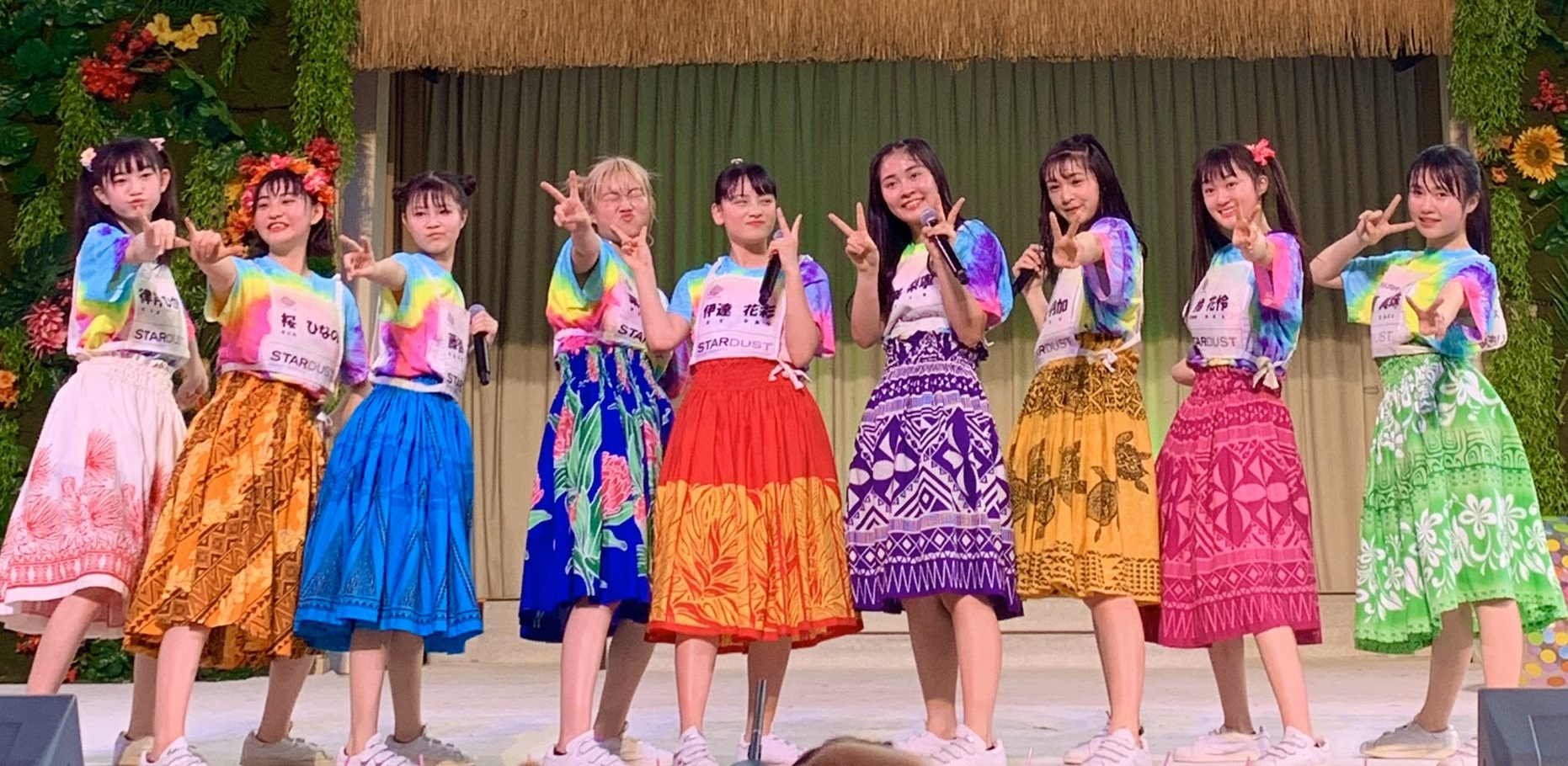

Background information
- Origin: Tohoku Region, Japan
- Genres: J-pop; pop
- Years active: 2015–present
- Labels: Stardust Records (2015–2017); ONOBORI RECORDS (2017–2025) avex trax (2025–present)
- Members: Tachibana Karen; Hazuki Yuna; Ritsuki Hikaru; Kitami Rine; Yasumori Waka; Sakura Hinano; Fujitani Miu; Date Kaaya; Shinju Kichise
- Past members: Minato Risa
- Website: http://madeintohoku.com/

Iginari Tohoku San (いぎなり東北産, stylized in English as MADE IN TOHOKU) is a Japanese girl idol group, formed by Stardust Promotion in August 2015.

The group is based in Tohoku Region and is managed by Stardust Promotion's regional Sendai office.

== Members ==
Name	Color	Birthdate	Nickname	Notes
Karen Tachibana (橘花怜)	Pink	October 21, 2003 (age 22)	Karen-kun	Leader
Yuna Hazuki (葉月結菜)	Blue	September 15, 2002 (age 23)	Yunapoko Haju	Sub-Leader
Hikaru Ritsuki (律月ひかる)	Pure White	July 31, 2001 (age 24)	Hikarun	Oldest Member
Rine Kitami (北美梨寧)	Purple	May 28, 2002 (age 24)	Rineko	
Waka Yasumori (安杜羽加)	Yellow	October 30, 2002 (age 23)	Wakarin	
Hinano Sakura (桜ひなの)	Orange	May 6, 2004 (age 22)	Hinamon MonChan	
Miu Fujitani (藤谷美海)	Light Blue	March 9, 2005 (age 21)	MiuChan Kojika	
Kaaya Date (伊達花彩)	Red	March 21, 2005 (age 21)	KaayaChan	Youngest Member, Between April 2020 to March 2021 suspends the activities with the group due to her joining on the Dorama "Aikatsu Planet" (lead role)
Shinju Kichise (吉瀬真珠)	Green	June 22, 2003 (age 22)	Pearl, ShinChan	Ex iDOL Street, Joined November 23, 2018

=== Former members ===
Name	Color	Birthdate	Nickname	Notes
Risa Minato (湊梨紗)	Green	September 2, 2001 (age 24)	RisaChan Risachi	Graduated on October 14, 2017

=== Timeline ===
- On 12/04/2017 there was a change of color for Miu and Karen

== History ==
2015

On August 9, the group appeared in the Stardust Section 3 Sales Office Festival at the Grand Front Osaka Knowledge Theater as a five-person group called Nidaime Iginari. The original members were Hikaru Ritsuki, Risa Minato, Rine Kitami, Yuna Hazuki, and Waka Yasumori. The average age of the group was 12.8.

On September 12, Hinano Sakura and Kaaya Date joined the group.

On October 24, Karen Tachibana was incorporated into the group in the Stardust Section 3 event Eigyousho Matsuri.

2016

On July 3, Miu Fujitani joined the group, bringing the total number of group members to nine. Karen Tachibana was named as the leader of the group and Yuna Hazuki as sub-leader. The average age of the group was then 12.6.

On August 7, the group appeared at the Tokyo Idol Festival 2016.

On November 27, the group's single "Tenka Ippin" was shown at Darwin Event. They change their group name to Iginari Tohoku San.

2017

On January 8, Karen, Hikaru, Risa, Rine, and Waka participated in Stardust Section 3 event Ore No Next Girl 2017 Mochiron Fujii. They won first place and the opportunity of acting in Stella Ball.

On February 19, Tohoku announced the release of its first album.

On March 26, First Two Man Live with Sakura Ebis, Tenka Ippin was released, as was Mugen Kageki (a collaboration single with Sakura Ebis).

On April 2, Risa Minato took an indefinite hiatus.

On April 21, the group's official blog was started.

On May 5, the group performed Second Two Man Live with Sakura Ebis in Miyagi La La La Hall.

On June 24, they announced their first tour for August 2017, with planned stops in Aomori, Yamagata, Fukushima, and Omiya.

On June 24, the group announced that the release date of their second single "High Tension Summer" would be on July 30, 2017.

On July 30, "High Tension Summer" was released. The group presented their official overture.

On August 4 and 5, the group appeared in the Tokyo Idol Festival 2017, performing a total of four times.

On August 6, the group participated in the SIF (Idol festival hosted by Momoclo). They received third place in the competition of the best performance of the festival with 986 points.

On August 12–16, they released their Car Tour.

On September 20, Minato Risa confirms her graduation for October 14 Event.

On November 19, "Travel" was released.

On December 23, their first Christmas Event at @Sendai Wakabayashi Ward Cultural Center Hall was held. They mobilized 534 people and overcame the target of 500. They presented the new single Kansai Nippon.

On December 31, they appeared at the Western Japan Idol Festival hosted by Tacoyaki Rainbow (Grand Cube Osaka).

2018

On February 12, they appeared at the 3 man festival with Sakura Ebis, Petit Passpo and Up up girls on Yokohama bay hall

On March 4, they appeared at Hawaiians Monthly Super Live (@ Spa Resort Hawaiians).

On March 21, "Itadaki Launcher" was released.

on May 27, In the "Eagles Event (First ball start ceremony)". The release of the 5th single was announced for July 14. They talked about the possibility of new members joining the group.

on June 7, Karen fulfills her dream and sings for the first time with Sasaki Ayaka (Momoiro Clover Z) in the Sakazaki Kounosuke no Momoiro Folk Mura show. Aarin was the reason why she becomes an idol.

On November 3, The group announced by twitcast that in the concert of December 30 in Toyosu PIT a new member will be incorporated.

On November 23, Shinju Kichise joined the group.

On December 30, The official page madeintohoku.com was opened. The number of attendants on their Christmas Event grew to 1021 people.

2019

On March 3–31, The group did their first Live House Tour (Morioka, Sendai, Koriyama, Yamagata, Akita, Aomori)

On August 9, In the 4th Anniversary of the group, they launched their first MV "BUUBLE POPPIN"

2020

On March 20, The group released their first Album "Tohoku Inbound"

On August 10, Kahya chan becomes the main character of the new dorama/anime live-action Aikatsu Planet

== Discography ==
=== Indie singles (SDR, Onobori Records) ===
Order	Title	Release date	Notes
1	Tenka Ippin	March 26, 2017	Only for sale in events and in HMV Japan
2	High Tension Summer	July 30, 2017	Only for sale in events and in HMV Japan
3	Travel	November 19, 2017	Only for sale in events and in HMV Japan
4	Itadaki Launcher	March 21, 2018	Only for sale in events and in HMV Japan
5	Onobori Girl	July 14, 2018	Only for sale in events and in HMV Japan
6	Hyakka Ryouran Monogatari	November 23, 2018	Only for sale in events and in HMV Japan
7	Burnin' Heart	April 27, 2019	Only for sale in events and in HMV Japan
/	Bubble Poppin	August 9, 2019	No single release, 1st MV
8	No Make	November 23, 2019	Only for sale in events and in HMV Japan
9	re;star	October 24, 2020	Only for sale in events and in HMV Japan

=== Major-label singles (Avex) ===
Order	Title	Release date	Oricon weekly ranking	Sales
1	Love♡Sensation	October 08, 2025	4th	38,422 oricon
2	Deco!	March 18, 2026	7th	23,509 oricon

=== Indie albums (SDR, Onobori Records) ===
Order	Title	Release date	Oricon weekly ranking
1	Tohoku Inbound	March 20, 2020	
2	Tokyo Invader	June 6, 2021	34
3	Tohoku San Banpaku	April 6, 2024	43
1 Mini Album	Budokan Rehearsal	March 5, 2022	
2 Mini Album	Major Debut	November 11, 2022	45
3 Mini Album	The Tohoku San	August 9, 2023	

Collaboration singles

Order	Title	Release date	Notes
1	"Mugen Kageki"	March 26, 2017	With Sakura Ebis. Only for sale in events.
