= Cynhn =

Japanese idol girl group

- Origin: Japan
- Genre: J-pop
- Years active: 2017–present
- Label: I Blue
- Members: Shiki Ayase; Neru Tsukumo; Tōru Aoyagi; Minori Hirose
- Past members: Manari Ōsaka; Soto Sakino; Rei Momose
- Website: cynhn.com

Cynhn (stylized in all caps as CYNHN (СУИНИ, スウィーニー)) is a Japanese idol girl group formed in 2017. They released their debut single, "Finalegend", on November 1, 2017.

== History ==
Cynhn debuted in November 2017 with the single, "Finalegend". Their second single, "Haribote", was released in April 2018, followed by their third single, "Tachypsychia / So Young", in September 2018, and their fourth single, "Zekkō Kyōshū / Amairo Hologram", in December 2018. Their fifth single, "Kūki to Ink / Wire", was released in March 2019. They released their first studio album, Tablature, in June 2019. Their sixth single, "2-ji no Parade", was released in November 2019. Manari Ōsaka graduated from the group in December 2019. Their seventh single, "Suisei", was released in March 2020. They released their eighth single, "Goku Heibon na Ao wa", in September 2020. Their first EP, #0F4C81, was released in December 2020. Soto Sakino graduated from the group in January 2021. They released their ninth single, "Aoawase", in July 2021. Their second album, Blue Cresc., was released in February 2022. Minori Hirose joined the group in June 2022. They released their tenth single, "Kilig Near", in August 2022. Their eleventh single, "Raku no Uwanuri", was released in January 2023. Rei Momose graduated from the group in September 2023. Their second EP, Aufheben, was released in September 2023.

== Members ==
=== Current ===
- Shiki Ayase (綾瀬志希)
- Neru Tsukumo (月雲ねる)
- Tōru Aoyagi (青柳透)
- Minori Hirose (広瀬みのり)

=== Former ===
- Manari Ōsaka (桜坂真愛)
- Soto Sakino (崎乃奏音)
- Rei Momose (百瀬怜)

== Discography ==
=== Studio albums ===
Title	Album details	Peak chart positions	
Title	Album details	Oricon	Hot
Tablature (タブラチュア)	Released: June 26, 2019; Label: Imperial Records; Formats: CD, digital download	18	37
Blue Cresc.	Released: February 2, 2022; Label: Imperial; Formats: CD, digital download	30	50
Inversion	Released: April 16, 2025; Label: Imperial; Formats: CD, digital download	29	—

=== Extended plays ===
Title	Album details	Peak chart positions	
Title	Album details	Oricon	Hot
#0F4C81	Released: December 23, 2020; Label: Imperial; Formats: CD, digital download	57	—
Aufheben (アウフヘーベン)	Released: September 20, 2023; Label: Imperial; Formats: CD, digital download	25	—

=== Singles ===
Title	Year	Peak chart positions	Album
Title	Year	Oricon	Album
"Finalegend"	2017	26	Tablature
"Haribote" (はりぼて)	2018	21	Tablature
"Tachypsychia / So Young" (タキサイキア/So Young)	2018	16	Tablature
"Zekkō Kyōshū / Amairo Hologram" (絶交郷愁/雨色ホログラム)	2018	15	Tablature
"Kūki to Ink / Wire" (空気とインク/Wire)	2019	17	Tablature
"2-ji no Parade" (2時のパレード)	2019	14	Blue Cresc.
"Suisei" (水生)	2020	19	Blue Cresc.
"Goku Heibon na Ao wa," (ごく平凡な青は、)	2020	17	Blue Cresc.
"Aoawase"	2021	15	Blue Cresc.
"Kilig Near" (キリグニア)	2022	22	Non-album singles
"Raku no Uwanuri" (楽の上塗り)	2023	18	Non-album singles
"Loopback Roll Trash" (ループバック・ロールトラッシュ)	2026	8	Non-album singles
"Opia"	2026	8	Non-album singles
