= Minami Momochi =

- Born: Fukuoka, Kyushu, Japan
- Genres: Anison; Japanese idol
- Occupations: DJ, Presenter
- Website: web.archive.org/web/20170521190602/http://en.momochi373.com/

Minami Momochi (Japanese: 桃知みなみ, Hepburn: Momochi Minami) is a Japanese DJ, idol and presenter, specialising in music from anime. She is notable for performing while dressed in a kigurumi style outfit, wearing an anime-style face mask while performing.

== Career ==
Momochi describes herself as "the world's first animetic idol", and wears an anime-style face mask on stage. She made her TV debut on Anison Live on TV Tokyo, and has since appeared on other TV shows including Quiz 30: Danketsu Seyo!, Tsukuriba and Goddotan. Her other roles include acting as a guide to Asagaya's Anime Street, working as an ambassador for Akihabara, hosting NicoNico Douga live broadcasts, and presenting professional wrestling matches. She was the in ring announcer for Tokyo Joshi Pro Wrestling, the women's division of DDT Pro-Wrestling. She left the promotion in 2017.

Momochi claims in an interview with Vice Japan that she looked like an anime character as a child and "used to have a bit of complex about it", but because she was complimented on her looks she decided to become an anime-like idol. She also says that made her own original anime series.

In 2014, Momochi successfully crowdfunded a campaign to become the star in a series of sci-fi ninja light novels, raising ¥1,852,300 ($17,000) on the website Green Funding. The novels, entitled Catch Me in Asagaya: Ninja Mangatronique, are written by Kasuga Yasunori and features a cover illustration by Techno Fuyuno.

== Influences ==
Momochi has stated that when DJing that she prefers to use anime songs that used fixed choreography so that she can dance with the crowd, examples being music from the series Pretty Cure and Love Live!. She has also said that musicians that have influenced her include hide from X Japan.
