= Steve Sashihara =

American business consultant and author (born 1957)

- Born: December 13, 1957
- Citizenship: American
- Education: Princeton University
- Occupations: President and CEO
- Years active: 1980–present
- Employer: Princeton Consultants

Steve Sashihara (born December 13, 1957) is an American business consultant and author who writes about optimization, business process improvement and IT-driven innovation. He is the president and CEO of Princeton Consultants, which he co-founded in 1980 after graduating from Princeton University.

== Work ==
Because optimization spans multiple technical fields, it can be labeled as mathematical optimization, advanced analytics, operations research or artificial intelligence.

Sashihara wrote that The Optimization Edge: Reinventing Decision Making to Maximize All Your Company’s Assets:

uses non-technical language to explain to executives what optimization is, the opportunities and challenges it poses, and why it should be an important item on their agendas.

Some industries have made extensive use of optimization software for specific business problems, such as supply chain optimization, transportation management, and price optimization for retailers. But Sashihara argues businesses have barely begun to tap the potential of the technology to be applied to any problem of limited resources — whether those resources are people, fuel, space on a shelf or in a truck, hours in the day, or dollars in the bank.

— The Optimization Edge, David F. Carr of Forbes

In the book and his practice, (Sashihara) shows clients how to squeeze every ounce of value from their company, even under the perfect storm conditions of the last few years.

— Consulting Magazine

Brian Deagon of Investor's Business Daily wrote:

Sashihara, president and CEO of Princeton Consultants, a consulting firm specializing in business optimization, says the approach employs mathematics and algorithms packaged with specialized software to sort and organize data. They use it to make recommendations faster and better than humans can.

Sashihara has contributed articles to The European Financial Review and M World, The Journal of the American Management Association. He has been interviewed for video news outlets such as CFO Studio and Soundview Executive Book Summaries. He is a frequent guest speaker on the subjects of optimization and Big Data at events conducted by the Association of Management Consulting Firms (AMCF), the Institute for Operations Research and the Management Sciences (INFORMS), IBM and other organizations and businesses. He is currently a director of AMCF and an officer of the INFORMS Roundtable.

== Bibliography ==
- Sashihara, Steve (April–May 2012). "From Big Data to Big Optimization: What Every Executive Needs to Know". The European Financial Review.
- Sashihara, Steve (Fall 2011). "Teaming Man & Machine to Optimize" (PDF). M World, the Journal of the American Management Association. 10 (3).
- Sashihara, Steve (2011). The Optimization Edge: Reinventing Decision Making to Maximize All Your Company's Assets. McGraw-Hill. p. 288. ISBN 978-0-07-174657-1.
