= Amefurasshi =

Japanese idol group

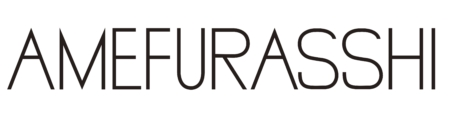

Background information
- Also known as: アメフラっシ (Amefurasshi) (2018–2021)
- Origin: Japan
- Genres: J-pop; pop
- Years active: 2018–2026
- Label: Stardust Records / Stardust Promotion
- Members: Aira; Yuduki Ichikawa; Hana Kojima; Moeka Suzuki
- Past members: Hikaru Ohira
- Website: www.amefurashi.jp

Amefurasshi (stylized in all caps) was a four-member Japanese idol girl group managed by Stardust Promotion. It was formed in 2018 with five former members of the idol group 3B Junior. The group belonged to Stardust Promotion's Star Planet division.

Amefurasshi debuted on November 3, 2018, at 3B Junior's final concert, titled Cell Division. The group's name was originally written using Japanese kana as アメフラっシ (Amefurasshi), but was changed to all-caps Latin script on November 19, 2021.

The group announced its disbandment on December 28, 2025, effective following their final solo concert on March 13, 2026.

== Members ==
All members are from Tokyo.

Name	Birthdate	Color	Notes
Aira (愛来)	December 8, 2002 (age 23)	Red	
Ichikawa Yuduki (市川優月)	November 2, 2003 (age 22)	Purple	
Kojima Hana (小島はな)	February 26, 2004 (age 22)	Blue	
Suzuki Moeka (鈴木萌花)	February 5, 2002 (age 24)	Yellow	

=== Former Members ===
Name	Birthdate	Color	Notes
Ohira Hikaru (大平ひかる)	July 23, 2002 (age 23)	Pink	Graduated on December 14, 2019

== Discography ==
=== Singles ===
Nº	Title	Release date	Comments	Charts
Nº	Title	Release date	Comments	JPN Oricon
1	"AMEFURASSHI LIMITED EDITION Vol. 1" (ミクロコスモス・マクロコスモス / 轟音)	December 29, 2018	Venue Limited	-
2	"AMEFURASSHI LIMITED EDITION Vol. 2" (グロウアップ・マイ・ハート / Dark Face)	January 14, 2019	Venue Limited	-
3	"AMEFURASSHI LIMITED EDITION Vol. 3" (Rain Makers!! / 明後日の方向へ走れ)	March 21, 2019	Venue Limited	-
4	"AMEFURASSHI LIMITED EDITION Vol. 4" (Over the rainbow / 差し出された手をあの時握ってたら運命変わってたかな？ / アダムスキーじいさん〜ハムとみかん〜)	May 18, 2019	Venue Limited	-
5	"AMEFURASSHI LIMITED EDITION Vol. 5" (ハイ・カラー・ラッシュ / フロムレター)	July 14, 2019	Venue Limited	-
6	"AMEFURASSHI LIMITED EDITION Vol. 6" (STATEMENT / 月並みファンタジー)	August 2, 2019	Venue Limited	-
7	"AMEFURASSHI LIMITED EDITION Vol.7 " (雑踏の中で / バカップルになりたい！)	May 17, 2020	Venue Limited	11
8	"BAD GIRL" (BAD GIRL / MICHI / Staring at You)	February 28, 2021	Venue Limited	13
9	"SENSITIVE" (SENSITIVE / Lucky Number / DROP DROP / DISCO-TRAIN)	November 2, 2021		7

=== Digital Singles ===
Nº	Title	Release date
1	"Metamorphose" (メタモルフォーズ)	July 1, 2020
2	"Pray for Rain ReMix by pepensow"	July 1, 2020
3	"BAD GIRL"	January 16, 2021
4	"Gradation" (グラデーション)	August 19, 2022
5	"Love is love"	October 6, 2022
6	"Fly Out"	January 1, 2023
7	"Batabata Morning"	March 10, 2023
8	"Blow Your Mind"	May 13, 2023
9	"ALIVE"	July 9, 2023
10	"SPIN"	October 30, 2023
11	"Colors"	December 23, 2023
12	"Sneaker's Delight (AMEFURASSHI version)"	January 26, 2024
13	"If I had held the hand that was offered to me back then, would my fate have been different? (AMEFURASSHI version)" (差し出された手をあの時握ってたら運命変わってたかな？ (AMEFURASSHI version))	March 1, 2024
14	"Secret"	March 16, 2024
15	"BAD GIRL (Acoustic version)"	May 3, 2024
16	"Eeny, meeny, miny, moe" (イニミニマニモ)	June 4, 2024

=== Albums ===
Nº	Title	Release date	Charts
Nº	Title	Release date	JPN Oricon
1	"Metamorphose"	September 8, 2020	-
2	"DROP"	May 24, 2022	13

=== Mini Albums ===
Nº	Title	Release date	Charts
Nº	Title	Release date	JPN Oricon
1	"Coffee"	May 16, 2023	-

=== Blu-ray ===
Nº	Title	Release date
1	"AMEFURASSHI Dancing in Ur Roooom!!!! 2020.7.18 limited live"	October 28, 2020
2	""Drop Tour 2022" Final Kanda Square Hall"	October 26, 2022
3	"FALL IN LOVE TOUR 2022"	April 3, 2023
