= ≒Joy =

Japanese idol girl group

- Origin: Japan
- Genre: J-pop
- Years active: 2022–present
- Label: Sacra Music
- Members: Jurī Aida; Konoa Amano; Ayumi Ichihara; Renon Esumi; Mitsuki Oshida; Aoi Onishi; Aimi Ozawa; Mai Takahashi; Riko Fujisawa; Yūka Murayama; Momoka Yamada; Arisu Yamano
- Past members: Moeka Fukuyama
- Website: nearly-equal-joy.jp

≒Joy (ニアリーイコールジョイ; pronounced "Nearly Equal Joy", stylized as ≒JOY), (Note: ≒ is used as an approximation sign in Japan, Taiwan, and South Korea.) is a Japanese idol girl group that formed in 2022 which features voice actors from the Yoyogi Animation Academy. The twelve-person group is produced by former AKB48 and HKT48 member Rino Sashihara and is the second sister group of =Love, after ≠Me.

== History ==
=== 2021–present: Formation and debut ===
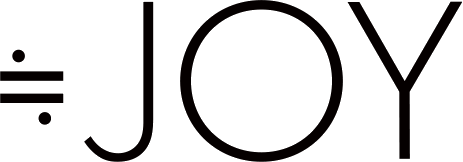
≒Joy logo

In October 2021, it was announced that Rino Sashihara would produce a third girl group.

On March 29, 2022, the group's name, ≒Joy, and the initial twelve member line-up were unveiled. On June 25, Aimi Ozawa joined the group as the thirteenth and final member. On July 2, their eponymous debut song was released on YouTube. On December 4, Moeka Fukuyama suspended her activities with the group to focus on her studies.

On March 29, 2023, Moeka Fukuyama left the group to continue her studies. On December 16, Aoi Onishi went on hiatus due to poor physical health.

On January 17, 2024, they released their debut EP, Kitto, Zettai, Zettai.

== Members ==
=== Current ===
- Jurii Aida (逢田珠里依)
- Konoa Amano (天野香乃愛)
- Ayumi Ichihara (市原愛弓)
- Renon Esumi (江角怜音)
- Mitsuki Ōshida (大信田美月)
- Aoi Ōnishi (大西葵)
- Aimi Ozawa (小澤愛実)
- Mai Takahashi (髙橋舞)
- Riko Fujisawa (藤沢莉子)
- Yūka Murayama (村山結香)
- Momoka Yamada (山田杏佳)
- Arisu Yamano (山野愛月)

=== Former ===
- Moeka Fukuyama (福山萌叶)

== Discography ==
=== Extended plays ===
| Title | Details | Peak chart positions | | Certifications |
| Title | Details | JPN | JPN Hot | Certifications |
|---|---|---|---|---|
| Kitto, Zettai, Zettai (きっと、絶対、絶対) | Released: January 17, 2024; Label: Sony Music; Formats: CD, digital download, streaming | 1 | 1 | RIAJ: Gold (phy.) |

=== Singles ===
| Title | Year | Peak chart positions | | Sales | Certifications | Albums |
| Title | Year | JPN | JPN Hot | Sales | Certifications | Albums |
|---|---|---|---|---|---|---|
| "Taiikukan Disco" (体育館ディスコ) | 2024 | 1 | 2 | JPN: 119,187 | RIAJ: Gold (phy.) | TBA |
| "Hatsukoi Cinderella" (初恋シンデレラ) | 2024 | 1 | 4 | JPN: 135,066 | RIAJ: Gold (phy.) | TBA |
| "Blue Hawaii Lemon" (ブルーハワイレモン) | 2025 | 2 | 4 | JPN: 163,333 | RIAJ: Platinum (phy.) | TBA |
| "Denwa Bango Oshiete!" (電話番号教えて!) | 2026 | 4 | 6 | JPN: 230,882 | RIAJ: Platinum (phy.) | TBA |
| "Summer Twintail" (サマーツインテール) | 2026 | 1 | 3 | JPN: 308,148 | RIAJ: Platinum (phy.) | TBA |
| "Rockstar-sama" (ロックスター様) | 2026 | — | 69 | | | TBA |
