= 2016 in Japanese music =

The year 2016 in Japanese music.

== Events ==
- 67th NHK Kōhaku Uta Gassen

== Number-ones ==
- Oricon number-one albums
- Oricon number-one singles
- Hot 100 number-one singles

== Best-sellers ==
=== Artists ===
The following is a list of the 5 best-selling music artists in Japan in 2016 by value of sales, including sales of records and of DVDs and Blu-rays, according to Oricon.

Rank	Artist	Value
1	Arashi	¥12.183 billion
2	Sandaime J Soul Brothers	¥8.256 billion
3	Nogizaka46	¥7.437 billion
4	AKB48	¥6.947 billion
5	Kanjani8	¥4.788 billion

=== Albums ===
The following is a list of the top 10 best-selling albums in Japan in 2016, according to Oricon.

Rank	Album	Artist	Copies
1	Are You Happy?	Arashi	747,115
2	The JSB Legacy	Sandaime J Soul Brothers	643,115
3	Fantôme	Hikaru Utada	569,963
4	Ano Hi, Ano Toki	Kazumasa Oda	412,496
5	High & Low Original Best Album	Various Artists	362,024
6	Your Name	Radwimps	351,811
7	Sorezore no Isu	Nogizaka46	331,848
8	Fuku no Oto	Masaharu Fukuyama	302,628
9	Cho Ikimonobakari ~Tennen Kinen Members’ BEST Selection~	Ikimonogakari	294,207
10	DEAR	Hey! Say! JUMP	292,426

=== Singles ===
==== Oricon ====
The following is a list of the top 10 best-selling singles in Japan in 2016, according to Oricon.

Rank	Single	Artist	Copies
1	"Tsubasa wa Iranai"	AKB48	1,519,387
2	"Kimi wa Melody"	AKB48	1,294,962
3	"Love Trip / Shiawase wo Wakenasai"	AKB48	1,213,660
4	"High Tension"	AKB48	1,202,533
5	"Sayonara no Imi"	Nogizaka46	910,811
6	"Hadashi de Summer"	Nogizaka46	851,229
7	"I Seek/Daylight"	Arashi	828,533
8	"Harujion ga Sakukoro"	Nogizaka46	828,315
9	"Fukkatsu Love"	Arashi	541,121
10	"Power of the Paradise"	Arashi	471,619

==== Billboard Japan ====
The following is a list of the top 10 best-selling singles in Japan in 2016, according to Billboard Japan's year-end Top Singles Sales chart.

Rank	Single	Artist	Copies
1	"Tsubasa wa Iranai"	AKB48	2,507,000
2	"Kimi wa Melody"	AKB48	1,482,000
3	"High Tension"	AKB48	1,438,000
4	"Love Trip / Shiawase wo Wakenasai"	AKB48	
5	"Sayonara no Imi"	Nogizaka46	918,000
6	"Hadashi de Summer"	Nogizaka46	
7	"I Seek/Daylight"	Arashi	
8	"Harujion ga Sakukoro"	Nogizaka46	
9	"Fukkatsu Love"	Arashi	
10	"Chicken Line"	SKE48	

== Awards ==
- 58th Japan Record Awards
- 2016 MTV Video Music Awards Japan

== Albums released ==
=== January ===
Date	Album	Artist	Genre	Labels
1	D×D×D	Shinee	J-pop, dance-pop	SM Entertainment, EMI Music Japan
6	Love Bebop	Misia		Ariola Japan
13	Ryōseibai	Gesu no Kiwami Otome		Unborde
13	Odore Balcony	Sawa		Bellwood Records
13	Sid All Singles Best	Sid		Ki/oon Music
13	Towa	Yuzu		Toy's Factory
20	Fake Metal Jacket	BiSH		Sub Trax
20	Winter of Love	Koda Kumi		Rhythm Zone
20	Miwa Ballad Collection: Graduation	miwa		Sony Music Entertainment Japan
20	The Last	Shikao Suga		Speedstar Records
27	Sea and the Darkness	Galileo Galilei		
27	Best Positive	Lecca		
27	Welcome to Ghost Hotel	Pentagon		Goemon Records
27	Yama-P	Tomohisa Yamashita		Sony Music Entertainment Japan
27	Depend on Me	VIXX	J-pop, dance-pop	Jellyfish Entertainment, CJ Victor Entertainment
29	Momento	Ayumi Tanaka Trio		AMP Music & Records

=== February ===
Date	Album	Artist	Genre	Labels
3	Made Series	Big Bang	Dance-pop, PBR&B, hip hop, acoustic	YG Entertainment, Avex Trax
3	Pow!/L.C.S.	FEMM		Avex Music Creative
3	Prism	Rei Yasuda		Sony Music Entertainment Japan
3	Vanilla Beans V	Vanilla Beans		Avex Trax
3	Yūjō Best	Yusuke		Sony Music Entertainment Japan
10	Butterflies	Bump of Chicken		
10	E.G. Smile: E-girls Best	E-girls		Rhythm Zone
10	Makkō Shōbu	Ken the 390		Rhythm Zone
10	The World's on Fire	Man with a Mission		Sony Music Entertainment Japan
10	Uta	Subaru Shibutani		Teichiku Records
10	Zard Forever Best: 25th Anniversary	Zard		B-Gram Records
12	Unfinished	Jungkyun (Bigflo)	Pop, dance	HO Company
17	Origin	Kana-Boon		Ki/oon Music

=== March ===
Date	Album	Artist	Genre	Labels
2	Yellow	Scandal	Pop rock / Alternative rock	Epic Records Japan
2	Liberty	Miliyah Kato		Mastersix Foundation
16	3	B1A4	Pop, dance	Pony Canyon
16	Spade 3	White Ash	Rock	VAP

=== April ===
Date	Album	Artist	Genre	Labels
1	Metal Resistance	Babymetal	J-pop, heavy metal	Toy's Factory
6	N.W.U	F.T. Island	Rock	Warner Music Japan
6	Cosmic Explorer	Perfume	J-pop	Universal Music Japan
6	Stroll and Roll	The Pillows		Delicious Label
13	High Heels	CLC	Pop, dance	Cube Entertainment Japan
27	Galaxy of 2PM	2PM	Pop, dance	Epic Records Japan

=== May ===
Date	Album	Artist	Genre	Labels
11	Heavenly	SpecialThanks		K.O.G.A Records
11	2020: T.M.Revolution All Time Best	T.M.Revolution		Epic Records Japan
11	Aki Kore: MTR&Y Tour 2015	Tamio Okuda		Ramen Curry Music Record
11	Renai Shōsetsu 2: Wakaba no Koro	Tomoyo Harada		Verve, Universal Music Japan
11	JaPo	Ua		Speedstar Records
18	May Dream	Aiko		Pony Canyon
18	Kidō: Start Up!	Ayaka Ōhashi		Lantis
18	Brand New Maid	Band-Maid		Nippon Crown
18	Eve	Cinema Staff		Pony Canyon
18	D-project with Zard	D-project		Giza Studio
18	Kōtetsu-jō no Kabaneri Original Soundtrack	Hiroyuki Sawano		
18	Wild Lips	Kōji Kikkawa		Warner Music Japan
18	S	Shouta Aoi		B-Green
18	Cold Disc	Straightener		Virgin Music

=== June ===
Date	Album	Artist	Genre	Labels
8	Aiiro Music	Indigo la End		Unborde
22	Lovers, Birthday, Music	Lego Big Morl		Oorong-sha

=== July ===
Date	Album	Artist	Genre	Labels
27	Sayonara Hitori	Taemin	Pop, dance	EMI Music Japan
27	Chamisma	CLC	Pop, dance	Cube Entertainment Japan

=== August ===
Date	Album	Artist	Genre	Labels
10	Mirage	Especia		Virgin Records
17	Zekkyō!	Pentagon		Goemon Records
17	Quest	White Ash	Rock	VAP

=== September ===
Date	Album	Artist	Genre	Labels
14	This Is Flower This Is Best	Flower		Sony Music Associated Records
21	Daydream	Aimer		Sony Music Entertainment Japan
21	N Album	KinKi Kids		Johnny's Entertainment
21	Life	Plenty		Headphone Music Label
21	Hallelujah	The Novembers		Hostess Entertainment
28	White Noise	TK		Sony Music Associated Records
28	Fantôme	Hikaru Utada		Virgin Records

=== October ===
Date	Album	Artist	Genre	Labels
5	Killer BiSH	BiSH		Avex Trax
12	Blue	Androp		Unborde
12	Girlz n' Effect	Happiness		Universal Sigma
12	P.Y.L	illion		Warner Music Japan
19	Euphoria	CNBLUE	Rock	Warner Music Japan
19	Frederism	Frederic		A-Sketch
19	Punky	Kaela Kimura		ELA
26	Snack Juju: Yoru no Request	Juju		Sony Music Associated Records
26	Now or Never	Nanase Aikawa		Motorod
26	Are You Happy	Arashi	Pop, R&B	J Storm

=== November ===
Day	Album	Artist	Genre	Labels
9	Exist!	Alexandros	Rock	Universal J / RX-Records
19	3 Pianos	Tanaka/Lindvall/Wallumrød	Jazz	Nakama Records
22	unPop	Charisma.com	Hip hop	Warner Music Japan
23	Dawn	AK-69	Hip hop	Def Jam Recordings
23	Cinema Songs	Hiroko Yakushimaru		Victor Entertainment
23	Greatest Hits 1991–2016: All Singles +	Maki Ohguro		Being Inc.
23	Ningen Kaika	Radwimps	Rock	Universal Music Japan
23	The Baddest: Collaboration	Toshinobu Kubota		Sony Music Entertainment Japan
30	Yano Sanmyaku	Akiko Yano		Victor Entertainment
30	Vektor E.P.	Cinema Staff		Pony Canyon

=== December ===
Day	Album	Artist	Genre	Labels
2	Film bleu	For Tracy Hyde	Dream pop	P-vine Records
6	Pay Money to My Pain	Pay Money to My Pain		VAP
7	24/7 (Twenty Four/Seven)	BtoB		Kiss Entertainment
7	Side by Side	Hilcrhyme		Universal Music Japan
7	Suolo	Husking Bee		Nippon Crown
7	Alive: Always in Your Heart	My Name		Universal Music Japan
7	The Best: 10 Years Story	Nao Matsushita		Epic Records Japan
7	PPAP	Pikotaro		Avex Trax
7	Dangerman	Seven		Victor Entertainment
7	Roll Up the Collectors	The Collectors		Nippon Columbia
14	Tokowaka no Kuni	Aoi Yūki		FlyingDog
14	Asunarou	Aqua Timez		Epic Records Japan
14	Ifudōdō: B.M.C.A.	Boys and Men		Virgin Music Japan
14	Urban Night	Cyntia		Indie Maker
14	Meshiagare no Gatling	Dish		Sony Music Entertainment Japan
14	Stand!!	Fujifabric		Sony Music Associated Records
14	Violet Cry	Garnidelia		Defstar Records
14	Namari Sora no Stargazer	Good Morning America		Nippon Columbia
14	No Shadow	Jun. K		Epic Records Japan
14	Shin Enka Meikyoku Collection 4: Kiyoshi no Nihon Zenkoku Uta no Wataridori	Kiyoshi Hikawa		Nippon Columbia
14	Lonely Night Magic Spell	Marie Ueda		Giza Studio
14	Life	Masayoshi Yamazaki		EMI Records Japan
14	Believer	Noriyuki Makihara		Sony Music Entertainment Japan
14	Existence	Nothing's Carved in Stone		Growing Up Inc. Dynamord Label
14	Journey Without a Map	Takuro		Pony Canyon
21	Pink Doll	Apink		Avex Trax
21	Another Side Memories: Precious Best II	Deen		Epic Records Japan
21	WWDBest: Denpa Ryōkō!	Dempagumi.inc		Toy's Factory
21	Doll Memories: Best of Doll Elements	Doll Elements		Dreamusic
21	S	Double S 301		Pony Canyon
21	Fes Best	Golden Bomber		Zany Zap
21	Veda	LM.C		Victor Entertainment
21	Neogene Creation	Nana Mizuki		King Records
21	SMAP 25 Years	SMAP		Victor Entertainment
21	Live for Live	Saori Hayami		Warner Bros. Home Entertainment
21	Maido! Ōkini!	Tacoyaki Rainbow		Avex Trax
21	Circle of Life	Tetsuya Kakihara		Lantis
21	U-KISS Japan Best Collection 2011–2016	U-KISS		Avex Trax
21	Caravan wa Philia wo Kanaderu	Wataru Hatano		DIVE II Entertainment
28	Live at Wembley	Babymetal		Toy's Factory
28	Encore	Back Number		Universal Sigma
28	The Mobb	MOBB		YGEX

== Debuting ==
=== Debuting groups ===
- 3B junior
- Batten Girls
- B.I.G
- Bis
- Chai
- Chelmico
- CLC
- CocoSori
- DYGL
- FEMM
- FlowBack
- Gang Parade
- Hiragana Keyakizaka46
- Hotshot
- iKon
- Keyakizaka46
- Musubizm
- OnePixcel
- Poppin'Party
- Pyxis
- Reol
- Rock A Japonica
- ShuuKaRen
- Tempalay
- The Sixth Lie
- The World Standard
- Yahyel
- Zenbu Kimi no Sei da.

=== Debuting soloists ===
- Aina Aiba
- Asaka
- Ayaka Sasaki
- Kanna Hashimoto
- Kyuhyun
- Manami Numakura
- Miku Itō
- Momo Asakura
- Momoka Ariyasu
- Mone Kamishiraishi
- Reina Ueda
- Rie Murakawa
- Taichi Mukai
- Uru

== Deaths ==
- February 10 – Asami Nagakiya, 30, Japanese steel pan player (suspected murder)
- April 3 – Kōji Wada, 42, Japanese singer and songwriter (pharyngeal cancer)

== See also ==
- 2016 in Japan
- 2016 in Japanese television
- List of Japanese films of 2016
