= Billboard Japan Year-End Hot 100 singles of 2017 =

Music sales chart

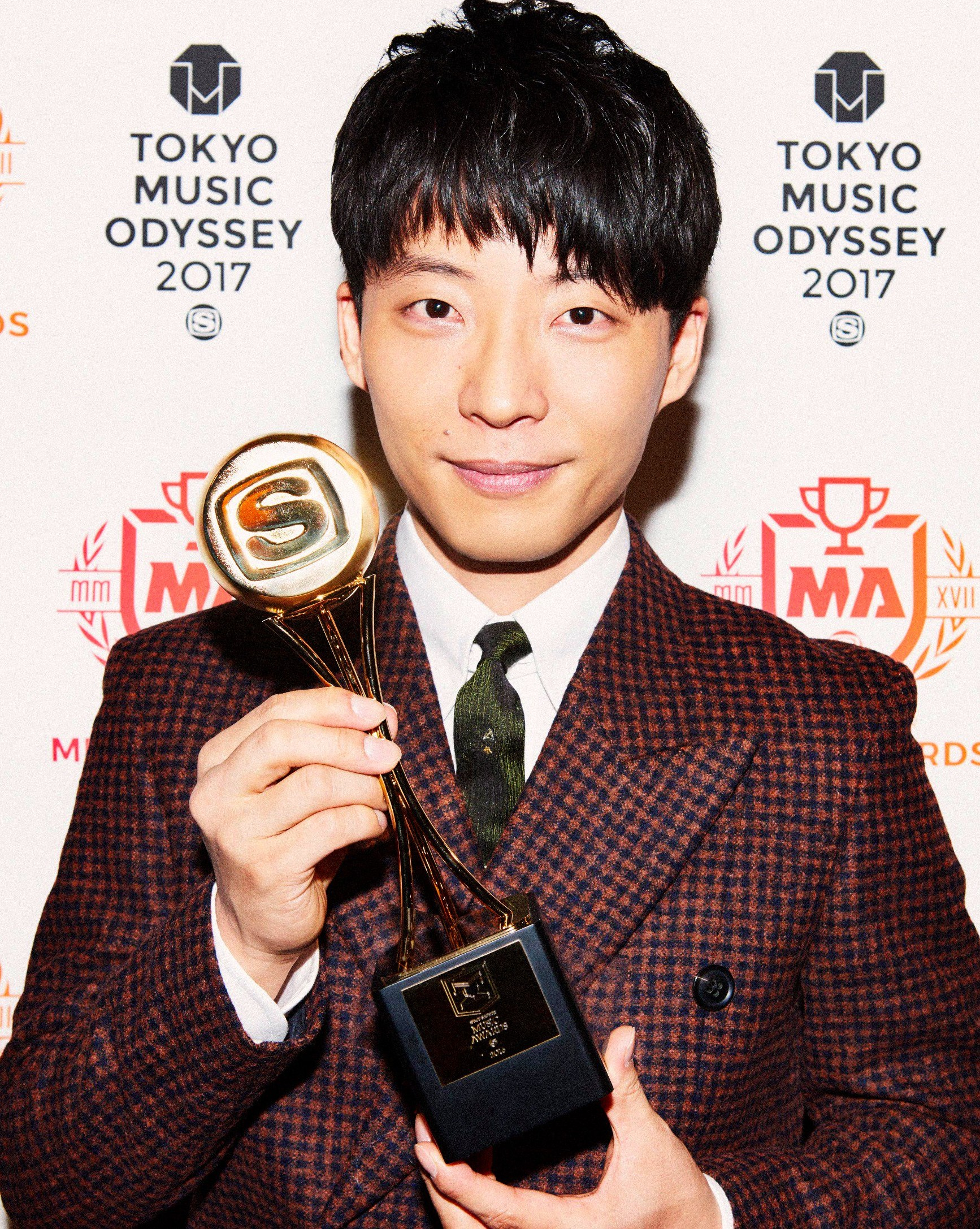
"Koi" by Gen Hoshino came in at number one this year, third place last year, making the top position of Billboard Japan Hot 100 during 2017.

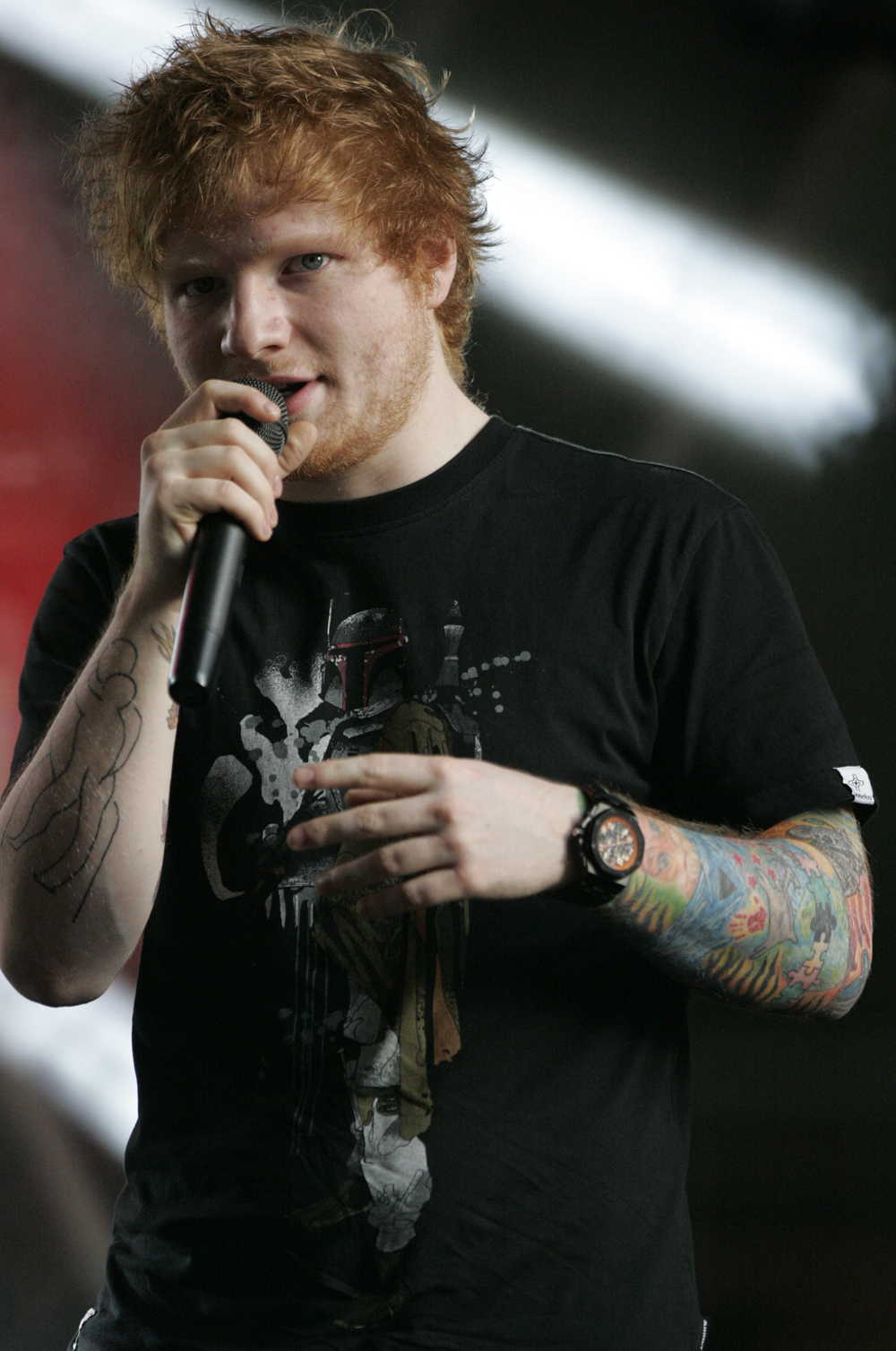
"Shape of You" by Ed Sheeran (pictured) came in at number two at the top position of the Billboard Japan Hot 100 during 2017.

The Billboard Japan Hot 100 is a chart that ranks the best-performing singles in Japan. The data is published by Billboard Japan magazine and compiled by Nielsen SoundScan, is based collectively on each single's weekly physical and digital sales, as well as airplay and streaming. At the end of a year, Billboard will publish an annual list of the 100 most successful songs throughout that year on the Hot 100 chart based on the information on performance. For 2017, the list was published on December 8.

== Year-end list ==
List of songs on Billboard Japan's 2017 Year-End Hot 100
No.	Title	Artist(s)
1	"Koi"	Gen Hoshino
2	"Shape of You"	Ed Sheeran
3	"Uchiage Hanabi"	Daoko X Kenshi Yonezu
4	"Fukyōwaon"	Keyakizaka46
5	"Futari Saison"	Keyakizaka46
6	"TT"	Twice
7	"Influencer"	Nogizaka 46
8	"PPAP (Pen-Pineapple-Apple-Pen)"	Pikotaro
9	"Zenzenzense"	Radwimps
10	"Silent Majority"	Keyakizaka46
11	"Dirty Work"	Austin Mahone
12	"Nigemizu"	Nogizaka 46
13	"Family Song"	Gen Hoshino
14	"Peace Sign"	Kenshi Yonezu
15	"Negaigoto no Mochigusare"	AKB48
16	"Itsuka Dekiru kara Kyō Dekiru"	Nogizaka 46
17	"Kaze ni Fukarete mo"	Keyakizaka46
18	"Tokyo Girl"	Perfume
19	"Stay Tune"	Suchmos
20	"Rain"	Sekai no Owari
21	"What Do You Mean?"	Justin Bieber
22	"Shoot Sign"	AKB48
23	"Signal"	Twice
24	"Sukinanda"	AKB48
25	"Happy End"	Back Number
26	"Orion"	Kenshi Yonezu
27	"Chi, Ase, Namida"	BTS
28	"Closer"	The Chainsmokers featuring Halsey
29	"Tsunagu"	Arashi
30	"Excite"	Daichi Miura
31	"One More Time"	Twice
32	"Happy?"	Sandaime J Soul Brothers from Exile Tribe
33	"I'll Be There"	Arashi
34	"Himawari"	Mr. Children
35	"Hikari no Atelier"	Mr. Children
36	"Sekai ni Hitotsu Dake no Hana"	SMAP
37	"Magic"	AAA
38	"24K Magic"	Bruno Mars
39	"11gatsu no Anklet"	AKB48
40	"Doors (Yūki no Kiseki)"	Arashi
41	"Sayonara no Imi"	Nogizaka 46
42	"Yattemiyō"	WANIMA
43	"Kiseki"	Greeeen
44	"Wherever You Are"	One Ok Rock
45	"Igai ni Mango"	SKE48
46	"Mita Koto mo Nai Keshiki"	Masaki Suda
47	"Destiny"	Che'Nelle
48	"Yōkoso Japari Park He"	Doubutsu Biscuits and PPP
49	"Senaka Goshi no Chance"	Kame to Yamapi
50	"Hanabi"	Mr. Children
51	"Something Just Like This"	The Chainsmokers and Coldplay
52	"Togetsukyou (Kimi Omofu)"	Migos
53	"Eine Kleine"	Kenshi Yonezu
54	"Ashita Mo"	Shishamo
55	"CQCQ"	Kamisama Bokuwa Kizuite Shimatta
56	"Like Ooh-Ahh"	Twice
57	"Pa"	Kana Nishino
58	"Uptown Funk"	Mark Ronson featuring Bruno Mars
59	"Give Me Love"	Hey! Say! JUMP
60	"Knock Knock"	Twice
61	"Over the Top"	Hey! Say! JUMP
62	"Loser"	Kenshi Yonezu
63	"Beauty and the Beast"	Ariana Grande and John Legend
64	"See You Again"	Wiz Khalifa featuring Charlie Puth
65	"Otona no Okite"	Doughnuts Hole
66	"Stay"	Zedd and Alessia Cara
67	"Boku Igai no Dareka"	NMB48
68	"Noroshi"	Kanjani 8
69	"Sun"	Gen Hoshino
70	"Charm"	WANIMA
71	"Cheer Up"	Twice
72	"Precious Girl	Hey! Say! JUMP
73	"Catch the Moment"	LiSA
74	"Koe"	Green Boys
75	"Just You And I"	Namie Amuro
76	"Non Fiction"	Ken Hirai
77	"Ribbon"	Bump of Chicken
78	"Tomo ni"	WANIMA
79	"Bagutte Iijan"	HKT48
80	"Kiss wa Matsushikanai no Deshōka?"	HKT48
81	"Dear Bride"	Kana Nishino
82	"We Are"	One Ok Rock
83	"Kanade"	Sukima Switch
84	"Welcome to Tokyo"	Sandaime J Soul Brothers from Exile Tribe
85	"Himawari no Yakusoku"	Motohiro Hata
86	"Kiseki no Hito"	Kanjani 8
87	"Nagurigaki Beat"	Kanjani 8
88	"Itteki no Eikyō"	Uverworld
89	"Seishun Dokei"	NGT48
90	"Sora"	Generations from Exile Tribe
91	"I Need Your Love"	Beverly
92	"Sorry"	Justin Bieber
93	"Good Life"	G-Eazy & Kehlani
94	"Arigatō"	SMAP
95	"Bang Bang Bang"	Big Bang
96	"My Boo"	Shota Shimizu
97	"Kono Yami Wo Terasu Hikari no Mukō ni"	Anly + Sukimaswitch=
98	"Sugar"	Maroon 5
99	"Wanted! Wanted!"	Mrs. Green Apple
100	"Shake It Off"	Taylor Swift
