= Are You Happy? =

Studio album by Arashi
- Released: October 26, 2016
- Recorded: 2015–2016
- Genres: Pop; R&B
- Length: 73:03 (Regular Edition); 69:35 (Limited Edition)
- Languages: Japanese; English
- Label: J Storm
- Producer: Julie K.

Arashi chronology
Japonism (2015)	Are You Happy? (2016)	Untitled (2017)

Singles from Are You Happy?
- 1. "Ai o Sakebe" Released: September 2, 2015; 2. "Fukkatsu Love" Released: February 24, 2016; 3. "I Seek/Daylight" Released: May 18, 2016

Are You Happy? is the fifteenth studio album of the Japanese idol group Arashi. The album was released on October 26, 2016 under their record label J Storm in two editions: a first press/limited edition and a regular edition. The regular edition comes with a 36-page lyrics booklet and the limited edition comes with an 80-page photo lyrics and a bonus DVD with the music video and making-of for "Don't You Get It?". The album sold over 636,000 copies in its first week and topped the Oricon charts. With more than 720,000 copies sold, the album was certified for Triple Platinum by the Recording Industry Association of Japan (RIAJ). It was released digitally on February 7, 2020.

== Album information ==
The limited edition contains a CD with sixteen tracks and the regular edition contains a CD with seventeen tracks. The limited edition comes with an 80-page photo lyrics booklet and a bonus DVD with the music video and making of for "Don't You Get It?", while the regular edition comes with a 36-page lyrics booklet and a bonus track. The album jacket cover for both editions are different.

=== Songs ===
"Are You Happy?" includes three of the group's previously released singles: "Ai o Sakebe", "Fukkatsu Love", and "I Seek/Daylight". This album also includes nine new songs plus five of each member's solo songs. In addition to their solo songs, each of the members were in charge of an original Arashi song using the "Happy" theme.

"Ai o Sakebe" was used as the background song for the Recruit Zexy commercial and "Fukkatsu Love" was used as the background song for the NTT DoCoMo d hits commercial. "I seek" was used as the theme song for the drama Sekai Ichi Muzukashii Koi starring Arashi member Satoshi Ohno, and "Daylight" was used as the theme song for the drama 99.9 Keiji Senmon Bengoshi starring Arashi member Jun Matsumoto. "Don't You Get It?" was used as the background song for Hitachi's robot cleaner commercial, "Minimaru".

== Promotion ==
To support their new album, Arashi performed a live tour, ARASHI LIVE TOUR 2016-2017 Are You Happy?, performing at all the major dome stadiums in Japan. They had 18 performances beginning on November 11 at the Sapporo Dome, followed by Tokyo Dome on November 19, Kyocera Osaka Dome on December 2, Nagoya Dome on December 16, Tokyo Dome on December 26, 2016, and Fukuoka Dome on January 6, 2017.

On November 9, the band announced an Album x 5-Dome Tour Collaboration Project, the "ARASHI Are You Happy? campaign", to commemorate the release of the album and the start of their dome tour. A smartphone only promotion site opened on November 11, 9:00 (JST) where eighteen original "Are You Happy?" wallpapers were made available to download for customers who purchased the regular edition of their album. A user code can be found on the cover strip of the regular edition. To access the wallpapers, customers entered the user code into the promotion site where they could pick up to three wallpapers to download.

== Track listing ==
CD
No.	Title	Lyrics	Music	Arrangement	Length
1.	"Drive" (supervised by Jun Matsumoto)	Macoto56	Jeremy Hammond	Hammond	4:23
2.	"I Seek"	ASIL	AKJ & ASIL	Tomoki Ishizuka	4:45
3.	"Ups and Downs"	Yoshiyasu Ichikawa	Joe Lawrence; Trevor Ingram	pieni tonttu	4:29
4.	"Seishun Boogie" (青春ブギ, supervised by Masaki Aiba)	paddy	Soul-273	ha-j	4:08
5.	"Sunshine" (Sho Sakurai solo)	kosuke; AKIRA; Sho Sakurai	Tommy Clint	Ishizuka	3:28
6.	"Fukkatsu Love" (復活LOVE)	Mariya Takeuchi	Tatsuro Yamashita	Yamashita	4:54
7.	"Amore" (Masaki Aiba solo)	eltvo	eltvo	eltvo	4:01
8.	"Bad Boy" (Satoshi Ohno solo)	Harajuku Kidz	Harajuku Kidz	Harajuku Kidz	4:09
9.	"Wonder-Love" (supervised by Kazunari Ninomiya)	KOU&	Erik Lidbom; Jon Hällgren	Lidbom; Hällgren	3:35
10.	"Mata Kyou to Onaji Asu ga Kuru" (また今日と同じ明日が来る, Kazunari Ninomiya solo)	Fox.i.e; Kazunari Ninomiya	Fox.i.e	Fox.i.e; A-bee	3:50
11.	"Daylight"	stereograph; Sakurai	Simon Janlov; wonder note	Hirofumi Sasaki	4:51
12.	"Ai o Sakebe" (愛を叫べ)	100+	100+	Sasaki	4:41
13.	"Baby Blue" (Jun Matsumoto solo)	100+	100+	Sasaki	4:16
14.	"Miles Away" (supervised by Satoshi Ohno)	100+	R.P.P	metropolitan digital clique	5:02
15.	"To My Homies" (supervised by Sakurai Sho)	BASI; Sakurai	Insist	Insist	4:55
16.	"Don't You Get It"	KOU&	Didrik Thott; Christian Fast; Henrik Nordenback	Taku Yoshioka; Sasaki	4:05
17.	"Two to Tango" (bonus track, regular edition only)	Harajuku Kidz; Sakurai	Kevin Charge; Andreas Öberg; Harajuku Kidz	metropolitan digital clique	3:23
Total length:					73:03

DVD
No.	Title	Length
1.	"Don't You Get It (video clip + making)" (「Don't You Get It」ビデオ･クリップ+メイキング)

== Chart performance ==
"Are You Happy?" debuted at number one on the Oricon daily album chart selling 315,741 copies upon its release and selling 636,619 copies by the end of the week, topping the Oricon weekly album chart. The album sold 56,214 copies in its second week and ranked second on the weekly album chart. The album stayed in the top ten for four consecutive weeks. With more than 720,000 copies sold, "Are You Happy?" was certified for Triple Platinum by RIAJ.

== Charts and certifications ==
=== Weekly charts ===
Chart (2016)	Peak position
Japan (Oricon Albums Chart)	1
Japan (Billboard Japan Hot Albums)	1
Japan (Billboard Japan Top Album Sales)	1
South Korea (Gaon Album Chart)	43
South Korea (Gaon International Album Chart)	4

Chart (2017)	Peak position
Japan (Oricon Albums Chart)	16
Japan (Billboard Japan Hot Albums)	12
Japan (Billboard Japan Top Album Sales)	13
South Korea (Gaon International Album Chart)	70
Taiwan (G-Music East Asian Chart) (Note: Position was taken from 2017 week 1.)	3

=== Year-end charts ===
Chart (2016)	Peak position
Japan (Oricon Albums Chart)	1
Japan (Billboard Japan Hot Albums)	4
Japan (Billboard Japan Top Albums Sales)	1

=== Sales and certifications ===
Region	Certification	Certified units/sales
Japan (RIAJ)	3× Platinum	750,000^{^}
^{^} Shipments figures based on certification alone.

== Awards ==
- The album was listed as one of the Best 5 Albums for the 31st Japan Gold Disc Awards.

== Release history ==
Country	Release date	Label	Format	Catalog
Japan	October 26, 2016	J Storm	CD+DVD	JACA-5625-5626
Japan	October 26, 2016	J Storm	CD	JACA-5627
South Korea	November 16, 2016	S.M. Entertainment	CD+DVD	SMKJT0718/B
South Korea	November 16, 2016	S.M. Entertainment	CD	SMKJT0719
Taiwan	November 18, 2016	Avex Asia	CD+DVD	JAJCD26030/A
Taiwan	November 18, 2016	Avex Asia	CD	JAJCD26030
