= Untitled (Arashi album) =

Studio album by Arashi
- Released: October 18, 2017
- Recorded: 2016–2017
- Length: 61:27
- Language: Japanese; English
- Label: J Storm

Arashi chronology
| Are You Happy? (2016) | Untitled (2017) | 5x20 All the Best!! 1999–2019 (2019) |

Alternative cover
- Limited edition cover

Singles from Untitled
- 1. "Power of the Paradise" Released: September 14, 2016; 2. "I'll Be There" Released: April 19, 2017; 3. "Tsunagu" Released: June 28, 2017

Untitled (stylized as 「untitled」) is the sixteenth studio album by the Japanese idol group Arashi. The album was released on October 18, 2017 under their record label J Storm in two editions: a first press/limited edition and a regular edition. With more than 750,000 copies sold, the album was certified Triple Platinum by the Recording Industry Association of Japan (RIAJ). It was released digitally on February 7, 2020.

== Album information ==
The album was purposely titled to suggest that it is "unfinished". Besides a CD of 13 tracks, the first-run limited edition also contains a DVD of the music video and making-of for the album's lead song "Mikan" and 80-page lyrics photo booklet with special packaging. The regular edition also includes 4 unit songs, a bonus track, and a 36-page lyrics booklet.

=== Songs ===
Untitled includes three of the group's previously released singles: "Power of the Paradise", "I'll Be There", and "Tsunagu".

"Power of the Paradise" was used as the theme song for NTV's news coverage of the 2016 Summer Olympics, where Sho Sakurai served as the main newscaster. "I'll Be There" was used as the theme song for the television drama Kizoku Tantei starring Masaki Aiba. "Tsunagu" was used as the theme song for the film Mumon: The Land of Stealth starring Satoshi Ohno.

Arashi also made their first suite with "Song for You". It was created by incorporating melodies from various genres into a song of over ten minutes. It is said to represent the group's past, present, and future. The song "Mikan" (｢未完｣; lit. "Incomplete") was also said to epitomize the album title and contain elements of wa, digital, classical, and hip hop music. Unlike the group's previous albums, Untitled does not contain solo songs, but unit songs sung by either duos or trios.

The music videos use "duality", as in "light and shadow" and "virtual images and real images", as their theme. Unlike previously released music videos, the scenes of the group appearing together are few and are mostly solo shots.

== Promotion ==
To support the album, Arashi performed a live tour called Arashi Live Tour 2017-2018 Untitled. They performed at all the major dome stadiums in Japan: November 11 to 13 at the Sapporo Dome, followed by Tokyo Dome on December 1 to 3 and December 24 to 26, Fukuoka Dome from December 8 to 10, Nagoya Dome for December 15 to 17, and Osaka City Dome from January 12 to 14.

== Chart performance ==
Untitled debuted at number one on the Oricon daily albums chart selling 352,302 copies upon its release and 165,248 copies on its second day. Billboard Japan recorded 522,813 copies sold from October 16–18, 2017. The album sold over 668,000 copies in its first week and topped the Oricon weekly albums chart. The album debuted at number one on the Billboard Japan's top single sales chart selling 690,617 copies in its first week. It debuted at number one on Billboard Japan's Hot Albums chart. The album sold 49,343 copies in its second week.

In October 2017, Untitled was certified Triple Platinum by the RIAJ.

== Track listing ==
CD 1
| No. | Title | Lyrics | Music | Arrangement | Length |
|---|---|---|---|---|---|
| 1. | "Green Light" | Akira; June | Christofer Erixon; Josef Melin | Tomoki Ishizuka | 4:16 |
| 2. | "Tsunagu" (つなぐ "Connect") | Paddy | Peter Nord; Kevin Borg | Nord; Hirofumi Sasaki | 4:08 |
| 3. | "Mikan" (｢未完｣ "Incomplete") | June; Sho Sakurai | Melin | Sasaki | 3:26 |
| 4. | "Sugar" | Hikari | IiSAK; Hikari | IiSAK | 3:52 |
| 5. | "Power of the Paradise" | Paddy | Nobby | Ha-j | 4:38 |
| 6. | "Ari no Mama de" (ありのままで "As It Is") | Atsushi Shimada; MiNE | Erixon; Joakim Björnberg; Shimada | Shimada | 3:28 |
| 7. | "Fūun" (風雲 "Winds and Clouds") | Iroco-Star | Erik Lidbom; Simon Janlöv | Metropolitan Digital Clique | 3:29 |
| 8. | "I'll Be There" | Goro.T | Figge Boström; Kōta Sahara | Sahara; Metropolitan Digital Clique | 4:11 |
| 9. | "Hōyō" (抱擁 "Hug") | Ori; Sakurai | Victor Sågfors; Peter Boyes; Caroline Gustavsson | Taku Yoshioka | 3:45 |
| 10. | "Pray" | Iroco-Star; Yūko Muramatsu | Lidbom; Wonder Note | Lidbom | 5:03 |
| 11. | "Hikari" (光 "Light") | Komei Kobayashi; Sakurai | Shingo Kubota; Koudai Iwatsubo; Kumi Sasaki | Kubota | 5:00 |
| 12. | "Kanata e" (彼方へ "To the Other Side") | Rucca | Takarot; IiSAK | Takarot; Eiji Kawai | 4:36 |
| 13. | "Song for You" | Yoshiyasu Ichikawa | Janlöv; Wonder Note; Kevin Charge; Lidbom; Shirose; Kousuke Yamashita | Yamashita | 11:29 |
| Total length: | | | | | 61:27 |

CD 2 – Regular edition
| No. | Title | Lyrics | Music | Arrangement | Length |
|---|---|---|---|---|---|
| 1. | "Bazuri Night" (バズりNIGHT "Buzzing Night", Aiba, Ohno, Sakurai trio song) | Shinya Tada | A. K. Janeway; Tada | Janeway | 3:57 |
| 2. | "Yoru no Kage" (夜の影 "Night's Shadow", Matsumoto, Ninomiya, Ohno trio song) | Funk Uchino | MLC; Soma Genda | Genda; Captain B | 3:46 |
| 3. | "UB" (Aiba and Ninomiya duo song) | Asil | Samuel Waermö; Stefan Ekstedt; Didrik Thott | Sasaki | 4:13 |
| 4. | "Come Back" (Matsumoto and Sakurai duo song) | Nao Tanaka; Sakurai | Tanaka | Tanaka | 3:52 |
| 5. | "Kanpai Song" (カンパイ･ソング; Bonus track) | Halmelnuts | Kehn Mind | Kawai | 4:34 |
| Total length: | | | | | 20:24 |

DVD – Limited edition
| No. | Title | Lyrics | Music | Arrangement | Length |
|---|---|---|---|---|---|
| 1. | "Mikan (video clip + special making-of)" ((｢未完｣ (ビデオ･クリップ+スペシャル･メイキング) | June; Sakurai | Melin | Sasaki |

== Charts and certifications ==
=== Weekly charts ===
Weekly chart performance for Untitled
| Chart (2017) | Peak position |
|---|---|
| Japan (Oricon Albums Chart) | 1 |
| Japan (Billboard Japan Hot Albums) | 1 |
| Japan (Billboard Japan Top Album Sales) | 1 |
| South Korea (Gaon Album Chart) | 31 |
| South Korea (Gaon International Album Chart) | 1 |

=== Year-end charts ===
Year-end chart performance for Untitled
| Chart (2017) | Peak position |
|---|---|
| Japan (Oricon Albums Chart) | 3 |
| Japan (Billboard Japan Hot Albums) | 4 |
| Japan (Billboard Japan Top Albums Sales) | 3 |

=== Certifications and sales ===
Certifications and sales for Untitled
| Region | Certification | Certified units/sales |
|---|---|---|
| Japan (RIAJ) | 3× Platinum | 774,993 |

== Awards ==
- Untitled was listed as one of the Best 5 Albums for the 32nd Japan Gold Disc Awards.

== Release history ==
Release history and formats for Untitled
| Country | Release date | Label | Format | Catalog |
|---|---|---|---|---|
| Japan | October 18, 2017 | J Storm | CD+DVD | JACA-5683-5684 |
| Japan | October 18, 2017 | J Storm | 2CD | JACA-5685-5686 |
| South Korea | November 8, 2017 | SM Entertainment | CD+DVD | |
| South Korea | November 8, 2017 | SM Entertainment | 2CD | |
| Taiwan | November 24, 2017 | Avex Taiwan | CD+DVD | JAJCD26033/A |
| Taiwan | November 24, 2017 | Avex Taiwan | 2CD | JAJCD26033/4 |
