= OLest =

EP by Charisma.com
- Released: July 8, 2015
- Recorded: 2015
- Genre: electropop, hip hop
- Length: 30:44
- Language: Japanese
- Label: Warner Music Japan

Charisma.com chronology
Distopping (2014)	OLest (2015)

Singles from OLest
- 1. "Kongara Girl" Released: April 15, 2015; 2. "Otsubone Rock" Released: June 5, 2015

OLest is the second extended play by Japanese musical group Charisma.com. It was released on July 8, 2015, as their first release through Warner Music Japan.

== Background and development ==
After the release of the group's debut studio album Distopping in June 2014, the group performed a five city national tour of Japan, OL Joker. In early August, Charisma.com collaborated with dance troupe Tempura Kidz, who had been the opening act of their tour, to release the digital single "Mirra Killer". In early 2015, Charisma.com performed the theme song for the live action film adaptation of Tomohiro Koizumi's manga Shinda Me o Shita Shōnen, entitled "Tongari Young".

== Writing and production ==
The album's title is a neologism meaning "most office lady." The extended play features similar themes to the group's first two releases, where Itsuka writes material inspired by the events of her life as an office lady, however Itsuka plans for OLest to be the last release of the group to be so strongly office lady-themed.

== Promotion and release ==
In April 2015, the album's first digital single, "Kongara Girl", was released. The song was used to promote Tangle Teezer-brand hair brushes, and was the group's last release on the independent label Lastrum. The song received minor radio airplay, reaching number 57 on the Billboard Japan Adult Contemporary Airplay chart.

On June 5, the group released the music video for "Otsubone Rock", the leading promotional track from OLest. After several weeks of radio play, the song peaked at number 33 on the Billboard Japan Hot 100 chart.

The iTunes edition of the extended play featured a bonus track, a remix of "Iinazuke Blue", the leading track from their first studio album Distopping (2014). The Tower Records Japan online edition of the album featured a bonus CD with a remix of the song "Hate" from the group's extended play Ai Ai Syndrome (2013), remixed by OMSB from the hip-hop group Simi Lab. Charisma.com performed on many television programs to promote the album, including Ongaku no Hi and Count Down TV on June 27, Music Japan on June 28 and Premium Melodix! on July 6 to perform "Otsubone Rock", The group also appeared for two weeks on Kansai Television's Mujack on June 26 and June 3, and on Nippon Television's Buzzrhythm on June 10.

The second promotional track from the extended play was "Around 30 Dreaming", which was chosen as the theme song for the second season of the LaLa TV drama Watashi-tachi ga Propose Sarenai no ni wa, Hyaku Ichi no Riyū ga Atte da na. The first episode was broadcast on September 2, 2015. On August 26, a lyric video was uploaded to YouTube to promote the song.

In October the group will perform a four-date solo-billed tour of Japan, performing in Osaka, Nagoya, Fukuoka and Tokyo.

== Critical reception ==
Fumiaki Amano of Skream! praised Itsuka's ability to be simultaneously angry and calm, and felt that OLest showed Itsuka at her most kind. She praised songs such as the "gentle pop" "Around Thirty Dreamin'" for their emotion.

== Track listing ==
No.	Title	Lyrics	Music	Length
1.	"Yare yo." (やれよ。, "Do It.")	Itsuka	Itsuka, Takashi Morio	3:52
2.	"Otsubone Rock" (お局ロック, "Court Woman Rock")	Itsuka	Itsuka, Masaru Iwabuchi	4:17
3.	"Mamemame Boy Gasatsu Girl" (マメマメBOYがさつGIRL, "Hard Working Boy, Crude Girl")	Itsuka	Itsuka, The Lasttrak (TakachenCo)	2:53
4.	"Around 30 Dreaming" (アラサードリーミン Arasā Dorīmin)	Itsuka	Itsuka, Nagomu Tamaki	4:22
5.	"Darii Dararin" (ダリぃだらりん)	Itsuka	Itsuka, Koji Tsukada	3:00
6.	"Kongara Girl" (こんがらガール, "Tangled Girl")	Itsuka	Itsuka, Chrysanthemum Bridge	4:28
7.	"Chōzetsu ni Mune ga Itandeiru Anata no Jōshi" (超絶に胸が痛んでいるあなたの上司, "Your Boss with Extreme Heartache")	Itsuka	Itsuka, Mr. Bipolar	4:29
8.	"Tasogare Kakui" (黄昏各位, "All the Twilights")	Itsuka	Itsuka, Kikucchan	3:19
Total length:				30:44

iTunes bonus track
No.	Title	Lyrics	Music	Length
9.	"Iinazuke Blue (Luuxoor Hardest Mix)" (イイナヅケブルー, "Fiancé Blue")	Itsuka	Itsuka, Morio	3:55
Total length:				34:39

== Charts ==
Chart (2015)	Peak position
Japan Oricon daily albums	18
Japan Oricon weekly albums	31

=== Sales ===
Chart	Amount
Oricon physical sales	5,000

== Release history ==
Region	Date	Format	Distributing Label	Catalogue codes
Japan	July 8, 2015	CD, digital download	Warner Music Japan	WPCL-12163
Japan	July 25, 2015	Rental CD	Warner Music Japan	WPCL-12163
