= Sawa (singer) =

Japanese singer-songwriter and DJ

Sawa サワ
- Also known as: DJ Wasa
- Born: Sawa Kouchi (河内 沙和); 6 November 1983 (age 42)
- Origin: Okayama, Japan
- Genres: Pop, electropop, trance, intelligent dance
- Occupations: Singer, songwriter, producer, DJ
- Years active: 2002-present
- Labels: Cyclops; Wint; Epic Records Japan; Bellwood Records; SpacyRecords
- Website: http://www.sa-world.net/

Sawa Kouchi (河内 沙和, Kouchi Sawa; born 6 November 1983), known mononymously as SAWA, is a Japanese singer-songwriter, music producer, and DJ. In 2009, she signed onto Sony Music Entertainment Japan and joined its subsidiary, Epic Records Japan. In 2012, she joined Bellwood Records for the release of her sixth mini-album, Soprano Rain (ソプラノレイン).

She has composed commercial songs and jingles for numerous companies, including LINE for their "LINE Pay" and "LINE Shopping" services, Alinamin Pharmaceuticals, and SMBC Consumer Finance for their consumer loan service Promise. She has also acted as music producer for a number of artists, including Especia, Nozomi Sasaki, and Koto.

== Biography ==
In 2002, Kouchi debuted as a member of Jack Knife, a tap dancing girl group managed by Stardust Promotion. The group received dance tutelage from choreographer Kazunori Tamano. Jack Knife would eventually disband in early 2004.

In 2008, Kouchi would take up the stage name Sawa for her singing career. As Sawa, she debuted on the independent label Cyclops and released two mini-albums. The first mini-album, Colors, was produced by Takeshi Hanzawa from FreeTEMPO and was released on 18 June 2008. Her second mini-album, Time & Space, was produced by a number of musicians, including Ram Rider, A Hundred Birds, and Kentaro Takizawa. It was released on 10 December 2008 on CD and on iTunes, where it topped the iTunes Music Store's dance chart in Japan. The song "Discovery" was used on the soundtrack and in promotional material for the PlayStation Portable software Nippon no Asoko de.

The following year, Sawa made her major label debut with Epic Records Japan. Her first release with the label, a mini-album titled I Can Fly, was released on 22 July 2009. Songs from I Can Fly featured commercial tie-ins to MBS TV fashion program "Dress" and a summer commercial for Honda. The mini-album peaked at No. 145 on the Oricon charts and charted for one week. A second mini-album, Swimming Dancing, was released on 25 November 2009, with the first two tracks on the album produced by Taku Takahashi. The album reached a peak position of No. 210 on the Oricon, charting for one week. A third mini-album titled Ai ni Ikuyo (あいにいくよ) was released on 7 April 2010 and saw Sawa working with producers Hisashi Nawata, Jazzin' park, and Junya Ookubo Zyun (ANA), as well as reuniting with producer Ram Rider. Sawa's first full-length studio album Welcome to Sa-World was released on 7 July 2010. The album featured several producers such as Motonari Murakawa, TeddyLoid, and Ryuichiro Yamaki, with seven of the album's seventeen tracks produced by Sawa herself. The album would be followed by two digital download-only singles: "Mysterious Zone" in December 2010 and "Good Day Sunshine" in May 2012. Both songs would later be featured on Sawa's sixth mini-album Soprano Rain, which was released on 19 December 2012. The first five tracks were produced by Sawa herself. The title track was used in the NHK TV show Minna no Uta.

Sawa has composed and produced music for various artists throughout her career. In 2011, she produced "Colorful World" for Nozomi Sasaki's first studio album, Nozomi Collection. The song would also receive a commercial tie-in for Kao Liese's Prettia line of hair dye, with the commercials starring Sasaki herself. In 2013, she wrote and composed "Midnight Confusion" for Especia, a revivalist Japanese idol girl group inspired by music from the 1980s and 1990s. In 2015, she produced "Juliet no Paradox" for Yufu Terashima, former member of BiS, and "Giza Giza no Lonely Night" for Koto, a singer and idol specializing in electronic dance music. Koto and Sawa would continue to collaborate afterward, releasing a collaboration single entitled "Kotosawa Sisters" that would be distributed at a live concert held to celebrate Koto's 17th birthday on September 25 that same year. Koto would later appear on an interlude on Sawa's 2017 mini-album Ijippari Mermaid.

== Discography ==
=== Albums ===
1. Welcome to Sa-World (7 July 2010)
2. Kōuki Aisare Stance (高貴愛されスタンス) (14 March 2018)
3. Bijin Hakumei Aege Umi (美人薄命エーゲ海) (7 April 2019)
4. Tenshoku Katsudō (転職活動) (4 November 2020)
5. Tadashī Jun'ōsei (正しい順応性) (8 July 2024)

==== Mini-albums ====
1. Colors (18 June 2008)
2. Time & Space (10 December 2008)
3. I Can Fly (22 July 2009)
4. Swimming Dancing (25 November 2009)
5. Ai ni Ikuyo (あいにいくよ) (7 April 2010)
6. Soprano Rain (ソプラノレイン) (19 December 2012)
7. RingaRinga (24 September 2014)
8. Odore Balcony (踊れバルコニー) (13 January 2016)
9. Ijippari Mermaid (いじっぱりマーメイド) (14 February 2017)

=== Song appearances ===
- Gekkan Probowler's fourth album eRETRO

2. "SUMMER OF LOVE"

- WIRED CAFE Music Recommendation Precious

8. "Lovefool"

- Suneohair's sixth album Birthday

9. "Yuganda Futari (歪んだ二人; Distorded Us)"

- Juicy Fruits

2. "Raspberry Dream"

- Judy and Mary 15th Anniversary Tribute Album

5. "RADIO"

- Sound Around's second album Every with You

4. "Every with You" feat. SAWA

- GUNDAM 30th CUSTOM

8. "Ima wa Oyasumi (いまはおやすみ; It's time to say good night now)"

- Seaside Town

1. "Samba De Mar"

- RYUKYUDISKO's fourth album Pleasure

4. "SPLASH☆" feat. SAWA

- Kentaro Takizawa's fourth album Big Room

9. "Another Landscape" feat. SAWA
11. "Keep Love Together" feat. The Big Room Family a.k.a. Mika Arisaka and Ryohei with Sawa, Mika Sawabe

- Anan Ryoko's debut album Another Beginning

12. "Dreaming" feat. SAWA
16. "Dreaming" feat. SAWA -Japanese Ver.-

- House Nation 3rd Anniversary

19. "Swimming Dancing"

- MemorieS ~Goodbye and Hello~

5. "Caught in a Strawberry Field (いちご畑でつかまえて)"
