= Kamiwaza Wanda =

Japanese media franchise

- Key visual of the series

カミワザ・ワンダ
- Created by: Takara Tomy
- Manga

Kamiwaza Wanda: Fushigina Ikiki no Promin Monogatari
- Written by: Maeda-kun
- Published by: Shogakukan
- Magazine: Bessatsu CoroCoro Comic
- Original run: February 29, 2016 – December 29, 2016
- Manga
- Written by: Chihiro Okitsune
- Published by: Shogakukan
- Magazine: CoroCoro Ichiban
- Original run: March 19, 2016 – March 21, 2017
- Volumes: 3
- Anime television series
- Directed by: Mitsuo Hashimoto
- Written by: Katsumi Hasegawa
- Music by: Hideyuki Fukasawa; Takatsugu Wakabayashi
- Studio: TMS Entertainment
- Original network: TBS
- Original run: April 23, 2016 – March 25, 2017
- Episodes: 47
- icon

Kamiwaza Wanda (カミワザ・ワンダ; lit. 'Miracle Wanda') is a Japanese media franchise created by Takara Tomy. It consists of two manga series, both published by Shogakukan from 2016 to 2017, and a 47-episode anime television series by TMS Entertainment, aired on TBS from April 2016 to March 2017.

== Story ==
In a world where every event is like a computer program, the mysterious creatures called "Promin" maintain the world. However, many Promins have corrupted into viruses and bugs called "Bugmin". Left alone, they may eventually become a big problem. The boy Yuto, along with Wanda, and the pair use a camera-like device and essential items to capture Bugmin. They possess numerous abilities called "Kamiwaza" (miracles), such as "accelerate", "spew fire", and "create", and can fend off Bugmin with them. At first, the Bugmin only causes little, bothersome things, but it will soon escalate into a global-scale threat.

== Characters ==
=== Main characters ===
Yuto (ユート, Yūto)
Voiced by: Sachi Kokuryu
Yuto is a young boy and the son of a couple who work on Kirakira First Street at a hobby store called Hobby Kamiya. Yuto first met Wanda when he went searching for his sister Yui. He later became a Kamiwaza Power-Shooter the very next day after repairing the Kamiwaza Power-Shot. Bug-Tonkamin was the first Bugmin Yuto had captured and debugged himself. However, in the manga, Bug-Turbomin was the first Bugmin he had captured and debugged. He likes to repair things. His Promin buddy is Turbomin.
Wanda (ワンダ)
Voiced by: Kappei Yamaguchi
Wanda is the white cyborg dog from the Wonder-Star planet. He is the prince who was once an heir to the throne of his father, the Wonder-king. In the anime, he was sent to Earth after his home planet was entirely frozen. He then met Yuto and became his Kamiwaza teammate. Wanda searches for any signs of a Bugmin by sniffing and revealing them by using his Kamiwaza Searcher. After Don Bugdez was defeated and his home planet was restored, he decided to return to Earth rather than staying with Nice, Amazing, and Mighty.
Mirai (ミライ)
Voiced by: Suzuko Mimori
Mirai is one of Yuto's friends. She is the daughter of a married couple who work on Kirakira First Street at a flower shop. Later on, Mirai became a Kamiwaza Power-Shooter after she met the Kamiwaza teammate Amazing on Earth. Bug-Hasamin was the first Bugmin Mirai had captured and debugged. Railmin is her Promin buddy. However, Mirai did not become a Kamiwaza Power-Shooter in the manga series.
Amazing (アメイジング, Ameijingu)
Voiced by: Kana Asumi
Amazing is Mirai's Kamiwaza teammate and one of Wanda's friends.
Shuu (シュウ)
Voiced by: Kei Shindou
Shuu is one of Yuto's friends. He is the son of a couple who work at a delicatessen that serves fried foods at Kirakira First Street, especially Wanda's favorite chicken karaage. He is a clever young boy. Shuu became a Kamiwaza Power-Shooter after his Kamiwaza teammate Nice arrived on Earth. Banemin is his Promin buddy. Bug-Kyatchimin was the first Bugmin Shuu had captured and debugged. However, Shuu did not become a Kamiwaza Power-Shooter in the manga series.
Nice (ナイス, Naisu)
Voiced by: Ayumu Murase
Nice is Shuu's Kamiwaza teammate and one of Wanda's friends.
Masato (マサト)
Voiced by: Hiro Shimono
Masato is a rival of Yuto. Before his debut in the series, Masato became a Kamiwaza Power-Shooter when he first met his Kamiwaza teammate Mighty in the rain outside Kirakira Hospital. His goal was to gather up the Fact-Promins for the sake of his younger sister. His Promin buddy is Jetmin. After he failed to confront Don Bugdez on his own, Masato decided to become friends with Yuto.
Mighty (マイティ, Maiti)
Voiced by: Junko Takeuchi
Mighty is Masato's Kamiwaza teammate and Wanda's long-lost friend. Before his debut, Mighty left for Earth after his home planet was completely frozen. Thinking that the Wonder-Star was in ruin, Mighty wanted to make Earth a new home for himself and the rest of his species by gathering up all the Fact-Promins, until he found out in the end that it was just frozen. After Masato failed to confront Don Bugdez on his own, Mighty ran away, leaving Masato behind. Mighty and Wanda are companions, especially when they get separated by mistake, even later on when Mighty decides to help Yuto, Mirai, and Shuu get rid of Don Bugdez with their Kamiwaza teammates Wanda, Nice, and Amazing by using the Fact-Promins and restoring the Wonder-Star using Wonder-Promin.

=== Antagonists ===
Don Bugdez (ドン・バグデス, Don Bagudesu)
Voiced by: Mugihito
Don Bugdez is a huge evil spirit who serves him as their master with Great. He is the arch-nemesis of King Wanda, responsible for the spell that cursed the Wonder-Star, making it prone to invasion by Bugmins, and his goal is to see the chaos on Earth evolve into its ultimate level by gathering negative energy. He becomes furious after seeing all the remaining Bugmins (except for Bug-Gauzemin) being captured and debugged by Yuto and his three friends, turning himself into his monstrous form, and trying to evolve the chaos on Earth to its ultimate level all by himself. However, he was finally defeated by Wonder-Promin and the blasts from the Fact-Promins.
Great (グレイト, Gureito)
Voiced by: Kazuhiro Yamaji
Great is the dog-like mad scientist from the Wonder-Star planet. He disappears from existence after Wonder-Promin defeated Don Bugdez who was in his monstrous form.

==== The Bug Bytes ====
The Bug Bytes (バグバイツ, Bagu Baitsu) is a group of "hackers" who serve their lord Don Bugdez.

Terara (テララ)
Voiced by: Emiri Katou
Terara is a red member of The Bug Bytes who came from a Barbie doll. She owns a Wazawai Program which summons a Bugmin or turns whatever Promin it touches into a Bugmin.
Megaga (メガガ)
Voiced by: Shinya Hamazoe
Megaga is a green member of The Bug Bytes who came from a Stretch Armstrong toy, which gives the ability to stretch.
Gigaga (ギガガ)
Voiced by: Shinnosuke Ogami
Gigaga is the blue member of the Bug Bytes who came from a wrestler figure toy.

=== Supporting characters ===
Yui (ユイ)
Voiced by: Misaki Kuno
Yui is Yuto's younger sister. She has a crush on Wanda, whom she mistook for her family's pet dog, Wannosuke. Yui likes to draw with her crayons.
Souma (ソウマ)
Voiced by: Shuuei Iwase
Souma is one of Yuto's friends. He is a director of Nicole's podcasts at Kirakira Radio Station. He lives in a mansion with his servants. It is later revealed that his servants, including butler Kon Batora, have been working for Souma ever since his parents died in a plane crash.
Nicole (ニコル, Nikoru)
Voiced by: Jun Miruno
Nicole is one of Yuto's friends. She is the daughter of a sea captain and his wife. She hosts her podcasts at Kirakira Radio Station.
Mako (マコ)
Voiced by: Rina Endō
Mako is Masato's younger sister. She was unwell and was hospitalised until Wonder-Promin fully recovered her. Mako likes to do origami.

== Media ==
=== Manga ===
A manga series, illustrated by Chihiro Okitsune, was serialized in Shogakukan's children's manga magazine Corocoro Ichiban from March 19, 2016, to March 21, 2017. Shogakukan collected its chapters in three tankōbon volumes, released from July 28, 2016, to April 28, 2017.

A 4-koma spin-off manga series, titled Kamiwaza Wanda: Fushigina Ikiki no Promin Monogatari (カミワザ・ワンダ 〜ふしぎないきものプロミン物語〜, Kamiwaza Wandā 〜 Fushigina Ikiki no Puromin Monogatari 〜; "Kamiwaza Wanda: Mysterious Creature Promin Stories"), illustrated by Maeda-Kun, was serialized in Corocoro Comic Special from February 29 to December 29, 2016.

=== Volumes ===
No.	Release date	ISBN
1	July 28, 2016	978-4-09140-018-5
01. "Yuto and Wanda, A Combination Is Born!?" (ユート&ワンダ、名コンビ誕生!?); 02. "Bugmin Mass Generation!?" (バグミン大量発生!?); 03. "The Mysterious Trio Bug Bytes Appear!!" (謎の3人組「バグバイツ」が現れた!!); 04. "Turbomin, Charge Up!!" (ターボミン、チャージアップ!!)
After meeting up with Wanda for the first time, Yuto begins his adventures as a Kamiwaza Power-Shooter when he deals with Bug-Turbomin. Yuto and Wanda deal with multiple Bugmins. Later during a barbeque, they have to confront Bug-Chakkamin and rescue Shuu, his parents and Mirai. Bug-Liftmin has kidnapped all the Promins Yuto has so far and Terara of the Bug Bytes has rebugged them all, except Turbomin. With help from Wanda and Turbomin, Yuto has to get his Kamiwaza Power-Shot back and deal with Bug-Liftmin, Bug-Jetmin and several rebugged Bugmins.
2	December 28, 2016	978-4-09142-329-0
05. "I Can't Go Home!!" (お家に帰れない!!); 06. "Rival!? Friend!? A Transfer Student Has Arrived!!" (敵!? 味方!? 転入生がやってきた!!); 07. "Wanda Is Useless-Ken!?" (ワンダたちは役立たずケン!?); 08. "Fusion Promins, Summon!!" (合成プロミン、召喚!!); 09. "Revenge With The Kamiwaza Shaker!!" (カミワザシェイカーでリベンジ!!); Extra chapter: "Narikiri Turbomin" (ナリキリターボミン)
Yuto and Wanda have to find a way to get out of the maze set by Bug-Mapmin. Masato, Yuto's rival, and his Kamiwaza teammate Mighy arrive at Kirakira First Street. Yuto and Wanda deal with Bug-Tsukkomin. They later have to find out which Bugmin caused the bad smell first before Masato and Mighty do so. Yuto and Wanda try out the new Kamiwaza Shaker. Whilst impressing Masato and Mighty, Yuto and Wanda use Fusion Promins to deal with Bug-Motemin, Bug-Artmin and Bug-Divemin.
3	April 28, 2017	978-4-09142-397-9
10. "Bugdez, Come On!?" (バグデス、来襲!?); 11. "Protect The Earth With The Powers Together!!" (力を合わせて地球を守れ!!); 12. "Concentration! Fact-Promins!!" (集結! ファクトプロミンズ!!); 13. "2 Bonds Are Forever!!" (2人のきずなは永遠に!!)
At the Tokyo Science Museum, Yuto manages to awaken the first of the Fact-Promins: Rocketmin. Yuto and Wanda help out rival Masato and long lost friend Mighty who have failed to take on Don Bugdez on their own. Yuto, Masato and their Kamiwaza teammates awakened all the Fact-Promins and are ready to take on Don Bugdez. With Don Bugdez gone for good, thanks to Wonder-Promin, Yuto and Wanda are able to go and thaw the Wonder-Star with Mighty coming along with them.

=== Anime ===
An anime television series, animated by TMS Entertainment, was announced in January 2016. The series was broadcast on TBS from April 23, 2016, to March 23, 2017. For the first 22 episodes, the opening theme is "Wanda Nanda!?" (ワンダナンダ！？), performed by Daigo, while the ending theme is "Samba de Wanda" (サンバdeワンダ), performed by Kappei Yamaguchi (credited as Wanda). For episodes 23–47, the opening theme is "Bagutte Iijan" (バグっていいじゃん) by HKT48, while the ending theme is "Wonderland" by Radio Fish.

==== Episodes ====
No.	Title	Air date
1	An Emissary From The Wonder-Star (ワンダー星からの使者)	April 23, 2016
After repairing the Kamiwaza Power-Shot for Wanda, Yuto began his adventures as a Kamiwaza Power-Shooter.
2	Zoo Panic!! (ズーズーパニック!!)	April 30, 2016
The animals have escaped from a zoo and started raiding Kirakira Elementary School. Yuto and Wanda know that it can be Bug-Kagimin's doing.
3 (Note: Aired as the 4th episode)	The Rail Continues (レールは続くよ)	May 14, 2016
Yuto was too busy playing his favorite video game. Being ignored by Yuto, Wanda left for the amusement park and finished up on a roller coaster train ride set by Bug-Railmin.
4 (Note: Aired as the 3rd episode)	Mother's Day Is The Day Of The Bugs (母の日はバグの日)	May 7, 2016
It's Mother's Day and Yuto must keep the house clean for his mother Yuuka. However, 5 Bugmins appear to make a mess.
5	Beware of Bugmin, Beware of Fire (バグミン用心 火の用心)	May 21, 2016
Yuto has some trouble dealing with Bug-Chakkamin whilst helping Shuu, his parents and Mirai prepare for a barbeque at a riverside.
6	First Prize of Kirakira Star (キラキラスター1番星)	May 28, 2016
Mirai participates in a singing competition held at Kirakira First Street on the day of her parents' wedding anniversary.
7	Crying Sandwich! (にぎってはさんで!)	June 4, 2016
During a food festival, Detokkusu Komatsu comes to Kirakira First Street and closes almost all the food shops and restaurants there due to her negative criticism of their food. That was until Bug-Sharimin draws in.
8	Quiz Battle In The Library!! (図書館クイズバトル!!)	June 11, 2016
Yuto finds that it was all Bug-Jishomin's fault after terribly getting 0% on his next test. Yuto and his friends Mirai and Shuu then have to take on a quiz challenge against the Bug Bytes.
9	Stolen Promin!! (うばわれたプロミン!!)	June 18, 2016
Wanda shows Yuto the Kamiwaza File and explains about Promin-Land. Later, with help from the Promins he has so far, Yuto has to deal with Bug-Hasamin.
10	Burst Kamiwaza Shot (炸裂カミワザショット)	June 25, 2016
Continuing from what was left from the previous episode, Yuto has to deal with Bug-Jetmin, Bug-Liftmin, and various rebugged Bugmins on his own while Yui, her father, Hiruto, and Yuto's friends Mirai and Shuu look for Wanda.
11	Goodbye Wanda... (さよならワンダ･･･)	July 2, 2016
Yuto and his friends Mirai and Shuu investigate the phenomenon of disappearing writing and images caused by Bug-Keshigomin. The latter Bugmin also removed Wanda's face so Yuto and his friends and Yui all try to replace it for him.
12	Charge Up!! (チャージアップ!!)	July 9, 2016
All the Promins Yuto has so far are in for some special training.
13	Wanda Of The Wonderland (ふしぎの国のワンダ)	July 16, 2016
Yuto has to investigate the problem with Wanda's dreams. He and Wanda find out that the situation was caused by Bug-Yumemin.
14	The Flying Fan (空とぶ扇風機)	July 23, 2016
Yuto and Wanda both try to repair an electric fan for Jii Yoda and his wife Baa. Later, they must stop Bug-Senpuumin and retrieve back the same electric fan.
15	Which Way Is This? (あっちこっちどっち?)	July 30, 2016
Yuto with his three friends, and their fathers are on a road trip to the beach with Wanda coming with them. However, Bug-Mapmin caused them to be sent to the wrong ways.
16	Marathon Bounce (マラソンだびょ～～ん)	August 6, 2016
An annual marathon race is due to be held at Kirakira First Street and Shuu was worried that if he finish last, his rivals Ryuta and Michiko will laugh at him. Would the twins really do that to Shuu for real?
17	Magnetic Wanda! (マグネロボ・ワンダ!)	August 20, 2016
Yuto and his friends and Wanda are on a school trip to the Tokyo Science Museum. In there, Yuto, Mirai, and Shuu deal with Bug-Magnemin who caused Wanda to become magnetic.
18	A Promin Knockout Case (プロミン殺ミン事ケン)	August 27, 2016
During a party at Souma's mansion, Yuto and his friends investigate the mystery of the knocked-out Promins. Yuto finds that the culprit is Bug-Stopmin.
19	Television Star Nicole! (シビレるぜ、ニコル!)	September 3, 2016
Nicole has been chosen to star in a special television broadcast. Later, Yuto has to deal with Bug-Plugmin who took control of Nicole.
20	Black Kamiwaza Shot (黒のカミワザショット)	September 10, 2016
A new Kamiwaza Power-Shooter comes to Kirakira First Street and dealt with Bug-Dancemin. Later, Yuto and his friends try to follow the new Kamiwaza Power-Shooter whose name is Masato.
21	Masato & Mighty (マサトとマイティ)	September 17, 2016
Yuto and his friends invite Masato and his Kamiwaza teammate Mighty to a welcome party. Later, Yuto tried to deal with Bug-Boatmin who caused a swan boat to go out of control.
22	Promin VS Promin (プロミンVSプロミン)	September 24, 2016
Nasty smells lurk around Yuto and his friends and Wanda. That was until Masato finds Bug-Sumerumin.
23	Counterattack Of The Bug Bytes (バグバイツの逆襲)	October 1, 2016
Masato and his Kamiwaza teammate Mighty were dragged into an underwater dimension through a puddle in a failed attempt to capture and debug Bug-Recordmin. With help from Recordmin and Mutemin, Yuto has to deal with Bug-Divemin.
24	A Sugary Scramble Battle! (あまあま争奪バトル)	October 8, 2016
Yuto and Masato have a competition to see who will capture and debug Bug-Shugamin first.
25	Kamiwaza Shaker! (カミワザシェイカー！)	October 15, 2016
Yuto's friends and Wanda were having trouble dealing with 5 Bugmins until Yuto comes along with his newest invention...
26	Shake Fusion Promin (シェイク合成プロミン)	October 22, 2016
Yuto has to take on 3 challenges using the Kamiwaza Shaker. Later, Yuto has to deal with Bug-Coromin.
27	The Strongest Awasewaza! (最強の合わせワザ！)	October 29, 2016
Plastic wrapping has appeared across Kirakira First Street and anywhere else thanks to Bug-Rappumin.
28	Masato's Black Trap (マサトの黒いワナ)	November 5, 2016
Uh oh! Yuto and his friends and Wanda fell right into a trap done by Masato and Mighty with the Promin Bellmin. Also, Stopmin has been rebugged.
29	Escaping Wanda! (ワンダ大脱出！)	November 12, 2016
Yuto and Masato have to stop Bug-Sukemin at an amusement park, which nearly ruined Lady Marikko's magic show, and save Wanda.
30	Kamiwaza Panda (カミワザ・パンダ！)	November 19, 2016
Street performer Takezo Panda has become too attractive and was chased by everyone including Wanda. This was all the fault of Bug-Motemin.
31	A Surprising Big Riot! (ア～ッと驚く大騒動！)	November 26, 2016
Keshigomin was upset so Wanda and Yuto try and cheer him up. Meanwhile, Bug-Artmin was causing chaos, doing graffiti everywhere.
32	Wanda's Love Story (ワンダの恋の物語)	December 3, 2016
Wanda falls in love with a cat named Momotarou, mistaking him for a girl cat. Bug-Heartmin has been reading anyone's heart the strange way, especially Momotarou's.
33	Wish Upon A Folding Crane (折り鶴に願いを)	December 10, 2016
Thanks to Bug-Origamin, giant origami monsters start to raid Kirakira First Street and anywhere else. Poor Masato could not deal with that situation as it reminded him of his sister Mako.
34	The Legendary Promin! (伝説のプロミン！)	December 17, 2016
To save Christmas, Yuto has to stop 3 Bugmins from wreaking havoc.
35	Rocketmin Appears! (ロケットミン登場！)	December 24, 2016
Whilst confronting Ginga Hoshaburo, who was brainwashed by Bug-Mentemin, Yuto awakens the first of the Fact-Promins: Rocketmin.
36	Advance! Wanda Expeditionary Corps (進め！ワンダ探ケン隊)	January 7, 2017
Yuto and his friends go on an expedition, with help from Wanda, Turbomin, and Zuzumin, to search for 4 Bugmins.
37	Big And Small (ビッグアンドスモール)	January 14, 2017
In a garden at Souma's mansion, Yuto and his friends have been shrunken by Bug-Smallmin. Later after it was captured and debugged, Wanda became enlarged by Bug-Bigmin.
38	Shaker Robbery Order (シェイカー強奪指令)	January 21, 2017
After failing to steal Yuto's, the Bug Bytes make their own Kamiwaza Shaker, with help from Great, then have it stolen by Masato.
39	Buruburu Race Competition (ブルブル争奪猛レース)	January 28, 2017
Yuto, Masato, Wanda, Mighty, and the Bug Bytes all participate in a race, especially when Bug-Yajiromin is around.
40	Tengu, Tengu, Tengu! (テングテングテング！)	February 4, 2017
After hearing about the legend of the tengu and seeing some girls admiring Souma, Yuto and Wanda have to sort out the situation caused by the naughty Bug-Tengumin.
41	Memory Warnings (おもいで注意報)	February 11, 2017
Bug-Memorymin has made almost everyone at Kirakira First Street remember unpleasant memories.
42	Raid! Don Bugadez (急襲！ドン・バグデス)	February 18, 2017
After awakening the Fact-Promin Dozermin, Masato takes on Don Bugadez on his own.
43	Great's Secret (グレイトの秘密)	February 25, 2017
Yuto and Masato are having trouble dealing with Bug-Katasumin and a strange closet. That was until Wanda's 2 friends Amazing and Nice arrive on Earth.
44	Nice & Amazing (ナイスとアメイジング)	March 4, 2017
With their Kamiwaza teammates Amazing and Nice aiding them, Mirai and Shuu help Yuto and Masato stop the 2 rebugged Bugmins Bug-Turbomin and Bug-Jetmin.
45	Yuto, Desperate Situation! (ユート、絶体絶命！)	March 11, 2017
Yuto has finally captured and debugged Bug-Katasumin. Afterward, something worse is happening so Yuto and his friends have to get all the Fact-Promins awakened and ready.
46	Bring Down Bugdez! (バグデスを倒せ！)	March 18, 2017
Yuto and his friends take on Don Bugdez's monstrous form.
47	Forever Wanda! (ワンダよ永遠に!)	March 25, 2017
Yuto, Mirai, and Shuu with their Kamiwaza teammates go on a space journey to thaw the Wonder-Star.

=== Video game ===
A video game for the Nintendo 3DS by FuRyu, titled Kamiwaza Wanda: Kirakira Ichibangai Kikiippatsu! (カミワザ・ワンダ キラキラ一番街危機一髪!), was released on October 27, 2016.
