= Distopping =

Studio album by Charisma.com
- Released: June 4, 2014
- Recorded: 2012–2014
- Genres: Electropop, hip hop
- Length: 52:22
- Language: Japanese
- Label: Lastrum

Charisma.com chronology
Ai Ai Syndrome (2013)	Distopping (2014)	OLest (2015)

Singles from Distopping
- 1. "Chankoi" Released: January 31, 2014; 2. "Happy Turn" Released: February 28, 2014; 3. "Iinazuke Blue" Released: May 22, 2014

Distopping (stylised as DIStopping) is the first studio album by Japanese musical group Charisma.com. It was released on June 4, 2014 through independent record label Lastrum, eleven months after their debut extended play Ai Ai Syndrome.

== Background and development ==
Charisma.com formed in 2011, featuring rapper Itsuka and DJ Gonchi. Due to the popularity of the groups's videos on YouTube, they were able to debut as musicians. In July 2013, the group released their debut extended play Ai Ai Syndrome through independent label Lastrum. It reached number 52 on Oricon's weekly albums chart. In April 2014, Charisma.com officially announced Distopping.

== Writing and production ==
Itsuka explained the album had a theme of society versus the self, and was inspired to write about how unprompted disses by people were pointless complaints. The original concept for the album was a week in the life on an office lady, however that changed, as Itsuka wanted to express more songs featuring weakness. The title is a pun, referring both to stopping disses and topping disses.

Compared to Ai Ai Syndrome, the album featured a greater variety of trackmakers, including Fragment and Annebeats.

== Promotion and release ==
In January and February 2014, two of Charisma.com's songs were used in promotional campaigns for department store chain Parco: "Chankoi" for their Valentine's Day and "Happy Turn" in their White Day campaign. "Chankoi" was released as a digital download on January 31, 2014, followed by "Happy Turn" on February 28.

On May 22, the duo released the leading track "Iinazuke Blue"'s music video to YouTube. The video for featured thirty junior high school students in a choir performing a "surreal" dance. The song reached number 66 on the Billboard Japan Hot 100 chart in early June 2014. On August 2, 2014, "Iinazuke Blue" was released as a limited edition vinyl single to HMV Japan's Shibuya store.

Charisma.com performed "Iinazuka Blue" live at Music Japan on June 22, 2014. To promote the album, Charisma.com embarked on a five date national tour of Japan in July 2014, entitled OL Joker.

== Critical reception ==
The album was positively received by critics. Skream! reviewer Fumiaki Amano felt the album was sharper, poppier and deeper than Ai Ai Syndrome. Masaya Kondo of What's In? felt the album was more diverse than Ai Ai Syndrome, noting the father character in "Mr. Beer", and "Chankoi", which was focused on romantic troubles. He praised Itsuka's rapid "information dense" lyrics, and felt Distopping had more universal themes than Ai Ai Syndrome, which was more targeted exclusively towards women. CDJournal reviewers praised the release's "crazy and strong lyrics and tracks".

In reviewing "Happy Turn", Koyuki Okumura of Skream! described the song as "vividly expressed the feelings of girls disgusted with daily life", and felt it was lighter song compared to the music on Ai Ai Syndrome.

== Track listing ==
No.	Title	Lyrics	Music	Length
1.	"Iinazuke Blue" (イイナヅケブルー, "Fiancé Blue")	Itsuka	Itsuka, Takashi Morio	3:50
2.	"Looker"	Itsuka	Itsuka, Morio	4:00
3.	"Super Girl" (スーパーガール Sūpā Gāru)	Itsuka	Itsuka, Nagomu Tamaki	4:06
4.	"No Datte"	Itsuka	Itsuka, Masaaki Enatsu	4:52
5.	"Sodai Gomi no Koi" (sodaiゴミのkoi, "Useless Husband Love")	Itsuka	Itsuka, Yasuhito Yamada	4:22
6.	"Chankoi" (チャンコイ, "Chance Coin")	Itsuka	Itsuka, Yasuhito Yamada	3:19
7.	"Mr. Beer"	Itsuka	Itsuka, Tamaki	4:44
8.	"Jenga Jenga" (ジェンガジェンガ)	Itsuka	Itsuka, Shingo Sakai	2:48
9.	"Train Hell"	Itsuka	Itsuka, Chefoba	4:54
10.	"Sorairo Will" (空色will, "Sky-colored Will")	Itsuka	Itsuka, Yamada	4:40
11.	"Pain Off" (ペインオフ Pein Ofu)	Itsuka	Itsuka, Yamada	3:56
12.	"100% Boobie" (100%ブービー Hyaku Pāsento Būbī)	Itsuka	Itsuka, Anne Beats	3:03
13.	"Happy Turn" (ハッピーターン Happī Tān)	Itsuka	Itsuka, Anne Beats	3:42
Total length:				52:22

== Charts ==
Charts	Peak position
Japan Oricon weekly albums	48

=== Sales ===
Chart	Amount
Oricon physical sales	4,000

== Release history ==
Region	Date	Format	Distributing Label	Catalogue codes
Japan	June 4, 2014	CD, digital download	Lastrum	LACD-0248
Japan	June 18, 2014	Rental CD	Lastrum	LACD-0248
