= Kiss wa Matsushikanai no Deshōka? =

- Type A cover

Single by HKT48
- A-side: "Kiss wa Matsushikanai no Deshōka?"
- B-side: Sakuranbo wo Musuberuka?; Tonari no Kare wa Kakko yoku Mieru (Type A); Gunyatto Magatta (Type B); Koisuru Ribbon! (Type C); Romantic Byou (Theater Edition)
- Released: August 2, 2017
- Genre: J-pop
- Label: Universal Music
- Songwriter(s): Yasushi Akimoto (lyrics); Inoue Tomonori (music)
- Producer(s): Yasushi Akimoto

HKT48 singles chronology
"Bagutte Iijan" (2017)	"Kiss wa Matsushikanai no Deshōka?" (2017)	"Hayaokuri Calendar" (2018)

Music video (Full version)
- "Kiss wa Matsushikanai no Deshōka?" (キスは待つしかないのでしょうか？)

"Kiss wa Matsushikanai no Deshōka?" (キスは待つしかないのでしょうか?) is the 10th single by the Japanese idol girl group HKT48. It was released on August 2, 2017. The choreographic center is performed by Hana Matsuoka.

The single was number-one on the Oricon Singles Chart and was also number-one on the Billboard Japan Hot 100.

== Track listing ==
=== Type A ===
CD+DVD: UPCH-89353
No.	Title	Length
1.	"Kiss wa Matsushikanai no Deshōka?"
2.	"Sakuranbo wo Musuberuka? (4th Generation)"
3.	"Tonari no Kare wa Kakko yoku Mieru (Platinum Girls)"
4.	"Kiss wa Matsushikanai no Deshōka? (off vocal)"
5.	"Sakuranbo wo Musuberuka? (off vocal)"
6.	"Tonari no Kare wa Kakko yoku Mieru (off vocal)"

=== Type B ===
CD+DVD: UPCH-89354
No.	Title	Length
1.	"Kiss wa Matsushikanai no Deshōka?"
2.	"Sakuranbo wo Musuberuka? (4th Generation)"
3.	"Gunyatto Magatta (Diamond Girls)"
4.	"Kiss wa Matsushikanai no Deshōka? (off vocal)"
5.	"Sakuranbo wo Musuberuka? (off vocal)"
6.	"Gunyatto Magatta (off vocal)"

=== Type C ===
CD+DVD: UPCH-89354
No.	Title	Length
1.	"Kiss wa Matsushikanai no Deshōka?"
2.	"Sakuranbo wo Musuberuka? (4th Generation)"
3.	"Koisuru Ribbon! (Murashige Senbatsu)"
4.	"Kiss wa Matsushikanai no Deshōka? (off vocal)"
5.	"Sakuranbo wo Musuberuka? (off vocal)"
6.	"Koisuru Ribbon! (off vocal)"

=== Theater version ===
CD+DVD: PRON-5022
No.	Title	Length
1.	"Kiss wa Matsushikanai no Deshōka?"
2.	"Sakuranbo wo Musuberuka? (4th Generation)"
3.	"Romantic Byou"
4.	"Kiss wa Matsushikanai no Deshōka? (off vocal)"
5.	"Sakuranbo wo Musuberuka? (off vocal)"
6.	"Romantic Byou (off vocal)"

== Personnel ==
=== "Kiss wa Matsushikanai no Deshōka? (Senbatsu)" ===
The performers of the main single are:

- Team H: Kodama Haruka, Sashihara Rino, Tashima Meru, Tanaka Miku, Matsuoka Natsumi, Yabuki Nako
- Team KIV: Tomiyoshi Asuka, Tomonaga Mio, Fuchigami Mai, Miyawaki Sakura, Motomura Aoi, Moriyasu Madoka
- Team TII: Sakamoto Erena, Matsuoka Hana
- Kenkyuusei: Tsukiashi Amane, Toyonaga Aki

=== "Sakuranbo wo Musuberuka?" ===
"Sakuranbo wo Musuberuka?" was performed by 4th Generation members, consisting of:

- Kenkyuusei: Unjo Hirona, Oda Ayaka, Sakai Moeka, Shimizu Rio, Takeda Tomoka, Jitoe Nene, Tsukiashi Amane, Toyonaga Aki, Matsumoto Hinata, Miyazaki Sono

=== "Tonari no Kare wa Kakko yoku Mieru" ===
"Tonari no Kare wa Kakko yoku Mieru" was performed by Platinum Girls, consisting of:

- Team H: Kojina Yui, Komada Hiroka, Sakaguchi Riko, Tanaka Natsumi
- Team KIV: Ueki Nao, Kumazawa Serina, Shimono Yuki, Tanaka Yuka
- Team TII: Aramaki Misaki, Hokazono Hazuki
- Kenkyuusei: Unjo Hirona, Oda Ayaka, Shimizu Rio, Takeda Tomoka, Jitoe Nene, Matsumoto Hinata

=== "Gunyatto Magatta" ===
"Gunyatto Magatta" was performed by Diamond Girls, consisting of:

- Team H: Akiyoshi Yuka, Ui Mashiro, Ueno Haruka, Yamada Marina, Yamamoto Mao
- Team KIV: Imada Mina, Iwahana Shino, Fukagawa Maiko, Murashige Anna
- Team TII: Imamura Maria, Kurihara Sae, Murakawa Vivian, Yamauchi Yuna, Yamashita Emiri
- Kenkyuusei: Sakai Moeka, Miyazaki Sono

=== "Koisuru Ribbon!" ===
"Koisuru Ribbon!" was performed by Murashige Senbatsu, consisting of:

- Team H: Akiyoshi Yuka, Kojina Yui, Kodama Haruka, Tanaka Natsumi
- Team KIV: Imada Mina, Ueki Nao, Shimono Yuki, Tomiyoshi Asuka, Fukagawa Maiko, Miyawaki Sakura, Murashige Anna
- Team TII: Aramaki Misaki, Yamashita Emiri
- Kenkyuusei: Oda Ayaka, Takeda Tomoka
- Team A: Nakanishi Chiyori

=== "Romantic Byou" ===
"Romantic Byou" was performed by 5 members:

- Team H: Tashima Meru, Tanaka Miku, Yabuki Nako
- Team KIV: Tomonaga Mio
- Team TII: Matsuoka Hana
