= Charisma.com =

Japanese electronic rap duo

- Origin: Kanagawa Prefecture, Japan
- Genres: Hip hop, electropop
- Years active: 2011 - 2017; 2023 - present
- Labels: Warner Music Japan, Lastrum
- Members: Itsuka; Gonchi
- Website: official-charisma.com

Charisma.com (カリスマドットコム, Karisuma Dotto Komu) is a Japanese electro/rap duo which formed in 2011. and made up of MC Itsuka and DJ Gonchi. The musicians work as office ladies at the same time as performing. In 2015, the group made their major label debut with Warner Music Japan.

The duo went on indefinite hiatus in December 2017. In June 2023 they released the single "LOWGUYS", being the first music from Charisma.com since September 2018's "Introduction teki na" (Introduction的な, lit. 'Introduction-like') and the first music they released as a duo since 2017. The single was later featured on the EP MOBSTRONG, released on 12 July 2023.

== Biography ==
Members Itsuka and Gonchi first met when they were junior high school classmates; however, they had never collaborated musically until adulthood. After Itsuka graduated high school and went to university, she joined her friend's rock band as the vocalist. When that group later disbanded, Itsuka wanted to continue in the music business. Gonchi was experienced with turntables, as her brother was a DJ, so Itsuka contacted Gonchi to start a duo. Gonchi accepted, having no plans after returning from studying overseas and waiting for university to begin. The group originally intended to create rock music. However, Itsuka became interested in rapping after performing rapped lyrics in karaoke settings; she eventually decided that her rap skills were better than her singing skills, and decided to rap in Charisma.com. "Charisma" was originally a nickname Itsuka had been given by her vocalist friend. After adding more people, she added the ".com" to represent the word "company", unaware at the time that the domain name .com referred to the word "commercial".

Charisma.com created a blog on Ameblo and posted their first entry on October 1, 2011. The group uploaded their first song, "Hate", to YouTube on July 9, 2012. At the same time, Itsuka worked with 07ch Records, collaborating with C.R.E.A.M Sodaz on their Kissa Dark Side album in November 2011, and releasing her own extended play Majo EP under the name Meliyas (メリヤス♀, Meriyasu) in September 2012. The group uploaded their second song, "George", to YouTube on February 7, 2013.

Due to the popularity of their videos on YouTube, the group were able to release their debut extended play Ai Ai Syndrome on July 10, 2013. The release was promoted with a new recording of "Hate", which managed to chart in the top 50 of Billboard's Japan Hot 100 singles chart. Ai Ai Syndrome was well-received critically, being awarded at the 2014 CD Shop Awards for best Kantō region artist. The release impressed iTunes Japan staff, who listed them in their annual list of new artists who they expect to break into mainstream music in 2014.

In April 2014, Itsuka announced the return of her solo project Meliyas, and released a full-length album Majo LP exclusively to 500 members of the Charisma.com fanclub. It was later given a wide release in November 2014.

The group's debut studio album Distopping was released on June 4, 2014. This was followed by "Mirra Killer", a digital single collaborating with dance troupe Tempura Kidz. In early 2015, Charisma.com performed the theme song for the live action film adaptation of Tomohiro Koizumi's manga Shinda Me o Shita Shōnen, entitled "Tongari Young"; in April 2015 they released the single "Kongara Girl", which was written to promote Tangle Teezer-brand hair brushes.

In July 2015, Charisma.com released their first extended play under major label Warner Music Japan, OLest.

On December 8, 2017, Charisma.com announce that it was going on indefinite hiatus. Gonchi decided to retire from the entertainment industry to help out with her family's business. The duo's final activity was a farewell concert held at Zepp Tokyo on January 27, 2018.

On September 8, 2018, Charisma.com returned — now as solo project by Itsuka — with the new single "Introduction teki na" released on the Charisma.com YouTube channel.

Four years later, Itsuka released the single "LOWGUYS" on June 14, 2023, under the Charisma.com brand. The followed EP MOBSTRONG, featuring "LOWGUYS", was then released a month later on July 12, 2023.

== Members ==
- Itsuka (いつか) is the group's MC and lyricist.
- Gonchi (ゴンチ) is the group's DJ, who is in charge of turn tables.

== Musical style ==
Charisma.com's sound was inspired by Japanese hip-hop group Astro, which inspired Itsuka to make music featuring rapping on top of a constant dance beat.

The group's songs begin after Itsuka requests music made by trackmakers. After she receives them, she adds lyrics and a melody. Both members continue to work their jobs as office ladies in addition to being members of Charisma.com. Itsuka works at the office of a magazine, while Gonchi works at a company specialising in precision machinery. Much of Charisma.com's music is inspired by everyday happenings in offices, especially the difference between life as a musician compared to life as an office lady.

Itsuka's lyrics when she first began performing music were originally more about love, however the longer she worked as an office lady, the more she sang about society and angrier things. During Distopping, most of her songs were from the point of view of other people, including her younger sister, her coworkers or is inspired by snatches of conversation on the train.

Critics have focused praise on Charisma.com for Itsuka's lyric style and rapping.

== Discography ==
=== Studio albums ===
List of albums, with selected chart positions
Title	Album details	Peak positions
Title	Album details	JPN
Distopping	Released: June 4, 2014 (JPN); Label: Lastrum; Formats: CD, digital download	48
Not not me	Released: March 22, 2017 _{(JPN)}; Label: Warner Music Japan/Atlantic Japan; Formats: CD, digital download	55

=== Compilation albums ===
List of albums, with selected chart positions
Title	Album details	Peak positions
Title	Album details	JPN
Charisma.BEST	Released: January 10, 2018 (JPN); Label: Warner Music Japan; Formats: CD, digital download	37

=== Extended plays ===
List of extended plays, with selected chart positions
Title	Album details	Peak positions
Title	Album details	JPN
Ai Ai Syndrome (アイ アイ シンドローム, Ai Ai Shindorōmu)	Released: July 10, 2013 (JPN); Label: Lastrum; Formats: CD, digital download	52
OLest	Released: July 8, 2015 (JPN); Label: Warner Music Japan; Formats: CD, digital download	31
Aidoro C (愛泥C)	Released: March 2, 2016 (JPN); Label: Warner; Formats: CD, digital download	24
unPOP	Released: November 22, 2016 (JPN); Label: Warner; Formats: digital download	—

=== Promotional singles ===
Title	Year	Peak chart positions	Album
Title	Year	JPN Hot 100 (Note: Sources for chart positions are as follows: "Hate", "Chankoi", "Iinazuke Blue", "Otsubone Rock", "Suppliminal Diet".)	Album
"Hate"	2013	48	Ai Ai Syndrome
"Chankoi" (チャンコイ; "Chance Coin")	2014	80	Distopping
"Happy Turn" (ハッピーターン, Happī Tān)	2014	— (Note: Charted at number 33 on the Billboard Adult Contemporary Airplay Chart.)	Distopping
"Iinazuke Blue" (イイナヅケブルー; "Fiancé Blue")	2014	66	Distopping
"Mirra Killer" (ミイラキラー; "Killer Mummy") (Tempura Kidz vs Charisma.com)	2014	—	Tenkomori
"Tongari Young" (とんがりヤング; "Sharp Young")	2015	—	Non-album single
"Kongara Girl" (こんがらガール; "Tangle Girl")	2015	— (Note: Charted at number 57 on the Adult Contemporary Airplay chart.)	OLest
"Otsubone Rock" (お局ロック; "Court Woman Rock")	2015	33	OLest
"Suppliminal Diet" (サプリミナル・ダイエット, Sapuriminaru Daietto)	2016	75	Aidoro C

== Bibliography ==
- Charisma.com (January 15, 2016), Gametsuku Strong ~ dokuzetsu OL rappā, seken o buttagiru! (in Japanese) (Paperback ed.), Tokyo: Fusosha Publishing, ISBN 978-4-594-07415-9 (Note: with song "Job go no Makeup" in a CD)
