= Yahyel =

Japanese indie pop band

yahyel
- Origin: Tokyo, Japan
- Genres: indie pop, dream pop, synth pop
- Years active: 2015–present
- Label: Beat Records
- Members: Shun Ikegai; Wataru Sugimoto; Kento Yamada; Kazuya Ooi
- Past members: Miru Shinoda

yahyel are an indie pop band formed Tokyo in 2015.

The name of the band is a word meaning "alien", according to a cult based in the United States. The band chose the name since Japanese artists are often treated as alien outside of Japan.

== History ==
=== 2015: formation and Y ===
In 2015, Ikegai, Shinoda, and Sugimoto formed the band.

In May 2015, they released their first EP Y, which was acclaimed by critics.

In January 2016, they toured in London and held a mini concert at Rough Trade. They released their second EP Fool / Midnight Run soon after their tour.

=== 2016: smash hit of "Once" ===
On 8 July 2016, yahyel's first single, "Once", was released. On 28 September 2016, "Once" was re-released with additional track "The Flare". The CD was mastered by Matt Colton and sold out soon after its release. In November 2016, they released their debut album Flesh and Blood, which ranked at number 68 on the Billboard Japan Album Chart.

=== 2026: Passing of Miru Shinoda ===
On June 20, 2026, the band announced that Shinoda passed away on April 14, 2026.

== Discography ==
=== Albums ===
==== Studio albums ====
Title	Album details	Peak chart positions		
Title	Album details	JPN Oricon	JPN Billboard	JPN Sales
Flesh and Blood	Released: 23 November 2016; Label: Beat Records; Formats: CD, digital download	69	68	63
Human	Released: 7 March 2018; Label: Beat Records; Formats: CD, digital download, LP	TBA		
Loves&Cults	Released: 8 March 2023; Label: LOVE/CULT; Formats: CD, digital download, LP	TBA		

==== Extended plays ====
Title	EP details	Peak chart positions	
Title	EP details	JPN Oricon	JPN Billboard
Y	Released: May 2015; Label: Self-released; Formats: digital download	—	-
Fool / Midnight Run	Released: 10 February 2016; Label: Hot Buttered Record; Formats: 7-inch vinyl + download code	—	-
Once / The Flare	Released: 28 September 2016; Label: Hot Buttered Record; Formats: 7-inch vinyl + download code	—	-
Fool / Midnight Run	Released: 10 February 2016; Label: Beat Records; Formats: CD	—	-
Iron / Rude	Released: 2 August 2017; Label: Beat Records; Formats: 7-inch vinyl + download code	199	-

=== Singles ===
==== As lead artist ====
Year	Single	Peak chart positions			Album
Year	Single	JPN Oricon	JPN Hot 100	JPN Radio	Album
2016	"Once"	-	-	-	Flesh and Blood
2017	"Iron"	-	-	-	—N/a

==== Promotional singles ====
Year	Single	Peak chart positions			Album
Year	Single	JPN Oricon	JPN Hot 100	JPN Radio	Album
2016	"Alone"	-	-	100	Flesh and Blood
