= Asami Nagakiya =

- Born: 1985
- Died: 9 February 2016 (aged 30–31) Queen's Park Savannah
- Instrument: Steel pan

Asami Nagakiya (1985–2016) was a Japanese musician, a steel pan player, who traveled regularly to Trinidad and Tobago to perform for the annual Carnival celebrations. She was found dead, in a case determined by the coroner to be murder by strangulation, on 9 February 2016, in a park that hosted Carnival activities, in the capital, Port-of-Spain.

== Biography ==
A 30-year-old musician, a steel pan player from Sapporo, Hokkaido, Japan, Asami Nagakiya was a regular to Trinidad's Carnival. She also played in several carnival bands and studied music at the Senzoku Gakuen College of Music.

== Death ==
Nagakiya was found dead in Queens Park Savannah, Port of Spain dressed in a "two-piece masquerade outfit", on Ash Wednesday morning. The attire was further described by witnesses as being yellow, a bikini, and bejeweled in the fashion of Carnival costumes. The park in the capital, Port-of-Spain, is a location that hosts "major carnival parades and events", and reports varied as to the discovery of the body there (on Wednesday morning, either by "workers cleaning the park following... [the] celebrations" or by bystanders that included a homeless man. On the next day (Thursday), the coroner’s office reported that the death had been by strangulation, and that the body had been "slashed on her arm". No mention was made in that report regarding signs of sexual abuse. As of 12 February, the death was being investigated as a murder, and as of that date, there were no named suspects for the crime. In March 2021, Director of Public Prosecutions Roger Gaspard announced that the case had been closed, concluding that the murderer was a man named David Allen who had been killed by police in December 2016.

== Resignation of mayor of Port of Spain ==
On February 16, 2016, mayor Raymond Tim Kee of Port of Spain resigned from his office. The resignation came following outrage over controversial comments he made a week earlier, soon after Nagakiya's death. His comments referred to the responsibility of women in preventing their own abuse. Kee was succeeded by deputy mayor Keron Valentine.
