= White Ash (band) =

Japanese rock band

- Origin: Tokyo, Japan
- Genres: Alternative rock; garage rock; post-punk; rock and roll revival
- Years active: 2006–2017
- Label: VAP Inc.
- Past members: Nobita; Yama-san; Aya; Tsuyoshi
- Website: whiteash.jp

White Ash (ホワイト・アッシュ, Howaito Asshu; stylized in all caps) was a Japanese rock band. Formed in 2006, the quartet was initially a cover band of Arctic Monkeys. Upon its release of the compilation album Love, On December 22, 2016, it was announced that they will disband for the reasons that weren't disclosed. White Ash disbanded in March 2017.

== Members ==
Instruments adapted from White Ash's official website.

- Nobita – vocals, guitar
- Yama-san – guitar
- Aya – bass
- Tsuyoshi – drums

== Discography ==
=== Albums ===
==== Studio albums ====
Title	Album details	Peak chart positions			Sales
Title	Album details	Oricon Albums Chart	Billboard Japan Top Albums Sales (Note: Week references for Billboard Japan Top Albums Sales: Quit or Quiet, Ciao, Fake Kings, The Dark Black Groove, Spade 3, Quest, Love.)	Billboard Japan Hot Albums (Note: Week references for Billboard Japan Hot Albums: Spade 3, Quest, Love,)	Sales
Quit or Quiet	Released: July 4, 2012; Label: Crux, Roof Top; Format: CD, digital download	21	21	—	11,022
Ciao, Fake Kings	Released: December 11, 2013; Label: VAP; Format: CD, digital download	23	20	—	10,687
The Dark Black Groove	Released: March 4, 2015; Label: VAP; Format: CD, digital download	33	39	—	5,323
Spade 3	Released: March 16, 2016; Label: VAP; Format: CD, digital download	23	19	32	4,062

==== Compilation albums ====
Title	Album details	Peak chart positions			Sales
Title	Album details	Oricon Albums Chart	Billboard Japan Top Albums Sales	Billboard Japan Hot Albums	Sales
Love	Released: March 29, 2017; Label: VAP; Format: CD, digital download	54	44	78	1,967

==== Mini-albums ====
Title	Album details	Peak chart positions			Sales
Title	Album details	Oricon Albums Chart	Billboard Japan Top Albums Sales	Billboard Japan Hot Albums	Sales
On the Other Hand, The Russia Is...	Released: September 15, 2010; Label: Crux, Roof Top; Format: CD, digital download	—	—	—	
Waltz with Valkyrie	Released: July 6, 2011; Label: Crux, Roof Top; Format: CD, digital download	157	—	—	1,463
Quest	Released: August 17, 2016; Label: VAP; Format: CD, digital download	20	19	52	3,429

=== Singles ===
Title	Year	Peak chart positions		Sales	Album
Title	Year	Oricon Singles Chart	Billboard Japan Hot 100 (Note: Week references for Billboard Japan Hot 100: "Would You Be My Valentine?", "Velocity", "Crowds", "Hopes Bright", "Insight/Ledger".)	Sales	Album
"Paranoia"	2011	77	—	1,269	Quit or Quiet
"Kiddie"	2012	29	—	3,167	Quit or Quiet
"Would You Be My Valentine?"	2013	20	12	4,815	Non-album single
"Velocity"	2013	39	29	4,107	Non-album single
"Crowds"	2013	28	18	9,905	Non-album single
"Hopes Bright"	2014	26	30	3,961	The Dark Black Groove
"Insight"	2015	34	40	4,602	Spade 3
"Ledger"	2015	34	—	4,602	Spade 3

=== Guest appearances ===
List of non-single guest appearances, showing year released and album name
Title	Year	Album	Ref.
"White Ash"	2014	Rock and Sympathy: Tribute to The Pillows	
