= Tsunagu =

- Regular edition cover

Single by Arashi

from the album Untitled
- B-side: "Reach for the sky (Ten made Todoke)"; "Dakishimetai"; "Under the radar"; "Oki ni Mesu mama"
- Released: June 28, 2017
- Recorded: 2017
- Genre: Pop rock
- Length: 31:51
- Label: J Storm
- Composers: Peter Nord, Kevin Borg, Hirofumi Sasaki
- Lyricist: paddy

Arashi singles chronology
"I'll Be There" (2017)	"Tsunagu" (2017)	"Doors (Yūki no Kiseki)" (2017)

"Tsunagu" is the 52nd single by Japanese boy band Arashi. It was released on June 28, 2017 under their record label J Storm. "Tsunagu" is the theme song for the film Shinobi no Kuni starring Arashi member Satoshi Ohno. The single sold over 380,000 copies in its first week and topped the weekly Oricon Singles Chart. The single was certified Platinum by the Recording Industry Association of Japan (RIAJ).

== Single information ==
"Tsunagu" was released in two editions: a regular edition and a limited edition. The regular edition contains the B-sides "Reach for the sky ~Ten made Todoke~", "Dakishimetai", and "Under the radar", and the instrumentals for all four tracks. The limited edition contains the music video and making-of for "Tsunagu", the B-side "Oki ni Mesu mama" and its instrumental, and a 16-page lyrics booklet . The album jacket covers for the two versions are different.

"Tsunagu" was used as the theme song for the film Shinobi no Kuni starring Arashi member Satoshi Ohno. "Reach for the sky ~Ten made Todoke~" was used as the campaign song for JAL "Early Bird Campaign 2017".

== Chart performance ==
"Tsunagu" debuted at number twenty-four on the Billboard Japan Hot 100 chart on May 29, 2017. It dropped to number fifty-four in June and rose to number eighteen on July 3. The following week, the song climbed seventeen spots and peaked at number one. The single debuted at number one on the Oricon daily singles chart selling, 225,153 copies upon its release and selling 389,311 copies by the end of the week, topping the Oricon weekly singles chart. The single debuted at number one on the Billboard Japan's top single sales chart selling 414,810 copies in its first week. In June 2017, the single was certified platinum by RIAJ for shipments of 250,000 units.

== Track listing ==
Regular Edition
No.	Title	Lyrics	Music	Arrangement	Length
1.	"Tsunagu"	paddy	Peter Nord; Kevin Borg	Nord; Hirofumi Sasaki	4:09
2.	"Reach for the sky (Ten made Todoke)" (Reach for the sky 〜天までとどけ〜)	RUCCA	Simon Janlöv; Funk Uchino	Hitoshi Fujima	4:03
3.	"Dakishimetai" (抱きしめたい)	IROCO-STAR	Janlöv; Mr.Mustard	Wataru Maeguchi	3:55
4.	"Under the radar"	Yoshiwazu Ichikawa	Kevin Charge; Erik Lidbom	Charge	3:49
5.	"Tsunagu" (instrumental)				4:09
6.	"Reach for the sky (Ten made Todoke)" (instrumental)				4:03
7.	"Dakishimetai" (instrumental)				3:55
8.	"Under the radar" (instrumental)				3:45
Total length:					31:51

Limited Edition
No.	Title	Lyrics	Music	Arrangement	Length
1.	"Tsunagu"				4:09
2.	"Oki ni Mesu mama" (お気に召すまま)	WINESS	Justin Reinstein; Saw Arrow	Reinstein	4:43
3.	"Oki ni Mesu mama" (instrumental)				4:40
4.	"Tsunagu (video clip + making)"
Total length:					13:33

== Charts and certifications ==
=== Weekly charts ===
Chart (2017)	Peak position
Japan (Oricon Singles Chart)	1
Japan (Billboard Japan Hot 100)	1
Japan (Billboard Japan Top Single Sales)	1

=== Certifications ===
Region	Certification	Certified units/sales
Japan (RIAJ)	Platinum	250,000^{^}
^{^} Shipments figures based on certification alone.

== Release history ==
Country	Release date	Label	Format	Catalog
Japan	June 28, 2017	J Storm	CD+DVD	JACA-5667-5668
Japan	June 28, 2017	J Storm	CD	JACA-5669
Taiwan	July 21, 2017	Avex Asia	CD+DVD	JAJSG27081/A
Taiwan	July 21, 2017	Avex Asia	CD	JAJSG27081
