= Ai o Sakebe =

2015 single by Arashi

- Regular edition cover

Single by Arashi
- B-side: "Yume ni Kakeru"; "Mr. Lonely"; "It's Good to Be Bad"; "I Say"
- Released: September 2, 2015
- Recorded: 2015
- Genre: Pop
- Length: 36:02 (Regular edition); 21:42 (Limited edition)
- Label: J Storm
- Songwriter(s): 100+

Arashi singles chronology
"Aozora no Shita, Kimi no Tonari" (2014)	"Ai o Sakebe" (2015)	"Fukkatsu Love" (2016)

"Ai o Sakebe" (愛を叫べ) is the 47th single by Japanese boy band Arashi. It was released on September 2, 2015 under their record label J Storm. "Ai o Sakebe" was used as the background song for the Recruit Zexy commercial. The single sold 462,550 copies in its first week and topped the weekly Oricon Singles Chart. With over 519,000 copies sold, the single was certified Double Platinum by the Recording Industry Association of Japan (RIAJ). "Ai o Sakebe" placed 12th on Oricon's 2015 yearly singles ranking.

== Single information ==
The single was released in two editions: a first press/limited edition and a regular edition. The regular edition contains the B-sides "It's good to be bad", "Yume ni Kakeru", and "I say" and the instrumentals for all four tracks. The first press/limited edition contains the B-sides "Yume ni Kakeru" and "Mr Lonely", instrumentals for "Ai o Sakebe" and "Mr Lonely", and a 20-page lyrics booklet. It also includes the music video and making-of for "Ai o Sakebe", the choreography video for "Ai o Sakebe", and a Japan Airlines (JAL) aircraft design unveiling video. The limited edition JAL aircraft was designed by Arashi member Ohno Satoshi for JAL's "Fly to 2020" campaign. The album jacket covers for both versions are different.

"Ai o Sakebe" was used as the background song for the Recruit Zexy commercial. "Yume ni Kakeru" was used as the campaign song for JAL "Fly to 2020".

== Track listing ==
Regular edition
No.	Title	Lyrics	Music	Arrangement	Length
1.	"Ai o Sakebe" (愛を叫べ)	100+	100+	Hirofumi Sasaki	4:41
2.	"It's Good to Be Bad"	Shigeo; eltvo	Didrik Thott; Octobar	Octobar	4:47
3.	"Yume ni Kakeru" (ユメニカケル)	Takahiro Furukawa; Takashi Ogawa; John World	Furukawa	ha-j	4:48
4.	"I Say"	Tomokazu Miura	sk-etch; BERT; ROLF	sk-etch	3:45
5.	"Ai o Sakebe" (instrumental)				4:41
6.	"It's Good to Be Bad" (instrumental)				4:47
7.	"Yume ni Kakeru" (instrumental)				4:48
8.	"I Say" (instrumental)				3:41
Total length:					36:02

Limited edition CD
No.	Title	Lyrics	Music	Arrangement	Length
1.	"Ai o Sakebe"	100+	100+	Sasaki	4:40
2.	"Yume ni Kakeru"	Furukawa; Ogawa; World	Furukawa	ha-j	4:48
3.	"Mr. Lonely"	Pink Wolf; Trevor Ingram	Ingram; Kanata Okajima; Stephen Rudden	Ingram; A.K.Janeway	3:48
4.	"Ai o Sakebe" (instrumental)				4:40
5.	"Mr. Lonely" (instrumental)				3:44
Total length:					21:42

Limited edition DVD
No.	Title	Length
1.	"Ai o Sakebe video clip" (「愛を叫べ 」 （ビデオ・クリップ）)
2.	"Ai o Sakebe making-of" (「愛を叫べ 」 （メイキング）)
3.	"Ai o Sakebitaku Naru (choreography video)" (「“愛を叫びたくなる” 振付ビデオ」)
4.	"JAL aircraft design unveiling video" (JAL 特別塗装機お披露目会)

== Chart performance ==
The single debuted at number one on the Oricon daily singles chart selling 242,023 copies upon its release and selling 462,550 copies by the end of the week, topping the Oricon and Billboard Japan weekly singles charts. The single sold 29,131 copies in its second week and stayed in the top ten for three consecutive weeks. With 519,330 copies sold, the single placed 12th on Oricon's 2015 yearly singles ranking and second on Billboard Japan's top singles year-end list.

== Charts and certifications ==
=== Charts ===
Chart (2015)	Peak position
Japan Oricon single Daily Chart	1
Japan Oricon single Weekly Chart	1
Japan Oricon single Yearly Chart	12
Billboard Japan Hot 100	1
Billboard Japan Top Single Sales Year End	2

=== Sales and certifications ===
Country	Provider	Sales	Certification
Japan	RIAJ	530,330	Double Platinum

== Release history ==
Country	Release date	Label	Format	Catalog
Japan	September 2, 2015	J Storm	CD+DVD	JACA-5472-5473
Japan	September 2, 2015	J Storm	CD	JACA-5474
Taiwan	September 18, 2015	Avex Asia	CD+DVD	JAJSG27068/A
Taiwan	September 18, 2015	Avex Asia	CD	JAJSG27068
South Korea	September 23, 2015	S.M. Entertainment	CD	SMKJT0566
