= Ai Ai Syndrome =

EP by Charisma.com
- Released: July 10, 2013
- Recorded: 2012–2013
- Genre: electropop, hip hop
- Length: 31:40
- Language: Japanese
- Label: Lastrum

Charisma.com chronology
Ai Ai Syndrome (2013)	Distopping (2014)

Singles from Ai Ai Syndrome
- 1. "Hate" Released: June 16, 2013

Ai Ai Syndrome (アイ アイ シンドローム, Ai Ai Shindorōmu) is the debut extended play by Japanese musical group Charisma.com. It was released on July 10, 2013, through independent record label Lastrum.

== Background and development ==
Charisma.com formed in 2011, featuring rapper Itsuka and DJ Gonchi. The group first started working together as a three-person unit featuring a singer, however started as Charisma.com when she left. The group uploaded a video of their song "Hate" to YouTube on July 9, 2012, and followed this with "George" on February 7, 2013. Due to the popularity of these videos, the group were able to debut as musicians.

In February, Charisma.com released a special CD available exclusively at concerts featuring three songs from the extended play: "Hate", "Yugalove" and "George". They announced the release of Ai Ai Syndrome on May 16, 2013.

== Writing and production ==
The title Ai Ai Syndrome is a pun on both the English word I and the Japanese word ai (愛; "love"), and refers to narcissism. The title also has a secondary pun on the word aye-aye, referring to how Itsuka thinks of herself as being loud like a monkey.

The songs were created after Itsuka received tracks she requested from musicians and trackmakers, after which she would add lyrics and a melody to them. Many of the songs were inspired by the members' lives as office ladies, such as "OLHero" which specifically dealt with daily conversations at offices.

== Promotion and release ==
The release's leading track was the song "Hate", which received a music video in June 2013. The video features men in black bodysuits, which were intended to represent the bad aspects inside of people, such as jealousy and weakness. The song reached number 48 on the Billboard Japan Hot 100 singles chart.

To promote Ai Ai Syndrome, Charisma.com performed a series of in-store events: Ōmiya Arche HMV in Saitama on July 15, Tower Records Nagoya on July 27 and Tower Records Shinjuku in Tokyo on August 11. The group held a release party and concert at the Under Deer Lounge in Tokyo on August 16, 2013. On August 29, Charisma.com made an appearance at the Louis Vuitton special exhibition at the Tokyo Station Hotel, Timeless Muses, where they performed a hologram concert.

In November 2013, Charisma.com performed their first single-billed tour, Gokigenyō, Charisma.com desu. (ごきげんよう、Charisma.comです。; "Nice to Meet You, We're Charisma.com"), a two-date tour with performances in Tokyo and Osaka.

== Critical reception ==
Ai Ai Syndrome was well-received critically, being awarded at the 2014 CD Shop Awards for best Kantō region artist. The release impressed iTunes Japan staff, who listed them in their annual list of new artists who they expect to break into mainstream music in 2014.

Fumiaki Amano of Skream! praised Itsuka's lyrics on top of "heavy and aggressive tracks" as "sharp", feeling that their strength were in the mix of cuteness with the lyrical content dealing with the dark side and contradictions in society, and praised "OLHero" for its emotiveness. Jun Shiozawa was worried that the band's concept of an office lady rap unit was gimmicky until listening to Ai Ai Syndrome. He praised the group's "hybrid sound" and lyrical content, describing Itsuka's rapping skills as sharp and smooth. CDJournal reviewers praised the release's lyrics in particular.

What's In? author Masaya Kondo described as Ai Ai Syndrome as being targeted more towards women, and dealing more exclusively with female and office themes compared to the more universal content on their debut studio album Distopping.

== Track listing ==
No.	Title	Lyrics	Music	Length
1.	"Hate"	Itsuka	Itsuka, Takashi Morio	3:01
2.	"Now"	Itsuka	Yasuhito Yamada, Itsuka	4:28
3.	"Yugalove" (歪LOVE, "Warped Love")	Itsuka	Mana-B, Itsuka	3:07
4.	"Lifefull"	Itsuka	Yamada, Itsuka	4:05
5.	"Automade"	Itsuka	Itsuka, Yamada	4:29
6.	"Menhera Busu" (メンヘラブス, "Mentally Ill Ugly Girl")	Itsuka	Yamada, Itsuka	4:13
7.	"George"	Itsuka	Yamada, Itsuka	3:36
8.	"OLHero"	Itsuka	Nagomu Tamaki, Itsuka	4:41
Total length:				31:40

== Charts ==
Charts	Peak position
Japan Oricon weekly albums	52

=== Sales ===
Chart	Amount
Oricon physical sales	4,000

== Release history ==
Region	Date	Format	Distributing Label	Catalogue codes
Japan	July 10, 2013	CD, digital download	Lastrum	LACD-0239
Japan	July 24, 2013	Rental CD	Lastrum	LACD-0239
Japan	April 26, 2014	LP record	T-Annex	TANX-10001
