= Tempura Kidz =

Japanese pop group

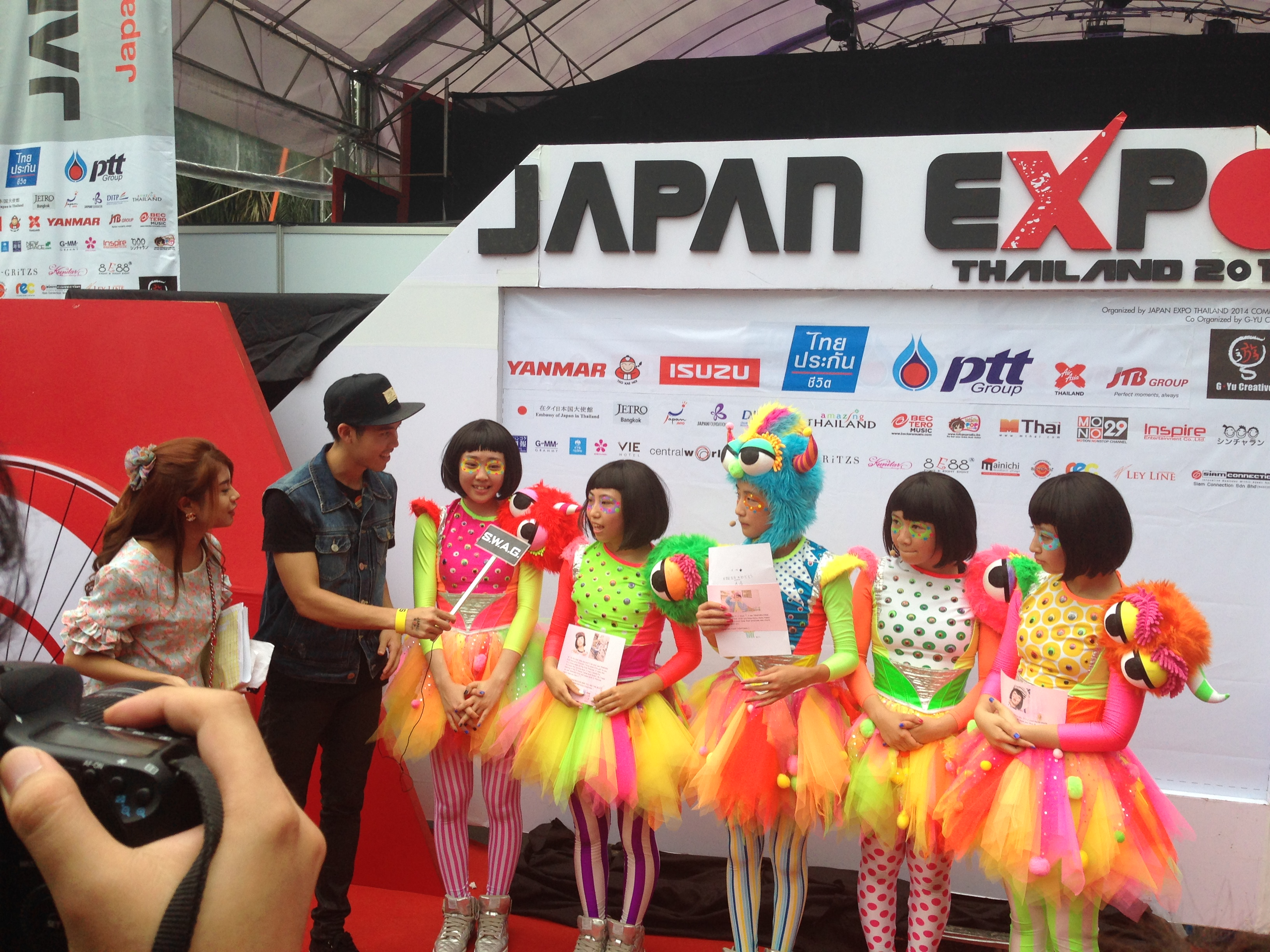
- Tempura Kidz in 2014.

Background information
- Origin: Japan
- Genres: J-pop, bubblegum pop, EDM, techno-pop
- Years active: 2012–2021
- Label: Sony Music Japan
- Members: Karin
- Past members: Nanaho; Yu-ka; Ao; P→★
- Website: tempurakidz.asobisystem.com

Tempura Kidz (stylized as TEMPURA KIDZ) was a Japanese pop dance and vocal group formed by four girls and one boy managed by Asobi System and signed with the Sony Music Japan label. They started their career as back-up dancers for Kyary Pamyu Pamyu, and have toured with her since late 2011. Their songs are produced by Ram Rider. The group debuted on November 13, 2012, with the music video for their first song "Cider Cider", which was produced by Ram Rider. In January 2013, they released their first digital single "Strobe", used as ending theme song for the anime Chō Soku Henkei Gyrozetter. Two months later, on March 6, Tempura Kidz made their physical debut with the release of their first single "One Step" produced by Nishi-ken. On March 26, 2018, member Nanaho graduated from Tempura Kidz. Tempura Kidz continued to perform as a four-person group until the graduation of Yu-ka, P→★ and Ao in March 2021.

The group is supervised by Maiko, a dancer and choreographer for Kyary Pamyu Pamyu.

The band provided a song "Tabechaitaino" for the Japanese dub of Cloudy with a Chance of Meatballs 2 and voices a marshmallow.

Their single "LOLLiPOP" is featured in the 2024 film Sonic the Hedgehog 3. The original music video for this song in 2015 featured pro wrestler Shinsuke Nakamura a year before he moved to WWE in 2016, becoming a Royal Rumble winner and 3-time United States champion.

== Members ==
- Karin (KARIN), born September 2, 1998 (age 28)

== Former Members ==
- Nanaho (NaNaHo), born May 25, 1998 (age 28) — Nanaho graduated from Tempura Kidz on March 26, 2018, at age 20, she was 14 when the group started
- Yu-ka (YU-KA), born November 14, 1998 (age 27) — former leader of the group
- Ao (AO), born January 2, 1999 (age 27) — former member of J Dee'Z and Misia's backing dancer
- P→★ (P-chan), born August 30, 1999 (age 27) — the only boy among members

== Discography ==
=== Singles ===
No.	Title	Release date	Oricon Weekly Single Chart
—	"Strobe" (ストロボ): digital single	January 16, 2013	—
1	"One Step" (ONE STEP)	September 6, 2013	83
2	"Happy Natsu Matsuri" (はっぴぃ夏祭り) (Happy summer festival): Chosoku Henkei Gyrozetter ending	July 10, 2013	96
—	"Tabechaitai no" (たべちゃいたいの) (I want to eat): digital single	November 13, 2013	—
—	"Miira Killer" (ミイラキラー) (Mummy Killer): collaborative digital single with Charisma.com	August 6, 2014	—
—	"Sukisuki! Tenpura KIDZ" (スキスキ！TEMPURA KIDZ) (Skiski! TEMPURA KIDZ): collaborative digital single with Angry Birds Fight!	May 7, 2015	—
3	"Lollipop" (LOLLiPOP)	August 5, 2015	—
—	"Find a Way" (Find A Way): digital single	January 20, 2019	—
—	"Ukiyo" (UKIYO): collaborative digital single with Moe Shop	June 17, 2019	—
—	"Tapi Tapi" (タピ・タピ): collaborative digital single with Moe Shop	August 27, 2019	—

=== Albums ===
Title	Release date	Oricon Weekly Album Chart
Minna no Dance Uta (みんなのだんすうた): cover album	March 12, 2014	184
Tenkomori (てんこもり)	September 16, 2015	126

=== Music videos ===
Title
Vegetarhythm^{[A]} (by Vegeta Girls and Mayuki Yuko)
Cider Cider
Happy Natsu Matsuri
One Step
Suimin Busoku ~need more sleep~
13-nichi no Kinyōbi^{[B]} (by Hasta La Vista feat. Tempura Kidz)
Iinadzuke Blue ^{[B]} (by Charisma.com)
Miira Killer (by Tempura Kidz vs. Charisma.com)
Mask Mask
Miira Killer (by Tempura Kidz × Shinsuke Nakamura)
Like-Like
SKYWALKER^{[C]} (by SHIKLAMEN)
LOLLiPOP
I Like It (by Tempura Kidz × easyFun & A. G. Cook)
Dreamy Wonder
EM^{[D]} (by T-UP from P336 BAND)
LAY YOUR HANDS ON THE ”SUN"^{[E]} (by Boom Boom Satellites)

^{[A]} As a dance group named Vegikko Dancers (べじっ子だんさーず).
^{[B]} As backing dancers.
^{[C]} Only P→★ as backing dancer.
^{[D]} Only Ao as Japanese teacher.
^{[E]} Special participation.
