= Bagutte Iijan =

- Type A cover

Single by HKT48
- B-side: Hitsuzenteki Koibito; Hakusen no Uchigawa de (Type A); Boku Dake no Hakujitsumu (Type B); Kiss ga Tōsugiru yo (Type C); HKT48 Family (Theater Edition)
- Released: February 15, 2017
- Genre: J-pop
- Label: Universal Music
- Songwriters: Yasushi Akimoto (lyrics); Jimaemon (music)
- Producer: Yasushi Akimoto

HKT48 singles chronology
"Saikō Kayo" (2016)	"Bagutte Iijan" (2017)	"Kiss wa Matsushikanai no Deshōka?" (2017)

Music videos
- "Bagutte Iijan" (バグっていいじゃん) on YouTube
- "Hitsuzenteki Koibito" on YouTube
- "Boku Dake no Hakujitsumu" on YouTube
- "Kiss ga Tōsugiru yo" on YouTube

"Bagutte Iijan" (バグっていいじゃん) is the 9th single by the Japanese idol girl group HKT48. It was released on February 15, 2017. The title song is used as the opening theme of the animated television series Kamiwaza Wanda. The choreographic center is performed by Rino Sashihara.

The single was number-one on the Oricon Singles Chart and was also number-one on the Billboard Japan Hot 100.

Unlike other singles, this song was not performed on AKB48 SHOW. (Note: Due to copyright issues, HKT48 did not performed the song on AKB48 Show!. The full version music video will only be released on August 3, 2017 (except for countries where YouTube Red is in force).)

== Background and Release ==
Information about "Bugute Iijan" was released on September 26, 2016 on the streaming service SHOWROOM in the "HKT48 8th Single "Supreme?" Special!", where the selected members and center position were announced. Eight members were selected for the first time: Misaki Aramaki, Mariaki Imamura, Kyoka Komada, Asuka Tomiyoshi, and 4th term research students Ayaka Oda, Chika Takeda, Oto Jitoe, and Amane Tsukitashi, and Yuki Shimono was selected for the 1st single "Suki! Suki! Skip!.

Compared to the previous album, Yui Kamishina, Mai Fuchigami, and Heki Yui Motomura, as well as Aika Tada, Meiru Tajima, Natsumi Matsuoka, and Madoka Moriyasu, who had been selected in all singles since their 1st single, Miku Tanaka, and Miku Yabu, who had been selected in all singles since they joined the group, were selected in all singles since their graduation. (This was the last single before her graduation from the group.) Meiru Tajima, Natsumi Matsuoka, Madoka Moriyasu, Miku Tanaka, and Nako Yabuki, who had been selected for every single since she joined the group, were not selected.

In the above-mentioned program, it was also announced that the song would be used as the opening theme song for the TV anime "Kamiwaza Wanda" (TBS) HKT48's previous anime theme song was "Katashii no Karaage" ("One Love's Karaage"), which was used as the ending theme for "My Little Pony - Tomodachi wa Mahou" (TV Tokyo). (TV Tokyo), and "Katashii no Karaage" (under the name "Amakuchi Hime," "Suki! Suki! Skip! ), and it is the first time for the title song to be released under the name "HKT48" or as the title song of a single.

Rino Sashihara plays the center position in this album Under the name of AKB48, she has played the center position in "Koisuru Fortune Cookie", "Halloween Night", and "LOVE TRIP/shiawase wo sharasai", the title songs of which were all selected by the AKB48 single general election results. This is the first time for Sashihara to play the center in the name of HKT48, although she has played the center of the title song of a single before. The reason why Sashihara was chosen as the center for this song was due to the fact that it was the theme song of an anime for children, and the intention was that it would be better for Sashihara, who is well known, to take the center role.

The song was broadcast before dawn on January 1, 2017 in "CDTV Special! New Year's Eve Premier Live 2016→2017" (TBS), where it was performed for the first time. The common coupling song "必然的恋人" was the theme and thought of "another title song" and was distributed in advance starting February 8, 2017. In addition, a "HKT48 original sticker" giveaway was held for one day only on February 8 at iTunes Store and Recochoku.

== Track listing ==
=== Type-A ===
CD
No.	Title	Length
1.	"Bagutte Iijan (バグっていいじゃん)"	3:44
2.	"Hitsuzenteki Koibito (必然的恋人)"	3:40
3.	"Hakusen no Uchigawa de (白線の内側で)"	3:42
4.	"Bagutte Iijan (バグっていいじゃん)" (Instrumental)	3:44
5.	"Hitsuzenteki Koibito (必然的恋人)" (Instrumental)	3:40
6.	"Hakusen no Uchigawa de (白線の内側で)" (Instrumental)	3:44

DVD
No.	Title	Length
1.	"Bagutte Iijan (バグっていいじゃん) Music Video"
2.	"Hitsuzenteki Koibito (必然的恋人) Music Video"
3.	"HKT48 to Keiyaku Kekkon (HKT48と契約結婚) Vol.1"

=== Type-B ===
CD
No.	Title	Length
1.	"Bagutte Iijan (バグっていいじゃん)"	3:44
2.	"Hitsuzenteki Koibito (必然的恋人)"	3:40
3.	"Boku Dake no Hakujitsumu (僕だけの白日夢)"	3:55
4.	"Bagutte Iijan (バグっていいじゃん)" (Instrumental)	3:44
5.	"Hitsuzenteki Koibito (必然的恋人)" (Instrumental)	3:40
6.	"Boku Dake no Hakujitsumu (僕だけの白日夢)" (Instrumental)	3:57

DVD
No.	Title	Length
1.	"Bagutte Iijan (バグっていいじゃん)"
2.	"Boku Dake no Hakujitsumu (僕だけの白日夢) Music Video"
3.	"HKT48 to Keiyaku Kekkon (HKT48と契約結婚) Vol.2"

=== Type-C ===
CD
No.	Title	Length
1.	"Bagutte Iijan (バグっていいじゃん)"	3:44
2.	"Hitsuzenteki Koibito (必然的恋人)"	3:40
3.	"Kiss ga Tōsugiru yo (キスが遠すぎるよ)"	4:11
4.	"Bagutte Iijan (バグっていいじゃん)" (Instrumental)	3:44
5.	"Hitsuzenteki Koibito (必然的恋人)" (Instrumental)	3:40
6.	"Kiss ga Tōsugiru yo (キスが遠すぎるよ)" (Instrumental)	4:13

DVD
No.	Title	Length
1.	"Bagutte Iijan (バグっていいじゃん) Music Video"
2.	"Kiss ga Tōsugiru yo (キスが遠すぎるよ) Music Video"
3.	"HKT48 to Keiyaku Kekkon (HKT48と契約結婚) Vol.3"

=== Theater Edition ===
CD
No.	Title	Length
1.	"Bagutte Iijan (バグっていいじゃん)"	3:44
2.	"Hitsuzenteki Koibito (必然的恋人)"	3:40
3.	"HKT48 Family (HKT48ファミリー)"	3:23
4.	"Bagutte Iijan (バグっていいじゃん)" (Instrumental)	3:44
5.	"Hitsuzenteki Koibito (必然的恋人)" (Instrumental)	3:40
6.	"HKT48 Family (HKT48ファミリー)" (Instrumental)	3:24

== Weekly charts ==
Chart (2017)	Peak position
Japan Singles Chart (Oricon)	1
Japan Hot 100 (Billboard)	1
