= Especia =

Japanese idol girl group

- Origin: Japan
- Genres: J-Pop; Idol; Funk; Synthpop; City Pop; Jazz Funk; R&B
- Years active: 2012–2017
- Labels: Bermuda Entertainment Japan; Tsubasa Plus
- Members: Haruka Tominaga (2012-2017); Erika Mori (2012-2017); Mia Nascimento (2016-2017)
- Past members: Akari Imai (2012); Erena Inoue (2012); Mizuki Uesaka (2012); Yuka Itatsuda (2012); Akane Sugimoto (2012-2014); Chika Sannomiya (2012-2016); Chihiro Mise (2012-2016); Monari Wakita (2012-2016)
- Website: especia.me

Especia were a Japanese idol girl group formed in 2012. They participated in the 2015 Tokyo Idol Festival. Their single "Aviator/Boogie Aroma" reached the 28th place on the Weekly Oricon Singles Chart.

== Discography ==
=== Albums ===
Release date	Title	Oricon (Note: Peak ranking on the weekly Oricon Albums Chart.)	Ref.
EP
November 30, 2012	DULCE	-	
May 22, 2013	AMARGA	52	
February 18, 2015	Primera	30	
August 10, 2016	Mirage	145	
Studio albums
May 28, 2014	GUSTO	42	
February 24, 2016	CARTA	29	
Best-of album
March 22, 2017	WIZARD	219	

=== Singles ===
Release date	Title	Oricon (Note: Peak ranking on the weekly Oricon Singles Chart.)	Ref.
	antonio silva	49	
	figueredo	34	
	santos	28	
		-	

== DVDs ==
Release date	Title	Oricon (Note: Peak ranking on the weekly Oricon DVD Chart.)	Ref.
October 1, 2014	Viva Discoteca Especia 2014	110	
