= Power of the Paradise =

- Regular edition cover

Single by Arashi
- B-side: "Hana" (花)
- Released: September 14, 2016
- Recorded: 2016
- Genre: Pop
- Length: 52:57 (Regular Edition); 4:36 (Limited Edition)
- Label: J Storm
- Songwriters: paddy, nobby, ha-j

Arashi singles chronology
"I Seek/Daylight" (2016)	"Power of the Paradise" (2016)	"I'll Be There" (2017)

"Power of the Paradise" is the 50th single by Japanese boy band Arashi. It was released on September 14, 2016 under their record label J Storm. "Power of the Paradise" was used as the theme song for NTV's news coverage of the 2016 Summer Olympics, which featured member Sho Sakurai as the main newscaster. The single sold over 420,000 copies in its first week and topped the weekly Oricon Singles Chart. The single was certified Double Platinum by the Recording Industry Association of Japan (RIAJ). "Power of the Paradise" was the 10th best-selling single of the year in Japan.

== Single information ==
"Power of the Paradise" was released in two editions: a regular edition and a limited edition. The regular edition contains the B-side "Hana", the instrumentals for the two tracks, and a secret talk in the "Hana" instrumental. The limited edition contains a DVD with a music video and making-of for "Power of the Paradise" and a 20-page lyrics booklet. The album jacket covers for the two versions are different.

"Power of the Paradise" was used as the theme song for NTV's news coverage of the 2016 Summer Olympics on NTV, which featured member Sho Sakurai as the main newscaster. This is the sixth time the group has provided the theme song for NTV's news coverage of the Summer and Winter Olympic Games.

== Track listing ==
Regular edition
No.	Title	Lyrics	Music	Arrangement	Length
1.	"Power of the Paradise"	paddy	nobby	ha-j	4:38
2.	"Hana" (花)	Ogawa Takashi	Justin Reinstein; wonder note	Hirofumi Sasaki	5:02
3.	"Power of the Paradise" (instrumental)				4:38
4.	"Hana" (instrumental)				38:39
Total length:					52:57

Limited edition
No.	Title	Lyrics	Music	Arrangement	Length
1.	"Power of the Paradise"	paddy	nobby	ha-j	4:36
2.	"Power of the Paradise" (video clip + making)
Total length:					4:36

== Chart performance ==
On the week of September 17, 2016, "Power of the Paradise" debuted at number 69 on the Japan Billboard Hot 100 and rose to number one on October 1, 2016. The single debuted at number one on the Oricon daily singles chart selling 225,928 copies upon its release and selling 422,418 copies by the end of the week, topping the Oricon weekly singles chart and Billboard Japan's top single sales chart. In September 2016, the single was certified double platinum by RIAJ for shipments of 500,000 units.

== Charts and certifications ==
=== Weekly charts ===
Chart (2016)	Peak position
Japan (Oricon Singles Chart)	1
Japan (Billboard Japan Hot 100)	1
Japan (Billboard Japan Top Single Sales)	1

=== Year-end charts ===
Chart (2016)	Peak position
Japan (Oricon Yearly Singles)	10
Japan (Billboard Japan Hot 100)	40
Japan (Billboard Japan Top Single Sales)	11

=== Certifications ===
Region	Certification	Certified units/sales
Japan (RIAJ)	2× Platinum	500,000^{^}
^{^} Shipments figures based on certification alone.

== Release history ==
Country	Release date	Label	Format	Catalog
Japan	September 14, 2016	J Storm	CD+DVD	JACA-5619-5620
Japan	September 14, 2016	J Storm	CD	JACA-5621
South Korea	October 12, 2016	S.M. Entertainment	CD	SMKJT0702
Taiwan	October 12, 2016	Avex Asia	CD+DVD	JAJSG27075/A
Taiwan	October 12, 2016	Avex Asia	CD	JAJSG27075
