= I Seek / Daylight =

"I Seek/Daylight"
- Regular edition cover

Single by Arashi
- B-side: "Tadaima" (ただいま); "supersonic"
- Released: May 18, 2016
- Recorded: 2016
- Genre: Pop
- Length: 35:36 (Regular Edition); 9:35 (Limited Edition 1); 9:35 (Limited Edition 2)
- Label: J Storm

Arashi singles chronology
"Fukkatsu Love" (2016)	"I Seek/Daylight" (2016)	"Power of the Paradise" (2016)

"I Seek/Daylight" is the 49th single by Japanese boy band Arashi. It was released on May 18, 2016 under their record label J Storm. "I seek" was used as the theme song for the drama Sekai Ichi Muzukashii Koi starring Arashi member Satoshi Ohno, and "Daylight" was used as the theme song for the drama 99.9 Keiji Senmon Bengoshi starring Arashi member Jun Matsumoto. The single sold over 737,000 copies in its first week and topped the weekly Oricon Singles Chart. "I seek/Daylight" was certified for Triple Platinum by the Recording Industry Association of Japan (RIAJ).

== Single information ==
"I seek/Daylight" was released in three editions: a regular edition and two limited editions. The regular edition contains the B-sides "Tadaima" and "supersonic", instrumentals for all four tracks, and a 10-page lyrics booklet. The limited editions contain a DVD with a music video and making-of for one of the A-side tracks, and a 16-page lyrics booklet. The album jacket covers for the three versions are different.

"I seek" was used as the theme song for the drama Sekai Ichi Muzukashii Koi starring Arashi member Satoshi Ohno, and "Daylight" was used as the theme song for the drama 99.9 Keiji Senmon Bengoshi starring Arashi member Jun Matsumoto. Daylight is Arashi's first A-side song to feature rapping by Sho Sakurai since "Face Down" in 2012. "Tadaima" was created specially to be used as the theme song for ARASHI “Japonism Show” in ARENA, Arashi's first arena tour in nine years.

== Track listing ==
Regular edition
No.	Title	Lyrics	Music	Arrangement	Length
1.	"I Seek"	ASIL	AKJ; ASIL	Tomoki Ishizuka	4:45
2.	"Daylight"	Stereograph; Sho Sakurai	Simon Janlov; Wonder Note	Hirofumi Sasaki	4:51
3.	"Tadaima" (ただいま)	Paddy	Kehn Mind	Metropolitan Digital Clique	4:59
4.	"Supersonic"	100+	Kevin Charge; David Fremberg; Youth Case	Taku Yoshioka	3:13
5.	"I Seek" (instrumental)				4:45
6.	"Daylight" (instrumental)				4:51
7.	"Tadaima" (instrumental)				4:59
8.	"Supersonic" (instrumental)				3:09
Total length:					35:36

Limited edition 1 & 2
No.	Title	Lyrics	Music	Arrangement	Length
1.	"I Seek"	ASIL	AKJ; ASIL	Ishizuka	4:45
2.	"Daylight"	Stereograph; Sakurai	Janlov; Wonder Note	Sasaki	4:49
Total length:					9:35

Limited edition 1 DVD
No.	Title	Length
1.	"I Seek" (video clip + making-of)

Limited edition 2 DVD
No.	Title	Length
1.	"Daylight" (video clip + making-of)

== Chart performance ==
The single debuted at number one on the Oricon daily singles chart, selling 406,274 copies upon its release and selling 737,951 copies by the end of the week, topping the Oricon and Billboard Japan weekly singles charts. The single sold 48,420 copies in its second week and stayed in the top ten for three consecutive weeks.

== Charts and certifications ==
=== Charts ===
Chart (2016)	Peak position
Billboard Japan Hot 100	1
Billboard Japan Top Single Sales	1
Japan Oricon single Daily Chart	1
Japan Oricon single Weekly Chart	1

=== Sales and certifications ===
Country	Provider	Sales	Certification
Japan	RIAJ	822,181	Triple Platinum

== Release history ==
Country	Release date	Label	Format	Catalog
Japan	May 18, 2016	J Storm	CD+DVD	JACA-5593-5594
Japan	May 18, 2016	J Storm	CD+DVD	JACA-5595-5596
Japan	May 18, 2016	J Storm	CD	JACA-5597
South Korea	June 8, 2016	S.M. Entertainment	CD	SMKJT0640
Taiwan	June 8, 2016	Avex Asia	CD+DVD	JAJSG27074/A
Taiwan	June 8, 2016	Avex Asia	CD+DVD	JAJSG27074/B
Taiwan	June 8, 2016	Avex Asia	CD	JAJSG27074
