= I'll Be There (Arashi song) =

- Regular edition cover

Single by Arashi
- B-side: "Round and Round"; "Unknown"; "Treasure of Life"
- Released: April 19, 2017
- Recorded: 2017
- Genre: Pop; Big band
- Length: 26:33
- Label: J Storm
- Composers: Figge Boström; Kōta Sahara
- Lyricist: Goro.T

Arashi singles chronology
"Power of the Paradise" (2016)	"I'll Be There" (2017)	"Tsunagu" (2017)

"I'll Be There" is the 51st single by Japanese boy band Arashi. It was released on April 19, 2017 under their record label J Storm. "I'll be there" was used as the theme song for the television drama Kizoku Tantei starring Arashi member Masaki Aiba. The single sold over 390,000 copies in its first week and topped the weekly Oricon Singles Chart. The single was certified Double Platinum by the Recording Industry Association of Japan (RIAJ).

== Single information ==
"I'll Be There" was released in two editions: a regular edition and a limited edition. The regular edition contains the B-sides "unknown" and "Treasure of life", and the instrumentals for all three tracks. The limited edition contains the music video and making-of for "I'll be there", the B-side "Round and Round" and its instrumental, and a 16-page lyrics booklet . The album jacket covers for the two versions are different.

"I'll Be There" was used as the theme song for the television drama Kizoku Tantei starring Arashi member Masaki Aiba. The group performed the song on the music show FNS Music Festival in Spring on March 22, 2017.

== Track listing ==
Regular edition
No.	Title	Lyrics	Music	Arrangement	Length
1.	"I'll Be There"	Goro.T	Figge Boström; Kōta Sahara	Sahara; metropolitan digital clique
2.	"Unknown"	Macoto56; Sho Sakurai	Al Swettenham; HIKARI	Taku Yoshioka
3.	"Treasure of Life"	Tutti	Erik Lidbom; Simon Janlöv	Janlöv
4.	"I'll Be There" (instrumental)
5.	"Unknown" (instrumental)
6.	"Treasure of Life" (instrumental)
Total length:					26:33

Limited edition
No.	Title	Lyrics	Music	Arrangement	Length
1.	"I'll Be There"
2.	"Round and Round"	Funk Uchino	Christofer Erixon; Josef Melin	Melin
3.	"Round and Round" (instrumental)
4.	"I'll Be There" (video clip + making)

== Chart performance ==
On April 24, 2017, "I'll be there" debuted at number sixty-one on the Billboard Japan Hot 100 chart and rose to number one on May 1, 2017. The single debuted at number one on the Oricon daily singles chart selling 225,383 copies upon its release and selling 393,555 copies by the end of the week, topping the Oricon weekly singles chart. The single debuted at number one on the Billboard Japan's top single sales chart selling 424,861 copies in its first week. In April 2017, the single was certified double platinum by RIAJ for shipments of 500,000 units.

== Charts and certifications ==
=== Weekly charts ===
Chart (2017)	Peak position
Japan (Oricon Singles Chart)	1
Japan (Billboard Japan Hot 100)	1
Japan (Billboard Japan Top Single Sales)	1

=== Sales and certifications ===
Region	Certification	Certified units/sales
Japan (RIAJ)	2× Platinum	500,000^{^}
^{^} Shipments figures based on certification alone.

== Release history ==
Country	Release date	Label	Format	Catalog
Japan	April 19, 2017	J Storm	CD+DVD	JACA-5654-5655
Japan	April 19, 2017	J Storm	CD	JACA-5656
Taiwan	May 12, 2017	Avex Asia	CD+DVD	JAJSG27079/A
Taiwan	May 12, 2017	Avex Asia	CD	JAJSG27079
South Korea	May 17, 2017	S.M. Entertainment	CD	SMKJT0782
