= Fukkatsu Love =

- Regular edition cover

Single by Arashi
- B-side: "Affection"; "Ai no Collection" (愛のCollection); "Bang Bang"; "Are You Ready Now?"
- Released: February 24, 2016
- Recorded: 2015
- Genre: Pop; dance
- Label: J Storm
- Songwriter(s): Takeuchi Mariya; Yamashita Tatsuro

Arashi singles chronology
| "Ai o Sakebe" (2015) | "Fukkatsu Love" (2016) | "I Seek/Daylight" (2016) |

"Fukkatsu Love" (復活LOVE) is the 48th single by Japanese boy band Arashi. It was released on February 24, 2016 under their record label J Storm. "Fukkatsu Love" was used as the background song for the NTT DoCoMo d hits commercial. The single sold over 485,000 copies in its first week and topped the weekly Oricon Singles Chart. "Fukkatsu Love" was certified for Double Platinum by the Recording Industry Association of Japan (RIAJ).

== Single information ==
The single was released in two editions: a first press/limited edition and a regular edition. The regular edition contains the B-sides "Ai no Collection", "Bang Bang", and "Are you ready now?", the instrumentals for all four tracks, and a 10-page lyrics booklet. The first press/limited edition contains the music video and making-of for "Fukkatsu Love", the B-side "affection" and its instrumental, and a 16-page lyrics booklet. The album jacket covers for both versions are different.

"Fukkatsu Love" was used as the background song for the NTT DoCoMo d hits commercial. The song was composed by Yamashita Tatsuro and the lyrics were written by Takeuchi Mariya. The music video was filmed at Shinagawa Season Terrace. Actor Toma Ikuta makes a guest appearance in the music video.

== Track listing ==
Regular edition
| No. | Title | Lyrics | Music | Arrangement | Length |
|---|---|---|---|---|---|
| 1. | "Fukkatsu Love" (復活LOVE) | Mariya Takeuchi | Tatsuro Yamashita | Yamashita | 4:54 |
| 2. | "Ai no Collection" (愛のCollection) | Paddy | Chris Meyer | Taku Yoshioka | 3:41 |
| 3. | "Bang Bang" | 100+ | Robert Hanna; Ninos Hanna; Jeppe Reil; Thomas Reil | Tomoki Ishizuka | 3:51 |
| 4. | "Are You Ready Now?" | Tomokazu Miura | Jeremy Hammond | Hammond | 3:53 |
| 5. | "Fukkatsu Love" (instrumental) | | | | 4:54 |
| 6. | "Ai no Collection" (instrumental) | | | | 3:41 |
| 7. | "Bang Bang" (instrumental) | | | | 3:51 |
| 8. | "Are you ready now?" (instrumental) | | | | 3:49 |
| Total length: | | | | | 32:38 |

Limited edition
| No. | Title | Lyrics | Music | Arrangement | Length |
|---|---|---|---|---|---|
| 1. | "Fukkatsu Love" (復活LOVE) | Takeuchi | Yamashita | Yamashita | 4:54 |
| 2. | "Affection" | Nobby | Nobby | Hirofumi Sasaki | 4:29 |
| 3. | "Affection" (instrumental) | | | | 4:25 |
| Total length: | | | | | 13:49 |

Limited edition DVD
| No. | Title | Length |
|---|---|---|
| 1. | "Fukkatsu Love" (video clip + making-of/special talk) |

== Chart performance ==
The single debuted at number one on the Oricon daily singles chart selling 253,254 copies upon its release and selling 485,006 copies by the end of the week, topping the Oricon and Billboard Japan weekly singles charts. The single sold 31,983 copies in its second week and stayed in the top ten for three consecutive weeks.

== Charts and certifications ==
=== Charts ===
| Chart (2016) | Peak position |
|---|---|
| Billboard Japan Hot 100 | 1 |
| Japan Oricon single Daily Chart | 1 |
| Japan Oricon single Weekly Chart | 1 |
| JpopAsia Music Video Chart | 1 |

=== Sales and certifications ===
| Country | Provider | Sales | Certification |
|---|---|---|---|
| Japan | RIAJ | 541,121 | Double Platinum |

== Release history ==
| Country | Release date | Label | Format | Catalog |
|---|---|---|---|---|
| Japan | February 24, 2016 | J Storm | CD+DVD | JACA-5577-5578 |
| Japan | February 24, 2016 | J Storm | CD | JACA-5579 |
| South Korea | March 16, 2016 | S.M. Entertainment | CD | SMKJT0640 |
| Taiwan | March 18, 2016 | Avex Asia | CD+DVD | JAJSG27072/A |
| Taiwan | March 18, 2016 | Avex Asia | CD | JAJSG27072 |
