= List of Japanese idols =

This is a list of Japanese idols; a type of celebrity in Japan. The following list includes both female and male idols as well as both solo idols and idol groups.

== Others ==
- =LOVE (group)
- ≠Me (group)
- ≒Joy (group)
- °C-ute (group)
- 3776 (group)
- 22/7 (group)
- 2o Love to Sweet Bullet (group)
- 3B Junior (group)
- 9nine (group)
- μ's (group)
- &TEAM (group)
- @onefive (group)

== A ==
- Aa! (group)
- AAA (group)
- A.B.C-Z (group)
- AKB48 (group)
- Akishibu Project (group)
- Arcana Project (group)
- Ali Project (group)
- Angerme (group)
- Appare! (group)
- Arashi (group)
- Athena & Robikerottsu (group)
- Ayumikurikamaki (group)
- Asami Abe
- Natsumi Abe
- Shizue Abe
- Yumi Adachi
- Shoko Aida
- Masaki Aiba
- Himika Akaneya
- Jin Akanishi
- Sayaka Akimoto
- Mari Amachi
- Jun Amaki
- Chihiro Anai
- Yuko Anai
- Sakura Andō
- Anza
- Hiroko Anzai
- Maria Anzai
- Yui Aragaki
- Tsugumi Aritomo
- Momoka Ariyasu
- Miyoko Asada
- Nao Asahi
- Yui Asaka
- Nana Asakawa
- Aiko Asano
- Megumi Asaoka
- Mamiko Asō
- Aqours (group)
- Haruka Ayase
- Rion Azuma

== B ==
- B.I Shadow (group)
- BaBe (duo)
- Babyraids Japan (group)
- Bakusute Sotokanda Icchome (group)
- Band Ja Naimon! (group)
- Batten Showjo Tai (group)
- Ballistik Boyz (group)
- Banzai Japan (group)
- Beatcats (group)
- Be First (group)
- BeForU (group)
- Berryz Kobo (group)
- Beyooooonds (group)
- Bi-ray (group)
- Bis (group)
- BiS Kaidan (group)
- Bish (group)
- Bite a Shock (group)
- Bon-Bon Blanco (group)
- Boysgroup (group)
- Boys and Men (group)
- Bullet Train (group)
- bump.y (group)
- Buono! (group)
- Buzy (group)
- Bonnie Pink (post-idol)
- B.O.L.T (group)

== C ==
- Camellia Factory (group)
- Canary Club (group)
- Candies (group)
- Candy Go!Go! (group)
- Candy Tune (group)
- Candye Syrup (group)
- Checkicco (group)
- Cheeky Parade (group)
- Chinpara (group)
- Chocolove from AKB48 (group)
- Chō Tokimeki Sendenbu (group)
- Chu-Z (group)
- Ciao Bella Cinquetti (group)
- ClariS (duo)
- Clear’s (group)
- CoCo (group)
- Cocoa Otoko (group)
- Coconuts Musume (group)
- College Cosmos (group)
- Country Musume (group)
- Cross Gene (group)
- Crown Pop (group)
- Cutie Street (group)
- CY8ER (group)
- Cymbals (band) (group)
- Cynhn (group)
- Agnes Chan
- Naomi Chiaki
- Yuri Chinen
- Choucho

== D ==
- D&D (group)
- D-Date (group)
- Da Pump (group)
- Da-ice (group)
- The Dance for Philosophy (group)
- Danceroid (group)
- Dancing Dolls (group)
- Dear Kiss (group)
- Def.Diva (group)
- Dempagumi.inc (group)
- Devil Anthem. (group)
- Dialogue (group)
- DISH// (group)
- DIVA (group)
- Doll Elements (group)
- Dorothy Little Happy (group)
- Dream5 (group)
- Dream Morning Musume (group)
- DXTeen
- Alisa Durbrow

== E ==
- Earth (group)
- Ebisu Muscats (group)
- Ecomoni (group)
- E-girls (group)
- Empire (group)
- Especia (group)
- Enako
- Kanako Enomoto
- ExWhyZ

== F ==
- Faky (group)
- Fantastics (group)
- Festive (group)
- First Place (group)
- Flame (group)
- Flap Girls' School (group)
- Folder5 (group)
- Four Leaves (group)
- French Kiss (group)
- Fruits Zipper (group)
- Fudanjuku (group)
- Kano Fujihira
- Miki Fujimoto
- Kyoko Fukada
- Kanon Fukuda
- Mizuki Fukumura

== G ==
- Gackt (post-idol)
- GAM (duo)
- Gang Parade (group)
- Garnidelia (duo)
- GAM
- Generations
- Girls² (group)
- Go to the Beds (group)
- Golf & Mike (duo)
- Gomattō (group)
- Guardians 4 (group)
- Maki Goto

== H ==
- Hachimitsu Rocket (group)
- Halna (group)
- Hana (group)
- Hello Pro Kenshusei (group)
- Hello! Project Kids (group)
- Hey! Say! JUMP (group)
- High-King (group)
- Hikaru Genji (group)
- Hinatazaka46 (group)
- Hinoi Team (group)
- HKT48 (group)
- Ho6la (group)
- Hōkago Princess (group)
- Hotch Potchi (group)
- HR (group)
- Mai Hagiwara
- Chitose Hajime
- Chisaki Hama
- Ayumi Hamasaki
- Yu Hasebe
- Kanna Hashimoto
- Hatsune Miku
- Hiroko Hayashi
- Aya Hirano
- Kusano Hironori
- Ryōko Hirosue
- Mieko Hirota
- Kanata Hongo
- Yui Horie

== I ==
- INI (group)
- I Ris (group)
- Ice Creamusume (group)
- Idol College (group)
- Idol Renaissance (group)
- Idoling!!! (group)
- Iginari Tohoku San
- Sayaka Ichii
- Yuri Ichii
- Miori Ichikawa
- Kaori Iida
- Raura Iida
- Riho Iida
- Haruna Iikubo
- Rina Ikoma
- Akiko Ikuina
- Erika Ikuta
- Erina Ikuta
- Toma Ikuta
- Miyuki Imori
- IMP.
- Kei Inoo
- Mao Inoue
- Waka Inoue
- Inuwasi (group)
- Saaya Irie
- Anna Iriyama
- Ayumi Ishida (b. 1948)
- Ayumi Ishida (b. 1997)
- Haruka Ishida
- Aya Ishiguro
- Kaori Ishihara
- Yujiro Ishihara
- Rika Ishikawa
- Mako Ishino
- Yōko Ishino
- Sayaka Isoyama
- Tomomi Itano
- Maiko Itō
- Ran Ito
- Sakiko Ito
- Yuna Ito
- Yukiko Iwai
- Misaki Iwasa
- Hiromi Iwasaki
- Yoshimi Iwasaki
- Karen Iwata

== J ==
- J Soul Brothers (group)
- J-Friends (group)
- Janne Da Arc (group)
- The Jet Boy Bangerz (group)
- JO1 (group)
- Johnnys (group)
- Johnny's Jr (group)
- Johnny's West (group)
- Juice=Juice (group)

== K ==
- Kamen Joshi (group)
- Kamen Rider Girls (group)
- Kamiyado (group)
- Kanjani Eight (group)
- Karen Girl's (group)
- KAT-TUN (group)
- Keyakizaka46 (group)
- King & Prince (group)
- Kids Alive (group)
- KinKi Kids (duo)
- Kira Pika (duo)
- Kis-my-ft2 (group)
- Kiss Kiss (group)
- Kitty GYM (group)
- Reon Kadena
- Keekihime
- Kazuya Kamenashi
- Moe Kamikokuryo
- Tomohiro Kamiyama
- Miyuki Kanbe
- Sayaka Kanda
- Shigeaki Kato
- Yukie Kawamura
- Tomoko Kawase
- Umika Kawashima
- Aiko Kayo
- Naoko Ken
- Noriko Kijima
- You Kikkawa
- Moa Kikuchi
- Ayumi Kinoshita
- Midori Kinouchi
- Kumi Koda
- Kyōko Koizumi
- Ayaka Komatsu
- Miho Komatsu
- Keiichiro Koyama
- Haruka Kudō
- Chiaki Kuriyama
- Koharu Kusumi
- Minako Kotobuki

== L ==
- Last Idol (group)
- Lazy (group)
- Lead (group)
- Liella! (group)
- Lil League
- LinQ (group)
- Lip's (group)
- LiSA
- Little Glee Monster (group)
- LinQ (group)
- Lip's (group)
- LM.C (duo)
- Lovely Doll (group)
- LoveSick (group)
- Lyrical School (group)
- Ann Lewis

== M ==
- Magnolia Factory (group)
- Mameshiba no Taigun (group)
- MAX (group)
- Me:I (group)
- Melon Kinenbi (group)
- Metamuse (group)
- Mercuro (group)
- MilkyWay (group)
- Mini-Moni (group)
- MiSaMo (group)
- Momoiro Clover Z (group)
- Morning Musume (group)
- Morning Musume Otomegumi (group)
- Morning Musume Sakuragumi (group)
- Morning Musume Tanjō 10nen Kinentai (group)
- Musubizm (group)
- Musukko Club (group)
- Atsuko Maeda
- Yui Makino
- Erina Mano
- Ryuhei Maruyama
- Takahisa Masuda
- Seiko Matsuda
- Jurina Matsui
- Rena Matsui
- Yuya Matsushita
- Jun Matsumoto
- Aya Matsuura
- Megumi
- Sayumi Michishige
- Mihiro
- Saori Minami
- Ayaka Miyoshi
- Nana Mizuki
- Yui Mizuno
- Moga Mogami
- Kanako Momota
- Masako Mori
- Momoe Mori
- Hiroko Moriguchi
- Chisato Moritaka
- Osamu Mukai
- Shingo Murakami
- Ayami Mutō
- Myco

== N ==
- N Zero (group)
- Naniwa Danshi (group)
- NCT Wish (group)
- Negicco (group)
- Neo Japonism (group)
- NEWS (group)
- Neverland (group)
- NGT48 (group)
- Nice Girl Project! (group)
- NiziU (group)
- NMB48 (group)
- No Sleeves (group)
- Nochiura Natsumi (group)
- Nogizaka46 (group)
- Not Yet (group)
- Nyangilas (group)
- NYC (group)
- Shoko Nakagawa
- Yuto Nakajima
- Yukie Nakama
- Yuichi Nakamaru
- Akina Nakamori
- Suzuka Nakamoto
- Miho Nakayama
- Yuma Nakayama
- Jun Natsukawa
- Miyabi Natsuyaki
- Kazunari Ninomiya
- Hikaru Nishida
- Ryo Nishikido

== O ==
- Ocha Norma (group)
- Ongaku Gatas (group)
- Onyanko Club (group)
- Orbit (group)
- Osaka Performance Doll (group)
- Otome Shinto (group)
- Mina Ōba
- Chieko Ochi
- Megumi Odaka
- Haruna Ogata
- Makoto Ogawa
- Mana Ogawa
- Natsumi Ogawa
- Noriko Ogawa
- Yōko Oginome
- Yui Ogura
- Yuko Ogura
- Kumiko Ohba
- Satoshi Ohno
- Takako Ohta
- Nana Okada (b. 1959)
- Nana Okada (b. 1997)
- Yukiko Okada
- Junichi Okada
- Chisato Okai
- Keito Okamoto
- Ai Okawa
- Momoko Okazaki
- Chiyo Okumura
- Makoto Okunaka
- Tadayoshi Okura
- Reiko Ōmori
- Ayano Ōmoto
- Judy Ongg
- Yuka Onishi
- Erena Ono
- Mikiyo Ōno
- Itsumi Osawa
- Mai Oshima
- Ryoka Oshima
- Yuko Oshima
- Aika Ota
- Hiromi Ōta
- Takako Ōta
- Shinobu Otake
- Ai Otsuka
- Nana Owada
- Shizuka Ōya

== P ==
- Paradises (group)
- Party Rockets GT (group)
- Passcode (group)
- Passpo (group)
- Perfume (group)
- Petitmoni (group)
- Phantom Siita (group)
- Piggs (group)
- Pink Babies (group)
- Pink Lady (duo)
- PureBoys (group)
- Predia (group)
- PrizmaX (group)
- Prizmmy (group)
- Psychic Fever (group)

== Q ==
- Qumali Depart

== R ==
- Rag Fair (group)
- Rainych
- Rakutenshi (group)
- The Rampage (group)
- Ray (group)
- Rev. from DVL (group)
- Ribbon (group)
- Ringwanderung (group)
- Rinrin & Ranran (duo)
- Rihwa
- Rock A Japonica (group)
- Romans (group)
- Run&Gun (group)

== S ==
- Sakurazaka46 (group)
- Sakura Gakuin (group)
- SDN48 (group)
- Sexy Zone (group)
- Ships (duo)
- Shiritsu Ebisu Chugaku (group)
- Shonentai (group)
- Shuchishin (group)
- Shugo Chara Egg! (group)
- Shūji to Akira (duo)
- SixTones (group)
- SKE48 (group)
- Snow Man (group)
- SPEED (group)
- Sphere (group)
- Starmarie (group)
- STU48 (group)
- Suitei Shoujo (duo)
- Sunmyu (group)
- Super Girls (group)
- Super Monkey's (group)
- SweetS (group)
- Sweet Steady (group)
- Noriko Sakai
- Ikue Sakakibara
- Maaya Sakamoto
- Junko Sakurada
- Sho Sakurai
- Ayaka Sasaki
- Rino Sashihara
- Hinata Satō
- Masaki Sato
- Miyu Sawai
- Erika Sawajiri
- Riho Sayashi
- Subaru Shibutani
- Daiki Shigeoka
- Pikarin Shiina
- Rumi Shishido
- Yumi Sugimoto
- Airi Suzuki
- Kanon Suzuki
- Ranran Suzuki

== T ==
- Tackey & Tsubasa (duo)
- Tacoyaki Rainbow (group)
- Taiyō to Ciscomoon (group)
- Tanpopo (group)
- Team Shachi (group)
- Team Syachihoko (group)
- Tegomass (duo)
- The Checkers (group)
- The Hoopers (group)
- The Peanuts (duo)
- TOKIO (group)
- Tokyo Girls' Style (group)
- Tokyo Performance Doll (group)
- Toraji Haiji (duo)
- Travis Japan (group)
- Triangle (group)
- TrySail (group)
- Tsuri Bit (group)
- TVXQ (duo)
- Twinklestars (group)
- Kana Tachibana
- Junnosuke Taguchi
- Mizue Takada
- Reni Takagi
- Ayahi Takagaki
- Ai Takahashi
- Yuya Takaki
- Shiori Tamai
- Yukari Tamura
- Koki Tanaka
- Reina Tanaka
- Yuya Tegoshi
- Takuya Terada
- Erika Toda
- Haruka Tomatsu
- Aki Toyosaki
- Kana Tsugihara
- Momoko Tsugunaga

== U ==
- Up Up Girls (Kakko Kari) (group)
- Yuki Uchida
- Tatsuya Ueda
- Aya Ueto
- Takako Uehara
- Uijin (group)
- Ukka
- Kan Usuki

== V ==
- V6 (group)
- v-u-den (group)
- Vanilla Beans (duo)
- Vanilla Mood (group)

== W ==
- W (duo)
- Wakana Uehara
- Wake Up, Girls!
- Wasuta (group)
- WaT (duo)
- Watarirouka Hashiritai 7 (group)
- w-inds (group)
- Wink (duo)
- Weather Girls (group)
- Whiteberry (group)
- Mayu Watanabe

== X ==
- X21 (group)

== Y ==
- Ya-ya-yah (group)
- YuiKaori (duo)
- Yumemiru Adolescence (group)
- Kota Yabu
- Hiroko Yakushimaru
- Takayuki Yamada
- Ryosuke Yamada
- Momoe Yamaguchi
- Linda Yamamoto
- Tomohisa Yamashita
- Wakana Yamashita
- Hikaru Yaotome
- Shota Yasuda
- You Yokoyama
- Soyoka Yoshida
- Miho Yoshioka
- Yui Yoshioka
- Hitomi Yoshizawa

== Z ==
- Z-1 (group)
- Zone (group)
- ZYX (group)

== Best selling ==
The following is a list of the 20 all-time best-selling Japanese idols in Japan as of 2011, according to the Japanese music television program Music Station.

Rank	Artist	Records sold
1	SMAP	32,310,000
2	Seiko Matsuda	29,510,000
3	Akina Nakamori	25,340,000
4	KinKi Kids	24,670,000
5	Speed	19,530,000
6	Arashi	19,140,000
7	Morning Musume.	16,700,000
8	Momoe Yamaguchi	16,220,000
9	Hiromi Go	15,780,000
10	Kenji Sawada	15,700,000
11	The Checkers	15,380,000
12	Miho Nakayama	14,970,000
13	Shizuka Kudō	14,870,000
14	Kyōko Koizumi	14,260,000
15	Pink Lady	13,330,000
16	Hideki Saijo	13,290,000
17	Toshihiko Tahara	12,700,000
18	Masahiko Kondō	12,670,000
19	Hikaru Genji	12,220,000
20	Tomomi Kahara	12,190,000

== See also ==
- List of Japanese gravure idols
- List of Japanese celebrities
- List of Japanese comedians
