= Sakiko Ito =

Japanese singer (born 1958)

Sakiko Ito (伊藤 咲子, Itō Sakiko, born as Sakiko Chiba on April 2, 1958) is a Japanese singer.

== Biography ==
In 1973, at the age of 15, Sakiko Ito was a contestant on the Japanese television show Star Tanjō! (A Star Is Born) and won a recording contract. The following year she debuted as an idol with the single "Himawari Musume" (The Sunflower Girl), which peaked at #20 on the Oricon chart list. In the winter of 1974 she scored her biggest hit with the song "Kogarashi No Futari" (Two In The Cold Wintry Wind), which peaked at #5 on the Oricon chart list. Other hits include "Otome no Waltz" (Waltz For The Girls) from 1975 and "Kimi Kawai Ne" (You Are Cute) from 1976. "Kimi Kawai Ne" reached the #9 spot on the Oricon chart list and with this song she made an appearance on Kohaku Uta Gassen in 1976. The backing vocals for this performance were provided by other Japanese idols such as Hiromi Iwasaki, Masako Mori, Hiromi Ota and Candies.

== See also ==
- Kayōkyoku
- Japanese idol
- List of Japanese idols
