= Star Planet =

Department of Japanese entertainment company Stardust Promotion

- Origin: Japan
- Genres: J-pop
- Years active: 2017–present
- Website: www.stardust.co.jp/talent/starplanet/

Star Planet (stylized as STAR PLANET) (formerly known as STARDUST PLANET) is a department of the Japanese entertainment company Stardust Promotion specialising in female idols. The department's predecessor was named 3B junior, which was active until 2014. From 2014, 3B Junior was reorganized into an independent Idol group, which was active until 2018. The first Stardust Planet Festival (Natsu S) was held on July 27, 2018.

== History ==
=== Stardust Planet ===
==== Groups ====
Group Name	Alias	Formation	Notes
Momoiro Clover Z (ももいろクローバーZ)	Momokuro, Momoclo, MCZ	May 17, 2008	Formerly Known as Momoiro Clover (ももいろクローバー)
Shiritsu Ebisu Chugaku (私立恵比寿中学)	Ebichū	August 4, 2009	Officially shortened to Ebichū (えびちゅう、エビ中)
Chō Tokimeki Sendenbu (超ときめき♡宣伝部)	Tokisen, Chō Tokisen	April 11, 2015	Formerly Known Tokimeki Sendenbu (ときめき♡宣伝部)
Batten Shōjo Tai (ばってん少女隊)	Basshō	June 21, 2015	Stylized in English as BATTEN GIRLS
Iginari Tohoku San (いぎなり東北産)	Tohokusan	August 9, 2015	Stylized in English as MADE IN TOHOKU
RE-GE (リージェ)		January 30, 2026	Formed through the audition program; HAJIMARE Project.

==== Former groups ====
Group name	Formation	Disbandment	Notes
3B junior	November 1, 2014	November 3, 2018	
Rock A Japonica(ロッカジャポニカ)	November 24, 2014	April 19, 2019	
Hachimitsu Rocket (はちみつロケット)	November 24, 2014	April 26, 2020	
Awww!	June 20, 2020	October 30, 2021	
Tacoyaki Rainbow (たこやきレインボー)	September 17, 2012	March 31, 2022	
B.O.L.T	July 15, 2019	April 15, 2023	
CROWN POP	August 8, 2015	August 8, 2024	
TEAM SHACHI	September 11, 2011	December 13, 2025	Formerly Known as Team Syachihoko (チームしゃちほこ)
AMEFURASSHI	November 3, 2018	March 13, 2026	Formerly known as Amefurasshi (アメフラっシ)
STAPLA Kenkyusei (スタプラ研究生)	April 23, 2022	March 21, 2026	Trainee group
LumiUnion	November 24, 2019	April 29, 2026	Formerly known as JA Namie, Namie Joshihatsu Kumiai (浪江女子発組合)
ukka	May 1, 2015	May 24, 2026	Formerly known as Sakura Ebis (桜エビ〜ず)

==== Discography ====
Releases under the name of Stardust Planet.

EP

Title	Release date	Charts
Title	Release date	JP
We Are STAR	July 21, 2018	

Music videos

Year	Title
2018	"Wer Are Star"

=== 3B Junior ===
3B Junior (3Bjunior) was a department of the third section of the Japanese entertainment company Stardust Promotion specialising in training idols. Initially serving as the company's section dedicated to training female talents under the age of 18. Since 2014, however, 3B Junior has been reorganised into an independent department dedicated to idols. Momoiro Clover and Shiritsu Ebisu Chugaku are among popular all-girl idol groups initially founded under the 3B Junior banner.

==== Members ====
Name	Birthdate	Sub-unit	Notes
Aira (愛来)	December 8, 2002 (age 23)	Okuzawamura	3b Junior center, member of Gachinko 3
Okuzawa Reina (奥澤レイナ)	February 16, 1999 (age 27)	Okuzawamura	3B Junior Leader
Nakamura Yuu (中村優)	September 15, 1999 (age 26)	Okuzawamura	
Nagayama Maari (永山真愛)	September 1, 2002 (age 23)	Okuzawamura	
Ichikawa Yuduki (市川優月)	November 2, 2003 (age 22)	Majestic 7	
Uran (うらん)	October 12, 1999 (age 26)	Majestic 7	Leader, on indefinite hiatus since January 16, 2017
Ohira Hikaru (大平ひかる)	July 23, 2002 (age 23)	Majestic 7	
Odagaki Hina (小田垣陽菜)	January 30, 2002 (age 24)	Majestic 7	
Kojima Hana (小島はな)	February 26, 2004 (age 22)	Majestic 7	
Saito Karin (斎藤夏鈴)	October 29, 2000 (age 25)	Majestic 7	
Suzuki Moeka (鈴木萌花)	February 5, 2002 (age 24)	Majestic 7	Member of Gachinko 3
Kurimoto Yuzuki (栗本柚希)	October 5, 2000 (age 25)	Leaf Citron	Member of Gachinko 3
Haduki Tomoko (葉月智子)	May 12, 1998 (age 28)	Leaf Citron	Oldest member
Nakahara Sakuya (中原咲耶)	October 1, 2004 (age 21)	Saku-chan and Jiji	Youngest member

==== Former members ====
Name	Birthdate	Sub-unit	Notes
Miyamae Reo (宮前玲央)	May 11, 2001 (age 25)		
Uchiyama Ami (内山あみ)	January 17, 2000 (age 26)	Rock A Japonica	Leader
Naito Luna (内藤るな)	December 23, 2000 (age 25)	Rock A Japonica	
Shina Ruka (椎名るか)	July 28, 2001 (age 24)	Rock A Japonica	
Takai Chiho (高井千帆)	September 20, 2001 (age 24)	Rock A Japonica	
Hirase Misato (平瀬美里)	August 6, 2002 (age 23)	Rock A Japonica	
Amemiya Kanon (雨宮かのん)	September 20, 1999 (age 26)	Hachimitsu Rocket	Leader, member of Gachinko 3
Tsukamoto Sora(塚本颯来)	November 7, 2001 (age 24)	Hachimitsu Rocket	
Mifuu (澪風)	June 1, 2000 (age 26)	Hachimitsu Rocket	
Hanayama Shiho (華山志歩)	January 24, 2000 (age 26)	Hachimitsu Rocket	
Kimino Maika (公野舞華)	December 20, 2001 (age 24)	Hachimitsu Rocket	
Harima Reina (播磨怜奈)	February 13, 2002 (age 24)	Hachimitsu Rocket	
Mori Aoba (森青葉)	May 12, 2001 (age 25)	Hachimitsu Rocket	

==== Musical groups created by 3B Junior ====
Active

- Momoiro Clover Z
  Kanako Momota, Shiori Tamai, Ayaka Sasaki, Reni Takagi
- Shiritsu Ebisu Chugaku
  Rika Mayama, Ayaka Yasumoto, Mirei Hoshina, Hinata Kashiwagi, Kaho Kobayashi, Riko Nakayama
- Team Syachihoko
  Honoka Akimoto, Haruna Sakamoto, Nao Sakura, Yuzuki Ōguro
- Tacoyaki Rainbow
  Saki Kiyoi, Kurumi Hori, Karen Negishi, Mai Haruna, Sakura Ayaki

Inactive

- Momonaki
- Creamy Parfait
- Kagajo 4S
  Reina Okusawa, Shiori Odagiri, Ari Fujimoto, Ami Uchiyama
- Minitia Bears
  Karin Saitō, Runa Naitō, Mao Kunimitsu, Meina, Ruka Shiina, Sora Tsukamoto, Chiho Takai, Hina Odagaki, Yukari Kose, Misato Hirase, Maari Takami, Shiori Ishiguro, Aira

Discography

Releases under the name of 3B Junior.

===== Singles =====
Title	Release date	Charts
Title	Release date	JP
"Nanairo no Stardust" (七色のスターダスト)	January 1, 2014	2

===== Albums =====
Title	Release date	Charts
Title	Release date	JP
3-B Jr. Petit Album (3-B Jr.ぷちアルバム)	August 30, 2008	—
Starda Last Daizenshǔ (スタダ 3Bjunior ラスト大全集)	January 1, 2014	4

===== Music videos =====
Year	Title	Director
2014	"Nanairo no Stardust"	Hideo Kawatani

===== Television shows =====
- 3B Junior Stardust Shoji (3B Juniorの星くず商事) (BS Asahi, 24 January 2015 —)

=== Helium incident ===
On February 4, 2015, it was revealed that during the recording of their main TV show 3B Junior Stardust Shoji, on January 28, a 12-year-old member (name withheld) of 3B Junior suffered from an air embolism. She lost consciousness and fell into a coma (which was a result of the air bubbles blocking the flow of blood to the brain), which was a result of inhaling huge quantities of helium as part of a game. The incident was not made public until a week later. The staff of TV Asahi held an emergency press conference in order to announce that the member had been taken to hospital and, though she had not yet recovered consciousness, was showing signs of rehabilitation such as eye movement and mobility of her limbs. Following this, police launched an investigation into the neglected safety measures. The girl has since returned to school, although no statement has been made as to whether after-effects remain.
