= Hotch =

Hotch may refer to:

- Lani Hotch, a Native American artist
- Aaron "Hotch" Hotchner, a Criminal Minds character
- Hotch Potchi, a Japanese band
