= Morisaki Win =

Burmese actor (born 1990)

- 森崎ウィン; မိုရီဆာကီဝင်း
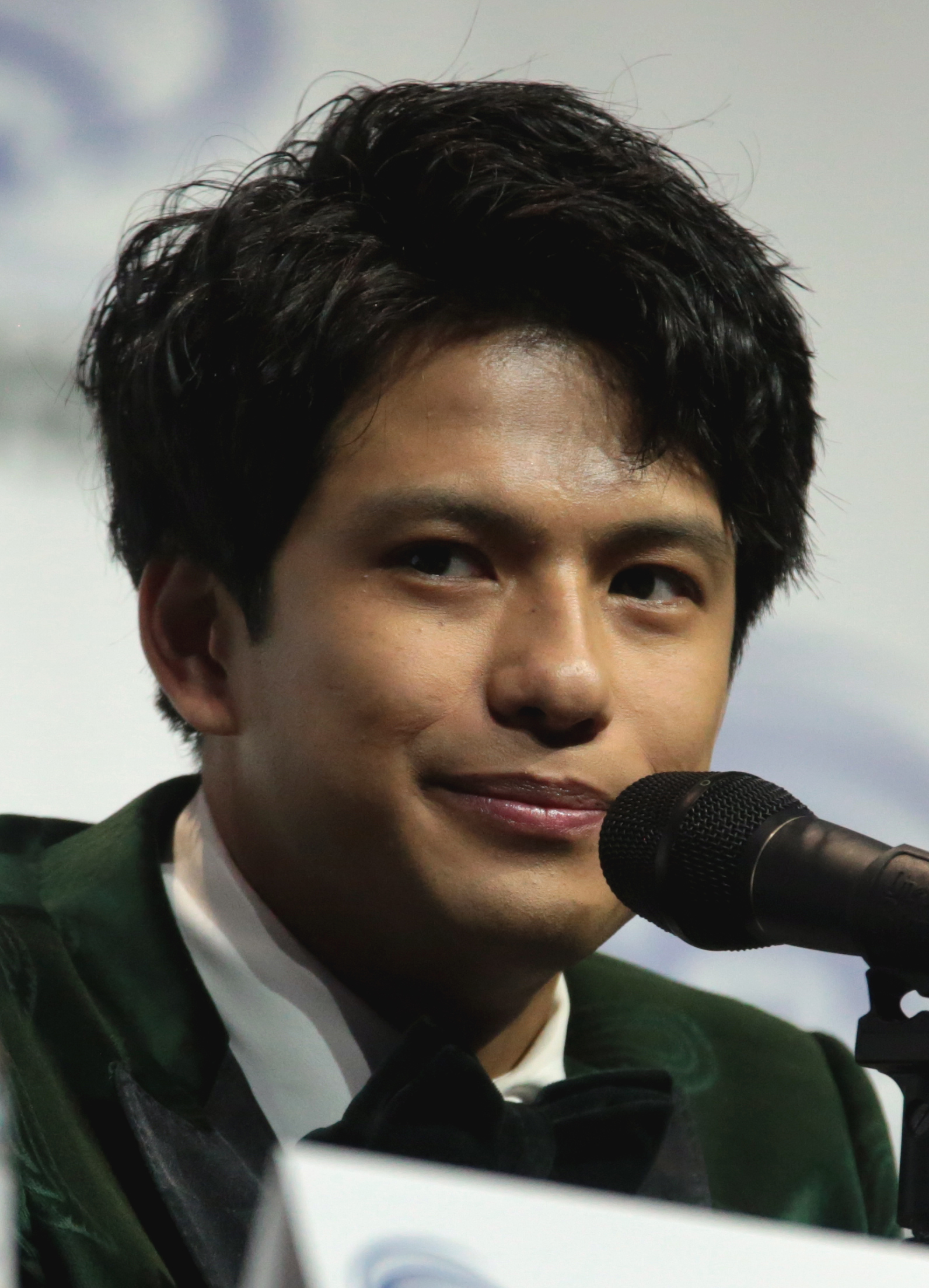
- Morisaki Win at WonderCon 2018
- Born: Win Kyaw Htoo; August 20, 1990 (age 36); Yangon, Myanmar
- Occupations: Actor; singer
- Years active: 2008–present
- Musical career
- Genre: J-pop
- Instrument: Vocals
- Label: Stardust Promotion
- Member of: PrizmaX

Morisaki Win (Japanese: 森崎ウィン; Burmese: မိုရီဆာကီဝင်း; born August 20, 1990) is a Burmese actor. He was the lead vocalist of PrizmaX, a J-pop idol boy band. He has appeared in films and television dramas in Japan and Myanmar, as well as in the American film Ready Player One (2018).

== Early life and education ==
Morisaki Win was born Win Kyaw Htoo (ဝင်းကျော်ထူး), nicknamed Ah Win, to Burmese parents in Yangon, Myanmar. His parents worked abroad in Japan during his early childhood and he lived in Myanmar with his grandmother until the age of ten, when he moved to Japan to join his parents. Morisaki was scouted at the age of 14 to join the entertainment industry.

== Career ==
In 2008, Morisaki joined J-pop idol boy band PrizmaX, managed by Stardust Promotion. In August 2010, he became a member of NAKED BOYZ together with other PrizmaX members (except Tsubasa Shimada), but withdrew at the end of the year. Morisaki made his film debut in the Yutaka Ozaki film Sherry in 2012. He was selected as the first radio personality at FM Yokohama in April 2015.

Morisaki made his Hollywood debut in Steven Spielberg's Ready Player One (2018) as Daito.

Morisaki played a small supporting role alongside Wutt Hmone Shwe Yi in a Burmese-language film, Zati Myay (ဇာတိမြေ), directed by Kyi Phyu Shin. He received 'Popular awards' from Shwe FM's 8th Anniversary on October 1, 2017.

In August 2018, he was appointed a Myanmar tourism ambassador.

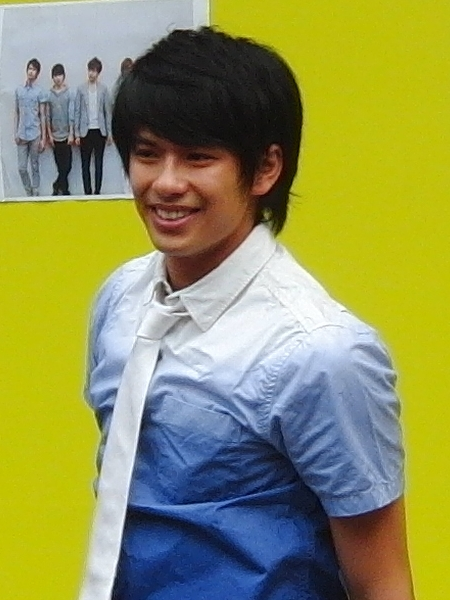
Morisaki in April 2013.

He is also main host of his own popular burmese reality show called "Win's Shooow Time" alongside co-hosts Rebecca Win & A Yein. PrizmaX members are also in the show.

In 2022, Morisaki served as the performer for the TV Asahi tokusatsu series Avataro Sentai Donbrothers with the songs “Ore koso Only One” (Opening theme) and “Don't Boo! Donbrothers“ (Ending theme).

== Filmography ==
=== Film ===
Year	Title	Role	Notes	Ref.
2009	Gokusen: The Movie	Makoto Igarashi		
2009	Parade	Makoto		
2010	Shodo Girls	Makoto Ichinose		
2010	Thriller Restaurant	Kaoru Minakami		
2011	Tengoku Kara no Yell	Kai Inoha		
2014	Sherry	Junichi Sato	Lead role	
2016	Kidan Piece of Darkness	Kentarou		
2018	Ready Player One	Daito		
2018	My Country My Home	Kimura Aung		
2018	Kujira no Shima no Wasuremono	Koa Guen	Lead role	
2018	No Matter How Much My Mom Hates Me	Kimitsu		
2019	Listen to the Universe	Masaru C Levy Anatole		
2019	Children of the Sea	Anglade (voice)		
2020	Humanoid Monster Bela	Kōsuke	Lead role	
2021	My Father's Tracks	Taiga Kitamura	Lead role	
2021	Tom and Sawyer in the City	Hiroyuki Yanagawa		
2022	Usogui: Lie Eater	Leo		
2022	Violence Action	Kaneko		
2022	Love Life			
2023	Red Shoes			
2023	Oshorin			
2024	Mobile Suit Gundam SEED Freedom	Griffin Arbalest (voice)		
2024	The Dancing Okami	Jōji		
2024	Don't Lose Your Head!	Horibe Yasubee		
2024	Maru	Mo		
2025	Love Song	Sota	Lead role; Thai-Japanese film	
2025	Ya Boy Kongming! The Movie	Ryo		
2025	Black Showman	Ryosuke Ikenaga		
2026	How to Steal the Gold			

=== Television ===
Year	Title	Role	Notes	Ref.
2008	Tokyo Girl	Takashi		
2008	Gakkō ja Oshierarenai!	Nishikawa Tomu		
2009	Gokusen 3 Graduation Special '09	Igarashi Makoto	Television special	
2009	Kamen Rider W	Dango Inamoto	2 episodes	
2012	Ghost Mama Sousasen	Kitajima Ryo	Episode 1.8	
2012–13	Ten no Hakobune	Din		
2013	Namonaki Doku	Shin Kasai		
2014	Petero no Soretsu	Shin Kasai	Episode 1	
2018	Ready Player One LIVE at SXSW	Himself		
2018	Made in Hollywood	Himself	Episode: "Ready Player One/Midnight Sun/Final Portrait"	
2018	Miss Sherlock	Bartender	Episode: "The First Case"	
2018	Hagetaka	Koichi Amenaki		
2018	Tokyo Blood Type House			
2023	The Makanai: Cooking for the Maiko House	Iwai Masaru		
2023	What Will You Do, Ieyasu?	Tokugawa Hidetada	Taiga drama	
2024	Futari Solo Camp	Gen Kinokura	Lead role	
2025	Who Saw the Peacock Dance in the Jungle?	Yukinobu Hasami		

=== Anime ===
Year	Title	Role	Notes	Ref.
2020	The Other World's Books Depend on the Bean Counter	Ciro Quellbas	He also sang the ED Theme Song	

=== Video games ===
Year	Title	Role	Notes	Ref.
2020	Death Come True	Nozomu Kuji		

=== Dubbing ===
- Cats, Mr. Mistoffelees (Laurie Davidson)

== Awards and nominations ==
Year	Award	Category	Work	Result	Ref.
2019	32nd Nikkan Sports Film Awards	Best Supporting Actor	Listen to the Universe	Nominated	
2020	43rd Japan Academy Film Prize	Newcomer of the Year	Listen to the Universe	Won	
2021	75th Mainichi Film Awards	Best Actor	The Real Thing	Nominated	
