= Ii Kurashi =

Single by Team Syachihoko

from the album Himatsubushi
- Released: May 14, 2014 (Japan)
- Genre: J-pop, pop
- Label: Unborde

Team Syachihoko singles chronology
"Ai no Chikyūsai" (2013)	"Ii Kurashi" (2014)

Music video
- Ii Kurashi on YouTube

Professional ratings
Review scores
Source	Rating
Rolling Stone Japan	3/5 stars

"Ii Kurashi" (いいくらし; "Good Living") is the sixth single by the Japanese girl idol group Team Syachihoko, released in Japan on May 14, 2014 by Unborde Records (Warner Music Japan).

== Release details ==
The single was released in four versions: a regular edition, Nagoya (a version that will only be distributed in Nagoya), Yarou Edition, and Otome Edition.

== Track listing ==
=== Nationwide (Regular Edition) ===
No.	Title	Length
1.	"Ii Kurashi" (いいくらし)
2.	"Enjoy Jinsei" (エンジョイ人生)
3.	"Daisuki!" (大好きっ！)
4.	"Ii Kurashi (off vocal)" (いいくらし （off vocal）)
5.	"Enjoy Jinsei (off vocal)" (エンジョイ人生 （off vocal）)
6.	"Daisuki! (off vocal)" (大好きっ！ （off vocal）)

=== Nagoya venue Limited Edition ===
No.	Title	Length
1.	"Ii Kurashi" (いいくらし)
2.	"Enjoy Jinsei" (エンジョイ人生)
3.	"Team Syachihoko no Yasai Seikatsu Taisou" (チームしゃちほこの野菜生活体操)
4.	"Ii Kurashi (off vocal)" (いいくらし （off vocal）)
5.	"Enjoy Jinsei (off vocal)" (エンジョイ人生 （off vocal）)
6.	"Team Syachihoko no Yasai Seikatsu Taisou (off vocal)" (チームしゃちほこの野菜生活体操 （off vocal）)

=== Yarou Limited Edition ===
No.	Title	Length
1.	"Ii Kurashi" (いいくらし)
2.	"Enjoy Jinsei" (エンジョイ人生)
3.	"Daisuki!" (大好きっ！)
4.	"Ii Kurashi (off vocal)" (いいくらし （off vocal）)
5.	"Enjoy Jinsei (off vocal)" (エンジョイ人生 （off vocal）)
6.	"Daisuki! (off vocal)" (大好きっ！ （off vocal）)

DVD: Yarou NIGHT 2014 ＠EX THEATER ROPPONGI 2014.2.21
No.	Title	Length
1.	"Katte ni Hybrid"
2.	"The Stardust Bowling"
3.	"Otome Juken Sensou"

=== Otome Limited Edition ===
No.	Title	Length
1.	"Ii Kurashi" (いいくらし)
2.	"Enjoy Jinsei" (エンジョイ人生)
3.	"Daisuki!" (大好きっ！)
4.	"Ii Kurashi (off vocal)" (いいくらし （off vocal）)
5.	"Enjoy Jinsei (off vocal)" (エンジョイ人生 （off vocal）)
6.	"Daisuki! (off vocal)" (大好きっ！ （off vocal）)

DVD: Otome Matsuri 2014＠EX THEATER ROPPONGI 2014.2.22
No.	Title	Length
1.	"Koibito wa Sniper"
2.	"Shuto Iten Keikaku"
3.	"Sokosoko Premium"

== Charts ==
Chart (2014)	Peak position
Oricon Weekly Singles Chart	2
