= Himatsubushi =

Studio album by Team Syachihoko
- Released: August 20, 2014 (Japan)
- Genre: J-pop, pop
- Length: 61:08
- Label: Warner Music Japan

Singles from Himatsubushi
- 1. "Otome Juken Sensō" Released: May 5, 2012; 2. "Shuto Iten Keikaku" Released: June 19, 2013; 3. "Ai no Chikyūsai" Released: October 30, 2013; 4. "Ii Kurashi" Released: May 14, 2014

Professional ratings
Review scores
Source	Rating
Rolling Stone Japan	4/5 stars

Himatsubushi (ひまつぶし, "Killing Time") is the first album by the Japanese girl group Team Syachihoko, released on August 20, 2014 on Warner Music Japan.

== Release ==
The single was released in 3 versions: "Kiku-ban" ("Listening Edition"), "Miru-ban" ("Watching Edition") and "Odoru-ban" ("Dancing Edition"). The latter two are limited pressings, while the Listening Edition has a limited first press edition with a special lower price ("Limited Himatsuburi Price Listening Edition").

== Reception ==
The album was nominated for the Grand Prix of the 7th CD Shop Awards.

== Track listing ==
CD
No.	Title	Notes	Length
1.	"Space Hitsumabushi supported by Zen-La-Rock" (SPACEひつまぶし supported by ZEN-LA-ROCK)
2.	"Shuto Iten Keikaku" (首都移転計画, "Capital Relocation Plan")	4th single
3.	"Dakishimete Anthem" (抱きしめてアンセム Dakishimete Ansemu)	Ending theme of the NTV series Pon!
4.	"N'Datte!" (んだって!!)
5.	"Ai no Chikyūsai" (愛の地球祭)	5th single
6.	"Ii Kurashi" (いいくらし)	6th single
7.	"I Don't Care" (アイドンケア Ai Don Kea)
8.	"Akamiso Blood" (赤味噌Blood Akamiso Buraddo)
9.	"Colors" (colors Karāzu)	Lyrics and music by Yūsuke Koide (Base Ball Bear)
10.	"Akeboshi" (明け星)
11.	"Yoroshiku Jinrui" (よろしく人類)
12.	"Country Girls" (カントリーガール Kantorī Gāru)
13.	"Otome Juken Sensō" (乙女受験戦争)	Limited (7,777 copies) live-venue distribution single

DVD (comes with the Limited "Miru" Edition only)
No.	Title	yes	Length
1.	"Oeoeo" (OEOEO)	B-side of the 5th single
2.	"Enjoy Jinsei" (エンジョイ人生)	B-side of the 6th single
3.	"Otome Juken Sensō" (乙女受験戦争)
4.	"Pizza Desu!" (ピザです! Piza Desu)	B-side of the 2nd single
5.	"Mō Chotto Hashire!!!" (もーちょっと走れ!!!)

The DVD that comes with the Limited "Miru" ("Watching") Edition contains a live recording of Team Syachihoko's concert titled "Tenchō Summit!!!: Arigatō o Tsutae Kirete Nakute" that was held on May 11, 2014 at Nakano Sun Plaza.

== Charts ==
Chart (2014)	Peak position
Oricon Weekly Albums Chart	3

== Awards ==
=== 7th CD Shop Awards ===
Year	Nominee / work	Award	Result
2015	Himatsubushi	Grand Prix	Nominated
