= Star Tanjō! =

- Genre: Talent show
- Created by: Yū Aku
- Presented by: Kinichi Hagimoto (1971-1980); Hayato Tani; Tamori; Kyu Sakamoto; Mako Ishino; YasuKiyo
- Judges: Yū Aku; Toshi Matsuda; Kōichi Morita; Yasushi Nakamura; Takashi Miki; Shunichi Tokura

Production
- Executive producer: Fumio Ikeda
- Production location: Korakuen Hall
- Running time: 55 minutes (1971-Mar 1982); 45 minutes (Apr 1982 -Sep 1983)
- Production company: Nippon Television

Original release
- Network: NNS (NTV)
- Release: October 3, 1971 – September 25, 1983

Star Tanjō! (スター誕生！, Sutā Tanjō!; lit. A Star Is Born!) is a Japanese talent show from Nippon Television that ran from 1971 to 1983. On October 24, 1982, the series was retitled Shin Star Tanjō! (新・スター誕生!, Shin Sutā Tanjō!; lit. A New Star Is Born!) to reflect its switch from monaural to stereo broadcasting. On April 3, 1983, it was again retitled to Star Tanjō! ~ Zenkoku senbatsu uta no senshuken ~ (スター誕生!～全国選抜歌の選手権～, Sutā Tanjō! ~ Zenkoku senbatsu uta no senshuken ~; lit. A Star Is Born! Nationally Selected Song Championship).

The show was created by songwriter Yū Aku, who also served as one of the judges.

In 2021, Nippon TV reused the title for the music show Nogizaka Star Tanjō!, hosted by comedy duo Pekopa and starring members of girl group Nogizaka46, which ran for two seasons. Unlike the original, the show was not a competition and only open to Nogizaka46 members, especially those of the fourth generation. It was followed by Shin Nogizaka Star Tanjō! in 2022, hosted by comedy duo Ozwald and featuring the Nogizaka46 fifth generation members, and renamed again to Nogizaka Star Tanjō! Six in 2025 following the debut of the group's sixth generation members.

== Staff ==
=== Hosts ===
- Kinichi Hagimoto (October 3, 1971 to April 6, 1980)
- Hayato Tani and Tamori (April 30, 1980 to April 5, 1981)
- Kyu Sakamoto and Mako Ishino (April 12, 1981 to January 3, 1982)
- Yasushi Yokoyama and Kiyoshi Nishikawa (January 10, 1982 to September 25, 1983)

=== Judges ===
Hagimoto, Tani/Tamori, Sakamoto/Ishino eras

- Toshi Matsuda
- Yū Aku
- Taiji Nakamura
- Shunichi Tokura
- Takashi Miki
- Koichi Morita

Nishikawa era

- Asei Kobayashi
- James Miki
- Kyōkei Ōmoto
- Katsuhisa Hattori
- Nobuhiko Obayashi
- Shinpei Asai
- Rieko Zanma
- Hiroshi Kamayatsu

YasuKiyo era

- Michiya Mihashi
- Tetsuya Gen

=== Other staff ===
- Tatsuya Takahashi and Tokyo Union (band performance)
- Akio Okamoto and Gay Stars (band performance)
- Ryōzō Yokomori (accordion)
- Hajime Doi (choreography)
- Reiko Inoue (assistant during the Hagimoto era)
- Chou a la Creme (ザ・シュークリーム, Za Shūkurīmu) (Horn Yuki, Kūko Shimizu, Yuki Kitahara, and Amami Koyama) (assistants in the beginning of the Hagimoto era)
- Rinrin & Ranran (worked with Inoue during the Hagimoto era)
- Yūko Kitamura (assistant during the Hagimoto era)
- Yukihide Kurobe
- Seiroku Saitō
- Yūjirō Fubuki
- Kōji Nishiyama
- Nobuko Shima (assistant during the Tani/Tamori era)
- Sayaka Itō (assistant during the Sakamoto/Ishino era and the first part of the YasuKiyo era)
- Rabbit Sekine (assistant during the Sakamoto/Ishino era)
- Aiko Wakamatsu
- Toshihiko Hori
- The Birds Seven Plus 1 (selected members of Nippon Television Music Academy)
- Hidetoshi Itō (narrator during the YasuKiyo era)

== Notable winners ==
- Masako Mori
- Junko Sakurada
- Momoe Yamaguchi
- Hiromi Iwasaki
- Pink Lady
- Mako Ishino
- Yoshie Kashiwabara
- Kyōko Koizumi
- Akina Nakamori
- Yukiko Okada
- Akiko Matsumoto
