= Ai no Chikyūsai =

- Cover of the Limited Edition

Single by Team Syachihoko

from the album Himatsubushi
- Released: October 30, 2013 (Japan)
- Genre: J-pop, pop
- Label: Unborde

Team Syachihoko singles chronology
"Shuto Iten Keikaku" (2013)	"Ai no Chikyūsai" (2013)	"Ii Kurashi" (2014)

Music video
- Ai no Chikyūsai on YouTube

Professional ratings
Review scores
Source	Rating
Rolling Stone Japan	3/5 stars

"Ai no Chikyūsai" (愛の地球祭; "Charity Earth Festival") is the fifth single by the Japanese girl idol group Team Syachihoko, released in Japan on October 30, 2013 by Unborde Records (Warner Music Japan).

== Release details ==
The single was released in three versions: a limited edition, Nationwide Edition (a regular edition), and Nagoya & Venue Edition (a version that will only be distributed in Nagoya and at live events).

== Track listing ==
=== Limited Edition, Nationwide (Regular) Edition ===
No.	Title	Length
1.	"Ai no Chikyūsa" (愛の地球祭)
2.	"Hatte ni Hybrid" (勝手にハイブリッド)
3.	"Owari no Hana" (尾張の華)
4.	"Ai no Chikyūsa (off vocal)" (愛の地球祭（off vocal）)
5.	"Hatte ni Hybrid (off vocal)" (勝手にハイブリッド（off vocal）)
6.	"Owari no Hana (off vocal)" (尾張の華 （off vocal）)

Limited Edition DVD: "Sokosoko Premium" Event at Akasaka Blitz 2013.07.19
No.	Title	Length
1.	"The Stardust Bowling"
2.	"Sokosoko Premium"
3.	"Triple Seven"

=== Nagoya & Venue Limited Edition ===
No.	Title	Length
1.	"Ai no Chikyūsa" (首都移転計画)
2.	"Hatte ni Hybrid" (勝手にハイブリッド)
3.	"Oeoeo" (OEOEO)
4.	"Ai no Chikyūsa (off vocal)" (愛の地球祭（off vocal）)
5.	"Hatte ni Hybrid (off vocal)" (勝手にハイブリッド（off vocal）)
6.	"Oeoeo (off vocal)" (OEOEO（off vocal）)

== Charts ==
Chart (2013)	Peak position
Oricon Weekly Singles Chart	5
