= The Stardust Bowling =

- Nagoya Major Debut Edition's cover

Single by Team Syachihoko
- B-side: "Onegai! Unborde"; "Dera Disco"(Nagoya Major Debut Edition); "Omisore Shimashita Nagoya Meshi" (Nagoya and Venue Limited Edition)
- Released: October 31, 2012 (Japan)
- Genre: J-pop, pop
- Label: Unborde

Team Syachihoko singles chronology
| "Triple Seven" (2012) | "The Stardust Bowling" (2012) | "Shuto Iten Keikaku" (2013) |

Music video
- The Stardust Bowling on YouTube

Professional ratings
Review scores
| Source | Rating |
|---|---|
| Rolling Stone Japan | 3/5 stars |

"The Stardust Bowling" (ザ・スターダストボウリング) is the third single by the Japanese girl idol group Team Syachihoko, released in Japan on October 31, 2012 by Unborde Records (Warner Music Japan).

== Promotion ==
"The Stardust Bowling" was Team Syachihoko's first major-label single. It was called the band's "Nagoya major debut single" and was accompanied by a concert tour in Nagoya City.

== Chart performance ==
The single topped at 17th position in the Oricon Weekly Singles Chart.

== Track listing ==
=== Nagoya Major Debut Edition ===
| No. | Title | Length |
|---|---|---|
| 1. | "The Stardust Bowling" (ザ・スターダストボウリング) |
| 2. | "Onegai! Unborde" (お願い！unBORDE) |
| 3. | "Dera Disco" (でらディスコ) |
| 4. | "The Stardust Bowling (instrumental)" (ザ・スターダストボウリング（Off Vocal Ver.）) |
| 5. | "Onegai! Unborde (instrumental)" (お願い！unBORDE（Off Vocal Ver.）) |
| 6. | "Dera Disco (instrumental)" (でらディスコ（Off Vocal Ver.）) |

=== Nagoya and Venue Limited Edition ===
| No. | Title | Length |
|---|---|---|
| 1. | "The Stardust Bowling" (ザ・スターダストボウリング) |
| 2. | "Onegai! Unborde" (お願い！unBORDE) |
| 3. | "Omisore Shimashita Nagoya Meshi" (いただきっニッポン！〜おみそれしましたなごやめし～) |
| 4. | "The Stardust Bowling (instrumental)" (ザ・スターダストボウリング（Off Vocal Ver.）) |
| 5. | "Onegai! Unborde (instrumental)" (お願い！unBORDE（Off Vocal Ver.）) |
| 6. | "Omisore Shimashita Nagoya Meshi (instrumental)" (いただきっニッポン！〜おみそれしましたなごやめし～（Off Vocal Ver.）) |

== Charts ==
| Chart (2012) | Peak position |
|---|---|
| Oricon Weekly Singles Chart | 17 |
