= Karin Aiba =

Japanese actress

- 相葉 香凛
- Born: June 17, 1993 (age 32); Chiba Prefecture, Japan
- Occupation(s): Actress and model
- Years active: 2008–c. 2015
- Agent: Formerly Stardust Promotion
- Awards: 2009 Bessatsu Margaret Quasi Grand Prix

Karin Aiba (相葉 香凛, Aiba Karin; born 17 June 1993, in Chiba Prefecture, Japan) is a Japanese actress and model formerly represented by Stardust Promotion.

== Biography ==
Aiba debuted in the drama Tokyo Girl: Anri Okamoto in 2008. In December of the same year, she won the "Betsu Ma-Girl Audition" at the 2009 Bessatsu Margaret Quasi Grand Prix.

Aiba's first leading role was in the film Shodō Girls: AoiAoi Sora in October 2010. She was also chosen as the finalist at the non-no Model Audition 2010 for non-no.

Aiba studied for one year in the Netherlands since February 2015. Her studies were suspended due to her activities and temporarily returned in May to model for a poster of Chiba Bank.

== Filmography ==
=== Films ===
| Year | Title | Role | Notes | Ref. |
|---|---|---|---|---|
| 2010 | AoiAoi Sora | Mako Sumita | Lead role | |

=== TV drama ===
| Year | Title | Role | Network | Notes |
|---|---|---|---|---|
| 2008 | Tokyo Girl: Anri Okamoto | Ai | BS-TBS | |
| 2009 | Ura Koe Boys | | NHK BS hi | |
| 2010 | Team Batista 2: General Rouge no Gaisen | Haruka Izumi (child) | KTV | Episodes 6 to 11 |
| 2011 | Lady: Saigo no Hanzai Profile | Shoko Katsuki (high school) | TBS | |
| 2011 | Tōi-hi no Yukue | Haruna Imanishi | WOWOW | |
| 2011 | Another Gantz | | NTV | |
| 2011 | Kyoto Chiken no Onna Dai 7 Series | Nozomi Harukawa | TV Asahi | Episode 1 |
| 2011 | Zōka no Mitsu | Ran (child) | WOWOW | |
| 2012 | Shinya mo Odoru Dai Sōsa-sen | Minako | Fuji TV | |
| 2012 | Resident – 5-nin no Kenshui | Rika Kono | TBS | Episode 3 |
| 2013 | Last Hope | Yuka Hatano | Fuji TV | Episode 2 and Final Episode |
| 2014 | Sailor Zombie | Nakajima | TV Tokyo | |
| 2014 | Tokusou | Tomoko Sakurai (college) | WOWOW | Episode 4 to Final Episode |

=== Radio dramas ===
| Year | Title | Role | Network | Notes |
|---|---|---|---|---|
| 2010 | Bakumatsu Sanshimai | Rinhime | NBS | |

=== Direct-to-video, internet drama ===
| Year | Title | Role | Notes |
|---|---|---|---|
| 2010 | Trap: Bokura wa Sono Wana ni Kakaranai | | Episodes 1 and 4 |
| 2011 | Mō Hitotsu no Kyōgū | Tamami | |
| 2014 | Chinsō-dan: 1-gōsha | | |

=== Variety ===
| Year | Title | Network | Notes |
|---|---|---|---|
| 2009 | Masahiro Nakai no Kinyōbi no Sma-tachi e | TBS | |

=== Advertisements ===
| Year | Title | Notes | Ref. |
|---|---|---|---|
| 2009 | Taisho Pharmaceutical Co. Vicks Vapodrops | | |
| 2010 | Asahi Food & Healthcare Mintia | Mintia Girl | |
| 2010 | S.T. Mushuda | | |
| 2010 | Spike Danganronpa: Trigger Happy Havoc | | |
| 2010 | Carview minkara | | |
| 2013 | MOS Food Services MOS Burger | | |
| 2014 | Miki Corporation Mikiprune | | |
| 2014 | Chiba Bank | | |

=== Advertising ===
| Year | Title | Notes |
|---|---|---|
| 2008 | Chuman Corporation | |
| 2010 | JTB Corporation | |
| 2011 | Kanco Company Elle Ecole | Image character |
| 2012 | Zenkoku Shōbō Kyōkai Heisei 24-nen "Haru no Kasai Yobō Undō-yō" poster | |

=== Music videos ===
| Year | Title | Notes |
|---|---|---|
| 2009 | Funky Monkey Babys "Ashita e" | |
| 2009 | Kana Nishino "Dear..." | |
| 2010 | Kana Nishino "Best Friend" | |
| 2010 | Ken Hirai "Aishiteru" | |
| 2014 | Granrodeo "Hengen Jizai no Magical Star" | |
| 2014 | Fujifabric "Blue" | |
