= Shuto Iten Keikaku =

- Japanese Edition's cover

Single by Team Syachihoko

from the album Himatsubushi
- B-side: "Sokosoko Premium"; "Maji Kansha"(Japanese Edition); "Summer Lover" (Nagoya Edition)
- Released: June 19, 2013 (Japan)
- Genre: J-pop, pop
- Label: Unborde

Team Syachihoko singles chronology
| "The Stardust Bowling" (2012) | "Shuto Iten Keikaku" (2013) | "Ai no Chikyūsai" (2013) |

Music video
- Shuto Iten Keikaku on YouTube
- "Soko Soko Premium" on YouTube

"Shuto Iten Keikaku" (首都移転計画; "Plan for the Relocation of the Capital") is the fourth single by the Japanese girl idol group Team Syachihoko, to be released in Japan on June 19, 2013, by Unborde Records (Warner Music Japan). The single is positioned as the group's "Japanese pre-major debut single".

== Track listing ==
=== Japanese Edition (Regular Edition) ===
| No. | Title | Length |
|---|---|---|
| 1. | "Shuto Iten Keikaku" (首都移転計画) |
| 2. | "Sokosoko Premium" (そこそこプレミアム Sokosoko Puremiamu) |
| 3. | "Maji Kansha" (マジ感謝) |
| 4. | "Shuto Iten Keikaku (instrumental)" (首都移転計画（off vocal）) |
| 5. | "Sokosoko Premium (instrumental)" (そこそこプレミアム（off vocal）) |
| 6. | "Maji Kansha (instrumental)" (マジ感謝（off vocal）) |

=== Nagoya Edition (Nagoya & Venue Edition) ===
| No. | Title | Length |
|---|---|---|
| 1. | "Shuto Iten Keikaku" (首都移転計画) |
| 2. | "Sokosoko Premium" (そこそこプレミアム) |
| 3. | "Summer Lover" (サマラバ Samaraba) |
| 4. | "Shuto Iten Keikaku (instrumental)" (首都移転計画（off vocal）) |
| 5. | "Sokosoko Premium (instrumental)" (そこそこプレミアム（off vocal）) |
| 6. | "Summer Lover (instrumental)" (サマラバ（off vocal）) |

== Charts ==
| Chart (2013) | Peak position |
|---|---|
| Oricon Weekly Singles Chart | 11 |
