= Stardust Promotion =

Japanese talent agency

Stardust Promotion Co., Ltd.
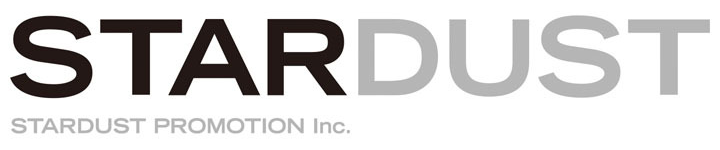
- Native name: 株式会社スターダストプロモーション
- Type: Kabushiki gaisha
- Industry: Service industry (entertainment)
- Genre: Tarento, singer, actor and model management, etc.
- Founded: 24 February 1979; 47 years ago
- Headquarters: Takeda Bldg., 3-3, Ebisu Nishi 2-chome, Shibuya-ku, Tokyo, Japan; ZIP 150-0021
- Area served: Japan
- Key people: Yoshirō Hosono (representative)
- Subsidiaries: Stardust Net; SDP (Stardust Pictures); Stardust Music Publishing; SDI (Stardust Interactive); Smooch; SDM (Stardust Marketing); SDR (Stardust Music, Inc.)
- Website: www.stardust.co.jp

Stardust Promotion Co., Ltd. (株式会社スターダストプロモーション) is a Japanese talent agency, headquartered in Shibuya, Tokyo. It was founded in 1979 and invests in entertainment forms including music, cinema, and modelling.

The agency has a dominant share in the management of actresses. For example, it had managed Yūko Takeuchi (best known for the movie Be with You) and Kō Shibasaki (Socrates in Love). The agency is known for its all-female musical groups such as Momoiro Clover Z, Shiritsu Ebisu Chugaku, and all-male musical groups such as Bullet Train, Dish and also has its own independent record label SDR (Stardust Records).

In 2009, Stardust Promotion opened a branch in South Korea. In addition to the head office in Tokyo, Stardust Promotion has offices in Nagoya, in Osaka, and since lately in Fukuoka. The agency has recently started to put an emphasis on local talents and created several local idol groups, namely Team Syachihoko (in Nagoya) and Tacoyaki Rainbow (in Osaka).

== Current notable roster ==
=== Actors ===
- Hayato Ichihara
- Asaya Kimijima
- Naruki Matsukawa
- Kenji Mizuhashi
- Win Morisaki
- Taiga Nakano
- Kippei Shiina
- Seiyō Uchino
- Atsuro Watabe
- Takayuki Yamada
- Kento Yamazaki
- Tsuyoshi Furukawa
- Taishi Nakagawa
- Takumi Kitamura
- Kanata Hongō
- Hiroki Ino
- Ryusei Yokohama
- Kousei Yuki
- Sho Kiyohara
- Munetaka Aoki
- Masashi Goda
- Gaku Hamada
- Kai-Riki (Keita Riki)
- Kento Hayashi
- Takuji Kawakubo
- Masataka Kubota
- Riki Miura
- Masaki Okada
- Kazuma Sano
- Taishi Nakagawa
- Terunosuke Takezai
- Koutaro Tanaka
- Satoshi Tomiura
- Yūya Yagira
- Daiken Okudaira
- Yuto Fuchino
- Jyutaro Yamanaka

=== Actresses ===
- Rika Izumi
- Wakana Aoi
- Shiori Akita
- Tsubasa Honda
- Hairi Katagiri
- Yasuko Matsuyuki
- Rie Mimura
- Aoi Morikawa
- Yumi Morio
- Mei Nagano
- Yurika Nakamura
- Maki Sakai
- Takako Tokiwa
- Moe Yamaguchi
- Momoka Tanabe
- Hikaru Ohsawa
- Rin Takanashi
- Chihiro Yamamoto
- Yuko Araki
- Fumina Hara
- Akari Hayami (former Momoiro Clover)
- Mika Hijii
- Yuka Hoshaku
- Kaho
- Keiko Kitagawa
- Nana Komatsu
- Rina Komiyama
- Yuki Sakurai
- Minori Hagiwara
- Takayo Mimura
- Yuika Motokariya
- Runa Natsui
- Erika Okuda
- Aya Ōmasa
- Phongchi (former Idoling!!!)
- Megumi Sato
- Megumi Seki
- Kō Shibasaki
- Kyoka Shibata
- Shiho
- Yuko Takayama
- Miori Takimoto (former SweetS)
- Yuuka Yano
- Asuka Kishi

=== Voice Actors ===
- Emiri Kato

=== Models ===
- Yūki Mihara
- Anri Okamoto
- Rie
- Rinka
- Shelly
- Arisa Sato
- Shiori Sato
- Emi Suzuki
- Karen Takizawa
- Kai-Riki

=== Musical artists ===
- Bullet Train
- Dish
- Kenichi Maeyamada
- Vaundy
- Hinata Kashiwagi (singer, former Shiritsu Ebisu Chugaku)
- Cent Chihiro Chittiii (former BiSH)

=== STAR PLANET talents ===
- Momoiro Clover Z (Kanako Momota, Shiori Tamai, Ayaka Sasaki, Reni Takagi)
- Shiritsu Ebisu Chugaku (Rika Mayama, Ayaka Yasumoto, Riko Nakayama, Cocona Sakuragi, Yuno Kokubo, Nonoka Kazami, Ema Sakurai, Yuna Nakamura)
- TEAM SHACHI (Honoka Akimoto, Nao Sakura, Yuzuki Ōguro, Haruna Sakamoto)
- Batten Shōjo Tai(BATTEN GIRLS) (Ai Kiyama, Riko Ueda, Kiina Haruno, Sakura Seta, Rirua Aoi, Miyu Yanagi)
- Chō Tokimeki Sendenbu (Kanami Tsujino, Hitoka Sakai, Haruka Koizumi, Aki Suda, Hiyori Yoshikawa)
- AMEFURASSHI (Aira, Yuduki Ichikawa, Hana Kojima, Moeka Suzuki)
- Iginari Tohoku San(MADE IN TOHOKU) (Karen Tachibana, Hikaru Ritsuki, Rine Kitami, Waka Yasumori, Shinju Kichise, Hinano Sakura, Miu Fujitani, Kaaya Date, Yuna Hazuki)
- ukka (Riju Murahoshi, Sora Akane, Moa Serizawa, Rina Yūki, Ruri Aoi, Yū Miyazawa, Koharu Wakana)
- CROWN POP (Rina, Ibuki Mita, Saho Tanaka, Airi Fujita, Mia Yuduki)
- Namie Joshihatsu Kumiai(Joshihatsu Association Namie; JA Namie) (Ayaka Sasaki, Luna Naitō, Kana Harima, Saho Tanaka, Mia Yuduki, Moana Chihama, Nanoha Aoyama)
- STAPLA Kenkyusei (a female trainee group under STARDUST PLANET) (Mizuki Yasui, Moana Chihama, Miu Kurosaka, Ruri Shiraishi, Riri Takatsuki, Rinna Shimada, Yū Watanabe, Miumi Nishimura, Aya shirahama, Nanoha Aoyama, Mai Harada, Juri Suzue)

=== Others ===
- Takahiro Miki (film director)
- Maki Miyamae (tarento, former CoCo)
- Orange Range (rock band)
- K (singer)
- Kei (Boys Planet contestant)
- June (singer)
- Flower Flower (rock band)
- Yui (singer)
- Brother Tom

== Former Stardust Promotion artists ==
Artists, managed by Stardust Promotion in the past.

=== Female ===
- Tomoko Akiya (voice actress)
- Momoka Ariyasu (singer, former Momoiro Clover Z)
- Anza (singer)
- Miori Ichikawa (tarento, former AKB48 and NMB48)
- Aiko Itō (actress)
- Keiko Utoku (singer)
- Anna Umemiya (model)
- Ayumi Oka (actress)
- Yukina Kashiwa (actress, former Momoiro Clover and Nogizaka46)
- Mayu Gamō (actress)
- Aya Kiguchi (gravure idol)
- Ayumi Kinoshita (actress)
- Haruna Kojima (former AKB48)
- Izumi Sakai (singer, deceased)
- Erika Sawajiri (actress)
- Mayumi Shintani (voice actress)
- Hana Sugisaki (actress)
- Kiki Sugino (actress)
- Anri Sugihara (tarento)
- Aya Sugimoto (tarento)
- Risa Junna (actress)
- Saki Takaoka (actress)
- Miyu Takeuchi (former AKB48)
- Makoto Takeda (tarento)
- Anna Nagata (actress)
- Karin Aiba (actress)
- Miki Nakatani (actress)
- Kaori Natori (singer)
- Kyoko Hinami (actress)
- Aika Hirota (singer, former Shiritsu Ebisu Chugaku)
- Lena Fujii (model)
- Erina Masuda (announcer)
- Rina Matsuno (former Shiritsu Ebisu Chugaku, died on 8 February 2017)
- Kanako Tahara (actress)
- Hiroko Mita (actress)
- Yūko Takeuchi (actress, died on 27 September 2020)
- Narumi Uno (actress, voice actress, singer)
- Rio Yamashita (actress)
- Sachika Misawa (voice actress)

=== Male ===
- Masanobu Ando (actor)
- Kei Inoo (idol, currently in Hey! Say! JUMP)
- Kento Ono (actor)
- Ryosei Konishi (actor)
- Shōya Ishige (voice actor)
- Shun Shioya (actor)
- Kiyohiko Shibukawa (actor)
- Sousuke Takaoka (former actor)
- Shinpei Takagi (former actor)
- Manpei Takagi (actor)
- Takayuki Tsubaki (actor)
- Kenji Haga (former tarento)
- Mokomichi Hayami (actor)
- Yoshihiko Hosoda (actor)
- Osamu Sato (boxer)
- Yukihiro Takiguchi (deceased)
- Fukuda Yusuke (Former Bullet Train)
- Mizuki Itagaki (actor, died February 2025)

=== Groups ===
- ZARD (pop rock band)
- Manish (pop band)
- Mi-Ke (idol group)
- Little by Little (pop rock band)
- Musashi's
- CustomiZ
- LAGOON
- Le Lien
- PrizmaX
- 3B junior
- Rock A Japonica
- Hachimitsu Rocket
- Awww!
- Tacoyaki Rainbow
- B.O.L.T

== See also ==
- EBiDAN
- List of modeling agencies
