= Ebidan =

J-pop collective

Ebidan EBiDAN
- Origin: Japan
- Genres: J-pop, pop
- Years active: 2011–present
- Website: ebidan.jp

Ebidan (an abbreviation of Ebisu Gakuen Danshi-bu (恵比寿学園男子部; "Ebisu Gakuen Boys Club"); stylized as EBiDAN) is a music collective consisting of male artists associated with the talent agency Stardust Promotion.

== Lineup ==
=== Music groups ===
- Bullet Train (超特急, Chōtokkyū)
- M!LK
- SUPER★DRAGON
- Sakura Shimeji (さくらしめじ)
- ONE N' ONLY
- Genin wa Jibun ni Aru. (原因は自分にある。)
- BUDDiiS
- ICEx
- Lienel
- iiONDO

==== Ebidan Next ====
- Battle Boys Sakura
- CZ'25

=== Former groups ===
- CustomiZ (カスタマイZ)
- Magic Boyz
- PrizmaX
- DISH//
- Edamame Beans {エダマメビーンズ}
- EBiSSH (This unit merged with Satori Boys Club after touring together in 2018, forming the unit One N' Only)
- Satori Shounen Dan (さとり少年団; "Satori Boys Club")
- Starmen Kids
- Amezari -Red Stars-
- Zebra Star
- HONG¥O.JP

== Discography ==
=== Singles ===
List of singles, with selected chart positions and sales
No.	Title	Year	Peak	Sales
No.	Title	Year	JPN	Sales
1	"Yes! Tokyo" (Yes! 東京)	2026	1	JPN: 1,053,495

== NHK Kōhaku Uta Gassen appearances ==
Number	Year	Edition	Song	Appearance order	Opponent	Remarks
1	2026	77th	TBA	TBA	TBA	Kōhaku debut.
