= Rie (model) =

Japanese fashion model (born 1980)

Rie (理衣, Rie, born 14 August 1980 in Tokyo) is a Japanese fashion model. Her management agency is Stardust Promotion, which also manages her younger sister, singer Alice. Her full name is Rie Takayama (高山理衣, Takayama Rie). She is of maternal Spanish descent.

Rie debuted in TV on NTV's variety show Ucchan Nanchan no Urinari! in mid-1990s, and sang in the group McKee on the show, releasing Can't Stop My Heart which charted as high as #28. She also has appeared in commercial for companies such as Toyota or Sapporo Beverage and in the 2006 movie Memories of Matsuko (though uncredited). Rie appears regularly in fashion magazines as MISS and BAILA, as well as catalogues for several fashion companies in Japan.

In 2007 she appeared on Remioromen's videoclip for Akanezora. In 2009 she married a businessman from Hong Kong. In late 2011, she announced she was pregnant.
