= Yuka Hoshaku =

Japanese actress (born 1975)

Yuka Hoshaku (宝積 有香; born 6 July 1975 in Hokkaido) is a Japanese actress. She is known for roles in TV series such as Iihito and also guest-starring several episodes of Keitai deka series. Her agency is Stardust Promotion.

== Filmography ==
- Kētai Deka the movie (2007)
- Trick 3 (TV)
