= Wakana Yamashita =

Japanese actress, television talent (born 1984)

- 山下 若菜
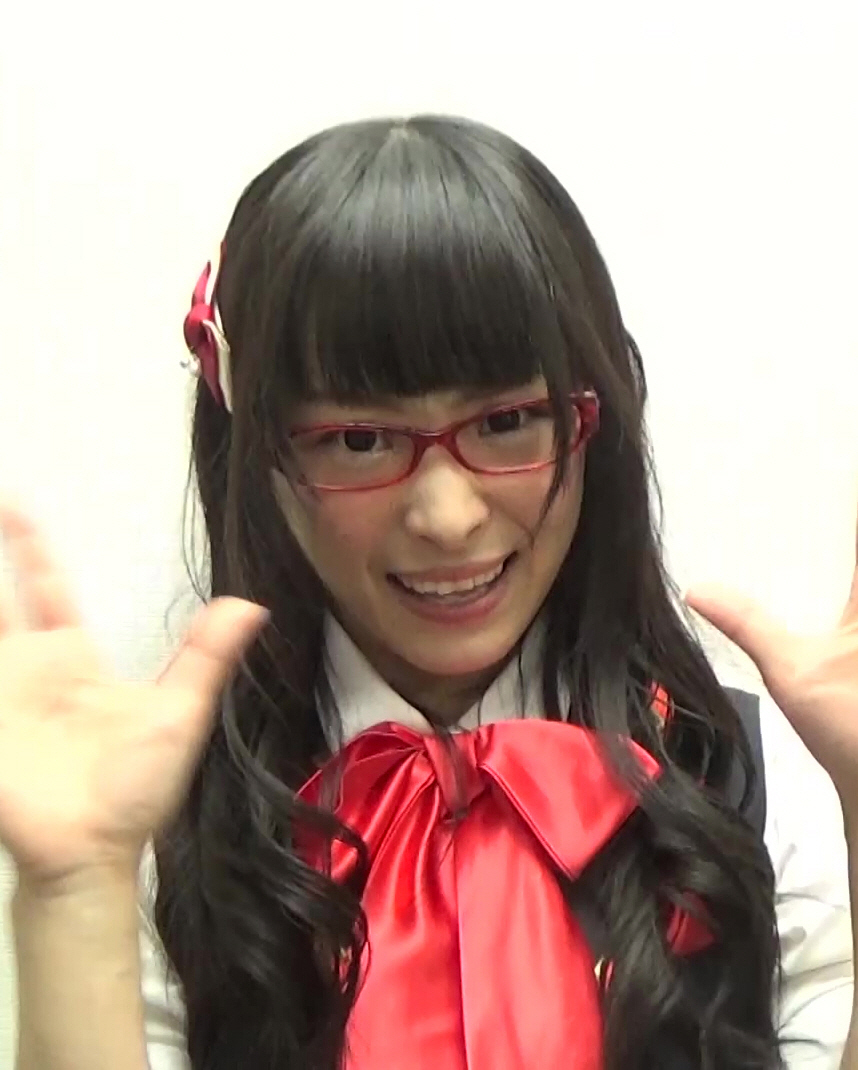
- Born: September 21, 1984 (age 40); Fukuoka, Fukuoka Prefecture, Japan
- Other names: Wacchan
- Occupations: Tarento; idol
- Agent: Sole Promotion
- Height: 1.54 m (5 ft 1 in)

Wakana Yamashita (山下 若菜, Yamashita Wakana; born 21 September 1984, in Fukuoka, Fukuoka Prefecture, Japan) is a Japanese tarento. She is nicknamed Wacchan (わっちゃん). She is the leader of the idol group Sanspo Idol Reporter. She is represented with Sole Promotion.

== Biography ==
Yamashita is the second daughter of three sisters. While in high school, she worked in the foundation of a local theatre company in Fukuoka. After graduating from high school Yamashita was scheduled to join to the company. It led her to have a career in Tokyo. Although becoming an actress after being passed from the audition, Yamashita wrote scripts in the theatre company because she lacked situations to act, and gained and income and sold to other companies. While working as an idol, she also worked as an MC. Yamashita's career expanded in television on 2008. From 2012 she joined activities in the idol group Sanspo Idol Reporter.

== Filmography ==
=== TV series ===
Year	Title	Network
	SMAP×SMAP	KTV, Fuji TV
2008	Lincoln	TBS
2008	"P" Sma	TV Asahi
	On'na Matatsuto-kun	TV Saitama, Chiba TV
2009	Card Gakuen	TBS
2009	Hiruobi!	TBS
2009	Utsukushiki Aoki de Now	TV Asahi
2009	Shibuya Deep A	NHK BS-2
2009	Academy Night	TBS
2010	Shin Chishiki Kaikyū Kumagus	TBS
2010	Zenryoku-saka	TV Asahi
2011	Goddotan	TV Tokyo
2011	The Non-fiction	Fuji TV
2011	Hanamaru Market	TBS
2011	Non-fiction W	WOWOW
2011	Docking 48	KTV
2011	Zenigata Kintarō	TV Asahi
2012	Tokumei Kakarichō: Hitoshi Tadani	TV Asahi
2012	Onegai! Ranking	TV Asahi
2012	Koi Nante Zeitaku ga Watashi ni Ochite Kuru Nodarou ka?	Fuji TV Two
2012	Tsuntube	Tokyo MX
2012	mu-Jack	KTV
2013	O Sekkyō Idol: Shikaru Genji	ABC
2013	Kimura Gyotaku	Sky PerfecTV!, Pachi-tele
2014	Mayonaka no o Baka Sawagi	CTC, Tokyo MX

=== Radio ===
Year	Title	Network
2009	Aa!? So So Radio B-Max	Shimokita FM
2010	Junji Takada Michiko Kawai no Tokyo Paradise	NCB
2012	The Kanmuri Radio	Radio Nippon
2013	Erena Ono, Fon de Rinku	NCB

=== Internet ===
Year	Title	Network
	Kachinuki! Idol Tengoku!! Nuki Ten	GyaO
	Wakana no Counseling Room	nakano@ddress
	Koisuru Paradise	nakano@ddress
2009	Sumomo	Net TV
2012	Sir Amusement Hōsōkyoku: Idol Reporter no Kiseki	Shimokita FM, Niconico Live
2012	Sir Amusement Hōsōkyoku: Shinsō Kaiten! Sir no Nama Cafe	Niconico Live
2014	Sir Pachinko Hōsōkyoku: Shinsō Kaiten! Sir no Nama Pachi	Niconico Live
2015	Mayonaka no Ura Sawagi!	Niconico Live

=== Films ===
Year	Title	Role
2008	Noroi no List	Yayoi Iizuka
2009	Baton	
2010	Kami no Chi	Yuki Kashiwabara
2010	B-On: Furyō Zenmetsu-hen	Tomo Uehara
2011	Dai San Byōtō no Oni	Machiko
2012	Seirei Yakyoku: Mottomo Furui Kubitsuri no Ki	Yoriko

=== DVD ===
Year	Title
2009	Card Gakuen DVD
2010	Iradol

=== Stage ===
Year	Title	Role
2009	Hae to Yoba Reta Hakase no Hanashi	
2011	Alice in Project: Alice in Chrono Paradox	Kano Wadazuka

=== Pachinko machines ===
Year	Title
2013	CR King no Keiba
