= Tsuri Bit =

Japanese girl idol group

- Origin: Japan
- Genre: J-pop
- Years active: 2013-2019
- Label: Kisspoint Records
- Website: tsuribit.com

Tsuri Bit (つりビット, Tsuribitto) was a Japanese 5-member girl idol group. It released its debut single in 2013 and disbanded in 2019.

The group's name is a portmanteau of "angling" (釣り, tsuri) and the English word "bit".

== Members ==
- Mizuki Hasegawa (長谷川瑞)
- Natsuki Takeuchi (竹内夏紀)
- Aya Kikima (聞間彩)
- Sakura Andō (安藤咲桜)
- Ayu Konishi (小西杏優)

== Discography ==
=== Singles ===
No.	Title	Release date	Charts
No.	Title	Release date	JPN
1	"Manatsu no Tentai Kansoku" (真夏の天体観測)	July 24, 2013	86
2	"Vanilla no Sora" (バニラな空)	November 27, 2013	62
3	"Tabidachi Kirari" (旅立ちキラリ。)	March 26, 2014	30
4	"Odoro yo, Fish" (踊ろよ、フィッシュ)	July 30, 2014	25
5	"Makenai Guts (Itsuka Sekai o Tsuriagemasu)" (負けないガッツ ～いつか世界を釣り上げます～)	April 1, 2015	22
6	"Tsurisen wa Iraneze" (釣り銭はいらねぇぜ))	August 5, 2015	21
7	"Uroko Gumo to Orion za" (ウロコ雲とオリオン座)	December 16, 2015	15
8	"Chu Shitai" (Chuしたい)	June 15, 2016	5
9	"1010 Toto" (1010～とと～)	November 1, 2017	9
10	"Fushigi na Tabi wa Tsuzuku no sa" (不思議な旅はつづくのさ)	March 7, 2018	

=== Albums ===
No.	Album details	Charts
No.	Album details	JPN
1	Fishing Life (フィッシングライフ): Released: December 10, 2014	53
2	Blue Ocean Fishing Cruise: Released: April 5, 2017	21

=== Digital singles ===
1. "Start Fish!" (スタートダッシュ!) (May 22, 2013)
2. "Fish Island" (October 10, 2013)
3. "Go! Go!! Fishing" (October 10, 2014)
