= PrizmaX =

Japanese boyband

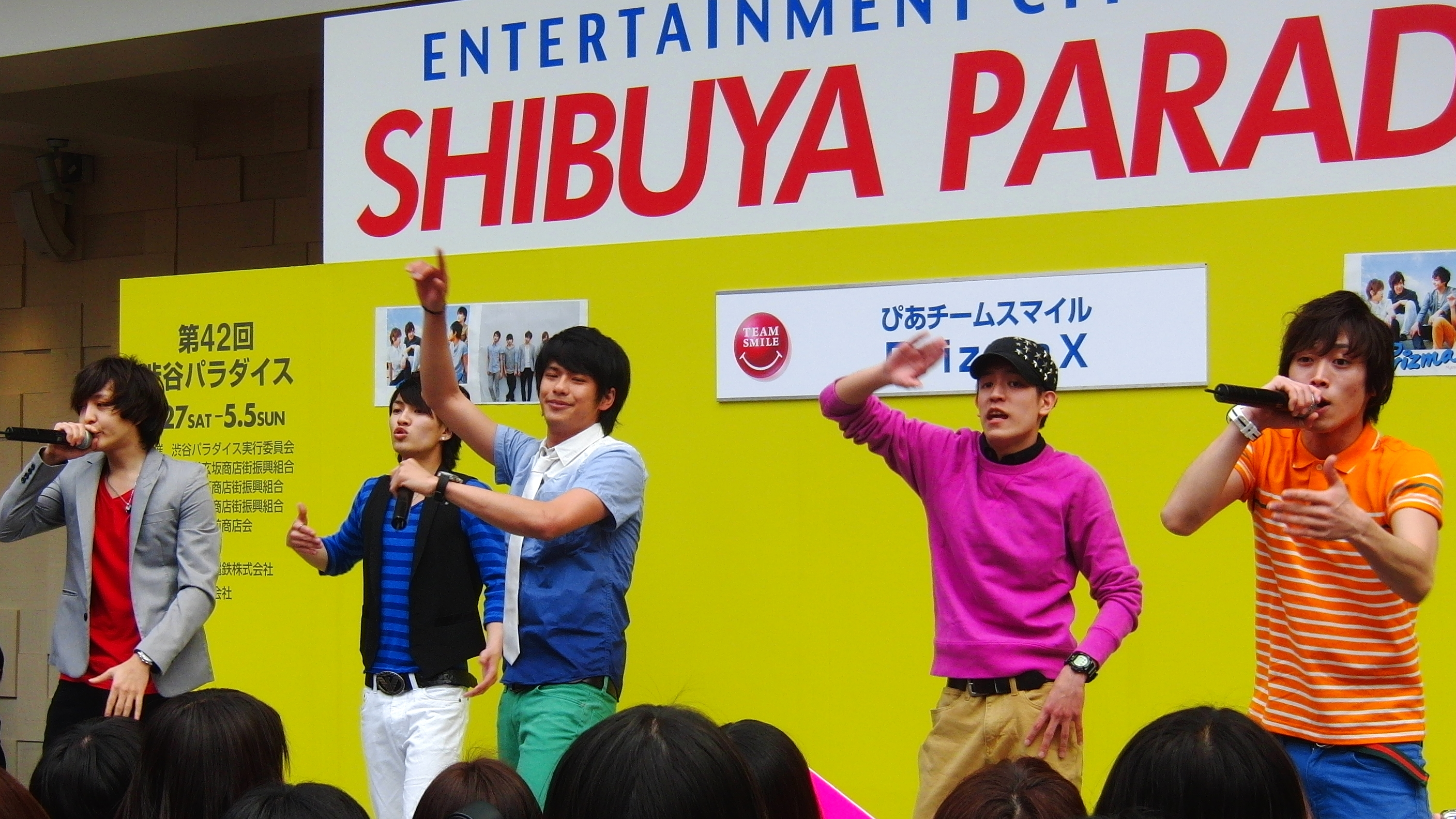

Background information
- Also known as: Wonder☆Wown
- Origin: Japan
- Genres: J-pop, pop
- Years active: 2002–2020
- Label: SDR (indie label)
- Spinoff of: Ebidan
- Members: Win Morisaki; Daiki Shimizu; Yuki Fukumoto; Tsubasa Shimada
- Past members: Tim Kurokawa; Jin Sugiyama; Olivet Taylor; Hickling Adam; Satoshi Tomiura; Renki Nemoto; Masataka Yoshikawa; Yuki Byrnes; Kenta Asada
- Website: prizmax.tokyo

PrizmaX (プリズマックス, Purizumakksu) was a 7-member Japanese boyband managed by Stardust Promotion. They were part of EBiDAN, a collective group of boys from the company trained to partake in various types of entertainment groups. PrizmaX was a member of HiGH EBiDAN along with brother groups Bullet Train and DISH//. The group disbanded in March 2020.

The group was originally formed in 2002 as Wonder☆Wown as a 4-member dance group. After many line-up changes, the group made their singing debut over a decade later in 2013 with Mysterious Eyes / Go!.

== History ==
=== 2002-05: Formation as Wonder Wown ===
The original 4-member group consisted of various elementary school boys formed in 2002 by Sugar&Spice. The group's purpose was to perform acting gigs and serve as backup dancers in Hello! Project tours. Tim Kurosaki (known as Tim Leavitt at the time) is the only current member in the original group. The other members were Jin Sugiyama, Olivet Taylor, and Hickling Adam. As a tradition of Stardust Promotion acts, PrizmaX regularly performs guerrilla gigs, and occasional outdoor events.

In 2003, the group was renamed to PrizmaX.

In 2005, several members left and joined. Yuki Fukumoto, Satoshi Tomiura, Renki Nemoto, and Masataka Yoshikawa are joining members. Members Hickling Adam and Masataka Yoshikawa left, the latter despite joining the group the same year.

In late 2005, PrizmaX Jr. was formed as a training group for PrizmaX. Daiki Shimizu and Tsubasa Shimada, current members of the group, as well as Yuki Byrnes and Kenta Asada joined the group. joined as members of PrizmaX Jr. In September of that year, PrizmaX was featured in Matsuirurika & Alice's Love Rurika music video.

=== 2006-09: Clap!, First recording projects ===
Clap! performance series for a location for the period of time that is 2006 where members perform covers songs originally done by major artists. Usually only a number of members perform because the members live in different neighborhoods. Tim Kurokawa and two former PrizmaX members were featured in Matsuriruka & Alice's song HUG~Dakishimete Kudasai.

In 2007, it was announced that PrizmaX Jr. would dissolve and the members of both groups would be combined to form a large 10-member group.

In 2008, current member Win Morisaki joined PrizmaX, transferred from another unit at the time, to replace additional leavings. Members Satoshi Tomiura left the group to become an actor. Renki Nemoto also left and Kenta Asada left the group in May of that year. Jin Sugiyama took a hiatus from the group to prepare for his exams.

PrizmaX participated in Crystal's single Crystal Children, released in April, in the B-side Heart of Crystal as a feature. In November, a ballad version of the song was released. In December 24, Tim Kurokawa released his first cover album TIM 1st. Cover Collection.

Tim Kurokawa was also featured in autumn leave's song Wanna Be the One from her 2nd Album Shake It!. He performed 4 songs for the compilation album ViVi presents HOLIDAY STYLE selected by LENA FUJII. In 2009, Tim was also featured in miu-clips's Addicted from the album Rhythm of My Heart. In September, Olivet Taylor announced his hiatus from the group.

=== 2010-2013: Integration into EBiDAN, independent label debut with Mysterious Eyes / Go! and Ready ===
In August 2010, it was announced PrizmaX would be put into a supergroup of boys called EBiDAN. They were to be regularly performing with them in live concert stages starting in November 2010.

In 2011, both Yuki Fukumoto and Tsubasa Shimada announced indefinite withdrawals from the group. The two would later rejoin the group when they did their CD debut.

In 2012, Yuki Byrnes left the group to study dancing in the United States, making the lineup at the time only 3 members.

In February 2013, it was announced at Yokohama Cosmo World during a free concert that Yuki Fukumoto and Tsubasa Shimada would be returning into the group for their CD debut. In March 2013, PrizmaX's 1st single Mysterious Eyes / Go! was released. In October 2013, PrizmaX's 2nd single Ready was released.

=== 2014: Take Me, Reborn, and Special Single Fantasista ===
In March 2014, PrizmaX's 3rd Single Take Me was released. In September 2014, PrizmaX's 4th Single REBORN was released. Charting at number 7 on the Oricon Weekly Singles Chart, it was PrizmaX's best performing single at the time. In December 2014, PrizmaX released a Special Single by the name Fantasista.

=== 2015-16: Our Zone, Lonely Summer Days, and Up Upbeat ===
In May 2015, PrizmaX's 5th Single Our Zone was released. In the same month, PrizmaX did an overseas event in the Novotel Yangon Max, located at Myanmar, Win Morisaki's birthplace. This was PrizmaX's first overseas live performance.

In September 2015, PrizmaX's 6th Single Lonely Summer Days was released. In April 2016, PrizmaX's 7th Single Up Upbeat was released. Charting at 4 on the Oricon Weekly Singles Chart, it became PrizmaX's best performing single.

=== 2016-18: Mushrooms subgroup, solo activities, and 1st Album Gradually ===
In June 2016, it was announced member Win Morisaki will be featured in the movie adaptation of Ready Player One, directed by Steven Spielberg, as the character Daito. He took a temporary leave for the second half of 2016 to focus on the project. The movie is set to launch early 2018. At the same time, the remaining members formed the subgroup Mushrooms (マッシュルームズ, Masshurūmuzu). The members include Tim Kurokawa, Daiki Shimizu, Yuki Fukumoto, and Tsubasa Shimada. They participated in a tribute album for The Beatles titled Hello Goodbye with the song "Magical Mystery Tour".

In March 2017, PrizmaX released their 1st studio-length album, Gradually. One of the songs in the album is a remake of their first single track, "Mysterious Eyes".

On June 25, 2018, Tim Kurokawa announced that he was leaving the group in order to take a break from the music industry.

=== 2019-20: 2nd Album FRNKSTN and disbandment ===
On April 17, 2019, PrizmaX released their 2nd full album titled FRNKSTN.

On November 8, 2019, Yuki Fukumoto announced that the "PRIZMAX Live Level 9 ～CIRCUS WINTER EDITION～" concert on December 29, 2019, would be his last activity with PrizmaX and that he would retire from the entertainment industry afterwards.

On January 10, 2020, it was announced that the "PRIZMAX Live Level 0 〜FINAL〜" concert on March 27, 2020, would be their final activity and that the group would disband afterwards. The big catalyst for this decision were the withdrawals of Tim Kurokawa, an original member since the group's formation, and Yuki Fukumoto. After receiving the intention of Yuki Fukumoto to withdraw at the end of last year, the members and staff repeatedly discussed about the group's future and concluded to end their activities.

== Members ==
=== Current members ===
Name	Birth date and age	Birthplace	Position
Win Morisaki (森崎ウィン)	August 20, 1990 (age 35)	Myanmar	Vocalist
Daiki Shimizu (清水大樹)	July 31, 1991 (age 35)	Osaka Prefecture	Performer, rapper
Yuki Fukumoto (福本有希)	May 12, 1990 (age 36)	Hokkaido	Performer
Tsubasa Shimada (島田翼)	May 18, 1996 (age 30)	Kanagawa Prefecture	Performer
Kevin (ケビン)	July 12, 1997 (age 29)	Kanagawa Prefecture	Backup vocalist
Hidetoshi Mori (森英寿)	November 20, 1999 (age 26)	Tokyo	Backup vocalist
Fuminori Ogawa (小川史記)	November 21, 1994 (age 31)	Saitama Prefecture	Performer, rapper

== Discography ==
=== Studio albums ===
Title	Album details	Peak chart positions	Sales
Title	Album details	JPN	Sales
Gradually	Released: March 29, 2017; Label: SDR, Victor Entertainment (Dist.); Formats: CD, digital download; Track listing: 1. Gradually; 2. Pleasure; 3. Sing it!; 4. Angel; 5. Reborn; 6. My Girl; 7. Up Upbeat; 8. Never; 9. Someday; 10. Just Revolution; 11. Mysterious Eyes (New Version); 12. It's Love; 13. Fantasista; 14. Three Things	13	JPN: 7,201
FRNKSTN	Released: April 17, 2019; Label: SDR, Victor Entertainment (Dist.); Formats: CD, digital download; Track listing (disc 1): 1. Dance; 2. Light the Night; 3. DADADADADADA; 4. Bad Love; 5. Who; 6. Sweet Goodbye; 7. Dance (International version); Track listing (disc 2): 1. Candy; 2. Rewind; 3. South Cross; 4. I Hate You	15	JPN: 5,662

=== Singles ===
Title	Year	Peak positions	Album
Title	Year	JPN	Album
"Mysterious Eyes"	2013	157	Gradually
"Go!"	2013	157	Non-album singles
"Ready"	2013	60	Non-album singles
"Take Me"	2014	14	Non-album singles
"Reborn"	2014	7	Gradually
"Fantasista"	2014	45	Gradually
"Our Zone"	2015	14	Non-album singles
"Lonely Summer Days"	2015	7	Non-album singles
"Up Upbeat"	2016	4	Gradually
"Orange Moon"	2017	17	Non-album singles
"Yours"	2018	11	Non-album singles
"Candy"	2018	—	FRNKSTN
"Rewind"	2018	—	FRNKSTN
"South Cross"	2018	—	FRNKSTN
"I Hate You"	2018	—	FRNKSTN
"—" denotes releases that did not chart or were not released in that region.

=== Promotional singles ===
Title	Year	Peak positions	Album
Title	Year	JPN	Album
"Let's Prove It"	2015	—	Non-album single
"Someday"	2017	—	Gradually
"My Girl"	2017	—	Gradually
"Memory"	2018	—	Non-album single
"—" denotes releases that did not chart or were not released in that region.
