= Sakura Andō (singer) =

Japanese singer and television personality

- 安藤 咲桜
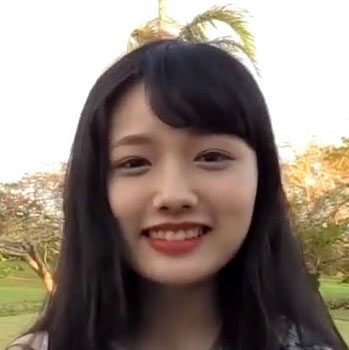
- Ando in 2020
- Born: March 23, 2001 (age 24)
- Years active: (2013–2019 as singer) (2021–present as television personality)
- Agent(s): Sugar&Spice
- Height: 156 cm (5 ft 1 in)

Sakura Andō (安藤 咲桜, Andō Sakura; born 23 March 2001) is a Japanese singer and television personality. She is a member of Tsuri Bit. She is nicknamed Sakuchin (さくちん). Her colour is pink in the group. She also represents the marlin in Tsuri Bit. After being disbanded on 24 March 2019, she become an actress

== Biography ==
On 22 May 2013, Andō debuted as a member of Tsuri Bit. They debuted with the song "Start Dash".

On 23 April 2014, a fishing centre test carried out in Tsuri Bit members Tsuri Center Kettei-hai 2014 –Hikki Shiken-hen– Hōkago wa Mini Live, shined in the second generation fishing centre. Andō served as centre at the delivery single "Go! Go! Fishing" released on 10 October (Fishing Day) the same year.

Published on 12 May 2016, she posted her swimsuit gravure within Weekly Young Jump "Sakidol Ace Survival" project.

Andō's swimsuit gravure was also posted on Weekly Playboy released on 4 July 2016.

She was inaugurated as the "Official Navigator" of @Jam Expo 2017 held at Kanagawa Yokohama Arena on 26 and 27 August. Andō will organize the same event unit Sakurano no Yume with Yumeri Abe of Super Girls and Mika Ichinose of Kamiyado from 27 May.

== Filmography ==
=== Radio ===
Date	Title	Network	Notes
18 Apr 2013	Yasuda Dai Circus Kuro-chan no Idol Station	Meguro FM	Assistant MC
7 Jun 2016	Mayonaka no Harley & Race	Radio Nippon	

=== Television series ===
Date	Title	Network	Role
7 Apr 2021	Girl Gun Lady	MBS TV	Lady Commander Daisy

== Exhibitions ==
Run	Title	Location	Ref.
16–30 May 2017	Tokyo Idol Net presents Idol Camera-bu: Shashin-ten	Harajuku Fujifilm Wonder Photo Shop	
