= Tokyo Girl (2008 TV series) =

- Country of origin: Japan
- Original language: Japanese

Original release
- Network: BS-TBS
- Release: April 5, 2008 – March 28, 2009

Tokyo Girl (東京少女) is a Japanese television drama series that aired on BS-TBS from April 5, 2008 to March 28, 2009.

== Cast ==
- Rio Yamashita
- Erena Mizusawa
- Nanami Sakuraba
- Aya Ōmasa
- Anri Okamoto
- Misaki Uryū
- Mayū Kusakari
- Azusa Okamoto
- Marika Fukanaga
- Chiho Hinata
- Erina Mano
- Yu Sorua
- Karin Aiba
