= Rock A Japonica =

Japanese girl idol group

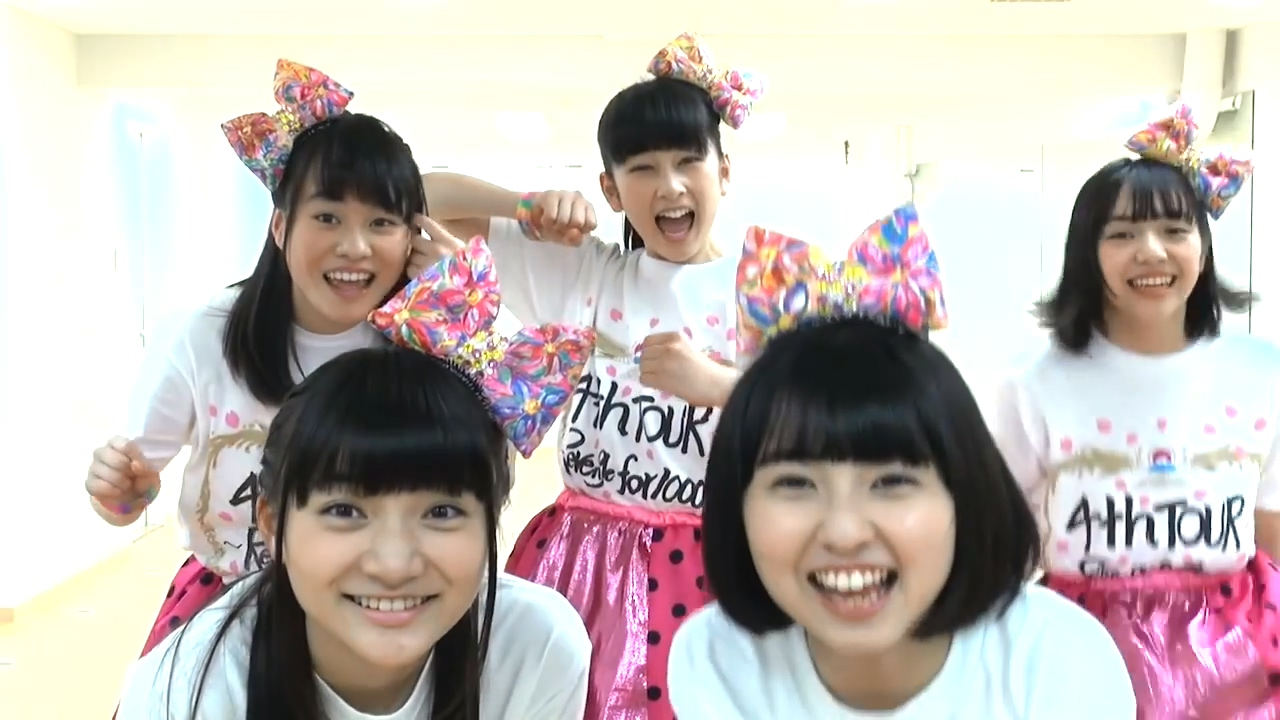

Background information
- Origin: Japan
- Genres: J-pop; pop
- Years active: 2014–2019
- Label: Evil Line / King
- Members: Luna Naitō; Chiho Takai; Misato Hirase
- Past members: Ruka Shiina; Ami Uchiyama
- Website: www.rockajaponica.com

Rock A Japonica (ロッカジャポニカ, Rokka Japonika; stylized in English as ROCK A JAPONICA) is a Japanese girl idol group managed by Stardust Promotion. It was formed in 2015 with five members from 3B Junior (out of 26 in total): Ami Uchiyama, Luna Naitō, Ruka Shiina, Chiho Takai, and Misato Hirase.

The name of the group implies their intention to "rock Japan" (to shake it, impress, get it going). The group was dissolved on April 29, 2019, but will have one more performance during the "EVIL A LIVE 2019" festival.

The 3 remaining members came back with the new unit B.O.L.T on April 15, 2019

== Members ==
Name	Birthdate	Notes
Luna Naitō (内藤るな)	December 23, 2000 (age 25)	
Chiho Takai (高井千帆)	November 20, 2001 (age 24)	
Misato Hirase (平瀬美里)	August 6, 2002 (age 23)	

=== Former Members ===
Name	Birthdate	Notes
Ruka Shiina (椎名るか)	July 28, 2001 (age 24)	Graduated on April 8, 2019 due to poor health condition
Ami Uchiyama (内山あみ)	January 17, 2000 (age 26)	Graduated on April 29, 2019 Former Leader

Notes:
1. Ami Uchiyama is a former member of Kagajo 4S (KAGAJO☆4S), the other four are former members of Minicheer Bears (みにちあ☆ベアーズ).
2. Luna's name formerly appeared as Runa on the website.

== Discography ==
=== Singles ===
Nº	Title	Release date	Charts
Nº	Title	Release date	JPN Oricon
1	"World Piece" (ワールドピース)	January 27, 2016	15
2	"Kyōka Shock!" (教歌SHOCK!)	July 6, 2016	5
3	"Dakedo Yumemiru" (だけどユメ見る)	November 23, 2016	8
-	"Tambourine Ring Ring" (タンバリン、凛々)	April 6, 2017	Only sold in limited events
4	"Sai the Kou!" (最the高)	August 1, 2018	15
5	"MUGEN" (MUGEN)	December 12, 2018	9
-	"Saint Mental gift" (Saint Mental gift)	December 25, 2018	Only sold in limited events

=== Albums ===
Title	Release date	Charts
Title	Release date	JPN Oricon
"Magical View" (Magical View)	November 15, 2017	12

== Videography ==
=== Music videos ===
Title	Year	Director(s)	Ref.
"Dakedo Yumemiru" (だけどユメ見る)	2016	Hideo Kawatani	
"Watashi No Chizu" (わたしの地図)	2017	tatsuaki	
"Kyōka Shock!" (教歌SHOCK!)	2016		
"Sai the Kou!" (最the高)	2018	Takuto Shimpo	
"MUGEN" (MUGEN)	2018	ZUMI	

=== Video albums ===
Title	Release date	Charts
Title	Release date	JPN Oricon Blu-ray
"Rock-A-Japonica Magical View The Story of Miracles" (ロッカジャポニカ Magical View キセキとキセキの物語)	April 25, 2018	54
