= Rinrin & Ranran =

Musical duo in Japan and Hong kong

Rinrin & Ranran (Japanese:リンリン・ランラン, also romanized as Lingling & Langlang or Linlin & Lanlan; known in Hong Kong as the Lokka Sisters, Chinese:樂家姊妹; b. January 3, 1959), were a musical duo in Japan and Hong Kong that were active in Japan during the 1970s.

The duo was born as Letilia and Katherine Barber and were twins. They debuted in Japan in April 1974 with the single "Koi no Indian Ningyou" (Indian Doll of Love). The single peaked at #27 on the Oricon chart list and sold over 84,000 copies. They produced 7 singles and 3 albums. Their last single in Japan was issued in 1976.

Letilia was married in 1980 and moved to Arizona. Shortly after, Katherine married in 1982 and has lived in California ever since.

== See also ==
- Kayōkyoku
- Japanese idol
- List of Japanese idols
