= Hotch Potchi =

Japanese boy band

Hotch Potchi (ハッチ ポッチ)
- Origin: Tokyo
- Genres: J-Pop
- Occupations: Singers
- Years active: 2005
- Labels: StarDust
- Members: Izawa Yuuki; Koshiyama Ryouta; Isamu Takashi; Ohsawa Aruka; Shimura Yuuki; Morishita Masaya (dog members: Hatch, Pottchi (Potsuchi))
- Website: Official Site

Hotch Potchi is a Japanese boy band group. The band was formed in 2005. Many of the original members quit, including lead singer Yousuke. They were replaced by new members.

== Profile ==
- Koshiyama Ryouta (越山 凌太) born January 24, 1992, from Ibaraki
- Izawa Yuuki (井澤 勇貴) born November 26, 1992, from Tokyo
- Morishita Masaya (森下 雅也)
- Shimura Yuuki (志村 勇樹)
- Ohsawa Aruka (大澤 歩佳)
- Isamu Takashi (勇貴)

== Former members ==
- Kurokawa Yousuke (黒川 洋介) born January 3, 1990, from Tokyo
- Fukuyama Seiji (福山 聖二) born September 17, 1990, from Tokyo
- Kawasaki Takeru (川崎 健) born October 31, 1988, from Shizuoka
- Kamiya Hayabusa (神谷隼也人)
- Himukai Shunpei (火向俊平)

== Dogs ==
- Hatch (ハッチくん)
- Pottchi (ポッチくん)-(Potsuchi)

== Singles ==
Album #	Information
1st	Surfin' Dog (Dog盤): Released: August 8, 2007
2nd	Surfin' Boys (Boys盤): Released: August 8, 2007

=== Television ===
TV Program	TV station
We Love Hotch Potchi	GYAO TV
Pet size set Pochi Tama	TV Tokyo system
Melodix	TV Tokyo System
