= Hachimitsu Rocket =

Japanese girl group

- Origin: Tokyo, Japan
- Genres: J-pop; pop
- Years active: 2014–2020
- Label: Pony Canyon
- Past members: Sora Tsukamoto; Mihuu; Shiho Hanayama; Maika Kimino; Reina Harima; Aoba Mori; Kanon Amemiya
- Website: http://www.hachimitsu-rocket.com/

Hachimitsu Rocket (はちみつロケット, stylized in English as Hachimitsu Rocket) is a Japanese girl idol group, formed by Stardust Promotion in November 2014. The group was graduated from 3B Junior in February 2018. The group was dissolved on April 26, 2020.

== Members ==
=== Current members ===
| Name | Birthdate | Notes |
|---|---|---|
| Tsukamoto Sora(塚本颯来) | November 7, 2001 (age 24) | |
| Mihuu (澪風) | June 1, 2000 (age 25) | |
| Hanayama Shiho (華山志歩) | January 24, 2000 (age 26) | oldest member |
| Kimino Maika (公野舞華) | December 20, 2001 (age 24) | |
| Harima Reina (播磨怜奈) | February 13, 2002 (age 24) | youngest member |
| Mori Aoba (森青葉) | May 12, 2001 (age 24) | |

=== Former members ===
| Name | Birthdate | Notes |
|---|---|---|
| Amemiya Kanon (雨宮かのん) | September 20, 1999 (age 26) | Ex leader, Ex member of Gachinko 3 |

== Discography ==
| Order | Title | Release date | Oricon weekly ranking | Sales |
Major
| 1 | Ougon no Shichinin | March 7, 2018 | 9 | 11,463 |
| 2 | Okashi na Watashi to Hachimitsu no Kimi | March 7, 2018 | 20 | 6,435 |
| 3 | Hanabi to Manga to Choko to Ame | August 8, 2018 | 8 | 15,552 |
| 4 | Chuken Hachi Kou | March 20, 2019 | 11 | 10,017 |
| 5 | Rocket Future | November 20, 2019 | 11 | 9,729 |
