= Hiromi Iwasaki =

Japanese female singer (born 1958)

Hiromi Iwasaki 岩崎 宏美

Background information
- Also known as: ヒロリン Hirorin
- Born: November 12, 1958 (age 67); Kōtō, Tokyo, Japan
- Genres: J-pop; Kayōkyoku
- Occupation: Singer
- Instrument: Vocals
- Years active: 1975–present
- Labels: Victor Entertainment (1975–2000); Imperial Records (2001 – )
- Website: three-g-company.co.jp

Hiromi Iwasaki (岩崎 宏美, Iwasaki Hiromi; born November 12, 1958) is a Japanese female singer who debuted in 1975. Her younger sister Yoshimi Iwasaki is also a singer. In 1981 she was awarded the Silver Prize at the Tokyo Music Festival for her song "Koimachigusa".

Her representative songs are "ロマンス" — "Romance" (1975), "思秋期" — "Shishūki" (1977) and "聖母たちのララバイ" — "Madonna Tachi No Lullaby" (1982). However, her most immediately recognizable hit song, "シンデレラ・ハネムーン" — "Cinderella Honeymoon" (1978) has been such a consistent feature of monomane talent Korokke's routines, Hiromi Iwasaki has commented that when the intro played in concerts, fans would laugh, so she has ceremonially "gifted" that song to Korokke, whose performance has elongated both their careers.

== Biography ==
Iwasaki made her official debut in April 1975 with the single "二重唱" — "Dyuetto", after winning a record contract on the popular Japanese talent competition show Star Tanjō! in the summer of 1974. The single peaked at no. 19, according to the Oricon charts. Its follow up, "Romance", peaked at no. 1, maintained its place for three weeks, and sold over a million units. It was written by Yu Aku and Kyohei Tsutsumi, and got her nominated for The Best Newcomer of the Year at the 17th edition of the Japan Record Awards, and made her first performance on the 26th edition of Kohaku Uta Gassen with this song. The disco inspired "Sentimental" was issued as a single in October of that same year, and with sales exceeding 700,000, became her second no. 1 hit, and maintained its place for two weeks. A string of hit singles was released throughout 1976 and 1977, most notably "Fantasy" (which peaked at no. 2), "Mirai" (no. 2), "Kiri No Meguri Ai" (no. 4), "Dream" (no. 4). and "Nettaigyo" (no. 4). The single "Shishūki" was released in late '77, and won her an award at the 19th edition of the Japan Record Awards, as well as an award at the 8th edition of the Japan Music Awards.

She continued to release big selling singles throughout the 1970s, and starred in her first rock opera, in the summer of 1979, as Ophelia in Shakespeares' Hamlet. In late '79 her single "Mangekyō", won her gold at the Japan Record Awards, as well as becoming the theme song for Subaru Leone.

The single "Sumire Iro No Namida" won her the "Best vocal performance" at the Japan Record Awards of 1981. "Sumire Iro No Namida" had sold 500,000 copies by September 1982.

In 1982 the song "Madonna Tachi No Lullaby" became her third no. 1; selling over a million units, and winning gold at the 21st edition of the Japan Record Awards.

In the 1980s Iwasaki began focusing on musicals, and in 1987 played Fantine in the Japanese version of Les Misérables. To this day she continues acting, singing, performing and hosting.

She represented Japan at the 1985 ABU Popular Song Contest.

== Discography ==
=== Charted Singles ===
#	Title	Release date/chart position
1	Dyuetto (二重唱, Duet); Debut single	1975-04-25 (#19)
2	Romansu (ロマンス, Romance); First appearance on Kohaku Uta Gassen; Nominated for Newcomer of the Year on the Japan Record Awards	1975-07-25 (#1)
3	Sentimentaru (センチメンタル, Sentimental)	1975-10-25 (#1)
4	Fantajī (ファンタジー, Fantasy)	1976-01-25 (#2)
5	Mirai (未来, The Future)	1976-05-01 (#2)
6	Kiri No Meguri Ai (霧のめぐり逢い, Love Affair in the Mist)	1976-08-01 (#4)
7	Dorīmu (ドリーム, Dream)	1976-11-05 (#4)
8	Omoide No Ki No Shita De (想い出の樹の下で, Under The Tree Of Memories)	1977-01-25 (#7)
9	Hiren Hakusho (悲恋白書, The White Book Of Tragic Love)	1977-04-25 (#8)
10	Nettaigyo (熱帯魚, Tropical Fish)	1977-07-05 (#4)
11	Shishūki (思秋期, Praying for the Fall); Nominated for The Best Popsong on the Japan Record Awards	1977-09-05 (#6)
12	Hatachi Mae (二十才前, Before The Age Of Twenty)	1978-02-05 (#10)
13	Azayaka Na Bamen (あざやかな場面, A Vivid Scene)	1978-05-05 (#14)
14	Shinderera Hanemūn (シンデレラ・ハネムーン, Cinderella Honeymoon); Awarded a Gold Medal on the Japan Record Awards	1978-07-25 (#13)
15	Sayonara No Banka (さよならの挽歌, I'll Say Goodbye, For A Better Tomorrow)	1978-11-05 (#13)
16	Haru Oboro (春おぼろ, The Fading Spring)	1979-02-05 (#15)
17	Natsu Ni Dakarete (夏に抱かれて, Embraced by the Summer)	1979-05-08 (#20)
18	Mangekyō (万華鏡, Kaleidoscope); Awarded a Gold Medal on the Japan Record Awards; CM Theme Song for Subaru Leone	1979-09-15 (#10)
19	Surō Na Ai Ga Ii Wa (スローな愛がいいわ, I Like It Slow)	1980-01-21 (#18)
20	Joyū (女優, Actress)	1980-04-05 (#15)
21	Ginga Densetsu (銀河伝説, Galaxy Legends (one of songs in "Be Forever Yamato"))	1980-08-05 (#18)
22	Ai No Inochi (愛の生命, Live And Love (one of songs in "Be Forever Yamato"))	1980-08-05 (#18)
23	Matenrō (摩天楼, Skyscraper)	1980-10-05 (#22)
24	Munasawagi (胸さわぎ, Butterfly)	1981-01-01 (#25)
25	Koimachigusa (恋待草, My Loved One Lying in the Grass); Awarded a Silver Medal on the Japan Music Awards	1981-03-21 (#26)
26	Sumire Iro No Namida (すみれ色の涙, Violet Coloured Tears); Awarded a Best Vocal Performance award on the Japan Record Awards	1981-06-05 (#6)
27	Rengesō No Koi (れんげ草の恋, Love The Grass Lotuses)	1981-10-21 (#19)
28	Remon (檸檬, Lemon)	1982-02-05 (#16)
29	Madonna Tachi No Rarabai (聖母たちのララバイ, A Lullaby For Madonna)	1982-04-21 (#1)
30	Omoidasanaide (思い出さないで, You Can't Recall)	1982-09-21 (#18)
31	Sutekina Kimochi (素敵な気持ち, A Lovely Feeling)	1983-02-21 (#32)
32	Shinju No Periodo (真珠のピリオド, Period of the Pearls)	1983-06-05 (#37)
33	Ieji (家路, Home); Award a Gold Medal at the Japan Record Awards	1983-08-21 (#4)
34	20 No Koi (20の恋, Love20)	1984-02-21 (#41)
35	Mikan No Shozo (未完の肖像, Unfinished Portrait)	1984-05-21 (#54)
36	Hashi (橋, Bridge)	1984-08-21 (#31)
37	Kesshin (決心, Decided)	1985-04-05 (#15)
38	Yume Kariudo (夢狩人, Dream Hunter)	1985-04-05 (#15)
39	Gekkō (月光, Moonlight)	1985-10-21 (#54)
40	25 Ji No Ai No Uta (25時の愛の歌, Love Song On 25)	1985-12-16 (#79)
41	Suki Ni Narazu Ni Irarenai (好きにならずにいられない, Can't Help Falling in Love)	1986-02-05 (#57)
42	Chiisana Tabi (小さな旅, A Small Journey); Theme song of the program Chiisana Tabi hosted by NHK	1986-06-21 (#52)
43	Yoru No Tenohira (夜のてのひら, Palm of the Night)	1986-10-21 (#55)
44	Saisho No Koibito Tachi (最初の恋人達, The First Lover)	1987-04-21 (#84)
45	Kaze No Juvenile (風の童話集, A Fairytale in the Wind)	1987-11-01 (#89)
46	Last Cruise (ラスト・クルーズ)	1987-11-01 (#89)
47	Kikoetekuru Rhapsody (聞こえてくるラプソディー, The Rhapsody I Can Hear)	1988-05-21
48	Miseinen (未成年, Underaged)	1988-12-16 (#83)
49	Yumemiru You Ni Aishitai (夢見るように愛したい, Want to love you dreamily)	1989-06-07
50	Ai Wo Plus One (愛を+ワン, Add One More Love)	1992-01-21
51	Ai To Iu Na No Yūki (愛という名の勇気, The Courage Called Love)	1993-01-21 (#60)
52	Life	1993-07-21
53	Asa Ga Kuru Made (朝が来るまで, Until Morning Comes)	1995-10-21
54	Believin'	1996-11-21
55	Ai Ga Ippai (愛がいっぱい, Full Of Love)	1997-09-22
56	Yurusanai (許さない, Won't Forgive You)	1999-03-03
57	Boku no Besuto Furendo e (ぼくのベストフレンドへ, To My Best Friend); Pokémon ending theme	2001-02-07 (#64)
58	Atokata Mo Naku (あとかたもなく, Without A Trace)	2001-05-09
59	Yume (夢, Dream)	2001-09-21
60	Tomatta Tokei (止まった時計, Stopped Clock)	2002-10-02
61	Anata No Kokoro Ni (あなたの心に, To Your Heart)	2003-04-23
62	Tegami (手紙, The Letters)	2004-09-23 (#147)
63	Tada Ai No Tame Ni Dake (ただ・愛のためにだけ, Only For Love)	2005-03-24 (#93)
64	Shiawase No Kakera (シアワセノカケラ, Fragments Of Happiness)	2007-03-21 (#156)
65	Hajimari No Uta, Anata E (始まりの詩、あなたへ, A Poem Just for You); Used in the motion picture Noto No Hanayome	2008-04-14 (#90)
66	Inochi No Riyū (いのちの理由, The Reason Of Life)	2012-04-04 (#63)
67	Anata E ~Itsumademo Itsudemo~ (あなたへ 〜いつまでも いつでも〜, To You ~Forever Always~)	2012-10-03 (#88)
68	Toki No Hari (時の針, Stylus of Time)	2013-10-09 (#119)
69	Thank You! (Thank You!, Thank You!)	2014-05-21 (#117)
70	Hikari No Kiseki (光の軌跡, Trajectory of Light)	2015-04-22 (#131)
71	Kizuna (絆, Bond)	2017-05-24 (#144)
72	Sukida Nante Ienakatta (好きだなんて言えなかった, I Really Can't Say I Love You)	2021-11-24 (#)

=== Charted albums ===
#	Title	Release date/chart position
1	The Blue Sky (あおぞら, Aozora); Debut album, featuring first two singles	1975-09-05 (#4)
2	Fantasy (ファンタジー)	1976-02-10 (#2)
3	Zeppelin (飛行船, Hikōsen)	1976-07-25 (#3)
4	With My Best Friends (ウィズ・ベスト・フレンズ)	1977-05-25 (#7)
5	Men And Women (男と女, Otoko To Onna)	1977-10-05 (#3)
6	Before The Age Of Twenty (二十才前..., Hatachi Mae)	1978-04-05 (#10)
7	Pandora's Box (パンドラの小箱, Pandora No Kobako)	1978-08-25 (#11)
8	10 Carat Diamonds (10カラット・ダイヤモンド)	1979-10-05 (#11)
9	Wish (WISH)	1980-05-05 (#14)
10	Salvia (緋衣草, Sarubia)	1981-07-05 (#21)
11	Alone at Dusk (夕暮れから…ひとり, Yūgure Kara... Hitori)	1982-07-05 (#4)
12	Love Letter (Love Letter)	1982-11-05 (#14)
13	I'm in Heaven (私・的・空・間, Shi Teki Kū Kan)	1983-07-21 (#31)
14	I Won't Break Your Heart (I WON'T BREAK YOUR HEART)	1984-04-21 (#39)
15	Charmaine (戯夜曼, Giyaman)	1985-06-05 (#13)
16	Cinema (cinema)	1985-11-21 (#40)
17	Self-Indulgence (わがまま, Wagamama)	1986-07-21 (#32)
18	Greed (よくばり, Yokubari)	1987-07-21 (#38)
19	Me Too (Me too)	1988-07-21 (#92)
