= Team Shachi =

Japanese female idol group

TEAM SHACHI
- Also known as: Team Syachihoko
- Origin: Nagoya, Aichi, Japan
- Genres: J-pop; pop
- Years active: 2011–2025
- Members: Honoka Akimoto; Haruna Sakamoto; Nao Sakura; Yuzuki Ōguro
- Past members: Yuzu Andō; Chiyuri Itō
- Website: Official website

Team Shachi (stylized as TEAM SHACHI), formerly Team Syachihoko (チームしゃちほこ), is a Japanese female idol group consisting of four girls from the city of Nagoya.

== Overview ==
Team Syachihoko is a sister group of two other girl groups managed by the Stardust Promotion talent agency, Momoiro Clover Z and Shiritsu Ebisu Chugaku and, having been formed in 2011, is the "youngest sister" of the three.

The group was created of six girls from Aichi Prefecture. As of 2012, all members lived in Nagoya, the capital of the prefecture, and were junior high school students. In April 2013, five of them started high school, and Haruna Sakamoto was the only one who was still in junior high at the time.

From April 5, 2013, Team Syachihoko has its own regular TV show, broadcast on Nagoya TV.

== History ==
Team Syachihoko was formed in 2011 by 3B Junior, the third section of Stardust Promotion. In April 2012, the group debuted live on the streets of Nagoya (on the Nishinomaru Square), and continued with more events in the Nagoya area.

In the summer of 2012, Team Syachihoko participated in a nationwide concert series titled "HMV Idol Gakuen presents Nihon Jyūdan Idol Ranbu 2012", appearing at two concerts: on August 10 in Nagoya and on August 23 in Tokyo. During the August 10 performance, the group announced that it would soon release its first major-label single, on October 31 on the Warner Music Japan record label. The single was labeled the "Nagoya major-debut single" and was supported by a concert tour across the city of Nagoya. On September 2, at the first concert of the tour, the group appeared in stage costumes looking like bowling uniforms and unveiled the title song of the upcoming single, titled "The Stardust Bowling". The song, written and composed by Takashi Asano, who had already authored two indie songs for the band, told a story of a bowling ball that, after being thrown, overcame various difficulties on its way along the lane and finished with a strike. The Japanese edition of Rolling Stone called the song "cute and humorous", with a "dramatic melody", "brilliantly following the style of Momoiro Clover and Shiritsu Ebisu Chugaku". The single reached 17th place in the weekly Oricon charts.

During the Nagoya tour, which took place from September 2 to November 4, the girls faced various challenges presented by the band's manager, such as "Yuzu and Yuzuki don't eat sweets in the dressing room while on tour", "1000 sumultaneous viewers on the Ustream broadcast", etc. Each won challenge equalled one "crown" (point). The group had to collect 10 crowns to be granted a first solo concert and a nationwide major-label debut. The band won 13 crowns and received the right to hold a solo concert on December 30 at Nagoya's Club Quattro, but the release of the promised single was delayed for three months with the reason stated by Team Syachihoko's manager Hasegawa to be that the 13 crowns were more than the target number of 10. All the 500 tickets for the concert were sold out. The performance was released as the group's first live DVD on April 24, 2013.

On December 24, 2012, and on April 7, 2013, Team Syachihoko released two limitedly distributed singles, sold at the band's live events. The first single was titled "Otome Juken Sensō" ("Girls' Entrance Exam War") and was issued in a total of 7,777 serial-numbered copies. By February 13, it had been sold out. The follow-up, called "Otome Juken Sensō: Another War", was printed in 8,888 copies.

The group released its next single on June 19, 2013. It was titled "Shuto Iten Keikaku" ("Plan for the Relocation of the Capital") and was marketed as their "pre-nationwide-major-debut single" (日本先行メジャーデビューシングル).

On October 30, 2013, the group's fifth single "Ai no Chikyūsai" ("Charity Earth Festival") was released.

On November 18, 2015, it was announced that Yuzu Ando would go on temporary hiatus due to being diagnosed with vertigo. By February 10, 2016, the status of Ando's hiatus changed from temporary to indefinite due to her ongoing health issues. On September 29, 2016, Yuzu Ando graduated from the group and Team Syachihoko continued activities as a five-person idol group.

On August 3, 2018, Team Syachihoko announced on LINE LIVE that Chiyuri Itō would perform her final live concert with the group on October 22 and graduate. On October 22, 2018, the group announced its renaming to Team Shachi (stylized as TEAM SHACHI) effective 23 October.

On February 28, 2025, Team Shachi made an announcement that they would disband at the end 2025 after 14 years of activity. Two final concerts for the group are scheduled to take place: one in Tokyo on September 21 and one in Nagoya on December 13.

== Members ==
Name	Birth date	Age	Image color	Notes
Honoka Akimoto (秋本帆華)	November 15, 1997	28	Nagoya red (名古屋レッド)	Leader
Haruna Sakamoto (坂本遥奈)	February 2, 1999	27	Tebasaki yellow-green (手羽先キミドリ)	
Nao Sakura (咲良菜緒)	September 10, 1997	28	Dragon's blue (ドラゴンズブルー)	Sub-Leader
Yuzuki Ōguro (大黒柚姫)	July 18, 1997	28	Murasaki purple (subject to change) (紫パープル(仮))	

=== Former members ===
Name	Birth date	Age	Image color
Yuzu Andō (安藤ゆず)	September 26, 1997	28	Pony pink (ポニーピンク)
Chiyuri Itō (伊藤千由李)	January 24, 1998	28	Uirō yellow (ういろうイエロー)

=== Timeline ===
- Black (vertical) = Hiatus

== Discography ==
=== Studio albums ===
List of albums, with selected chart positions
Title	Album details	Peak positions	
Title	Album details	JPN Oricon	JPN Hot Albums (Note: Sources for chart positions are as follows: Ii ja Nai ka, Ee ja Nai ka, Team)
Himatsubushi (ひまつぶし; "Killing Time")	Released: August 20, 2014; Label: Warner Music Japan; Formats: CD, CD/DVD, digital download	3	— (Note: Charted at number 3 on the Top Albums chart, which exclusively tracks physical sales.)
Owari to Hajimari (おわりとはじまり; "The End and the Beginning")	Released: February 22, 2017; Label: Warner Music Japan; Formats: CD, CD/Blu-ray, digital download	10	
Syachi Best 2012–2017	Released: October 18, 2017; Label: Warner Music Japan; Formats: CD, CD/Blu-ray, digital download	6	
Team	Released: February 16, 2022; Label: Warner Music Japan; Formats: CD, digital download	6	8

=== Compilation albums ===
Title	Album details
Team Syachihoko Nyūmonhen (チームしゃちほこ入門編; "Team Syachihoko Introductory Compilation")	Released: July 2, 2014; Label: Warner; Formats: digital download
Team Syachihoko Jitsuyōhen (チームしゃちほこ入門編; "Team Syachihoko Practical Compilation")	Released: July 24, 2015; Label: Warner; Formats: digital download

=== Extended plays ===
List of extended plays, with selected chart positions
Title	EP details	Peak positions	
Title	EP details	JPN Oricon	JPN Hot Albums
Tokijikake no Unit-tachi Vol. 1 (時計じかけのユニットたちvol.1; "Clockwork Units: Vol. 1")	Released: December 21, 2013; Label: Warner; Formats: CD	—	—
Tokijikake no Unit-tachi Vol. 2 (時計じかけのユニットたちvol.1; "Clockwork Units: Vol. 2")	Released: May 9, 2015; Label: Warner; Formats: CD	—	—
Ii ja Nai ka (いいじゃないか; "Isn't It Okay?")	Released: September 30, 2015; Label: Warner; Formats: CD, CD/DVD, CD/Blu-ray, digital download	6	9
Ee ja Nai ka (ええじゃないか; "Isn't It Okay?")	Released: October 23, 2015; Label: Warner; Formats: CD, CD/Blu-ray, digital download	3	4
Team Shachi	Released: February 13, 2019; Label: Warner; Formats: CD, CD/Blu-ray, digital download	5	5
Mai no Chouten o Kiwameshi Toki, Watashitachi wa Ikanaru Konnan o Mo Uchiyaburu (舞いの頂点を極めし時、私達は如何なる困難をも打ち破る; When We Reach the Peak of Our Dance, We Will Overcome Any Difficulties)	Released: November 23, 2022; Label: Waku Waku; Formats: CD, digital download	6	—
"—" denotes items which did not chart, or items that were ineligible to chart because no physical CD edition was produced.

=== Singles ===
==== As lead artists ====
List of singles, with selected chart positions.
Title	Year	Peak chart positions		Album
Title	Year	JPN Oricon	JPN Hot 100 (Note: Sources for chart positions are as follows: "Shuto Iten Keikaku", "Ai no Chikyūsai", "Ii Kurashi", "Shampoo Hat", "Tensai Bakabon", "Feel".)	Album
"Koibito wa Sniper" (恋人はスナイパー; "My Lover Is a Sniper")	2012	—	—	Non-album singles (Note: "Koibito wa Sniper", "Goburei! Syachihoko Deluxe", "Triple Seven" and "The Stardust Bowling" were compiled onto the group's digital compilation album Team Syachihoko Nyūmonhen. Warner Music Japan re-released "Koibito wa Sniper" / "Goburei! Syachihoko Deluxe" and "Triple Seven" on August 24, 2012.)
"Goburei! Syachihoko Deluxe" (ごぶれい!しゃちほこでらックス; "Rude! Syachihoko Deluxe")	2012	—	—	Non-album singles
"Triple Seven" (トリプルセブン, Toripuru Sebun)	2012	—	—	Non-album singles
"The Stardust Bowling" (ザ・スターダストボウリング, Za Sutādasuto Bōringu)	2012	17	— (Note: Charted at number 28 on the Top Single Sales chart, which exclusively tracks physical sales.)	Non-album singles
"Otome Juken Sensō" (乙女受験戦争; "Girl Exam War") (Note: "Otome Juken Sensō" and a re-released edition "Otome Juken Sensō (Another War)" were issued in, limited runs of 7,777 and 8,888 copies respectively, and were sold at Team Syachihoko's concerts.)	2012	—	—	Himatsubushi
"Shuto Iten Keikaku" (首都移転計画; "Capital Relocation Project")	2013	11	24	Himatsubushi
"Ai no Chikyūsai" (愛の地球祭; "Earth Festival of Love")	2013	5	46	Himatsubushi
"Ii Kurashi" (いいくらし; "Good Living")	2014	2	14	Himatsubushi
"Shampoo Hat" (シャンプーハット, Shampū Hatto)	2014	4	22	Owari To Hajimari
"Tensai Bakabon" (天才バカボン) (Note: Cover of the 1971 Tensai Bakabon theme song, originally performed by Idol Four.)	2015	4	18	Owari To Hajimari
"Kaijū Tottoto" (怪獣トットト; "Monster Tottoto")	2015	37	— (Note: Charted at number 40 on the Top Single Sales chart, which exclusively tracks physical sales.)	Non-album singles
"Jirijiri Natsukatsu Iinkai" (じりじり夏活委員会; "Running Out of Time Summer Club") (featuring Shimajirō)	2015	37	—	Non-album singles
"Cherie!"	2016	2	—	Owari to Hajimari
"Ultra Chou Miracle Super Very Power Ball" (Ultra 超 Miracle Super Very Power Ball)	2016	8	—	Owari to Hajimari
"Jump Man"	2018	8	—	Non-album singles
"Burning Festival" (with Radio Fish)	2018	3	—	Non-album singles
"Rocket Queen"	2019	3	—	Team
"SURVIVOR SURVIVOR / MAMA"	2020	—	—	Team
"JIBUNGOTO"	2020	—	—	Team
"HONEY / AWAKE"	2021	—	—	Team
"HORIZON"	2022	—	—	Team
"Buchopa" (舞頂破)	2022	—	—	
"—" denotes items which did not chart, or items that were ineligible to chart because the single did not receive a release outside of concerts.

==== As featured artists ====
List of singles, with selected chart positions
Title	Year	Peak chart positions	Album
Title	Year	JPN Hot 100	Album
"Back 2 the Wild (Japanese version)" (with Basement Jaxx)	2015	—	Non-album single
"Feel" (among Unborde All Stars)	2016	53	Feel + Unborde Greatest Hits

=== Video albums ===
==== Live albums ====
List of media, with selected chart positions
Title	Album details	Peak positions	
Title	Album details	JPN DVD	JPN Blu-ray
Hatsu One-man Man Live: Kimi e no Omoi Jiki Shōsō (初ワンマンライブ（決）～君への想い時期尚早～)	Released: April 24, 2013; Label: Warner; Formats: DVD, Blu-ray	136	61
ZeppZeppHep World Premium Japan Tour 2013: Mikirihassha wa Mitsu no Aji (ZeppZeppHep World Premium Japan Tour 2013~見切り発車は蜜の味)	Released: August 14, 2013; Label: Warner; Formats: DVD, Blu-ray	74	14
Team Syachihoko Summer Festival 2013: Ryaku shite "Syachi-sama♪" (チームしゃちほこサマーフェスティバル２０１３～略して“しゃちサマ♪”)	Released: December 4, 2013; Label: Warner; Formats: DVD, Blu-ray	86	14
3B Junior Live Final: Ore no Fujii (3Bjunior LIVE FINAL 俺の藤井 2014)	Released: April 23, 2014; Label: Warner; Formats: DVD, Blu-ray	28	8
Team Syachihoko Ai no Chikyū Matsuri 2013 in Aichi-ken Taiikukan (チームしゃちほこ愛の地球祭り 2013 in 愛知県体育館)	Released: May 28, 2014; Label: Warner; Formats: DVD, Blu-ray	34	29
Syachi Summer 2014: Kamigami no Matsuri at Nippon Budokan (しゃちサマ2014～神々の祭り～at 日本武道館)	Released: December 24, 2014; Label: Warner; Formats: DVD, Blu-ray	62	25
Syachi Mōde 2015 at Aichi-ken Taiikukan (鯱詣2015 at 愛知県体育館)	Released: May 27, 2015; Label: Warner; Formats: DVD, Blu-ray	39	26
Syachi Summer 2015: JK Saigo no Natsuyasumi (しゃちサマ 2015 ～JK最後の夏休み～)	Released: May 27, 2015; Label: Warner; Formats: DVD, Blu-ray	31	21
Syachi Summer 2015: JK Saigo no Natsuyasumi (しゃちサマ 2015 ～JK最後の夏休み～)	Released: May 27, 2015; Label: Warner; Formats: DVD, Blu-ray	31	21

==== Variety releases ====
List of media, with selected chart positions
Title	Album details	Peak positions
Title	Album details	JPN DVD
Team Syachihoko's "Yuru Syachi" Vol. 1 (チームしゃちほこの『ゆるしゃち』 Vol.1)	Released: March 26, 2014; Label: Warner; Formats: DVD	48
Team Syachihoko's "Yuru Syachi" Vol. 2 (チームしゃちほこの『ゆるしゃち』 Vol.2)	Released: March 26, 2014; Label: Warner; Formats: DVD	57
Team Syachihoko's "Yuru Syachi" Vol. 3 (チームしゃちほこの『ゆるしゃち』 Vol.3)	Released: March 26, 2014; Label: Warner; Formats: DVD	61
Team Syachihoko's "Yuru Syachi" Vol. 4 (チームしゃちほこの『ゆるしゃち』 Vol.4)	Released: September 24, 2014; Label: Warner; Formats: DVD	29
Team Syachihoko's "Yuru Syachi" Vol. 5 (チームしゃちほこの『ゆるしゃち』 Vol.5)	Released: September 24, 2014; Label: Warner; Formats: DVD	30
Team Syachihoko's "Yuru Syachi" Vol. 6 (チームしゃちほこの『ゆるしゃち』 Vol.6)	Released: July 8, 2015; Label: Warner; Formats: DVD	25
Team Syachihoko's "Yuru Syachi" Vol. 7 (チームしゃちほこの『ゆるしゃち』 Vol.7)	Released: July 8, 2015; Label: Warner; Formats: DVD	27
Team Syachihoko's "Syachi-tabi Chūgoku Dalian-hen (チームしゃちほこの『鯱旅～中国・大連編～』)	Released: December 2, 2015; Label: Warner; Formats: DVD	25
Yurusyachi SP: Ketta de Iko Mai! (ゆるしゃちSP『ケッタで行こまい!』)	Released: January 22, 2016; Label: Warner; Formats: DVD	23
