= B.O.L.T =

Japanese idol group

- Origin: Japan
- Genres: J-pop; pop
- Years active: 2019 - 2023
- Label: Evil Line / King
- Past members: Luna Naitō; Chiho Takai; Aya Shirahama; Nanoha Aoyama; Misato Hirase
- Website: www.sdp-bolt.jp

B.O.L.T is a Japanese girl idol group managed by Stardust Promotion. It was formed in 2019 with five members, 3 of them were former members of Rock A Japonica:Luna Naitō, Chiho Takai, and Misato Hirase.

The group debuted on July 15, 2019, with their first performance being at the "EVIL A LIVE 2019" festival. Their debut was followed with performances at events such as the 2019 Tokyo Idol Festival, the 2019 Gyu Agricultural festival, and the NewYear Platinum Party 2020.

== Members ==
Name	Birthdate	Notes
Luna Naitō (内藤るな)	December 23, 2000 (age 25)	
Chiho Takai (高井千帆)	November 20, 2001 (age 24)	
Aya Shirahama (白浜あや)	April 11, 2008 (age 17)	
Nanoha Aoyama (青山菜花)	September 10, 2008 (age 17)	

=== Former members ===
Name	Birthdate	Notes
Misato Hirase (平瀬美里)	August 6, 2002 (age 23)	Graduated on November 15, 2019

== Discography ==
=== Singles ===
Nº	Title	Release date	Comments	Charts	Album
Nº	Title	Release date	Comments	JPN Oricon	Album
-	"Hoshi ga furu machi/ Yofuke no Prologue" (星が降る街 / 夜更けのプロローグ)	August 23, 2019	Digital release	-	—N/a
-	"Koko kara" (ここから)	November 15, 2019	Only sold in limited events	-	—N/a
-	"Chū ni ukugurai" (宙に浮くぐらい)	January 15, 2020	Digital release	-	—N/a
-	"SLEEPY BUSTERS" (SLEEPY BUSTERS)	February 7, 2020	Digital release	-	—N/a
-	"Ashioto" (足音)	May 13, 2020	Digital Release	-	"POP" (POP)
-	"BON-NO-BORN" (BON-NO-BORN)	June 5, 2020	Digital Release	-	"POP" (POP)
-	"axis" (axis)	June 26, 2020	Digital Release		"POP" (POP)
1	"Don't Blink" (Don't Blink)	December 9, 2020	Marketed as 1st single.	15	—N/a
2	"Smile Flower" (スマイルフラワー)	May 19, 2021	.	13	—N/a
-	"On the night after the sunset" (夕日の後の夜に)	July 15, 2021	2nd Anniversary Digital Single	-	—N/a
-	"Mikansei kokyū" (未完成呼吸)	July 30, 2021	Digital release	-	"Attitude" (Attitude)
-	"Yummy!" (Yummy!)	August 13, 2021	Digital release	-	"Attitude" (Attitude)
-	"Please Together" (Please Together)	August 27, 2021	Digital release	-	"Attitude" (Attitude)
3	"More Fantastic" (More Fantastic)	December 15, 2021	.	16	—N/a
-	"New Day Rising" (New Day Rising)	July 1, 2022	Digital release		"Weather" (Weather)
-	"On the night after the sunset(H.O.H. REMIX)" (夕日の後の夜に(H.O.H. REMIX))	July 15, 2022	Digital release		—N/a
-	"BY MY SIDE" (BY MY SIDE)	July 22, 2022	Digital release		"Weather" (Weather)
-	"Yoru o nukedashite" (夜を抜け出して)	August 3, 2022	Digital release		"Weather" (Weather)
4	"Accent" (Accent)	December 14, 2022	.	12	—N/a

=== Albums ===
Title	Release date	Charts
Title	Release date	JPN Oricon
"POP" (POP)	July 15, 2020	14
"Attitude" (Attitude)	September 1, 2021	16
"Weather" (Weather)	August 10, 2022	7

== Videography ==
=== Music videos ===
Title	Year	Director(s)	Ref.
"Chū ni ukugurai" (宙に浮くぐらい)	2020		
"axis" (axis)	2020	Ryo Morita (森田亮)	
"Don't Blink" (Don't Blink)	2020	ZUMI (ZUMI)	
"Smile Flower" (スマイルフラワー)	2021	Takaya Ohaya (大畑貴耶)	
"Yummy!" (Yummy!)	2021	ZUMI (ZUMI)	
"More Fantastic" (More Fantastic)	2021	ZUMI (ZUMI)	
"BY MY SIDE" (BY MY SIDE)	2022	ZUMI (ZUMI)	With English subtitles
"Accent" (Accent)	2022	Shintaro Yoden (余田慎太郎)	With English subtitles
