= Tacoyaki Rainbow =

Japanese idol group

- Also known as: Takoniji
- Origin: Japan
- Genres: J-pop, EDM
- Years active: 2012–2022
- Labels: SDR (2013-2015); Avex Trax (2016–2022)
- Past members: Kurumi Hori; Karen Negishi; Mai Haruna; Sakura Ayaki; Saki Kiyoi; Maria Arai; Yuka Koike; Towa Narasaki
- Website: tacoyaki-rainbow.jp

Tacoyaki Rainbow (たこやきレインボー, Takoyaki Reinbō) was a Japanese female idol group under the management of Stardust Promotion. They come from the Kansai region. On April 18, 2021, Tacoyaki Rainbow announced that their members will "graduate" from the group on May 9 the same year. The group was supposed to go on a reboot after that, but due to various problems, on March 31, 2022, it was announced that it would disband instead. The group's last-ever activity was on May 4, 2022, at the Asia and Pacific Trade Center.

== Members ==
Name	Birth date	Image color
Kurumi Hori (堀くるみ)	December 18, 1999 (age 26)	Purple -Leader
Karen Negishi (根岸 可蓮)	November 18, 2000 (age 25)	Green
Mai Haruna (春名 真依)	January 5, 2001 (age 25)	Blue
Sakura Ayaki (彩木 咲良)	March 26, 2002 (age 24)	Pink
Saki Kiyoi (清井 咲希)	August 5, 1999 (age 26)	Yellow -Center
Towa Narasaki (奈良崎 とわ)	February 21, 2000 (age 26)	Red -Former Leader
Maria Arai (新井まりあ)	July 21, 2000 (age 25)	Yellow
Yuka Koike (小池優花)	December 31, 1998 (age 27)	Orange

== Discography ==
=== Indie Singles ===
No.	Title	Release date	Oricon Weekly Singles Chart	Sales
1	"Over the Tacoyaki Rainbow" (オーバー･ザ･たこやきレインボー)	September 17, 2013	31	2,376
2	"Naniwa no Haniwa" (なにわのはにわ)	March 19, 2014	10	
3	"Zesshō! Naniwa de Umareta Shōjotachi" (絶唱！なにわで生まれた少女たち)	September 3, 2014	13	11,729
4	"Genki Uri no Shōjo ~Naniwa Meika Gojussen~" (元気売りの少女〜浪花名歌五十選〜)	May 20, 2015	8	12,481
5	"Kuri Bocchi ONE DAY!!" (クリぼっちONE DAY!!)	December 16, 2015	11	14,890

=== Major-label singles ===
No.	Title	Release date	Oricon Weekly Singles Chart	Sales
1	"Nanairo Dance" (ナナイロダンス)	April 13, 2016	7	14,212
2	"Dot jp Japan!" (どっとjpジャパーン!)	August 24, 2016	10	14,622
3	"RAINBOW～Watashi wa Watashi Yanen Kara～" (RAINBOW～私は私やねんから～)	May 10, 2017	7	13,379
4	"Money!! Money!? Money!!" (まねー!!マネー!?Money!!)	September 20, 2017	4	14,274
5	"Motto Motto Motto Hanasou Yo - Digital Native Generation" (もっともっともっと話そうよ-Digital Native Generation-)	October 23, 2019	4	19,224
6	"Koi no Dungeon UME" (恋のダンジョンUME)	July 8, 2020	20	945

=== Albums ===
No.	Title	Release date	Oricon Weekly Singles Chart	Sales
1	"Maido! Ookini!" (まいど!おおきに!)	December 21, 2016	18	7,170
2	"Double Rainbow" (ダブルレインボー)	February 21, 2018	8	6,499
3	"Nantaiteki na Voyage" (軟体的なボヤージュ)	February 27, 2019	13	10,997
