= Arashi discography =

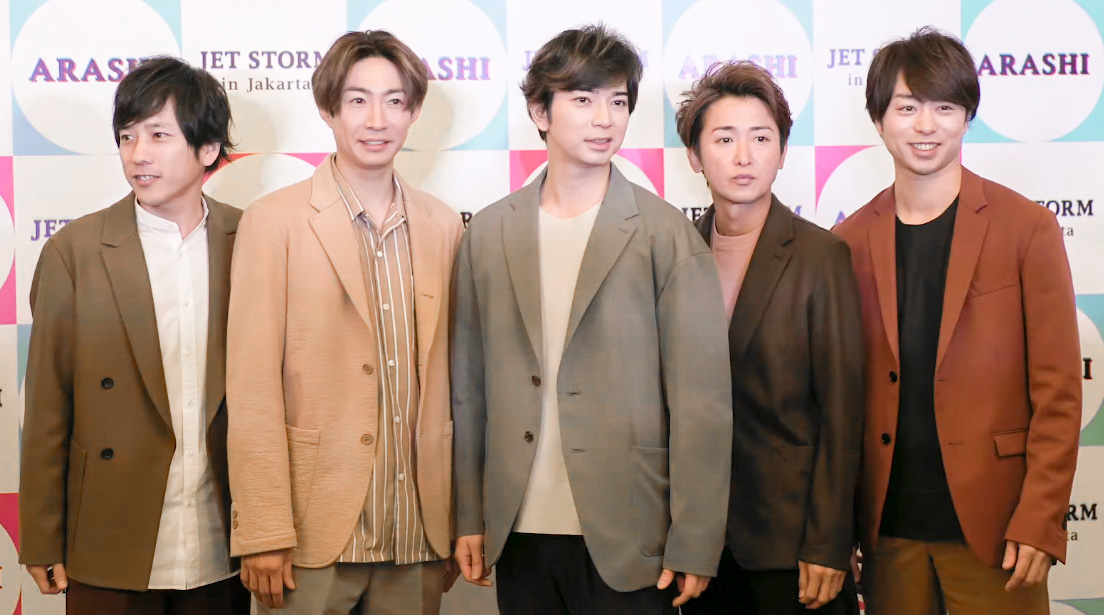
- Arashi in Jakarta in 2019
- Studio albums: 17
- Soundtrack albums: 2
- Compilation albums: 6
- Singles: 58
- Video albums: 2
- Music videos: 82
- Concert videos: 25

The discography of Arashi, a Japanese boy band, consists of 17 studio albums, six compilation albums, one extended play, 58 singles, four promotional singles, 25 concert videos and two video albums. Arashi has also released 82 music videos, including "All or Nothing", "Lucky Man", "Mada Minu Sekai e", "P・A・R・A・D・O・X", "Kokoro no Sora", "Don't You Get It", "Mikan", and "5x20".

The group's first release was the eponymous single "Arashi", which was the image song for the 8th World Cup of Volleyball hosted by Japan in 1999. Selling close to a million copies by the end of its chart run, it was the group's highest-selling single until the release of "Kite" in 2020.

Nearly a year and a half after their debut, Arashi released their first studio album Arashi No.1 Ichigou: Arashi wa Arashi o Yobu!. Like "Arashi", it also peaked at number one on the Oricon charts. Until the release of their tenth anniversary compilation album All the Best! 1999–2009, Arashi No.1 Ichigou: Arashi wa Arashi o Yobu! remained the group's best-selling album with overall sales of 323,030 for nearly ten years. They also became the fifth artist in history to dominate the top two placings on the annual Oricon singles chart with "Truth/Kaze no Mukō e" at first and "One Love" in 2008. Such a feat had not been achieved since 1989.

On December 18, 2009, Oricon announced that Arashi topped the annual singles, albums and music DVD rankings for 2009 in Japan. All of the group's 2009 singles ranked within the top five placings on the Oricon singles charts: "Believe/Kumorinochi, Kaisei" at number one, "Ashita no Kioku/Crazy Moon: Kimi wa Muteki" at number two, "My Girl" at number three and "Everything" at number five. Furthermore, the group became the first artist in history to monopolize the top two spots on the singles charts for two consecutive years and to have four releases in the top five. On the Oricon album charts, All the Best! 1999–2009 became the best-selling album of 2009 in Japan by selling over 1.43 million copies, making it the first time Arashi has topped annual album charts.

As of August 2020, Arashi has 54 number-one singles; 47 of which are consecutive since "Pikanchi Double" (February 2004). Arashi also became the first act to have 40 consecutive singles to rank within the Top 3 since their debut. As of 2019, Arashi have sold over 38 million records in Japan. On February 7, 2020, Arashi released all 16 original albums worldwide in digital form, not including compilation or soundtrack albums. In total, 256 songs available in addition to the singles previously released.

As part of the activities to celebrate the group's 25th anniversary, it was revealed that 70 music videos would be uploaded to YouTube, their "5×20 All the BEST!! 1999-2019" would receive a revamp, making a special edition in Dolby Atmos, and that 12 of their concert videos would be released on BluRay, all this on November 3, 2024, their 25th debut anniversary.

== Albums ==
=== Studio albums ===
Title	Album details	Peak chart positions					Sales (Note: Sales provided by Oricon database.)	Certifications
Title	Album details	JPN	KOR (Note: The Gaon Album Chart was established in February 2010.)	KOR Int.	TWN (Note: The G-Music chart was established in July 2005 and only archives the top 20 releases.)	TWN East Asia (Note: Positions were taken from "One", 2005 week 33; "Arashic", 2006 week 29; "Dream "A" Live", 2008 week 19; "Boku no Miteiru Fūkei", 2010 week 34; The Digitalian, 2014 week 46; "Are You Happy?", 2017 week 1.)	Sales	Certifications
Arashi No.1 Ichigou: Arashi wa Arashi o Yobu!	Released: January 24, 2001; Label: Pony Canyon; Format: CD	1	—	—	—	—	323,030	RIAJ: Platinum
Here We Go!	Released: July 17, 2002; Label: J Storm; Format: CD	2	—	—	—	—	147,811	RIAJ: Gold
How's It Going?	Released: July 9, 2003; Label: J Storm; Format: CD	2	—	—	—	—	115,180	RIAJ: Gold
Iza, Now!	Released: July 21, 2004; Label: J Storm; Format: CD, CD+DVD	1	—	—	—	—	151,528	RIAJ: Gold
One	Released: August 3, 2005; Label: J Storm; Format: CD, CD+DVD	1	—	—	—	3	151,840	RIAJ: Gold
Arashic	Released: July 5, 2006; Label: J Storm; Format: CD, CD+DVD	1	—	1	8	2	165,211	RIAJ: Gold
Time	Released: July 11, 2007; Label: J Storm; Format: CD, CD+DVD	1	—	—	6	1	313,833	RIAJ: Platinum
Dream "A" Live	Released: April 23, 2008; Label: J Storm; Format: 2CD, CD	1	—	—	6	1	322,107	RIAJ: Platinum
Boku no Miteiru Fūkei	Released: August 4, 2010; Label: J Storm; Format: 2CD	1	11	1	9	3	1,132,225	RIAJ: Million
Beautiful World	Released: July 6, 2011; Label: J Storm; Format: CD	1	6	2	5	1	937,656	RIAJ: Million
Popcorn	Released: October 31, 2012; Label: J Storm; Format: CD	1	13	1	6	1	951,690	RIAJ: 3× Platinum
Love	Released: October 23, 2013; Label: J Storm; Format: CD, CD+DVD	1	11	3	10	1	848,049	RIAJ: 3× Platinum
The Digitalian	Released: October 22, 2014; Label: J Storm; Format: CD, CD+DVD	1	29	7	5	1	823,315	RIAJ: 3× Platinum
Japonism	Released: October 21, 2015; Label: J Storm; Format: CD+DVD, 2CD, 2CD	1	59	10	—	2	1,023,278	RIAJ: Million
Are You Happy?	Released: October 26, 2016; Label: J Storm; Format: CD, CD+DVD	1	43	4	—	3	776,288	RIAJ: 3× Platinum
Untitled	Released: October 18, 2017; Label: J Storm; Format: CD, CD+DVD	1	31	1	—	—	814,299	RIAJ: 3× Platinum
This Is Arashi	Released: November 3, 2020; Label: J Storm; Format: CD, CD+DVD, CD+Blu-ray	1	—	—	—	1	905,869	RIAJ: 3× Platinum
"—" denotes items which were not released in that country or failed to chart.

=== Compilation albums ===
Title	Album details	Peak chart positions						Sales (Note: Sales provided by Oricon database.)	Certifications
Title	Album details	JPN	JPN Comb. (Note: The Oricon Combined Albums Chart was established in December 2018.)	KOR	KOR Int.	TWN	TWN East Asia	Sales	Certifications
Arashi Single Collection 1999–2001	Released: May 16, 2002; Label: J Storm; Format: CD	4	—	—	—	—	—	156,260	
5x5 The Best Selection of 2002–2004	Released: November 10, 2004; Label: J Storm; Format: CD, CD+DVD	1	—	—	—	—	—	190,799	RIAJ: Gold
All the Best! 1999–2009	Released: August 19, 2009; Label: J Storm; Format: CD	1	15	—	40	2	1	1,988,718	RIAJ: Million
Ura Ara Mania (Note: Sales of Ura Ara Mania did not count towards Oricon charts. This compilation album was only available for a limited time and was exclusive to residents in Japan.)	Released: September 20, 2012; Label: J Storm; Format: CD	—	—	—	—	—	—		
5x20 All the Best! 1999–2019	Released: June 26, 2019; Label: J Storm; Format: CD, CD+DVD, digital download	1	1	15	—N/a	—N/a	1	2,194,025	RIAJ: 2× Million
Ura Ara Best 1999–2007	Released: July 16, 2021; Label: J Storm; Format: Digital download	— (Note: Sales of Ura Ara Best albums were considered for the Oricon weekly digital release chart. For the July 21 chart, this album charted in 1st place, with 12,756 downloads; along with the three other Ura Ara Best albums and the 5×20 special edition topping the chart, it was the first time Arashi held the entire top five of the chart.)	6	—	—N/a	—N/a	—	18,069	
Ura Ara Best 2008–2011	Released: July 16, 2021; Label: J Storm; Format: Digital download	— (Note: Sales of Ura Ara Best albums were considered for the Oricon weekly digital release chart. For the July 21 chart, this album charted in 3rd place (11,949 downloads).)	9	—	—N/a	—N/a	—	17,057	
Ura Ara Best 2012–2015	Released: July 16, 2021; Label: J Storm; Format: Digital download	— (Note: Sales of Ura Ara Best albums were considered for the Oricon weekly digital release chart. For the July 21 chart, this album charted in 4th place (11,500 downloads).)	10	—	—N/a	—N/a	—	16,806	
Ura Ara Best 2016–2020	Released: July 16, 2021; Label: J Storm; Format: Digital download	— (Note: Sales of Ura Ara Best albums were considered for the Oricon weekly digital release chart. For the July 21 chart, this album charted in 2nd place (12,708 downloads).)	8	—	—N/a	—N/a	—	18,864	
"—" denotes items which were not released in that country or failed to chart.

== Soundtracks ==
Title	Soundtrack details	Peak chart positions
Title	Soundtrack details	JPN
The Original Motion Picture Soundtrack: Pikanchi Life Is Hard Dakedo Happy (Note: Arashi provided the vocals to the song "Michi" (道; "Path"))	Released: October 30, 2002; Label: J Storm; Format: CD	—
Kiiroi Namida Original Soundtrack (Note: Arashi provided the vocals to the songs "Modori Ame" (もどり雨; "Return Rain") and "Namida no Nagareboshi" (涙の流れ星; "Tear's Meteor").)	Released: April 4, 2007; Label: J Storm; Format: CD	10

== Extended plays ==
Title	EP details	Peak chart positions
Title	EP details	JPN Comb.
Arashi Reborn Vol.1	Released: February 28, 2020; Label: J Storm; Format: Digital download	3

== Singles ==
=== 2000s ===
Title	Year	Peak chart positions				Sales	Certifications	Album
Title	Year	JPN	JPN Hot (Note: The Billboard Japan Hot 100 chart was established in February 2008.) (Note: Sources for chart positions are as follows: "Arashi", "Kansha Kangeki Ame Arashi", "Kotoba Yori Taisetsu na Mono", "Sakura Sake", "Wish", "Love So Sweet", "Happiness", "Step and Go", "One Love", "Truth/Kaze no Mukō e", "Beautiful Days", "Believe/Kumorinochi, Kaisei" "Ashita no Kioku/Crazy Moon (Kimi wa Muteki)" "Everything" "My Girl".)	TWN	TWN East Asia (Note: Positions were taken from 2008 weeks 27 and 34, 2009 weeks 24, 29 and 48, 2010 weeks 13, 23, 34, 39 and 48, 2011 weeks 11 and 47, 2012 weeks 12, 21 and 25, 2013 weeks 12, 2014 weeks 10, 20, 24. "Ai o Sakebe", 2015 week 39.)	Sales	Certifications	Album
"Arashi"	1999	1	21	—	—	973,310	RIAJ: 2× Platinum; RIAJ: Platinum (st.)	Arashi No.1 Ichigou: Arashi wa Arashi o Yobu!
"Sunrise Nippon"	2000	1	—	—	—	405,680	RIAJ: Platinum	Arashi No.1 Ichigou: Arashi wa Arashi o Yobu!
"Horizon"	2000	1	—	—	—	405,680	RIAJ: Platinum	Arashi Single Collection 1999–2001
"Typhoon Generation"	2000	3	—	—	—	361,100	RIAJ: Platinum	Arashi No.1 Ichigou: Arashi wa Arashi o Yobu!
"Kansha Kangeki Ame Arashi"	2000	2	27	—	—	362,490	RIAJ: Platinum; RIAJ: Gold (st.)	Arashi No.1 Ichigou: Arashi wa Arashi o Yobu!
"Kimi no Tame ni Boku ga Iru"	2001	1	—	—	—	323,020	RIAJ: Gold	Arashi Single Collection 1999–2001
"Jidai"	2001	1	—	—	—	354,460	RIAJ: Platinum	Arashi Single Collection 1999–2001
"A Day in Our Life"	2002	1	—	—	—	378,050	RIAJ: Platinum	Here We Go!
"Nice na Kokoroiki"	2002	1	—	—	—	246,469	RIAJ: Gold	Here We Go!
"Pikanchi"	2002	1	—	—	—	185,775		How's It Going?
"Tomadoi Nagara"	2003	2	—	—	—	175,693	RIAJ: Gold	How's It Going?
"Hadashi no Mirai"	2003	2	—	—	—	222,687	RIAJ: Platinum	Iza, Now!
"Kotoba Yori Taisetsu na Mono"	2003	2	85	—	—	222,687	RIAJ: Platinum; RIAJ: Gold (st.)	Iza, Now!
"Pikanchi Double"	2004	1	—	—	—	136,603	RIAJ: Gold	Iza, Now!
"Hitomi no Naka no Galaxy"	2004	1	—	—	—	256,187	RIAJ: Platinum	5x5 The Best Selection of 2002–2004
"Hero"	2004	1	—	—	—	256,187	RIAJ: Platinum	5x5 The Best Selection of 2002–2004
"Sakura Sake"	2005	1	54	—	—	173,623	RIAJ: Gold; RIAJ: Platinum (st.)	One
"Wish"	2005	1	84	—	—	309,064	RIAJ: Platinum; RIAJ: Gold (st.)	Arashic
"Kitto Daijōbu"	2006	1	—	—	—	204,496	RIAJ: Gold	Arashic
"Aozora Pedal"	2006	1	—	—	13	189,428	RIAJ: Platinum	Time
"Love So Sweet"	2007	1	11	—	—	457,162	RIAJ: 2× Platinum; RIAJ: 2× Platinum (st.)	Time
"We Can Make It!"	2007	1	—	—	—	204,775	RIAJ: Gold	Time
"Happiness"	2007	1	22	—	—	292,586	RIAJ: Platinum; RIAJ: Platinum (st.)	Dream "A" Live
"Step and Go"	2008	1	1	—	—	374,449	RIAJ: Platinum	Dream "A" Live
"One Love"	2008	1	1	20	3	564,403	RIAJ: 2× Platinum; RIAJ: Platinum (st.)	All the Best! 1999–2009
"Truth"	2008	1	1	6	1	659,061	RIAJ: 2× Platinum; RIAJ: Gold (st.)	All the Best! 1999–2009
"Kaze no Mukō e"	2008	1	69	6	1	659,061	RIAJ: 2× Platinum; RIAJ: Gold (st.)	All the Best! 1999–2009
"Beautiful Days"	2008	1	1	6	1	472,171	RIAJ: 2× Platinum	All the Best! 1999–2009
"Believe"	2009	1	1	2	2	661,851	RIAJ: 2× Platinum	All the Best! 1999–2009
"Kumorinochi, Kaisei"	2009	1	2	2	2	661,851	RIAJ: 2× Platinum	Non-album single
"Ashita no Kioku"	2009	1	1	4	1	622,011	RIAJ: 2× Platinum	All the Best! 1999–2009
"Crazy Moon (Kimi wa Muteki)"	2009	1	2	4	1	622,011	RIAJ: 2× Platinum	All the Best! 1999–2009
"Everything"	2009	1	1	11	2	432,279	RIAJ: Platinum	Boku no Miteiru Fūkei
"My Girl"	2009	1	1	8	1	560,507	RIAJ: 2× Platinum	Boku no Miteiru Fūkei
"—" denotes items which were not released in that country or failed to chart.

=== 2010s ===
Title	Year	Peak chart positions						Sales	Certifications	Album
Title	Year	JPN	JPN Hot (Note: Sources for chart positions are as follows: "Troublemaker", "Monster", "To Be Free", "Love Rainbow", "Dear Snow", "Hatenai Sora", "Lotus", "Meikyū Love Song", "Wild at Heart", "Face Down", "Your Eyes", "Calling/Breathless", "Endless Game", "Bittersweet", "Guts!", "Daremo Shiranai", "Sakura", "Aozora no Shita, Kimi no Tonari", "Ai o Sakebe", "Fukkatsu Love", "I seek/Daylight", "Power of the Paradise", "I'll be there", "Tsunagu", "Doors (Yūki no Kiseki)", "Find the Answer", "Natsu Hayate", "Kimi no Uta", "Brave", "Turning Up".)	KOR (Note: Sources for chart positions are as follows: "Troublemaker", "Monster", "To Be Free", "Love Rainbow", "Dear Snow", "Hatenai Sora" "Lotus", "Meikyū Love Song", "Wild At Heart", "Face Down", "Your Eyes", "Calling/Breathless", "Endless Game", "Bittersweet", "Guts!", "Daremo Shiranai", "Sakura", "Aozora no Shita, Kimi no Tonari", "Ai o Sakebe", "Fukkatsu Love", "I seek/Daylight", "Power of the Paradise", "I'll Be There", "Tsunagu", "Doors (Yūki no Kiseki)", "Find the Answer", "Natsu Hayate", "Kimi no Uta", "Brave".)	KOR Int. (Note: Sources for chart positions are as follows: "Troublemaker", "Monster", "To Be Free", "Love Rainbow", "Dear Snow", "Hatenai Sora", "Lotus", "Meikyū Love Song", "Wild at Heart", "Face Down", "Your Eyes", "Calling/Breathless", "Endless Game", "Bittersweet", "Guts", "Daremo Shiranai", "Sakura", "Aozora no Shita, Kimi no Tonari", "Ai o Sakebe", "Fukkatsu Love", "I seek/Daylight", "Power of the Paradise", "I'll be there", "Tsunagu", "Doors (Yūki no Kiseki)", "Find the Answer" "Natsu Hayate", "Kimi no Uta".)	TWN	TWN East Asia	Sales	Certifications	Album
"Troublemaker"	2010	1	1	7	2	4	2	701,686	RIAJ: 2× Platinum; RIAJ: Gold (st.)	Boku no Miteiru Fūkei
"Monster"	2010	1	1	12	2	11	3	707,197	RIAJ: 2× Platinum; RIAJ: Platinum (st.)	Boku no Miteiru Fūkei
"To Be Free"	2010	1	1	19	4	9	3	519,781	RIAJ: 2× Platinum	Beautiful World
"Love Rainbow"	2010	1	1	30	3	16	4	627,523	RIAJ: 2× Platinum	Beautiful World
"Dear Snow"	2010	1	1	38	4	—	—	598,790	RIAJ: 2× Platinum	Beautiful World
"Hatenai Sora"	2010	1	1	35	13	8	1	693,869	RIAJ: 2× Platinum	Beautiful World
"Lotus"	2011	1	1	29	6	11	1	625,935	RIAJ: 2× Platinum	Beautiful World
"Meikyū Love Song"	2011	1	1	20	5	15	3	647,391	RIAJ: 2× Platinum	Popcorn
"Wild at Heart"	2012	1	1	14	2	7	4	649,881	RIAJ: 2× Platinum; RIAJ: Gold (st.)	Popcorn
"Face Down"	2012	1	1	36	7	9	3	619,940	RIAJ: 2× Platinum	Popcorn
"Your Eyes"	2012	1	1	35	10	14	1	559,412	RIAJ: 2× Platinum	Popcorn
"Calling"	2013	1	1	20	5	3	2	881,192	RIAJ: 3× Platinum	Love
"Breathless"	2013	1	2	20	5	3	2	881,192	RIAJ: 3× Platinum	Love
"Endless Game"	2013	1	1	25	5	—	—	557,794	RIAJ: 2× Platinum	Love
"Bittersweet"	2014	1	1	35	12	18	3	591,847	RIAJ: 2× Platinum	The Digitalian
"Guts!"	2014	1	1	57	12	7	1	609,184	RIAJ: 2× Platinum; RIAJ: Platinum (st.)	The Digitalian
"Daremo Shiranai"	2014	1	1	48	13	14	3	525,055	RIAJ: 2× Platinum	The Digitalian
"Sakura"	2015	1	1	66	16	—N/a	1	521,067	RIAJ: 2× Platinum	Japonism
"Aozora no Shita, Kimi no Tonari"	2015	1	1	56	11	—N/a	1	571,597	RIAJ: 2× Platinum	Japonism
"Ai o Sakebe"	2015	1	1	62	19	—N/a	2	530,330	RIAJ: 2× Platinum	Are You Happy?
"Fukkatsu Love"	2016	1	1	77	17	—N/a	4	534,954	RIAJ: 2× Platinum	Are You Happy?
"I Seek"	2016	1	1	68	8	—N/a	1	829,305	RIAJ: 3× Platinum	Are You Happy?
"Daylight"	2016	1	21	68	8	—N/a	1	829,305	RIAJ: 3× Platinum	Are You Happy?
"Power of the Paradise"	2016	1	1	76	7	—N/a	—	475,880	RIAJ: 2× Platinum	Untitled
"I'll Be There"	2017	1	1	66	6	—N/a	—	438,613	RIAJ: 2× Platinum	Untitled
"Tsunagu"	2017	1	1	75	8	—N/a	—	434,893	RIAJ: Platinum	Untitled
"Doors (Yūki no Kiseki)"	2017	1	1	58	1	—N/a	—	640,605	RIAJ: 2× Platinum	5x20 All the Best!! 1999–2019
"Find the Answer"	2018	1	1	45	1	—N/a	—	440,307	RIAJ: Platinum	5x20 All the Best!! 1999–2019
"Natsu Hayate"	2018	1	1	46	2	—N/a	—	541,491	RIAJ: 2× Platinum	5x20 All the Best!! 1999–2019
"Kimi no Uta"	2018	1	1	43	3	—N/a	1	428,748	RIAJ: Platinum	5x20 All the Best!! 1999–2019
"Brave"	2019	1	2	55	—N/a	—N/a	1	713,159	RIAJ: 3× Platinum	This Is Arashi
"Turning Up"	2019	— (Note: Having been released only in digital format, "Turning Up" did not enter the Oricon Singles Chart, but peaked at number 1 on the Oricon Digital Singles Chart.)	2	—	—N/a	—N/a	—	130,071	RIAJ: Platinum (st.)	This Is Arashi
"—" denotes items which were not released in that country or failed to chart.

=== 2020s ===
Title	Year	Peak chart positions						Sales	Certifications	Album
Title	Year	JPN	JPN Comb.	JPN Hot	TWN East Asia	US World	WW	Sales	Certifications	Album
"In the Summer"	2020	— (Note: Having been released only in digital format, "In the Summer" did not enter the Oricon Singles Chart, but peaked at number 1 on the Oricon Digital Singles Chart.)	7	5	—	23	—			This Is Arashi
"Kite"	2020	1	1	1	1	—	— (Note: "Kite" did not enter the Billboard Global 200, but peaked at number 151 on the Billboard Global Excl. U.S..)	JPN: 1,167,366 (CD); JPN: 151,921 (DL)	RIAJ: Million; RIAJ: Platinum (st.)	This Is Arashi
"Whenever You Call"	2020	— (Note: Having been released only in digital format, "Whenever You Call" did not enter the Oricon Singles Chart, but peaked at number 1 on the Oricon Digital Singles Chart.)	4	6	—	10	51	JPN: 94,289 (DL)		This Is Arashi
"Party Starters"	2020	— (Note: Having been released only in digital format, "Party Starters" did not enter the Oricon Singles Chart, but peaked at number 2 on the Oricon Digital Singles Chart.)	7	7	—	—	145			This Is Arashi
"Five"	2026	— (Note: Having only been released digitally thus far, "Five" did not enter the Oricon Singles Chart, but peaked at number 1 on the Oricon Digital Singles Chart.)	2	1	—	10	38		RIAJ: Platinum (st.)	Non-album single
"—" denotes items which were not released in that country or failed to chart.

=== As featured artist ===
Title	Year	Peak chart positions			Sales	Certifications
Title	Year	JPN	JPN Comb.	JPN Hot	Sales	Certifications
"Smile" (as a part of Twenty Twenty)	2020	1	1	1	JPN: 510,102 (CD); JPN: 90,762 (DL)	RIAJ: 2× Platinum

== Promotional singles ==
Title	Year	Peak chart positions		Sales	Album
Title	Year	JPN Dig.	JPN Hot	Sales	Album
"A-ra-shi: Reborn"	2019	1	2	110,234	Arashi Reborn Vol.1; This Is Arashi
"Turning Up" (R3hab Remix)	2020	2	14		This Is Arashi
"Love So Sweet: Reborn"	2020	2	6		This Is Arashi
"Face Down: Reborn"	2020	2	11		This Is Arashi

== Other charted songs ==
Title	Year	Peak chart positions	Album
Title	Year	JPN Hot	Album
"Fight Song"	2007	39	Ura Ara Mania
"Move Your Body"	2008	36	Dream "A" Live
"5×10"	2009	39	All the Best! 1999–2009
"Yurase, Ima o"	2010	47	Ura Ara Mania
"Summer Splash"	2010	73	Boku no Miteiru Fūkei
"Mada Minu Sekai e"	2011	90	Beautiful World
"Welcome to Our Party"	2012	43	Popcorn
"Road to Glory"	2014	48	Ura Ara Best 2012–2015
"Zero-G"	2014	41	The Digitalian
"Kokoro no Sora"	2015	26	Japonism
"Don't You Get It"	2016	26	Are You Happy?
"Mikan"	2017	24	Untitled
"5x20"	2019	46	5x20 All the Best!! 1999–2019

== Videography ==
=== Concert videos ===
Title	Video details	Peak chart positions		Sales	Certifications
Title	Video details	JPN	TWN	Sales	Certifications
Suppin Arashi	Released: June 28, 2000; Label: Pony Canyon; Format: VHS	—	—		
All or Nothing	Released: June 12, 2002; Label: J Storm; Format: VHS, DVD	1	—		
How's it going? Summer Concert 2003	Released: December 17, 2003; Label: J Storm/Storm Labels; Format: VHS, DVD, Blu-ray	5	—	186,659	RIAJ: Gold
2004 Arashi! Iza, Now Tour!!	Released: January 1, 2005; Label: J Storm, Storm Labels; Format: VHS, DVD, Blu-ray	3	—	240,392	RIAJ: Gold
Arashi Around Asia Thailand-Taiwan-Korea	Released: May 23, 2007; Label: J Storm/Storm Labels; Format: DVD, Blu-ray	1	—	183,784	RIAJ: Gold
Arashi Around Asia+ in Dome	Released: October 17, 2007; Label: J Storm/Storm Labels; Format: DVD, Blu-ray	2	2	305,909	RIAJ: Platinum
Summer Tour 2007 Final Time: Kotoba no Chikara	Released: April 16, 2008; Label: J Storm/Storm Labels; Format: DVD, Blu-ray	1	1	440,132	RIAJ: Double Platinum
Arashi Around Asia 2008 in Tokyo	Released: March 25, 2009; Label: J Storm/Storm Labels; Format: DVD, Blu-ray	1	2	540,835	RIAJ: Double Platinum
Arashi Anniversary Tour 5×10 (Note: Arashi Anniversary Tour 5x10 ranked number one on the Oricon weekly DVD charts selling about 477,000 copies in the first week. According to Oricon, Arashi Anniversary Tour 5x10 has the highest first week music DVD sales as of April 2010, overtaking the first week sales of Arashi's own 5x10 All the Best! Clips 1999–2009 DVD of 428,000 copies. The DVD maintained its number one position in its second week, selling up to a total of 564,000 copies in two weeks. As of June 2010, the DVD has sold an estimate of 682,000 copies overall. According to Oricon, Arashi Anniversary Tour 5x10 is the best-selling music DVD of 2010 in Japan, selling a total of 786,303 copies.)	Released: April 7, 2010; Label: J Storm/Storm Labels; Format: DVD, Blu-ray	1	1	924,537	RIAJ: 3× Platinum
Arashi 10–11 Tour "Scene": Kimi to Boku no Miteiru Fūkei – Stadium	Released: January 26, 2011; Label: J Storm/Storm Labels; Format: DVD, Blu-ray	1	1	808,972	RIAJ: 3× Platinum
Arashi 10–11 Tour "Scene": Kimi to Boku no Miteiru Fūkei – Dome+	Released: June 15, 2011; Label: J Storm/Storm Labels; Format: DVD, Blu-ray	1	1	708,132	RIAJ: 2× Platinum
Arashi Live Tour Beautiful World	Released: May 23, 2012; Label: J Storm/Storm Labels; Format: DVD, Blu-ray	1	1	717,132	RIAJ: 2× Platinum
Arashi Arafes National Stadium 2012	Released: December 26, 2012; Label: J Storm/Storm Labels; Format: DVD, Blu-ray	1	1	836,010	RIAJ: 3× Platinum
Arashi Live Tour Popcorn	Released: April 24, 2013; Label: J Storm/Storm Labels; Format: DVD, Blu-ray	1	—	751,585	RIAJ: 2× Platinum
Arashi Arafes'13 National Stadium 2013	Released: May 21, 2014; Label: J Storm; Format: DVD, Blu-ray	1	1	720,517	RIAJ: 3× Platinum
Arashi Live Tour 2013 "Love"	Released: July 30, 2014; Label: J Storm; Format: DVD, Blu-ray	1	—	647,105	RIAJ: 2× Platinum
Arashi Blast in Hawaii	Released: April 15, 2015; Label: J Storm; Format: DVD, Blu-ray	1	—	670,330	RIAJ: 2× Platinum
Arashi Live Tour 2014 The Digitalian	Released: July 29, 2015; Label: J Storm; Format: DVD, Blu-ray	1	—	645,840	RIAJ: 2× Platinum
Arashi Blast in Miyagi	Released: January 1, 2016; Label: J Storm; Format: DVD, Blu-ray	1	—	553,633	RIAJ: 2× Platinum
Arashi Live Tour 2015 Japonism	Released: August 24, 2016; Label: J Storm; Format: DVD, Blu-ray	1	—	639,734	RIAJ: 2× Platinum
Arashi Live Tour 2016–2017 Are You Happy?	Released: May 31, 2017; Label: J Storm; Format: DVD, Blu-ray	1	—	762,575	RIAJ: 3× Platinum
Arashi Live Tour 2017–2018 「untitled」	Released: June 13, 2018; Label: J Storm; Format: DVD, Blu-ray	1	—	735,000	RIAJ: 3× Platinum
Arashi Anniversary Tour 5×20	Released: September 30, 2020; Label: J Storm; Format: DVD, Blu-ray	1	—	1,073,982	RIAJ: Million
Arafes 2020 at National Stadium	Released: July 28, 2021; Label: J Storm; Format: DVD, Blu-ray	1	—	784,360	RIAJ: 3× Platinum
This is Arashi Live 2020.12.31	Released: December 29, 2021; Label: J Storm; Format: DVD, Blu-ray	1	—	743,963	RIAJ: 3× Platinum
Arashi Anniversary Tour 5×20 Film: Record of Memories	Released: September 15, 2022; Label: J Storm/Storm Labels; Format: Blu-ray, Ultra 4K Blu-ray	— (Note: Arashi Anniversary Tour 5×20 Film: Record of Memories was not released in DVD format, but topped the Oricon Blu-ray chart.)	—	391,205	
ARASHI LIVE TOUR 2026 "We are ARASHI"	Released: November 3, 2026; Label: Storm Labels; Format: Blu-ray, DVD (regular and fan club exclusive editions)				
"—" denotes items which were not released in that country or failed to chart.

=== Music video collections ===
Title	Album details	Peak chart positions		Sales	Certifications
Title	Album details	JPN	TWN	Sales	Certifications
5x10 All the Best! Clips 1999–2009	Released: October 28, 2009; Label: J Storm; Format: DVD	1	2	900,008	RIAJ: 3× Platinum
5x20 All the Best! Clips 1999–2019	Released: October 16, 2019; Label: J Storm; Format: DVD, Blu-ray	1	—N/a	849,263	RIAJ: 3× Platinum

=== Music videos ===
Title	Year	Director(s)	Ref.
"Arashi"	1999	Kensuke Kawamura	
"Sunrise Nippon"	2000	Kensuke Kawamura	
"Typhoon Generation"	2000	Tetsurō Takeuchi	
"Kansha Kangeki Ame Arashi"	2000	Yō Ōhashi	
"Kimi no Tame ni Boku ga Iru"	2001	Yasuyuki Yamaguchi	
"Jidai"	2001	Takamasa Takimoto	
"A Day in Our Life"	2002	Kensuke Kawamura	
"Nice na Kokoroiki"	2002	Kensuke Kawamura	
"Pikanchi"	2002	Yukihiko Tsutsumi	
"All or Nothing"	2002	Tetsuya Satō	
"Tomadoi Nagara"	2003	Tetsuo Inoue	
"Hadashi no Mirai"	2003	Tetsuya Satō	
"Kotoba Yori Taisetsu na Mono"	2003	Tetsuya Satō	
"Lucky Man"	2004	Kensuke Kawamura	
"Pikanchi Double"	2004	Tetsuya Satō	
"Hitomi no Naka no Galaxy"	2004	Akihisa Takagi	
"Hero"	2004	Akihisa Takagi	
"Sakura Sake"	2005	Hideaki Sunaga	
"Wish"	2005	Choku	
"Kitto Daijōbu"	2006	Yasuhiko Shimizu	
"Aozora Pedal"	2006	Choku	
"Love So Sweet"	2007	Yasuyuki Yamaguchi	
"We Can Make It!"	2007	Hideaki Fukui	
"Happiness"	2007	Choku	
"Step and Go"	2008	Kensuke Kawamura	
"One Love"	2008	Hideaki Fukui, Sorairo	
"Truth"	2008	Hideaki Sunaga	
"Kaze no Mukō e"	2008	Hideaki Sunaga	
"Beautiful Days"	2008	Tarō Okagawa	
"Believe"	2009	Hideaki Sunaga	
"Believe" (Animated version) (Note: A collaboration between Tatsunoko Production and J Storm. A short version was released on dwango.jp on March 4, 2009. The full-length version of the animated short was included in the group's music video collection 5x10 All the Best! Clips 1999–2009, which was released by J Storm on October 28, 2009.)	2009	Tatsunoko Production	
"Ashita no Kioku"	2009	Daisuke Shimada	
"Crazy Moon (Kimi wa Muteki)"	2009	Hideaki Sunaga	
"Everything"	2009	Choku	
"My Girl"	2009	Yasuyuki Yamaguchi	
"Troublemaker"	2010	Shoichi “David” Haruyama	
"Monster"	2010	Hideaki Sunaga	
"To Be Free"	2010	Tarō Okagawa	
"Love Rainbow"	2010	Hideaki Sunaga	
"Dear Snow"	2010	Choku	
"Hatenai Sora"	2010	Yōki Watanabe	
"Lotus"	2011		
"Mada Minu Sekai e"	2011	Kensuke Kawamura	
"Meikyū Love Song"	2011		
"Wild at Heart"	2012	Kensuke Kawamura	
"Face Down"	2012	Kensuke Kawamura	
"Your Eyes"	2012	Hideaki Sunaga	
"Calling"	2013	Kensuke Kawamura	
"Breathless"	2013	Hideaki Sunaga	
"Endless Game"	2013	Kensuke Kawamura	
"P・A・R・A・D・O・X"	2013	Shūichi Banba	
"Bittersweet"	2014		
"Guts!"	2014	Choku	
"Daremo Shiranai"	2014	Kensuke Kawamura	
"Zero-G"	2014		
"Sakura"	2015		
"Aozora no Shita, Kimi no Tonari"	2015		
"Ai o Sakebe"	2015	Kensuke Kawamura	
"Kokoro no Sora"	2015		
"Fukkatsu Love"	2016		
"I Seek"	2016		
"Daylight"	2016	Takuya Tada	
"Power of the Paradise"	2016		
"Don't You Get It?"	2016	Ukon Kamimura	
"I'll Be There"	2017		
"Tsunagu"	2017		
"Mikan"	2017	Kento Yamada	
"Doors (Yūki no Kiseki)"	2017		
"Now or Never"	2017		
"Find the Answer"	2018		
"Natsu Hayate"	2018		
"Kimi no Uta"	2018		
"5x20"	2019		
"Brave"	2019	Hideaki Sunaga	
"Turning Up"	2019	Nev Todorovic	
"A-ra-shi: Reborn" (Note: Collaboration with One Piece.)	2020		
"Turning Up (R3hab Remix)" (Note: Collaboration with R3hab.)	2020		
"In the Summer"	2020	Ukon Kamimura	
"Kite"	2020	Kazuaki Seki	
"Whenever You Call"	2020	Hideaki Sunaga	
"Party Starters"	2020	Ukyo Inaba	
"Do You...?"	2020	Kensuke Kawamura	
