= 5x20 All the Best!! 1999–2019 =

Greatest hits album by Arashi
- Released: June 26, 2019
- Recorded: 1999–2019
- Language: Japanese
- Label: J Storm

Arashi chronology
Untitled (2017)	5x20 All the Best!! 1999–2019 (2019)	Arashi Reborn Vol.1 (2020)

Singles from 5x20 All the Best!! 1999–2019
- 1. "Doors (Yūki no Kiseki)" Released: November 8, 2017; 2. "Find the Answer" Released: February 21, 2018; 3. "Natsu Hayate" Released: July 25, 2018; 4. "Kimi no Uta" Released: October 24, 2018

5x20 All the Best!! 1999–2019 (stylized as 5×20 All the BEST!! 1999–2019) is the fifth greatest hits album by Japanese boy band Arashi. It was released through J Storm on June 26, 2019. The album debuted at the top spot of the Oricon Weekly Albums chart, selling 1,304,251 copies in its first week of release in Japan. It spent the most weeks at number one of any album on the Oricon Albums Chart in 2019, with four, and was both the best-selling album of 2019 in Japan, as well as worldwide, with 3.3 million copies sold, eventually becoming the world's best-selling album of the year for 2019.

== Background ==
5x20 All the Best!! 1999–2019 is Arashi's fifth greatest hits album, following Arashi Single Collection 1999–2001 (2002), 5x5 The Best Selection of 2002–2004 (2004), All the Best! 1999–2009 (2009), and Ura Ara Mania (2012). It contains all 56 singles released by the band between 1999 and 2018, plus a new song, "5x20". Included in a limited edition is a live video collection spanning the band's career.

On January 27, 2019, the band announced that it would cease all group activities after December 31, 2020. In a press conference on the same day, member Jun Matsumoto expressed interest in releasing a 20th anniversary best-of album and a video collection. Arashi announced the album on May 3, 2019, via Yomiuri Shimbun.

== Release and promotion ==
The album was released on June 26, 2019, in three editions: a four-disc CD regular edition, and two 4CD/1DVD limited editions. Limited edition 1 contains a DVD with the music video and making-of for "5x20". Limited edition 2 contains a DVD called "Arashi Live Clips", which contains selected video clips from previously released live concert videos.

Pre-orders became available on May 8. By May 29, the majority of CD shops and online stores had sold out of its allocation of pre-orders and it was discovered that the album was being resold for higher than its suggested retail price. In response, J Storm arranged for additional production of the limited editions, available for pre-order from June 1 to July 12, to be shipped mid-August.

Arashi appeared on NHK's Songs, TV Tokyo's TV Tokyo Music Festival, TBS's Ongaku no Hi NTV's The Music Day, and Fuji TV's FNS Music Fes. in Summer.

On July 1, 2021, member Kazunari Ninomiya appeared on video on their SNS promoting the digital release of the album as a special version. It would include all the songs previously released in physical form, plus 3 additional songs. The album is to be released on July 16, 2021, with pre-orders starting on July 2.

=== Tour ===
Arashi embarked on their 20th anniversary tour in November 2018. The tour began in Sapporo on November 16, 2018, at the Sapporo Dome, before moving throughout Japan. On December 23, Arashi announced an additional 32 dates to the tour, bringing the total scheduled shows to 50. The tour concluded in Tokyo on December 25, 2019. It was expected to draw 2.375 million total concert attendees.

== Commercial performance ==
5x20 All the Best!! 1999–2009 sold 729,000 copies on its first day of release, breaking the record for the highest first-day sales by a male artist. The previous record was held by the Arashi's 2015 album Japonism, which sold 413,000 copies on its first day. On its second day, the album sold 267,000 copies, bringing its two-day sales total to 996,000. It sold 103,000 copies on its third day, which brought the album's total sales to 1.099 million, making it the first million-seller of the Reiwa era.

According to Billboard Japan, the album sold 740,114 copies from June 24–25, 2019, which set the record for the highest first-week sales in 2019. Billboard Japan reported that it sold 1,037,689 copies from June 24–26, 2019.

The album topped the Oricon Monthly Chart for three consecutive months, selling 1,304,251 copies in the album's release and selling over 278,870 copies in its second month of release. In its third month of release, the album sold over 411,854 copies.

On September 10, the album was certified 2× Million by the RIAJ, indicating sales of more than two million copies. The album was the first album to reach 2× Million certification in the Reiwa era.

The album was also distributed in various countries such as South Korea, where it reached number 15 on the weekly Gaon Album Chart.

According to the IFPI, 5x20 was the best-selling album of 2019 worldwide, with 3.3 million copies sold, eventually became the world's best-selling album of the year for 2019.

After only days of its digital release, the special edition ranked in 5th place with 4,015 downloads on the Oricon Weekly Digital Download chart, together with the four versions of the Ura Ara Best albums, making it the first time Arashi held the top five spots.

== Track listing ==
CD 1
No.	Title	Original album	Length
1.	"Arashi"	Arashi No.1 Ichigou: Arashi wa Arashi o Yobu!	4:29
2.	"Sunrise Nippon"	Arashi No.1 Ichigou: Arashi wa Arashi o Yobu!	4:45
3.	"Horizon"	Arashi Single Collection 1999–2001	5:09
4.	"Typhoon Generation"	Arashi No.1 Ichigou: Arashi wa Arashi o Yobu!	5:01
5.	"Kansha Kangeki Ame Arashi"	Arashi No.1 Ichigou: Arashi wa Arashi o Yobu!	4:49
6.	"Kimi no Tame ni Boku ga Iru"	Arashi Single Collection 1999–2001	3:46
7.	"Jidai"	Arashi Single Collection 1999–2001	4:55
8.	"A Day in Our Life"	Here We Go!	4:47
9.	"La Tormenta 2004 (Special edition only)"	5x5 The Best Selection of 2002–2004	4:07
10.	"Nice na Kokoroiki"	Here We Go!	4:01
11.	"Pikanchi"	How's It Going?	4:52
12.	"Tomadoi Nagara"	How's It Going?	4:16
13.	"Hadashi no Mirai"	Iza, Now!	4:43
14.	"Kotoba Yori Taisetsu na Mono"	Iza, Now!	4:03
15.	"Pikanchi Double"	Iza, Now!	5:08
16.	"Hitomi no Naka no Galaxy"	5x5 The Best Selection of 2002–2004	5:20
17.	"Hero"	5x5 The Best Selection of 2002–2004	4:53

CD 2
No.	Title	Original album	Length
1.	"Sakura Sake"	One	4:24
2.	"Wish"	Arashic	4:29
3.	"Kitto Daijōbu"	Arashic	4:53
4.	"Aozora Pedal"	Time	5:21
5.	"Love So Sweet"	Time	4:51
6.	"We Can Make It!"	Time	4:12
7.	"Happiness"	Dream "A" Live	4:20
8.	"Step and Go"	Dream "A" Live	4:47
9.	"One Love"	All the Best! 1999–2009	4:47
10.	"Truth"	All the Best! 1999–2009	4:51
11.	"Kaze no Mukō e"	All the Best! 1999–2009	3:41
12.	"Beautiful Days"	All the Best! 1999–2009	4:54
13.	"Believe"	All the Best! 1999–2009	4:46
14.	"Ashita no Kioku"	All the Best! 1999–2009	5:00
15.	"Crazy Moon (Kimi wa Muteki)"	All the Best! 1999–2009	3:59
16.	"5x10 (Special edition only)"	All the Best! 1999–2009	5:27
17.	"Attack it! (Special edition only)"	All the Best! 1999–2009	2:40
18.	"Everything"	Boku no Miteiru Fūkei	4:00

CD 3
No.	Title	Original album	Length
1.	"My Girl"	Boku no Miteiru Fūkei	4:47
2.	"Troublemaker"	Boku no Miteiru Fūkei	4:03
3.	"Monster"	Boku no Miteiru Fūkei	4:29
4.	"To Be Free"	Beautiful World	3:45
5.	"Love Rainbow"	Beautiful World	4:42
6.	"Dear Snow"	Beautiful World	4:45
7.	"Hatenai Sora"	Beautiful World	4:27
8.	"Lotus"	Beautiful World	4:24
9.	"Meikyū Love Song"	Popcorn	4:38
10.	"Wild at Heart"	Popcorn	4:09
11.	"Face Down"	Popcorn	3:57
12.	"Your Eyes"	Popcorn	4:40
13.	"Calling"	Love	4:01
14.	"Breathless"	Love	4:59
15.	"Endless Game"	Love	3:58
16.	"Bittersweet"	The Digitalian	4:48

CD 4
No.	Title	Original album	Length
1.	"Guts!"	The Digitalian	4:55
2.	"Daremo Shiranai"	The Digitalian	4:04
3.	"Sakura"	Japonism	4:39
4.	"Aozora no Shita, Kimi no Tonari"	Japonism	4:04
5.	"Ai o Sakebe"	Are You Happy?	4:41
6.	"Fukkatsu Love"	Are You Happy?	4:54
7.	"I Seek"	Are You Happy?	4:45
8.	"Daylight"	Are You Happy?	4:51
9.	"Power of the Paradise"	Untitled	4:38
10.	"I'll Be There"	Untitled	4:11
11.	"Tsunagu"	Untitled	4:08
12.	"Doors (Yūki no Kiseki)"		4:11
13.	"Find the Answer"		4:03
14.	"Natsu Hayate"		4:20
15.	"Kimi no Uta"		4:33
16.	"5x20" (Written by Arashi, Sho Sakurai, Youth Case)		6:15

Limited Edition 1 DVD
No.	Title	Length
1.	"5x20" (Music video + making-of)

Limited Edition 2 DVD: Arashi Live Clips
No.	Title	Concert video	Length
1.	"Arashi"	Arashi First Concert 2000
2.	"Tsukarecha DaMedley" ("Koi wa Breakin'", "Yasei o Shiritai", "Dangan-Liner", "Sawarenai")	Arashi All Arena Tour Join the Storm
3.	"Lucky Man"	Arashi Summer Concert 2003 How's It Going?
4.	"Right Back to You"	2004 Arashi! Iza, Now Tour!!
5.	"Yes? No?"	Arashi Live 2005 One Summer Tour
6.	"Cool & Soul"	Arashi First Concert 2006 in Taipei: Jiǔ děng le! Arashi lái le!
7.	"Love So Sweet"	Arashi Around Asia+ in Dome
8.	"Oh Yeah!"	Summer Tour 2007 Final Time – Kotoba no Chikara
9.	"Love Situation"	Summer Tour 2007 Final Time – Kotoba no Chikara
10.	"Re(mark)able"	Arashi Around Asia 2008 in Tokyo
11.	"Truth"	Arashi Around Asia 2008 in Tokyo
12.	"Kansha Kangeki Ame Arashi"	Arashi Anniversary Tour 5x10
13.	"5x10"	Arashi Anniversary Tour 5x10
14.	"Summer Splash!"	Arashi 10–11 Tour "Scene": Kimi to Boku no Miteiru Fūkei
15.	"Monster"	Arashi 10–11 Tour "Scene": Kimi to Boku no Miteiru Fūkei
16.	"Movin' On"	Arashi 10–11 Tour "Scene": Kimi to Boku no Miteiru Fūkei
17.	"Hatenai Sora"	Arashi Live Tour Beautiful World
18.	"Welcome to Our Party"	Arashi Live Tour Popcorn
19.	"Paradox"	Arashi Live Tour 2013 Love
20.	"My Girl" (Hawaiian ver.)	Arashi Blast in Hawaii
21.	"Asterisk"	Arashi Live Tour 2014 The Digitalian
22.	"Carnival Night Part 2" (Festival ver.)	Arashi Blast in Miyagi
23.	"Kokoro no Sora"	Arashi Live Tour 2015 Japonism
24.	"Don't You Get It"	Arashi Live Tour 2016–2017 Are You Happy?
25.	"Green Light"	Arashi Live Tour 2017–2018 Untitled
26.	"Mikan"	Arashi Live Tour 2017–2018 Untitled

== Charts ==
=== Weekly charts ===
Chart (2019)	Peak position
Japanese Albums (Oricon)	1
Japanese Hot Albums (Billboard Japan)	1
South Korean Albums (Gaon)	15

=== Year-end charts ===
Chart (2019)	Position
Japanese Albums (Oricon)	1
Japan Hot Albums (Billboard Japan)	1
Worldwide Albums (IFPI)	1

Chart (2020)	Position
Japanese Albums (Oricon)	67
Japan Hot Albums (Billboard Japan)	51

== Sales and certifications ==
Region	Certification	Certified units/sales
Japan (RIAJ)	2× Million	2,190,988
Japan digital sales	—	8,257
South Korea	—	4,458
Summaries
Worldwide (IFPI)	—	3,300,000 (Note: Global sales (pure albums) by the end of 2019.)

== Release history ==
Region	Date	Format(s)	Label	Ref.
Japan	June 26, 2019	CD; DVD	J Storm	
South Korea	July 24, 2019	CD; DVD	SM Entertainment	
Taiwan	August 23, 2019	CD; DVD	Avex Taiwan	
Various	July 16, 2021	Digital download; streaming	J Storm	
