= 5x10 All the Best! Clips 1999–2009 =

Video by Arashi
- Released: October 28, 2009
- Recorded: 1999–2009
- Genres: Pop, rock
- Length: 238 minutes
- Label: J Storm

Arashi chronology
Arashi Around Asia 2008 in Tokyo (2009)	5x10 All the Best! Clips 1999–2009 (2009)	Arashi Anniversary Tour 5x10 (2010)

5x10 All the Best! Clips 1999–2009 (stylized as 5×10 All the BEST! CLIPS 1999–2009) is the music video collection DVD of Japanese boy band Arashi. The two-disc DVD was released on October 28, 2009, in Japan under their record label J Storm. With the exception of the music videos for "Everything" and "My Girl", the DVD contains all the music videos the group has made since their debut in 1999 to their tenth anniversary in 2009 and the full-length version of the animation film for "Believe".

== DVD information ==
On September 23, 2009, Arashi member Satoshi Ohno confirmed on his radio show Arashi Discovery that Arashi would release the DVD on October 28, 2009. Release as two-disc DVD, it included not only the thirty-one music videos of the group's singles but also special commentary for most of the music videos, the "Lucky Man" music video from 5x5 The Best Selection of 2002–2004, the full-length version of the animation film of "Believe" for which Arashi collaborated with Tatsunoko Production, and the making of the "Crazy Moon (Kimi wa Muteki) & Believe" music video.

== Content ==
=== Disc One ===
1. Opening: "Arashi"
2. "Sunrise Nippon"
3. "Typhoon Generation"
4. "Kansha Kangeki Ame Arashi"
5. "Kimi no Tame ni Boku ga Iru"
6. "Jidai"
7. "A Day in Our Life"
8. "Nice na Kokoroiki"
9. "Pikanchi"
10. "Tomadoi Nagara"
11. "Lucky Man"
12. "Hadashi no Mirai"
13. "Kotoba Yori Taisetsu na Mono"
14. "Pikanchi Double"
15. "Hitomi no Naka no Galaxy"
16. "Hero"
17. "Sakura Sake"
18. "Wish"

=== Disc Two ===
1. Intro: "Kitto Daijōbu"
2. "Aozora Pedal"
3. "Love So Sweet"
4. "We Can Make It!"
5. "Happiness"
6. "Step and Go"
7. "One Love"
8. "Truth"
9. "Kaze no Mukō e"
10. "Beautiful Days"
11. "Believe"
12. "Ashita no Kioku"
13. "Crazy Moon (Kimi wa Muteki)"
14. Animation film of "Believe"

== Commentary ==
- "Arashi": Arashi
- "Sunrise Nippon": Kazunari Ninomiya
- "Typhoon Generation": Sho Sakurai
- "Kansha Kangeki Ame Arashi": Satoshi Ohno
- "Kimi no Tame ni Boku ga Iru": Jun Matsumoto
- "Jidai": Ninomiya
- "A Day in Our Life": Arashi
- "Nice na Kokoroiki": Masaki Aiba
- "Pikanchi": Arashi
- "Tomadoi Nagara": Ninomiya
- "Lucky Man": Arashi
- "Hadashi no Mirai": Sakurai
- "Kotoba Yori Taisetsu na Mono": Matsumoto
- "Pikanchi Double": Ninomiya
- "Hitomi no Naka no Galaxy": Aiba
- "Hero": Matsumoto
- "Sakura Sake": Sakurai
- "Wish": Aiba
- "Kitto Daijōbu": Ohno
- "Aozora Pedal": Ohno
- "Love So Sweet": Matsumoto
- "We Can Make It!": Aiba
- "Happiness": Ohno
- "Step and Go": Arashi
- "One Love": Matsumoto
- "Truth": Ohno
- "Kaze no Mukō e": Aiba
- "Beautiful Days": Ninomiya
- "Believe": Sakurai
- "Ashita no Kioku": Sakurai

== Chart performance ==
In the first week of its release, the DVD debuted at number one on the Oricon weekly music DVD chart by selling over 428,000 copies, holding the record for the highest first-week sales of a music DVD. After another week, the DVD became the first music DVD in Oricon history to exceed 500,000 in sales. On December 18, 2009, Oricon announced that the DVD was the best-selling music DVD of 2009, selling 590,642 copies.

On January 12, 2010, Oricon announced that 5x10 All the Best! Clips 1999—2009 returned to top the music DVD weekly chart after ten weeks due to Arashi's appearance at the 60th NHK Kōhaku Uta Gassen on December 31, 2009. As a result, the DVD holds the record for the longest interval of a music DVD ranking. The previous record was held by Hikaru Utada's Single Clip Collection Vol.1 DVD in 1999 as her DVD returned to the top after a three-week interval. By the end of 2010, Oricon announced that the DVD sold another 228,444 copies, making it the seventh best-selling DVD overall for 2010 in Japan.

== Charts, peaks and certifications ==
=== Charts ===
Chart (2009)	Peak position
Japan Oricon Weekly Music DVD Chart	1
Japan Oricon Weekly Comprehensive DVD Chart	1
Japan Oricon Yearly Music DVD Chart	1
Japan Oricon Yearly Comprehensive DVD Chart	2
Chart (2010)	Peak position
Japan Oricon Weekly Music DVD Chart	1
Japan Oricon Weekly Comprehensive DVD Chart	1
Japan Oricon Yearly Music DVD Chart	3
Japan Oricon Yearly Comprehensive DVD Chart	7

=== Sales and certifications ===
Country	Provider	Sales	Certification
Japan	RIAJ	819,086 (Note: The DVD sold a total of 590,642 copies in 2009 and another 228,444 copies in 2010, bringing the total to 819,086 copies sold overall.)	Double Platinum

== Release history ==
Region	Date	Format	Distributor
Japan	October 28, 2009	2DVD (JABA-5099)	J Storm
South Korea	November 11, 2009	2DVD	SM Entertainment
Taiwan	November 20, 2009	2DVD (JAJDV57025/6)	Avex Taiwan
Hong Kong	November 27, 2009	2DVD	Avex Asia

== Awards ==
=== Japan Gold Disc Awards ===
Year	Nominee / work	Award	Result
2010	5x10 All the Best! Clips 1999–2009	The Best Music Videos	Won
