= All the Best! 1999–2009 =

Greatest hits album by Arashi
- Released: August 19, 2009
- Recorded: 1999–2009
- Genre: Pop, rock
- Length: 194:39 (Limited edition); 151:39 (Regular edition)
- Label: J Storm
- Producer: Johnny H. Kitagawa

Arashi chronology
Dream "A" Live (2008)	All the Best! 1999–2009 (2009)	Boku no Miteiru Fūkei (2010)

Singles from All the Best! 1999–2009
- 1. "One Love" Released: June 25, 2008; 2. "Truth / Kaze no Mukō e" Released: August 20, 2008; 3. "Beautiful Days" Released: November 5, 2008; 4. "Believe / Kumorinochi, Kaisei" Released: March 4, 2009; 5. "Ashita no Kioku / Crazy Moon (Kimi wa Muteki)" Released: May 27, 2009

All the Best! 1999–2009 (stylized as ALL the BEST! 1999–2009) is the third greatest hits album by Japanese pop boy band Arashi. The album was released on August 19, 2009, in Japan under their record label J Storm in two editions, a limited 3CD version and a regular 2CD version. The album debuted at number-one on the Oricon album weekly chart, selling 753,430 copies. Thirteen days after the release of All the Best! 1999–2009 the album sold over a million copies. As of September 22, 2009, All the Best! 1999–2009 had overtaken Supermarket Fantasy to claim the title of best-selling album of the year in Japan. On December 18, 2009, Oricon officially ranked All the Best! 1999–2009 as the best-selling album in Japan for 2009, with over 1.43 million copies sold.

== Album information ==
Both the regular and limited editions contain all of the band's singles from their debut single "Arashi" (1999) to "Ashita no Kioku/Crazy Moon (Kimi wa Muteki)" (2009), with the exception of Satoshi Ohno's solo single. A new song titled "5x10" was included with both editions. The song's lyrics were written by Arashi themselves to express their gratitude for their fans. The regular edition exclusively contains a hidden track titled "Attack It!" while the limited edition exclusively contains a third disc of the band's selections and a premium booklet.

== Critical reception ==
Professional ratings
Review scores
Source	Rating
AllMusic	3.5/5 stars
CDJournal	1/1 star

Ian Martin from AllMusic gave the album three and a half out of five stars, stating that the first disc is "the most fun", the second disc is "seeming to be taking aim at courting a more mature (read: 'bland') image" and the third disc is "a curious collection of tracks that certainly adds variety to the compilation". CDJournal gave the album a star for an exceptional work and praised the members vocal delivery.

== Commercial performance ==
Upon the release of the album, it debuted at number-one on the Oricon daily album chart selling over 261,070 copies. On the weekly album chart the album took the number-one spot selling 753,430 copies. Due to the high opening sales, All the Best! 1999–2009 held the record for the best opening numbers for an album in the year 2009 and is their best-selling album. The album stayed at number-one for two consecutive weeks, selling over 232,800 copies in its second week. Thirteen days after release, All the Best! 1999–2009 passed one million copies sold, making it the first to do so in 2009. After five weeks, the album rose to the top of the Oricon yearly album chart, overtaking Mr. Children's Supermarket Fantasy.

In June 2010, it was reported that the album had sold a total of around 1,600,000 copies. As of August 2010, the album has sold a total of around 1,729,000 copies. As of April 2019, the album has sold a total of around 1,980,000 copies.

== Track listing ==
CD 1
No.	Title	Lyrics	Music	Arrangement	Length
1.	"Arashi" (from Arashi No. 1: Arashi wa Arashi o Yobu!)	J&T	Kōji Makaino	Makaino	4:27
2.	"Sunrise Nippon" (from Arashi No. 1: Arashi wa Arashi o Yobu!)	F&T	Makaino	Chokkaku	4:43
3.	"Horizon" (from Arashi No. 1: Arashi wa Arashi o Yobu!)	Takeshi	Shin Tanimoto	Hitoshi Munakata; Naoki Hayashibe	5:07
4.	"Typhoon Generation" (from Arashi No. 1: Arashi wa Arashi o Yobu!)	Yōji Kubota	Makaino	Naoki Ōtsubo	4:59
5.	"Kansha Kangeki Ame Arashi" (from Arashi No. 1: Arashi wa Arashi o Yobu!)	Masami Tozawa	Makaino	Chokkaku	4:47
6.	"Kimi no Tame ni Boku ga Iru" (from Arashi Single Collection 1999–2001)	Kohei Ōkura	Makaino	Reiko Takano	3:46
7.	"Jidai" (from Arashi Single Collection 1999–2001)	Tsukasa	Tsukasa	Chokkaku	4:54
8.	"A Day in Our Life" (from Here We Go!)	Shun; Shuya	Shun; Shuya	Shun; Shuya	4:45
9.	"Nice na Kokoroiki" (from Here We Go!)	Tozawa	Takehiko Iida	Tomoki Ishizuka	3:59
10.	"Pikanchi" (from How's It Going?)	Takeshi Aida	Tanimoto	Chokkaku	4:51
11.	"Tomadoi Nagara" (from How's It Going?)	Hirō Ōyagi	Ōyagi	Ōyagi	4:14
12.	"Hadashi no Mirai" (from Iza, Now!)	Ayumi Miyazaki	Miyazaki	Chokkaku	4:41
13.	"Kotoba Yori Taisetsu na Mono" (from Iza, Now!)	Takeshi; Sho Sakurai	Iida	Ishizuka	4:03
14.	"Pikanchi Double" (from Iza, Now!)	Spin; Sakurai	Kōsuke Morimoto	Ishizuka	5:06
15.	"Hitomi no Naka no Galaxy" (from 5x5 The Best Selection of 2002–2004)	Fumiya Fujii	Fujii	Chokkaku	5:18
16.	"Hero" (from 5x5 The Best Selection of 2002–2004)	Spin	Tanimoto	Ishizuka	4:53

CD 2
No.	Title	Lyrics	Music	Arrangement	Length
1.	"Sakura Sake" (from One)	Aida; Sakurai	Tanimoto	Ishizuka	4:21
2.	"Wish" (from Arashic)	Kubota	Ōyagi	Chokkaku	4:26
3.	"Kitto Daijōbu" (from Arashic)	Spin; Sakurai	Shinnosuke	Shinnosuke	4:51
4.	"Aozora Pedal" (from Time)	Shikao Suga	Suga	Ishizuka	5:18
5.	"Love So Sweet" (from Time)	Spin	Youth Case	Mugen	4:49
6.	"We Can Make It!" (from Time)	Unite; Sakurai	Fredrik Thomander; Anders Wikström	Masaya Suzuki	4:10
7.	"Happiness" (from Dream "A" Live)	Wonderland	Mio Okada	Gin Kitagawa	4:17
8.	"Step and Go" (from Dream "A" Live)	Wonderland; Sakurai	Youth Case	Taku Yoshioka	4:46
9.	"One Love"	Youth Case	Yūsuke Katō	Ishizuka	4:45
10.	"Truth"	Hydrant	Hydrant	Wataru Maeguchi	4:49
11.	"Kaze no Mukō e"	Shinya Tada; Sakurai	Pippi Svensson; Anders Dannvik	Hans Johnson	3:40
12.	"Beautiful Days"	Takuya Harada	Harada	Ha-j	4:51
13.	"Believe"	100+; Sakurai	100+	Yoshioka	4:45
14.	"Ashita no Kioku"	Yoshitaka Taira	Taira	Hirofumi Sasaki	4:58
15.	"Crazy Moon (Kimi wa Muteki)"	Soluna	Hyper Slipper	Hyper Slipper	4:02
16.	"5x10"	Arashi	Youth Case	Ha-j	8:18 (Note: Regular edition with "Attack It!".); 5:28 (Note: Limited edition without "Attack It!".)
17.	"Attack It!" (Hidden track, regular edition only)				2:45

CD 3: Arashi's Selection
No.	Title	Lyrics	Music	Arrangement	Length
1.	"Cool & Soul" (from Arashic)	Spin; Sakurai	Yoshioka	Yoshioka	3:52
2.	"Yes? No?" (from One)	Ma-saya; Sakurai	Shusui; Stefan Engblom; Axel Belinder	Shusui; Stefan Engblom; Axel Belinder	5:23
3.	"Only Love" (from How's It Going?)	Makoto Atoji	Ashley Cadell; BJ Caruama; John Collins	Ishizuka	4:34
4.	"Natsu no Namae" (夏の名前 "Summer's Name", from One)	Hamai; Sakurai	Katsuyuki Harada	Ha-j; Yoshioka	4:34
5.	"Oh Yeah!" (from Time)	Unite	Kazunari Ohno	Kitagawa	4:44
6.	"Re(mark)able"	R.P.P.; Sakurai	Yoshioka	Yoshioka	4:34
7.	"Boku ga Boku no Subete" (僕が僕のすべて "I Am Everything to Me")	100+	Katō	Katō	4:29
8.	"Still..."	Tada; Sakurai	Tada	Naoki-T	4:18
9.	"Be with You" (from Time)	Masataka Kitaura	Kitaura	Ha-j	5:08
10.	"Subarashiki Sekai" (素晴らしき世界 "Wonderful World", from One)	Kazunari Ohno; Spin; Sakurai	Noriyoshi Matsushita	Ishizuka	4:14

== Charts and certifications ==
=== Weekly charts ===
Weekly chart performance for All the Best! 1999–2009
Chart (2009–2010)	Peak position
Japanese Albums (Oricon)	1
Taiwanese Albums (G-Music)	2
Taiwanese Asian Albums (G-Music)	1
Korean International Albums (Gaon)	40

=== Year-end charts ===
2009 year-end chart performance for All the Best! 1999–2009
Chart (2009)	Position
Japanese Albums (Oricon)	1

2010 year-end chart performance for All the Best! 1999–2009
Chart (2010)	Position
Japanese Albums (Oricon)	19

=== Certifications and sales ===
Certifications and sales for All the Best! 1999–2009
Region	Certification	Certified units/sales
Japan (RIAJ)	Million	1,980,000

== Release history ==
Release history and formats for All the Best! 1999–2009
Country	Date	Label	Format	Catalog
Japan	August 19, 2009	J Storm	2CD	JACA-5202
Japan	August 19, 2009	J Storm	3CD	JACA-5199
Korea	September 2, 2009	SM Entertainment	2CD	SMJTCD317
Korea	September 2, 2009	SM Entertainment	3CD	SMJTCD316
Taiwan	September 4, 2009	Avex Taiwan	2CD	JAJCD26007/8
Taiwan	September 4, 2009	Avex Taiwan	3CD	JAJCD26007/A
Hong Kong	September 10, 2009	Avex Asia	2CD	
Hong Kong	September 10, 2009	Avex Asia	3CD	
