= 5x5 The Best Selection of 2002–2004 =

- Cover to the standard edition of the album

Greatest hits album by Arashi
- Released: November 10, 2004
- Recorded: 2002–2004
- Genre: Pop
- Length: 70:13 (limited edition); 74:21 (regular edition)
- Label: J Storm

Arashi chronology
| Iza, Now! (2004) | 5x5 The Best Selection of 2002–2004 (2004) | One (2004) |

Singles from 5x5 The Best Selection of 2002–2004
- 1. "Hitomi no Naka no Galaxy/Hero" Released: August 18, 2004

5x5 The Best Selection of 2002–2004 (stylized as 5×5 The Best Selection of 2002←2004) is the second compilation album of the Japanese boy band Arashi. As with the group's recent albums, two editions were released. The album contains all of the singles the band released from 2002 to 2004 as well as several album tracks. The regular edition contains a bonus track, while the limited edition contains a booklet and a DVD containing all of the music videos the group has released since 1999.

== Album information ==
The release of the album coincided with the group's fifth anniversary. The limited edition exclusively contains a special music video of Arashi's "Lucky Man" song from their 2003 studio album How's It Going? while the regular edition exclusively contains the song "La Tormenta 2004", which translates into "The Storm 2004" from Spanish to English. "La Tormenta 2004" also serves as an updated version of "La Tormenta 2001" and "La Tormenta Chapter II", which the group performed in their Shounen Club appearance on July 15, 2001 and throughout their 2003 How's It Going? summer concert tour respectively.

== Track list ==
CD
| No. | Title | Lyrics | Music | Arrangement | Length |
|---|---|---|---|---|---|
| 1. | "Hero" | Spin | Shin Tanimoto | Tomoki Ishizuka | 4:54 |
| 2. | "Hitomi no Naka no Galaxy" | Fumiya Fujii | Fujii | Chokkaku | 5:19 |
| 3. | "Tochū Gesha" | Spin | Kōsuke Morimoto | Ha-j | 4:16 |
| 4. | "Right Back to You" | Spin; Sho Sakurai | Peter Bjorklund; Joel Eriksson | Ha-j | 3:35 |
| 5. | "Pikanchi Double" | Spin; Sakurai | Morimoto | Ishizuka | 5:07 |
| 6. | "Kotoba Yori Taisetsu na Mono" | Takeshi; Sakurai | Takehiko Iida | Ishizuka | 4:02 |
| 7. | "Hadashi no Mirai" | Ayumi Miyazaki | Miyazaki | Chokkaku | 4:41 |
| 8. | "Lucky Man" | Yukie Ozaki; Sakurai | Iida | Naoki Ōtsubo | 5:08 |
| 9. | "Blue" | Morimoto | Morimoto | Ha-j | 5:36 |
| 10. | "Tomadoi Nagara" | Hirō Ooyagi | Ooyagi | Ooyagi | 4:15 |
| 11. | "Fuyu no Nioi" | Girls Talk | Girls Talk | Ishizuka | 5:12 |
| 12. | "Pikanchi" | Takeshi Aida | Tanimoto | Chokkaku | 4:51 |
| 13. | "Nemuranai Karada" | Takaaki Amamoto | Hiroshi Yamamoto | Jun Abe | 4:31 |
| 14. | "Nice na Kokoroiki" | Masami Tozawa | Iida | Ishizuka | 4:00 |
| 15. | "A Day in Our Life" | Shun; Shuya | Shun; Shuya | Shun; Shuya | 4:47 |
| 16. | "La Tormenta 2004" (Regular edition only) | Takashi Miura; Sakurai | Taku Yoshioka | Yoshioka | 4:08 |
| Total length: | | | | | 74:21 |

DVD: The Clips of 1999→2004
| No. | Title | Director | Length |
|---|---|---|---|
| 1. | "Arashi" | Kensuke Kawamura |
| 2. | "Sunrise Nippon" | Kensuke Kawamura |
| 3. | "Typhoon Generation" | Tetsurō Takeuchi |
| 4. | "Kansha Kangeki Ame Arashi" | Yō Ōhashi |
| 5. | "Kimi no Tame ni Boku ga Iru" | Yasuyuki Yamaguchi |
| 6. | "Jidai" | Takamasa Takimoto |
| 7. | "A Day in Our Life" | Kensuke Kawamura |
| 8. | "Nice na Kokoroiki" | Kensuke Kawamura |
| 9. | "Pikanchi" | Yukihiko Tsutsumi |
| 10. | "Tomadoi Nagara" | Tetsuo Inoue |
| 11. | "Hadashi no Mirai" | Tetsuya Satō |
| 12. | "Kotoba Yori Taisetsu na Mono" | Tetsuya Satō |
| 13. | "Pikanchi Double" | Tetsuya Satō |
| 14. | "Hitomi no Naka no Galaxy" | Akihisa Takagi |
| 15. | "Hero" | Akihisa Takagi |
| 16. | "Lucky Man" | Kensuke Kawamura |

== Charts and certifications ==
=== Charts ===
| Chart (2004–2019) | Peak position |
|---|---|
| Japan Oricon album Weekly Chart | 1 |
| Japan Billboard Japan Hot Albums | 76 |
| Japan Billboard Japan Top Album Sales | 39 |

=== Sales and certifications ===
| Country | Provider | Sales | Certification |
|---|---|---|---|
| Japan | RIAJ | 126,532 | Gold |

== Release history ==
Release history and formats for 5x5 The Best Selection of 2002–2004
| Country | Date | Label | Format | Number |
|---|---|---|---|---|
| Japan | November 10, 2004 | J Storm | CD | JACA-5020 |
| Japan | November 10, 2004 | J Storm | 2CD | JACA-5019 |
| South Korea | September 12, 2006 | SM Entertainment | CD | SMJTCD156 |
| South Korea | September 12, 2006 | SM Entertainment | 2CD | |
