= Arashi Single Collection 1999–2001 =

Greatest hits album by Arashi
- Released: May 16, 2002
- Recorded: 1999–2001
- Genre: Pop; rock; dance; hip hop
- Length: 57:13
- Label: J-Storm; JACA-5001

Arashi chronology
Arashi No.1 Ichigou: Arashi wa Arashi o Yobu! (2001)	Arashi Single Collection 1999–2001 (2002)	Here We Go! (2002)

Singles from Arashi Single Collection 1999–2001
- 1. "Arashi" Released: November 3, 1999; 2. "Sunrise Nippon/Horizon" Released: April 5, 2000; 3. "Typhoon Generation" Released: July 12, 2000; 4. "Kansha Kangeki Ame Arashi" Released: November 8, 2000; 5. "Kimi no Tame ni Boku ga Iru" Released: April 18, 2001; 6. "Jidai" Released: August 1, 2001

Arashi Single Collection 1999–2001 (嵐 Single Collection 1999–2001) is the first compilation album of the Japanese boy band, Arashi. The album is also the first album of the group to be released under the J Storm record label. The album contains all of the singles the band released since their inception in 1999 to 2001 as well as several album tracks.

== Track listing ==
No.	Title	Lyrics	Music	Arrangement	Length
1.	"Arashi"	J&T	Kōji Makaino	Makaino	4:29
2.	"Ashita ni Mukatte"	Yūzō Otsuka	Makaino	Makaino	4:35
3.	"Sunrise Nippon"	F&T	Makaino	Chokkaku	4:45
4.	"Horizon"	Takeshi	Shin Tanimoto	Hitoshi Munakata; Naoki Hayashibe	5:11
5.	"Typhoon Generation"	Yōji Kubota	Makaino	Naoki Ōtsubo	5:02
6.	"Asu ni Mukatte Hoero"	Maria Kuze	Tanimoto	Chokkaku	5:22
7.	"Kansha Kangeki Ame Arashi"	Masami Tozawa	Makaino	Chokkaku	4:49
8.	"Ok! All Right! Ii Koi wo Shiyou"	Makaino	Tanimoto	Chokkaku
9.	"Kimi no Tame ni Boku ga Iru"	Kōhei Ōkura	Makaino	Makaino	3:47
10.	"Hanasanai!"	Emi Makiho	Seikō Nagaoka	Nagaoka	5:01
11.	"Jidai"	Tsukasa	Tsukasa	Chokkaku	4:56
12.	"Koi wa Breakin'"	Kuze	Makaino	Chokkaku	4:34
Total length:					57:13

== Charts ==
Chart (2002–2019)	Peak position
Japan Oricon album Weekly Chart	4
Japan Billboard Japan Top Album Sales	81

== Release history ==
Release history for Arashi Single Collection 1999–2001
Region	Date
Japan	May 16, 2002
Taiwan	June 5, 2002
