= Kimi no Uta =

Kimi no Uta may refer to:

- "Kimi no Uta" (song), a 2018 song by Arashi
- Kimi no Uta (album), a 2004 album by Mikuni Shimokawa
