= Jidai =

Jidai (時代) is the Japanese word for era and can refer to:

- Jidai (Arashi song)
- Jidai (Miyuki Nakajima song)
- Jidaimono, a Japanese dramatic genre;
- Jidaigeki, a Japanese dramatic genre.
