= Natsu Hayate =

Single by Arashi

from the album 5x20 All the Best!! 1999–2019
- B-side: "Midsummer Night's Lover"; "Sparkle"
- Released: July 25, 2018
- Recorded: 2018
- Length: 25:38
- Label: J Storm
- Composer(s): Yujin Kitagawa
- Lyricist(s): Yujin Kitagawa

Arashi singles chronology
"Find the Answer" (2018)	"Natsu Hayate" (2018)	"Kimi no Uta" (2018)

"Natsu Hayate" (夏疾風) is the 55th single by Japanese boy band Arashi. It was released on July 25, 2018, under their record label J Storm. "Natsu Hayate" was used as the theme song for Netto Koshien's 100th Japanese High School Baseball Championship.

== Single information ==
"Natsu Hayate" was released in three editions: a limited edition, a regular edition, and a limited "High School Baseball" edition. The limited editions feature a CD containing two songs and a karaoke track of the B-side song, as well as a DVD containing the music video and making of the single's title track "Natsu Hayate". The "High School Baseball" edition features a brass band version of "Natsu Hayate" along with the collaboration version of the music video. The regular edition contains three songs, each of which comes with an original karaoke track.

=== Songs ===
"Natsu Hayate" was used for ABC High School Baseball Fight Song and is the theme for Netto Koshien. Yujin Kitagawa of Yuzu was in charge of handling the lyrics and music. As a special "Arashi x Yuzu" collaboration project, this song is expected to bring a lot of excitement to this year's momentous 100th summer Koshien tournament. "Natsu Hayate" is the first song to be released during summer after a while. With the song made for summer, the song takes the freshness and brightness of summer, places it on top of a melody that's sure to energize, and turns it into a fight song celebrating all the high school students out there who are doing their best.

== Track listing ==
Regular edition
No.	Title	Lyrics	Music	Arrangement	Length
1.	"Natsu Hayate" (夏疾風)	Yujin Kitagawa	Kitagawa	K Project	4:20
2.	"Midsummer Night's Lover"	ASIL	Erik Lidbom; Mr.Mustard	Lidbom	4:08
3.	"Sparkle"	IROCO-STAR	Josef Melin; Christofer Erixon	Melin	4:21
4.	"Natsu Hayate" (instrumental)				4:20
5.	"Midsummer Night's Lover" (instrumental)				4:08
6.	"Sparkle" (instrumental)				4:17
Total length:					25:38

First-run limited edition
No.	Title	Lyrics	Music	Arrangement	Length
1.	"Natsu Hayate" (夏疾風)	Yujin Kitagawa	Kitagawa	K Project	4:20
2.	"After the Rain"	Nai-T	Nai-T	Nai-T; metropolitan digital clique	5:01
3.	"After the Rain" (instrumental)				4:57
Total length:					14:20

Limited "High School Baseball" edition
No.	Title	Lyrics	Music	Arrangement	Length
1.	"Natsu Hayate" (夏疾風)	Kitagawa	Kitagawa	K Project	4:20
2.	"Natsu Hayate (Netto Brass Band ver.)" (夏疾風 (熱闘ブラバン ver.); instrumental)	Kitagawa	Kitagawa	Tomoki Kikuya	2:34
Total length:					6:55

== Charts ==
Chart (2018)	Peak position
South Korea (Gaon Album Chart)	46
South Korea (Gaon International Album Chart)	2
