= Doors (Yūki no Kiseki) =

Single by Arashi

from the album 5x20 All the Best!! 1999–2019
- Released: November 8, 2017
- Recorded: 2017
- Genre: Pop
- Label: J Storm
- Composer(s): Simon Janlöv, Saw Arrow, Taku Yoshioka
- Lyricist(s): RUCCA

Arashi singles chronology
"Tsunagu" (2017)	"Doors (Yūki no Kiseki)" (2017)	"Find the Answer" (2018)

"Doors (Yūki no Kiseki)" (Doors〜勇気の軌跡〜) is the 53rd single by Japanese boy band Arashi. It was released on November 8, 2017 under their record label J Storm. "Doors (Yūki no Kiseki)" was used as the theme song for television drama Saki ni Umareta dake no Boku starring member Sho Sakurai, and "NOW or NEVER" was used in a Puzzle & Dragons commercial.

The single sold more than 500,000 copies in its first week and reached number 1 on Oricon's Weekly Single Chart. This is Arashi's 49th chart topping single and their 42nd consecutive chart topping single since "Pikanchi Double" (2004).

== Single information ==
"Doors (Yūki no Kiseki)" will be released in three editions: two types of first-run limited editions and a regular edition. The first-run limited edition 1 will have a CD containing two songs and a karaoke track, and a DVD containing music video and making of the single "Doors (Yūki no Kiseki)." The first-run limited edition 2 will contain two songs: "Doors (Yūki no Kiseki)" and "NOW or NEVER, and a DVD containing the music video and making of "NOW or NEVER." The regular edition contains four songs, each of which comes with an original karaoke track. It is described as a grand tie-in single full of content that will wrap up in 2017.

=== Songs ===
"Doors (Yūki no Kiseki)" is used as the theme song for the television drama Saki ni Umareta dake no Boku, starring member Sho Sakurai, which was first broadcast on October 14, 2017. The song is described as a warm, but powerful, slight ballad that contains a message about the importance of looking ahead and moving forward even though a person may have problems in relationships with other people. The lyricist RUCCA stated that he wrote the lyrics based on the theme in drama Saki ni Umareta dake no Boku.

The coupling song "NOW or NEVER" is used as the image song for a Puzzle & Dragons mobile game commercial. It is described as a jaunty, pop number with catchy and synchronized dance moves that inspired from Puzzle and Dragon's Drops movements.

== Track listing ==
Regular edition
No.	Title	Lyrics	Music	Arrangement	Length
1.	"Doors (Yūki no Kiseki)" (Doors〜勇気の軌跡〜)	RUCCA	Simon Janlöv; Saw Arrow	Taku Yoshioka	4:11
2.	"Now or Never"	Wonder Note	Wonder note; Kevin Charge	Wataru Maeguchi	4:02
3.	"Perfect Night"	Macoto56	Chris Meyer	Meyer	3:50
4.	"Border"	ASIL	HIKARI	HIKARI	3:48
5.	"Doors (Yūki no Kiseki)" (instrumental)				4:11
6.	"Now or Never" (instrumental)
7.	"Perfect Night" (instrumental)				3:50
8.	"Border" (instrumental)				3:46
Total length:					31:45

Limited edition 1
No.	Title	Lyrics	Music	Arrangement	Length
1.	"Doors (Yūki no Kiseki)" (Doors〜勇気の軌跡〜)	RUCCA	Janlöv; Saw Arrow	Yoshioka	4:11
2.	"Winter Days"	Ryosuke Imai	Imai; Tasuku Maeda	Imai; Maeda	3:42
3.	"Winter Days" (instrumental)				3:40
4.	"Doors (Yūki no Kiseki)" (video clip + making-of)				24:51

Limited edition 2
No.	Title	Lyrics	Music	Arrangement	Length
1.	"Doors (Yūki no Kiseki)" (Doors〜勇気の軌跡〜)	RUCCA	Janlöv; Saw Arrow	Yoshioka	4:11
2.	"Now or Never"	Wonder Note	Wonder Note; Charge	Maeguchi	4:01
3.	"Now or Never" (video clip + making-of)				28:34

== Chart performance ==
"Doors (Yūki no Kiseki)" debuted at number sixty-three on the Billboard Japan Hot 100 chart on November 6, 2017. The song peaked at number one two weeks later. The single debuted at number one on the Oricon daily singles chart selling 320,606 copies upon its release and 571,386 copies by the end of the week, topping the Oricon weekly singles chart. The single topped Billboard Japan's top single sales chart selling 596,665 copies in its first week.

== Charts and certifications ==
=== Weekly charts ===
Chart (2017)	Peak position
Japan (Oricon Singles Chart)	1
Japan (Billboard Japan Hot 100)	1
Japan (Billboard Japan Top Single Sales)	1

=== Sales and certifications ===
Region	Certification	Certified units/sales
Japan (RIAJ)	2× Platinum	625,707
