= Netto Koshien =

Netto Koshien or Nettoh Koshien (熱闘甲子園, Nettō Kōshien) is a television program in Japan providing a digest of the games of the summer National High School Baseball Championship, produced through a collaboration of TV Asahi and Asahi Broadcasting Corporation (ABC), and is shown as part of the ANN program.

Although this program was broadcast from the convention of 1981 of start time when the game of the day was called off because of serious calamities, such as heavy rain or a typhoon, and an earthquake, if applied by the convention of 1988 When the game of the day was called off because of the relation of the above natural situations, broadcast of a program also changed from the convention of 1989 to the example considered as a pause on that day.

The broadcast on 2004 August 18 was for 30 minutes starting at 5:05 AM because due to the Athens Olympic Games relay broadcast. (In the beginning, it was scheduled for 4:30 AM, as a measure by relay deployment, it wound beforehand for certain 35 minutes, and has fallen, and a part of program which was due to be broadcast to the next of this program was broadcast later.)

== All the past casters ==
- From Tokyo
  - Keikichi Morishita (1988)
  - Mina Nagashima (1998, 1999, 2001-)
  - Junko Yaginuma (2000) etc...
- From Osaka
  - Makoto Ashizawa (1991,1992) etc...

== Sponsor ==
- Matsushita Electric Industrial Co., Ltd.(1981-1988)
- Coca-Cola(1988-)
  - Matsushita Electric Industrial Co., Ltd. and Coca-Cola were the official sponsors at the time of the broadcast in 1988. From 1089 Coca-Cola became a sole sponsor since 1989. Although it has temporarily two or more official sponsors alongside Coca-Cola. Coca-Cola became the main sponsor of Nettoh in 2003 again. Since then, a "Coca-Cola summer special" or "powered by Coca-Cola" tends to enter in front or after "Netto Koshien". In addition, Coca-Cola and follow sponsors are also partners of the main coverage of ABC/TV Asahi coverage of the Summer Koshien, including Nettoh.
  - TamaHome (2005-)
