= Dream "A" Live =

Dream "A"live

Studio album by Arashi
- Released: April 23, 2008
- Genre: Pop, R&B, rock
- Length: 59:26 (Regular edition); 76:28 (Limited edition)
- Label: J Storm

Arashi chronology
Time (2007)	Dream "A"live (2008)	All the Best! 1999–2009 (2009)

Singles from Dream "A"live
- 1. "Happiness" Released: September 5, 2007; 2. "Step and Go" Released: February 20, 2008

Dream "A"live is the eighth studio album by Japanese boy band, Arashi. The album was released on April 23, 2008, in Japan under their record label J Storm in two editions: a limited 2CD version and a regular CD version. Dream "A"live is the 30th best-selling album of 2008 in Japan. As of July 2010, the album is the group's third highest-selling album after their tenth anniversary album All the Best! 1999–2009 and debut album Arashi No.1 Ichigou: Arashi wa Arashi o Yobu!. It was released digitally on February 7, 2020.

== Album information ==
The album contains the singles "Happiness", which was used as the theme song for the drama Yamada Tarō Monogatari, and "Step and Go". Although production of the album began during the release of "Happiness", word of the new album did not surface until March 2008 when the album available for pre-order on online stores, with the two editions even reaching as high as the top two spots on CDJapan's Pre-Order Ranking.

=== Title ===
During Sho Sakurai's radio show Sho Beat on March 2, 2008, it was revealed that the Dream "A" Live title was created by Sakurai and Jun Matsumoto. The original title was "Alive", but was then purposely divided into "A live" to indicate the group's name and the live performance. Matsumoto also added "Dream" to the title to signify how "dreams can turn into reality" because the coincided Arashi Marks 2008 Dream-A-Live tour was considered a major achievement, as only two other Johnny's groups had previously performed a five-dome tour.

== Critical reception ==
Professional ratings
Review scores
Source	Rating
AllMusic	3/5 stars

Adam Greenberg on AllMusic gave Dream "A"live three out of five stars, calling it a "decent album throughout, well-crafted and well-performed".

Aside from topping the sales rankings, Oricon also reported that the album was a hit with male buyers. Even men in the 40-year-old age bracket had planned to buy the album, compared to the interest with the group's previous album. The music statistics group attributed the group's increasing fan base to their primetime variety program Himitsu no Arashi-chan (ひみつの嵐ちゃん!, Arashi's Secrets) and the various dramas and commercials that the members have appeared in. It was considered quite a development, since many promotions and releases of Johnny's artists are geared towards female teens and young adults.

== Commercial performance ==
The album debuted at the number one on the Oricon singles daily chart upon its release with the sales index number of 57,795 (about 101,000 copies). By the end of its first week, the album sold a total of 220,722 copies. The album ranked as the 30th best-selling album of 2008 in Japan, selling 303,727 by the end of the year.

On January 1, 2009, the album was placed at number 38 on Billboard Japan's 2008 Top Albums Year-End list.

== Track listing ==
No.	Title	Lyrics	Music	Arrangement	Length
1.	"Theme of Dream "A" Live"		Ha-j	Ha-j	1:43
2.	"Move Your Body"	Hydrant; Sho Sakurai	Mike Rose	Ha-j	3:17
3.	"Happiness"	Wonderland	Mio Okada	Gin Kitagawa	4:18
4.	"Niji no Kanata e"	Tomokazu Miura; Sakurai	Kei Yoshikawa	Masaya Suzuki	4:58
5.	"Do My Best"	Youth Case	Youth Case	Kitagawa	4:20
6.	"Sirius"	Unite	Tateki Kobayashi	Tomoki Ishizuka	4:38
7.	"Flashback"	Takashi Ogawa; Sakurai	Akinori Imai	Jun Abe	4:39
8.	"Dive into the Future"	Unite	Mattias Håkansson; Carl Utbult; Anton Malmberg	Masayuki Iwata	4:11
9.	"Koe"	Ogawa	Shinya Tada	Naoki-T	4:26
10.	"My Answer"	Shitamachi Kyōdai; Sakurai	Shitamachi Kyōdai	Shitamachi Kyōdai	3:59
11.	"Life Goes On"	Tada	Iwata	Iwata	4:41
12.	"Step and Go"	Wonderland; Sakurai	Youth Case	Taku Yoshioka	4:50
13.	"Your Song"	Katsuhiko Sugiyama	Sugiyama	Tetsuya Takahashi	5:06
14.	"Once Again" (Regular edition only)	Wonderland; Sakurai	Alfred Tuohey; Thanh Bui	Chokkaku	4:20
Total length:					59:26

Limited edition – CD 2
No.	Title	Lyrics	Music	Arrangement	Length
1.	"Hello Goodbye" (Masaki Aiba solo)	100+	100+	Ishizuka	3:55
2.	"Gimmick Game" (Kazunari Ninomiya solo)	Ninomiya	Ninomiya	ISB; Ninomiya	3:36
3.	"Take Me Faraway" (Satoshi Ohno solo)	R.P.P	R.P.P	R.P.P	4:30
4.	"Naked" (Jun Matsumoto solo)	Matsumoto; Yuka Hirota	Yoshioka	Yoshioka	5:17
5.	"Hip Pop Boogie" (Sho Sakurai solo)	Sakurai	Count Force	Count Force	4:09
Total length:					76:28

== Personnel ==
=== Musicians ===
- Arashi
  - Masaki Aiba – vocals
  - Jun Matsumoto – vocals
  - Kazunari Ninomiya – vocals
  - Satoshi Ohno – vocals
  - Sho Sakurai – vocals
- Masayuki Iwata - arrangement, keyboard, electric guitar, chorus
- Jun Abe – piano, keyboard
- Akira – choir, chorus
- Tanakam Ayuko – choir, chorus
- Melvin Lee Davis – electric bass
- Naoki Hayashibe – acoustic guitar
- Masato Ishinari – acoustic guitar, electric guitar, electric sitar
- Gen Strings Ittetsu – strings
- Ikuo Kakehashi – percussion
- Daisuke Kawai – organ
- Takahiro Miyazaki – alto saxophone
- Susumu Nishikawa – acoustic guitar, electric guitar
- Hideaki Sakai – percussion
- Satoshi Sano – trombone, chromatic harmonica
- Shiro Sasaki – trumpet
- Yasushi Sasamoto – keyboard
- Hiroomi Shitara – acoustic guitar, electric guitar
- Masanori Suzuki – trumpet
- Tetsuya Takahashi – keyboard, choir, chorus
- Takeshi Taneda – electric bass
- Tomohiko Tsuya – choir, chorus
- Jun Usuba – tenor saxophone
- Ryoji Yamashiki – electric bass

=== Production ===
- Jun Abe – programming
- Takeshi Hanzawa – photography
- Gen Strings Ittetsu – string arrangements
- Julie K. – producer
- Hiroshi Kawasaki – mastering
- Mike Rose
- Yasushi Sasamoto – programming
- Tsutomu Satomi – coordination
- Tetsuya Takahashi – programming
- Akitomo Takakuwa – engineer, mixing
- Takao – stylist
- Shigeru Tanida – engineer, mixing
- Noboru Tomizawa – make-up, hair stylist
- Asuka Tozawa – coordination
- Alfred Tuohey
- Carl Utbult
- Youth Case – lyricist, composer

== Charts and certifications ==
=== Weekly charts ===
Chart (2008)	Peak position
Japanese Albums (Oricon)	1

=== Year-end charts ===
Chart (2008)	Peak position
Japanese Albums (Oricon)	30

=== Sales and certifications ===
Country	Provider	Sales	Certification
Japan	RIAJ	303,727	Platinum

== Release history ==
Release history and formats for Dream "A" Live
Country	Date	Label	Format	Catalog
Japan	April 23, 2008	J Storm	CD	JACA-5091
Japan	April 23, 2008	J Storm	2CD	JACA-5089-5090
Taiwan	May 9, 2008	Avex Taiwan	CD	JAJCD26004
Taiwan	May 9, 2008	Avex Taiwan	2CD	JAJCD26004/A
Hong Kong	May 14, 2008	Avex Asia	CD	
Hong Kong	May 14, 2008	Avex Asia	2CD	
Korea	August 19, 2008	SM Entertainment	CD	SMJTCD271
Korea	August 19, 2008	SM Entertainment	2CD	SMJTCD270
