= Find the Answer =

Single by Arashi

from the album 5x20 All the Best!! 1999–2019
- Released: February 21, 2018
- Recorded: 2017
- Label: J Storm; JACA-5717-5718 (First-run limited edition (CD+DVD)); JACA-5719 (Regular edition (CD))
- Songwriter(s): 7th Avenue * Takamitsu Ishizu

Arashi singles chronology
| "Doors (Yūki no Kiseki)" (2017) | "Find the Answer" (2018) | "Natsu Hayate" (2018) |

"Find the Answer" is the 54th single by Japanese boy band Arashi. It was released on February 21, 2018 under their record label J Storm. "Find the Answer" was used as the theme song for television drama 99.9 Keiji Senmon Bengoshi — Season II starring member Jun Matsumoto.

== Single information ==
"Find the Answer" was released in two editions: a limited edition and a regular edition. The first-run limited edition was a CD containing two songs and a karaoke track of the B-side song, and a DVD containing the music video and making of "Find the Answer". The regular edition contains four songs, each of which comes with an original karaoke track.

=== Songs ===
"Find the Answer" is used as the theme song for the television drama 99.9 Keiji Senmon Bengoshi — Season II, starring member Jun Matsumoto, which was first broadcast on January 14, 2018. The song debuted first at the ending credits of the first broadcast of the drama. Just like the previous song used for the first season of the drama, "Find the Answer" includes an "enveloping tenderness" that describes Matsumoto's character in the drama who, even when facing the most difficult cases, "will push forward in belief of a 0.1 percent possibility". The song was described as simple and with an upbeat tempo.

The fourth track of the regular edition, titled "Shiro ga Mau" (白が舞う) was used as the theme song for the Nippon Television network's coverage of the 2018 Winter Olympics in Pyeongchang, which featured member Sho Sakurai as the main newscaster. Following "Power of the Paradise", this is the seventh time the group has provided the theme song for NTV's news coverage for Summer and Winter Olympic Games. The song is described as powerful, yet filled with tenderness to inspire courage for the athletes who continue to step up to challenges.

== Track listing ==
Regular edition
| No. | Title | Lyrics | Music | Arrangement | Length |
|---|---|---|---|---|---|
| 1. | "Find the Answer" | HIKARI | 7th Avenue; HIKARI | Metropolitan Digital Clique | 4:03 |
| 2. | "Circle" | Paddy | Ryosuke Imai; Tasuku Maeda | Taku Yoshioka | 3:31 |
| 3. | "Bounce Beat" | IROCO-STAR | Henrik Nordenback; Christian Fast; Samuel Waermö | Nordenback | 3:44 |
| 4. | "Shiro ga Mau" (白が舞う) | Funk Uchino | Erik Lidbom; Eltvo | Lidbom | 4:50 |
| 5. | "Find the Answer" (instrumental) | | | | 4:03 |
| 6. | "Circle" (instrumental) | | | | 3:29 |
| 7. | "Bounce Beat" (instrumental) | | | | 3:44 |
| 8. | "Shiro ga Mau" (instrumental) | | | | 4:46 |
| Total length: | | | | | 32:14 |

Limited edition
| No. | Title | Lyrics | Music | Arrangement | Length |
|---|---|---|---|---|---|
| 1. | "Find the Answer" | HIKARI | 7th Avenue; HIKARI | Metropolitan Digital Clique | 4:03 |
| 2. | "Machikado no Koibitotachi" (街角の恋人たち) | Goro.T | Kevin Charge; Ricky Hanley; Carlos Okabe; Saw Arrow | Tomoki Ishizuka | 4:25 |
| 3. | "Machikado no Koibitotachi" (instrumental) | | | | 4:21 |
| 4. | "Find the Answer" (video clip + making-of) |
| Total length: | | | | | 12:49 |

== Charts and certifications ==
=== Weekly charts ===
| Chart (2017) | Peak position |
|---|---|
| Japan (Oricon Singles Chart) | 1 |
| Japan (Billboard Japan Hot 100) | 1 |
| Japan (Billboard Japan Top Single Sales) | 1 |
| South Korea (Gaon Album Chart) | 45 |
| South Korea (Gaon International Album Chart) | 1 |

=== Sales and certifications ===
| Region | Certification | Certified units/sales |
|---|---|---|
| Japan (RIAJ) | Platinum | 250,000^{^} |
^{^} Shipments figures based on certification alone.

== Release history ==
| Country | Release date | Label | Format | Catalog |
|---|---|---|---|---|
| Japan | February 21, 2018 | J Storm | CD+DVD | JACA-5717-5718 |
| Japan | February 21, 2018 | J Storm | CD | JACA-5719 |
