= Ashita no Kioku / Crazy Moon (Kimi wa Muteki) =

2009 single by Arashi

"Ashita no Kioku/Crazy Moon (Kimi wa Muteki)"

Single by Arashi

from the album All the Best! 1999–2009
- Released: May 27, 2009
- Recorded: 2009
- Genre: Pop
- Label: J Storm
- Songwriter(s): Ashita no Kioku: Yoshitaka Taira; Crazy Moon (Kimi wa Muteki): Soluna · Hyper Slipper

Arashi singles chronology
"Believe / Kumorinochi, Kaisei" (2009)	"Ashita no Kioku/Crazy Moon (Kimi wa Muteki)" (2009)	"Everything" (2009)

"Ashita no Kioku/Crazy Moon (Kimi wa Muteki)" (明日の記憶／Crazy Moon～キミ・ハ・ムテキ～, Memories of Tomorrow/Crazy Moon (You Are Invincible)) is a single release by Japanese boy band Arashi. "Ashita no Kioku" was used as the theme song for the drama The Quiz Show 2 starring Arashi member Sho Sakurai, and "Crazy Moon (Kimi wa Muteki)" was used as the theme song for Kose's Esprique Precious cosmetics line commercial. The single was released in three editions: a regular edition containing a bonus track and instrumental versions of all the songs released in the single, and two limited edition both containing a DVD with a music video of one of the A-side tracks.

== Single information ==
"Ashita no Kioku" is a mid-tempo and dramatic number, with lyrics about an "indelible past" and a hope for a better future. The full song was first heard on Ohno's radio program Arashi Discovery on May 1, 2009, and first shots of the promotional video premiered on NTV's news program Zoom-in Super! on May 13, 2009. A longer, two-minute preview of the song's music video premiered on Space Shower TV on May 22, 2009. The song was named Best Theme Song in the 61st Television Drama Academy Awards.

"Crazy Moon (Kimi wa Muteki)" was described a fast-paced 80's themed dance number. About one month before the single's release, the group performed the song on the Japanese music show Utaban on April 26, 2009.

== Chart performance ==
The single debuted at the number-one position on Oricon Daily Singles Ranking, selling over 230,000 copies in the first day. By the end of its first week, it sold 502,487 copies, the group's second best debut week sales figures since their 1999 debut single, "Arashi". With its first week sales of over 502,000, the single has the best first week sales of 2009. Also, with their previous single "Believe/Kumorinochi, Kaisei," the single makes Arashi the first artist in seven years and seven months to have achieved two consecutive singles that exceeds the 500,000 mark in first week sales. The last time an artist has achieved two consecutive was Keisuke Kuwata with his singles "Naminori Johnny" (波乗りジョニー, "Surfing Johnny") (July 2001) and "Shiroi Koibito Tachi" (白い恋人たち, "White Lovers") (October 2001).

The single is the second single to cross the 600,000 mark in 2009, after the group's first 2009 single release, "Believe/Kumorinochi, Kaisei." It was certified Double Platinum by Recording Industry Association of Japan (RIAJ). By selling a total of 620,557 copies by the end of the year, "Ashita no Kioku/Crazy Moon (Kimi wa Muteki)" is the second best-selling single of 2009 in Japan, right after "Believe/Kumorinochi, Kaisei".

== Track listing ==
Regular edition
No.	Title	Lyrics	Music	Arrangement	Length
1.	"Ashita no Kioku"	Yoshitaka Taira	Taira	Tomoki Ishizuka; Hirofumi Sasaki	4:59
2.	"Crazy Moon (Kimi wa Muteki)"	Soluna	Hyper Slipper	Hyper Slipper	4:00
3.	"Ashita no Kioku" (Instrumental)	Taira	Taira	Ishizuka; Sasaki	4:59
4.	"Crazy Moon (Kimi wa Muteki)" (Instrumental)	Soluna	Hyper Slipper	Hyper Slipper	4:00
Total length:					17:58

Limited edition 1
No.	Title	Lyrics	Music	Arrangement	Length
1.	"Ashita no Kioku"	Taira	Taira	Ishizuka; Sasaki	4:59
2.	"Crazy Moon (Kimi wa Muteki)"	Soluna	Hyper Slipper	Hyper Slipper	4:00
Total length:					8:59

Limited edition 1 – DVD
No.	Title	Length
1.	"Ashita no Kioku" (Music video)

Limited edition 2
No.	Title	Lyrics	Music	Arrangement	Length
1.	"Crazy Moon (Kimi wa Muteki)"	Soluna	Hyper Slipper	Hyper Slipper	4:00
2.	"Ashita no Kioku"	Taira	Taira	Ishizuka; Sasaki	4:59
Total length:					8:59

Limited edition 2 – DVD
No.	Title	Length
1.	"Crazy Moon (Kimi wa Muteki)" (Music video)

== Charts and certifications ==
=== Weekly charts ===
Chart (2009)	Peak position
Japan (Oricon Singles Chart)	1
Japan (Japan Hot 100) (Note: Chart position for "Ashita no Kioku".)	1
Japan (Japan Hot 100) (Note: Chart position for "Crazy Moon (Kimi wa Muteki)".)	2

=== Year-end charts ===
Chart (2009)	Peak position
Japan (Oricon Singles Chart)	2

=== Certifications ===
Region	Certification	Certified units/sales
Japan (RIAJ)	2× Platinum	620,557

== Release history ==
Release history and formats for "Ashita no Kioku" / "Crazy Moon (Kimi wa Muteki)"
Region	Date	Format	Distributor
Japan	May 27, 2009	CD single (JACA-5173); CD+DVD (JACA-5169); CD+DVD (JACA-5171)	J Storm
South Korea	June 10, 2009	CD single (SMJTCD306); CD+DVD (SMJTCD306B); CD+DVD (SMJTCD307B)	SM Entertainment
Taiwan	June 12, 2009	CD single (JAJSG27022); CD+DVD (JAJSG27022/A); CD+DVD (JAJSG27022/B)	Avex Taiwan
Hong Kong	June 18, 2009	CD single CD+DVD; CD+DVD	Avex Asia
