= Believe / Kumorinochi, Kaisei =

Single by Arashi

from the album All the Best! 1999–2009
- B-side: "Tobira"
- Released: March 4, 2009
- Genre: Pop; dance-pop
- Label: J Storm
- Songwriters: Believe: 100+ · Sho Sakurai; Kumorinochi, Kaisei: Shinya Tada · QQ

Arashi singles chronology
"Beautiful Days" (2008)	"Believe / Kumorinochi, Kaisei" (2009)	"Ashita no Kioku / Crazy Moon (Kimi wa Muteki)" (2009)

"Believe" / "Kumorinochi, Kaisei" (Believe/曇りのち、快晴, Believe/Cloudy to Nice Weather) is a single released by Japanese boy band Arashi. It was released on March 4, 2009 through their record label J Storm. "Believe" was used as the theme song for the Takashi Miike movie Yatterman starring Arashi member Sho Sakurai, and "Kumorinochi Kaisei" was used as the theme song for the drama Uta no Oniisan (歌のおにいさん, Brother of Songs) starring member Satoshi Ohno. The single was released in three editions: a regular edition containing a bonus track and instrumental versions of all the songs released in the single, and two limited edition both containing a DVD with a music video of one of the A-side tracks.

== Single information ==
"Believe" is the group's first single to have two music videos: a live action and an animated version. The animated video was released on Dwango by animation studio Tatsunoko and the group's record label J Storm. It was later re-released as a bonus in the group's 10th anniversary DVD 5x10 All the Best! Clips 1999-2009 on October 28, 2009. In the animated video, the members transformed into characters from Tatsunoko's Time Bokan anime series. The live action is included in one of the limited editions of the single.

For "Kumorinochi, Kaisei", Ohno sang the track solo and released it under his drama character's name, Kenta Yano (矢野健太, Yano Kenta). The song was also named Best Theme Song in the 60th Television Drama Academy Awards.

== Chart performance ==
In the first half of the year Oricon ranking, "Believe/Kumorinochi, Kaisei" had sold more than 646,000 copies, surpassing the final sales numbers of "Truth/Kaze no Mukō e" in 2008. It sold 501,988 copies during its first week, making it the first single to break half a million in its opening week since KAT-TUN's debut release, "Real Face", of 754,000 in April 2006. The single had the highest first week sales of 2009 until it was topped by the group's next single, "Ashita no Kioku/Crazy Moon (Kimi wa Muteki)".

The single was certified Double Platinum by the Recording Industry Association of Japan. On December 18, 2009, Oricon declared "Believe/Kumorinochi, Kaisei" to be the best-selling single of 2009 in Japan by selling a total of 656,676 copies.

== Track listing ==
Regular edition
No.	Title	Lyrics	Music	Arrangement	Length
1.	"Believe"	100+; Sho Sakurai	100+	Taku Yoshioka	4:48
2.	"Kumorinochi, Kaisei"	Shinya Tada	QQ	QQ; Hirofumi Sasaki	4:15
3.	"Tobira" (トビラ, "Door")	Makoto Atozi	Tada	Naoki-T	4:20
4.	"Believe" (Instrumental)	100+; Sakurai	100+	Yoshioka	4:48
5.	"Kumorinochi, Kaisei" (Instrumental)	Tada	QQ	QQ; Sasaki	4:15
6.	"Tobira" (Instrumental)	Atozi	Tada	Naoki-T	4:20
Total length:					26:46

Limited edition 1
No.	Title	Lyrics	Music	Arrangement	Length
1.	"Believe"	100+; Sakurai	100+	Taku Yoshioka	4:48
2.	"Kumorinochi, Kaisei"	Shinya Tada	QQ	QQ; Sasaki	4:15
Total length:					9:03

Limited edition 1 – DVD
No.	Title	Length
1.	"Believe" (Music video)

Limited edition 2
No.	Title	Lyrics	Music	Arrangement	Length
1.	"Kumorinochi, Kaisei"	Shinya Tada	QQ	QQ; Sasaki	4:48
2.	"Believe"	100+; Sakurai	100+	Taku Yoshioka	4:15
Total length:					9:03

Limited edition 2 – DVD
No.	Title	Length
1.	"Kumorinochi, Kaisei" (Music video)

== Charts and certifications ==
=== Weekly charts ===
Chart (2008)	Peak position
Japan (Oricon Singles Chart)	1
Japan (Japan Hot 100) (Note: Peak chart position for "Believe".)	1
Japan (Japan Hot 100) (Note: Peak chart position for "Kumorinochi, Kaisei".)	2

=== Year-end charts ===
Chart (2009)	Peak position
Japan (Oricon Singles Chart)	1

=== Certifications ===
Region	Certification	Certified units/sales
Japan (RIAJ)	2× Platinum	656,676

== Release history ==
Release history and formats for "Believe" / "Kumorinochi, Kaisei"
Region	Date	Format	Distributor
Japan	March 4, 2009	CD single (JACA-5136); CD+DVD (JACA-5132); CD+DVD (JACA-5134)	J Storm
South Korea	March 18, 2009	CD single (SMJTCD290); CD+DVD (SMJTCD288B); CD+DVD (SMJTCD289B)	SM Entertainment
Taiwan	March 20, 2009	CD single (JAJSG27020); CD+DVD (JAJSG27020/A)	Avex Taiwan
Hong Kong	March 26, 2009	CD single CD+DVD; CD+DVD	Avex Asia
