= Kimi no Uta (song) =

2018 single by Arashi

- Regular edition cover

Single by Arashi

from the album 5x20 All the Best!! 1999–2019
- B-side: "Sky Again"; "Fake It"; "Count on Me"; "White on White"
- Released: 24 October 2018
- Length: 4:33
- Label: J Storm
- Songwriter(s): Asil; Shinya Tada; A.K. Janeway; Hirofumi Sasaki

Arashi singles chronology
"Natsu Hayate" (2018)	"Kimi no Uta" (2018)	"Brave" (2019)

"Kimi no Uta" (君のうた) is the 56th single by Japanese boy band Arashi. It was released on 24 October 2018 through their record label J Storm. "Kimi no Uta" debuted at number 69 on the Billboard Japan Hot 100 chart before moving up to number one the following week. It also debuted number one on the Oricon weekly chart. The song was used as the theme song for the TV Asahi television series Boku to Shippo to Kagurazaka.

== Background and release ==
On 12 June 2018, it was announced that member Masaki Aiba would star in the television series Boku to Shippo to Kagurazaka. Two months later, on 12 September, Arashi announced that their next single would be used as the theme song for the television series. On 15 September, Arashi's commercial for Japan Airlines' "Fly For It!" campaign, featuring the B-side "Sky Again", began airing nationwide in Japan. On 22 September, the full song was revealed on Aiba's radio show. The track listing and jacket covers were revealed on 28 September. A 34-second preview of the music video was published on the group's official website on 5 October. Morning news programs began airing previews of the music video on the same day. Aiba played the B-side "White on White" on his radio show on 13 October. Song previews for "Kimi no Uta" and "Sky Again" were added to the group's official website on 18 October.

Arashi performed "Kimi no Uta" on Music Station on 19 October 2018. They performed the song on VS Arashi (ja) on 27 October. The single was released on 24 October 2018 in Japan.

== Chart performance ==
"Kimi no Uta" debuted at number 69 on the Billboard Japan Hot 100 chart on the date ending 15 October 2018. The single debuted at number one on the Oricon daily single chart, selling 207,787 copies upon its release.

== Track listing ==
No.	Title	Lyrics	Music	Arrangement	Length
1.	"Kimi no Uta" (君のうた, "Your Song")	Asil	Shinya Tada; A.K. Janeway	Hirofumi Sasaki	4:33
2.	"Sky Again"	Goro.T	Erik Lidbom	Lidbom	5:06
3.	"Fake It"	Hikari	Hikari; Kevin Charge	Charge	3:48
4.	"Count on Me"	Funk Uchino	Lidbom; Saori Tsuchiya	Tomoki Ishizuka	4:28
5.	"Kimi no Uta" (instrumental)				4:33
6.	"Sky Again" (instrumental)				5:06
7.	"Fake It" (instrumental)				3:48
8.	"Count on Me" (instrumental)				42:37
Total length:					74:02

Limited edition
No.	Title	Lyrics	Music	Arrangement	Length
1.	"Kimi no Uta"	Asil	Tada; Janeway	Sasaki	4:33
2.	"White on White"	Iroco-Star	Josef Melin	Melin	4:10
3.	"White on White" (instrumental)				4:06
4.	"Kimi no Uta video clip" (DVD)
5.	"Kimi no Uta making-of" (DVD)
Total length:					12:49

== Charts ==
Chart (2018)	Peak position
Japan (Oricon Weekly Singles Chart)	1
Japan (Billboard Japan Hot 100)	1
South Korean Albums (Gaon)	43
South Korean International Albums (Gaon)	3
