= Arashi No.1 Ichigou: Arashi wa Arashi o Yobu! =

Arashi No.1: Arashi wa Arashi wo Yobu

Studio album by Arashi
- Released: January 24, 2001
- Recorded: 1999–2001
- Genre: Pop; hip hop; R&B
- Length: 63:11
- Label: Pony Canyon

Arashi chronology
Arashi No.1: Arashi wa Arashi wo Yobu (2001)	Arashi Single Collection 1999–2001 (2002)

Singles from Arashi No.1: Arashi wa Arashi wo Yobu
- 1. "Arashi" Released: November 3, 1999; 2. "Sunrise Nippon" Released: April 5, 2000; 3. "Typhoon Generation" Released: July 12, 2000; 4. "Kansha Kangeki Ame Arashi" Released: November 8, 2000

Arashi No.1: Arashi wa Arashi wo Yobu (ARASHI No.1〜嵐は嵐を呼ぶ〜, Arashi Number One: The Storm Calls the Storm) (Note: The No.1 is pronounced as Ichigō (イチゴウ).) is the debut studio album by Japanese boy band Arashi. The album was released on January 24, 2001 in Japan under the record label Pony Canyon in two editions: a regular CD version containing a 32-page booklet and a limited version containing stickers and a deluxe box case. It was released digitally on February 7, 2020.

== Singles ==
The album contains the singles "Arashi", which was used as the theme song for the band's mini-drama V no Arashi, "Sunrise Nippon", "Typhoon Generation" and "Kansha Kangeki Ame Arashi".

== Commercial performance ==
The album debuted at number one on the Oricon chart with initial sales of 267,220 copies. Until the release of All the Best! 1999–2009, the album remained the group's best-selling album with overall sales of around 323,000 for nearly ten years.

== Track listing ==
CD
No.	Title	Lyrics	Music	Arrangement	Length
1.	"Introduction: Storm" (instrumental)		Masaya Suzuki	Suzuki	1:45
2.	"Arashi"	J&T	Kōji Makaino	Makaino	4:28
3.	"Dangan Liner"	Takeshi	Shin Tanimoto	Chokkaku	4:07
4.	"Sunrise Nippon"	F&T	Makaino	Chokkaku	4:45
5.	"Sawarenai"	Masami Tozawa	Kenichi Shōno	Shōno	4:45
6.	"Kansha Kangeki Ame Arashi"	Tozawa	Makaino	Chokkaku	4:49
7.	"Ai to Yūki to Cherry Pie"	Tozawa	Masayuki Iwata	Iwata	5:18
8.	"Deep na Bōken"	Tozawa	Takehiko Iida	Chokkaku	4:38
9.	"Helpless"	Yūki Shiina	Zaki	Iwata	5:10
10.	"On Sunday"	Tozawa	Shigeki Moriyama	Hitoshi Munekata	5:07
11.	"Yasei o Shiritai"	Yōji Kubota	Zaki	Zaki	4:33
12.	"Allergy"	Takeshi	Iwata	Iwata	4:03
13.	"Kokoro Chirari"	Takeshi	Kazuhiro Hara	Hara	4:37
14.	"Typhoon Generation"	Kubota	Makaino	Naoki Ōtsubo	4:59
Total length:					63:09

== Charts and certifications ==
=== Weekly charts ===
Chart (2001)	Peak position
Japan (Oricon Albums Chart)	1

Chart (2020)	Peak position
Japan (Billboard Japan Hot Albums)	22
Japan (Billboard Japan Download Albums)	7

=== Certifications ===
Region	Certification	Certified units/sales
Japan (RIAJ)	Platinum	400,000^{^}
^{^} Shipments figures based on certification alone.

== Release history ==
Region	Date	Format	Label
Japan	January 24, 2001	CD (PCCJ-00004)	Pony Canyon
Various	February 7, 2020	Digital download	J Storm
