= Here We Go! (Arashi album) =

Studio album by Arashi
- Released: July 17, 2002
- Genre: Pop; hip hop; R&B
- Length: 64:31
- Label: J Storm

Arashi chronology
Arashi Single Collection 1999–2001 (2002)	Here We Go! (2002)	How's It Going? (2003)

Singles from Here We Go!
- 1. "A Day in Our Life" Released: February 6, 2002; 2. "Nice na Kokoroiki" Released: April 17, 2002

Here We Go! is the second studio album by Japanese boy band Arashi. It is the first studio album to be released under their new label J Storm after moving from the Pony Canyon label. The album was released in Japan on July 17, 2002, in two editions: a regular edition and a first-press limited edition. Both editions bear different covers. It was certified gold by the RIAJ in July 2002. The album was released digitally on February 7, 2020.

== Singles ==
The album includes the singles "A Day in Our Life", the main theme song for the drama Kisarazu Cat's Eye starring V6 member Junichi Okada, Arashi member Sho Sakurai, Ryuta Sato and Yoshinori Okada, and "Nice na Kokoroiki", the eleventh ending theme song for the anime Kochira Katsushika-ku Kameari Kōen-mae Hashutsujo.

== Track listing ==
No.	Title	Lyrics	Music	Arrangement	Length
1.	"Theme of Arashi"	Masayuki Iwata; Show	Iwata; Larry Hochman	Iwata; Hochman	4:51
2.	"Easy Crazy Break Down"	Masami Tozawa	Michael Clauss; Clas Wrigsell	Masaya Suzuki	3:46
3.	"Kimi wa Sukoshi mo Warukunai"	Tozawa	Iwata	Iwata	4:50
4.	"Tokyo Lovers Tune Night"	Yōji Kubota	Charles Hodgkinson; Sagat Guirey; Kirk Zavieh	Hodgkinson; Guirey; Zavieh	3:47
5.	"A Day in Our Life"	Shun; Shuya	Shun; Shuya	Shun; Shuya	4:41
6.	"All or Nothing Ver.1.02"	Takeshi Aida; Show	Zaki	Zaki	5:08
7.	"Nemuranai Karada"	Takaaki Amamoto	Hiroshi Yamamoto	Umi to Yamamoto-kun; Jun Abe	4:33
8.	"Kimi wa Inai kara"	Kubota	Ichiro Terada	Iwata	4:45
9.	"Iro Asenaide"	Tozawa	Takehiko Iida	Chokkaku	5:00
10.	"Aishiteru to Ienai"	Tozawa	Seikō Nagaoka	Nagaoka	5:39
11.	"Hoshi no Freeway"	Toru Hiruma	Zaki	Zaki	4:41
12.	"Ima Ai o Katarou"	Sumiyo Mutsumu	Iida	Suzuki	4:14
13.	"Wow!!"	Kazunori Watanabe	Watanabe	Watanabe	4:37
14.	"Nice na Kokoroiki"	Tozawa	Iida	Tomoki Ishizuka	3:59
Total length:					64:31

== Charts and certifications ==
=== Weekly charts ===
Chart (2002)	Peak position
Japan (Oricon Albums Chart)	2

=== Certifications ===
Region	Certification	Certified units/sales
Japan (RIAJ)	Gold	200,000^{^}
^{^} Shipments figures based on certification alone.
