= Beautiful Days (song) =

Single by Arashi

from the album All the Best! 1999–2009
- Released: November 5, 2008
- Genre: Pop
- Label: J Storm
- Songwriter: Takuya Harada

Arashi singles chronology
"Truth / Kaze no Mukō e" (2008)	"Beautiful Days" (2008)	"Believe / Kumorinochi, Kaisei" (2009)

"Beautiful Days" is the twenty-fourth single from the Japanese boy band Arashi. It was used as the theme song for the drama Ryūsei no Kizuna, starring Arashi member Kazunari Ninomiya.

According to Oricon, the single ranked the tenth best-selling single in Japan for the year 2008.

== Single information ==
The single was released in two editions: a regular edition containing six tracks which includes the instrumental versions, and a limited edition containing the title track and a DVD of the music video. "Beautiful Days" was the group's fourth single to be released in 2008, the most number of singles released in a year for the group. The release date and announcement of the single was first confirmed on the online version of the Japanese Yomiuri news on September 21, 2008 and was first heard on the TBS television program Mino Monta no Asa Zuba (みのもんたの朝ズバッ！), a day later, as promotion for Ryūsei no Kizuna. The single was available for pre-order on online shopping sites on September 27, and the full song was heard for the first time on October 5 on Ninomiya's radio program, Baystorm. A short version of the music video was also aired on M-On before live promotions of the song, which started on the music program Hey! Hey! Hey! Music Champ on the November 3rd, which was the only television promotion before the single's release.

The single was listed on Japan Gold Disc Award's list of The Best 10 Singles of 2009. It was also named Best Theme Song in the 59th Television Drama Academy Awards.

== Chart performance ==
The single debuted at the top spot on the Oricon daily singles chart with total index sales figure of 83,052 (an estimated 145,341 copies sold on the first day), making it the group's 13th straight number one release and their 21st number one overall with a total of 351,860 copies sold in the first week. "Beautiful Days" also topped the ranking for music program Music Station's Ringtone Ranking.

By selling a total of 421,876 copies by the end of 2008, the single emerged as the tenth best-selling single of the year in Japan. The single is certified Double Platinum by the RIAJ for shipment of 500,000 copies.

== Track listing ==
Regular edition
No.	Title	Lyrics	Music	Arrangement	Length
1.	"Beautiful Days"	Takuya Harada	Harada	Ha-j	4:55
2.	"Boku ga Boku no Subete"	100+	Yūsuke Katō	Katō	4:31
3.	"Wasurerarenai"	Arika	Hikari	Hirofumi Sasaki	4:14
4.	"Beautiful Days" (Instrumental)	Harada	Harada	Ha-j	4:55
5.	"Boku ga Boku no Subete" (Instrumental)	100+	Katō	Katō	4:31
6.	"Wasurerarenai" (Instrumental, includes hidden talk track)	Arika	Hikari	Sasaki	38:35
Total length:					1:01:41

Limited edition
No.	Title	Lyrics	Music	Arrangement	Length
1.	"Beautiful Days"	Harada	Harada	Ha-j	4:55
2.	"Boku ga Boku no Subete"	100+	Katō	Katō	4:31
Total length:					9:26

Limited edition – DVD
No.	Title	Length
1.	"Beautiful Days" (Music video)

== Charts and certifications ==
=== Weekly charts ===
Chart (2008)	Peak position
Japan (Oricon Singles Chart)	1
Japan (Japan Hot 100)	1

=== Year-end charts ===
Chart (2008)	Peak position
Japan (Oricon Singles Chart)	10

=== Certifications ===
Region	Certification	Certified units/sales
Japan (RIAJ)	2× Platinum	421,876
