= One Love (Arashi song) =

Single by Arashi

from the album All the Best! 1999–2009
- B-side: "How to Fly"
- Released: June 25, 2008
- Genre: Pop
- Label: J Storm
- Songwriters: Youth Case; Yūsuke Katō

Arashi singles chronology
"Step and Go" (2008)	"One Love" (2008)	"Truth / Kaze no Mukō e" (2008)

Music video
- "One Love" on YouTube

"One Love" is the twenty-second single of the Japanese boy band, Arashi. The single was released in two editions: a regular edition containing the karaoke versions of all the songs released in the single, and a limited edition containing only the title track and a DVD of the music video. For the first time in Arashi's discography, a song remix of all the three Hana Yori Dango theme songs was included in the Limited Edition release. The single was later re-issued in commemoration of the success of Hana yori Dango Final: The Movie with an insert of two-minute dialogue by Arashi member Jun Matsumoto acting as his Hana Yori Dango character Tsukasa Dōmyōji.

"One Love" was included in the start of the Reborn project, as part of the Arashi Reborn Vol.1 extended play, released on February 28, 2020, together with A-ra-shi: Reborn, and A Day in Our Life: Reborn.

== Single information ==
"One Love" was used as the theme song for the movie Hana Yori Dango Final starring the cast of Hana Yori Dango. The single is considered the sequel to "Wish" and "Love So Sweet" as the singles were the theme songs for the dramas Hana Yori Dango and Hana Yori Dango 2, the prequels to Hana Yori Dango Final, respectively. The single was also listed on Japan Gold Disc Award's list of The Best 10 Singles of 2009.

=== Pre-release ===
Prior to its release, the working title of the song was "I Love You". The song was first heard on the television program Ōsama no Brunch on April 26, 2008, as background music during the broadcast of the preview of the Hana Yori Dango Final movie. To build anticipation for the upcoming single, the song was also included in the repertoire for the group's Arashi Marks 2008 Dream-A-Live concert tour, along with a new song entitled "Green". On May 18, the single was available for pre-order on online music store CDJapan, in which both versions topped the pre-order ranking. The limited edition was also sold out in the online store in two hours. The full song was aired on Matsumoto's radio program Jun Style on May 24, 2008.

== Chart performance ==
"One Love" debuted at the top spot on Oricon daily singles ranking with total index sales figure of 74,610 (130,568 estimated copies sold), and the weekly charts with sales in excess of 300,000 copies. The single is certified Double Platinum by the RIAJ for shipment of 500,000 copies.

It is tied with "Love So Sweet" in terms of the number of consecutive weeks in the Top 10, with 5, before falling out to the 14th spot in its sixth week in the chart. The single peaked to the second spot in the daily rankings in its seventh week and landing fifth in the ranking that week. It spent a total of eight weeks in the Top 10, longer than any Arashi single and a total of eleven weeks in the Top 30.

Selling a total of 524,269 copies by the end of 2008, it is the second best-selling single of 2008 in Japan, behind their twenty-third single "Truth/Kaze no Mukō e".

The song was Arashi's fourth to reach 100 million streams.

== Track listing ==
Regular edition
No.	Title	Lyrics	Music	Arrangement	Length
1.	"One Love"	Youth Case	Yūsuke Katō	Tomoki Ishizuka	4:47
2.	"How to Fly"	Unite	R.P.P.; Anders Wrethov	Taku Yoshioka	3:39
3.	"One Love" (instrumental)	Youth Case	Katō	Ishizuka	4:47
4.	"How to Fly" (instrumental)	Unite	R.P.P.; Wrethov	Yoshioka	3:39
Total length:					17:12

Limited edition
No.	Title	Lyrics	Music	Arrangement	Length
1.	"One Love"	Youth Case	Yūsuke Katō	Tomoki Ishizuka	4:46
2.	"Final Remix" (feat. Wish, Love So Sweet & One Love)				4:53
Total length:					9:39

Limited edition – DVD
No.	Title	Length
1.	"One Love" (Music video)

== Charts and certifications ==
=== Weekly charts ===
Chart (2008)	Peak position
Japan (Oricon Singles Chart)	1
Japan (Billboard Japan Hot 100)	1

=== Year-end charts ===
Chart (2008)	Peak position
Japan (Oricon Singles Chart)	2

=== Certifications ===
Region	Certification	Certified units/sales
Japan (RIAJ)	2× Platinum	524,269
