= Truth / Kaze no Mukō e =

"Truth/Kaze no Mukō e"

Single by Arashi

from the album All the Best! 1999–2009
- B-side: "Smile"
- Released: August 20, 2008
- Recorded: 2008
- Genre: Pop
- Label: J Storm

Arashi singles chronology
| "One Love" (2008) | "Truth/Kaze no Mukō e" (2008) | "Beautiful Days" (2008) |

Music video
- "Truth" on YouTube

"Truth/Kaze no Mukō e" (truth/風の向こうへ, Truth/Beyond the Wind) is a single released by Japanese boy band Arashi. It was released on August 20, 2008 by their record label J Storm. "Truth/Kaze no Mukō e" was released in three formats: a regular edition and two limited editions. The regular edition comes with a bonus track titled "Smile" (スマイル; "Sumairu") and the instrumentals of all the songs while the limited editions both come with a DVD.

== Single information ==
"Truth" was used as the theme song for Arashi member Satoshi Ohno's 2008 drama Maō while "Kaze no Mukō e" was used as the theme song for the news coverage of the 2008 Summer Olympics on NTV, featuring member Sho Sakurai as the main newscaster. In stark contrast to "Truth", which is a fast-paced dance number with a mood similar to the drama's setting and atmosphere, "Kaze no Mukō e" is a more upbeat pop song that, in tradition with other songs used by Japanese broadcasters for their respective Olympic coverage, tries to inspire athletes.

The single is the group's first double A-side single in four years since their 2004 "Hitomi no Naka no Galaxy/Hero" single and the regular edition for "Truth/Kaze no Mukō e" is the first since "Nice na Kokoroiki" not to have the members featured in the cover. The promotional video for "Kaze no Mukō e" premiered on August 8, 2008, in time for the opening ceremony of the Olympics. Prior to the video's release, news program News Zero ran a feature featuring Sakurai writing the rap lyrics and recording the song. Arashi also provided the theme song, "Hero", for the news coverage of the 2004 Olympic Games four years earlier on NTV.

In 2009, "Truth/Kaze no Mukō e" was listed as one of The Best 10 Singles in the 23rd Japan Gold Disc Award 2009 and also named the Single of the Year.

The songs were included in their official pages of streaming sites Apple Music, Spotify, and the such, in 2019.

== Music video ==
=== "Truth" ===
The music video begins with an orchestra of string instrumentalists such as violinists playing the introduction of "Truth". Arashi appears in front of orchestra dancing in red and black clothes. For the verses that are sung solo or in groups to two or three, a solo shot of the member singing his own respective part is shown while he is leaning against a concrete wall. The video continues to switch from shots of the orchestra to Arashi dancing in sync with the beat of the song and to solo shots of the members. In the closing, Ohno holds the white lily flower seen occasionally throughout the video. On in close-ups scene, they will formed in full and short Individual Fanservice solo versions in the future. A Close-ups Version also included in Blu-ray on the future next year. Music video directed by Hideaki Sunaga (須永秀明, Sunaga Hideaki)

"Truth"'s music video in high definition was included in their official YouTube channel, when it opened in 2019, and later on, also a live version.

=== "Kaze no Mukō e" ===
Directed by Hideaki Sunaga (須永秀明, Sunaga Hideaki), the music video begins with Sakurai with his hands clasped together. The video then moves on to show Arashi standing in a circle singing while the camera steadily spins around them. With each member wearing clothes in white and silver, the video transitions between the group circle and solo shots. During the rap portion of the song, Sakurai stands in the center of the circle. In the closing, an image of the sky is blended in with the video as Arashi sings the last two lines of the song.

== Chart performance ==
The single debuted at the top spot on the Oricon daily chart with total index sales figure of 119,227 (an estimated 208,647 copies sold), which surpassed the first day sales indexes for their previous singles released during the year ("Step and Go" with 107,689 copies sold and "One Love" with 130,567). Also during the single's week of release was the eighth and final week of "One Love" in the Oricon Top 10, the first time two Arashi singles charted in the weekly Top 10 at the same time. The single sold an estimated 467,288 copies in its first week, overtaking fellow Johnny's boy band KAT-TUN's first week sales of their seventh single "Don't U Ever Stop" of 381,672 copies, making it the biggest first week sales for a single in Japan in 2008.

Two months after its release, the single crossed the 600,000 mark, making it the first and only single of 2008 to do so. According to Oricon, "Truth/Kaze no Mukō e" is officially Japan's best-selling single of 2008. On January 1, 2009, "Truth" officially ranked at number seven on Billboard's Japan Hot 100 2008 Year-end list.

== Track listing ==
Regular edition
| No. | Title | Lyrics | Music | Arrangement | Length |
|---|---|---|---|---|---|
| 1. | "Truth" | Hydrant | Hydrant | Wataru Maeguchi | 4:50 |
| 2. | "Kaze no Mukō e" | Sho Sakurai; Shinya Tada | Pippi Svensson; Anders Dannvik | Hans Johnson | 3:40 |
| 3. | "Smile" | Erik Lidbom; Youth Case | Lidbom; Youth Case | Gin Kitagawa | 3:38 |
| 4. | "Truth" (Instrumental) | Hydrant | Hydrant | Maeguchi | 4:50 |
| 5. | "Kaze no Mukō e" (Instrumental) | Sakurai; Tada | Svensson; Dannvik | Johnson | 3:40 |
| 6. | "Smile" (Instrumental) | Lidbom; Youth Case | Lidbom; Youth Case | Kitagawa | 3:36 |
| Total length: | | | | | 24:14 |

Limited edition 1
| No. | Title | Lyrics | Music | Arrangement | Length |
|---|---|---|---|---|---|
| 1. | "Truth" | Hydrant | Hydrant | Maeguchi | 4:50 |
| 2. | "Kaze no Mukō e" | Sakurai; Tada | Svensson; Dannvik | Johnson | 3:40 |
| Total length: | | | | | 8:30 |

Limited edition 1 – DVD
| No. | Title | Length |
|---|---|---|
| 1. | "Truth" (Music video) |

Limited edition 2
| No. | Title | Lyrics | Music | Arrangement | Length |
|---|---|---|---|---|---|
| 1. | "Kaze no Mukō e" | Sakurai; Tada | Svensson; Dannvik | Johnson | 4:50 |
| 2. | "Truth" | Hydrant | Hydrant | Maeguchi | 3:40 |
| Total length: | | | | | 8:30 |

Limited edition 2 – DVD
| No. | Title | Length |
|---|---|---|
| 1. | "Kaze no Mukō e" (Music video) |

== Charts and certifications ==
=== Weekly charts ===
| Chart (2008) | Peak position |
|---|---|
| Japan (Oricon Singles Chart) | 1 |
| Japan (Billboard Japan Hot 100) (Note: Peak position for "Truth". "Kaze no Mukō e" peaked at number 69.) | 1 |
| Taiwan (G-Music) | 6 |
| Taiwan East Asian (G-Music) | 1 |

=== Year-end charts ===
| Chart (2008) | Peak position |
|---|---|
| Japan (Oricon Singles Chart) | 1 |

=== Certifications ===
| Region | Certification | Certified units/sales |
|---|---|---|
| Japan (RIAJ) | 2× Platinum | 618,229 |

== Release history ==
Release history and formats for "Truth" / "Kaze no Mukō e"
| Region | Date | Format | Label |
|---|---|---|---|
| Japan | August 20, 2008 | CD single (JACA-5113); CD+DVD (JACA-5109); CD+DVD (JACA-5111) | J Storm |
| Korea | August 27, 2008 | CD single (SMJTCD276); CD+DVD (SMJTCD274B); CD+DVD (SMJTCD275B) | SM Entertainment |
| Taiwan | September 5, 2008 | CD single (JAJSG27014); CD+DVD (JAJSG27014/A); CD+DVD (JAJSG27014/B) | Avex Taiwan |
| Hong Kong | September 8, 2008 | CD single CD+DVD; CD+DVD | Avex Asia |
