= Kimi no Tame ni Boku ga Iru =

Single by Arashi

from the album Arashi Single Collection 1999–2001
- B-side: "Hanasanai!"
- Released: April 18, 2001
- Genre: Pop
- Label: Pony Canyon; PCCJ-00005
- Songwriter(s): Kōhei Ōkura; Kōji Makaino

Arashi singles chronology
"Kansha Kangeki Ame Arashi" (2000)	"Kimi no Tame ni Boku ga Iru" (2001)	"Jidai" (2001)

"Kimi no Tame ni Boku ga Iru" (君のために僕がいる) is the fifth single of the Japanese boy band Arashi. The single was released in two editions. While both the regular edition and limited edition contains two songs and its instrumentals, only the limited edition included stickers and changeable disc covers. It was certified gold by the RIAJ for a shipment of 200,000 copies.

== Track listing ==
No.	Title	Lyrics	Music	Length
1.	"Kimi no Tame ni Boku ga Iru" (君のために僕がいる, "I'm Here Because of You")	Kōhei Ōkura	Kōji Makaino	3:46
2.	"Hanasanai!" (はなさない!, "I Won't Let Go!")	Emi Makiho	Seikō Nagaoka	5:02
3.	"Kimi no Tame ni Boku ga Iru" (instrumental)	Ōkura	Makaino	3:46
4.	"Hanasanai!" (instrumental)	Makiho	Nagaoka	5:02
Total length:				17:36

== Charts ==
Chart (2001)	Peak position
Japan Oricon Weekly Singles Chart	1
