= Arashi (song) =

Single by Arashi

from the album Arashi No.1 Ichigou: Arashi wa Arashi o Yobu!
- B-side: "Ashita ni Mukatte"
- Released: November 3, 1999
- Recorded: 1999
- Genre: Pop, rock
- Length: 18:08
- Label: Pony Canyon
- Songwriter(s): J&T, Kōji Makaino

Arashi singles chronology
"Arashi" (1999)	"Sunrise Nippon / Horizon" (2000)

Music video
- "A・RA・SHI" on YouTube

"Arashi" (stylized as A・RA・SHI) is a song recorded by the Japanese boy band of the same name. It was released on November 3, 1999, by the record label Pony Canyon as the band's first single. "Arashi" was used as the theme song for Arashi's mini-drama V no Arashi (Vの嵐) and for the 8th World Cup of Volleyball hosted by Japan in 1999, featuring the group as supporters. While both the regular and limited editions were released as a CD single containing two songs and its instrumentals, only the limited edition included a poster.

A new version of "Arashi", A-ra-shi: Reborn, was released on December 20, 2019, as a single in the start of the Reborn project. A-ra-shi: Reborn was later included in the Arashi Reborn Vol.1 extended play, released on February 28, 2020, together with A Day in Our Life: Reborn, and One Love: Reborn.

== Single information ==
When it was released, an estimated 80,000 fans showed up to attend the single's debut event. In 2006, its chorus ("You are my soul! Soul!") was the name of the band's South Korea concert, You Are My Seoul, Soul.

The song's music video was included in their official YouTube channel, when it opened in 2019, and later on, also a live version. The song was also included in their official pages of streaming sites Apple Music, Spotify, and the such.

== Track list ==
All music is composed by Kōji Makaino.

No.	Title	Lyrics	Length
1.	"Arashi"	J&T	4:26
2.	"Ashita ni Mukatte" (明日に向かって, "Facing Tomorrow")	Yūzō Ōtsuka	4:32
3.	"Arashi" (instrumental)		4:26
4.	"Ashita ni Mukatte" (instrumental)		4:32
Total length:			18:08

== Chart performance ==
Selling over 557,000 in its first week and over 970,000 copies by the end of its chart run, the single is the group's best-selling single. The single was certified double platinum in Japan for a shipment of 800,000 copies.

As of July 23, 2025, the song's video reached the hundred million mark, with 100,499,595 views, making it the 6th video in reaching the milestone.

== Charts and certifications ==
=== Weekly charts ===
Chart (1999–2019)	Peak position
Japan (Oricon Singles Chart)	1
Japan (Count Down TV)	1
Japan (Billboard Japan Hot 100)	21

=== Year-end charts ===
Chart (1999)	Position
Japan (Oricon Singles Chart)	23
Japan (Count Down TV)	16

=== Sales and certifications ===
Region	Certification	Certified units/sales
Japan (RIAJ)	2× Platinum	973,000

== Release history ==
Release history and formats for "Arashi"
Region	Date	Format	Version	Label	Ref.
Japan	November 3, 1999	CD (PCDJ-00001)	Original	Pony Canyon	
Japan	October 16, 2019	Streaming	Original	J Storm	
Various	October 16, 2019	Streaming	Original	J Storm	
Various	October 22, 2019	Streaming	Live	J Storm	
