= A Day in Our Life =

"a Day in Our Life"

Single by Arashi

from the album Here We Go!
- Released: 6 February 2002
- Genre: Hip hop
- Length: 4:41
- Label: J Storm
- Songwriter(s): Shun, Shuya

Arashi singles chronology
"Jidai" (2001)	"a Day in Our Life" (2002)	"Nice na Kokoroiki" (2002)

"A Day in Our Life" (stylized as "a Day in Our Life") is a song by Japanese boy band Arashi. It was released on 6 February 2002, as their seventh single, and first single to be released through their new record label J Storm. It reached number one on the Oricon Singles Chart. The single was certified platinum by the Recording Industry Association of Japan in April 2002 for shipments of over 400,000 copies.

"A Day in Our Life" was included in the start of the Reborn project, as part of the Arashi Reborn Vol.1 extended play, released on February 28, 2020, together with A-ra-shi: Reborn, and One Love: Reborn.

== Background and release ==
"A Day in Our Life" was used as the theme song for the television series Kisarazu Cat's Eye starring member Sho Sakurai. The song was also used as the theme song for a TBS variety show, USO!? Japan, which featured all members of Arashi. The song was written by Shun and Shuya of Sukebo King. It samples "ABC" by Shonentai. The song was released as a CD single on 6 February 2002, through the group's new record label J Storm. It was released in one edition.

== Reception ==
A reviewer from CD Journal gave the song a positive review, stating that "the exchange between rap and vocals is exquisite".

=== Commercial performance ===
"A Day in Our Life" debuted at number one on the Oricon Singles Chart, selling 226,000 copies in its first week. It charted for eleven weeks and went on to sell over 378,000 copies, making it the 21st best-selling single of that year in Japan. In April 2002, the single was certified platinum by the Recording Industry Association of Japan for shipments of over 400,000.

== Track listing ==
All tracks are written by Shun and Shuya

No.	Title	Length
1.	"A Day in Our Life"	4:41
2.	"A Day in Our Life" (instrumental)	4:41

== Charts ==
Chart (2002)	Peak position
Japanese Singles (Oricon)	1
