= Typhoon Generation =

Single by Arashi

from the album Arashi No.1 Ichigou: Arashi wa Arashi o Yobu!
- B-side: "Asu ni Mukatte Hoero"
- Released: July 12, 2000
- Recorded: 2000
- Genre: Pop, rock
- Length: 20:47
- Label: Pony Canyon

Arashi singles chronology
"Sunrise Nippon / Horizon" (2000)	"Typhoon Generation" (2000)	"Kansha Kangeki Ame Arashi" (2000)

"Typhoon Generation" (台風ジェネレーション, Taifuu Jenerēshon) is a song recorded by Japanese boy band Arashi. It was released on July 12, 2000, by the record label Pony Canyon. While both the regular and limited editions were released as a CD single containing two songs and its instrumentals, only the limited edition included a poster. The song sold 256,510 copies, debuting at number three on the Oricon weekly singles chart.

== Music video ==
The music video begins in sepia tone, with the band, wearing leather jackets and assorted greaser wear, sitting in an alley while singing the song. As it reaches its first chorus, they stand up and sing directly to the camera.

As the song changes to its faster-paced latter half, the scene transitions to the band, now wearing loose-fitting and colorful casual clothes, performing dance routines in a brightly lit white and blue studio. Intercut are scenes of the band singing in a darker hallway with mirrored walls.

== Track listing ==
No.	Title	Lyrics	Music	Arrangement	Length
1.	"Typhoon Generation"	Yōji Kubota	Kōji Makaino	Naoki Ōtsubo	4:59
2.	"Asu ni Mukatte Hoero" (明日に向かって吠えろ "Face and Roar at Tomorrow")	Maria Kuze	Shin Tanimoto	Chokkaku	5:19
3.	"Typhoon Generation" (Instrumental)	Kubota	Makaino	Ōtsubo	4:59
4.	"Asu ni Mukatte Hoero" (Instrumental)	Kuze	Tanimoto	Chokkaku	5:19

== Charts and certifications ==
=== Weekly charts ===
Chart (2000)	Peak position
Japan (Oricon Singles Chart)	3
Japan (Count Down TV)	2

=== Year-end charts ===
Chart (2000)	Position
Japan (Oricon Singles Chart)	73
Japan (Count Down TV)	72

=== Sales and certifications ===
Region	Certification	Certified units/sales
Japan (RIAJ)	Platinum	400,000^{^}
^{^} Shipments figures based on certification alone.
