= Jidai (Arashi song) =

Single by Arashi

from the album Arashi Single Collection 1999–2001
- B-side: "Koi wa Breakin'"
- Released: August 1, 2001
- Genre: Rap rock
- Label: Pony Canyon
- Songwriter(s): Tsukasa

Arashi singles chronology
"Kimi no Tame ni Boku ga Iru" (2000)	"Jidai" (2001)	"A Day in Our Life" (2002)

"Jidai" (時代, Era) is the sixth single of the Japanese boy band Arashi. The single was released in two editions. While both the regular edition and limited edition contains two songs and its instrumentals, the two have different covers and only the limited edition included cards and a poster. It was certified platinum by the RIAJ for a shipment of 400,000 copies.

== Content ==
"Jidai" was used as the theme song for the drama Kindaichi Shonen no Jikenbo 3 starring Arashi member Jun Matsumoto in his first lead role. The single is also the last single to be released under the Pony Canyon label before the group moved to their private label J Storm by the end of 2001. On September 19, 2001, "Jidai" was named Best Theme Song in the 30th Television Drama Academy Awards.

== Track listing ==
All track arrangements done by Chokkaku

No.	Title	Lyrics	Music	Length
1.	"Jidai" (時代, "Era")	Tsukasa	Tsukasa	4:52
2.	"Koi wa Breakin'" (恋はブレッキー, "Love is Breakin'")	Maria Kuze	Kōji Makaino	4:33
3.	"Jidai" (instrumental)	Tsukasa	Tsukasa	4:52
4.	"Koi wa Breakin'" (instrumental)	Kuze	Makaino	4:33
Total length:				19:05

== Charts ==
Chart (2001)	Peak position
Japan Oricon Weekly Singles Chart	1
Japan Oricon Yearly Singles Chart	48
