= Sunrise Nippon / Horizon =

"Sunrise Nippon/Horizon"

Single by Arashi

from the album Arashi No.1 Ichigou: Arashi wa Arashi o Yobu!
- Language: Japanese
- Released: April 5, 2000
- Recorded: 2000
- Genre: Pop; rock
- Length: 19:50
- Label: J Storm
- Songwriters: F&T; Kōji Makaino; Takeshi; Shin Tanimoto

Arashi singles chronology
"Arashi" (1999)	"Sunrise Nippon/Horizon" (2000)	"Typhoon Generation" (2000)

"Sunrise Nippon/Horizon" (Sunrise日本／Horizon; "Sunrise Japan/Horizon") is the second single and first double A-side single by Japanese boy band Arashi. The single was released on April 5, 2000 in two editions. While both the regular edition and limited edition contains two songs and its instrumentals, only the limited edition was released in the shape of a flying disc and included a set of round stickers. It reached number one on the Oricon Singles Chart and was certified platinum by the Recording Industry Association of Japan for shipments of 400,000 copies.

== Single information ==
"Sunrise Nippon" was covered by Eurobeat Lovers in Dancemania Presents JParadise and quoted in the drama Ikebukuro West Gate Park. Although both "Sunrise Nippon" and "Horizon" are A-side songs, only "Sunrise Nippon" has a music video.

== Composition ==
"Sunrise Nippon" was written by F&T and Kōji Makaino, and arranged by Chokkaku. Musically, "Sunrise Nippon" is a pop song with a "groovy bass line" and "cheerful, funky melody". "Horizon" was written by Takeshi and Shin Tanimoto, and arranged by Hitoshi Munakata and Naoki Hayashibe. CD Journal described "Horizon" as an aggressive rock song with loud guitar.

== Track listing ==
No.	Title	Lyrics	Music	Arrangement	Length
1.	"Sunrise Nippon"	F&T	Kōji Makaino	Chokkaku	4:43
2.	"Horizon"	Takeshi	Shin Tanimoto	Hitoshi Munakata; Naoki Hayashibe	5:07
3.	"Sunrise Nippon" (instrumental)	F&T	Makaino	Chokkaku	4:43
4.	"Horizon" (instrumental)	Takeshi	Tanimoto	Munakata; Hayashibe	5:07
Total length:					19:50

== Charts and certifications ==
=== Charts ===
Chart (2000)	Peak position
Japan Oricon Weekly Singles Chart	1
Japan Oricon Monthly Singles Chart	1

=== Sales and certifications ===
Country	Provider	Sales	Certification
Japan	RIAJ	304,340	Platinum

== Release history ==
Release history and formats for "Sunrise Nippon" / "Horizon"
Region	Date	Format	Label
Japan	April 5, 2000	CD (PCCJ-00001)	Pony Canyon
