= Kansha Kangeki Ame Arashi =

Single by Arashi

Single by Arashi

from the album Arashi No.1 Ichigou: Arashi wa Arashi o Yobu!
- B-side: "Ok! All Right! Ii Koi Wo Shiyō"
- Released: November 8, 2000 (Japan)
- Genre: Pop
- Label: Pony Canyon; PCCJ-00003
- Songwriter(s): Masami Tozawa; Kōji Makaino

Arashi singles chronology
"Typhoon Generation" (2000)	"Kansha Kangeki Ame Arashi" (2000)	"Kimi no Tame ni Boku ga Iru" (2001)

"Kansha Kangeki Ame Arashi" (感謝カンゲキ雨嵐) is a song by Japanese boy band Arashi from their debut studio album Arashi No.1 Ichigou: Arashi wa Arashi o Yobu! (2001). It was released on November 8, 2000, by Pony Canyon as their fourth single. The single was released in two editions. While both the regular edition and limited edition contains two songs and its instrumentals, the two have different covers and only the limited edition included a set of stickers.

"Kansha Kangeki Ame Arashi" debuted at number two on the Oricon Singles Chart, and was certified Platinum by the Recording Industry Association of Japan for shipment of 400,000 copies.

== Single information ==
"Kansha Kangeki Ame Arashi" was used as the theme song for the drama Namida o Fuite starring Yōsuke Eguchi, Arashi member Kazunari Ninomiya, Yuki Uchida and Aya Ueto.

"Kansha Kangeki Ame Arashi" means "to be very grateful". The comes from the phrase "Kansha Kangeki Ame Arare" (感謝感激雨霰, barrage of deep gratitude), which is a play on the war time phrase "Ransha Rangeki Ame Arare" (乱射乱撃雨霰, blindly firing a barrage of bullets).

== Track listing ==
All tracks arranged by Chokkaku.

No.	Title	Lyrics	Music	Length
1.	"Kansha Kangeki Ame Arashi" (感謝カンゲキ雨嵐 "Storm of Deep Gratitude")	Masami Tozawa	Kōji Makaino	4:50
2.	"OK! All Right! Ii Koi o Shiyō" (OK! ALL RIGHT! いい恋をしよう " – Let's Make Good Love")	Yōji Kubota	Shin Tanimoto	4:36
3.	"Kansha Kangeki Ame Arashi" (Instrumental)	Tozawa	Makaino	4:50
4.	"OK! All Right! Ii Koi o Shiyō" (Instrumental)	Kubota	Tanimoto	4:36

== Charts ==
=== Weekly charts ===
Chart (2000–2019)	Peak position
Japan (Oricon Singles Chart)	2
Japan (Billboard Japan Hot 100	51

=== Certifications ===
Region	Certification	Certified units/sales
Japan (RIAJ)	Platinum	400,000^{^}
^{^} Shipments figures based on certification alone.
