= Summer Tour 2007 Final Time – Kotoba no Chikara =

Summer Tour 2007 Final Time: Kotoba no Chikara

Video by Arashi
- Released: April 16, 2008
- Recorded: October 8, 2007
- Genre: Pop, rock, hip hop
- Label: J Storm

Arashi chronology
| Arashi Around Asia + in Dome (2007) | Summer Tour 2007 Final Time: Kotoba no Chikara (2008) | Arashi Around Asia 2008 in Tokyo (2009) |

Summer Tour 2007 Final Time: Kotoba no Chikara (Summer Tour 2007 Final Time -コトバノチカラ-, Summer Tour 2007 Final Time: The Power of Words) is a DVD release of Japanese boy band Arashi. It was released on April 16, 2008 by their record label J Storm. Summer Tour 2007 Final Time: Kotoba no Chikara documented Arashi's summer concert at Tokyo Dome in correspondence with their Time album.

== History and highlights ==
The DVD was recorded at their Tokyo Dome concert on October 8, 2007. Footages of Arashi's "Fight Song" performance while bungee jumping for their concert at Yokohama Arena (July 13, 2007) were also included in Disc 2.

== Contents ==
=== Disc 1 ===
1. "Overture"
2. "Everybody Zenshin" (Everybody前進; "Everybody Advance")
3. "Di-Li-Li"
4. "Kitto Daijoubu"
5. "Oh Yeah!"
6. "Friendship" (Masaki Aiba solo)
7. "Can't Let You Go" (Sho Sakurai solo)
8. "Jidai"
9. "Yes? No?"
10. "Carnival Night Part 2"
11. "Niji" (虹; "Rainbow") (Kazunari Ninomiya solo)
12. "Taiyō no Sekai" (太陽の世界; "Sun World")
13. "Wave"
14. "Love Situation"
15. "A Day in Our Life"
16. "Hadashi no Mirai"
17. "Hero"
18. "Yabai-Yabai-Yabai" (Jun Matsumoto solo)
19. "Song For Me" (Satoshi Ohno solo)
20. "Cry For You"
21. "Kotoba Yori Taisetsu na Mono"
22. "Kansha Kangeki Ame Arashi"
23. "Kimi no Tame ni Boku ga Iru"
24. "Pikanchi Double"
25. "Arashi"
26. "Sakura Sake"
27. "Be With You"
28. "Happiness"

=== Disc 2 ===
1. Encore 1: "We Can Make It!", "Fight Song" (ファイトソング; "Faito Songu"), "Wish", "Love So Sweet"
2. Encore 2: "Future", "Rock You"
3. Encore 3: "Na! Na! Na!!", "Kansha Kangeki Ame Arashi"
4. MC (featuring Hey! Say! JUMP), Ura Arashi song: "Kaze" (風, Wind)
5. Special Feature: "Fight Song" at Yokohama Arena on July 31, 2007

== Charts and certifications ==
=== Charts ===
| Chart (2008) | Peak position |
|---|---|
| Japan Oricon Weekly Music DVD Chart | 1 |
| Japan Oricon Yearly Music DVD Chart | 2 |
| Japan Oricon Yearly General DVD Chart | 6 |

=== Sales and certifications ===
| Country | Provider | Sales | Certification |
|---|---|---|---|
| Japan | RIAJ | 243,913 | Platinum |

== Awards ==
- The DVD was listed as one of the Music Videos Of The Year for the 23rd Japan Gold Disc Awards.
