= Arashi Around Asia 2008 in Tokyo =

Video by Arashi
- Released: March 25, 2009
- Recorded: September 6, 2008
- Genres: Pop, rock, hip hop
- Length: 3 hours, 30 minutes
- Label: J Storm

Arashi chronology
Summer Tour 2007 Final Time: Kotoba no Chikara (2008)	Arashi Around Asia 2008 in Tokyo (2009)	5x10 All the Best! Clips 1999–2009 (2009)

Arashi Around Asia 2008 in Tokyo is a DVD release of the Japanese boy band Arashi. It was released on March 25, 2009, by their record label J Storm. Arashi Around Asia 2008 in Tokyo documented the second day (September 6, 2008) of Arashi's first concert at the National Stadium in Tokyo.

== Concert tour ==
Arashi Marks Arashi Around Asia 2008
- Tour by Arashi
- Start date: September 5, 2008
- End date: November 16, 2008
- Legs: 4
- No. of shows: 8

Arashi concert chronology
- Arashi Marks 2008 Dream-A-Live (2008); Arashi Marks Arashi Around Asia 2008 (2008); Arashi Anniversary Tour 5x10 (2009—2010)

=== Tour information ===
During the group's performance in Tokyo Dome on June 15, 2008, it was announced that they would hold their second Asia Tour by the end of the year. Titled Arashi Marks Arashi Around Asia 2008, the tour began at the National Stadium in Tokyo, where the group became the third musical act after SMAP and Dreams Come True to hold concerts there. The tour then continued to Seoul, Taipei and Shanghai, a Johnny & Associates first.

=== Tour dates ===
- September 5: Tokyo, Japan
- September 6: Tokyo, Japan
- October 11: Taipei, Taiwan
- October 12: Taipei, Taiwan
- November 1: Seoul, Korea
- November 2: Seoul, Korea
- November 15: Shanghai, China
- November 16: Shanghai, China

== Set list ==
Special Footage

1. Arashi's Fight in Kokuritsu

Set list

1. "Overture"
2. "Love So Sweet"
3. "Oh Yeah!"
4. "Kitto Daijōbu"
5. "La Tormenta 2004"
6. "Happiness"
7. "Hadashi no Mirai"
8. "Aozora Pedal"
9. "Hello Goodbye" (Masaki Aiba solo)
10. "Subarashiki Sekai"
11. "Tomadoi Nagara"
12. "Still..."
13. "Lucky Man"
14. "Take Me Faraway" (Satoshi Ohno solo)
15. "Niji" (Kazunari Ninomiya solo)
16. "Smile"
17. "Wave"
18. "Carnival Night Part 2"
19. MC
20. "Kaze no Mukō e"
21. "Re(mark)able"
22. "Truth"
23. "Step and Go"
24. "A Day in Our Life"
25. "Tell Me What You Wanna Be?" (Jun Matsumoto solo)
26. "Ichioku No Hoshi"
27. "Sirius"
28. "Hip Pop Boogie" (Sho Sakurai solo)
29. "Arashi"
30. "Pikanchi Double"
31. "Asu Ni Mukatte Hoeru"
32. "One Love"

Encore 1

1. "Kansha Kangeki Ame Arashi"
2. "Fight Song"
3. "Kaze"
4. "Kotoba Yori Taisetsu na Mono"

Encore 2

1. "Sakura Sake"
2. "Wish"
3. "Gori Muchu"

== Chart performance ==
The DVD sold 230,000 copies in its first week and held the record for highest first week sales of 2009 until the release of the group's music video collection DVD 5x10 All the Best! Clips 1999–2009 on October 28, 2009. It is also the fourth in history for first week sales among music DVDs to date (behind their own 5x10 All the Best! Clips 1999–2009 of 428,000, KAT-TUN's Real Face Film of 374,000 and SMAP's Live MIJ of 281,000), the first DVD to top the comprehensive sales category for three consecutive weeks, and the first music DVD in history to hold the number one spot in the first half of the year in Japan.

By the end of 2009, Oricon announced that the DVD was the second best-selling music DVD of the year in Japan, right after 5x10 All the Best! Clips 1999–2009.

In 2010, Arashi Around Asia 2008 in Tokyo sold another 85,453 copies, making it the thirty-eighth best-selling DVD overall for 2010 in Japan.

== Charts and certifications ==
=== Charts ===
Chart (2009)	Peak position
Japan Oricon Weekly Music DVD Chart	1
Japan Oricon Yearly Music DVD Chart	2
Japan Oricon Yearly Comprehensive DVD Chart	3
Chart (2010)	Peak position
Japan Oricon Yearly Comprehensive DVD Chart	38

=== Sales and certifications ===
Country	Provider	Sales	Certification
Japan	RIAJ	428,256	Platinum

== Release history ==
Region	Date	Format	Distributor
Japan	March 25, 2009	DVD (JABA-5046)	J Storm
South Korea	April 8, 2009	DVD (SMDVD031)	SM Entertainment
Taiwan	April 24, 2009	DVD (JAJDV57018/9)	Avex Taiwan
Hong Kong	April 29, 2009	DVD	Avex Asia

== Awards ==
=== Japan Gold Disc Awards ===
Year	Nominee / work	Award	Result
2010	Arashi Around Asia 2008 in Tokyo	The Best Music Videos	Won
