= Time (Arashi album) =

Studio album by Arashi
- Released: July 11, 2007
- Genre: Pop, R&B, rock
- Length: 57:29 (Regular edition); 62:38 (Limited edition)
- Label: J Storm

Arashi chronology
Arashic (2006)	Time (2007)	Dream "A" Live (2008)

Singles from Time
- 1. "Aozora Pedal" Released: August 2, 2006; 2. "Love So Sweet" Released: February 12, 2007; 3. "We Can Make It!" Released: May 2, 2007

Time is the seventh studio album by Japanese boy band Arashi. The album was released on July 11, 2007, in Japan under their record label J Storm in two editions: a limited 2CD version and a regular CD version. The album was released digitally on February 7, 2020.

== Content ==
The regular edition contains a bonus track while the limited edition includes a second CD containing a solo song from each of the members of the group, the first time since the release of the album One in 2005. The album contains the singles "Aozora Pedal", "Love So Sweet" (the theme song to the Japanese television drama Hana Yori Dango 2) and "We Can Make It!" (the theme song to the drama Bambino!).

== Commercial performance ==
With first week sales of about 191,000 copies sold, the album went on to sell a total of 296,231 copies by the end of the year, making it the 41st best-selling album of 2007.

== Track listing ==
No.	Title	Lyrics	Music	Arrangement	Length
1.	"Oh Yeah!"	Unite	Kazunari Ohno	Gin Kitagawa	4:41
2.	"Love So Sweet"	Spin	Youth Case	Mugen	4:50
3.	"Wave"	Unite; Sho Sakurai	Erik Lidbom	Jun Abe	3:48
4.	"We Can Make It!"	Unite; Sakurai	Fredrik Thomander; Anders Wikström	Masaya Suzuki	4:10
5.	"Firefly"	Makoto Atozi; Sakurai	Yasushi Sasamoto	Sasamoto	3:50
6.	"Taiyō no Sekai"	Hydrant; Sakurai	Hydrant	Naoki Ōtsubo	4:42
7.	"Carry On"	Chokkyū Murano	Masayuki Iwata	Iwata	4:15
8.	"Rock You"	Youth Case; Sakurai	Takuya Harada	Harada	4:08
9.	"Cry For You"	Axel G; Sakurai	Jörgen Ringqvist; Jakob Ringbom	Ha-j	3:56
10.	"Love Situation"	Miyuki Hashimoto	Shinnosuke	Shinnosuke	4:06
11.	"Kaze"	Spin; Sakurai	Shinya Tada	Naoki-T	4:19
12.	"Be With You"	Masataka Kitaura	Kitaura	Ha-j	5:08
13.	"Life"	Tomokazu Miura; Sakurai	Ohno	Tomoki Ishizuka	5:03
14.	"Aozora Pedal"	Shikao Suga	Suga	Ishizuka	5:21
15.	"Everybody Zenshin" (Regular edition only)	Yōji Kubota	Shusui; Stefan Åberg	Shusui; Åberg	4:08
Total length:					66:25

Limited edition – CD 2
No.	Title	Lyrics	Music	Arrangement	Length
1.	"Song For Me" (Satoshi Ohno solo)	R.P.P	R.P.P	R.P.P	4:21
2.	"Friendship" (Masaki Aiba solo)	Yūya Abe	Yūya Abe	Atsushi Yuasa	4:36
3.	"Niji" (Kazunari Ninomiya solo)	Kazunari Ninomiya	Tada	Yoshinao Mikami	4:27
4.	"Can't Let You Go" (Sho Sakurai solo)	Daisuke Mori; Sakurai	Mori	Taku Yoshioka	4:26
5.	"Yabai-Yabai-Yabai" (Jun Matsumoto solo)	Harada	Harada	Harada	3:52
Total length:					84:14

== Charts ==
=== Weekly charts ===
Chart (2007)	Peak position
Japanese Albums (Oricon)	1

=== Year-end charts ===
Chart (2007)	Peak position
Japanese Albums (Oricon)	41

== Certifications ==
Country	Provider	Sales	Certification
Japan	RIAJ	190,870	Platinum

== Release history ==
Release history and formats for Time
Country	Date	Label	Format	Catalog
Japan	July 11, 2007	J Storm	CD	JACA-5066
Japan	July 11, 2007	J Storm	2CD	JACA-5064
Korea	July 25, 2007	SM Entertainment	CD	SMJTCD205
Korea	July 25, 2007	SM Entertainment	2CD	M000234391
Taiwan	July 28, 2007	Avex Taiwan	CD	JAJCD26003
Taiwan	July 28, 2007	Avex Taiwan	2CD	JAJCD26003/A
Hong Kong	July 28, 2007	Avex Asia	CD	
Hong Kong	July 28, 2007	Avex Asia	2CD	
