= We Can Make It! =

Single by Arashi

from the album Time
- B-side: "Di-Li-Li"; "Future"
- Released: May 2, 2007
- Genre: Pop
- Label: J Storm
- Songwriter(s): Unite; Sho Sakurai; Fredrik Thomander; Anders Wikström

Arashi singles chronology
"Love So Sweet" (2007)	"We Can Make It!" (2007)	"Happiness" (2007)

"We Can Make It!" is the nineteenth single by Japanese boy band Arashi. The single was released on May 2, 2007 through J Storm. It was included in the band's seventh studio album Time (2007). "We Can Make It" is a cover of "Love Is All Around" by Swedish singer Agnes Carlsson. The single reached number one on the Oricon Singles Chart and was certified Gold by the Recording Industry Association of Japan.

== Single information ==
"We Can Make It!" was used as the theme song for the television series Bambino! starring Arashi member Jun Matsumoto, making the single the Third consecutive single for a television series starring Matsumoto (the first being "Wish"). "We Can Make It" is a cover of "Love Is All Around" by Swedish singer Agnes Carlsson. It features the same melody, but with different lyrics and a rap part. The B-side "Di-Li-Li" was used as the campaign song for House Foods' "C1000 Lemon Water" commercial.

"We Can Make It!" was released in two editions: a regular edition containing the karaoke versions of the songs released in the single, and a limited edition containing a bonus track and a set of cards enclosed in a clear plastic sleeve that served as the cover art.

== Track listing ==
All track arrangements done by Suzuki Masaya, except where noted.

Regular edition
No.	Title	Lyrics	Music	Length
1.	"We Can Make It!"	Sho Sakurai; Unite	Fredrik Thomander; Anders Wikström	4:10
2.	"Di-Li-Li"	Sakurai; Gyo Kitagawa	Kitagawa	4:16
3.	"We Can Make It!" (instrumental)	Sakurai; Unite	Thomander; Wikström	4:10
4.	"Di-Li-Li" (instrumental)	Sakurai; Kitagawa	Kitagawa	4:14
Total length:				16:50

Limited edition
No.	Title	Lyrics	Music	Arrangement	Length
1.	"We Can Make It!"	Sakurai; Unite	Thomander; Wikström		4:10
2.	"Di-Li-Li"	Sakurai; Kitagawa	Kitagawa		4:16
3.	"Future"	Sakurai; 100+	100+	Ha-j	3:41
Total length:					12:02

== Charts and certifications ==
=== Charts ===
Chart (2007)	Peak position
Japan Oricon Weekly Singles Chart	1
Japan Oricon Monthly Singles Chart	2
Japan Oricon Yearly Singles Chart	27

=== Certifications ===
Country	Provider	Sales	Certification
Japan	RIAJ	204,775	Gold

== Release history ==
Region	Date
Japan	May 2, 2007
Taiwan	May 16, 2007
South Korea	May 16, 2007
Hong Kong	May 21, 2007
