= D no Arashi =

- Genre: Variety show
- Directed by: Shinsuke Miura
- Presented by: Arashi
- Narrated by: Kiyoshi Kobayashi
- Opening theme: "Fever" by Patti Drew
- Country of origin: Japan
- Original language: Japanese
- No. of episodes: 116

Production
- Producers: Toshio Matsuzaki; Yuko Iizuka; Kenji Suga
- Running time: 30 minutes

Original release
- Network: Nippon TV
- Release: July 2, 2003 – September 28, 2005

Related
- C no Arashi!; G no Arashi!

D no Arashi (Dの嵐!, Document Press Arashi!) was a Japanese variety show hosted by boy band Arashi. It ran from July 2, 2003 to September 28, 2005 on Nippon Television. It aired every Wednesday from 24:50 to 25:20 (JST). D no Arashi! was Arashi's fifth variety show to be aired on NTV, and the second in the CxDxG no Arashi! series.

== History ==
D no Arashi! began in March 2003 as a segment of C no Arashi!, a show where Arashi handled claims on behalf of various companies and organisations in Japan. In the pilot episode, Sakurai reported on a student with all 1's (the lowest score) on his report card. The title of the next series, G no Arashi, was decided by playing darts in the final episode.

In Document Press Arashi, at least one member acted as a reporter and documented various topics. In October 2004, the show was revamped into a "Fool's Curiosity" competition. Arashi split into one MC and two teams of two and tried to pique a special guest's curiosity with unusual experiments, information, and interviews.

== Segments ==
There were eight segments (or corners) in D no Arashi, six of which were member segments. Each member had their own corner on the show where they would lead the other members or introduce a topic.

=== T no Arashi! ===
"T no Arashi! (provisional title)" was Sho Sakurai's corner. The "T" stood for Tōkō (投稿, submissions). Sakurai would introduce supposedly unbelievable pictures of things, such as strange bus stops, submitted by viewers of the show.

Corner guide
Air date	Topic
2003-07-23	Bus stops
2003-08-06	Bus stops
2003-09-10	Enormous things
2003-09-17	Enormous things
2003-09-24	Looking at things at a different angle
2003-09-24	Bus stops
2003-10-15	Stations
2003-10-22	Menus
2004-01-21	Toilets
2004-03-10	Short things
2004-05-19	Things that make you think "Is this real?"
2004-09-08	Horror pictures
2005-02-16	Magazines

=== C no Arashi ===
Different from their preceding show's concept, the "C" stood for "Contest" instead of "Claim". With themes such as person with the longest tongue or person who is most flexible, the members of Arashi would watch each contestant demonstrate and vote for who they thought was the best.

Corner guide
Air date	Contest
2003-10-29	Strangest adult voice that did not break
2003-10-29	Best natural perm
2003-12-24	Most flexible body
2003-12-24	Skinniest body
2004-03-31	Most idiotic face
2004-03-31	Most dramatic difference between face with and without make-up
2004-06-09	Longest tongue
2004-06-09	Best death scene
2004-06-23	Most dramatic difference between former yankees before and after rehabilitation.
2004-08-11	Longest tongue

=== A no Arashi! ===
Masaki Aiba's corner. Aiba would propose, often pointless, experiments for the other members of Arashi to try out.

Corner guide
Air date	Experiments
2003-11-19	What will happen if you put a rubber ball, a rose, toothpaste, an egg, tofu and ramen into liquid nitrogen?
2003-11-19	What will happen if you drop a heated pachinko ball into a block of ice?
2003-11-19	If you equally mix pepper and sugar in water, will it taste spicy or sweet?
2003-12-03	How many meters is the limit of drinking from a straw?
2003-12-17	What will happen to a chameleon's skin if you leave it in the dark?
2004-01-14	Is it possible for a person to be lifted up into the air using balloons?
2004-01-21	What will happen if you pour water, honey, oil and ice into a container? Will it stay in that order?
2004-01-21	Why is it when you pour oil into a large container with a small container inside, the small container becomes invisible?
2004-03-03	Will the motorbike courier walk or use his motorbike if you request for a package delivery to the building right next door?
2004-04-21	How long will it take for instant noodles to cook in cold water?
2004-05-19	What will happen if you filter coffee, tea and orange juice through a water purifier?
2004-05-19	If you place a heater near an electric fan, will the wind become warm?
2004-05-19	What will happen if you throw a cream pie at a fencing mask?
2004-05-19	What will happen if you wrap a cold compress around a canned drink?
2004-07-28	If you place a boombox into a bag of helium, will the sound change?
2004-07-28	Will a cymbal-banging monkey toy be able to crack open an egg?
2004-07-28	Will the kettle whistle if you put dry ice in instead of water?
2004-07-28	What will happen if you put dry ice into syrup?
2004-07-28	What is the taste of sugar after drinking lemon juice and licking salt and pepper?
2004-07-28	Is it possible to make an "A" on the human body using hot and cold plasters?
2004-09-01	Can a vacuum suck in a person?
2004-09-29	Can you drink juice using a chikuwa, a recorder and a lotus root as a straw?
2004-09-29	How long does it take for electricity to travel?
2004-09-29	What is the taste of a heated banana, shortcake, hiyashi chūka, nattō, jelly and sushi?
2004-09-29	Can two people, who are not talking to each other directly over the phone, be able to talk to each other by fitting two telephone receivers together?
2004-09-29	What is the taste of peanuts, fava beans, almonds and soybeans after you run them through a coffeemaker?
2005-03-16	Do things spin in the opposite direction in the Southern hemisphere?
2005-03-16	How do Australians draw feces?
2005-03-16	Can a radio from Japan receive Japanese radio stations in Australia?
2005-03-16	What is the direction of the magnetic needle of a compass in Australia?

=== Ni no Arashi! ===
Kazunari Ninomiya's corner. Ninomiya would pull pranks on the other members.

Corner guide
Air date	Prank
2004-02-11	Arrest of a staff member in the middle of filming
2004-02-18	Fake tempura in a bento
2004-03-31	Fake bear in the van
2004-07-21	Vomiting fake blood
2004-09-08	After a multitude of encores, the members return to find elderly women demanding for another encore in their dressing room
2004-09-08	Having the concert audience call out for "Ninomiya" instead of "Arashi" for an encore
2004-09-22	Sudden spray of carbon dioxide from the ceiling
2005-02-09	Tricking Tetsurō Degawa into thinking he is pranking the other Arashi members while he is actually the one getting pranked
2005-07-27	Isolating Ohno in a room where a fake suicide occurred

=== M no Arashi! ===
Jun Matsumoto's corner. With the "M" standing for Mendokusai (めんどくさい, troublesome), Matsumoto would go out and do troublesome jobs.

Corner guide
Air date	Requester	Job
2004-07-14	Aiba	Picking up trash off Route 357
2004-08-18	Ohno	Cleaning up a river
2004-09-01	Sakurai	Taking pictures of Sakurai during the concert
2004-09-01	Ninomiya	Becoming Ninomiya's private backup dancer
2004-09-01	Aiba	Piggybacking Aiba during the concert
2004-09-01	Ohno	Throwing confetti over Ohno
2004-12-08	Staff of D no Arashi	Cleaning the staff room

=== O no Arashi! ===
Satoshi Ohno's corner. Ohno would randomly select two out of 100 photos and draw the two subjects together in one drawing using his own imagination.

Corner guide
Air date	Combinations
2004-08-18	Washroom sign and Saigō Takamori
2004-09-08	Baseball and a flamingo
2004-09-29	A statue of Hachikō and Ninomiya
2004-12-01	Moyai statue and kettle
2005-02-02	An injection and a blue ogre
2005-04-13	Ferris wheel, Rubik's Cube and a lion

== Distribution ==
=== Home media ===
VAP released all three series in a collection of two DVDs titled C×D×G no Arashi! Vol.1 and Vol.2. The DVDs peaked at number 3 and number 4 on the Oricon DVD chart.
