= Arashic =

Studio album by Arashi
- Released: July 5, 2006
- Recorded: 2006
- Genres: Pop, R&B, rock
- Length: 62:59 (Regular edition); 58:18 (Limited edition)
- Label: J Storm

Arashi chronology
One (2005)	Arashic (2006)	Time (2007)

Singles from Arashic
- 1. "Wish" Released: November 16, 2005; 2. "Kitto Daijōbu" Released: May 17, 2006

Arashic is the sixth studio album of the Japanese boy band Arashi. The album was released on July 5, 2006 in Japan under their record label J Storm in two editions: a limited CD+DVD version and a regular CD version. The album was the first album of the group to be released not only in Japan, but in Hong Kong, South Korea, Taiwan and Thailand as well. In Korea, the first 10,000 copies of the album were sold out on the first day and topped the non-Korean sales charts in the third week of July. The album was released digitally on February 7, 2020.

== Album information ==
The regular edition contains a bonus track and a 32-page booklet, while the limited edition contains a DVD with a digest of the group's live concert, One Summer Concert Tour. The album also contains the singles "Kitto Daijōbu" and "Wish," the theme song for the Japanese television drama Hana Yori Dango. For this album, instead of solo songs, the group did "pick-up" songs with one member singing as lead vocalist and the rest backing as support.

== Track listing ==
No.	Title	Lyrics	Music	Arrangement	Length
1.	"Wish"	Yōji Kubota	Hirō Ooyagi	Chokkaku	4:26
2.	"Runaway Train"	Spin; Sho Sakurai	Anthony Little; Rick Kelly	Masaya Suzuki	3:37
3.	"Raise Your Hands"	Spin; Sakurai	Shinnosuke	Shinnosuke	3:46
4.	"Kitto Daijōbu"	Spin; Sakurai	Stefan Olsson; Tim Norell	Jun Abe	4:50
5.	"Ready to Fly" (Main vocalist: Satoshi Ohno)	Masa-ya	Masaki Iehara	Tomoki Ishizuka	4:23
6.	"Caramel Song" (Main vocalist: Kazunari Ninomiya)	Takashi Ogawa	Noriyoshi Matsushita	Tetsuya Takahashi	4:59
7.	"Cool & Soul"	Spin; Sakurai	Taku Yoshioka	Yoshioka	3:53
8.	"Tabidachi no Asa"	Spin	Shusui; Fredrik Hult; Jonas Engstrand	Ha-j	5:31
9.	"I Want Somebody" (Main vocalist: Jun Matsumoto)	Axel G	Shusui; Stefan Åberg; Hult; Ola Larsson	Shusui; Åberg; Hult; Larsson	4:31
10.	"Secret Eyes" (Main vocalist: Masaki Aiba)	Erykah; Sakurai	Gajin	Masayuki Iwata	4:52
11.	"Chō² Arigatō" (Main vocalist: Sho Sakurai)	Erykah	Henrik Rongedal; Magnus Rongedal	Iwata	4:07
12.	"Carnival Night Part 2"	Kubota	Kōji Ueno	Seikō Nagaoka	4:58
13.	"Silver Ring"	Narumi Yamamoto	Gin Kitagawa	Kei Wakakusa	4:45
14.	"Love Parade" (Regular edition only)	Uzuki Nakayama	Madoka Doi; Kenichi Doki	Motoki Funayama	4:21
Total length:					62:59

DVD
No.	Title	Length
1.	"Arashi Live 2005 "One Summer Tour"" (Live footage of "Yes? No?", "Sakura Sake", "La Tormenta 2004", "Arashi", and "Subarashiki Sekai")

== Charts and certifications ==
=== Weekly charts ===
Chart (2006)	Peak position
Japan (Oricon Albums Chart)	1
South Korea (Gaon International Album Chart)	1
Taiwan (G-Music East Asian Chart)	2

=== Year-end charts ===
Chart (2006)	Peak position
Japan (Oricon Albums Chart)	80

=== Sales and certifications ===
Region	Certification	Certified units/sales
Japan (RIAJ)	Gold	165,795

== Release history ==
Region	Release date	Format	Label	Catalog
Japan	July 5, 2006	CD; CD+DVD	J Storm	JACA-5042, JACA-5041
South Korea	July 20, 2006	CD; CD+DVD	SM Entertainment	SMJTCD142
Taiwan	July 21, 2006	CD; CD+DVD	Avex Taiwan	JAJCD26001, JAJCD26001/A
Hong Kong	July 26, 2006	CD; CD+DVD	Avex Asia	
