= Step and Go =

Single by Arashi

from the album Dream "A" Live
- B-side: "Fuyu o Dakishimete"
- Released: February 20, 2008
- Genre: Dance-pop
- Label: J Storm
- Songwriter(s): Wonderland; Sho Sakurai; Youth Case

Arashi singles chronology
"Happiness" (2007)	"Step and Go" (2008)	"One Love" (2008)

"Step and Go" is a song recorded by Japanese boy band Arashi. It was released as a CD single in three editions: a regular edition containing instrumental versions of all the songs, a limited edition containing a DVD, and a special "Cubic Box" edition, which was only available to members of the group's official fan club in Japan. The latter edition contains an organizer set and a special edition CD. Unlike the group's previous release "Secret Talk", which contained only audio tracks, the limited edition of the single contains a filmed version of the talk.

== Chart performance ==
The single debuted at number one on the Oricon and Billboard Japan charts and sold over 300,000 copies in its first week. When the Billboard Japan charts debuted on February 29, 2008, "Step and Go" was its first Hot 100 and Hot Singles Sales number one song.

Despite the single's lack of direct tie-ins, the Oricon charts named "Step and Go" the twelfth best-selling single of 2008 in Japan.

== Track listing ==
Regular edition
No.	Title	Lyrics	Music	Arrangement	Length
1.	"Step and Go"	Wonderland; Sho Sakurai	Youth Case	Taku Yoshioka	4:48
2.	"Fuyu o Dakishimete" (冬を抱きしめて "Embrace the Winter")	Sei Fujise; Katsuhiko Fujiyama	Fujiyama	Tomoki Ishizuka	4:35
3.	"Step and Go" (instrumental)	Wonderland; Sakurai	Youth Case	Yoshioka	4:48
4.	"Fuyu o Dakishimete" (instrumental)	Fujise; Fujiyama	Fujiyama	Ishizuka	4:31
Total length:					18:42

Limited edition
No.	Title	Lyrics	Music	Arrangement	Length
1.	"Step and Go"	Wonderland; Sakurai	Youth Case	Yoshioka	4:48
Total length:					4:48

Limited edition – DVD
No.	Title	Length
1.	"Step and Go" (Music video and making-of)

Special Cu[9]bic Box edition
No.	Title	Lyrics	Music	Arrangement	Length
1.	"Step and Go"	Wonderland; Sakurai	Youth Case	Yoshioka	4:48
2.	"Cool & Soul for Dome07" (Live version from the Arashi Around Asia Tour)	Spin; Sakurai	Yoshioka	Yoshioka	4:42
Total length:					9:30

== Charts and certifications ==
=== Weekly charts ===
Chart (2008)	Peak position
Japan (Oricon Singles Chart)	1
Japan (Billboard Japan Hot 100)	1

=== Year-end charts ===
Chart (2008)	Peak position
Japan (Oricon Singles Chart)	12

=== Certifications ===
Region	Certification	Certified units/sales
Japan (RIAJ)	Platinum	374,449

== Release history ==
Region	Date
Japan	February 20, 2008
Taiwan	March 5, 2008
Hong Kong	March 17, 2008
