= Bambino! =

Japanese manga series

- First tankōbon volume cover

バンビ～ノ! (Banbiino!)
- Genre: Cooking
- Manga
- Written by: Tetsuji Sekiya
- Published by: Shogakukan
- Magazine: Big Comic Spirits
- Original run: December 6, 2004 – December 17, 2012
- Volumes: 28
- Series titles
- 1. Bambino! (2004–2009, 15 volumes); 2. Bambino! Secondo (2009–2012, 13 volumes)
- Television drama
- Directed by: Masatoshi Kato; Ken Murase; Chizu Asai
- Written by: Yoshikazu Okada
- Music by: Yugo Kanno
- Original network: Nippon TV
- Original run: April 18, 2007 – June 27, 2007
- Episodes: 11
- icon

Bambino! (Japanese: バンビ～ノ!, Hepburn: Banbīno!; lit. 'Baby') is a Japanese manga series written and illustrated by Tetsuji Sekiya. It was serialized in Shogakukan's seinen manga magazine Big Comic Spirits from December 2004 to February 2009, with its chapters collected in 15 tankōbon volumes. A second manga series, titled Bambino! Secondo, was serialized in the same magazine from April 2009 to December 2012, with its chapters collected in 13 volumes. An 11-episode television drama adaptation was broadcast on Nippon TV from April to June 2007.

In 2008, Bambino! received the 53rd Shogakukan Manga Award for the general category.

== Plot ==
Shogo Ban is a university student from Fukuoka Prefecture with a passion for Italian cuisine. While working part-time at Trattoria San Marzano, a local Italian restaurant, he earns his chef's license. During a university break, the restaurant's owner, Susumu Endo, arranges for Ban to work temporarily at Trattoria Bacchanale, a renowned Italian establishment in Tokyo's Roppongi district.

Inspired by the fast-paced environment of Bacchanale, Ban decides to pursue a culinary career in Tokyo and takes a leave of absence from university. This decision strains his relationship with his longtime girlfriend, Eri Takahashi, who remains in Fukuoka, leading to their separation. Initially hired at Bacchanale, Ban is assigned to front-of-house service rather than kitchen work, despite his objections. Over time, he recognizes the value of customer service experience, evolving from frequent conflicts with patrons to becoming a requested waiter.

After excelling in an autumn menu competition, Ban finally transitions to the kitchen but is placed under Toshio Oda, the temperamental pastry chef. Despite clashes with Oda, Ban hones his skills, eventually winning a dessert contest. Following further mentorship—and rivalry—with senior chef Nozomi Katori, he is appointed pasta chief at Trattoria Regale, Bacchanale's upcoming second location.

Before his transfer, Ban completes a two-month training stint in New York, including an unconventional cooking competition against the mafia. Returning with newfound confidence, he prepares for the grand opening of Trattoria Regale.

== Media ==
=== Manga ===
Written and illustrated by Tetsuji Sekiya, Bambino! was serialized in Shogakukan's seinen manga magazine Weekly Big Comic Spirits from December 13, 2004, to February 23, 2009. (Note: Finished in the magazine's 13th issue of 2009, released on February 23 of that same year.) Shogakukan collected its chapters in 15 tankōbon volumes, released from March 30, 2005, to April 30, 2009.

A direct sequel, Bambino! Secondo (バンビ〜ノ!SECONDO), was serialized in the same magazine from April 6, 2009, (Note: It started in the magazine's 19th issue of 2009, released of April 6 of that same year.) to December 17, 2012. Shogakukan collected its chapters in 13 tankōbon volumes, released from August 28, 2009, to January 30, 2013.

==== Volumes ====
===== Bambino! =====
No.	Release date	ISBN
1	March 30, 2005	978-4-09-187551-8
2	July 29, 2005	978-4-09-187552-5
3	January 30, 2006	978-4-09-187553-2
4	April 27, 2006	978-4-09-180317-7
5	July 28, 2006	978-4-09-180567-6
6	October 30, 2006	978-4-09-180779-3
7	February 28, 2007	978-4-09-181070-0
8	April 6, 2007	978-4-09-181165-3
9	July 30, 2007	978-4-09-181340-4
10	October 30, 2007	978-4-09-181509-5
11	February 29, 2008	978-4-09-181743-3
12	May 30, 2008	978-4-09-181892-8
13	August 29, 2008	978-4-09-182130-0
14	December 26, 2008	978-4-09-182249-9
15	April 30, 2009	978-4-09-182478-3

===== Bambino! Secondo =====
No.	Release date	ISBN
1	August 28, 2009	978-4-09-182578-0
2	November 30, 2009	978-4-09-182764-7
3	February 27, 2010	978-4-09-183017-3
4	June 30, 2010	978-4-09-183205-4
5	October 29, 2010	978-4-09-183488-1
6	February 26, 2011	978-4-09-183646-5
7	June 30, 2011	978-4-09-183840-7
8	August 30, 2011	978-4-09-184034-9
9	November 30, 2011	978-4-09-184174-2
10	March 30, 2012	978-4-09-184315-9
11	June 29, 2012	978-4-09-184520-7
12	September 28, 2012	978-4-09-184666-2
13	January 30, 2013	978-4-09-184854-3

=== Drama ===
An eleven-episode television drama adaptation, starring Jun Matsumoto as Shogo Ban, was broadcast on Nippon TV from April 18 to June 27, 2007. The opening song is "We Can Make It!" by Arashi.

==== Episodes ====
No.	Title	Original release date
1	"To work is not easy" "Shigototte amakunai" (Japanese: 仕事って甘くない)	April 18, 2007
2	"I won't lose" "Makete tamaruka" (Japanese: 負けてたまるか)	April 25, 2007
3	"Tears... the last day" "Namida... saigo no ichinichi" (Japanese: 涙…最後の一日)	May 2, 2007
4	"In Hakata... to the future" "Hakata hen... mirai e" (Japanese: 博多編…未来へ)	May 9, 2007
5	"What "work" means" "Hataraku to iukoto" (Japanese: 働くということ)	May 16, 2007
6	"What is love?" "Ai tte nandarou" (Japanese: 愛って何だろう)	May 23, 2007
7	"Pasta showdown for love" "Koi no pasuta taiketsu" (Japanese: 恋のパスタ対決)	May 30, 2007
8	"Magic of desserts" "Dezāto no mahou" (Japanese: デザートの魔法)	June 6, 2007
9	"Doors to the chef!!" "Ryōrinin e no tobira!!" (Japanese: 料理人への扉!!)	June 13, 2007
10	"I can cook!" "Ryōri ga tsukureru!" (Japanese: 料理が作れる!)	June 20, 2007
11	"Teary farewell... good bye Baccanale" "Namida no wakare... sayonara Bakkanāre" (Japanese: 涙の別れ…さよならバッカナーレ)	June 27, 2007

==== Soundtrack CD ====
The music of the drama series was composed by Yugo Kanno. A soundtrack CD was released by VAP on May 20, 2007.

== Reception ==
The Bambino! manga received the 53rd Shogakukan Manga Award for the general category in 2008, along with Takeshi Natsuhara's and Kuromaru's Kurosagi.

At the 53rd Television Drama Academy Awards in 2007, the Bambino! television drama series was awarded four prizes. They were: Best Actor (Jun Matsumoto), Supporting Actor (Kitamura Kazuki), Best Director and Special Award.
