= Arashi =

Japanese idol group

Arashi 嵐
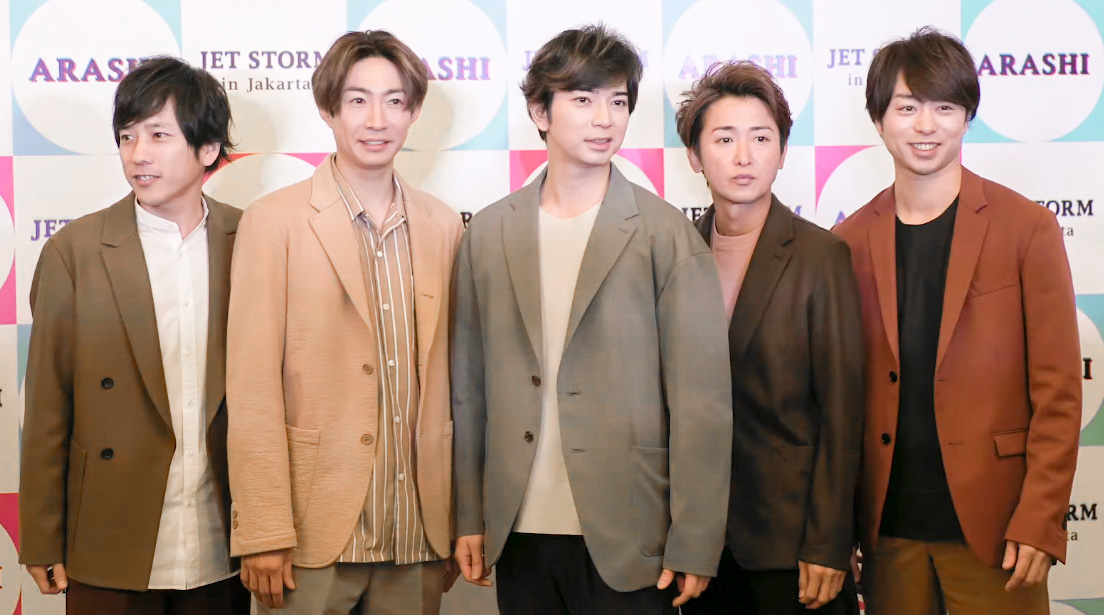
- Arashi in November 2019; L–R: Ninomiya, Aiba, Matsumoto, Ohno, and Sakurai

Background information
- Origin: Tokyo, Japan
- Genres: J-pop; rock; R&B; hip hop
- Years active: 1999–2026
- Labels: Pony Canyon (1999–2001); J Storm (2002–2020)
- Past members: Satoshi Ohno; Sho Sakurai; Masaki Aiba; Kazunari Ninomiya; Jun Matsumoto
- Website: Storm Labels; Starto entertainment

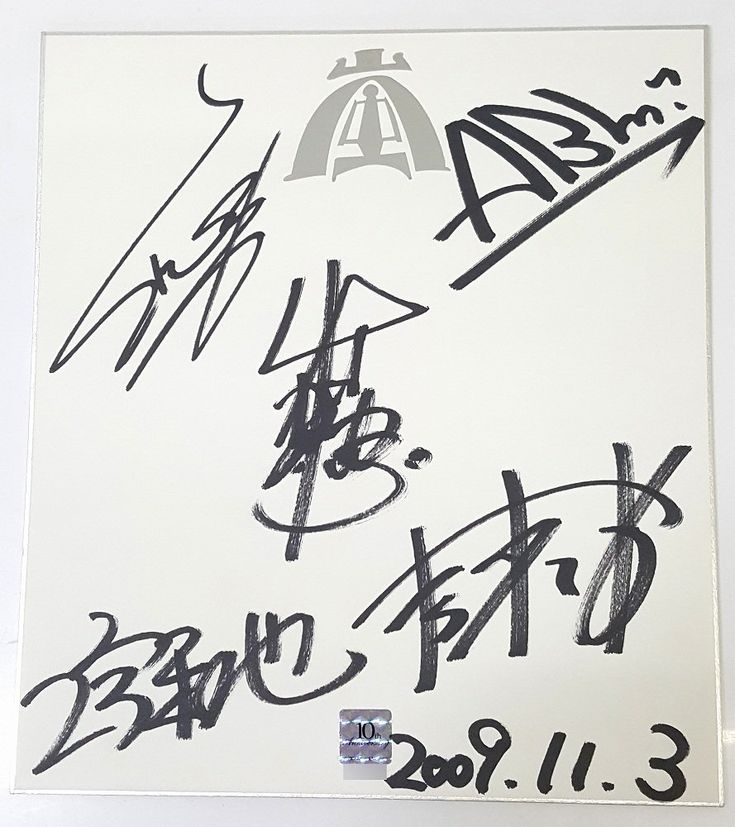
Autographs of Arashi members in 2009

Arashi (嵐; lit. "Storm") was a Japanese boy band formed by Johnny & Associates in 1999, consisting of five members: Satoshi Ohno, Sho Sakurai, Masaki Aiba, Kazunari Ninomiya, and Jun Matsumoto. The group was announced on September 15, 1999, aboard a cruise ship off the coast of Honolulu, Hawaii, and officially debuted on November 3, 1999. It remained with Johnny & Associates until 2023, when they became part of Starto Entertainment under an agent contract. They were initially signed to Pony Canyon, where they released one studio album and six singles, beginning with their 1999 eponymous debut single. In 2001 they were moved to the Johnny's subsidiary label J Storm, which was set up for their succeeding releases.

Their eighteenth single "Love So Sweet", theme song for Matsumoto's drama Hana Yori Dango 2, was one of the top five best-selling singles of 2007 in Japan, and their first single to exceed 400,000 copies sold overall in nearly seven years. In the following two years, Arashi became the first artist to place the top two rankings on the Oricon singles yearly chart with their singles "Truth / Kaze no Mukō e" and "One Love" in 2008, and "Believe / Kumorinochi, Kaisei" and "Ashita no Kioku / Crazy Moon (Kimi wa Muteki)" in 2009. They simultaneously topped the 2009 Oricon singles, album and music DVD yearly charts, becoming the third artist in Oricon history to monopolize the top three best-selling singles of the year. In 2010, all six of Arashi's singles ranked within the top ten of the Oricon singles yearly chart, and their million-selling studio album Boku no Miteiru Fūkei was named the best-selling album of the year in Japan. As of October 2020, the group had sold over 58.8 million copies of albums, singles and videos, becoming the best selling boy band in Asia. Since then, Arashi continued to release chart-topping singles and albums, performed in sold-out concert tours, host a number of variety shows, and remained an influential figure in Japanese media.

On January 27, 2019, Arashi announced that group activities would be suspended as of December 31, 2020. On May 6, 2025 the group announced their end of activities following a final tour in the spring of 2026, which came to a close on May 31 at Tokyo Dome.

== History ==
=== 1999–2001: Debut and departure from Pony Canyon ===
Johnny & Associates announced the group's debut on September 15, 1999, through a press conference aboard a cruise ship off the coast of Honolulu, Hawaii. Then-president Johnny Kitagawa chose five trainees from the Johnny's Jr. division of the agency to become the members of Arashi, the Japanese word for Storm, and to represent the agency's thrust of "creating a storm throughout the world". On November 3, 1999, they made their CD debut by releasing the single "Arashi", which became the theme song for the FIVB Volleyball Men's World Cup hosted by Japan in 1999. It went on to become a major hit, selling 557,430 copies in its first week and almost a million copies by the end of its chart run.

On April 5, 2000, Arashi released their second single, "Sunrise Nippon/Horizon", which debuted at number-one on the Oricon weekly singles chart selling 304,340 copies. The next day, the group began their first concert tour at Osaka Hall. In July, the group released their next single "Typhoon Generation", which debuted at number three on the weekly singles chart with 256,510 copies sold, and continued to chart for nine weeks before leaving the charts. After holding more concerts in August, the group released their last single of 2000, "Kansha Kangeki Ame Arashi". The single debuted at number two on the Oricon weekly singles chart and had first-week sales of 258,720.

In January 2001, Arashi released their first studio album, Arashi No.1 Ichigou: Arashi wa Arashi o Yobu!. The album debuted at number-one on the Oricon weekly album chart with initial sales of 267,220 copies. Until the release of their tenth anniversary compilation album All the Best! 1999–2009, the album remained the group's best-selling album with overall sales of about 323,030 for nearly ten years. From March 25 to April 30, 2001, the group embarked on their first nationwide concert tour Arashi Spring Concert 2001. The tour took place in Sendai, Osaka, Nagoya, Hokkaidō, Fukuoka, Hiroshima, Kanazawa, Toyama, and Tokyo with an unprecedented twenty-six performances. Before moving to a private record label by the end of 2001, Arashi released "Jidai" as their final single under Pony Canyon. Used as the theme song for Matsumoto's drama Kindaichi Shōnen no Jikenbo 3, it was named Best Theme Song in the 30th Television Drama Academy Awards.

=== 2002–2005: J Storm and decline in sales ===
Arashi began 2002 by releasing their first single under J Storm. "A Day in Our Life" was used as the theme song for Sakurai's comedy drama Kisarazu Cat's Eye and debuted atop of the Oricon weekly singles chart selling 226,480 copies. Their subsequent releases of the year, "Nice na Kokoroiki" and "Pikanchi", were used as the theme songs for the anime Kochira Katsushika-ku Kameari Kōen-mae Hashutsujo and Arashi's movie Pikanchi Life is Hard Dakedo Happy (ピカ☆ンチ Life is HardだけどHappy, Pikanchi Life is Hard But Happy) respectively.

Starting in 2003, the group would only release two singles every year until 2007. Both singles released in 2003, "Tomadoi Nagara" and "Hadashi no Mirai/Kotoba Yori Taisetsu na Mono", debuted at number two on the charts. The song "Kotoba Yori Taisetsu na Mono" marked the first time a member contributed to the penning of a single, as many of the group's songs are produced by other lyricists, composers, or musicians. Sakurai, who is the designated rapper of Arashi, has since written all the incorporated rap lyrics of the group's releases. (Note: For a list of the contributions Sakurai has made to Arashi's songs, please see his page.)

The year 2004 was Arashi's fifth anniversary since debut. They began the year by releasing their twelfth single, "Pikanchi Double", in February as the theme song for their second movie Pikanchi Life is Hard Dakara Happy (ピカ☆ンチ Life is HardだからHappy, Pikanchi Life is Hard Thus Happy). Selling 89,106 copies in the first week, it is Arashi's lowest-selling single to date. In celebration of their anniversary, the group released a greatest hits album 5x5 The Best Selection of 2002–2004, which included their second 2004 single "Hitomi no Naka no Galaxy/Hero".

In 2005, on New Year's Day, Arashi released their first concert DVD since How's It Going? in 2003 titled 2004 Arashi! Iza, Now Tour!!. From July 26 to August 24, they embarked on a summer tour titled One to support their album of the same name. One of the highlights of the tour included the live performance their first single of the year, "Sakura Sake", on top of "Johnny's Moving Stage" (ジャニーズムービングステージ, Janizu Mubingu Suteji), a transparent stage that travels over the top of the audience. Invented by Matsumoto, "Johnny's Moving Stage" has since been used in a majority of Arashi's concerts to allow them to move closer to the audience seated at a distance from the main stage. In November, Arashi released a theme song for the manga-based drama Hana Yori Dango, which starred Matsumoto as one of the lead actors. "Wish" went on to sell an estimated 178,000 copies in its first week and over 300,000 copies by the end of its chart run, making it their first single to sell over 300,000 copies in total in nearly three years since "A Day in Our Life" in 2002.

=== 2006: International activities in Asia ===
By 2006, the group's singles and albums were being released outside Japan. Their studio album, Arashic, was released not only in Japan, but also in Hong Kong, South Korea, Taiwan, and Thailand. The album was successful in Korea as the first 10,000 copies of the album were sold out on the first day, and it even topped the non-Korean sales charts on the third week of July.

In the midst of Arashi's summer concert tour Arachic Arashic Arasick Cool and Soul, the group embarked on a publicity tour around Asia called Jet Storm Tour on July 31. The group visited Taiwan, Thailand and South Korea, countries which later became part of their 2006 Asia tour, all in one day to hold press conferences and promote their Arashic album. For two days, September 16 and 17, Arashi held their first concerts in Taipei at the Taipei Arena.

Performing "Arashi", "Wish" and "Kitto Daijōbu", which was their first single release of the year, the group represented Japan in the 3rd annual Asia Song Festival in South Korea on September 22. Almost two months later, they became the first group from Johnny's to perform individual concerts in South Korea. According to The Korea Times, the concerts in Korea were decided because about 1,500 Korean fans gathered at the Incheon International Airport during the group's Jet Storm Tour. Arashi proved popular to Korean fans when their concert tickets were sold out in an hour, as some 150,000 people rushed to book tickets online.

The group traveled back to Japan and then released their second and final the single of the year "Aozora Pedal", which was written and composed by Japanese musician Shikao Suga and used for Sakurai's movie Honey and Clover. Although Arashi had planned to return to Thailand to hold a concert on October 7, it was canceled due to a military coup d'état.

=== 2007: Returning to the Japanese market ===
On February 21, the group released their first single of the year, "Love So Sweet", the theme song for the high-rating drama Hana Yori Dango 2, which peaked at the number-one spot on the Oricon daily and weekly charts. It is also Arashi's first single to sell more than 200,000 copies in a week in almost five years. Their nineteenth single "We Can Make It!", released on May 2, also charted number-one on the Oricon daily and weekly charts.

In April, the group performed in one of their largest concerts: Arashi Around Asia in Dome, a continuation of their Triumphant Homecoming concert held in January, which was aimed to celebrate the successful Asia tour. Arashi Around Asia in Dome was held at the Kyocera Dome in Osaka and at Tokyo Dome, making it Arashi's first time performing there. On July 14, Arashi launched their summer tour titled Time – Kotoba no Chikara to support their seventh studio album Time. The album sold over 190,000 copies in its first week, not only extending the group's string of number-one releases but also propelling the album to reach Platinum status by Recording Industry Association of Japan (RIAJ).

Also in July, the TBS drama production of the manga Yamada Tarō Monogatari, which starred Ninomiya and Sakurai, began. Arashi sang the theme song of the drama, titled "Happiness", and released it on September 5 as their third single of the year. The year proved successful for the group as all of their singles ranked within the Top 30 of the annual Oricon charts, with "Love So Sweet" ranking fourth in single sales overall, making it the group's first single to rank within the Top 10 on the annual charts. "Love So Sweet" was also named one of The Best 10 Singles in the 22nd Japan Gold Disc Awards in 2008.

=== 2008: Rising popularity in Japan ===
The group's success in 2007 sparked renewed public interest. In February, Arashi released their first single of the year, "Step and Go", which debuted at the top of the Oricon weekly chart for having sold 324,223 copies, making it as the group's first single to exceed 300,000 copies sold in the first week since "Sunrise Nippon/Horizon" in 2000. The same month, it was announced that the group would be doing a concert tour of the five major domes in Tokyo, Nagoya, Osaka, Fukuoka, and Sapporo. The tour, titled Arashi Marks 2008 Dream-A-Live, consisted of ten performances, from May 16 in Osaka to July 6 in Sapporo. The only other Johnny's artists who have done a five dome tour were SMAP and KinKi Kids. The tour also coincided with their eighth studio album, Dream "A" Live, which was reported to be a hit with male buyers by Oricon despite the fact that most releases by Johnny's artists are geared towards female teens and young adults. In the midst of the tour, Arashi released their twenty-second single "One Love", the theme song for the last production of the Hana Yori Dango trilogy. Like "Step and Go", the single sold over 300,000 copies in its first week and charted at number-one of the weekly singles chart.

As the start of the group's second Asia tour, Arashi became the third musical group—after SMAP and Dreams Come True—to perform at the National Olympic Stadium in Tokyo as their first major outdoor concert on September 5. The first two legs of the tour included a return to Taipei and Seoul while the third leg was a first time trip to Shanghai. The concert in Shanghai also marked Johnny & Associates' first concert in China. Almost a month after the release of "One Love", their twenty-third single, "Truth/Kaze no Mukō e", was released. Debuting atop of the Oricon weekly charts, the double A-side single sold 467,288 copies. Before the group's concert in Shanghai on November 15, they released their fourth single of the year, "Beautiful Days", which was used as the theme song for Ninomiya's drama Ryūsei no Kizuna. Although "Beautiful Days" only had a little over a month to chart before the Oricon charting period for 2008 ended on December 11, the single managed to climb up to be the tenth best-selling single of the year. Their concert DVD Summer Tour 2007 Final Time - Kotoba no Chikara, released on April 16, also ranked as the second best-selling music DVD of 2008 and ranked sixth place in the general DVD category.

=== 2009: 10th anniversary ===
The group released two double A-side singles, "Believe/Kumorinochi, Kaisei" and "Ashita no Kioku/Crazy Moon (Kimi wa Muteki)", on March 4 and May 27 respectively. Both singles sold over 500,000 copies in first week sales, making Arashi the first artist to have two consecutive singles exceed the 500,000 mark within a week in seven years seven months since Keisuke Kuwata.

At the end of June, Arashi announced their tenth anniversary tour Arashi Anniversary Tour 5x10, which included three consecutive shows at the National Olympic Stadium in Tokyo. They became the first artist to play at the stadium for three consecutive days. Their third single of the year, "Everything", was released on July 1 and sold nearly 342,000 copies in the first week. On August 19, Arashi released their greatest hits album All the Best! 1999–2009, which featured most of their singles since debut, a new song with lyrics written by the members themselves, and a limited edition third disc containing ten of the group's selections. The album sold over 753,000 copies in the first week. Thirteen days after the release, the album broke the one million mark, a first in Arashi's history. It became the first album of 2009 to break one million.

On November 11, Arashi released "My Girl" as their last single of the year. It debuted atop of the Oricon daily chart by selling about 178,000 copies on the first day and about 432,000 copies by the end of its first week. It was announced on November 17 that Arashi had thus monopolized the top four best first-week sales for singles of 2009.

On November 20, Arashi held an event organized by House Foods called Arashi in Tokyo DisneySea Premium Event. Reserving the entire theme park for one night, the group performed a special medley of Christmas songs and their own songs such as "Arashi" and "One Love", which made the Arashi the first celebrity to sing their own songs at Tokyo DisneySea.

Arashi attended the 60th NHK Kōhaku Uta Gassen on New Year's Eve, making it not only the group's first time performing on the show but also the first time in twenty-one years another group from Johnny's other than SMAP and Tokio, the two traditional participants, performed at Kōhaku.

=== 2010: Continued success ===
On January 5, it was announced that Arashi would provide the song "Yurase, Ima o" as the theme song for the 2010 Winter Olympics news coverage on NTV. On January 6, Sakurai announced that Arashi would provide the theme song "Troublemaker" for his then-upcoming comedy drama. The next day, Mezamashi TV aired the first preview of the theme song for the drama special Saigo no Yakusoku, the group's first drama together in nearly ten years. The theme song "Sora Takaku" was announced during the press conference for the drama special on December 15, 2009. Of the three newly recorded songs, only "Troublemaker" and "Yurase, Ima o" were included in the group's first single of the year released on March 3, with "Troublemaker" being the A-side song.

On February 24, the 24th Japan Gold Disc Awards awarded Arashi the "Artist of the Year" prize and nine other awards in various categories. As a result, they became the first artist to win ten awards at once.

It was announced on April 5 that Arashi would provide the theme song "Monster", which was released on May 19 as a single, for Ohno's fantasy comedy drama based on Fujiko Fujio's manga series Kaibutsu-kun. On May 24, "Monster" debuted at number-one on the Oricon weekly chart selling 543,000 copies in its first week, making Arashi the first act to have thirty consecutive singles rank in Oricon's weekly Top 3 since their debut.

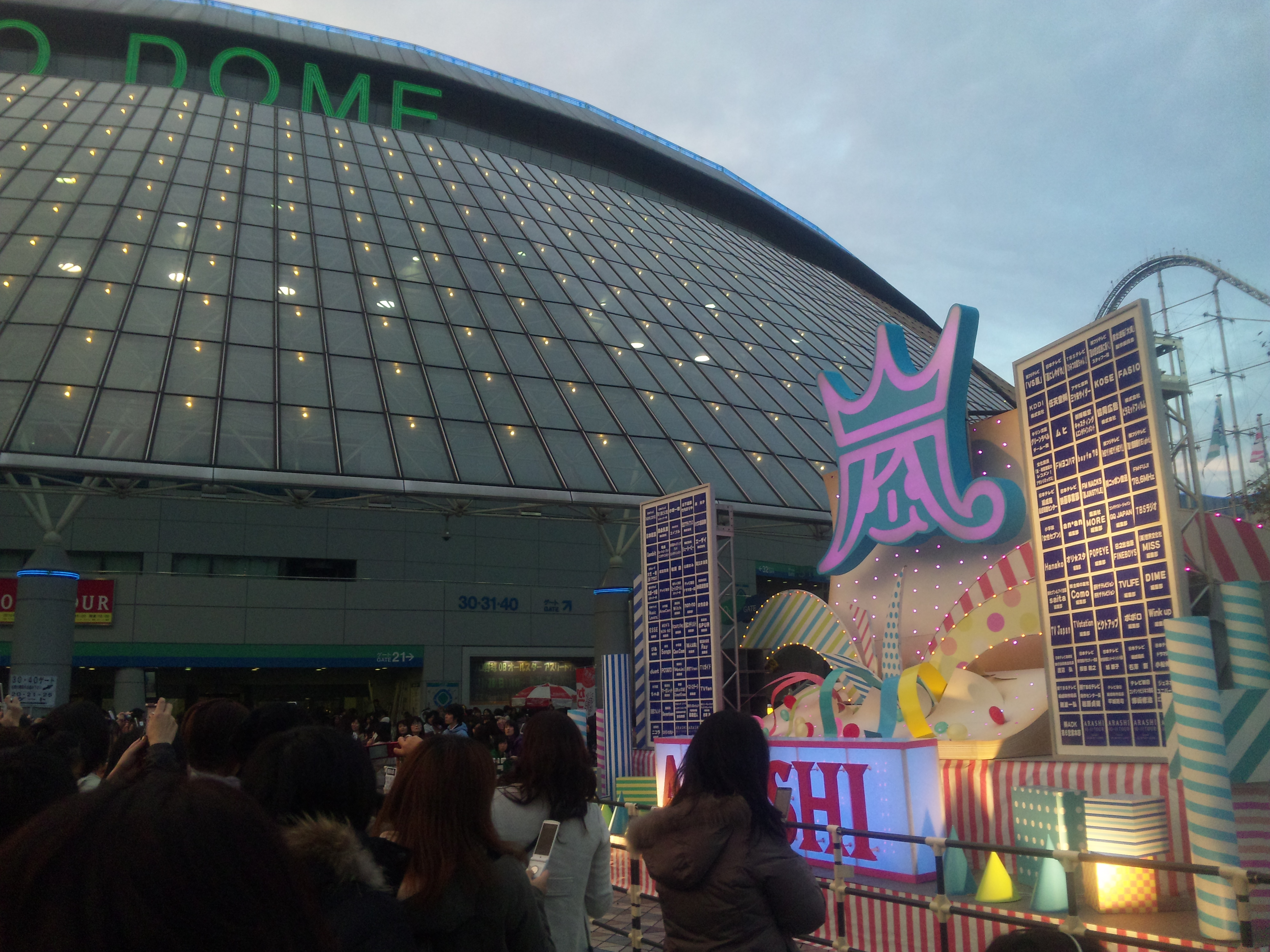
Arashi's concert at Tokyo Dome in November 2010

On June 5, it was announced that the group was to release their first studio album in two years and four months since Dream "A" Live (April 2008) and hold a nationwide concert tour at the National Olympic Stadium in Tokyo for four days and the five major domes in Osaka, Sapporo, Tokyo, Nagoya and Fukuoka. Although the four days are not consecutive, Arashi became the first to hold four concerts at the National Olympic Stadium in the same tour.

The group's song "Love Rainbow" was used as the theme song for the romance drama Natsu no Koi wa Nijiiro ni Kagayaku (夏の恋は虹色に輝く, Summer Love Shines in Rainbow Colors) starring Matsumoto and Yūko Takeuchi. "To Be Free", Arashi's third single of 2010, became the group's twentieth consecutive number-one single since "Pikanchi Double" (2004) on July 13. Together with Ohno's solo single "Yukai Tsukai Kaibutsu-kun" (ユカイツーカイ怪物くん), which was released on the same day as "To Be Free" and placed at number-two, Arashi and Ohno accomplished the rare feat of a group and a solo artist from the group simultaneously taking the top two spots for the first time in nearly ten years.

Arashi provided the theme song "Dear Snow" for the live-action movie adaptation of the award-winning Ōoku: The Inner Chambers manga starring Ninomiya and Kou Shibasaki. On August 10, Arashi's ninth studio album Boku no Miteiru Fūkei placed at number-one on the Oricon weekly album chart, selling around 731,000 copies. The album maintained its number-one spot in the second week, making it Arashi's first studio album to lead the Oricon weekly album chart for two consecutive weeks. By selling around another 125,000 copies, the album has sold a total of 856,000 copies. In September, Japan Airlines (JAL) launched a domestic Boeing 777-200 bearing both the images of the members of Arashi and the title of their Boku no Miteiru Fūkei album, which was sold with a specially designed cover in-flight. Japan Airlines will use the Arashi Jet until January 2011.

The song "Love Rainbow" was released as a single on September 8. It debuted at number-one on the Oricon weekly singles chart and sold around 529,000 copies, making "Love Rainbow" the group's third 2010 single to surpass 500,000 copies sold in the first week. On October 12, Boku no Miteiru Fūkei sold a total of a million copies, making it the group's first studio album to sell over a million copies and the first album in Japan to reach a million copies sold in 2010. Additionally, "Dear Snow" was released as a single on October 6 and became Arashi's fourth 2010 single to sell over 500,000 copies in the first week.

The group released their sixth single of 2010, "Hatenai Sora", on November 10. The single sold 572,000 copies in its first week, surpassing the group's old personal record of 557,000 copies sold in the first week set by their debut song "Arashi" in 1999. The group became the first male artist to achieve six number-one singles in a year. On December 31, 2010, Arashi co-hosted the 61st NHK Kōhaku Uta Gassen with Nao Matsushita, becoming the first group to host the show.

=== 2011: Beautiful World ===
On January 5, 2011, the 25th Japan Gold Disc Awards awarded Arashi the "Artist of the Year" prize for the second year in a row. It was announced on January 15, 2011, that Arashi would release the song "Lotus" as a single on February 23, 2011. "Lotus" was also adopted as the theme song for Aiba's drama Bartender.

Released on January 26, 2011, Arashi's music DVD Arashi 10–11 Tour "Scene": Kimi to Boku no Miteiru Fūkei – Stadium sold 618,000 copies in its first week, making it the first music DVD in Oricon history to sell over 600,000 copies in the first week. The DVD sold another 59,000 copies, bringing the total to an estimate of 677,000 copies sold and pushing the group's overall music DVD sales to 4,014,000 copies. As a result, Arashi became the first artist in Oricon history to sell over four million DVDs.

In early May 2011, the group announced their new tour with concerts in July, September, and January 2012 called the "Beautiful World Concert Tour". The group then announced on May 19, 2011, that they will hold charity events at Tokyo Dome for three days starting June 24, 2011, release their tenth studio album titled Beautiful World on July 6, 2011, and start their nationwide concert tour on July 24, 2011. According to Matsumoto, the title was chosen to reflect on Arashi's thoughts on the future of Japan after the 2011 Tohoku earthquake. Their nationwide tour was held at four of the five major domes and the National Olympic Stadium, making it the group's fourth consecutive year performing at the stadium.

On June 22, 2011, Oricon announced that the group's second music DVD Arashi 10–11 Tour "Scene": Kimi to Boku no Miteiru Fūkei – Dome+ sold 539,000 copies in its first week of sales, pushing their all-time DVD sales to 5.282 million, making them the first Japanese artist to sell over five million DVDs.

On October 19, 2011, NHK announced Arashi and actress Mao Inoue as the hosts for the 62nd NHK Kōhaku Uta Gassen. This was the second year in a row for Arashi to be in charge of the White Team.

On November 2, 2011, the group released their 36th single "Meikyū Love Song". "Meikyū Love Song" was adapted as the ending theme song for Sakurai's drama Nazotoki wa Dinner no Ato de. The single sold over 240,000 copies on the first day and over 530,000 copies in the first week.

In December 2011, it was announced that Arashi topped four categories in the 2011 Oricon yearly rankings. Beautiful World sold a total of 908,000 copies, making it the top-selling album of 2011 in Japan. This marks the third consecutive year that Arashi has topped the Oricon yearly album chart, being the first artist to do so in twenty years. This year's ranking also marks the third consecutive year that Arashi has topped the music DVD charts as Arashi 10–11 Tour "Scene": Kimi to Boku no Miteiru Fūkei – Stadium sold 793,000 copies, making it the best selling music DVD in Oricon DVD ranking history. The second best selling music DVD for 2011 was Arashi's Arashi 10–11 Tour "Scene": Kimi to Boku no Miteiru Fūkei – Dome+, which sold 673,000 copies. The group was the 2nd artist by total sales revenue in Japan in 2011, with ¥15.369 billion.

=== 2012: Popcorn ===
On March 7, 2012, Arashi released their 37th single, "Wild at Heart". "Wild at Heart" was the theme song for Matsumoto's drama Lucky Seven. The single sold 550,000 copies in the first week, making it the group's third highest first week sales after Hatenai Sora and Arashi (This position later became fourth highest after the 2013 release of Calling/Breathless"). Later in March, Arashi revealed their second single for 2012 and 38th in total, "Face Down". The single was released on May 9 and was the theme song for Ohno's drama Kagi no Kakatta Heya. In late April, the release date of June 6 was announced for their 39th single Your Eyes, which is the theme song for Aiba Masaki's NTV drama Mikeneko Holmes no Suiri (三毛猫ホームズの推理). Not since "Dear Snow" and "Hatenai Sora" (Beautiful World) in 2010 have two singles been released within a month of each other. "Face Down" and "Your Eyes" sold 526,000 and 478,000 copies in the first week respectively. In addition, Arashi released a music DVD titled Arashi Live Tour Beautiful World on May 23, which sold approximately 572,000 copies in the first week.

On July 20, 2012, Arashi announced a concert titled "Ara-fes" which was held at the National Olympic Stadium in Tokyo on September 20 and 21 of the same year. This marked the fifth consecutive year in which the group has performed at the National Olympic Stadium. It was announced that the group would also perform there in 2013. Proposed by the Arashi members themselves, the concept of "Arafes" is that the set list was determined by fan voting, from a total of 240 songs including singles, couplings, and album tracks. A total of 44 tracks were chosen to be performed.

On October 31, Arashi released their 11th studio album, Popcorn. The album sold over 750,000 copies and was certified for a Triple Platinum by the RIAJ. The Popcorn Live Tour ran through December into January and was reported as of December 15 to have attracted 730,000 people with 16 shows. Arashi hosted the 63rd NHK Kōhaku Uta Gassen on New Year's Eve for their third consecutive year with actress Maki Horikita. Ninomiya declared, "I want to win this year." Sakurai added, "We want to do something new as artists."

The group was the 3rd artist by total sales revenue in Japan in 2012, with ¥10.454 billion.

=== 2013: Love ===
On January 11, Arashi announced that their 40th single "Calling/Breathless" would be released on March 6. The double A-side single features the themes for Aiba Masaki's Fuji TV drama Last Hope and Ninomiya Kazunari's feature film Platina Data (プラチナデータ). The first video preview for "Calling" was unveiled on February 5 with an introduction by Aiba referring to his drama as "medical suspense entertainment".

Arashi's live DVD Arafes, released on December 26, 2012, reportedly sold over 624,000 copies and as of the end of January remains in the leading position of the Oricon charts, entering the fifth week in this position. The succeeding DVD concert was revealed on March 16, titled after the 2012 album of same name "Arashi Live Tour: Popcorn".

After the release of the double sided single "Calling/Breathless", it was soon announced by Oricon that the single had sold a record number of copies in its first week, at approximately 756,000. This sales record makes their 40th single the most successful in terms of first week sales. The single later went on to sell over 853,467 copies. Arashi announced their 41st single, "Endless Game" on April 9 during a press conference for drama "Kazoku Game" which was attended by star of the aforementioned, member Sakurai Sho. The single was announced for a May 29 release date.

On September 21 and 22 Arashi once again held Arafes concerts in the National Olympic Stadium. This marked their sixth consecutive year of performing in the stadium. They also embarked on a dome tour which lasted from November 8 until December 22.

On October 23, the group released their twelfth studio album, Love. The album sold over 670,000 copies in its first week. The Love Live Tour ran from November to December 2013. Oricon awarded Arashi with six awards this year, including the highest total sales award.

Arashi hosted the 64th NHK Kōhaku Uta Gassen on New Year's Eve for their 4th consecutive year with actress Haruka Ayase.

The group was the 1st artist by total sales revenue in Japan in 2013, with ¥14.192 billion.

=== 2014: 15th Anniversary ===
Arashi released their 42nd single, "Bittersweet", on February 12, 2014. "Bittersweet" is the theme song for Matsumoto's drama, Shitsuren Chocolatier. On April 30, 2014, Arashi released their new single, "Guts!", which was used as the theme song for Ninomiya's drama, Yowakutemo Katemasu. In addition, Arashi released a live DVD/Blu-ray titled Arashi Arafes '13 National Stadium 2013 on May 21, 2014. This featured the group's live performance from September 22 of the previous year at the National Olympic Stadium, and was the first time that their concert DVD was also released as a Blu-ray. Following that, Arashi released their 44th single, "Daremo Shiranai", on May 28, 2014. The song was used as the theme song for Ohno's drama Shinigami-kun. The group's live DVD titled Arashi Live Tour 2013 "Love" was released on July 30, 2014.

To celebrate their 15th anniversary, Arashi had concerts in Oahu, Hawaii, on September 19 and 20, 2014 titled "Arashi Blast in Hawaii". They also held the event "Arashi no Wakuwaku Gakkou 2014 Deepening the Bonds of Friendship" in June with live viewing in Shanghai and Singapore. During this event, the members of Arashi announced that they would be releasing a new album in the fall and holding a 5-dome tour. There were 18 performances altogether, and an accumulated total of over 840,000 fans attending, making it their largest dome tour to date. All five members of Arashi starred in a spin-off movie of the Pikanchi series, 10 years after the previous release. The spin-off, titled Pikanchi Life is Hard Tabun Happy (read as "Pikanchi Half"), marked the first time in seven years that the members starred in the same movie together, since Kiiroi Namida, released in 2007.

Arashi released their thirteenth studio album, The Digitalian, in October 2014. It contained 16 tracks, including "Bittersweet" from Matsumoto's drama Shitsuren Chocolatier, "Guts!" from Ninomiya's drama Yowakutemo Katemasu, and "Daremo Shiranai" from Ohno's drama Shinigami-kun. Arashi co-hosted the 65th NHK Kōhaku Uta Gassen on New Year's Eve (their fifth consecutive year) with actress Yuriko Yoshitaka and announcer Yumiko Udo as general moderator.

It was announced by Oricon that the group is the artist with the highest total sales revenue in Japan for 2014, with ¥13.823 billion.

=== 2015: Japonism ===
Arashi's first single of 2015, titled "Sakura", was released on February 25. "Sakura" was the theme song for the drama Ouroboros, starring actors Toma Ikuta and Shun Oguri. This marked the first time that Arashi provided a theme song for a drama that did not star one of its members. The single sold 465,000 copies in its first week and topped the Oricon weekly ranking. In addition, the DVD/Blu-ray of Arashi starring movie Pikanchi Life is Hard Tabun Happy was released on the same day. The DVD and Blu-ray sold 72,000 copies and 88,000 copies in its first week respectively and topped both the Oricon DVD and Blu-ray Disk weekly rankings. The first week sales of 88,000 copies is the highest record for any Japanese movie on Blu-ray.

Arashi released a live DVD, Arashi Blast in Hawaii on April 15, 2015. On May 13, 2015, they released their 46th single titled "Aozora no Shita, Kimi no Tonari" which is the theme song for member Aiba Masaki's drama, Yōkoso, Wagaya e. The single sold 501,010 copies in its first week and became Arashi's second chart-topping single of the year. Arashi released their 47th single on September 2, 2015, titled "Ai o Sakebe" which was used as the background song for the Recruit Zexy commercial. The single sold 463,000 copies in its first week and topped Oricon's weekly single ranking. This became their 36th consecutive single to top Oricon's weekly single ranking.

On September 19, 20, 22 and 23, Arashi held a series of concerts titled "Arashi Blast in Miyagi" in Miyagi Stadium. The concerts were part of the second installment of "Arashi BLAST" which started in Hawaii the previous year. These concerts were meant to aid the reconstruction of the disaster area which was affected during the 2011 Tōhoku Earthquake. The concerts brought together an accumulated total of 208,000 fans, and marked the first time in eight years that the group performed in the Tōhoku region.

On October 21, the group released their fourteenth studio album, Japonism. It contained 20 tracks, including "Sakura" from the drama Ouroboros, and "Aozora no Shita, Kimi no Tonari" from Aiba's drama Yokoso, Wagaya E. The album sold over 950,000 copies and was certified for Million by the Recording Industry Association of Japan. To support the album, Arashi embarked on a dome tour hitting the 5 major domes, from November 6 until December 23. With the wrap up of the tour, Arashi had mobilized 10,163,000 of concerts attendees in their last 17 years, setting a record number of attendees in the shortest number of years. To celebrate their 17th anniversary, Arashi announced that they would continue the Japonism tour in 2016 with "Arashi 'Japonism Show' in Arena". This would be their first Arena concert tour for 9 years (their last being the 'Arashi Summer Tour 2007 Time -コトバノチカラ-').

Arashi's album Japonism was the highest selling album of the year in Japan. They also topped the music DVD charts with their Arashi Blast in Hawaii concert film as well as the music Blu-ray charts with Arashi Live Tour 2014 The Digitalian. "Aozora no Shita, Kimi no Tonari", "Sakura" and "Ai o Sakebe" ranked 9th, 11th and 12th respectively on the end of year singles ranking. Arashi attended the 66th NHK Kōhaku Uta Gassen as part of the white team, and hosted the Johnny's Countdown 2015–2016 concert.

It was announced by Oricon that the group is the artist with the highest total sales revenue in Japan for 2015, with ¥14,328 billion.

=== 2016: Are You Happy? ===
Arashi's first single of 2016, "Fukkatsu Love" was released on February 24. The single was composed by Tatsuro Yamashita and the lyrics were written by Mariya Takeuchi. The single was used as the background song for NTT Docomo d hits. The single sold 485,006 copies in its first week and topped the Oricon weekly ranking.

On May 18, the group released their first double A-side single titled "I Seek/Daylight" since 2013's "Calling/Breathless". The single was used as the theme songs for Sekai Ichi Muzukashii Koi starring Ohno, and 99.9 Keiji Senmon Bengoshi starring Matsumoto. The single sold 737,951 in its first week and topped the Oricon single chart. It retained the number one position for the following week by selling an additional 48,420 copies. On September 14, Arashi released the single "Power of the Paradise". The title track was used as the theme song to NTV's coverage of the 2016 Olympics in Rio.

On October 26, Arashi released their fifteenth studio album, Are You Happy? The album sold over 636,000 copies in its first week and topped the Oricon charts. To support the album, Arashi held a live tour from November 2016 to January 2017, performing at all the major dome stadiums in Japan. Are You Happy? went on to become the highest selling album of 2016 in Japan. It was also announced that Arashi had the highest total sales revenue in Japan for 2016, with ¥12.183 billion and topped the music Blu-Ray charts with "Arashi Live Tour 2015 Japonism" and "Arashi Blast in Miyagi". On December 31, Arashi attended the 67th NHK Kōhaku Uta Gassen as part of the white team, with group member Aiba hosting alongside Kasumi Arimura. For the first time, Arashi were chosen to be this year's "ootori", the act chosen to perform last and close the show.

The group was awarded the 2016 Artist of the Year award by the RIAJ. They became the first artist to receive this award five times during their career.

=== 2017: Untitled ===
Arashi released their first single of 2017, "I'll Be There", on April 19, which served as the theme song for the drama Kizoku Tantei starring Masaki Aiba. In addition, the group released a live DVD, ARASHI Live Tour 2016–2017 Are You Happy? on May 31. The limited edition of this DVD also features their concert in Yokohama Arena in August 2016 from their "Arashi 'Japonism Show' in Arena" tour. It topped the Oricon charts, selling approximately 650,000 copies in its first week. On June 28, Arashi released their 52nd single titled "Tsunagu", which was used as the theme song for the film Shinobi no Kuni. The single sold 389,000 copies in its first week and topped the Oricon weekly ranking. They also announced in July 2017 that they would embark on a five dome concert tour from November 17, 2017, to January 14, 2018.

On October 18, Arashi released their sixteenth studio album, Untitled. The regular edition contains 18 tracks, including 3 previously released singles, 4 unit songs, as well as Arashi's first attempt at a suite that incorporates melodies from various genres into a song of over 10 minutes and is said to represent the group's past, present, and future. The 53rd single will be released on November 8, 2017, titled "Doors (Yūki no Kiseki)" (Doors ～勇気の軌跡～). It will be used for Sho Sakurai's upcoming drama Saki ni Umareta Dake no Boku. The single also included a song titled "NOW or NEVER" which used as the theme song for Puzzle and Dragon commercial.

=== 2018: 20th Anniversary Tour ===
In 2018, the group started by announcing a new single titled "Find the Answer". The single was used as the theme song for the drama 99.9 Keiji Senmon Bengoshi – Season II starring Jun Matsumoto. The coupling song included in the regular edition, "Shiro ga Mau" (白が舞う), was used for Nippon Television Network's broadcast of the 2018 Winter Olympics in Pyeongchang, which featured Sho Sakurai as the main newscaster.

In November 2018, Arashi began their 20th Anniversary tour, the Arashi Anniversary Tour 5x20. They performed a total of 18 shows at the five major domes in Japan. On December 23, they announced an additional 32 dates, bringing the total scheduled performances to 50. With an expected 2.43 million total concert attendees, it is the group's largest tour to date, and also the largest tour in Japanese history. In addition, their 20th anniversary album was released on June 26, 2019, featuring all the singles from the group's 20-year history and their new song, "5x20". Arashi's concert tour featured more than 2 million Swarovski crystals in their backdrop, gondolas and costumes. The crystals used on the backdrop, were later given by them to all the members of their fan club as a present.

=== 2019: Hiatus announcement and 20th anniversary ===
On January 27, 2019, the group announced on their official fan club website that they would cease all group activities after December 31, 2020. The statement was published through a video where all five members of the group appeared together. The announcement trended on Twitter.

In October 2019, Arashi's channel on YouTube was opened with 5 official music videos: "Happiness", "Love So Sweet", "Monster", "Truth" and the one that is their signature song "A-RA-SHI", and later, live versions of the songs. In addition, on November 3, 2019, they made a live announcement in their YouTube channel of the release of the official social media (Facebook, Twitter, Instagram, TikTok and Weibo), as well as a new music video ("Turning up") and information about the international digital download and streaming of their musical catalogue.

They also announced a 2-day Asia tour called "Jet Storm", visiting Taipei, Jakarta, Singapore and Bangkok on November 9 to 11, as well as concert in Beijing for Spring 2020, through their official Instagram account. One day before the tour, on November 9, Arashi appeared before the new Emperor and Empress for the public celebration of his enthronement, participating in a congratulatory song called "Ray of water", singing the third part of it, "Journey to Harmony".

Arashi appeared at the opening ceremony of the (New) National Stadium, along with group Dreams Come True, in the event called "National Stadium Opening Event: Hello, Our Stadium" (『国立競技場オープニングイベント ～Hello, Our Stadium～, Kokuritsu kyōgi-ba Opening Event ~Hello, Our Stadium~), on December 21. They announced that, after that, and before the Tokyo Olympics in 2020, they would hold two concerts there, scheduled for May 15 and 16.

On December 13, 2019, Arashi announced a documentary about their career and their feelings as they approach the group's hiatus. The documentary, called Arashi's Diary ~Voyage~, would be distributed on Netflix worldwide from December 31. On December 23 they had a surprise for the fans, as their YouTube channel revealed a teaser video for the song "A-ra-shi: Reborn", in collaboration with the anime One Piece, which, as the group, also celebrated its 20th anniversary. The video has the 5 members of the group mingling with the crew from the anime, up until the moment when Arashi is to give a concert. The full video was released on January 4, 2020

=== 2020: Towards the hiatus and This Is Arashi ===
It was revealed on February 5, 2020, in their official site at Johnny's, that, on the 7th, they would be releasing all 16 albums (except for compilation and soundtrack albums) in digital form, in total, 256 songs.

On February 17, 2020, an announcement was made at their official Johnny's site about the cancellation of the concert that they had planned for Beijing in spring 2020. The cause referred to was the recent COVID-19 pandemic. The news was confirmed by the group via video shared in their official Weibo page, and later on covered by Sakurai Sho during his NTV's News Zero newscast.

As of April 17, 2020, Arashi announced that Arafes 2020 would have to be postponed due to the COVID-19 pandemic.

Arashi participated in the special online event We Are One: A Global Film Festival on June 3, 2020, with a musical performance. With a message in English, Arashi greeted the fans. Member Jun Matsumoto commented: “We prepared special performance videos. We can’t be there with you right now, but please enjoy online at home". Member Sho Sakurai continued with a grateful message to those in the frontline: “We’d also like to take this opportunity to thank all the medical workers and essential workers who put their lives at risk for us. Thank you from the bottom of our hearts”, before introducing the music videos, which included their song "Hope in the Darkness", never released before in digital form.

On September 15, on the official page at Johnny's net, an announcement was made that Arafes 2020 at National Stadium would be held, pending more information. Additionally, Arashi announced that their first album since 3 years and also the last before their hiatus, titled This Is Arashi, would be released on their 21st anniversary of their CD debut, November 3, 2020.

A collaboration with singer-songwriter Bruno Mars was announced on their social media and official page. The result, "Whenever You Call", the first full English song for the group, was released September 18.

On October 12, it was announced that Arafes 2020 would take place on November 3, Arashi's CD debut anniversary day. A special page opened for the event revealed that it would be an online concert, open to both fan club members and non-members. Several days later, an English page was opened, where audiences not belonging to the fan club could see the stream, also offering a choice of watching with English subtitles. The online concert was available in a repeat streaming from November 6 to 8. With this re-distribution, ticket sales were again open for people who had not bought on the original date, or for those that had bought from the Japanese site and had learned that the English site had English subtitles. As a result, an estimated 10 million people were able to watch the stream.

In a message to members of the fan club, posted on November 12, 2020, they revealed they would have a concert on December 31. The live performance concert, called "This Is Arashi", similar to Arafes 2020, was held with no audience, but with online live streaming. On November 12, 2020, their participation in Fuji TV's music program FNS Kayōsai was announced. This year would represent their 22nd appearance on the program, but the first to appear on both days.

On December 30, The group won the Special Honor Award at the 62nd Japan Record Awards.

Arashi was active until the last day before the hiatus. They announced on their official fan club a live concert for the 31st, while NHK's Kōhaku Uta Gassen announced their appearance on the 71st edition, making it the 12th time for them there.

=== 2021–2023: Hiatus ===
Although Arashi was on hiatus starting from 2021, back in November 2020, they announced via their official fan club that the fan club would continue delivering content, and they continued to make releases, although primarily compilations of their musical activities prior to the hiatus. Apart from Ohno, who wished to be absent from public appearances, the remaining Arashi members continued activities but as individuals, whether through variety shows, acting or on YouTube.

The Arashi concert film, Arashi Anniversary Tour 5×20 Film: Record of Memories had its world premiere at the 24th Shanghai International Film Festival on June 12, 2021. In a video message, member Jun Matsumoto said that due to the pandemic, many of their planned concerts could not take place and the film is a part of their gift of thanks to everyone who waited for them. The film was recognized as the first live film in history to reach No. 1 at the domestic box office, as well as being the No. 1 grossing live film of all time by a domestic artist. In March 2022, the film was redistributed in Japan, and screened also in the United States. On December 23, 2023 it was revealed that the film would be screened nationwide on New Years Eve, as a "vocal support screening", a first for Dolby Cinemas. It will display a special message from the group's members before the screening. They also released Arafes 2020 at National Stadium on Blu-ray and DVD on July 28, 2021. It topped the Oricon video chart with first-week sales of 647,783 copies.

Arashi had success on the charts in 2021 with the release of the digital albums Ura Ara Best (1999–2007, 2008–2011, 2012–2015, 2016–2020) and 5×20 All the Best!! 1999–2019 (Special Edition) on July 16. The five albums occupied the top five of the Oricon Weekly Digital Album Ranking chart in the week after release, making it the first time the band monopolized the top five on a Japanese chart.

Arashi released This Is Arashi Live 2020.12.31 on December 29, 2021. According to Oricon, it achieved first place in three video categories at the same time with first-week sales of 637,000 copies and with this, their works have had sales of more than 500,000 copies in the first week for nine consecutive years.

Until 2023, Arashi was one of the Johnny's groups that appeared in a large quantity of commercials, either as a group or as individuals. That ended in September, after the Johnny Kitagawa sexual assault hearings. Most of the businesses that held commercial contracts with Johnny's announced that they would stop using Johnny's talent in their commercials and promos, while only a few where considering to continue, depending on the agency's actions. Among the companies that decided to stop using Johnny's talent, either permanently or temporarily, that have ties to Arashi and the members, are Morinaga, Asahi, Tokio Marine Nichido, Kao, Daiichi Sankyo, and JAL. As of 14 September 2023, only Aflac Japan declared the possibility of an individual contract for Sakurai, while JCB recognized the 13-year history they had with Ninomiya and lamented having to let him go for the time being.

After the press conference given by J&A's new president and vicepresident, Noriyuki Higashiyama and Yoshihiko Inohara, respectively, on October 2, where the future of the agency was revealed, Sakurai, as Monday's newscaster in NTV's News Zero, the same day of the conference, revealed that the 5 members had been in contact and had been briefed about some of the decisions taken by the agency. When asked by main caster Yumiko Udo about the plans of the group, given the possibility of establishing individual or group contracts with the new agency that would be responsible of the talent, as stated in the conference, Sakurai replied, "Is it a contract between the new company and an individual corporation, or Arashi Co., Ltd.? Is it a contract with the group, the individual. or both? I think we need to put all the possible options on the table and think carefully." All members, except for Ohno, have continued to have individual works, so the decision taken could affect the outcome of the group as a whole.

Ninomiya announced he would become independent from the agency on 24 October 2023. Regarding his participation as member of Arashi, he said he would continue to work together with the rest when they resume activities, stating that he would continue being part of Arashi from the following day and as long as Arashi exists.

=== 2024: Hiatus in the year of the 25th Anniversary ===
The group donated ¥67.5 million yen to support the victims of the January 2024 Noto Peninsula earthquake. This came after discussions the members had on how they could provide assistance. Arashi posted a heartfelt message on their social media accounts, signing off with each one of the members' names at the end. The money came from the December 31, 2023 special screening of their concert movie "ARASHI Anniversary Tour 5×20 FILM “Record of Memories”"

On April 10, 2024, the fan club received a report that Arashi had established a company with the five members, that was later shared on Starto Entertainment's website. The report featured wording that referred to independent activities and decision-taking while considering the fans that have continued to support them. The news of this report resulted in spiking trends across SNS and social media that remained hopeful for news of the group's return to the music scene.

On April 12, 2024, Oricon released its "Reiwa Ranking" lists. Arashi's album "5×20 All the BEST!! 1999-2019' won first place in the "Album sales ranking" for the 5-year period, with over 2 million units sold. In the Music DVD / BluRay division, Arashi's "ARASHI Anniversary Tour 5×20" took the first place in the BluRay ranking, with 639,964 units sold, while it, "5×20 All the BEST!! CLIPS 1999-2019" and "Arafes 2020 at Japan's National Stadium" took the 3 top spots in the Music DVD / BluRay combined ranking, with a sales total of 1,073,982, 849,263 and 784,360 units, respectively.

On April 19, 2024, lawyer Takashi Shinomiya, representative director of Arashi's company, posted on his X (previously Twitter) that a group agent contract had been established between Arashi and Starto. A similar contract was established by Tokio, making Arashi the second group with a group agent contract with the new agency.

Although still on hiatus, and with no news about a return to the concert arenas, Arashi continued to be active behind the scenes, as they celebrated their 25th anniversary. In a message to their fan club, and later revealed through their social media, on September 15, 2024, Arashi shared 6 projects to celebrate their anniversary with the fans:

- 12 concerts that were in DVDs, made into Bluray to be released on November 3
- A live screening of their concert "ARASHI Anniversary Tour 5×10" in November 3 for fan club members, and November 6 for the general public. It was expected to be viewed 505 times in around 22 cinemas around Japan.
- The upload of ALL music videos in their YouTube channel on November 3
- A special edition of "5×20 All the BEST!! 1999-2019" in Dolby Atmos®
- Their song 'Kimi no Uta' made into a picture book, on sale November 3
- All starting on September 15, anniversary of their formation, with the opening of a special site, "My best Arashi", in which fans would be able to vote for their favorite 5 songs from among the 423 released so far.

=== 2025–2026: End of activities announcement and last concert tour ===
Ninomiya attended freelance announcer Tomoaki Ogura's memorial "Farewell Party" on March 17, 2025. Ogura was one of the first reporters to interview them on their debut day in Hawaii, was their co-host on Arashi's program "Arashi no Shukudai Kun" (2006–2010), covered Arashi's first concert in 2008, and kept an eye on their activities, both on and off the screen and stage, all the way to their hiatus. In an interview after the vigil, Ninomiya said that Ogura had been like a father for them. Sakurai had previously commented on behalf of the group when the news of Ogura's passing was reported in December 2024.

==== End of activities announcement ====
On May 6, 2025, Arashi announced that they would end activities as a group following a final tour in the spring of 2026. In their statement, the group said the surrounding environment and each member's individual circumstances had changed. They concluded they should all come together as Arashi to "hold a concert that would allow us to express our thanks directly with the kind of in-person performance," that had not been possible because of the COVID-19 pandemic, they added. They also mentioned that the fan club would stop accepting new memberships for the time being, to give preference of tickets to the current members, but that it would resume at a later date, until its closing in May 2026.

==== We are Arashi ====
On November 22, 2025, Arashi announced for their fan club the dates and form of their last concert tour. Starting on March 13, 2026 and ending on May 31, the group is to perform in a 5-dome concert tour. From the initial concerts in Sapporo, some airlines, trains and local buses opened new routes or new timeslots. Fans also noticed businesses getting on the trend by adorning their displays with Arashi colors.

In addition to the reveal of the final show being streamed, also for the general public, the group announced a digital album on streaming sites (not for download). We Are Arashi ~ Member selection is a collection of songs chosen by the members, together with comments by each one of them, released for a limited time.

On May 15, 2026, it was announced that the concert was going to be released on blu-ray and DVD on the group's debut anniversary, with the contents divided between a special fan club edition and a regular edition. The fan club edition includes a behind-the-scenes film, a 2025–2026 step–by–step of the production process, and fan club exclusive videos, called "Arashi Movie", previously shared on the site, that include members' birthday videos. The regular edition includes parts of the Osaka Kyocera Dome concerts on May 15–17, as well as the Tokyo Dome Final on May 31.

On May 13, 2026, it was revealed that their senior, Domoto member Tsuyoshi Domoto, had attended their concert in Osaka and was so moved by the rainbow–like ambiance typical of Arashi's concerts, that it inspired his new song "Heart of Rainbow", a message to the group and their fans, with feelings of 'thank you' and 'gratitude'. Their relationship started in 1997, when KinKi Kids (now Domoto) debuted with "Garasu no shōnen". Ninomiya (who calls him "big brother") and Aiba, both 14 years old and Johnny's Jr. members at the time, were backup dancers. In 2017, when he had to stop activities due to sudden hearing loss, Aiba and Matsumoto performed "Aisareru yori aishitai" together with Koichi Domoto on a TV music program. Matsumoto took over the lead role in the Kindaichi drama after Domoto. And Ohno, early in his career, referenced Domoto's dance form. An entertainment insider said about the song that Domoto, rather than viewing Arashi's end of activities negatively, sent the "rainbow" as a message of encouragement for an even brighter future, celebrating the new beginnings of each of the five members.

During his radio program on June 7, former Tokio member Masahiro Matsuoka commented that he was able to go to Arashi's last live performance at Tokyo Dome, and about his amazement at seeing the group being covered on so many newspapers and news programs. He said also that he was happy seeing so many people present at the same time as him witnessing the historic moment. He named Noriyuki Higashiyama, Kenichi Okamoto, Masayuki Sakamoto, Hiroshi Nagano, Yoshihiko Inohara and Kazuya Kamenashi, as being around or next to him, and Jun Hasegawa, and the members of the groups Hey! Say! JUMP and Super Eight as being there among the crowds. He recalled being called by Shun Oguri, who he had trouble identifying at first, as well as greeted by Junichi Okada. He also mentioned about talking about the concert with Ninomiya, who has become his "sauna buddy".

The tour spanned fifteen concerts in five cities, with an estimated total of people present in all of them at around 490,000. In total, since they debuted until the last concert, Arashi performed 595 times for a number of more than 17 million people. After the concert, the members, now in an empty venue, shared a last drink with the staff that had been supporting them for so many years, before going up to the stage for a quiet moment between themselves. The toast was reflected on Ninomiya's X account, as well as on Matsumoto's Instagram. Sakurai commented about this the following day on his newscast.

==== Five ====
On January 26, 2026, the group announced the release of a new single, Five, on March 4 in digital form and on March 31 on CD as a fan club exclusive. This would be their first recording after a 5-year hiatus. The digital single topped the "iTunes Music Single Top 100" chart the day of release. It was revealed that it had broken two records in the Oricon ranking chart, positioning in the top spot for the "Oricon Daily Streaming Ranking", with over 3.2 million streams in less than a day, surpassing their own song "Whenever You Call" (984,512 times, as of September 19, 2020) and in the "Oricon Daily Digital Single (Single) Ranking", with over 74,000 downloads, over their song "A-RA-SHI: Reborn" (55,583 downloads, as of December 20, 2019). The combined total of streams has made "Five" the all–time highest ranked in Oricon history. It was also revealed that the single had topped NIQ/GfK Japan streaming play count report on Billboard Japan's site with over 4.4 million registered views. On March 11, Oricon revealed its weekly chart. Arashi's digital single Five continued in the first spot, with a total of 133,204 downloads, and over 13.1 million streams. The single also reached the 2nd spot in the combined rank.

On June 6, 2026, Billboard Japan named "Five" as the top song in the "Song download" category for the first half of the year, with over 162,000 downloads. The song was downloaded over 123,000 times during its first week, obtaining the top spot in the charts. It maintained a steady movement in the upper rankings, finishing 13th on the chart registered on May 27.

== Post–end activities ==
On September 3, 2026, it was announced that Arashi would release a new documentary, this time on Amazon Prime Video. 5: The Time Called Arashi started streaming worldwide on December 15. The content of the documentary is the group's activities in preparation up to their last concert, held on May 31, 2026, at Tokyo Dome, marking the end of activities of the group. Hirokazu Kore-eda, known for films such as *Shoplifters* and *Monster*, serves as general director. Film directors will be Kohei Imanaka and Mami Sunada of Bunbuku, a video production group led by Kore-eda. The streaming service also announced the release for December 21 of ARASHI LIVE TOUR 2026 "We are ARASHI -Prime Video Edition-", footage of said concert, edited especially for the streamer. In addition, archives of 9 past concerts were also to be sequentially released, starting on September 15.

As of October 31, 2026, Arashi's YouTube channel registered 3.88 million subscribers, and 1,887,165,751 views of their 136 uploaded videos, with a marked rise after the "end of activities announcement" date.

== Discography ==
Studio albums

- Arashi No.1 Ichigou: Arashi wa Arashi o Yobu! (2001)
- Here We Go! (2002)
- How's It Going? (2003)
- Iza, Now! (2004)
- One (2005)
- Arashic (2006)
- Time (2007)
- Dream "A" Live (2008)
- Boku no Miteiru Fūkei (2010)
- Beautiful World (2011)
- Popcorn (2012)
- Love (2013)
- The Digitalian (2014)
- Japonism (2015)
- Are You Happy? (2016)
- Untitled (2017)
- This Is Arashi (2020)

== Filmography ==
=== Dramas and Films ===
A short Fuji TV drama called V no Arashi became one of the group's first activities together as it was broadcast just about a month after the announcement of their formation in Hawaii. Although it would not be until 2010 would the group act in another drama together titled Saigo no Yakusoku, they have worked together on movies in 2002, 2004, and 2007.

=== Variety programs ===
Since 2001, Arashi hosted their own variety shows, starting with Mayonaka no Arashi on NTV, where announcer Shinichi Hatori was the moderator. After that, they had a string of shows that aired late-night, midnight: C no Arashi, D no Arashi, G no Arashi, and Arashi no Shukudai-kun.

Arashi was also a regular afternoon presence on Fuji TV as they had a string of shows that aired around 1:00 p.m. (JST) since 2002: Nama Arashi: Live Storm, Arashi no Waza-Ari, Mago Mago Arashi and Golden Rush Arashi (GRA). VS Arashi, started in 2008, was moved from an afternoon timeslot to Golden Time in 2009

Besides their NTV Odoroki no Arashi! Seiki no Jikken Gakusha Mo Yosoku Fukanō (驚きの嵐!世紀の実験 学者も予測不可能, Surprising Arashi! Experiments of the Century: Impossible for Scholars to Predict) television specials that would air almost twice a year around 7:00 p.m. (JST), Arashi did not have any variety shows that aired during primetime until TBS gave the group their first primetime show titled Himitsu no Arashi-chan in 2008. In 2010, NTV began to broadcast another Arashi-hosted primetime show titled Arashi ni Shiyagare, which aired every Saturday at 10:00 p.m JST. With the impending cease of activities closing in, NTV revealed that Arashi ni Shiyagare would stop airing by the end of 2020.

Though at the beginning their shows were not very popular, getting low ratings no matter what they tried, by the end, the group had hosted all kinds of actors, singers and athletes, including international ones, such as Will Smith, Tommy Lee Jones, Tom Cruise, Cameron Diaz, Cristiano Ronaldo and Neymar.

== Endorsements ==
Many of Arashi's singles have been used as theme songs for their dramas (such as Ninomiya's Stand Up!! and Ohno's Maō), movies (such as Matsumoto's Hana Yori Dango Final and Sakurai's Yatterman), and commercials. Arashi has endorsed products for different companies.

Arashi has appeared in food, beverage and beer commercials, such as Coca-Cola, House Foods, and McDonald's.

In 2008 the members of Arashi became commercial representatives for au by KDDI, a mobile phone company.

In 2010, the members first appeared in commercials for Nintendo, promoting the game Wii Party. The group appeared in commercials promoting Mario Kart 7 in 2011.

In 2012, Arashi appeared in a commercial promoting the Nissan Serena, featuring their song "Kakenukero!" (from Popcorn) as the theme song.

=== Culture and Tourism ===
On April 8, 2010, the Japan Tourism Agency appointed Arashi as the navigators for their "Japan Endless Discovery" national tourism campaign. Arashi appeared in commercials, which aired in East Asia, to encourage people from overseas to visit Japan.

In December 2019, Arashi was appointed goodwill ambassador to China, to help promote cultural and sports exchanges with them, before the Olympics, from January 2020 until the end of the year. The Japanese Foreign Ministry explained that the group, selected based on their popularity in both countries, could play a key role in accelerating people-to-people exchanges between the countries. The Chinese Embassy in Tokyo congratulated Arashi via Twitter, while Arashi posted the information on their official Weibo page.

=== Japan Airlines ===
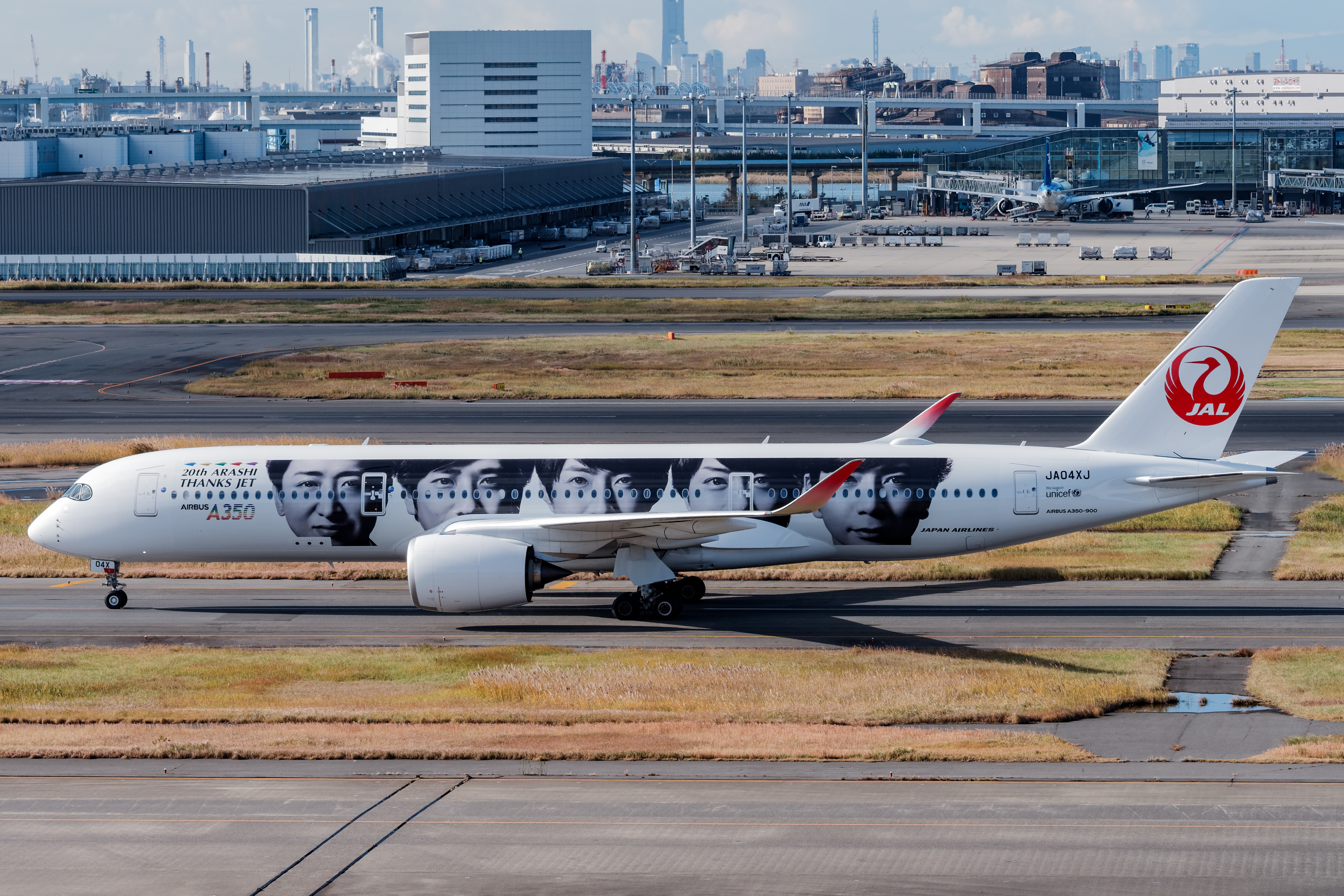
Arashi Meets A350 jet at Haneda International Airport

Arashi began their collaboration with Japan Airlines in 2010 appearing in several campaigns, including commercial ads and having their portraits featured on a series of planes. Ohno's art was displayed in Japan Airlines' "JAL Fly to 2020" Olympic campaign in 2015, as part of the design on the planes. Following the theme, "Hope for the future," the images on the aircraft included colorful flowers, Mt. Fuji, the four seasons, and people looking into the future, with Arashi's faces in the center of the design, under a five member-colored rainbow. JAL's Fly to 2020 aircraft operated from 27 June 2015 until 10 April 2016. In 2016, the ads showed Miyajidake Shrine.

Arashi celebrated their 20th anniversary with a collaboration campaign called "Arashi Thanks" (it included the "Arashi Thanks Jet" which showed the members' images from 2010) in 2019. This was followed by "Arashi Meets A350" (「嵐 Meets A350」), beginning on January 13, 2020 with JAL's official YouTube channel release of the main ad, and the "making of" video the following day. Following the group's hiatus announcement and because of the COVID-19 pandemic, members Matsumoto and Sakurai took over with an ad campaign series for the airline's economy fare line in 2021, promoting local tourism. Among the songs used for the campaigns were "movin' on" (2010), "Yume ni Kakeru" (2016), and "Sky again" (2018),

=== Olympics ===
In 2004, "Hero" was used as the theme song for the 2004 Summer Olympics news coverage on NTV. In 2008, "Kaze no Mukō e" was used for the 2008 Summer Olympics on NTV. In 2010, their song "Yurase, Ima o" was used as the theme song for the 2010 Winter Olympics coverage on NTV. For NTV's coverage of the 2012 Summer Olympics, the theme song was "Akashi" (from Popcorn). For the Tokyo 2020 Olympics, Arashi collaborated with singer-songwriter Kenshi Yonezu on a new song titled "Kite." The song made its official debut on the NHK year-end show Kōhaku Uta Gassen, and was considered as the network's support song for the games' broadcast as well as their sports programs.

=== Commercials ===
Additional information CM

- Bourbon Corp.
  - Petit Bourbon (2000–2002)
- Coca-Cola Bottlers Japan Holdings
  - Coca Cola (2003)
- Hawaii state government
  - "Stand Up, Hawaii!!" campaign (2002)
- House Foods
  - Ozack (2003–2005)
  - Tongari Corn (2007–2008, 2010–2011)
- House Wellness Foods
  - C1000 (beverage)
- KDDI
  - au by KDDI (2008–2011)
- Kirin Company
  - Kirin Brewery Co., Ltd Tanrei Green Label (January 2010–December 2013), Ichiban shibori (January 2014–August 2017)
- McDonald's Japan (2001)
- Morinaga Milk Industry
  - Eskimo Pino (2002–2003)
- Nintendo
  - Wii Party, Mario Kart 7, Nintendo 3DS, other Nintendo campaigns in pairs and individually
- Nissan Motor Co., Ltd.
  - Nissan cars
  - Nissan Serena
- Parco Co., Ltd.
  - Parco Grand Bazaar (2004)

== Other activities ==
=== Charity ===
In 2004, the group was appointed to be the main personality supporters for NTV's 27th annual telethon 24-Hour Television. With the theme being "Your Dream is Everybody's Dream" (あなたの夢はみんなの夢, Anata no Yume wa Minna no Yume), it was broadcast live for about twenty-four hours from August 21 to 22. In 2008, Arashi was once again the main personality supporters for the telethon. The 31st annual 24-Hour Television focused on the theme of "Vow: The Most Important Promise" (誓い～一番大切な約束～, Chikai: Ichiban Taisetsu na Yakusoku), and it was broadcast live from August 30 to 31. The telethon raised ¥1,083,666,922 (approx. US$11,902,822.61) in donations, which is the second-highest amount of donations in 24-Hour Television history to date. In 2012, Arashi was chosen to host the annual telethon, making it their third time being appointed as the main personality for the program. The program was focused on the theme "Future" (未来, Mirai) and raised ¥1,168,471,704 (approx. US$14,000,394.26) in donations. In 2013, Arashi was once again chosen as the main personalities of the telethon, making them the first to take this role for two consecutive years and their fourth overall. The 36th annual 24-Hour Television focuses on the theme of "What is Japan...? ~the shape of this country~" (ニッポンって…？ ～この国のかたち～, Nippon tte...? ~Kono Kuni no Katachi~). In 2019, Arashi hosted 24-Hour Television for the 5th time (2004, 2008, 2012, 2013, 2019) (24時間テレビ)

On November 4, 2011, Arashi reportedly donated approximately 300 million yen to the disaster-stricken regions in northern Japan. The group split their donations between the Iwate, Miyagi, and Fukushima prefectures, with each one receiving about 100 million yen. About 50 million yen comprises the members’ total royalties received from the sale of the pocket edition of their book Nippon no Arashi. The remaining amount comes from the publisher's revenues on the book and from the sale of goods at their charity event at Tokyo Dome in June.

On February 22, 2012, Arashi visited the temporary houses in Shichigahama, Miyagi and spoke with victims of the disaster. They also held a mini concert for 500 people, singing 11 songs over a period of one hour and shaking hands with everyone who attended.

On May 13, 2020, it was reported that Arashi and other Johnny's artists would be included in the temporary unit "Twenty★Twenty", as part of Johnny's charity project "Smile Up Project", to sing the song "Smile", written by Mr. Children's Kazutoshi Sakurai. The single was released in digital form on June 22, and on CD on August 12.

On August 4, 2026, via their company's official SNS, it was announced that they (as Arashi Inc.) had made a ¥50 million donation in favor of the 2026 Kumamoto earthquake recovery efforts.

=== Waku-Waku School of Arashi ===
After the 2011 Tohoku earthquake in March, Arashi considered canceling their "ARASHI LIVE TOUR Beautiful World" concerts scheduled from June 24 to 26, 2011, at Tokyo Dome. However, in April, they decided to use those three days to hold charity events instead. Part of the proceeds from a possible total audience of 225,000 were donated to charity. The release of a pocket-sized version of their book Nippon no Arashi, which originally distributed to 40,000 schools in 2010, was also announced on May 19, 2011. All of the revenue was donated to charity.

As part of that tour, Arashi started the Waku-Waku School of Arashi(ja) as a charity event, and repeated it every year since until 2019. In all of the events, one of the members would offer the "class" as teacher, while the rest of the members acted as students. Starting in 2015, other Johnny's groups' members would participate as students / assistants to Arashi.

- WAKU-WAKU SCHOOL OF ARASHI 2011 － 5 Classes to Make Each Day Shine Brighter－ (Tokyo Dome, June 24/26, 2011)
  - Ninomiya-sensei "Heart pounding (Body) lesson"
  - Matsumoto-sensei "Shock! (Electricity/Energy) lesson"
  - Aiba-sensei "Munching (Food) lesson"
  - Sakurai-sensei "Clapping (Giving Praise) lesson"
  - Ohno-sensei "Hello (Expressing Thanks) lesson"
- WAKU-WAKU SCHOOL OF ARASHI 2012 － 5 Classes to Make Each Day Shine Brighter－ (Tokyo Dome, June 16 & 17, and Kyocera Dome Osaka, July 14/16)
  - Ninomiya-sensei "Hard Headed (Stretching the Mind) lesson"
  - Sakurai-sensei "Gulping (Water) lesson"
  - Aiba-sensei " Munching (Food) lesson"
  - Matsumoto-sensei "In the first place (Beginnings) lesson"
  - Ohno-sensei "Ha Ha (Laughter) lesson"
- WAKU-WAKU SCHOOL OF ARASHI 2013 － 5 Classes to Make Each Day Shine Brighter－(Tokyo Dome, June 29 & 30, and Kyocera Dome Osaka, July 13 & 14)
  - Ninomiya-sensei "Zzzzz (Sleep) lesson"
  - Sakurai-sensei "Cha Ching (Money) lesson"
  - Aiba-sensei "Munching (Food) lesson"
  - Matsumoto-sensei "Tick tock (Time) lesson"
  - Ohno-sensei "Lively (Individuality/Friends) lesson”
- WAKU-WAKU SCHOOL OF ARASHI 2014 － Camping out at the Dome to strengthen friendships －(Tokyo Dome, June 28 & 29, and Kyocera Dome Osaka, June 7 & 8)
  - Ninomiya-sensei "It is wonderful to join forces with friends"
  - Sakurai-sensei "The right way to make friends"
  - Aiba-sensei "Eat lunch with your friends to get to know them better"
  - Matsumoto-sensei "Thinking about our friends"
  - Ohno-sensei "Encounters and Nurturing"
- WAKU-WAKU SCHOOL OF ARASHI 2015 － Lessons about the 4 Seasons to Make Japan More Enjoyable－ (Tokyo Dome, June 27 & 28, and Kyocera Dome Osaka, June 6 & 7)
  (Guest Students / Assistants: Hey! Say! JUMP)
  - Ninomiya-sensei "Early summer 'Japanese people and rice making'"
  - Matsumoto-sensei "Mid-summer 'Inheriting tradition and passing it on to the next generation'"
  - Ohno-sensei "Fall 'Japan's tea ceremony and hospitality'"
  - Aiba-sensei "Winter 'Year end and New Year's Eve'"
  - Sakurai-sensei "New Year 'Call forth good fortune for the new year! & Remember your new year's resolutions'"
- WAKU-WAKU SCHOOL OF ARASHI 2016 － 5 Research Projects to Make Each Day Shine Brighter －(Tokyo Dome, June 25 & 26, and Kyocera Dome Osaka, June 18 & 19)
  (Guest Students / Assistants: Johnny's WEST)
  - Ninomiya-sensei "Important lessons we can learn from the toilet paper core”
  - Matsumoto-sensei "A person with good luck, a person with bad luck – the true nature of luck"
  - Ohno-sensei "The more you know about fish, the tastier they are"
  - Aiba-sensei "Core strengthening – how it can make your everyday life healthier"
  - Sakurai-sensei "Considering the present and the future, beyond the starry skies"
- WAKU-WAKU SCHOOL OF ARASHI 2017 － Health Education for a Brighter Future – (Tokyo Dome, July 7 & 8, and Kyocera Dome Osaka, June 17 & 18)
  (Guest Students / Assistants: Sexy Zone)
  - Aiba-sensei "Learning to love exercise (Sports)"
  - Matsumoto-sensei "Making nervousness work in your favor"
  - Ninomiya-sensei "The foundation of human beings – digestive health"
  - Ohno-sensei "Why do people cry? The effects of tears"
  - Sakurai-sensei "Considering masculinity and femininity"
- WAKU-WAKU SCHOOL OF ARASHI 2018 － 5 Club Activities to Make Each Day Shine Brighter－(Tokyo Dome, June 30 & July 1, and Kyocera Dome Osaka, June 9 & 10)
  (Guest Students / Assistants, called this time club members: Sexy Zone)
  - Aiba Captain "Occult studies club"
  - Matsumoto club leader "Touching soil club"
  - Ninomiya club leader "Exploration club"
  - Ohno club leader "Sweets club"
  - Sakurai club leader "Dodge ball club"

Until 2018, the Waku-Waku School of Arashi events raised over ¥2 billion (US$180 million) in donations.

- WAKU-WAKU SCHOOL OF ARASHI 2019 – Jump the time and space – (Tokyo Dome, June 29, and Kyocera Dome Osaka, June 23)
  (Guest Students / Assistants: Hey! Say! JUMP)
  - Aiba-sensei "Hawaii and Arashi"
  - Matsumoto-sensei "Costumes/Fashion"
  - Ninomiya-sensei "Music"
  - Ohno-sensei "Dance"
  - Sakurai-sensei "Photography"

This year was to be considered the last of Arashi's participation in the Waku-Waku School of Arashi series, with the members hoping one of the Johnny's groups would take over. But in 2020, they would be moved to re-open it for the last time before going on hiatus, to help out the medical staff attending patients in the COVID-19 pandemic. In this occasion, fans from both the fan club and general public could get to see the Arashi sensei and students online, through a pay service established by Johnny's group's social service "Smile Up! Project". Fan club members would get to see it several days before the general audience.

- WAKU-WAKU SCHOOL OF ARASHI 2020 – Be aware every day – (Online – through Johnny's Net's Fan Club access for members, and a still undisclosed way for general public)
  - Aiba-sensei "Let's move the body"
  - Matsumoto-sensei "Let's think about the meaning of 'waiting'"
  - Ninomiya-sensei "Let's say thanks now"
  - Ohno-sensei "Let's draw a picture"
  - Sakurai-sensei "Let's know about the new coronavirus"
    All viewings are on individual days, starting with the class given by Ninomiya on May 2 for fan club members and on the 8th for general public, and last about 20 minutes.

== Magazine reprints ==
Arashi outsold many of the magazines they appeared in, resulting in an unexpected event: publishers having to reprint their magazines. The first magazine reprint was of ANAN issue 1693, released on January 20, 2010, with Sakurai on the cover. Until then, it was said that "reprinting a weekly magazine is impossible" because the next issue would come out while the magazine was being reprinted, due to the publication cycle of weekly magazines. However, the sales were so high that it was impossible to overturn this common sense. Bookstores continued to sell out even after printing more than twice the usual number of copies. Another magazine that was reprinted was the 35th anniversary special issue of the idol magazine "POTATO" in 2018, when Arashi appeared on the cover. Another one was NHK's "Minna no Uta April/May issue", released on March 18, 2020, which was reprinted before its release, with the first edition having six times the usual number of copies. The latest, as of June 2025, is Casa Brutus, with Sakurai on the cover. This one has been reprinted three times, a first for that publication.

== Awards and nominations ==
=== Oricon ===
In 2009, Oricon declared Arashi the best-selling artist of the year and awarded them the "Artist Top Sales" (ATS) award with 14.46 billion yen (approx. US$172,875,357.81) worth of total sales in the singles, album, music DVD, and music Blu-ray categories. In 2010, Arashi became Japan's top-selling artist for the second year in a row, with more than 17.16 billion yen (approx. US$204,321,424) worth of sales in seven categories: total gross sales for an artist, total gross single sales for an artist, copies sold for an album, gross sales for an album, copies sold for a music DVD, gross sales for a music DVD, and total gross music DVD sales for an artist. In the "52nd Oricon Annual Ranking 2019", Arashi was awarded the prize for the highest in total sales by artist of the year, for their album 5×20 All the Best!! 1999–2019 and the video clip collection 5×20 All the BEST!! 1999–2019, which, combined, sold over 20.33 billion yen in the album, music DVD, and music Blu-ray categories. The album had become the first double million seller by September for both Arashi and Johnny's Office.

In 2026, with the release of the digital single "Five", Arashi broke their own record, with over 3.2 million streams (surpassing "Whenever You Call" (984,512)), and 74,000 downloads (surpassing "A-RA-SHI: Reborn" (55,583)) in less than a day. They continued on the top spot for the first week of the Oricon streaming and download charts, with over 13.3 million streams and 133,204 downloads.

The group dominated the Oricon streaming rankings chart after the end of the last concert, with "Kansha Kangeki Ame Arashi" topping the chart, followed by "Kotoba Yori Taisetsuna Mono" (#2), "My Girl" (#3), "Love Rainbow" (#4), "Believe" (#5), "A-RA-SHI" (#6), "Troublemaker" (#7), "Wild at Heart" (#8), Meikyuu Love Song (#9) and "Monster" rounding out the top 10 in the chart for June 8. This continued for a second week, as announced on June 11, for Oricon's June 15 chart.

=== Billboard Japan Music Awards ===
The Billboard Japan Music Awards is an annual music awards ceremony established by Billboard. Arashi has received eleven awards.

Year	Nominee / work	Award	Result
2010	"Troublemaker"	Hot 100 of the Year	Won
2010	"Troublemaker"	Hot 100 Singles Sales of the Year	Won
2012	Arashi	Top Pop Artist	Won
2013	Love	Top Album of the Year	Won
2013	Arashi	Top Pop Artist	Won
2014	"Guts!"	Hot 100 of the Year	Won
2015	"Aozora no Shita, Kimi no Tonari"	Top Single Sales of the Year	Won
2015	Japonism	Top Album of the Year	Won
2016	Are You Happy?	Top Album of the Year	Won
2019	5x20 All the Best!! 1999–2019	Hot Album of the Year	Won
2019	5x20 All the Best!! 1999–2019	Top Album Sales of the Year	Won

=== Guinness World records ===
Biggest-selling album worldwide is a yearly recognition by Guinness World Records, the primary international authority on the cataloguing and verification of top rankers and record breakers since 1955.

Year	Nominee / work	Award	Result
2020	5x20 All the Best!! 1999–2019	Biggest-selling album worldwide (current year)	Won

=== International Federation of the Phonographic Industry (IFPI) ===
The Global Top Album of the Year is an award established by the International Federation of the Phonographic Industry in 2014.

Year	Nominee / work	Award	Result
2020	5x20 All the Best!! 1999–2019	Global Top Album of 2019	Won

=== Japan Gold Disc Awards ===
The Japan Gold Disc Awards is an annual music awards ceremony established by the Recording Industry Association of Japan in 1987. Arashi has received fifty-eight awards. They hold the record for the most wins in the Artist of the Year category with seven wins.

Year	Nominee / work	Award	Result
2008	"Love So Sweet"	The Best 10 Singles	Won
2009	"Truth/Kaze no Mukō e"	Single of the Year	Won
2009	"Truth/Kaze no Mukō e"	The Best 10 Singles	Won
2009	"One Love"	The Best 10 Singles	Won
2009	"Beautiful Days"	The Best 10 Singles	Won
2009	Summer Tour 2007 Final Time	The Best Music Videos	Won
2010	Arashi	Artist of the Year	Won
2010	"Believe/Kumorinochi, Kaisei"	Single of the Year	Won
2010	"Believe/Kumorinochi, Kaisei"	The Best 5 Singles	Won
2010	"Ashita no Kioku/Crazy Moon"	The Best 5 Singles	Won
2010	"Everything"	The Best 5 Singles	Won
2010	"My Girl"	The Best 5 Singles	Won
2010	All the Best! 1999–2009	Album of the Year	Won
2010	All the Best! 1999–2009	The Best 5 Albums	Won
2010	Arashi Around Asia 2008 in Tokyo	The Best Music Videos	Won
2010	5x10 All the Best! Clips 1999–2009	The Best Music Videos	Won
2011	Arashi	Artist of the Year	Won
2011	Boku no Miteiru Fūkei	Album of the Year	Won
2011	Boku no Miteiru Fūkei	The Best 5 Albums	Won
2011	"Troublemaker"	The Best 5 Singles	Won
2011	"Monster"	The Best 5 Singles	Won
2011	Arashi Anniversary Tour 5x10	The Best Music Videos	Won
2012	Beautiful World	The Best 5 Albums	Won
2012	Arashi 10–11 Tour "Scene": Kimi to Boku no Miteiru Fūkei – Stadium	The Best Music Videos	Won
2012	Arashi 10–11 Tour "Scene": Kimi to Boku no Miteiru Fūkei – Dome+	The Best Music Videos	Won
2013	Arashi Live Tour Beautiful World	The Best Music Videos	Won
2014	Love	Album of the Year	Won
2014	Love	Best 5 Albums	Won
2014	Arashi Live Tour Popcorn	Best Music Videos	Won
2014	Arashi Arafes National Stadium 2012	Best Music Videos	Won
2015	Arashi	Artist of the Year	Won
2015	The Digitalian	Best 5 Albums	Won
2015	Arashi Arafes '13 National Stadium 2013	Best Music Videos	Won
2015	Arashi Live Tour 2013 "Love"	Best Music Videos	Won
2016	Arashi	Artist of the Year	Won
2016	Japonism	Album of the Year	Won
2016	Japonism	Best 5 Albums	Won
2016	Arashi Blast in Hawaii	Best Music Videos	Won
2016	Arashi Live Tour 2014 The Digitalian	Best Music Videos	Won
2017	Arashi	Artist of the Year	Won
2017	Are You Happy?	Best 5 Albums	Won
2017	Arashi Blast in Miyagi	Best Music Videos	Won
2017	Arashi Live Tour 2015 Japonism	Best Music Videos	Won
2018	Untitled	Best 5 Albums	Won
2018	Arashi Live Tour 2016–2017 Are You Happy?	Best Music Videos	Won
2019	Arashi Live Tour 2017–2018 Untitled	Best Music Videos	Won
2020	Arashi	Artist of the Year	Won
2020	5x20 All the Best!! 1999–2019	Album of the Year	Won
2020	5x20 All the Best!! 1999–2019	Best 5 Albums	Won
2020	5x20 All the Best!! Clips 1999–2019	Best Music Videos	Won
2021	Arashi	Artist of the Year	Won
2021	This is Arashi	Best 5 Albums	Won
2021	"Kite"	Best 5 Singles	Won
2021	Arashi Anniversary Tour 5x20	Music Video of the Year	Won
2021	Arashi Anniversary Tour 5x20	Best 3 Music Videos	Won
2022	Arafes 2020 at National Stadium	Music Video of the Year	Won
2022	Arafes 2020 at National Stadium	Best 3 Music Videos	Won
2022	This is Arashi Live 2020.12.31	Best 3 Music Videos	Won

=== Japan Record Awards ===
The Japan Record Awards is a major music awards show held annually in Japan by the Japan Composer's Association. Arashi's agency, Johnny & Associates, have declined nominations to the Japan Record Awards since 1990, however, at the 2020 ceremony, Arashi was honored with the newly created Special Honor Award, an award that recognizes prominent figures who have garnered widespread support throughout the years and contributed greatly to the development of music as culture.

Year	Nominee / work	Award	Result
2020	Arashi	Special Honor Award	Won

=== Music Awards Japan ===
The Music Awards Japan (MAJ) is the largest international music awards in Japan, organized by the Culture and Entertainment Industry Promotion Association (CEIPA), a general incorporated association established by five major music industry organizations: the Recording Industry Association of Japan, the Japan Music Enterprises Association, the Federation of Japanese Music Producers, the Japan Music Publishers Association, and the Japan Concert Promoters Association.

Year	Nominated work	Category	Result	Notes
2025	"Love So Sweet"	Best Domestic Idol Culture Song Award	Nominated	Award ceremony: May 21–22, 2025

=== Television Drama Academy Awards ===
The Television Drama Academy Awards is a quarterly Japanese drama awards ceremony held by the magazine The Television. Arashi has received fifteen awards from twenty-eight nominations.

Year	Nominee / work	Award	Result
2001	"Jidai"	Best Theme Song	Won
2002	"A Day in Our Life"	Best Theme Song	Nominated
2003	"Kotoba Yori Taisetsu na Mono"	Best Theme Song	Nominated
2004	"Hitomi no Naka no Galaxy"	Best Theme Song	Nominated
2007	"We Can Make It!"	Best Theme Song	Nominated
2007	"Happiness"	Best Theme Song	Nominated
2008	"Beautiful Days"	Best Theme Song	Won
2009	"Ashita no Kioku"	Best Theme Song	Won
2009	"My Girl"	Best Theme Song	Nominated
2010	"Troublemaker"	Best Theme Song	Nominated
2010	"Monster"	Best Theme Song	Won
2010	"Love Rainbow"	Best Theme Song	Won
2011	"Hatenai Sora"	Best Theme Song	Won
2012	"Wild at Heart"	Best Theme Song	Won
2012	"Face Down"	Best Theme Song	Won
2012	"Your Eyes"	Best Theme Song	Nominated
2013	"Endless Game"	Best Theme Song	Won
2014	"Bittersweet"	Best Theme Song	Won
2014	"Daremo Shiranai"	Best Theme Song	Won
2014	"Guts!"	Best Theme Song	Nominated
2015	"Sakura"	Best Theme Song	Won
2015	"Aozora no Shita, Kimi no Tonari"	Best Theme Song	Won
2016	"I Seek"	Best Theme Song	Nominated
2016	"Daylight"	Best Theme Song	Won
2017	"I'll Be There"	Best Theme Song	Nominated
2018	"Doors (Yūki no Kiseki)"	Best Theme Song	Won
2018	"Find the Answer"	Best Theme Song	Nominated
2018	"Kimi no Uta"	Best Theme Song	Nominated

=== Weibo Starlight Awards ===
Year	Nominee / work	Award	Result
2020	Arashi	Microblogging New Artist of the Year	Won
2020	Arashi	Influencer (Asia-Pacific)	Won

=== Dolby Cinema Japan Awards ===
Year	Nominee / work	Award	Result
2024	Arashi Anniversary Tour 5×20 FILM “Record of Memories”	Live Music Category	Won

== See also ==
- Album era
- List of best-selling music artists in Japan
