= One (Arashi album) =

Studio album by Arashi
- Released: August 3, 2005
- Recorded: 2005
- Genre: Pop, rock, R&B
- Length: 52:00 (Limited edition); 57:04 (Regular edition)
- Label: J Storm

Arashi chronology
5x5 The Best Selection of 2002–2004 (2004)	One (2005)	Arashic (2006)

Singles from One
- 1. "Sakura Sake" Released: March 23, 2005

One is the fifth studio album of the Japanese boy band Arashi. The album was released on August 3, 2005 in Japan in two editions: a limited CD+DVD version and a regular CD version. It was released digitally on February 7, 2020.

== Content ==
One album is the group's first album to contain officially recorded solo songs of each member. The album contains the single "Sakura Sake", which was used for the commercial of Jōnan Kōko featuring member Sho Sakurai as the spokesperson. The regular edition contains a bonus track, while the limited edition contains a DVD and a 32-page booklet.

== Track listing ==
CD
No.	Title	Lyrics	Music	Arrangement	Length
1.	"Overture"	Sho Sakurai	Masayuki Iwata	Iwata	2:20
2.	"Natsu no Namae"	Hamai; Sakurai	Katsuyuki Harada	Ha-j; Taku Yoshioka	4:34
3.	"Romance"	HigherF	Joey Carbone	Naoki Ōtsubo	3:44
4.	"Lai-Lai-Lai"	Spin	Takeshi Isozaki	Ha-j; Yoshioka	3:46
5.	"Days"	Gyo Kitagawa	Ayumi Miyazaki	Seikō Nakaoka	3:41
6.	"Subarashiki Sekai"	Kazunari Ohno; Spin; Sakurai	Noriyoshi Matsushita	Tomoki Ishizuka	4:14
7.	"Sakura Sake"	Takeshi Aida; Sakurai	Shin Tanimoto	Ishizuka	4:20
8.	"Rain" (Satoshi Ohno solo)	IntoGroove	Peter Bjorklund; Joel Eriksson	Jun Abe	3:31
9.	"Itsuka no Summer" (Masaki Aiba solo)	Erykah	Tsukasa	Ishizuka	3:59
10.	"W/Me" (Jun Matsumoto solo)	Axel G	Peter Björklund	Ha-j; Yoshioka	3:14
11.	"Himitsu" (Kazunari Ninomiya solo)	Simon Isogai	Isogai	Ishizuka	4:42
12.	"Yume de Ii Kara" (Sho Sakurai solo)	Shintaro Kurihara; Masayoshi Ohga	Hiroshi Odawara	Abe	4:52
13.	"Yes? No?"	Ma-saya; Sakurai	Shusui; Stefan Engblom; Axel Belinder	Shusui; Engblom; Belinder	5:26
14.	"Kazamidori" (Bonus track, regular edition only)	Kazuo Yoda	Yoda	Iwata	5:03
Total length:					57:04

DVD
No.	Title	Length
1.	"Making of One Documentary"

== Chart positions ==
Chart (2005–2019)	Peak position
Japan Oricon album Weekly Chart	1
Japan Billboard Japan Top Album Sales	66

== Certifications ==
Country	Provider	Sales	Certification
Japan	RIAJ	121,187	Gold

== Release history ==
Release history and formats for One
Country	Date	Label	Format	Catalog
Japan	August 3, 2005	J Storm	CD	JACA-5025
Japan	August 3, 2005	J Storm	CD+DVD	JACA-5024
