= Aozora Pedal =

Single by Arashi

from the album Time
- B-side: "Kiss kara Hajimeyō"; "Natsu no Owari ni Omou Koto"
- Released: August 2, 2006
- Genre: Pop
- Label: J Storm
- Songwriter(s): Shikao Suga

Arashi singles chronology
"Kitto Daijōbu" (2006)	"Aozora Pedal" (2006)	"Love So Sweet" (2007)

"Aozora Pedal" (アオゾラペダル, Blue Sky Pedal) is the seventeenth single of the Japanese boy band Arashi. The single was released in three editions: a regular edition containing a bonus track and karaoke versions of all the songs released in the single, and two limited editions containing either a DVD with the music video or the making-of video of the song.

== Single information ==
"Aozora Pedal" was used as the theme song for the movie Honey and Clover starring Arashi member Sho Sakurai, Yū Aoi and Yūsuke Iseya.

== Track listing ==
Regular Edition
No.	Title	Lyrics	Music	Arrangement	Length
1.	"Aozora Pedal"	Shikao Suga	Suga	Tomoki Ishizuka	5:21
2.	"Kiss kara Hajimeyō"	Youth Case	Velvetronica	Ha-j	4:30
3.	"Natsu no Owari ni Omou Koto"	Takashi Ogawa	Kōji Ueno	Ueno	4:04
4.	"Aozora Pedal" (instrumental)	Suga	Suga	Ishizuka	5:21
5.	"Kiss Kara Hajimeyō" (instrumental)	Youth Case	Velvetronica	Ha-j	4:30
6.	"Natsu no Owari ni Omou Koto" (instrumental)	Ogawa	Ueno	Ueno	4:01
Total length:					27:47

Limited Edition A and B
No.	Title	Lyrics	Music	Arrangement	Length
1.	"Aozora Pedal"	Suga	Suga	Ishizuka	5:21
2.	"Kiss kara Hajimeyō"	Youth Case	Velvetronica	Ha-j	4:30
Total length:					9:49

Limited Edition A – DVD
No.	Title	Length
1.	"Aozora Pedal" (music video)

Limited Edition B – DVD
No.	Title	Length
1.	"Aozora Pedal" (making-of)

== Charts and certifications ==
=== Charts ===
Chart (2006)	Peak position
Japan Oricon Weekly Singles Chart	1
Japan Oricon Yearly Singles Chart	51

=== Sales and certifications ===
Country	Provider	Sales	Certification
Japan	RIAJ	154,832	Platinum

== Release history ==
Region	Date
Japan	August 2, 2006
Taiwan	August 2, 2006
Hong Kong	August 3, 2006
South Korea	August 4, 2006
