= Love So Sweet =

2007 single by Arashi

Single by Arashi

from the album Time
- B-side: "Itsumademo"; "Fight Song"
- Released: February 21, 2007
- Genre: Pop
- Label: J Storm
- Songwriters: Spin; Youth Case; Mugen

Arashi singles chronology
"Aozora Pedal" (2006)	"Love So Sweet" (2007)	"We Can Make It!" (2007)

Music video
- "Love so sweet" on YouTube

"Love So Sweet" is a Japanese song, and the eighteenth single, by the Japanese boy band Arashi. The single was released in two editions: a regular edition containing a bonus secret track and karaoke versions of the songs released in the single, and a limited edition containing a bonus track entitled "Fight Song". With its lyrics written by Arashi and music composed by member Kazunari Ninomiya, it was created in 2006 as an image song for the group's variety show G no Arashi.

On May 11, 2020, Japan time, it was announced via video on their Official SNS that "Love so sweet" would be added to the Reborn project, with the new version of the song to be available from 0:00 on May 15, 2020.

== Single information ==
"Love So Sweet" was used as the theme song for the drama Hana Yori Dango 2 starring the return of the cast from the prequel such as Mao Inoue and Arashi member Jun Matsumoto. The single was listed on Japan Gold Disc Award's list of The Best 10 Singles of 2008. The song's music video was included in their official YouTube channel, when it opened in 2019, and later on, also a live version. The song was also included in their official pages of streaming sites Apple Music, Spotify, and the such.

== Chart performance ==
The single debuted atop the Oricon weekly chart by selling 204,493 copies in its first week. "Love so sweet" had set several records for the group as it charted in the Oricon top ten rankings for five consecutive weeks, longer than any of their previous singles until it was tied by their twenty-second single "One Love", which had later charted for three additional weeks in the top ten, adding up to a total of eight weeks in the weekly top ten. In the Oricon ranking for the first half of 2007, the single sold 420,894 copies and ranked as the third highest-selling single at that point of the year. The single went on to sell a total of 429,832 copies by the end of 2007, making it the fourth best-selling single of the year.

The single is certified Double Platinum by the Recording Industry Association of Japan (RIAJ) for shipment of 500,000 copies.

The song was the first to reach 200 million streams in 2025.

== Track listing ==
Regular edition
No.	Title	Lyrics	Music	Arrangement	Length
1.	"Love So Sweet"	Spin	Youth Case	Mugen	4:50
2.	"Itsumademo" (いつまでも, "Forever")	Spin; Sho Sakurai	Shinya Tada	Ha-j	5:00
3.	"Love So Sweet" (instrumental)	Spin	Youth Case	Mugen	4:50
4.	"Itsumademo" (instrumental, includes hidden talk track)	Spin; Sakurai	Tada	Ha-j	39:55
Total length:					54:35

Limited edition
No.	Title	Lyrics	Music	Arrangement	Length
1.	"Love So Sweet"	Spin	Youth Case	Mugen	4:50
2.	"Itsumademo"	Spin; Sakurai	Tada	Ha-j	5:00
3.	"Fight Song"	Arashi	Kazunari Ninomiya	Gin Kitagawa	3:25
Total length:					13:15

== Charts and certifications ==
=== Charts ===
Chart (2007)	Peak position
Japan Oricon Weekly Singles Chart	1
Japan Oricon Yearly Singles Chart	4

=== Sales and certifications ===
Country	Provider	Sales	Certification
Japan	RIAJ	429,832	Double Platinum

== Release history ==
Region	Date	Format	Label
Japan	February 21, 2007	CD (JACA-5053); LE CD (JACA-5052)	J Storm
South Korea	March 7, 2007	CD (SMJTCD172); LE CD	SM Entertainment
Taiwan	March 7, 2007	CD (JAJSG27003); LE CD (JAJSG27003/A)	Avex Taiwan

== See also ==
- "Flavor of Life" by Hikaru Utada: the ballad version of the song was used as an insert song for Hana Yori Dango 2, thus sometimes considered as the de facto companion to "Love So Sweet".
