= Kitto Daijōbu =

Single by Arashi

from the album Arashic
- B-side: "Harukaze Sneaker"; "Na! Na! Na!"
- Released: May 17, 2006
- Genre: Pop
- Label: J Storm
- Songwriters: Sho Sakurai; Spin; Shinnosuke

Arashi singles chronology
"Wish" (2005)	"Kitto Daijōbu" (2006)	"Aozora Pedal" (2006)

"Kitto Daijōbu" (きっと大丈夫, It'll Definitely Be Alright) is the sixteenth single of the Japanese boy band Arashi. The single was released in two editions: a regular edition containing a bonus track and karaoke versions of all the songs released in the single, and a limited edition containing a DVD with the music video of the A-side.

== Single information ==
"Kitto Daijōbu" was used as an image song in the television advertisement of C1000×. The song was performed many times throughout 2006, most notably during the 2006 Asia Song Festival in Seoul, South Korea when the group was there as a representative of Japan along with Kumi Koda. The song has been cited as a favorite by several artists such as singer Ken Hirai, who spoke of his obsession with the song during one of his on-stage performances "Ken's Bar" and Music Station on May 29, 2009, and Eiji Wentz of the duo WaT, who sang the song on Utaban though he did not know the title of the song.

== Track listing ==
Regular edition
No.	Title	Lyrics	Music	Arrangement	Length
1.	"Kitto Daijōbu" (きっと大丈夫, "It'll Definitely Be Alright")	Sho Sakurai; Spin	Shinnosuke	Shinnosuke	4:52
2.	"Harukaze Sneaker" (春風スニーカー, "Spring Breeze Sneakers")	Gyo Kitagawa	Trevor Ingram	Chokkaku	4:40
3.	"Na! Na! Na!!"	Sakurai; Spin	Takehiko Īda	Ha-j	3:16
4.	"Kitto Daijōbu" (instrumental)				4:52
5.	"Harukaze Sneaker" (instrumental)				4:40
6.	"Na! Na! Na!!" (instrumental)				3:16
Total length:					25:36

Limited edition
No.	Title	Lyrics	Music	Arrangement	Length
1.	"Kitto Daijōbu"	Sakurai; Spin	Shinnosuke	Shinnosuke	4:52
2.	"Harukaze Sneaker"	Kitagawa	Ingram	Chokkaku	4:40
Total length:					9:32

Limited Edition – DVD
No.	Title	Length
1.	"Kitto Daijōbu" (music video)

== Charts and certifications ==
=== Charts ===
Chart (2006)	Peak position
Japan Oricon Weekly Singles Chart	1
Japan Oricon Yearly Singles Chart	45

=== Sales and certifications ===
Country	Provider	Sales	Certification
Japan	RIAJ	160,240	Gold
