= Happiness (Arashi song) =

Single by Arashi

from the album Dream "A" Live
- B-side: "Still..."; "Snowflake" (limited edition)
- Released: September 5, 2007
- Genre: Pop
- Label: J Storm
- Songwriters: Wonderland, Mio Okada

Arashi singles chronology
"We Can Make It!" (2007)	"Happiness" (2007)	"Step and Go" (2008)

Music video
- "Happiness" on YouTube

"Happiness" is the twentieth single by Japanese boy band, Arashi, as well as its title song's name. The single was released on September 5, 2007, in two editions: a regular edition containing the karaoke versions of the songs released in the single, and a limited edition containing a bonus track. The single is the group's ninth consecutive and seventeenth overall number one release, as well as their third consecutive English-titled release.

== Single information ==
"Happiness" was used as the theme song for the drama Yamada Tarō Monogatari starring Arashi members Kazunari Ninomiya and Sho Sakurai.

The song's music video was included in their official YouTube channel, when it opened in 2019, and later on, also a live version. The song was also included in their official pages of streaming sites Apple Music, Spotify, and the such.

The song was Arashi's third to reach 100 million streams.

== Track listing ==
Regular edition
No.	Title	Lyrics	Music	Arrangement	Length
1.	"Happiness"	Wonderland	Mio Okada	Gin Kitagawa	4:19
2.	"Still..."	Sho Sakurai; Shinya Tada	Tada	Naoki-T	4:20
3.	"Happiness" (instrumental)	Wonderland	Okada	Kitagawa	4:19
4.	"Still..." (instrumental)	Sakurai; Tada	Tada	Naoki-T	4:18
Total length:					17:16

Limited edition
No.	Title	Lyrics	Music	Arrangement	Length
1.	"Happiness"	Wonderland	Okada	Kitagawa	4:19
2.	"Still"	Sakurai; Tada	Tada	Naoki-T	4:20
3.	"Snowflake"	Takashi Ogawa	Hydrant	Hydrant	3:37
Total length:					12:12

== Charts and certifications ==
=== Charts ===
Chart (2007)	Peak position
Japan Oricon Weekly Singles Chart	1
Japan Oricon Monthly Singles Chart	1
Japan Oricon Yearly Singles Chart	15

=== Certifications ===
Country	Provider	Sales	Certification
Japan	RIAJ	271,869	Platinum

== Release history ==
Release history and formats for "Happiness"
Region	Date	Format	Label
Japan	September 5, 2007	CD (JACA-5071); LE CD (JACA-5070)	J Storm
South Korea	September 18, 2007	CD (SMJTCD216); LE CD (SMJTCD215)	SM Entertainment
Taiwan	September 19, 2007	CD (JAJSG27006); LE CD (JAJSG27006/A)	Avex Taiwan
Hong Kong	September 27, 2007	CD; LE CD	Avex Asia
