= Wish (Arashi song) =

2005 single by Arashi

Single by Arashi

from the album Arashic
- B-side: "Ichioku No Hoshi"; "Futari no Kinenbi"
- Released: November 16, 2005
- Genre: Pop
- Label: J Storm
- Composer: Hirō Ooyagi
- Lyricist: Yōji Kubota

Arashi singles chronology
"Sakura Sake" (2005)	"Wish" (2005)	"Kitto Daijōbu" (2006)

Music video
- "Wish" on YouTube

"Wish" is the fifteenth single of the Japanese boy band Arashi. The single was released in two editions: a regular edition containing karaoke versions of the songs released in the single, and a limited edition containing a bonus track. The regular edition also contains a hidden track of the group's Secret Talk, in which the members' conversation lasted about forty-two minutes in total before the track was edited down to about thirty-eight minutes.

== Single Information ==
"Wish" was used as the theme song and at the same time opening song for the drama Hana Yori Dango starring Mao Inoue, Arashi member Jun Matsumoto, Shun Oguri, Shota Matsuda and Tsuyoshi Abe. Matsumoto accepted his role of Tsukasa Dōmyōji in Hana Yori Dango so that the group would be able release "Wish" as their next single.

== Track listing ==
Regular edition
No.	Title	Lyrics	Music	Arrangement	Length
1.	"Wish"	Yōji Kubota	Hirō Ooyagi	Chokkaku	4:25
2.	"Ichioku no Hoshi" (イチオクノホシ, "One Hundred Million Stars")	Spin	Kazz	Ha-j	4:31
3.	"Wish" (instrumental)	Kubota	Ooyagi	Chokkaku	4:25
4.	"Ichioku no Hoshi" (instrumental)	Spin	Kazz	Ha-j	43:26
Total length:					56:47

Limited edition
No.	Title	Lyrics	Music	Arrangement	Length
1.	"Wish"	Yōji Kubota	Hirō Ooyagi	Chokkaku	4:25
2.	"Ichioku no Hoshi"	Spin	Kazz	Ha-j	4:31
3.	"Futari no Kinenbi" (二人の記念日, "Our Anniversary")	Shinji Yasuda; Sakurai	Yasuda	Yasuda	4:47

== Charts and certifications ==
=== Charts ===
Chart (2005)	Peak position
Japan Oricon Weekly Singles Chart	1
Japan Oricon Yearly Singles Chart	53

Chart (2006)	Peak position
Japan Oricon Yearly Singles Chart	80

=== Sales and certifications ===
Country	Provider	Sales	Certification
Japan	RIAJ	177,528	Platinum
