= Sakura Sake =

Single by Arashi

from the album One
- B-side: "Te Tsunagō"
- Released: 23 March 2005
- Genre: Pop punk; rock
- Length: 17:48
- Label: J Storm
- Songwriters: Takeshi Aida; Sho Sakurai; Shin Tanimoto; Tomoki Ishizuka

Arashi singles chronology
"Hitomi no Naka no Galaxy/Hero" (2004)	"Sakura Sake" (2005)	"Wish" (2005)

"Sakura Sake" (サクラ咲ケ, Cherry Blossoms, Bloom) is a single by Japanese boy band Arashi. It was released on 22 March 2005 through J Storm as the first single from their fifth studio album One (2005). The song was written by Takeshi Aida, Sho Sakurai, and Shin Tanimoto. "Sakura Sake" was released in two editions: Regular Edition and Limited Edition. The single peaked at number one on the Oricon Singles Chart, selling 115,000 copies in its first week. The single was certified Gold by the Recording Industry Association of Japan in March 2005 for shipments of 100,000 units.

== Composition ==
"Sakura Sake" was written by Takeshi Aida, Sho Sakurai, and Shin Tanimoto, and arranged by Tomoki Ishizuka. Aida and Tanimoto previously co-wrote Arashi's ninth single "Pikanchi" (2002). "Sakura Sake" is a positive rock and pop punk song with supportive lyrics. The lyrics contain imagery of cherry blossoms and Spring. The coupling song "Te Tsunagō" is a ballad and was written by Eiichirō Taruki and Akira.

== Release and promotion ==
"Sakura Sake" was released on 22 March 2005 in two editions: Regular Edition which included the karaoke versions of all tracks; and the limited edition which contained a DVD with the music video of the single. "Sakura Sake" was used as an image song for the university admission cram school Johnan Academic Preparatory Institute (ja), which featured Arashi member Sho Sakurai as the spokesperson and promoter. Arashi performed the song for the first time on television on Ongaku Senshi Music Fighter (ja) on 25 March 2005. The following day, they performed on Count Down TV On 1 April 2005, Arashi performed the song on Music Station's 3-Hour Spring Special.

== Reception ==
"Sakura Sake" received generally positive reviews from music critics. AllMusic's Alexey Eremenko, who wrote Arashi's biography on the website, selected the track as some of their best work. A mixed review came from a writer at CD Journal, who enjoyed the chorus in "Sakura Sake" but disliked "Te Tsunagō", which they thought was "nothing but a foolish love song". A writer at JMD, however, found the song "heartwarming". "Sakura Sake" has been voted into Oricon's Top 10 Sakura Songs Ranking every year since 2006. On 3 May 2013, "Sakura Sake" topped Music Station's Best 25 Spring Support Songs poll.

Commercially, the single was a success. It debuted at number-one on the Oricon Singles Chart, selling 115,000 copies in its first week of release. The release spent 15 weeks on the Top 200. It was the group's third consecutive, and tenth overall number-one single in Japan. By the end of 2005, it had sold over 172,000 units in Japan, making it the 55th highest-selling single of that year. In March 2005, the single was certified Gold by the Recording Industry Association of Japan for shipments of 100,000 units. In 2012, the song entered the Billboard Japan Hot 100 chart, peaking at number 54 on the date ending 23 January 2012.

On May 12, 2026, Billboard reported that the song had reached 100 million streams.

== Track listing ==
Regular edition
No.	Title	Lyrics	Music	Arrangement	Length
1.	"Sakura Sake" (サクラ咲ケ, "Cherry Blossoms, Bloom")	Takeshi Aida; Sho Sakurai	Shin Tanimoto	Tomoki Ishizuka	4:21
2.	"Te Tsunagō" (手つなごぉ, "Let's Hold Hands")	Eiichirō Taruki	Akira	Akira	4:33
3.	"Sakura Sake" (instrumental)	Aida; Sakurai	Tanimoto	Ishizuka	4:21
4.	"Te Tsunagō" (instrumental)	Taruki	Akira	Akira	4:33
Total length:					17:48

Limited edition
No.	Title	Lyrics	Music	Arrangement	Length
1.	"Sakura Sake"	Aida; Sakurai	Tanimoto	Ishizuka	4:21
2.	"Te Tsunagō"	Taruki	Akira	Akira	4:33
Total length:					8:54

Limited edition – DVD
No.	Title	Length
1.	"Sakura Sake" (music video)

== Charts and certifications ==
=== Weekly charts ===
Chart (2005–2012)	Peak position
Japan (Oricon Singles Chart)	1
Japan (Billboard Japan Hot 100)	54

=== Year-end charts ===
Chart (2005)	Peak position
Japan (Oricon Singles Chart)	55

=== Certifications ===
Region	Certification	Certified units/sales
Japan (RIAJ)	Gold	173,623
