= Tokio discography =

Discography of Japanese band

- Studio albums: 12
- Extended plays: 1
- Compilation albums: 3
- Singles: 53
- Cover albums: 1
- Remix albums: 1

The discography of Tokio, a Japanese rock/pop band, consists of twelve studio albums, one cover album, one remix album, three compilation albums, one mini album, and more than fifty singles released under Sony Music Entertainment, Universal Music, and J Storm.

== Albums ==
=== Studio albums ===
Title	Details	Peak	Sales	Certifications
Title	Details	JPN (Note: Sources for chart positions are as follows: Harvest, Sugar, 17, Heart,)	Sales	Certifications
Tokio	Released: November 21, 1994; Label: Sony Records; Format: CD	8		
Bad Boys Bound	Released: July 3, 1995; Label: Sony Records; Format: CD	4		
Blowing	Released: March 25, 1996; Label: Sony Records; Format: CD	7		
Wild & Mild	Released: March 26, 1997; Label: Sony Records; Format: CD	9		
Graffiti	Released: April 1, 1998; Label: Sony Records; Format: CD	9		
Yesterday & Today	Released: February 2, 2000; Label: Sony Records; Format: CD	9		
5 Ahead	Released: December 5, 2001; Label: Universal J; Format: CD	8		
Glider	Released: February 19, 2003; Label: Universal J; Format: CD	5	100,000	RIAJ: Gold
Act II	Released: February 2, 2005; Label: Universal Music; Format: CD	3		
Harvest	Released: October 18, 2006; Label: Universal Music; Format: CD	2	100,000	RIAJ: Gold
Sugar	Released: February 20, 2008; Label: Universal Music; Format: CD, CD+DVD	6	100,000	RIAJ: Gold
17	Released: August 22, 2012; Label: J Storm; Format: CD, CD+DVD	5		

=== Remix albums ===
Title	Details	Peak
Title	Details	JPN
Tokio Remix	Released: March 8, 1995; Label: Sony Records; Format: CD	9

=== Cover albums ===
Title	Details	Peak	Sales	Certifications
Title	Details	JPN	Sales	Certifications
TOK10	Released: September 1, 2004; Label: Universal J; Format: CD	1	100,000	RIAJ: Gold

=== Compilation albums ===
Title	Details	Peak	Sales	Certifications
Title	Details	JPN	Sales	Certifications
Best E.P Selection of Tokio	Released: August 26, 1996; Label: Sony Records; Format: CD	4		
Best EP Selection of Tokio II	Released: May 9, 2001; Label: Sony Records; Format: CD	6	100,000	RIAJ: Gold
Heart	Released: July 16, 2014; Label: J Storm; Format: CD, CD+DVD	1		RIAJ: Gold

== Extended plays ==
Title	Details	Peak
Title	Details	JPN
Denko Sekka	Released: August 5, 1998; Label: Sony Records; Format: CD	20

== Singles ==
Title	Year	Peaks		Sales	Certifications	Album
Title	Year	JPN (Note: Sources for chart positions are as follows: "Ashita o Mezashite!", "Mr. Traveling Man", "Get Your Dream", "Sorafune / Do! Do! Do!", "Hikari no Machi/Run Free (Swan Dance o Kimi to)", "Honjitsu, Mijukumono/Over Drive", "Seisyun", "Amagasa/Akireru Kurai Bokura wa Negaō", "Taiyō to Sabaku no Bara/Subeki Koto", "Advance/Mata Asa ga Kuru", "Haruka", "NaNaNa (Taiyo Nante Irane)", "Miageta Ryūsei", "Haneda Kūkō no Kiseki/Kibou", "Lyric", "Tegami", "Hontontoko/Future", "Love, Holiday.", "Tokyo Drive", "Fragile", "Ai! Wanna Be With You...", "Kumo".)	JPN Hot. (Note: Sources for chart positions are as follows: "Amagasa/Akireru Kurai Bokura wa Negaō", "Taiyō to Sabaku no Bara/Subeki Koto", "Advance/Mata Asa ga Kuru", "Haruka", "NaNaNa (Taiyo Nante Irane)", "Miageta Ryūsei", "Haneda Kūkō no Kiseki/Kibou", "Lyric", "Tegami", "Hontontoko/Future", "Love, Holiday.", "Tokyo Drive", "Fragile" "Ai! Wanna Be With You...", "Kumo",)	Sales	Certifications	Album
"Love You Only"	1994	3	*	400,000	RIAJ: Platinum	Tokio
"Ashita no Kimi o Mamoritai (Yamato2520)"	1994	7	*			Tokio
"Uwasa no Kiss"	1995	2	*	200,000	RIAJ: Gold	Bad Boys Bound
"Heart o Migakukkyanai"	1995	3	*	200,000	RIAJ: Gold	Bad Boys Bound
"Soko Nashi Love"	1995	5	*			Blowing
"Sukisa (Ticket to Love)"	1995	5	*			Blowing
"Kaze ni Natte"	1995	5	*	200,000	RIAJ: Gold	Blowing
"Magic Channel"	1996	6	*			Best E.P Selection of Tokio
"Arigatō... Yūki"	1996	3	*	200,000	RIAJ: Gold	Best E.P Selection of Tokio
"Everybody Can Do!"	1996	9	*			Non-album single
"Furarete Genki"	1997	5	*	200,000	RIAJ: Gold	Wild & Mild
"Julia"	1997	10	*	200,000	RIAJ: Gold	Graffiti
"Kono Yubi Tomare!"	1998	9	*			Non-album single
"Love & Peace"	1998	9	*			Yesterday & Today
"Kimi o Omōtoki/Oh! Heaven"	1999	9	*	200,000	RIAJ: Gold	Yesterday & Today
"Nandomo Yume no Naka de Kurikaesu Love Song"	1999	7	*			Yesterday & Today
"Wasureenu Kimi e"	1999	10	*			Yesterday & Today
"Ai no Arashi"	1999	10	*			Best EP Selection of Tokio II
"Minna de Wahhahha"	2000	6	*			Best EP Selection of Tokio II
"Koi ni Kizuita Yoru"	2000	11	*			Best EP Selection of Tokio II
"Doitsu mo Koitsu mo"	2001	10	*			5 Ahead
"Message/Hitoribotchi no Haburashi"	2001	1	*	400,000	RIAJ: Platinum	5 Ahead
"Kanpai!!"	2001	4	*	200,000	RIAJ: Gold	5 Ahead
"DR"	2001	4	*	200,000	RIAJ: Gold	5 Ahead
"Hana Uta"	2002	5	*	200,000	RIAJ: Gold	Glider
"Green"	2002	6	*			Glider
"Ding Dong/Glider"	2002	1	*	200,000	RIAJ: Gold	Glider
"Ambitious Japan!"	2003	1	*	100,000	RIAJ: Gold	Act II
"Love Love Manhattan/Alive-Life"	2003	4	*	100,000	RIAJ: Gold	Act II
"Transistor G (Glamour) Girl"	2004	4	*	100,000	RIAJ: Gold	Act II
"Jibun no Tameni/For You"	2004	4	*			Act II
"Ashita o Mezashite!"	2005	3	*			Harvest
"Mr. Traveling Man"	2006	1	*	100,000	RIAJ: Gold	Harvest
"Get Your Dream"	2006	2	*	100,000	RIAJ: Gold	Harvest
"Sorafune / Do! Do! Do!"	2006	1	*	500,000; 1,000,000	RIAJ: 2× Platinum; RIAJ (ringtone): Million	Harvest
"Hikari no Machi/Run Free (Swan Dance o Kimi to)"	2007	2	*	100,000	RIAJ: Gold	Sugar
"Honjitsu, Mijukumono/Over Drive"	2007	2	*	100,000	RIAJ: Gold	Sugar
"Seisyun"	2007	1	*	100,000	RIAJ: Gold	Sugar
"Amagasa/Akireru Kurai Bokura wa Negaō"	2008	2	3	67,000		17
"Taiyō to Sabaku no Bara/Subeki Koto"	2009	3	4			17
"Advance/Mata Asa ga Kuru"	2010	5	5			17
"Haruka"	2010	1	2	49,000		17
"NaNaNa (Taiyo Nante Irane)"	2010	6	6			17
"Miageta Ryūsei"	2011	4	7			17
"Haneda Kūkō no Kiseki/Kibou"	2012	5	20			17
"Lyric"	2013	7	15			Heart
"Tegami"	2013	8	15			Non-album singles
"Hontontoko/Future"	2013	6	12			Non-album singles
"Love, Holiday."	2014	4	16			Non-album singles
"Tokyo Drive"	2015	9	16			Non-album singles
"Fragile"	2016	7	11			Non-album singles
"Ai! Wanna Be With You..."	2016	4	13			Non-album singles
"Kumo"	2017	8	19			Non-album singles

== Indie singles ==
Year	Title	Release date
1999	"15minutes"	May 23
1999	"Pink" (ピンク, Pinku)	June 13

== Theme songs and tie-ins ==
- "7 O'Clock" - Kodocha theme song
- "Ai no Arashi" – Psychometrer Eiji 2 theme song
- "Amagasa/Akirerukurai Bokura wa Negaou" – Yasuko to Kenji Theme Song/Mentore G theme song
- "Ambitious Japan!" – theme song for JR Central's nozomi train services
- "Boku no Renai Jijyou to Daidokoro Jijyou" – Mentore G Theme theme song
- "Cry for the Moon" - 0 Gōshitsu no Kyaku theme song from February to March 2010
- "Get Your Dream" – theme song in Japan for the 2006 FIFA World Cup
- "Dash Village" - DASH Village theme song (from The! Tetsuwan! Dash!!)
- "Ding Dong" – Yan Papa theme song
- "DR" – Handoku theme song
- "Everybody Can Do!" – Kochira Katsushika-ku Kameari Kōen-mae Hashutsujo second opening theme
- "Furarete Genki" – Psychometrer Eiji theme song
- "Haruka" - Dash Beach theme song (from The! Tetsuwan! Dash!!)
- "Heart o Migakukkyanai" – Tobe! Isami opening theme
- "Hikari no Machi/Run Free (Swan Dance o Kimi To)" – Skull Man theme song
- "Hitoribocchi no Haburashi" – Mukodono theme song
- "Hontontoko" - Kurokochi theme song
- "Jibun no Tameni" – Nurseman Ga Yuku theme song
- "Julia" – Seiji no Mikata theme song
- "Love & Peace" – Love and Peace theme song
- "Love Love Manhattan" – Manhattan Love Story theme song
- "Lyric" - Nakuna Hara-chan theme song
- "Mata Asa ga Kuru" - Romes theme song
- "Message" – Tengoku Ni Ichiban Chikai Otoko theme song
- "Mr. Traveling Man" – YAOH theme song
- "NaNaNa (Taiyo Nante Irane)" - Unubore Deka theme song
- "Seishun (Seisyun)" – Utahime theme song
- "Sorafune" – My Boss My Hero theme song
- "Subeki Koto" – 5LDK ending theme song
- "Taiyō to Sabaku no Bara" – Kareinaru Spy theme song
- "Transistor G (Glamour) Girl" – Kanojo ga Shinjatta theme song

== Videography ==
=== Blu-Ray ===
- TOKIO 20th Anniversary Live Tour HEART (Released: 28 January 2015)

=== DVD ===
- Tokio 1999 Live In Nihon Budokan (Tokio 1999 Live In 日本武道館) (Released: 29 March 2000)
- Tokio Video Clips 2000 (Released: 29 March 2000)
- 5 Round (Released: 22 May 2002)
- Tokio Live Tour 2002 5 Ahead In Nihon Budokan (Tokio Live Tour 2002 5 Ahead In 日本武道館) (Released: 7 August 2002)
- 5 Round II (Released: 19 May 2004)
- Tokio 10th Anniversary Live 2004 (Released: 12 January 2005)
- Boku no Renai Jijo to Daidokoro Jijo (僕の恋愛事情と台所事情) (Released: 16 November 2005)
- Tokio Special GIGs 2006: Get Your Dream (Released: 22 November 2006)
- 5 Round III (Released: 31 January 2007)
- OVER/PLUS (Released: 14 September 2011)
- 17.18 Live Tour(Released: 17 April 2013)
- TOKIO 20th Anniversary Live Tour HEART (Released: 28 January 2015)

=== VHS ===
- Tokio First Live Video: Bad Boys Bound 95 (Released: 23 November 1995)
- Tokio Live 1997 + Special Bonus Track 1998 (Released: 1 April 1998)
- Tokio 1999 Live In Nihon Budokan (Tokio 1999 Live In 日本武道館) (Released: 6 October 1999)
- Tokio Video Clips 2000 (Released: 29 March 2000)
- 5 Round (Released: 22 May 2002)
- Tokio Live Tour 2002 5 Ahead In Nihon Budokan (Tokio Live Tour 2002 5 Ahead In 日本武道館) (Released: 7 August 2002)
- 5 Round II (Released: 19 May 2004)
- Tokio 10th Anniversary Live 2004 (Released: 17 January 2005)
