= Heart (Tokio album) =

Greatest hits album by Tokio
- Released: July 16, 2014
- Recorded: 1994–2014
- Language: Japanese
- Label: J Storm

Tokio chronology
17 (2012)	Heart (2014)

Singles from Heart
- 1. "Lyric" Released: February 20, 2013

Heart is the third greatest hits album by Japanese band Tokio. It was released on July 16, 2014, through J Storm. The album debuted atop the Oricon Albums Chart, selling 41,000 copies. It became Tokio's second number-one album in Japan, and first number-one album since TOK10 (2004). The album was preceded by the lead single "Lyric", which reached number seven on the Oricon Singles Chart. In September 2014, the band embarked on an anniversary tour called Tokio 20th Anniversary Live Tour Heart.

== Track listing ==
Disc 1
No.	Title	Lyrics	Music	Arrangement	Length
1.	"Lyric"	Tomoya Nagase	Nagase	Nagase	4:58
2.	"Love You Only"	Tetsuo Kudō	Takashi Tsushimi	Tatsuya Nishiwaki	3:57
3.	"Kimi o Omou Toki"	Natsumi Watanabe	Miki Watanabe	Soul Toul; Ryūta Yoshimura	5:20
4.	"Hana Uta"	Takeshi	Akinori Suzuki	Masanori Shimada	4:38
5.	"Green"	Hikari	Hikari	Shimada	5:35
6.	"Ambitious Japan!"	Rei Nakanishi	Kyōhei Tsutsumi	Motoki Funayama	4:01
7.	"Julia"	Joe Rinoie	Rinoie	Rinoie; Masaki Suzukawa	4:52
8.	"Glider"	Hikari	Hikari	Hikari	5:10
9.	"Mr. Traveling Man"	Akio Shimizu	Shimizu	Masahide Sakuma	4:08
10.	"Jibun no Tame ni"	Takashi Iioka	Iioka	Kazuhiro Yamahara	4:04
11.	"Sorafune"	Miyuki Nakajima	Nakajima	Funayama	4:00
12.	"Subeki Koto"	Shigeru Joshima	Taichi Kokubun	Kōsuke Noma	4:26
13.	"Amagasa"	Ringo Sheena	Sheena	Tokyo Jihen	3:54
14.	"Miageta Ryūsei"	Yoshitaka Taira	Taira	Hikari; Kam	5:03
15.	"DR"	Kōtarō Kubota	Kubota	Kubota; Kam	4:09
16.	"Heart"	Nagase	Nagase	Nagase	4:47
Total length:					72:02

Disc 2
No.	Title	Lyrics	Music	Arrangement	Length
1.	"Yesterday's"	Shimizu	Shimizu	Project T	4:16
2.	"Boku no Ren'ai Jijō to Daidokoro Jijō"	Sakuma	Sakuma	Taku Yoshioka; Yōichi Murata	5:17
3.	"Robō no Hana"	Hikari	Hikari	Hikari; Kam	5:35
4.	"Symphonic"	Hikari	Hikari	Kam	5:38
5.	"The Course of Life"	Kokubun	Kokubun	Hikari	4:34
6.	"Plus"	Joshima	Joshima	Tokio; Yamahara	4:10
7.	"Sometimes"	Nagase	Nagase	Nagase	5:00
8.	"Low Speed"	Masahiro Matsuoka	Shigehiro Matsushima	Nagase; Yamahara	4:53
9.	"Dream & Breeze"	Takeshi	Yūsuke Katō	Hikari	4:32
10.	"Southend"	Hikari	Hikari	Hikari	4:28
11.	"Sugar"	Nagase	Nagase	Tokio	6:08
12.	"Zettai!"	Kanata Asamizu	Nishiwaki	Nishiwaki	4:15
13.	"Jumbo"	Kaio Tsuruta	Tsuruta	Project T	3:45
14.	"Sonic Drive!"	Nagase	Nagase	Nagase	4:10
15.	"T2"	Kokubun	Kokubun	Kokubun; Kam	3:27
16.	"Kokoro"	Joshima	Joshima	Joshima; Kam	4:25
Total length:					74:33
