= J-Friends =

J-FRIENDS
- Origin: Japan
- Genres: J-pop
- Years active: 1997–2003
- Labels: Sony Music; J-Friends Project/Avex Trax; Johnny's Entertainment; Universal J
- Past members: TOKIO; Shigeru Joshima; Tomoya Nagase; Masahiro Matsuoka; Taichi Kokubun; Tatsuya Yamaguchi V6; Masayuki Sakamoto; Hiroshi Nagano; Yoshihiko Inohara; Go Morita; Ken Miyake; Junichi Okada KinKi Kids; Koichi Domoto; Tsuyoshi Domoto

J-FRIENDS was a special unit made up of Johnny & Associates groups TOKIO, V6, and KinKi Kids. It was formed in 1997 to raise money for schools affected by the Great Hanshin earthquake in 1995. Until their disbandment in 2003 they were able to release 6 singles and held some charity concerts and events. In the end they were able to donate 836,951,855 yen.

== History ==
In 1995, there was a big earthquake in Hanshin and Awaji in Japan. About 6,500 people were dead and 513,000 houses were crushed. To help such people, in 1998, KinKi Kids, along with fellow Johnny's groups V6 and TOKIO, came together to form a special charity-oriented group called J-FRIENDS, they sang songs to raise the money for Hanshin and Awaji earthquake victims especially for children, in which all the songs are created and being produced by many famous international musicians such as Michael Jackson, Maurice White, Diane Warren, Elton John, Jon Bon Jovi, and Koshi Inaba. J-Friends's first single "Ashita ga Kikoeru/Children's Holiday" (明日が聴こえる/Children's Holiday, "Can You Hear Tomorrow/Children's Holiday"), released on January 21, 1998, went on to sell over a million copies and ranked 12th on the annual Oricon charts by the end of the year.

== Discography ==
=== EPs ===
Title	Album details	Peak	Certifications
Title	Album details	JPN	Certifications
People of the World	Released: January 13, 1999; Label: Sony Music Records; Formats: CD	1	RIAJ: 2× Platinum

=== Singles ===
Title	Year	Peak	Certifications
Title	Year	JPN	Certifications
"Ashita ga Kikoeru"	1998	1	RIAJ: Million
"Children's Holiday"	1998	1	RIAJ: Million
"Next 100 Years"	1999	1	RIAJ: 2× Platinum
"I Will Get There"	2000	1	
"Always (A Song for Love)"	2001	1	RIAJ: Platinum
"Love Me All Over"	2002	1	

=== Videos ===
Title	Release details	Peak	Certifications
Title	Release details	JPN	Certifications
Never Ending Spirit 1997–2003	Released: April 9, 2003; Label: Johnny's Entertainment; Formats: VHS, DVD	1	RIAJ: Gold
