= Amagasa =

- Standard edition cover.

Single by Tokio

from the album 17
- A-side: "Akireru Kurai Bokura wa Negaō"
- B-side: "Kachū no Otoko", "Jōshō Shikō"
- Released: September 3, 2008
- Recorded: 2008
- Genre: Pop-rock; pop
- Length: 3:51
- Label: J Storm
- Songwriters: Ringo Sheena; Kazuaki Yamashita

Tokio singles chronology
"Seisyun" (2007)	"Amagasa" (2008)	"Taiyō to Sabaku no Bara" (2009)

Alternative cover
- Limited B edition cover, featuring the members of Tokio.

"Amagasa" (雨傘; "Rain Umbrella") is a song by Japanese band Tokio. It was one of the two A-sides that composed the band's 39th single, along with the song "Akireru Kurai Bokura wa Negaō". The single was released on September 3, 2008, and was their first release with J Storm. "Amagasa" was written by Japanese rock musician Ringo Sheena. In 2014, Sheena covered the two songs she wrote for the single, "Amagasa" and "Kachū no Otoko", for her album Gyakuyunyū: Kōwankyoku.

== Background and development ==
Tokio's 2006 single "Sorafune" was a hit, being certified by the RIAJ for 1,000,000 ringtone downloads. The song was written by Japanese singer-songwriter Miyuki Nakajima, and acted as the theme song for the drama My Boss My Hero, starring Tomoya Nagase. Since then, Tokio has had several singles written by musicians famous in their own right, such as "Hikari no Machi" by Yoshihiro Kai, another song by Miyuki Nakajima called "Honjitsu, Mijukumono" and "Seisyun", which was written by Tsuyoshi Nagabuchi.

Ringo Sheena had previously worked with musicians Ryōko Hirosue and Rie Tomosaka between 1998 and 2000, writing and producing music for them. This single was the first time in eight years that she had written music for another musical act. "Amagasa" / "Akireru Kurai Bokura wa Negaō" was Tokio's first single released under J Storm. From their debut in 1994 until 2001, Tokio had worked with Sony Music Entertainment Japan, before moving to Universal Music Japan with the single "Doitsu mo Koitsu mo" / "Boku no Mirai" (2001).

== Writing and production ==
The two songs on the single written by Ringo Sheena, "Amagasa" and "Kachū no Otoko", featured her band at the time Tokyo Jihen performing the song arrangement. Sheena felt that because both Tokio and Tokyo Jihen are structured in the same way (i.e. both are rock bands with instrument players), it was easy to give the songs added flair. "Amagasa" took eight hours to record, as Tomoya Nagase felt very nervous recording for Sheena. He used polite honorifics when talking to her, as he accidentally thought that she was older than him. The chorus is sung in a high key that Nagase found difficult to sing, however even though he was struggling, Sheena felt that it sounded fine, as she wanted the changing key effect.

Of the other songs on the single, "Akireru Kurai Bokura wa Negaō" by producer her0ism, and the song "Jōshō Shikō" was sung by Taichi Kokubun on lead vocals.

== Promotion and release ==
"Amagasa" was used as the theme song for the NTV drama Yasuko to Kenji, which starred Tokio member Masahiro Matsuoka as the titular Kenji. This was the ninth single released by the band that was a drama theme song for a drama starring a member of Tokio, after "Furarete Genki" (1997) for Psychometrer Eiji, "Love & Peace" (1998) for Love & Peace, "Ai no Arashi" (1999) for Psychometrer Eiji 2, "Hanauta" (2002) for Nurse Man, "Transistor G (Glamour) Girl" (2004) for Kanojo ga Shinjatta, "Jibun no Tame ni" (2004) for Nurse Man ga Yuku, "Sorafune" (2006) for My Boss My Hero, and "Honjitsu, Mijukumono" for Juken no Kamisama. "Amagasa" was performed live at Music Station three times. First on September 5, then the following week on September 12, and also at the New Years special on December 26, 2008. The song was also performed at the Fuji TV FNS Kayōsai on December 3, 2008.

Additionally, "Akireru Kurai Bokura wa Negaō" was used as an ending theme song for Tokio's Fuji Television variety show Mentore G. It was used from May 11, 2008 until the program's final airing on September 14, 2008.

== Track listings ==
Standard edition
No.	Title	Writer(s)	Arrangement	Length
1.	"Amagasa"	Ringo Sheena	Tokyo Jihen	3:51
2.	"Kachū no Otoko" (渦中の男, "Vortex Boy")	R. Sheena	Tokyo Jihen	2:21
3.	"Jōshō Shikō" (上昇思考, "Rising Thoughts")	Kazuaki Yamashita	Shogo Ohnishi	4:06
4.	"Akireru Kurai Bokura wa Negaō" (あきれるくらい 僕らは願おう, "Let's Wish So Much that We Are Amazed")	her0ism	Kazuhiro Yamahara	4:26
5.	"Amagasa (Backing Track)"	R. Sheena	Tokyo Jihen	3:53
6.	"Akireru Kurai Bokura wa Negaō (Backing Track)"	her0ism	K. Yamahara	4:23
Total length:				23:00

Limited editions A and B
No.	Title	Length
1.	"Amagasa"	3:51
2.	"Akireru Kurai Bokura wa Negaō"	4:26
Total length:		8:17

Limited edition A DVD
No.	Title	Director	Length
1.	"Amagasa (music video)"	Hiroaki Matsunaga
2.	"Amagasa (Making)"	H. Matsunaga

Limited edition B DVD
No.	Title	Length
1.	"Akireru Kurai Bokura wa Negaō (music video, version 1)"
2.	"Tokio Station II: Akireru Kurai Tokio wa Shaberō-hen"

== Charts and sales ==
Chart (2008)	Peak position
Japan Billboard Adult Contemporary Airplay	6
Japan Billboard Japan Hot 100	3
Japan Oricon weekly singles: "Amagasa" / "Akireru Kurai Bokura wa Negaō"	2
Japan Oricon monthly singles: "Amagasa" / "Akireru Kurai Bokura wa Negaō"	14

=== Sales ===
Chart	Amount
Oricon physical sales: "Amagasa" / "Akireru Kurai Bokura wa Negaō"	67,000

== Release history ==
Region	Date	Format	Distributing Label	Catalogue codes
Japan	August 20, 2008	Ringtone	J Storm	—N/a
Japan	September 3, 2008	CD, CD/DVD type A, CD/DVD type B, rental CD	J Storm	JACA-5114, JACA-5116, JACA-5118
Taiwan	September 19, 2008	CD	Avex Taiwan	JAJSG27015
