= 17 (Tokio album) =

Studio album by Tokio
- Released: August 22, 2012
- Genre: Japanese Rock/Pop
- Length: 72:49 (CD); 76:34 (DualDisc)
- Label: J Storm (distribution by Sony Music Japan)
- Producer: Tokio (executive), Johnny Kitagawa

Tokio chronology
Sugar (2008)	17 (2012)	Heart (2014)

17 is the twelfth and final studio album by Japanese band Tokio. It was released on August 22, 2012. The album peaked at fifth place on the Oricon weekly charts, and remained in the charts for five weeks.

It was the band's final studio album feature bassist Tatsuya Yamaguchi.

== Track listing ==
No.	Title	Lyrics	Music	Arrangement	Length
1.	"Kibou"	Maki Ogawa	Kosuke Morimoto	Shogo Ohnishi
2.	"Amagasa" (雨傘)	Ringo Sheena	Sheena	Tokyo Jihen
3.	"More"	Shigeru Joshima	Joshima	Kazuhiro Yamahara
4.	"-Haruka-" (-遥か-)	Nobuteru Maeda	Michiya Haruhata	Yamahara
5.	"Taiyō to Sabaku no Bara" (太陽と砂漠のバラ)	Shimizu Akio	Akio	Akio
6.	"Subeki Koto" (スベキコト)	Joshima	Taichi Kokubun	Kosuke Noma
7.	"Akireru Kurai Bokura wa Negaō" (あきれるくらい 僕らは願おう)	Her0ism	Her0ism	Yamahara
8.	"Mata Asa ga Kuru" (また朝が来る)	Yamahara, Yuya Abe	Yamahara	Yamahara
9.	"...As One"	Tatsuya Yamaguchi	Kokubun	KAM
10.	"Archive"	Tomoya Nagase	Nagase	Nagase
11.	"The Course of Life"	Kokubun	Kokubun	Hikari
12.	"Advance"	Makoto Ogata	Ogata	Ohnishi
13.	"Miageta Ryūsei" (見上げた流星)	Yoshitaka Taira	Taira	Hikari, Kam
14.	"Low Speed" (ロースピード)	Masahiro Matsuoka	Shigehiro Matsushima	Nagase, Yamahara
15.	"NaNaNa (Taiyo Nante Irane)" (NaNaNa (太陽なんていらねぇ))	Kōji Tamaki	Tamaki	Anzen Chitai
16.	"Haneda Kūkō no Kiseki" (羽田空港の奇跡)	Ken Yokoyama	Yokoyama	Yokoyama, KAM
17.	"Jiyūna Na no Shita ni" (自由な名の下に)	Joshima	Kokubun	Yamahara

Limited edition
No.	Title	Lyrics	Music	Arrangement	Length
6.	"Autumn"	Matsuoka	Matsuoka	KAM
10.	"Hope"	Kan Sawada, Morimoto	Sawada, Morimoto	Sawada
14.	"Sometimes"	Nagase	Nagase	Nagase
