= Bad Boys Bound =

Studio album by Tokio
- Released: July 3, 1995
- Genre: Japanese Rock/Pop
- Length: 46:36
- Label: Sony Music Entertainment

Tokio chronology
Tokio Remix (1995)	Bad Boys Bound (1995)	Blowing (1996)

Bad Boys Bound is the second studio album by Japanese band Tokio. It was released on July 3, 1995. The album reached fourth place on the Oricon weekly chart and charted for four weeks.

== Track listing ==
No.	Title	Lyrics	Music	Arrangement	Length
1.	"Mirai ha Sense" (未来派センス)	Kanata Asamizu	Tatsuya Nishiwaki	Tatsuya Nishiwaki	3:41
2.	"Juliet"	Rui Serizawa	Hideki Aoki	Tohru Shigemi	4:43
3.	"Dakishimetakatte" (抱きしめたかった)	Hiroshi Yamada	Tatsuya Nishiwaki	Tatsuya Nishiwaki	4:30
4.	"Uwasa no Kiss" (うわさのキイッス)	Tetsuo Kudou	Takashi Tsushimi	Ryoumei Shirai	3:32
5.	"Girl"	Hiroshi Yamada	Kensuke Yoshida	Tatsuya Nishiwaki	4:40
6.	"Aitsu ni Yoroshiku" (彼女 (アイツ） によろしく)	Tetsuo Kudou	Takashi Tsushimi	Ryoumei Shirai	4:33
7.	"Konoyoru wo Koete" (この夜を越えて)	Hiroshi Yamada	Tetsuji Hayashi	Tatsuya Nishiwaki	4:33
8.	"Kanashimi no Believer" (哀しみの Believer)	Tetsuo Kudou	Takashi Tsushimi	Ryoumei Shirai	3:52
9.	"Boku no Ojisan - My Uncle Is a Nice Guy" (ぼくの伯父さん～My uncle is a nice guy～)	Tetsuo Kudou	Takashi Tsushimi	Ryoumei Shirai	3:42
10.	"Watasenai Angel" (渡せないエンジェル)	Hiroshi Yamada	Hideki Aoki	Tatsuya Nishiwaki	3:56
11.	"Yatto Aeta" (やっと会えた)	Kanata Asamizu	Hideki Aoki	Tohru Shigemi	4:53

== Personnel ==
- Shigeru Joshima - guitar
- Tomoya Nagase - lead vocalist, guitar
- Masahiro Matsuoka - drums
- Taichi Kokubun - keyboard
- Tatsuya Yamaguchi - bass
