= Seisyun =

"Seisyun 青春"

Single by Tokio

from the album Sugar
- Released: November 28, 2007
- Recorded: 2009
- Genre: J-pop, Rock
- Length: 18:12
- Label: J-Storm
- Songwriter(s): Tsuyoshi Nagabuchi, T. Nagabuchi

Tokio singles chronology
"Honjitsu, Mijukumono / Over Drive" (2007)	"Seisyun 青春" (2007)	"Amagasa/Akireru Kurai Bokura wa Negaō" (2008)

"Seisyun" is the thirty-ninth single by the Japanese band Tokio, released on November 28, 2007. It topped the Oricon weekly charts and charted for twelve weeks. The song "Seisyun" was used as the theme song to Utahime, a drama show Tomoya Nagase starred in.

== Track listing ==
"Seisyun" was released in three different versions:

=== CD Normal Edition ===
No.	Title	Lyrics	Music	Arrangement	Length
1.	"Seisyun"	Tsuyoshi Nagabuchi	T. Nagabuchi	Motoki Funayama	5:01
2.	"Kimajime"	Kodamakkusu	Kodamakkusu	KAM
3.	"Stardust Lover Orchestra"	Takeshi	Takeshi	Takeshi and Yasutaka Kume
4.	"Seisyun (Backing Track)"

=== Limited Edition A ===
CD
No.	Title	Lyrics	Music	Arrangement	Length
1.	"Seisyun"	T. Nagabuchi	T. Nagabuchi	M. Funayama	5:01
2.	"Kimajime"	Kodamakkusu	Kodamakkusu	KAM

DVD
No.	Title	Length
1.	"Seisyun (Video Clip: Complete Version)"

=== Limited Edition B ===
CD
No.	Title	Lyrics	Music	Arrangement	Length
1.	"Seisyun"	T. Nagabuchi	T. Nagabuchi	M. Funayama	5:01
2.	"Kimajime"	Kodamakkusu	Kodamakkusu	KAM

DVD
No.	Title	Length
1.	"Seisyun (Making of Video Clip)"
