= Best E.P Selection of Tokio =

Greatest hits album by Tokio
- Released: August 26, 1996
- Genre: Japanese Rock/Pop
- Length: 54:35
- Label: Sony Music Entertainment

Tokio chronology
Blowing (1996)	Best E.P Selection of Tokio (1996)	Wild & Mild (1997)

Best E.P Selection of Tokio is the first compilation album by Japanese band Tokio. It was released on March 26, 1997. The album reached fourth place on the Oricon weekly chart and charted for five weeks.

== Track listing ==
All lyrics are written by Tetsuo Kudou, except where indicated; all music is composed by Takashi Tsushimi, except where indicated; all music is arranged by Ryoumei Shirai, except where indicated.

No.	Title	Lyrics	Music	Arrangement	Length
1.	"Kaze ni Natte" (Studio Live Mix)		Ryoumei Shirai		4:07
2.	"Ticket to Lov" (Gimme Gimme Mix)				3:57
3.	"Uwasa no Kiss" (Brighter Mix)				3:29
4.	"Soko Nashi Love (New Sokonashi Mix)" (New Sokonashi Mix)				3:55
5.	"Sayonara Kara Torimodose"		Ichirou Kou		5:02
6.	"Magic Channel" (Special Mix)	Zenji Nagahata; Hiroshi Yamada	Nagahata	Tatsuya Nishiwaki	4:13
7.	"Mirai wa Sense"	Kanata Asamizu	Nishiwaki	Nishiwaki	3:39
8.	"Zettai!"	Asamizu	Nishiwaki	Nishiwaki	4:16
9.	"Tokio wo Yoroshiku!"	Shigeru Joshima; Hiroshi Yamada	Nishiwaki	Nishiwaki	3:57
10.	"Ashita no Kimi wo Mamoritai"				5:29
11.	"Heart wo Migakukyanai"	Rui Serizawa			3:56
12.	"Love You Only"				3:55
13.	"Arigatou...Yuki" (Hyper Energy Mix)	Yasuhiko Akasaka	Toshinobu Kubota	Manabu Tsuchiya	4:32
Total length:					54:35

== Personnel ==
- Shigeru Joshima - guitar
- Tomoya Nagase - lead vocalist, guitar
- Masahiro Matsuoka - drums
- Taichi Kokubun - keyboard
- Tatsuya Yamaguchi - bass
- Hiromu Kojima - rhythm guitarist, replaced by Tomoya Nagase

== Release history ==
Region	Date	Format	Distributing Label	Catalogue codes
Japan	August 26, 1996	CD	Sony	SRCL-3630
South Korea	March 4, 2004	CD	Sony	2285527
