= Blowing (album) =

Studio album by Tokio
- Released: March 25, 1996
- Genre: Japanese Rock/Pop
- Length: 53:35
- Label: Sony Music Entertainment

Tokio chronology
Bad Boys Bound (1995)	Blowing (1996)	Best E.P Selection of Tokio (1996)

Blowing is the third studio album by Japanese band Tokio. It was released on March 25, 1996. The album reached seventh place on the Oricon weekly chart and charted for six weeks. The opening track, Seven o'Clock News, is notable for its inclusion in the original Japanese release of the anime series, Kodocha.

== Track listing ==
No.	Title	Lyrics	Music	Arrangement	Length
1.	"19ji no News (19時のニュース) [Seven o'Clock (19:00) News]"	Kanata Asamizu	Tatsuya Nishiwaki	Tatsuya Nishiwaki	4:20
2.	"Ballad for Pure Generation"	Shouta Namikawa	KARA	Tatsuya Nishiwaki	4:32
3.	"Anoko wo Sagashite"	Tetsuo Kudou	Takashi Tsushimi	Ryoumei Shirai	4:40
4.	"Sukisa ~ Ticket to Love"	Tetsuo Kudou	Takashi Tsushimi	Ryoumei Shirai	4:01
5.	"Goodbye Baby"	Tetsuo Kudou	Hideki Aoki	Tohru Shigemi	4:18
6.	"Just You, Take You - Kimi no Hitomi ni Tokete Iku"	Tetsuo Kudou	Takashi Tsushimi	Tatsuya Nishiwaki	4:10
7.	"Sayonara Kara Torimodose"	Tetsuo Kudou	Ichirou Kou	Ryoumei Shirai	5:02
8.	"Soko Nashi Love"	Tetsuo Kudou	Takashi Tsushimi	Ryoumei Shirai	4:26
9.	"Namida no Wedding Bell"	Hiroshi Yamada	Ichirou Kou	Ryoumei Shirai	5:12
10.	"Jitto Mitsumete"	Kanata Asamizu	Tetsuji Hayashi	Tatsuya Nishiwaki	4:30
11.	"Zettai!"	Kanata Asamizu	Tatsuya Nishiwaki	Tatsuya Nishiwaki	4:17
12.	"Kaze ni Natte"	Tetsuo Kudou	Ryoumei Shirai	Ryoumei Shirai	4:09

== Personnel ==
- Shigeru Joshima - guitar
- Tomoya Nagase - lead vocalist, guitar
- Masahiro Matsuoka - drums
- Taichi Kokubun - keyboard
- Tatsuya Yamaguchi - bass
