= Harvest (Tokio album) =

Studio album by Tokio
- Released: October 18, 2006
- Genre: Japanese Rock/Pop
- Length: 1:22:44
- Label: Universal Music

Tokio chronology
Act II (2005)	Harvest (2006)	Sugar (2008)

Harvest is the tenth studio album by Japanese band Tokio, released on October 18, 2006. It is one of Tokio's most successful albums, having peaked at second place on the Oricon weekly charts and charted for eighteen weeks.

== Track listing ==
=== Disc 1 ===
No.	Title	Lyrics	Music	Arrangement	Length
1.	"Cadence"	Hikari	Hikari	Hikari	4:31
2.	"Ashita o Mezashite!"	Tomoya Nagase	Tomoya Nagase	Tomoya Nagase and Motoki Funayama	4:20
3.	"Get Your Dream"	Takeshi	Tsukasa	Kazz	4:05
4.	"Sorafune"	Miyuki Nakajima	Miyuki Nakajima	Motoki Funayama	4:01
5.	"undid"	Shigeru Joshima	Taichi Kokubun	Hikari	4:48
6.	"The One to Me"	Yuuki Shirai and Aratamika	Kazuhiro Yamahara	Kazuhiro Yamahara	4:17
7.	"Your Answer"	Otoki	Masahiro Matsuoka	Masahiro Matsuoka and Kazuhiro Yamahara	4:39
8.	"Boku no Renai Jijō to Daidokoro Jijō"	Shigeru Joshima	Shigeru Joshima	Taku Yoshioka and Youichi Murata	5:17
9.	"Happy Birthday"	Masahiro Matsuoka	Masahiro Matsuoka	Masahiro Matsuoka and KAM	2:34
10.	"Mr. Traveling Man"	Akio Shimizu	Akio Shimizu	Masahide Sakuma	4:08
11.	"Uta ni Shichaimashita"	Taichi Kokubun	Taichi Kokubun	Taichi Kokubun	4:19
12.	"Gourmet Fighter!"	Tomoya Nagase	Tomoya Nagase	Tomoya Nagase	4:04
13.	"No More Bet"	Masahiro Matsuoka	Masahiro Matsuoka	Masahiro Matsuoka and Kazuhiro Yamahara	4:12
14.	"Starving Man"	Tatsuya Yamaguchi	Tatsuya Yamaguchi	Tatsuya Yamaguchi and KAM	4:04
15.	"Sonic Drive!"	Tomoya Nagase	Tomoya Nagase	Tomoya Nagase	4:12
16.	"Do! Do! Do!"	Takeshi	Takeshi	3-5-2	4:24
17.	"Image"	Tomoya Nagase	Tomoya Nagase	Tomoya Nagase	5:59

=== Disc 2 ===
No.	Title	Lyrics	Music	Arrangement	Length
1.	"Mr Traveling Man (#2)"	Akio Shimizu	Akio Shimizu	Masahide Sakuma and KAM	4:48
2.	"Sorafune (Orchestra version)"	Miyuki Nakajima	Miyuki Nakajima	Yasumasa Satou	4:10

== Release history ==
Region	Date	Format	Distributing Label	Catalogue codes
Japan	October 18, 2006	CD, CD/DVD	Universal J	UPCH-1528, UPCH-9278
Taiwan	November 17, 2006	CD	Universal	450 527-7
South Korea	December 21, 2006	CD	Universal	2341495
