= Haruka (Tokio song) =

"Haruka 遥か"

Single by Tokio
- Released: June 16, 2010
- Recorded: 2010
- Genre: Pop, rock
- Label: J Storm
- Songwriter(s): Nobuteru Maeda, Michiya Haruhata

Tokio singles chronology
"Advance/Mata Asa ga Kuru" (2010)	"Haruka 遥か" (2010)	"NaNaNa (Taiyo Nante Irane)" (2010)

"Haruka" (-遥か-, Distant) is the forty-third single by the Japanese band Tokio. It was released on February 3, 2010 under the label J Storm. The single topped the Oricon weekly singles chart. The songs "Haruka" and "Dash Village" are being used as theme songs for the Dash Beach and the Dash Village respectively, both segments on Tokio's long-running variety show, The Tetsuwan Dash. The Dash Village theme was originally composed by Tokio's lead singer Tomoya Nagase just shortly after the village itself was built in 2000. It has been used as the main theme since, though the version on this single is a re-recording.

== Track listing ==
"Haruka" was released in three different versions:

Regular Edition
No.	Title	Lyrics	Music	Arrangement	Length
1.	"Haruka" (-遥か- "Distant")	Nobuteru Maeda	Michiya Haruhata	Kazuhiro Yamahara (山原 一浩, Yamahara Kazuhiro)
2.	"Everlasting"	Yūya Abe (阿部 祐也, Abe Yūya)	Yamahara	Yamahara
3.	"Dash Village" (Instrumental)		Tomoya Nagase	Kam
4.	"Haruka" (Backing Track)
5.	"Everlasting" (Backing Track)

Limited Edition 1, Limited Edition 2
No.	Title	Lyrics	Music	Arrangement	Length
1.	"Haruka"	Maeda	Haruhata	Yamahara
2.	"Haruka" (Backing Track)

Limited Edition 1 DVD
No.	Title	Length
1.	"Haruka" (Music video, story version)
2.	"Haruka" (Making of)

Limited Edition 2 DVD
No.	Title	Length
1.	"Haruka" (Music video, various beaches version)
2.	"Haruka" (Making of)

== Charts and certifications ==
=== Charts ===
Chart (2010)	Peak position
Japan Oricon Weekly Singles Chart	1

=== Sales and certifications ===
Country	Provider	Sales	Certification
Japan	RIAJ	48,688	—
