= Kōkōsei Restaurant =

- Poster
- Genre: Drama
- Starring: Masahiro Matsuoka
- Theme music composer: Hattori Takayuki
- Ending theme: "Miageta Ryūsei" by Tokio
- Country of origin: Japan
- Original language: Japanese
- No. of seasons: 1
- No. of episodes: 9 (list of episodes)

Production
- Production locations: Mie Prefecture, Yamanashi Prefecture
- Cinematography: Masahiro Yoshimoto; Atsushi Yamazaki; Nonji Nemoto
- Editor: Minoru Takahashi
- Camera setup: Multi-camera
- Running time: 54 minutes Ep. 1: 15-minute extension
- Production companies: Office Crescendo Co,.Ltd., Nippon Television

Original release
- Network: NTV
- Release: 7 May – 2 July 2011

Kōkōsei Restaurant (高校生レストラン, Kōkōsei Resutoran; lit. "High School Student Restaurant") is a 2011 Japanese television series that is based on actual events. This television series stars Masahiro Matsuoka, a member of the J-pop band Tokio, as the lead character.

This 9-episode television series was aired from 7 May 2011 to 2 July 2011 on the Nippon Television network's "Saturday Dramas" program. Kokosei Restaurant garnered an average viewership rating of 10.68% throughout the Kanto region.

== Plot ==
Shingo Muraki has voluntarily resigned from his job as a chef in a restaurant in Ginza after an argument with a customer. He reluctantly takes the job of advising a soon-to-open restaurant that is run by high-school students from his hometown. Along the way, Muraki faces many problems caused by the town council, who are anxious to justify the taxpayers' money is being used prudently.

== Cast ==
- Masahiro Matsuoka as Shingo Muraki, a chef who previously moved to Tokyo to pursue his cooking career, ignoring his father's wish that he take over the family's temple. However, he moves back to his hometown to take up the job of advising a restaurant that is run by a local high school.
- Hideaki Itō as Hiroshi Kishino, a town hall member who is in charge of this project. He has been Shingo's friend since elementary school.
- Yuka Itaya as Ayaka Yoshisaki, the head teacher of Sōgo High School. She is opposed to the plan of setting up a restaurant run by students of the high school, and repeatedly comes into conflict with Shingo.

=== Students ===
- Shuhei Nomura as Koichi Nakamura, a third-year student and the head chef of Kokosei Restaurant
- Ryunosuke Kamiki as Yosuke Sakamoto, a third-year student and the assistant head chef of Kokosei Restaurant
- Umika Kawashima as Mai Yonemoto, a second-year student who later takes on the role of head chef
- Yuki Shibamoto
- Rena Nounen as Maho Miyazawa
- Takuya Kusakawa as Tsuyoshi Miyashita
- Ayaka Miyoshi as Manami Kawase
- Reiko Fujiwara as Sayuri Takagi, a second-year student. She quits the restaurant briefly because she thinks Shingo is too harsh, but is persuaded by her friends to return to work.
- Ryutarou Akimoto as Shota Tamura, a second-year student

=== The Muraki family ===
- Kazue Fukiishi as Haruka Muraki, Shingo's sister
- Yoshio Harada as Sadatoshi Muraki, Shingo's father. He is a priest at the town's temple.

== Background information ==
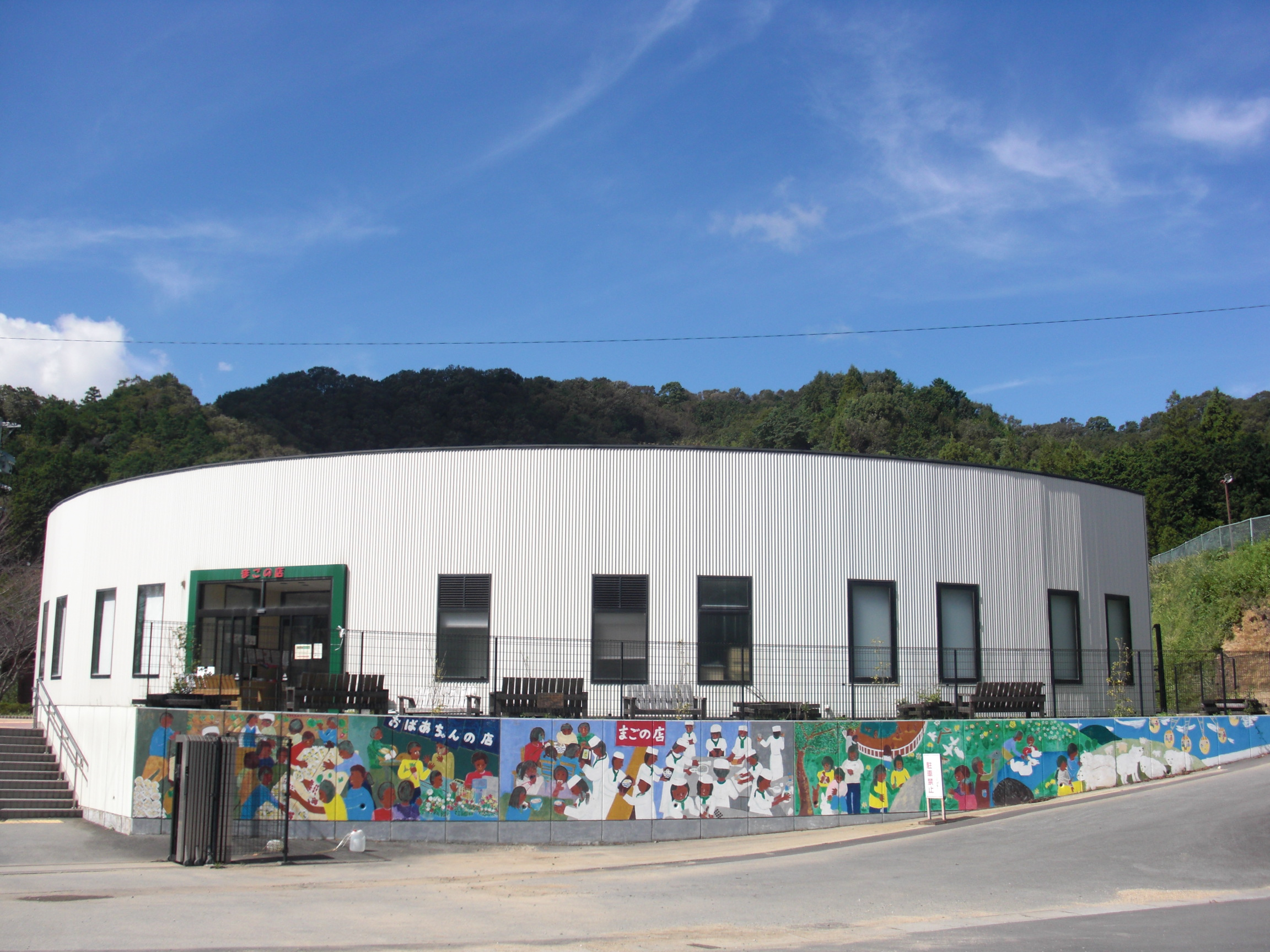
"Mago no Mise"

On 13 February 2005, Mie Prefectural Ōka High School opened Japan's first restaurant run by high-school students. This restaurant, named "Mago no Mise" (まごの店), was built at a cost of 89 million yen. The students running the business are recruited from the high school's cooking club. According to Shingo Murabayashi, the founder of the restaurant and the cooking club adviser, "Mago no Mise" serves around 200 to 250 customers per day and has won several awards at national cooking contests. It is currently the only restaurant in Japan that is run by a public high school.

The story of "Mago no Mise" was documented in two books, Kōkōsei resutoran, honjitsu mo manseki. (高校生レストラン、本日も満席。, Lit:High School Student Restaurant, Fully Booked Today) and Kōkōsei Restoran, Gyōretsu no Riyū. (高校生レストラン、行列の理由。, Lit:High School Student Restaurant, Reason Behind its Operation). These books were written by Shingo Murabayashi and published by Ise Shimbun. The television series is based on events that happened at "Mago no Mise".

== Production ==
The television series was first announced on 22 February 2011. It was also revealed that Matsuoka Masahiro, a member of the J-pop band Tokio, would star in the series as Shingo Muraki. This character is based on Shingo Murabayashi, the founder of "Mago no Mise". This is Matsuoka's seventh role in a drama series shown on NTV's Saturday Dramas time-slot, setting a new record. He previously starred in television series such as the drama adaptation of the manga Psychometrer Eiji.

The supporting cast members were announced on 11 March 2011. Ryunosuke Kamiki and Umika Kawashima play the roles of students working at the restaurant. Actor Hideaki Itō, the star of the film Umizaru, plays the role of an official from the local town hall. His character is based on Masayuki Kishikawa, a town hall official who worked on the "Mago no Mise" project.

== Episodes ==
No.	Title	Original release date	Japan viewership rating (Kanto region)
1	"The Chef Teacher"; Transliteration: "Itamae kyōshi" (Japanese: 板前教師)	May 7, 2011	13.1%
2	"Set Meal for the Shop Opening"; Transliteration: "Kaiten ryōri" (Japanese: 開店料理)	May 14, 2011	11.2%
3	"Congratulations for the Shop Opening!"; Transliteration: "Iwai! Kaiten" (Japanese: 祝! 開店)	May 21, 2011	10.9%
4	"Mago Restaurant's Chadzuke"; Transliteration: "Mago chadzuke" (Japanese: まご茶漬)	May 28, 2011	11.3%
5	"An Excursion or a Cooking Course?"; Transliteration: "Ensoku VS kōsu ryōri" (Japanese: 遠足VSコース料理)	June 4, 2011	11.5%
6	"Recipes or the Taste of Mother's Cooking?"; Transliteration: "Reshipi VS Hahaoya no Aji" (Japanese: レシピVS母親の味)	June 11, 2011	8.7%
7	"The Crisis of the Cooking Section being Split up" Transliteration: "Chōri-bu bunretsu no kiki" (Japanese: 調理部分裂の危機)	June 11, 2011	10.2%
8	"The Final Chapter: Crisis of Survival"; Transliteration: "Sai shūshō ~ shūkatsu kiki" (Japanese: 最終章～就活危機)	June 25, 2011	9.5%
9	"Dreams Come True"; Transliteration: "Yume wa kanau" (Japanese: 夢はかなう)	July 2, 2011	9.7%
