= Taiyō to Sabaku no Bara/Subeki Koto =

"Taiyō to Sabaku no Bara / Subeki Koto"

Single by Tokio
- Released: August 19, 2009
- Recorded: 2009
- Genre: J-pop, Rock
- Label: J-Storm
- Songwriter(s): See text

Tokio singles chronology
| "Amagasa/Akireru Kurai Bokura wa Negaō" (2008) | "Taiyō to Sabaku no Bara / Subeki Koto" (2009) | "Advance/Mata Asa ga Kuru" (2010) |

"Taiyō to Sabaku no Bara"/"Subeki Koto" is the forty-first single by the Japanese band Tokio. It was the first single released by Tokio in eleven months, having been released on August 19, 2009. The single reached third place on the Oricon charts and charted for three weeks. The song "Taiyō to Sabaku no Bara" is used as the theme song to the drama show Karei Naru Spy. The song "Subeki Koto" is currently being used as the ending theme song to 5LDK, a talk show hosted by Tokio.

== Track listing ==
"Taiyō to Sabaku no Bara / Subeki Koto" was released in three different versions:

=== CD Normal Edition ===
| No. | Title | Lyrics | Music | Arrangement | Length |
|---|---|---|---|---|---|
| 1. | "Taiyō to Sabaku no Bara" | Akio Shimizu | Akio Shimizu | Akio Shimizu |
| 2. | "Subeki Koto" | Shigeru Joshima | Taichi Kokubun | Noma Kousuke |
| 3. | "Chikai" | Shigeru Joshima | Shigeru Joshima | Kam |
| 4. | "Cross Fade" | | Hikari | Hikari |
| 5. | "Taiyō to Sabaku no Bara (Backing Track)" |
| 6. | "Subeki Koto (Backing Track)" |

=== Limited Edition A ===
CD
| No. | Title | Lyrics | Music | Arrangement | Length |
|---|---|---|---|---|---|
| 1. | "Taiyō to Sabaku no Bara" | Akio Shimizu | Akio Shimizu | Akio Shimizu |
| 2. | "Subeki Koto" | Shigeru Joshima | Taichi Kokubun | Noma Kousuke |

DVD
| No. | Title | Length |
|---|---|---|
| 1. | "Taiyō to Sabaku no Bara (Music Video)" |
| 2. | "Taiyō to Sabaku no Bara (Making Clip)" |
| 3. | "Subeki Koto (Music Video)" |
| 4. | "Subeki Koto (Making Clip)" |

=== Limited Edition B ===
CD
| No. | Title | Lyrics | Music | Arrangement | Length |
|---|---|---|---|---|---|
| 1. | "Taiyō to Sabaku no Bara" | Akio Shimizu | Akio Shimizu | Akio Shimizu |
| 2. | "Subeki Koto" | Shigeru Joshima | Taichi Kokubun | Noma Kousuke |

DVD
| No. | Title | Length |
|---|---|---|
| 1. | "Subeki Koto (Music Video)" |
| 2. | "Subeki Koto (Making Clip)" |
| 3. | "Tokio Station II: Hanasubekikoto Han" |
