= Blowin' =

Blowin' may refer to:

- "Blowin'" (song), a 1992 song by B'z
- Blowin' (album), a 1976 album by The Noel Redding Band

== See also ==
- Blowing, a 1996 album by Tokio
