= Yasuko to Kenji =

Japanese manga series

ヤスコとケンジ
- Manga
- Written by: Aruko
- Published by: Shueisha
- Magazine: Bessatsu Margaret
- Original run: April 2005 – November 2006
- Volumes: 5
- Television drama
- Directed by: Taro Otani (ep1-2,5,8,10); Makoto Naganuma (長沼 誠) (ep3-4,7); Miyuki Honma (本間美由紀) (ep6,9)
- Produced by: Tetsuhiro Ogino (荻野哲弘); Yukitoshi Chiba (千葉行利); Manami Mita (三田真奈美)
- Music by: Michiru Oshima
- Original network: Nippon Television
- Original run: July 12, 2008 – September 20, 2008
- Episodes: 10

Yasuko to Kenji (ヤスコとケンジ; lit. "Yasuko and Kenji") is a Japanese manga series written and illustrated by Aruko. Yasuko to Kenji was serialized in the shōjo manga magazine Bessatsu Margaret from April 2005 to November 2006. In 2008, the series was adapted into a comedy drama which aired in Japan on Nippon Television.

== Plot ==
The show focuses on a man named Kenji and his younger sister Yasuko, whose parents died in an accident 10 years earlier. Kenji was once the leader of a gang, but in order to support him and his sister, he began making a living as a shōjo manga artist. His character normally wears glasses and appears to be a gentle guy, but he throws off his glasses and reverts to his violent side whenever he tries to protect Yasuko from danger. Part of the story follows Yasuko's romance with an intelligent and good-looking man named Jun Tsubaki. Jun's older sister Erika Tsubaki now runs a flower shop, but Erika was once a leader of a female gang, and she used to be in love with Kenji during those days.

== Media ==
=== Live action drama ===
Masahiro Matsuoka's band Tokio performed the theme song, "Amagasa," which was written by Ringo Sheena.

==== List of episodes ====
Episode	Title
01	My older brother used to be in a biker gang! I will protect my little sister... This is my justice!!
02	The confession of a pure-hearted female biker gang boss !
03	Rampage!! The arranged marriage strategy: fried eggs of tears
04	A teary-eyed birthday present for my little sister
05	Tsubaki's rival in love!? I'll protect Yasuko
06	The pure love between two ex-yankees is lost
07	They know his true identity!? The cosplay double strategy
08	For you, brother! A teary-eyed manga illustrator comeback strategy!
09	A sad conclusion... Save your younger sister's first love!!
10	The fate of a 10-year love... We've got you covered, brother!

==== Cast ====
- Masahiro Matsuoka as Oki Kenji
- Ryōko Hirosue as Tsubaki Erika
- Mikako Tabe as Oki Yasuko
- Tadayoshi Okura as Tsubaki Jun
- Haruna Kojima as Shingyoji Hiyoko
