= Yesterday & Today (Tokio album) =

Studio album by Tokio
- Released: February 2, 2000
- Genre: Japanese Rock/Pop
- Length: 55:38
- Label: Sony Music Entertainment

Tokio chronology
Graffiti (1998)	Yesterday & Today (2000)	Best EP Selection of Tokio II (2001)

Yesterday & Today is the sixth studio album by Japanese band Tokio. It was released on February 2, 2000. It was the last album by Tokio to be released under Sony Music Entertainment. The album reached ninth place on the Oricon weekly chart and charted for three weeks.

== Track listing ==
No.	Title	Lyrics	Music	Arrangement	Length
1.	"Overture"	—	Project T	Project T	1:04
2.	"Yesterday's"	Akio Shimizu	Akio Shimizu	Project T	4:14
3.	"Feel It"	Satori Shiraishi	Satori Shiraishi	Project T	4:27
4.	"Nandomo Yume no Naka de Kurikaesu Love Song (Tokio Edit)"	Kiyoshiro Imawano	Kiyoshiro Imawano	Project T	4:21
5.	"Heart"	Natsumi Watanabe	Akio Shimizu	Project T	4:16
6.	"Wasurēnu Kimi e... (Remix)"	Akio Shimizu; Mariko Okabe	Akio Shimizu	Toshiyuki Mori	4:42
7.	"Cool So Rock"	Shigeru Joshima	Shigeru Joshima	Project T	4:18
8.	"Ichi-byō no Othello – Kimi ni Senbaretai (Matsu Remix)"	Yasushi Akimoto	Kyōhei Tsutsumi	Soul Toul	3:47
9.	"Junkfood no Gyakushu"	Seriko Natsuno	Miki Watanabe	Toshiyuki Mori	4:10
10.	"Kimi o Omou Toki (Romanesque Version)"	Natsumi Watanabe	Miki Watanabe	Soul Toul; Ryūta Yoshimura; Kaio Tsuruta	5:15
11.	"Break Down"	Tomoya Nagase	Tomoya Nagase	Project T	4:56
12.	"Love & Peace (Play-Out Version)"	Mariko Okabe	Ryōichi Higuchi	Project T	3:37
13.	"Jumbo"	Kaio Tsuruta	Kaio Tsuruta	Project T	3:45
14.	"Yesterday's (Reprise)"	—	Kaio Tsuruta	Kaio Tsuruta	2:54
