= That's Cunning! Shijō Saidai no Sakusen? =

That's Cunning! Shijo Saidai no Sakusen?
- Kanji: Ｔｈａｔ’ｓカンニング！史上最大の作戦？
- Directed by: Hiroshi Sugawara
- Starring: Tatsuya Yamaguchi; Namie Amuro
- Release date: 1996
- Country: Japan
- Language: Japanese

That's Cunning! Shijo Saidai no Sakusen? (Japanese: Ｔｈａｔ’ｓカンニング！史上最大の作戦) is a 1996 comedy film directed by Hiroshi Sugawara. It stars Tatsuya Yamaguchi and Namie Amuro. Directed by Hiroshi Sugawara, it centers on a group of students who develop cheating schemes in a fight to expose a corrupt professor who is intent on making profit off their university.

== Plot ==
A group of students head to a university class hall for an exam. Among them are residents of Sigma dormitory house, who organizes a cheating scam; one of them, Kenji Kimura, aims to graduate and do research under the much-admired Professor Namazuda, doesn't cheat. After some time, Kimura's high school friend, Yumi Morishita, also starts cheating. During the exam, Professor Yuusuke Migita, through binoculars, spots Kamei cheating. When he comes to the hall, Kimura who had feelings for Morishita worries that Migita has seen her cheating, but is relieved when Migita calls out Kamei instead, who is expelled. Later, Kimura attempts to help Kamei re-enter the university, but Migita refuses.

Unknown to the university population, Migita, despite his strict nature, is shown to be corrupt after he conspires with the institution's chairman, a conglomerate head, and construction company president, on a plan to demolish all the dormitories and build a hotel to make money. They have a board meeting regarding the issue and it is decided that the plan will be executed if the students cannot pass the exams with good grades.

The next day, Professor Namazuda comes to one of the dorms and informs them about the decision from the meeting. The students were depressed upon hearing the news. Morishita takes up temporary residence at Sigma dorm after being evicted from her hostel due to her pet cat. Later on, she decides to spy on Migita and goes to his office under the pretense of doing research under him. He agrees and asks her to shred some papers. While finishing the task, Morishita becomes suspicious when she discovers Professor Namazuda's atomic theory papers, which Migita stole to plagiarize for his own. After eavesdropping on Migita's conversation between the construction company president about the hotel plan, she becomes convinced of the former's corruption and realizes to her horror that the stolen papers are a plot to get rid of Namazuda but she is seen by Migita's assistant who warns Migita while having sex with him in the library. Despite this, Morishita rushes to the dormitory and tells all the residents about Migita's plan, which they then report to Professor Namazuda.

In class, Migita warns the students that he will never tolerate cheating in the finals. After class, Kimura, who was angry at Migita for his plan to get rid of Namazuda, rushed to Migita with other students about the dorm issue. Migita explains that he is simply trying to help the college and also provokes them by calling them dumb. Kimura then offers a challenge that if they get good grades, Kamei will be allowed to return. He agrees under the condition that they get all an A grade in every subject, further depressing them. With encouragement from Namazuda, who also reveals of his cheating scheme during his years as a student, Kimura decides and announces that all of them are going to cheat in final exams.

The exams are then given and the friends use their methods given by Namazuda to succeed. Migita becomes agitated when he sees that every student of Sigma dorm acquired an A grade in all subjects, causing him to conclude that they cheated and decides to take the matter in his hands. Morishita is again called by Migita to shred some papers, which turn out to be the upcoming final exam question paper. Morishita tries to steal it, but Migita forces her to shred it. The Sigma dorm students manage to retrieve the shredded papers and, with much effort, managed to reconstruct the final exam. Kimura starts memorizing the answers during which he is visited by Morishita. Kimura asks how long she is going to say her, making her sad. Morishita confesses that she liked him.

On the day of exam, the students were confident that they will succeed in this one too. However, they later realized that they were tricked by Migita. They tried to cheat but Migita doesn't let them. After sometime, two of the invigilators suddenly contract stomachache, due to Mr. Chin mixing something in their food. One of them is trapped in the electric room by Mr. Chin, who also cuts the power of the exam hall. Armed with a laser sniper rifle, Kamei helps his fellow students to cheat with answers being given by Professor Namazuda. Migita tries and fails to find the cause of the cheating, making the students narrowly completing the exam.

After the exam, all the students and Morishita were asked to leave except the Sigma dorm boys. A failed strip search makes Kimura remind Migita of his promise, which the latter denies them. Suddenly, the university president, who has discovered Migita's corrupt plans, enters with the conglomerate head, construction president, and chairman in custody, to which Migita denies his involvement. However, Migita's researcher proves his involvement and also exposes more of the former's acts of corruption including his plagiarism from other professors. The president reveals to the devastated Migita of legal action against him and that the dormitories will remain, much to the joy of the students.

Migita's researchers realize that all students have cheated when they were checking the papers. Meanwhile, a depressed Migita accidentally knocks over a chemical bottle, causing an explosion that injures him. Kimura then confesses his love for Morishita, who declares that she will drop out and become a junior high school teacher, using the cheating method developed by Professor Namazuda, and they embrace.

== Cast ==
- Tatsuya Yamaguchi as Kimura Kenji
- Namie Amuro as Morishita Yumi
- Tarō Yamamoto as Rikimaru
- Naohito Fujiki as Esaki
- Takeshi Masu as Professor Yusuke Migita
