= Hiroshi Sugawara =

Japanese film director and producer (1955–2025)

- Born: Hiroshi Sugawara; 1955
- Died: 12 November 2025 (aged 70)
- Occupations: Film director and producer

Hiroshi Sugawara (菅原 浩志; 1955 – 12 November 2025) was a Japanese film director, producer and screenwriter. He died from pancreatic cancer on 12 November 2025, at the age of 70.

== Filmography ==
=== Director ===
- Seven Days' War (1988)
- That's Cunning! Shijo Saidai no Sakusen (1996)
- Tokimeki Memorial (1997)
- Magnitude (1997)
- Dreammaker (1999)
- Drug (2001)
- Fireflies: River of Light (2003)
- Hayazaki no Hana (2006)- Forget-me-not
- Shashin Koshien Summer in 0.5 Seconds (2017)
- Songs of Kamui (2023)

=== Producer ===
- Legend of Eight Samurai: Satomi Hakken-den (1983)
- Aijou Monogatari (1984)
- The Closest Island to Heaven: Tengoku ni Ichiban Chikai Shima (1985)
- Second Generation is Christian: Nidaime wa Kurisuchan (1985)
- Cabaret (1986)
- Three Penny Opera (1989)
- Shogun (1990)
- Ruby Cairo (1993)

=== Screenwriter ===
- Seven Days' War (1988)
- Magnitude (1997)
- Dreammaker (1999)
- Fireflies: River of Light (2003)
- Hayazaki no Hana (2006)
- Shashin Koshien Summer in 0.5 Seconds (2017)
- Songs of Kamui (2023)

=== Production Manager ===
- Ten to Chi to: Heaven and Earth (1990)
