= Advance/Mata Asa ga Kuru =

Single by Tokio
- Released: February 3, 2010
- Genre: Pop, rock
- Label: J Storm
- Songwriters: Advance: Makoto Kogata; Mata Asa ga Kuru: Kazuhiro Yamahara, Yūya

Tokio singles chronology
"Taiyō to Sabaku no Bara/Subeki Koto" (2009)	"Advance/Mata Asa ga Kuru" (2010)	"Haruka" (2010)

"Advance/Mata Asa ga Kuru" is the forty-second single by the Japanese band Tokio. It was released on February 3, 2010, under the label J Storm. The single peaked at number five on the Oricon weekly chart. The song "Mata Asa ga Kuru" is used as a theme song to the NHK drama show Romes/Kūkō Bōkyo System. The song "Cry for the Moon" is used as a theme song for the Fuji TV drama 0 Goushitsu no Kaku. The song "Advance" is used in a commercial for Yamato Transport.

== Track listing ==
"Advance/Mata Asa ga Kuru" was released in three different versions:

=== CD-only version ===
No.	Title	Lyrics	Music	Arrangement	Length
1.	"Advance"	Makoto Kogata	Makoto Kogata	Syōgō Ōnishi
2.	"Mata Asa ga Kuru" (また朝が来る)	Kazuhiro Yamahara, Yūya	Yamahara	Yamahara
3.	"Cry for the Moon"	Hirō Ooyagi	Ooyagi	Hirō Ooyagi
4.	"Period"	Akio Shimizu	Shimizu	Seikō Nagaoka
5.	"Advance" (Backing Track)
6.	"Mata Asa ga Kuru" (Backing Track)
7.	"Cry for the Moon" (Backing Track)

=== CD+DVD version 1 ===
CD
No.	Title	Lyrics	Music	Arrangement	Length
1.	"Advance"	Kogata	Kogata	Syōgō
2.	"Mata Asa ga Kuru"	Yamahara, Abe	Yamahara	Yamahara

DVD
No.	Title	Length
1.	"Advance" (Music Video)
2.	"Advance" (Making Clip)

=== CD+DVD version 2 ===
CD
No.	Title	Lyrics	Music	Arrangement	Length
1.	"Advance"	Kogata	`Kogata	Syōgō
2.	"Mata Asa ga Kuru"	Yamahara, Abe	Yamahara	Yamahara

DVD
No.	Title	Length
1.	"Mata Asa ga Kuru" (Music Video)
2.	"Mata Asa ga Kuru" (Making Clip)
