= Tokio (album) =

Studio album by Tokio
- Released: November 21, 1994
- Genres: Rock; pop
- Length: 44:02
- Label: Sony Music Records

Tokio chronology
Tokio (1994)	Tokio Remix (1995)

Singles from Tokio
- 1. "Love You Only" Released: September 21, 1994; 2. "Ashita no Kimi o Mamoritai (Yamato 2520)" Released: December 12, 1994

Tokio is the debut album by Japanese band Tokio. It was released on November 21, 1994. It reached eighth place on the Oricon weekly chart and charted for thirteen weeks.

== Track listing ==
No.	Title	Lyrics	Music	Arrangement	Length
1.	"Love You Only"	Tetsuo Kudō	Takashi Tsushimi	Tatsuya Nishiwaki	3:56
2.	"Konna ni Aishiteru no Ni" (こんなに愛しているのに)	Tetsuo Kudō	Takashi Tsushimi	Ryōmei Shirai	4:20
3.	"Koi no Curricula Machine" (恋のカリキュラマシーン)	Rolly Teranishi	Rolly Teranishi	Ryōmei Shirai	4:10
4.	"Sherry Amour" (シェリー・アムール)	Sora Hibino	Hideki Aoki	Ryōmei Shirai	4:38
5.	"Ashita no Kimi o Mamoritai (Yamato 2520) (Album Version)" (明日の君を守りたい)	Tetsuo Kudō	Takashi Tsushimi	Ryōmei Shirai	5:31
6.	"Romanticist wa Kizutsukanai" (ロマンチストは傷つかない)	Kang Jin-hwa	Hideki Aoki	Ryōmei Shirai	3:19
7.	"Sugao no Mama de I Love You" (素顔のままでアイ・ラヴ・ユー)	Tetsuo Kudō	Takashi Tsushimi	Tatsuya Nishiwaki	3:53
8.	"Shijō Saidai no Crazy Love" (史上最大のクレイジー・ラヴ)	Kang Jin-hwa	Hideki Aoki	Ryōmei Shirai	3:46
9.	"White X'mas Eve"	Tetsuo Kudō	Takashi Tsushimi	Tatsuya Nishiwaki	6:15
10.	"Jidai (Tokio) o Yoroshiku!" (時代(TOKIO)をよろしく！)	Shigeru Joshima; Hiroshi Yamada	Tatsuya Nishiwaki	Tatsuya Nishiwaki	3:58
