= Best EP Selection of Tokio II =

Greatest hits album by Tokio
- Released: May 9, 2001
- Genre: Rock, Pop
- Length: 1:14:47
- Label: Sony Music Entertainment

Tokio chronology
Yesterday & Today (2000)	Best EP Selection of Tokio II (2001)	5 Ahead (2001)

Best EP Selection of Tokio II is the second compilation album by Japanese band Tokio. It was released on May 9, 2001. It is the band's second of three compilation albums, with the first being, Best E.P Selection of Tokio. It reached sixth place on the Oricon weekly chart and charted for nine weeks.

== Track listing ==
No.	Title	Lyrics	Music	Arrangement	Length
1.	"Everybody Can Do!"	Narumi Yamamoto	Naoya Akimoto	Naoya Akimoto	4:13
2.	"Furarete Genki"	You Waki	Takeshi Kamigōri	Norio Inoue	3:28
3.	"Dash for the Dream"	Yoshihiko Andō	K. Makaino	K. Makaino	4:52
4.	"Julia"	Joe Rinoie	Joe Rinoie	Joe Rinoie; Masaki Suzukawa	4:51
5.	"Atatte Kudakero!"	Mariko Okabe	Kazuyoshi Baba	Takayuki Hijikata	3:30
6.	"Kono Yubi Tomare!"	You Waki	You Waki	Masahide Sakuma	4:39
7.	"Love & Peace"	Mariko Okabe	Ryōichi Higuchi	Masahide Sakuma	3:39
8.	"Kimi o Omou Toki"	Natsumi Watanabe	Miki Watanabe	Soul Toul; Ryūta Yoshimura	5:18
9.	"Oh! Heaven"	Yoshimasa Inoue; Shōko Fujibayashi	Yoshimasa Inoue	Yoshimasa Inoue	4:41
10.	"Nandomo Yume no Naka de Kurikaesu Love Song"	Kiyoshiro Imawano	Kiyoshiro Imawano	Kiyoshiro Imawano; Kaname	5:57
11.	"Afureru Omoi"	Natsumi Watanabe	Akio Shimizu	Soul Toul; Kaio Tsuruta	4:12
12.	"Wasurēnu Kimi e..."	Akio Shimizu; Mariko Okabe	Akio Shimizu	Toshiyuki Mori	4:44
13.	"Ai no Arashi"	Tomoyasu Hotei	Tomoyasu Hotei	Soul Toul; Kaio Tsuruta	3:58
14.	"Minna de Waahhahha!"	Tsunku	Tsunku	Ken Matsubara	3:28
15.	"Ai wa Nude"	Tsunku	Tsunku	Shunsuke Suzuki	5:08
16.	"Koi ni Kidzuita Yoru"	Tsunku	Tsunku	Yuichi Takahashi	4:58
17.	"Oh! It's True Love"	Tsunku	Tsunku	Shunsuke Suzuki	3:03

== Personnel ==
- Shigeru Joshima - guitar
- Tomoya Nagase - lead vocalist, guitar
- Masahiro Matsuoka - drums
- Taichi Kokubun - keyboard
- Tatsuya Yamaguchi - bass
