= My Boss My Hero =

Japanese TV series

- Title card
- マイ☆ボス マイ☆ヒーロー
- Genre: Comedy, romance, yakuza
- Written by: Mika Omori
- Directed by: Toya Sato (佐藤東弥); Noriyoshi Sakuma (佐久間紀佳); Jun Ishio (石尾純)
- Starring: Tomoya Nagase; Yuya Tegoshi; Yui Aragaki; Koki Tanaka; Masaya Kikawada; Yu Kashii
- Theme music composer: Tokio
- Opening theme: "Sorafune"
- Composer: Yu Takami (高見優)
- Country of origin: Japan
- Original language: Japanese
- No. of seasons: 1
- No. of episodes: 10 (List of episodes)

Production
- Producers: Hidehiro Kono (河野英裕); Yoshio Yamamoto (山本由緒); Akihiro Yamauchi (山内章弘); Takeshi Sato (佐藤毅)
- Running time: approx. 45 minutes

Original release
- Network: Nippon Television
- Release: July 8 – September 16, 2006

Related
- My Boss, My Hero; My Boss, My Teacher; The Mafia, The Salesman

My Boss My Hero (マイ★ボス マイ★ヒーロー, Mai Bosu Mai Hīrō) is a Japanese television drama broadcast by Nippon Television (NTV). It is a remake of the South Korean movie My Boss, My Hero. It aired in Japan during the summer of 2006.

== Synopsis ==
The show is about Makio Sakaki (榊 真喜男), also known as "Tornado", a 27-year-old yakuza gangster, who wants to succeed his father as the head of the gang. However, Makio is not very bright, so his father decides to send him back to high school and makes a deal with him: if he can graduate he can become the new leader of the gang. If Makio doesn't graduate, the position of boss will be given to his younger brother, Mikio.

== Cast ==
Actor	Role
Tomoya Nagase	Makio Sakaki (榊 真喜男)
Yuya Tegoshi	Jun Sakurakoiji (桜小路 順)
Yui Aragaki	Hikari Umemura (梅村 ひかり)
Koki Tanaka	Kazuya Manabe (真鍋 和弥)
Masaya Kikawada	Mikio Sakaki (榊 美喜男)
Yu Kashii	Yuriko Minami (南 百合子)
Masachika Ichimura	Kichi Sakaki (榊 喜一)

== Episodes ==
No.	Original title	Translated title
1	「若頭☆高校生になる!」	Young master becomes a student!
2	「若頭☆学級委員長になる!」	Young master becomes a class leader!
3	「若頭☆テストに燃える?!」	The young master sets his eyes on the test?!
4	「夏休みだよ!☆若頭」	It's summer holidays! Young master
5	「グレてやる!☆若頭の反抗期」	I'll be bad! Young master's rebellion
6	「立ち上がれ組長!☆A組の内部抗争」	Stand up class leader! internal conflict of the A class
7	「俺の正体は!☆若頭、涙の疾走」	I am ...! Young master falls in tears
8	「文化祭☆愛と青春のハッピーデイ!」	Cultural festival! Happy day of youth and love!
9	「若頭☆バレンタインデーは大決戦!!」	The young master's decisive battle on Valentine's Day!!
10	「さよなら若頭☆舞い上がれ、俺たちの船」	Bon voyage, young master... Arise, ship!
