= Sorafune / Do! Do! Do! =

2006 single by Tokio

"Sorafune"/"Do! Do! Do!"

Single by Tokio

from the album Harvest
- Released: August 23, 2006
- Genre: J-pop, Rock
- Label: J Storm/Universal

Tokio singles chronology
"Get Your Dream" (2006)	"Sorafune"/"Do! Do! Do!" (2006)	"Hikari no Machi / Run Free (Swan Dance o Kimi to)" (2007)

"Ship in the Air"

Song by Miyuki Nakajima

from the album Lullaby Singer
- Language: Japanese
- Published: Nippon Television Music Corporation / Yamaha Music Foundation / Johnny Company, Inc.
- Released: November 22, 2006
- Genre: J-pop, kayokyoku, pop metal
- Length: 4:19
- Label: Yamaha Music Communications
- Songwriter(s): Miyuki Nakajima
- Producer(s): Ichizo Seo, Miyuki Nakajima

"Sorafune"/"Do! Do! Do!" is a double A-side single by the Japanese boy band Tokio, released on August 23, 2006. It is the thirty-sixth release for the group, and also has been their most commercial successful effort after their 1995 best-selling debut single "Love You Only".

"Sorafune" was composed by Japanese recording artist Miyuki Nakajima, who has also gained success as a songwriter for other interpreters such as Naoko Ken and Shizuka Kudo throughout her three decade spanning career. In July 2006, the song was premiered on the Japanese television drama My Boss My Hero starring the group's primary vocalist Tomoya Nagase. Likewise, "Do! Do! Do!" was featured on commercials for the Xbox 360 that the band appeared in.

Immediately upon its release, the double A-side CD single was greeted with favorable reaction. It debuted at number one on the Japanese Oricon singles chart, having sold over 120,000 copies in first week. The band's fifth chart-topper "Sorafune"/"Do!Do!Do!" achieved enduring commercial success, entering the Oricon for over a year with physical sales in excess of 484,000 copies and becoming their longest charting material to date.

The CD single was certified double platinum by Recording Industry Association of Japan for shipments of over 600,000 units.

"Sorafune" was simultaneously recorded by the composer, and appeared on her studio album Lullaby Singer released in November 2006. Nakajima's version was dubbed English-translated title "Ship in the Air". The song has also been covered by artists such as Shizuka Kudo and Hideaki Horii.

== Track listing ==
"Sorafune"/"Do! Do! Do!" was released in four different versions:

=== CD normal edition ===
No.	Title	Writer(s)	Arranger	Length
1.	"Sorafune (宙船)"	Miyuki Nakajima	Motoki Funayama	4:01
2.	"Do! Do! Do!"	TAKESHI	3-5-2	4:24
3.	"Reply (リプライ, Ripurai)"	Hikari	Kazuhiro Yamahara	4:49
4.	"Sorafune (宙船)" (Backing track)	Nakajima	Funayama	4:01
5.	"Do! Do! Do!" (Backing track)	Takeshi	3-5-2	4:21

=== CD limited press edition ===
No.	Title	Writer(s)	Length
1.	"Sorafune (宙船)"	Nakajima	4:01
2.	"Do! Do! Do!"	TAKESHI	4:24
3.	"Reply" (リプライ Ripurai)	Hikari	4:49
4.	"Sorafune (宙船)" (Acoustic version)	Nakajima
5.	"Sorafune (宙船)" (Backing track)	Nakajima	4:01
6.	"Do! Do! Do!" (Backing track)		4:21

=== CD+DVD version A ===
CD
No.	Title	Writer(s)	Length
1.	"Sorafune (宙船)"	Nakajima	4:01
2.	"Do! Do! Do!"	TAKESHI	4:24

DVD
No.	Title	Length
1.	"Sorafune (宙船)" (music video)
2.	"Sorafune (宙船)" (making clip)

=== CD+DVD version B ===
CD
No.	Title	Writer(s)	Length
1.	"Do! Do! Do!"	TAKESHI	4:24
2.	"Sorafune (宙船)"	Nakajima	4:01

DVD
No.	Title	Notes	Length
1.	"Do! Do! Do!" (music video)	The DVD also includes a Japanese Xbox 360 commercial featuring the song "Sorafune".

== Charts ==
=== Chart positions ===
Chart (2006–07)	Position	Weeks
Japanese Oricon Weekly Singles Chart	1	62

=== Year-end charts ===
Chart (2006)	Position
Japanese Oricon Singles Chart	15
Chart (2007)	Position
Japanese Oricon Singles Chart	85

== Certifications ==
Country	Provider	Title	Certification (sales thresholds)	Format	Date
Japan	RIAJ	"Sorafune"	Million	Chaku-Uta Full	January 2007
Japan	RIAJ	"Sorafune"/"Do! Do! Do!"	2× Platinum	CD single	February 2007
