= Act II (Tokio album) =

Studio album by Tokio
- Released: February 2, 2005
- Genre: Japanese rock/pop
- Length: 1:00:26
- Label: Universal Music

Tokio chronology
TOK10 (2004)	Act II (2005)	Harvest (2006)

Act II is the ninth studio album by Japanese band Tokio. It was released on February 2, 2005. The album reached third place on the Oricon weekly chart and charted for seven weeks.

== Track listing ==
No.	Title	Lyrics	Music	Arrangement	Length
1.	"Cm"	Hikari	Hikari	Hikari and KAM	4:51
2.	"Water Light"	Koutarou Kubota	Koutarou Kubota	Koutarou Kubota and KAM	3:59
3.	"Vale-Tudo"	Shigeru Joshima	Taichi Kokubun	Taichi Kokubun and KAM	4:16
4.	"Ambitious Japan!"	Rei Nakanishi	Kyouhei Tsutsumi	Motoki Funayama	4:01
5.	"For You"	Takeshi	Tord Bäckström and Bengt Girell	Hikari	3:51
6.	"Alive-Life"	Akio Shimizu	Akio Shimizu	Taku Yoshioka	4:25
7.	"Transistor G Girl"	Ken Yokoyama	Ken Yokoyama	Ken Yokoyama	4:02
8.	"Hitsuyou to Omowa Reru Kasho ni Piriodo wo Ute"	Shigeru Joshima	Shigeru Joshima	Shigeru Joshima and Yossy	4:10
9.	"Hummingbird"	Takeshi	Kazuhiro Yamahara	Kazuhiro Yamahara	4:43
10.	"Love Love Manhattan"	Kankurou Kudou	Taku Tomizawa	Taku Tomizawa and KAM	5:25
11.	"Otokotachi no Melody"	Casey Rankin (Shogun)	Casey Rankin (Shogun)	Kazuhiro Yamahara	4:04
12.	"Parking"	KAM	KAM	KAM	3:52
13.	"Jibun no Tameni"	Takashi Iioka	Takashi Iioka	Kazuhiro Yamahara	4:05
14.	"Sunset.Sunrise"	Koutarou Kubota	Koutarou Kubota	Koutarou Kubota	4:47

== Use in popular media ==
- "Ambitious Japan!" was used in the video game Donkey Konga 2: Hit Song Parade.
- "Love Love Manhattan" was used in the Japanese TV series Manhattan Love Story.
- "Ambitious Japan!" is using right now in JR Central Tokaido Shinkansen announcement melody.
