= Wild & Mild =

Studio album by Tokio
- Released: March 26, 1997
- Genre: Japanese Rock/Pop
- Length: 38:18
- Label: Sony Music Entertainment

Tokio chronology
Best E.P Selection of Tokio (1996)	Wild & Mild (1997)	Graffiti (1998)

Wild & Mild is the fourth studio album by Japanese band Tokio. It was released on March 26, 1997. The album reached ninth place on the Oricon weekly chart and charted for four weeks.

== Track listing ==
No.	Title	Lyrics	Music	Arrangement	Length
1.	"Hazy Crazy Love"	Narumi Yamamoto	Y. Makaino	Y. Makaino	4:01
2.	"Rain"	Joe Rinoie	Joe Rinoie	Joe Rinoie; Masaki Suzukawa	4:33
3.	"Stand Me Up!"	Yoshihiko Andou	Y. Makaino	Y. Makaino	3:52
4.	"22 Sai"	Akira Ohtsu	Y. Makaino	Y. Makaino	4:59
5.	"Angel"	Nozomi Inoue	Masaki	Takayuki Hijikata	3:56
6.	"Don't Stop Makin' Love"	Yoshihiko Andou	Y. Makaino	Y. Makaino	4:37
7.	"Yoru wa Buttobase"	Mariko Okabe	Kazuyoshi Baba	Takayuki Hijikata	3:42
8.	"Come On"	Joe Rinoie	Joe Rinoie	Joe Rinoie; Masaki Suzukawa	4:35
9.	"Dash for the Dream! (Wild & Mild Mix)"	Yoshihiko Andou	Y. Makaino	Y. Makaino	4:51
10.	"Yakusoku - In My Arms"	Akira Ohtsu	Y. Makaino	Y. Makaino	4:09
11.	"Furarete Genki (Ride On Live Mix)"	You Waki	Takeshi Kamigori	Norio Inoue	3:41
