= Get Your Dream =

Single by Tokio

from the album Harvest
- Released: June 21, 2006
- Recorded: 2006
- Genre: J-pop; Rock
- Label: Universal Music
- Songwriters: Takeshi, Tsukasa

Tokio singles chronology
"Mr. Traveling Man" (2006)	"Get Your Dream" (2006)	"Sorafune / Do! Do! Do!" (2006)

Audio sample
- file; help

"Get Your Dream" is the thirty-fifth single by the Japanese band Tokio and was released on June 21, 2006. It reached second place on the Oricon charts. The song "Get Your Dream" was used in Japan as the theme song for TBS' coverage of the 2006 FIFA World Cup.

== Track listing ==
"Get Your Dream" was released in three different versions:

=== CD Normal Edition ===
No.	Title	Lyrics	Music	Arrangement	Length
1.	"Get Your Dream"	Takeshi	Tsukasa	Kazz
2.	"Parasitic Plants"	Kodamakkusu	Kodamakkusu	Kam
3.	"Symphonic (Live Version)"	Hikari	Hikari
4.	"Kimi o Omoutoki (Live Version)"	Natsumi Watanabe	Miki Watabe	Shimura and Kaio Tsuruta
5.	"Get Your Dream (Backing Track)"

=== Special Edition A ===
CD
No.	Title	Lyrics	Music	Arrangement	Length
1.	"Get Your Dream"	Takeshi	Tsukasa	Kazz
2.	"Symphonic (Live Version)"	Hikari	Hikari

DVD
No.	Title	Length
1.	"Get Your Dream (Music Video)"
2.	"Get Your Dream (Making Clip)"

=== Special Edition B ===
CD
No.	Title	Lyrics	Music	Arrangement	Length
1.	"Get Your Dream"	Takeshi	Tsukasa	Kazz
2.	"Kimi o Omoutoki (Live Version)"	Natsumi Watanabe	Miki Watabe	Shimura and Kaio Tsuruta
3.	"Get Your Dream (Backing Track)"

DVD
No.	Title	Length
1.	"Get Your Dream (Recording clip)"
