= Heaven's Door (2009 film) =

- Film poster
- Directed by: Michael Arias
- Screenplay by: Mika Omori
- Story by: Thomas Jahn
- Starring: Tomoya Nagase; Mayuko Fukuda
- Music by: Plaid
- Distributed by: Asmik Ace
- Release date: February 7, 2009
- Running time: 106 minutes
- Country: Japan
- Language: Japanese

Heaven's Door (ヘブンズ・ドア) is a 2009 Japanese drama film starring Tomoya Nagase and Mayuko Fukuda. The film is a remake of the 1997 German criminal comedy Knockin' on Heaven's Door.

== Premise ==
A recently fired mechanic named Masato Aoyama discovers that he has an inoperable brain tumor. While in the hospital, he meets a teenage girl named Harumi Shiraishi who is dying from cancer. When he learns that she has never seen the ocean, Masato decides to take her on one final adventure with her. Unfortunately, the two steal a car belonging to a gangster.

== Cast ==
- Tomoya Nagase as Masato Aoyama
- Mayuko Fukuda as Harumi Shiraishi
- Keishi Nagatsuka as Kokubo
- Kôji Ohkura as Adachi
- Sôkô Wada as Mikoshiba
- Masaya Kikawada as Kishitani
- Min Tanaka as Henmi
- Tomokazu Miura as Hasegawa
