= Tokio Remix =

Remix album by Tokio
- Released: March 8, 1995
- Genre: Rock, Pop
- Length: 44:02
- Label: Sony Music Entertainment

Tokio chronology
Tokio (1994)	Tokio Remix (1995)	Bad Boys Bound (1995)

Tokio Remix is the first remix album by Japanese band Tokio. It was released on March 8, 1995. The album reached ninth place on the Oricon weekly chart and charted for five weeks.

== Track listing ==
No.	Title	Lyrics	Music	Arrangement	Length
1.	"Tokio wo Yoroshiku! -Jungle Mix-"	Shigeru Joshima and Hiroshi Yamada	Tatsuya Nishiwaki	Tatsuya Nishiwaki	5:19
2.	"Love You Only -Happy Techno Mix-"	Tetsuo Kudou	Takashi Tsushimi	Tatsuya Nishiwaki	6:01
3.	"Ashita no Kimi wo Mamoritai -Yamato 2520~Straight Mix-"	Tetsuo Kudou	Takashi Tsushimi	Ryoumei Shirai	4:28
4.	"Love You Only -Straight Mix-"	Tetsuo Kudou	Takashi Tsushimi	Tatsuya Nishiwaki	3:55
5.	"Koi no Calcular Machine -All Mack Club Mix-"	Rolly Teranishi	Rolly Teranishi	Ryoumei Shirai	5:39
6.	"Cherie Amour -Blaze Radio Mix-"	Sora Hibino	Hideki Aoki	Ryoumei Shirai	4:03
7.	"Love You Only -Damien's USA Mix-"	Tetsuo Kudou	Takashi Tsushimi	Tatsuya Nishiwaki	9:11
8.	"Cherie Amour -Hip Hop Remix-"	Sora Hibino	Hideki Aoki	Ryoumei Shirai	4:36
9.	"Ashita no Kimi wo Mamoritai -Yamato 2520 / Hip Hop Remix-"	Tetsuo Kudou	Takashi Tsushimi	Ryoumei Shirai	4:38
