= Graffiti (Tokio album) =

Studio album by Tokio
- Released: April 1, 1998
- Genre: J-rock
- Length: 38:18
- Label: Sony Music Entertainment

Tokio chronology
Wild & Mild (1997)	Graffiti (1998)	Yesterday & Today (2000)

Graffiti is the fifth studio album by Japanese band Tokio. It was released on April 1, 1998. The album reached ninth place on the Oricon weekly chart and charted for three weeks.

== Track listing ==
No.	Title	Lyrics	Music	Arrangement	Length
1.	"I to You ki To"	Ryouichi Higuchi	Ryouichi Higuchi	Toshiyuki Mori	5:08
2.	"Yakusoku no Basho -Believe-"	Ryouichi Higuchi and Tatsuya Yamaguchi	Ryouichi Higuchi and Tatsuya Yamaguchi	Ryutayo Shimura	4:49
3.	"Purple Rouge"	Masahiro Matsuoka	Masahiro Matsuoka	Tohru Sohru	5:13
4.	"Orange Iro no Taiyo"	Shigeru Joshima	Shigeru Joshima	Toshiyuki Mori	4:48
5.	"Bad Named Song"	Tomoya Nagase	Tomoya Nagase	Tomoya Nagase and Kazuyoshi Baba	5:07
6.	"Ibushi Gin"	Taichi Kokubun	Taichi Kokubun, Jumbo	Taichi Kokubun, (Washi)	4:34
7.	"Lesson"	Jun Someya	Stevie Salas	Stevie Salas	3:34
8.	"Aitasa wa Tsunoru Dake"	Hanako Ishikawa	Masayoshi Yamazaki	Toshiyuki Mori	4:59
9.	"Crazy Chase"	Hideki	Hideki	Hiroyuki Nanba	4:15
10.	"Ashita wa Ashita no Kaze ga Fuku"	Mariko Okabe	Anders Hellgren, Peter Karlsson, and David Myhr	Ryutayo Shimura	3:30
11.	"Julia (Album Version)"	Joe Rinoie	Joe Rinoie	Ryou Yonemitsu	6:02
