= Glider (Tokio album) =

Studio album by Tokio
- Released: February 19, 2003
- Genre: Japanese rock/pop
- Length: 63.25 minutes
- Label: Universal Music

Tokio chronology
5 Ahead (2001)	Glider (2003)	TOK10 (2004)

Glider is the eighth studio album by Japanese band Tokio. It was released on February 19, 2003. The album reached fifth place on the Oricon weekly chart and charted for six weeks.

== Track listing ==
No.	Title	Lyrics	Music	Arrangement	Length
1.	"Hum a Tune"	Koutarou Kubota	Koutarou Kubota	Koutarou Kubota	4:37
2.	"Concrete Japanese Sunday"	Koutarou Kubota	Koutarou Kubota	Koutarou Kubota	4:47
3.	"Hana Uta"	Takeshi	Akinori Suzuki	Masanori Shimada	4:34
4.	"Live My Life!"	Tatsuya Yamaguchi	Taichi Kokubun	Taichi Kokubun and Butcha K	4:14
5.	"Faith"	Toshinori Yonekura	Toshinori Yonekura	Hitoshi Munakata	6:00
6.	"Booster"	Takeshi	Kazuhiro Yamahara	Kazuhiro Yamahara	3:54
7.	"Green"	Hikari	Hikari	Hikari	5:59
8.	"Midnight Rose"	Shigeru Joshima	Shigeru Joshima	Masahiro Matsuoka and Taku Yoshioka	5:04
9.	"I'm Mine"	Tomoya Nagase	Taichi Kokubun	Taichi Kokubun and KAM	5:05
10.	"Scream"	Tomoya Nagase	Tomoya Nagase	Tomoya Nagase and Koutarou Kubota	4:49
11.	"Glider (Album version)"	Hikari	Hikari	Hikari	5:04
12.	"Phonograph"	Hikari	Hikari	Hikari	5:14
13.	"Ding-Dong"	Bargains	Bargains	KAM	4:02
