= Sugar (Tokio album) =

Studio album by Tokio
- Released: February 20, 2008
- Genre: Japanese Rock/Pop
- Length: 33:13
- Label: Universal Music

Tokio chronology
Harvest (2006)	Sugar (2008)	17 (2012)

Professional ratings
Review scores
Source	Rating
Allmusic	3/5 stars

Sugar is the eleventh studio album by Japanese band Tokio. It was released on February 20, 2008. The album peaked at sixth place on the Oricon weekly charts and charted for six weeks.

== Track listing ==
No.	Title	Lyrics	Music	Arrangement	Length
1.	"Sugar"	Tomoya Nagase	Tomoya Nagase	Tokio	6:07
2.	"Overdrive"	Hirou Ohyagi	Hirou Ohyagi	Kazuhiro Yamahara	3:48
3.	"Seishun"	Tsuyoshi Nagabuchi	Tsuyoshi Nagabuchi	Motoki Funayama	5:00
4.	"Hikari no Machi"	Yoshihiro Kai	Yoshihiro Kai	Tomohiko Nishimura	4:25
5.	"Koibito mo Nureru Machikado" (恋人も濡れる街角)	Keisuke Kuwata	Keisuke Kuwata	Tokio	4:21
6.	"Honjitsu, Mijukumono" (本日、未熟者)	Miyuki Nakajima	Miyuki Nakajima	Motoki Funayama	4:58
7.	"Run Free (Swan Dance wo Kimi to)" (ラン・フリー(スワン・ダンスを君と))	Yoshihiro Kai	Yoshihiro Kai	Tomohiko Nishimura	4:35

Disc 2 (Limited edition)
No.	Title	Arrangement	Length
1.	"Seishun ~Kandō~" (Instrumental)	Kan Sawada
2.	"Seishun ~Action~" (Instrumental)	Motoki Funayama, Kan Sawada
3.	"Seishun ~Setsunai~" (Instrumental)	Kan Sawada
4.	"Sorafune ~Jumble Version~" (Instrumental)	Motoki Funayama, KAM
5.	"Honjitsu, Mijukumono ~Unplugged~" (Instrumental)	Kan Sawada
