= TOK10 =

Studio album by Tokio
- Released: September 1, 2004
- Genre: Rock/pop
- Length: 1:03:53
- Label: Universal

Tokio chronology
Glider (2003)	TOK10 (2004)	Act II (2005)

TOK10 (pronounced トキオ "Tokio") is a covers album by Japanese band Tokio, released on September 1, 2004. It was released to commemorate the tenth anniversary of the band's debut. The album peaked at number one on the Oricon weekly chart and charted for twelve weeks. To date, it is their only album to top the Oricon charts.

== Track listing ==
1. "Namida-kun Sayonara" - 4:07 (originally by Johnny Tillotson, 1966)
2. "Bulldog" - 4:16 (originally by Four Leaves, 1977)
3. "Yoroshiku Aishuu" - 3:19 (originally by Hiromi Gō, 1974)
4. "Dakishimete Tonight" - 4:04 (originally by Toshihiko Tahara, 1988)
5. "Gin Giragira ni Sarige naku" - 4:47 (originally by Masahiko Kondō, 1981)
6. "100%... So Kamone!" - 5:04 (originally by Shibugakitai, 1982)
7. "Kimagure One Way Boy" - 4:44 (originally by the Good-Bye, 1983)
8. "Kimi Dake ni" - 4:32 (originally by Shonentai, 1987)
9. "Daybreak" - 4:41 (originally by Otokogumi, 1988)
10. "Paradise Ginga" - 4:27 (originally by Hikaru Genji, 1988)
11. "Lion Heart" - 4:15 (originally by SMAP, 2000)
12. "Flower" - 5:32 (originally by KinKi Kids, 1999)
13. "Wa ni Natte Odorou" - 5:27 (originally by Agharta, May 1997; covered by V6, July 1997)
14. "Love You Only" (remix) - 4:46
