= 5 Ahead =

Studio album by Tokio
- Released: December 5, 2001
- Genre: Japanese Rock/Pop
- Length: 1:17:01
- Label: Universal Music

Tokio chronology
Best EP Selection of Tokio II (2001)	5 Ahead (2001)	Glider (2003)

5 Ahead is the seventh studio album by Japanese band Tokio. It was released on December 5, 2001. It was the first album to be released under Universal Music Japan. The album reached eighth place on the Oricon weekly chart and charted for six weeks.

The name of the album is a pun: 5 in Japanese is pronounced Go; thus, the real name of the album is GO AHEAD.

== Track listing ==
=== Disc 1 ===
No.	Title	Lyrics	Music	Arrangement	Length
1.	"5 Ahead"	—	—	—	0:30
2.	"Hey! Mr Sampling Man"	Koutarou Kubota	Koutarou Kubota	Koutarou Kubota	4:21
3.	"DR."	Koutarou Kubota	Koutarou Kubota	Koutarou Kubota and KAM	4:08
4.	"Doitsumo Koitsumo (Album Version)"	Jun Abe	Jun Abe	KaaTo	4:30
5.	"Baby Blue"	Shigeru Joshima	Shigeru Joshima	Taku Yoshioka	4:57
6.	"04515"	Hikari	Hikari	Hikari	4:09
7.	"Only One Song"	Twune	Twune	Kanichirou Kubo	4:18
8.	"Kanpai!!"	Masato Ochi, Bill Martin、and Philip Coulter	Kenichi Ase, Bill Martin、and Philip Coulter	Motoki Funayama and Tatsuo Nagami	3:34
9.	"Sugarless Love"	Masato Ochi	Akio Shimizu	Tomoki Ishitzuka	3:44
10.	"T2"	Taichi Kokubun	Taichi Kokubun	Taichi Kokubun and KAM	3:28
11.	"36°C (Original Words and Music by John Peppard and Marwenna Diame)"	Shigeru Joshima	Shigeru Joshima	Yoshihiko Chino	3:44
12.	"Message"	Koutarou Kubota	Koutarou Kubota	KAM	4:43
13.	"Symphonic"	Hikari	Hikari	KAM	5:46
14.	"Hitoribocchi no Haburashi (Acoustic Version)"	Tsunku	Tsunku	Yuichi Takahashi	4:46

=== Disc 2 ===
No.	Title	Lyrics	Music	Arrangement	Length
1.	"Opening ~Talk 1"	—	—	—	5:30
2.	"The Future Is Chance of Infinity"	Yasuhiro Satou	Yasuhiro Satou	Yasuhiro Satou and KAM	1:34
3.	"Talk 2"	—	—	—	8:54
4.	"Yesterday's (Acoustic Version)"	Akio Shimizu	Akio Shimizu	KAM	4:34

== Personnel ==
- Shigeru Joshima – guitar
- Tomoya Nagase – lead vocalist, guitar
- Masahiro Matsuoka – drums
- Taichi Kokubun – keyboard
- Tatsuya Yamaguchi – bass
