= Love You Only =

Single by Tokio

from the album Tokio
- Released: September 21, 1994
- Recorded: 1994
- Genre: J-pop
- Label: Sony Music Entertainment
- Songwriters: Tetsuo Kudou, Takashi Tsushimi

Tokio singles chronology
| "Love You Only" (1994) | "Ashita no Kimi o Mamoritai: Yamato2520" (1994) |

"Love You Only" is the debut single by the Japanese band Tokio and was released on September 21, 1994. It reached third place on the Oricon weekly charts, and charted for 22 weeks. It was also the 3rd opening theme song to the anime Tsuyoshi Shikkari Shinasai. In addition to being included in the album Tokio, it was remixed for the album TOK10.

== Track listing ==
CD
| No. | Title | Lyrics | Music | Arrangement | Length |
|---|---|---|---|---|---|
| 1. | "Love You Only" | Tetsuo Kudou | Takashi Tsushimi | Tatsuya Nishiwaki | 3:56 |
| 2. | "Jidai (Tokio) o Yoroshiku!" | Shigeru Joshima and Hiroshi Yamada | Tatsuya Nishiwaki | Tatsuya Nishiwaki | 3:58 |
| 3. | "Love You Only (Backing Track)" |
