= Tatsuya Yamaguchi (actor) =

Japanese singer, TV presenter (born 1972)

Tatsuya Yamaguchi 山口達也
- Born: 10 January 1972 (age 54); Soka, Saitama, Japan
- Occupations: Singer; bassist; actor; television presenter
- Instrument: Bass
- Years active: 1989–2018
- Labels: Universal Music Japan; J Storm; Sony Music Entertainment
- Formerly of: Tokio

Tatsuya Yamaguchi (山口 達也, Yamaguchi Tatsuya; born 10 January 1972) is a Japanese former singer, television presenter, and bassist for the Johnny & Associates group Tokio.

== Career ==
He has acted in several movies and television shows as well as being a co-star for Tokio's variety shows Tokio Kakeru and The Tetsuwan Dash.

On 25 April 2018, news broke that Yamaguchi had been referred to prosecutors for allegedly kissing a girl against her will at his home in Minato, Tokyo, in February 2018. At a hastily arranged news conference at a hotel in Tokyo on 26 April, Yamaguchi apologized for kissing and engaging in indecent behavior with a high school-aged girl. A lawyer representing Johnny & Associates, the talent agency that manages Tokio, announced that Yamaguchi would be indefinitely suspended from activities.

On 6 May 2018, Johnny & Associates announced that they had terminated their contract with Yamaguchi.

== Personal life ==
Yamaguchi married a former model in March 2008. On 5 August 2016, he announced that they had divorced.

On September 22, 2020, he was arrested on suspicion of drunk driving after rear ending a car in front of his motorcycle.

== Filmography ==
Film

- That's Cunning! Shijō Saidai no Sakusen? (1996), as Kimura Kenji
- Kung Fu Panda (2008), as Po (Japanese version)
- Kung Fu Panda: Secrets of the Furious Five (2008), as Po (voice)
- Kung Fu Panda 2 (2011), as Po (Japanese version)

Television

- Wataru Seken wa Oni Bakari (1993), guest appearance
- Ten (2003), presenter
- Būke o Nerae! (2002–2003), presenter
- Ue o Muite Arukō: Sakamoto Kyu Monogatari (2005), as Kyu Sakamoto
- Onee Mans (2006–2009), presenter
- Majo-tachi no 22-ji (2009–2011), presenter
- R no Hōsoku (2011–2018), presenter
- Zip! (2011–2018), Monday, Wednesday main personality
- Shiawase! Bonbi Girl (2011–2018), presenter
