= Tokio (band) =

Japanese rock/pop band

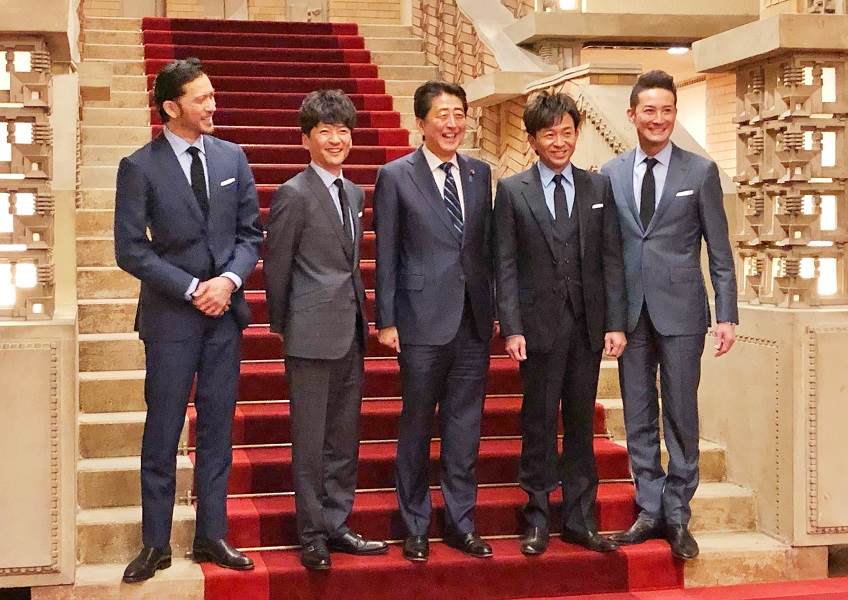
- Tokio with the then Japanese Prime Minister Shinzō Abe.

Background information
- Origin: Japan
- Genres: Power pop; pop rock
- Years active: 1989-2025
- Labels: Sony Music Entertainment; Universal Music Japan; J Storm
- Past members: Shigeru Joshima; Taichi Kokubun; Masahiro Matsuoka; Hiromu Kojima; Tatsuya Yamaguchi; Tomoya Nagase
- Website: www.j-storm.co.jp/tokio

Tokio was a Japanese rock/pop band formed by Johnny & Associates that formed in 1989 and debuted in 1994. Originally signed with Sony Music Entertainment from 1994 to 2001, with Universal Music Japan from 2001 to 2008, and, from then until the end, signed under J Storm (later called "Storm Labels"). In addition to their activities as a band, the members of Tokio also acted in dozens of dramas and hosted variety programmes, both as a group and individually.

The group's name, "Tokio", is the old English romanization for Japan's capital Tokyo, and remains the current transliteration in several European languages. Unlike most other bands under Johnny & Associates, where all of the band members are usually only vocalists, Tokio had one main vocalist, a drummer, a guitarist, a bassist, and a keyboardist. Subsequently, less choreography was used in concerts and promotional videos, and their music is often more rock-centric.

Since their debut in 1994, they have sold about 9 million copies.

Bassist Tatsuya Yamaguchi was dropped from the band in May 2018, following a sexual harassment scandal involving a high-school-aged girl.

Nagase left the band in July 2020 to pursue his own endeavors.

The group announced their disbandment on June 25, 2025, following the report of Kokubun's violation of compliance.

== History ==
=== 1989–1993: Formation ===
Like the members of SMAP, the members of Tokio performed as background dancers for the idol group Hikaru Genji mainly in the form of the back-dancing group Heikeha, which also involved members of the band V6. In 1989, guitarist Shigeru Joshima and bassist Tatsuya Yamaguchi discovered they both played instruments in their own bands and decided to form their own, practicing in private and unknown to the company, calling themselves Joshima Band, or "Joh Band" for short. At one point, they also called themselves 'JURIA', combining their names using Joshima's "J", "URI" from the melon-shape of Yamaguchi's face, and rhythm-guitarist member Takehito Asakura's "A". Eventually, Johnny accepted them as a band, giving them the name "Tokio Band". At this point, members included Joshima, Yamaguchi, and new support member, rhythm guitarist Kazuhisa Watanabe.

In 1990, the original Tokio was formed when Joshima was put together with drummer Masahiro Matsuoka and keyboardist Taichi Kokubun, both of whom had also joined Joshima and Yamaguchi in a few of their practices in the past. Rhythm guitarist and vocalist Hiromu Kojima joined the group soon after this. During this time, Joshima underwent negotiations with Johnny Kitagawa himself into allowing Yamaguchi to join the band, and soon he became an official member as well. Tomoya Nagase, another Junior vocalist who had been making more and more headlines, began appearing with the newly formed Tokio on occasion as a support member, which created a bit of odd tension as the group appeared in magazines and on the radio with five members, but on TV and live performances with six members. One of their first live tours included one with the band SAY・S and included all six members.

=== 1994–1999: Debut and onward ===
In 1994, just before the release of the band's debut single, "Love You Only", founding member Hiromu Kojima was succeeded by Nagase following Kojima's departure. Their debut single was released on September 21, 1994. Two months later, on November 21, 1994, their debut and self-titled album, Tokio was released. Their very first performance after their debut was held on New Year's Eve at the 1994 NHK Kouhakutagassen.

Soon after the release of Tokio, the band's first remix album was released in 1995, titled Tokio Remix. In 1996, the band recorded the song "7 O'Clock News" to be used as the theme song for the anime version of Kodocha. Due to licensing issues however, the song was not used as the theme song for the North American release of the series. Also in 1996, the band's first compilation album was released, titled Best E.P Selection of Tokio.

Throughout the rest of the decade, Tokio released 18 more singles and four more studio albums: Bad Boys Bound, Blowing, Wild & Mild, and Graffiti. From 1997 and onwards, some of the band's singles were used as theme songs in television shows, usually drama shows. In 1997, "Furarete Genki" was used as the theme song to Psychometrer Eiji a drama Matsuoka starred in, and "Julia" was used as the theme song for Seiji No Mikata, a drama that starred Taichi Kokubun. In 1999, "Love & Peace" was used as the theme song to Love and Peace, another drama that Matsuoka starred in, and "Ai no Arashi" was used as the theme song for Psychometrer Eiji 2.

=== 2000–2004: Rise in popularity ===
In early 2000, Tokio released the album Yesterday & Today. Following the release of the single "Doitsu Mo Koitsu Mo" in early 2001, Tokio switch recording labels from Sony Music Entertainment to UMG. From the following single, "Oh!Heaven" was the theme song for Tengoku ni Ichiban Chikai Otoko, a drama that starred Matsuoka, and "Hitoribotchino haburashi" was the theme song for Mukodono!, a drama starring Tomoya Nagase. From then on, the majority of subsequently released singles would be used as theme songs for dramas starring members of Tokio. In December 2001, the first album under Universal Music, 5 Ahead, was released.

In May 2001, Tokio released their second compilation album, titled Best EP Selection of Tokio II. Since the release of the single "Ding Dong / Glider" in late 2002, the promotional videos for Tokio songs are directed by Masahiro Matsuoka. 2003 saw the release of the seventh studio album, Glider in February. In 2003, "Ambitious Japan!" was used as the theme song for JR Central's Nozomi train services on the Tōkaidō & San'yō Shinkansen lines.

In 2004, Taichi Kokubun took a leave from Tokio to form the temporary music unit Toraji Haiji with KinKi Kids member Tsuyoshi Domoto. Together they recorded the theme song for the movie Fantastipo, in which they starred in. To commemorate the tenth anniversary of their debut, Tokio released their first cover album, TOK10 in September 2004. It became the band's first number-one album.

=== 2005–2017: Established band ===
Tokio "Get Your Dream" (2006)
Tokio's single "Get Your Dream" was used as the theme song for TBS' coverage of the 2006 FIFA World Cup.

In February 2005, the tenth full-length album (not including compilation albums), Act II was released. They released the single "Ashita o Mezashite!" on December 7, 2005. Tomoya Nagase composed and co-arranged the single with his lyrics, making it their first single composed by a member of the group. In 2005, Tokio was selected to be the host for the Johnny's Countdown 2005-2006 concert, a yearly event that counts down to the New Year. In 2006, Tokio released the single "Sorafune", which sold over 400,000 copies and charted for over four months, making it their most successful single. The Tokio single "Get Your Dream" was used as the theme song in Japan for the 2006 FIFA World Cup. Later in 2006, the group released their longest studio album to date, Harvest, containing seventeen tracks and two remix tracks.

In 2008, Tokio's shortest album was released, titled Sugar. The seven-track album contains the three singles released in 2007. Also in 2008, the band changed recording labels for the second time, switching to J Storm, a label owned by Johnny & Associates. Subsequently, all albums, singles, and other releases previously released under Universal Music were re-released on June 24, 2009.

Their first release under the new label was the four-track single "Amagasa/Akireru Kurai Bokura wa Negaō" on September 3, 2008. "Amagasa" was composed by Ringo Shiina with her lyrics and was arranged by Tokyo Jihen. Tokio released another four-track single titled "Taiyō to Sabaku no Bara/Subeki Koto" on August 19, 2009. After releasing the single "Advance/Mata Asa ga Kuru" on February 3, 2010, they released the single "Haruka" on June 16, 2010. "Haruka" went on to become their first number-one since December 2007. On 11 August 2010, they released the single "NaNaNa (Taiyo Nante Irane)", written by Kōji Tamaki and arranged by Anzen Chitai. Next they released the single "Miageta Ryūsei", which was used as the theme song for Kōkōsei Restaurant, a drama starring Matsuoka. Ahead of the Plus tour, which ran from March to May 2011, Tokio released their first digital single, "Plus", on dwango.jp for a limited time.

On 22 August 2012, Tokio released their twelfth studio album titled 17, their first full-length album in six years. To support the album, the band embarked on the 1718 tour, which ran until September. Tokio's third compilation album, Heart, was released in July 2014. It included two new songs, "Heart" and "Kokoro", written by Nagase and Joshima. Heart went on to become the band's second number-one album. Tokio's final single, "Kumo", was released on 30 August 2017.

=== 2018–2025: Music hiatus ===
On 25 April 2018, news broke that Yamaguchi had been referred to prosecutors for allegedly kissing a girl against her will at his home in February 2018. On 6 May 2018, Johnny & Associates announced that they had terminated their contract with Yamaguchi. As a result of the scandal, Tokio indefinitely suspended all music activities.

In July 2020, Nagase announced that he was to leave the band to pursue his own endeavors. On 31 March 2021, he withdrew from Tokio and retired from the entertainment industry.

On 1 April 2021, the 3 remaining members established a new company called Tokio Co., Ltd., an affiliate to Johnny & Associates. Joshima was made the president of the company, while Kokubun and Matsuoka became the vice presidents. On 2 October 2023, it was informed that Joshima would become plenipotentiary president and CEO of the company, taking over the role held by Julie K. Fujishima. This was informed in the company's official site. Kokubun and Matsuoka remain as vice-presidents.

=== 2025: Disbandment ===
Tokio announced the group's disbandment on June 25, 2025. In a statement on their website, the group apologized for Taichi Kokubun's violation of compliance, acknowledging the significant distress caused to everyone involved. They expressed deep regret and offered their sincerest apologies. The statement further explained that after internal discussions, the members concluded that continuing as TOKIO and regaining public trust was no longer feasible, leading to their decision to disband. They mentioned the fans and all people involved since their debut, thankful for the support since then; and, also, to the people of Fukushima and other areas, with whom they have been working, their gratitude and apologized for the sudden announcement. As for the future, they are considering individual ways in how to give back to those who have supported them until the end.

On July 2, it was reported that the Fukushima outdoor field project, opened as "Tokio Ba" in 2022, headed by Kokubun, would close due to Tokio Co., Ltd. closing its doors, and following the completion of all Tokio Ba Co., Ltd administrative duties regarding the business.

In December, Matsuoka gave an interview to Weekly Shincho regarding Kokubun, Nippon Television and "Tetsuwan Dash", and the future of Jojima, Kokubun and himself. Regarding Kokubun, he said that he has remotely called him, but that he also had him over at his place. Regarding NTV and Dash, he said that neither him nor Jojima had received any explanation from NTV (not counting the total lack of communication and explanation from NTV to Kokubun). Regarding the program, Matsuoka reflected on all the activities done on the show, some of which were done at the beginning, could be considered aggressive and even harmful by today's standards. Matsuoka mentioned the relationship with the network and all the people involved (sponsors, staff, and their juniors) that have been with them for close to 30 years. They are considering all that regarding continuing or not with the program. As for their future, Matsuoka mentioned that he would soon be 49, and Jojima, 55. STARTO asked them to stay, but they decided that in order to take on new challenges and broaden possibilities, they have considered to go independent. Regarding Kokubun's future, it is still undecided, but, Matsuoka mentioned that he (Matsuoka) opened a YouTube channel, and that he hoped that Kokubun would appear on it, or maybe be invited to Kokubun's if he ever opened one.

== Band members ==
Final lineup

- Shigeru Joshima (城島 茂, Jōshima Shigeru) – vocals, guitars, leader (1989–2025)
- Masahiro Matsuoka (松岡 昌宏, Matsuoka Masahiro) – drums, percussion, vocals (1990–2025)
- Taichi Kokubun (国分 太一, Kokubun Taichi) – keyboards, piano, vocals (1990–2025)

Former members

- Tatsuya Yamaguchi (山口 達也, Yamaguchi Tatsuya) – bass guitar, vocals (1989–2018)
- Hiromu Kojima (小島 啓, Kojima Hiromu) – lead vocals, guitars (1990–1994)
- Tomoya Nagase (長瀬 智也, Nagase Tomoya) – lead vocals, guitars, tambourine, saxophone, harmonica (1994–2021)

== Discography ==
Studio albums

- Tokio (1994)
- Bad Boys Bound (1995)
- Blowing (1996)
- Wild & Mild (1997)
- Graffiti (1998)
- Yesterday & Today (2000)
- 5 Ahead (2001)
- Glider (2003)
- Act II (2005)
- Harvest (2006)
- Sugar (2008)
- 17 (2012)

Compilation albums

- Best E.P Selection of Tokio (1996)
- Best EP Selection of Tokio II (2004)
- Heart (2014)

== Appearances ==
=== Variety ===
Tokio has hosted variety programs such as TOKIO Kakeru (TOKIOカケル) (October 2012-September 2023), Mentore G (メントレG) (1999–2008) 5LDK (2008–2012), TokiTabi (トキタビ) (which replaced Kakeru in October 2023, and ended its run due to the network's spring schedule reorganization, as reported on March 4, 2024), and Tetsuwan Dash (ザ!鉄腕!DASH!!, Za! Tetsuwan !Dash!!). On June 20, 2025, on a press conference offered by Nippon Television's President Hiroyuki Fukuda, it was announced that Kokubun would step down his hosting duties on Dash due to "multiple compliance-related incidents in the past" not crime related, without explaining the details, because of privacy protection. Kokubun himself accepted the decision taken by the broadcaster, and apologized for the trouble caused. It was also informed that he would take an indefinite leave of absence. Compliance officers of the broadcaster have revealed that the case is about sexual harassment. Other stations are considering removing Kokubun from their programs. Some sponsors, such as Japanet Holdings, have started removing ads on which he appears.

Below is a list of individual performances:

- Brain Power Expedition Quiz! Homunculus (脳力探険クイズ! ホムクル, Nouryoku Tanken Kuizu! Homukuru) – Taichi Kokubun (with regular guest Shigeru Joshima)
- Love Apron (愛のエプロン, Ai no Apron) – Shigeru Joshima
- Leaders's How To Book (リーダー'S ハウ トゥ Book, Riidaa's Hau Tu Book) – Shigeru Joshima
- OneeMANS (おネエMANS) – Tatsuya Yamaguchi
- R30 – Taichi Kokubun
- The Shounen Club Premium (ザ少年倶楽部プレミアム, Za Shounen Gakubu Puremiamu) – Taichi Kokubun
- Kaitai-Shin Show (解体新ショー, Kaitai Shin Shō) – Taichi Kokubun
- Aura no Izumi (オーラの泉) – Taichi Kokubun
- Ninkimono de Ikou! (人気者でいこう！) – Shigeru Joshima

=== Commercials ===
As of November 2013, Tokio is involved in a nationwide advertising campaign promoting rice from Fukushima Prefecture.
