= Shigeru Joshima =

Japanese musician and actor (born 1970)

Shigeru Joshima 城島 茂
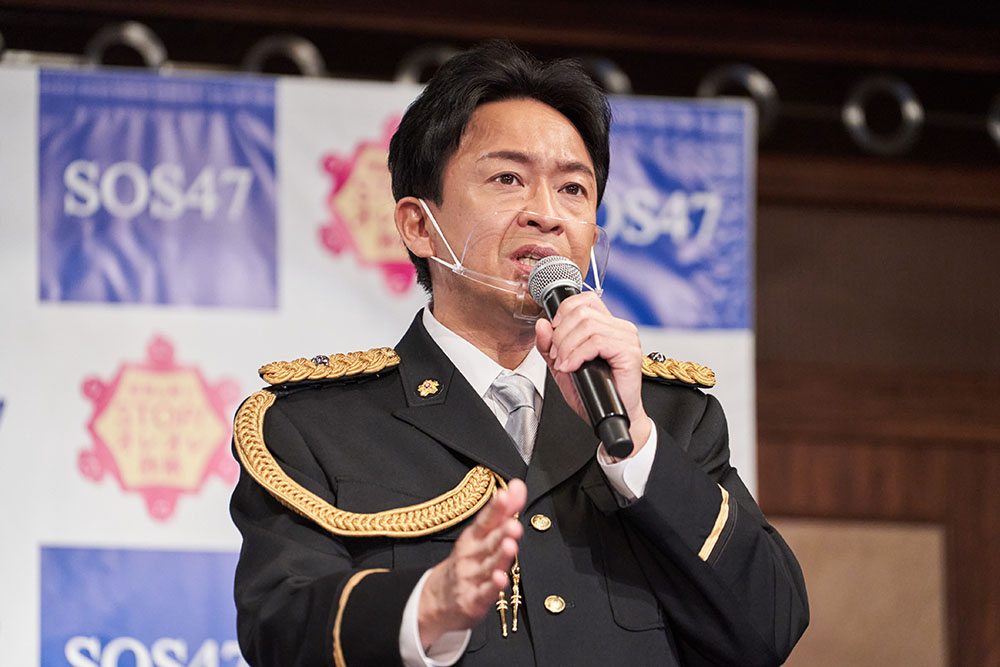

Background information
- Born: November 17, 1970 (age 55)
- Origin: Yamatokōriyama, Nara, Japan
- Genre: Rock
- Occupations: Guitarist; actor
- Instrument: Guitar
- Years active: 1986–present
- Labels: Sony Music Entertainment; Universal Music Japan; Storm Labels
- Formerly of: Tokio
- Website: https://joshima-farm.tokyo/

Shigeru Joshima (城島 茂, Jōshima Shigeru; born November 17, 1970) is a Japanese musician, actor and agricultural entrepreneur. He was the leader and main guitarist of Tokio, a musical group of Starto Entertainment, formerly from Johnny & Associates, until its disbandment in 2025.

== Career ==
=== Musical career ===
Prior to debuting with Tokio, Joshima was a backup-dancer for various Johnny's Entertainment boy bands at the time. He also formed temporary music units during that time, such as Tokio's predecessor, Tokio Band, or the Joshima Band with other to-be Tokio members. In 1990 he became the leader and guitarist of Tokio, but it wasn't until 1994 that the band debuted.

Joshima, Masahiro Matsuoka and Taichi Kokubun, the remaining members of Tokio, after Tatsuya Yamaguchi's contract termination because of a scandal and subsequent suspension of musical activities of the group in 2018, and Tomoya Nagase's decision to retire in 2020, decided to disband after a report of Kokubun's violation of compliance by Nippon TV, which resulted in his suspension of activities.

Joshima announced in January 2026 his intention of continuing with his entertainment career.

=== Acting career ===
Joshima has had parts in various dramas since 1989. One of his first roles ever was as a supporting cast member in the show Gomendou Kakemasu, where he acted alongside Kazuya Takahashi of Otokogumi and Naoto Endou of former Johnny's band Ninja. He has also hosted Ai no Apron and Leader's How-To Book, Brain Power Expedition Quiz! Homunculus with fellow member Kokubun, and with other Tokio members, hosted Gachinko!, The Tetsuwan Dash, Mentore G, and 5LDK.

=== Other ===
==== Joshima Farm ====
On January 5, 2026, Joshima Farm, a business represented by Joshima, launched its official website and SNS. Content of the site includes Joshima's entertainment activities, and information about his intentions to provide lectures, community support, education, social cooperation, and e-commerce business, related to agriculture and other themes.

== Filmography ==
=== Television ===
Year/s	Title	Role	Notes	Ref.
1997	DxD: Dangerous Angel x Death Hunter		Guest appearance (episode 4)	
1997	Hagure Keiji Junjoha		Seasons 10 and 11 (1997–1998)	
1999	Makasete Darling			
1999	Tenshi no Oshigoto			
1999	Shin Oretachi no Tabi			
2002	Engimono	Dr. Hirune	Black Handkerchief series part one	
2003	Manhattan Love Story		Guest appearance (episode 1)	
2004	Gekidan Engimono		Automatic series	
2006	Imo Tako Nankin	Tokiuchi Hanaoka		
2007	Yonimo Kimyou na Monogatari 2007 Fall Special	Hamaguchi Naoki	Vending Machine Man (自販機男, Jihanki Otoko) segment	
2009	Ketsuekigatabetsu Onna ga Kekkon Suru Hoho	Hitoshi Gondawara	Episode 4	
2009	0 Goshitsu no Kyaku		"First Story", "Third Story", "Fifth Story", "Last Story"	

=== Streaming ===
Year/s	Title	Role	Notes	Ref.
2017	Blazing Transfer Students	Himself	Guest appearance (final episode)	

== Radio ==
- Tokio Club (TBS Radio)
