= Masahiro Matsuoka =

Japanese drummer and actor (born 1977)

Masahiro Matsuoka 松岡 昌宏
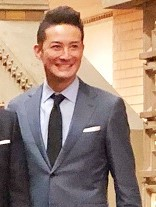

Background information
- Born: January 11, 1977 (age 49); Sapporo, Japan
- Genre: Rock
- Occupations: Drummer; actor
- Instruments: Drums; percussion
- Years active: 1990–present
- Labels: Sony Music Entertainment; Universal Music Japan; Storm Labels
- Formerly of: Tokio
- Website: mmsun.jp

Masahiro Matsuoka (松岡 昌宏, Matsuoka Masahiro; born January 11, 1977) is a Japanese drummer, actor and YouTuber. Former member of Tokio, a musical group under Starto Entertainment, formerly of Johnny & Associates. His nicknames are Mabo and Maa-kun. He starred as Shinichi Ozaki in Godzilla: Final Wars, and comedy series Yasuko to Kenji.

== Early career ==
Matsuoka entered Johnny and Associates when he was 12, after taking the application to the office himself, at around 10 or 11. His reason for entering the entertainment business was because he found his surroundings boring and wanted to do something different. That is when he saw Hikaru Genji. His mother was against it. He didn't even know where the office was located or its phone number, but found some information in the back of a magazine featuring the group. When he called the office, he was denied entry because they thought he was looking for a job at the office instead of entering as a fledgling artist. After passing the written test, he went to the auditions, being one of around 50. During that time, the "bad boy" style was trending, and he was part of it, having shaved his hair and eyebrows, which he had to paint on for the audition at TV Asahi. He was received by a man who, according to Matsuoka, "looked like a janitor getting the room ready". The man, as he later learned, was Johnny Kitagawa. Kitagawa called all the candidates, to start the audition, but when he called Matsuoka by "you", a word frequently used by Kitagawa, he complained, answering "I'm Matsuoka, so don't call me 'You'". He got the call for an interview the following day. Around a month after joining J&A, he was at a training camp, when someone called his name. Matsuoka identified himself, and the person said "Ah, it's you", turned around and left. It was the first time he met his senior Noriyuki Higashiyama.

== Career ==
In January 2026, it was reported that Matsuoka had established a company by the name of MMsun.

On 13 February 2026, after 30 years on the program, Matsuoka announced on his site that he was leaving The! Tetsuwan! Dash!!. On the post, he mentions having meeting Nippon Television's president and telling him about his decision. He also mentions being thankful of their support through the years, and that he will continue supporting those appearing in the program.

=== Music career ===
Matsuoka joined the pop/rock band Tokio as a drummer in 1990, although the band did not debut until 1994. Along with other Tokio members, he was a background dancer for idol bands such as Hikaru Genji. He remained with the group until its dissolution on June 25, 2025, following the report of member Taichi Kokubun's violation of compliance by Nippon Television. The group had an agent contract with Starto Entertainment, which ended by years end. As for Matsuoka, he decided not to renew any kind of contract with the agency after that.

=== Acting career ===
Matsuoka has had parts in over 20 dramas. His acting debut was in the 1990 drama Aishiteru! Sensei. His first lead role was in Psychometrer Eiji, a 1997 mystery science fiction drama. In 2008 he starred a comedy series Yasuko to Kenji, based on a comical manga by artist Aruko.

=== Endorsements ===
Matsuoka has endorsed many brands with the band Tokio and by himself. With Tokio, he has endorsed among others Microsoft's Xbox 360 and Eneos, a brand for Nippon Oil.

He appeared in Marugame Seimen's "Marugame Niku Karamase Udon" cm with Kazunari Ninomiya, which started airing on November 1, 2026

== Filmography ==
Year	Title	Medium	Role	Notes
1993	Ichigo Hakusho	TV		
1994	Hana no Ran	TV	Ashikaga Yoshihisa	Taiga drama
1994	Ari yo Sabara	TV		
1995	Watashi, Mikata Desu	TV		
1996	Hideyoshi	TV	Mori Ranmaru	Taiga drama
1996	Nurse no Oshigoto	TV		Guest role
1996	Yuzurenai Yoru	TV		
1997	Psychometrer Eiji	TV	Eiji	First lead role
1997	Nurse no Oshigoto 2	TV		Guest role
1998	Love and Peace	TV	Kenta Horiguchi	Lead role
1999	Psychometrer Eiji 2	TV	Eiji	Lead role
1999	Tengoku ni Ichiban Chikai Otoko	TV	Shiro Amakasu	Lead role
2000	Shokatsu	TV		Lead role
2001	Tengoku ni Ichiban Chikai Otoko 2	TV	Kazuya Okinoshima	Lead role
2002	Nurseman	TV	Takasawa Yujiro	Lead role
2003	Musashi	TV	Kojiro Sasaki	Taiga drama
2003	Manhattan Love Story	TV	Tencho	Lead role
2003	Glass Rose	Video game	Takashi Kagetani, Kazuya Nanase	Lead role
2004	Nurseman ga Yuku	TV	Yuujirou Takasawa	Lead role
2004	Godzilla: Final Wars	Film	Ozaki Shinichi	Lead role
2006	Yaoh	TV	Ryosuke	Lead role
2007	Oishinbo	TV	Shiro Yamaoka	Lead role. 2007 special only.
2007	Marathon	TV	Noguchi Yoji	
2008	Ten to Chi to	TV	Kagetora Nagao	Lead role
2008	Yasuko to Kenji	TV	Oki Kenji	Lead role
2009	Hissatsu Shigotonin 2009	TV	Ryoji	Hissatsu series
2010	Kaibutsu Kun	TV	Demokin	2010 season
2016	Kaseifu no Mitazono	TV	Kaoru Mitazono	Lead role

=== Dubbing ===
- Hercules (1997) as Hercules
