= Taichi Kokubun =

Japanese keyboardist and actor (born 1974)

Taichi Kokubun 国分 太一
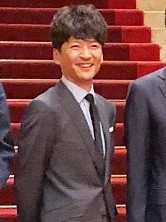
- Kokubun in 2018

Background information
- Born: September 2, 1974 (age 52)
- Origin: Higashikurume, Tokyo, Japan
- Genres: Rock
- Occupations: Keyboardist; actor
- Instruments: Electronic keyboard; piano
- Years active: 1988–2025 (indefinite hiatus)
- Labels: Sony Music Entertainment; Universal Music Japan; Storm Labels

Taichi Kokubun (国分 太一, Kokubun Taichi; born September 2, 1974) is a Japanese keyboardist and actor. He plays keyboard for Tokio, a musical group of Starto Entertainment formerly known as Johnny & Associates.

== Early life ==
Taichi Kokubun was born in Higashikurume, Tokyo.

== Career ==
=== As an artist ===
Before debuting with Tokio, Kokubun, like other Tokio members, was a backup-dancer for Johnny's Entertainment boy bands, including Hikaru Genji. In 1990 he became the keyboardist of Tokio, but it was not until 1994 that the band debuted.

In 2004, Kokubun took a break from Tokio to form a temporary group with KinKi Kids member Tsuyoshi Domoto. Together they released the theme song to Fantastipo, a movie in which they starred.

=== As an actor ===
Kokubun began his acting career with a role in Abunai Shōnen III, a 1989 Japanese drama. Since 1993, he has played parts in drama shows and movies such as Fantistipo and Shaberedomo Shaberedomo.

He has hosted Gachinko! with other Tokio members. Currently Kokubun hosts Kaitai Shin Show and Shonen Club Premium on NHK, Tetsuwan Dash and Guruguru Ninety-Nine on NTV, R30 and Sekai Kurabete Mitara on TBS, Mentore G on Fuji TV, and Aura no Izumi on TV Asahi.

In April 2009, Kokubun became a sportscaster for the Fuji TV show Sports!.

=== Hiatus ===
On June 20, 2025, on a press conference offered by Nippon Television president Hiroyuki Fukuda, it was announced that Kokubun would step down from his hosting duties on Tetsuwan Dash due to "multiple compliance-related incidents in the past" not crime related, without explaining the details, because of privacy protection. Kokubun himself accepted the decision taken by the broadcaster, and apologized for the trouble caused. It was also informed that he would take an indefinite leave of absence. Compliance officers of the broadcaster have revealed that the case is about sexual harassment. Other broadcasters are considering removing Kokubun from their programs. Some sponsors, such as Japanet Holdings, have started removing ads on which he appears. As a result, TV Tokyo cancelled the planned June 22nd broadcast of Danshi Godan and was dropped from the 2025 edition of the TV Tokyo Music Festival. Mainichi Broadcasting System also followed suit by cancelling the planned June 21st broadcast of Tokio Terrace. TBS announced on June 24th that it has dropped him from Sekai Kurabete Mitara. Since the show's episodes are recorded in advance, Kokubun would be edited out from the batch of episodes that TBS had scheduled to air at that time.

On November 26, 2025, Kokubun held a press conference where he apologized to everyone affected over the issue that ended his participation as a Tokio member, as well as the suspension of his activities. He also informed about his lawyer filing a petition for human rights relief with the Japan Federation of Bar Associations in October over the response that Nippon Television had, resulting in Kokubun's decision to step down from "The Tetsuwan Dash".

== Filmography ==
Year/s	Title	Medium	Role	Notes
1989	Abunai Shōnen III	TV		Uncredited role
1993	Dousoukai	TV	Ushio	
1994	Otōsan wa Shinpaisho	TV		
1994	Yagami-kun no Katei no Jijo	TV	Koji Yagami	
1995	Haruyo, Koi	TV		
1995	The Chef	TV	Taichi	
1996	Glass no Kakeratachi	TV		
1997	Kin no Tamago	TV		
1997	Kenshui Nanako	TV	Shinya Aramaki	
1998	Oshigoto Desu	TV		
1999	Yonigeya Honpo	TV		
1999	Shin Oretachi no Tabi	TV		Episode 10 only
2000	Bus Stop	TV	Kyugo Abe	
2001	Omae no Yukichi ga Naiteiru	TV		
2002	Otōsan	TV	Jiro Yamaguchi	
2002	Engimono	TV		Lead role
2004	Tokio	TV	Takumi Miyamoto	Lead role
2005	Hiroshima Showa 20 nen 8 Gatsu Muika	TV	Michaki Shigematsu	
2005	Fantistipo	Movie	Toraji	Starred with KinKi Kids member Tsuyoshi Domoto, whom he released the theme song to the movie with
2006	Dance Drill	TV	Wataru Ishibashi	
2007	Inochi no Iro Enpitsu	TV		Lead role
2007	Shaberedomo Shaberedomo	Movie	Mitsuba	Award a Mainichi Film Award for Best Actor
