= Storm Labels =

Japanese music and film company

Storm Labels Inc.
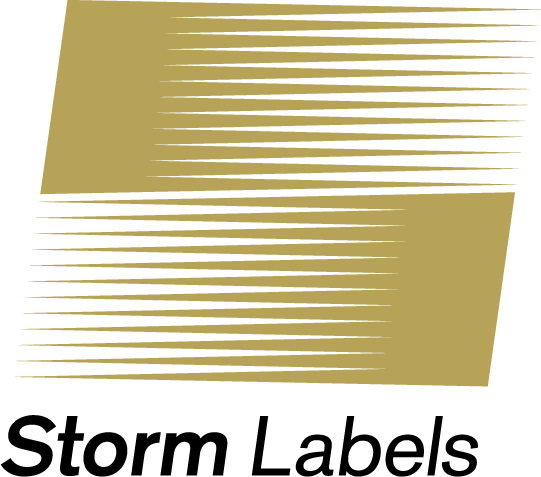
- Native name: 株式会社ストームレーベルズ
- Romanized name: Kabushikigaisha Sutōm Rēberuzu
- Company type: Private
- Industry: Music, Film
- Founded: 2001
- Headquarters: Tokyo, Japan
- Subsidiaries: Infinity Records; Elov Label (formerly Johnny's Entertainment Record)
- Website: https://www.storm-labels.co.jp/

Storm Labels
- Parent company: Storm Labels, Inc.
- Founded: 2001
- Founder: Johnny Kitagawa
- Distributors: (Japan) Sony Music Marketing (Hong Kong) Avex Asia; Avex Taiwan (South Korea) SM/Kakao, Sony Korea (Note: For KAT-TUN's releases only (since 2023)) (Thailand) GMM Grammy (Philippines) Universal (United States) The Orchard
- Genre: J-pop
- Country of origin: Japan
- Location: Tokyo

Storm Labels, Inc. (株式会社ストームレーベルズ, Kabushikigaisha Sutōm Rēberuzu), previously known as J Storm, Inc. (株式会社ジェイ・ストーム, Kabushikigaisha Jei Sutōm) is a Japanese music and film company. It was established on November 12, 2001, initially as a label for the Johnny & Associates' group, Arashi, after which it was named.

Aside from producing and releasing CDs and DVDs, the company also produces films for Starto Entertainment's various talents. Storm also has the same strict policies for portrait rights of its talents with its parent company. Among others, images of their talents are prohibited to appear in websites, though on 28 February 2011, the ban was lifted and loosened the regulations (it is still prohibited in news sites). The ban was lifted completely on 31 January 2018.

The company's releases are currently being distributed by Avex Asia in Hong Kong and Taiwan, Sony Music in Japan, SM Entertainment in South Korea, GMM Grammy in Thailand, and recently, Universal Records in the Philippines, and Sony Music subsidiary The Orchard in the United States.

In the wake of the Johnny Kitagawa sexual abuse scandal, it was announced in October 2023 that J Storm would be renamed to Storm Labels effective January 1, 2024.

== Artists ==
J Storm produced Arashi's singles and albums since 2002 with the release of the single, "A Day in Our Life", after being signed under Pony Canyon from their debut in 1999. In 2006, KAT-TUN debuted and began to release under J-One Records, their exclusive record label. It was named J-One for the label's thrust of releasing chart-topping releases. All of their released singles and albums have reached the top of the Oricon charts. They continued to release under J-One until May 2013. In 2007, Hey! Say! JUMP debuted and began to release singles and albums under J Storm. In 2008, another Johnny's group, Tokio, began to release under the J Storm label. In Nov 12, 2021, Naniwa Danshi debuted and began to release singles and albums under J Storm.

- Arashi
- KAT-TUN
- Hey! Say! JUMP
- TOKIO
- Naniwa Danshi

=== Infinity Records ===
Infinity Records is Kanjani Eight's independent label.

- Kanjani Eight

=== Elov Label ===
Johnny's Entertainment, Inc. (株式会社ジャニーズ・エンタテイメント, Kabushikigaisha Janīzu Entateimento) was established on February 14, 1997, by Johnny & Associates, initially as a label for KinKi Kids. Aside from producing and releasing CDs and DVDs for the groups under it, the label also produced CDs and DVDs for temporary Johnny's units such as J-Friends and Shūji to Akira. Before the establishment of the sister company J Storm, the label produced DVDs for KAT-TUN, Kanjani Eight, and Johnny's Jr. In May 2003, Johnny's Entertainment began investing in the Swedish music publisher Reactive Songs International. The company closed on May 31, 2019, and transferred to J Storm, re-branded as Johnny's Entertainment Record. As of January 1, 2024, Johnny's Entertainment Record was rebranded as Elov Label.

- Shonentai
- KinKi Kids
- NEWS
- Yuma Nakayama
- Johnny's West

== Films ==
- Pika☆nchi Life is Hard Dakedo Happy 「ピカ☆ンチ Life is Hard だけど Happy」 (2002)
- Cosmic Rescue (2003)
- Pika☆☆nchi Life is Hard Dakara Happy 「ピカ☆☆ンチ Life is Hard だから Happy」(2004)
- Fantastipo (2005)
- Hold Up Down 「ホールドアップダウン」 (2006)
- Kiiroi Namida 「黄色い涙」 (2007)
- Otonari 「おと・な・り」 (2008)
- The Seaside Motel 「シーサイドモーテル」 (2010)
- Topknot Pudding 「ちょんまげぷりん」 (2010)
- Eight Ranger 「エイトレンジャー」 (2012)
- It's me, It's me 「俺俺」 (2013)
- Pikanchi Half 「ピカ☆★☆ンチ Life is Hard たぶん Happy」 (2014)
- La La La at Rock Bottom 「味園ユニバース」 (2015)

=== Co-productions ===
- Boku wa Imōto ni Koi o Suru 「僕は妹に恋をする」 (2006)
- Eiga Kurosagi 「映画 クロサギ」 (2008)
- Kakushi Toride no San-Akunin: The Last Princess 「隠し砦の三悪人 THE LAST PRINCESS」 (2008)
- Hana Yori Dango Final 「花より男子F」 (2008)
- Heaven's Door 「ヘブンズ・ドア」 (2009)

== Notable soundtrack releases ==
- Kisarazu Cat's Eye (film) Original Soundtrack
- Yaji and Kita: The Midnight Pilgrims (film) Original Soundtrack
- Hana Yori Dango (TV series) Original Soundtrack
