= Tomoya Nagase =

Japanese singer & actor (born 1978)

Tomoya Nagase 長瀬 智也
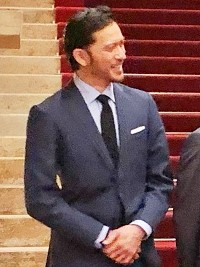

Background information
- Born: November 7, 1978 (age 47)
- Origin: Aoba-ku, Yokohama, Japan
- Genres: Power pop; pop rock
- Occupations: Singer-songwriter; actor; model
- Instruments: Vocals; guitar; harmonica; saxophone
- Years active: 1993–present
- Labels: Sony Music Entertainment; Universal Music Japan; J Storm; Challenger Records

Tomoya Nagase (長瀬 智也, Nagase Tomoya; born November 7, 1978) is a Japanese singer-songwriter, actor, and model. He was a member of Tokio, a Johnny & Associates musical group. He was the primary vocalist, in addition to playing the guitar alongside Tokio's leader, Shigeru Joshima.

== Career ==
=== As an artist ===
He was inspired by bands Hikaru Genji and SMAP to answer a recruiting call of Johnny & Associates and was accepted in 1990. In 1992, he played several stage plays (Playzone and Mask) together with other Tokio members. He first played tambourine during Tokio's early performances as SMAP's background dancers. Just prior to Tokio's debut, the band's rhythm guitarist, Hiromu Kojima, left the band and was replaced by Tomoya Nagase.

In 1997, Nagase collaborated with American R&B group 3T to record the Japanese version of Eternal Flame, which was used as the theme song for the Japanese drama D×D, in which he starred. The single was released under the artist name "Tomoya with 3T" and reached number 12 on the Oricon charts. Nagase lists Guns N' Roses as his favorite band.

In July 2020 it was announced that Nagase will be leaving Johnny & Associates in 2021.

On June 6, 2023, Nagase released an album with his new band, Kode Talkers, through Challenger Records. The album is titled the same as the band name. Nagase is the lead vocalist and guitarist along with Kotaro Kubota, who also does chorus/back vocals. An artist named Fire does the bass and back vocals; Kiyohide Ura on keyboard; and Daiki Nakahata on drums are the rest of the band. On the album, there are nine songs: 情熱のグルーブ; 例のモノ; When I; ハンディキャンディマン; Wonder; どっかに置いといて; 脱力の法則; 帯電Youthful; Free Wheelers.

=== As an actor ===
Nagase has had parts in over 40 dramas. His first lead role was in Hakusen Nagashi (1996). More lead roles followed including Ikebukuro West Gate Park, My Husband, Unubore Deka, and Tiger & Dragon. Mukodono! was his first comedic role. In My Boss My Hero he had another comedic role. He received an "Yūjirō Ishihara Newcomer Award" in 2002 as "The Best Newcomer" for his role in the movie Seoul.

=== Endorsements ===
Nagase has endorsed many various brands with the band Tokio and by himself. He is currently a brand ambassador for Fujicolor and Lotte Toppo. With Tokio, he has endorsed among others Microsoft's Xbox 360 and Eneos, a brand for Nippon Oil. As an actor, he has also endorsed UFO Nissin noodles, Lotte Coolish drinks, Subaru, Morinaga, Suntory Dry beer, Mazda, All Nippon Airways, NTT Docomo, Hitachi Wooo, and Uniqlo.

== Filmography ==
=== Film ===
Year	Title	Role	Notes	Ref.
2002	Seoul	Yutaro Hayase	Lead role	
2005	Yaji and Kita: The Midnight Pilgrims	Yaji	Lead role	
2007	Sword of the Stranger	Nanashi (voice)	Lead role	
2009	Heaven's Door	Masato Aoyama	Lead role	
2016	Too Young to Die!	Killer K	Lead role	
2018	Recall	Tokuro Akamatsu	Lead role	

=== Television ===
Year	Title	Role	Notes	Ref.
1996	Hakusen Nagashi	Wataru Ookouchi	Lead role	
1997	Hakusen Nagashi: Spring at Age 19	Wataru Ookouchi	Lead role; television film	
1999	Hakusen Nagashi: The Wind at Age 20	Wataru Ookouchi	Lead role; television film	
2000	Ikebukuro West Gate Park	Makoto Majima	Lead role	
2001	Hakusen Nagashi: The Poem of Travels	Wataru Ookouchi	Lead role; television film	
2003	Hakusen Nagashi: Age 25	Wataru Ookouchi	Lead role; television film	
2004	Otouto	Shintaro Ishihara		
2005	Hakusen Nagashi: The Final – Even as the Times of Dreaming Have Passed	Wataru Ookouchi	Lead role; television film	
2005	Tiger & Dragon	Kotora Yamazaki	Lead role	
2006	My Boss My Hero	Makio Sakaki	Lead role	
2013	Kurokochi	Keita Kurokochi	Lead role	
2016	Fragile	Keiichirō Kishi	Lead role	
2021	Story of My Family!!!	Juichi Miyama	Lead role	

== Awards and nominations ==
Year	Award	Category	Work(s)	Result	Ref.
2002	15th Nikkan Sports Film Awards	Yūjirō Ishihara Newcomer Award	Seoul	Won	

== Awards and nominations ==
Year	Award	Category	Work(s)	Result	Ref.
2002	15th Nikkan Sports Film Awards	Yūjirō Ishihara Newcomer Award	Seoul	Won	
