= 2004 Arashi! Iza, Now Tour!! =

Video by Arashi
- Released: January 1, 2005
- Recorded: August 3, 2004
- Venue: Yokohama Arena
- Genre: Live
- Length: 156 mins
- Label: J Storm

Arashi chronology
How's It Going? Summer Concert 2003 (2003)	2004 Arashi! Iza, Now Tour!! (2005)	Arashi Around Asia: Thailand-Taiwan-Korea (2007)

2004 Arashi! Iza, Now Tour!! is the fourth video album by Japanese boy band Arashi. It was released by J Storm on January 1, 2005 and contains concert footage from their Iza, Now Tour, filmed at Yokohama Arena in Yokohama, Japan on August 3, 2004. The video album peaked at number three on the Oricon DVD chart. It was certified Gold by the Recording Industry Association of Japan (RIAJ) in June 2006.

== Background and release ==
Arashi's fourth summer concert tour, the Iza, Now Tour, promoted their fourth studio album, Iza, Now!. From late-July to late-August, the band played in front of 300,000 people throughout Japan. The concert was recorded on August 3, 2004 at Yokohama Arena in Yokohama, watched by a crowd of 17,000. Five months later, the video was released in Japan by J Storm. Backstage footage of the band arriving and departing from each venue, and the MC, a short customary talk during the intermission, was included as a bonus feature on the second disc. It was released in Taiwan on August 14, 2009.

== Commercial performance ==
2004 Arashi! Iza, Now Tour!! debuted at number three on the Oricon DVD chart, with 67,000 copies sold in its first week. In June 2006, it was certified Gold by the RIAJ for shipments of 100,000 units. In 2010, it reached number 49 on the Oricon year-end Music DVD chart. The release charted for 326 weeks and went on to sell over 211,000 copies. In 2019, after Arashi announced a halt in activities, the video re-entered the Oricon DVD chart, peaking at number 48 on the date ending February 11, 2019.

== Track listing ==
Disc 1
No.	Title	Length
1.	"Jam"
2.	"Gori Muchū" (五里霧中)
3.	"Pikanchi"
4.	"Pikanchi Double"
5.	"Horizon"
6.	"Dangan Liner"
7.	"Nemuranai Karada" (眠らないカラダ)
8.	"Dear My Friend"
9.	"Top Secret" (Satoshi Ohno solo)
10.	"Lucky Man"
11.	"Hadashi no Mirai"
12.	"Kimi dake o Omotteru" (君だけを想ってる)
13.	"Eyes With Delight" (includes multi-angle option)
14.	"Unti Unti" (Sho Sakurai solo)
15.	"Tomadoi Nagara"
16.	"Kimi wa Sukoshi mo Warukunai" (君は少しも悪くない)
17.	"Yasashikutte Sukoshi Baka" (優しくって少しバカ, Masaki Aiba solo)
18.	"Hitomi no Naka no Galaxy"
19.	"Kako" (痕跡, Kazunari Ninomiya solo)
20.	"La Familia" (Jun Matsumoto solo)
21.	"A Day in Our Life"
22.	"Right Back to You"
23.	"Arashi no Mae no Shizukesa" (嵐のまえの静けさ)
24.	"Kimi no Tame ni Boku ga Iru"
25.	"Sunrise Nippon"
26.	"Arashi"
27.	"Tochū Gesha" (途中下車)
28.	"Kotoba Yori Taisetsu na Mono"
29.	"Hero"
30.	"Kansha Kangeki Ame Arashi"

Disc 2
No.	Title	Length
1.	"MC in Yokohama Arena"
2.	"Backstage: Entrance"
3.	"Backstage: Exit"

== Tour ==
Iza, Now Tour!!
- Tour by Arashi
- Associated album: Iza, Now!
- Start date: July 27, 2004
- End date: August 31, 2004
- No. of shows: 27 in Japan
- Attendance: 300,000

Arashi concert chronology
- Live is Hard dakara Happy Tour (2003–2004); Iza, Now Tour!! (2004); One Summer Tour (2005)

=== Concert synopsis ===
Typical of any Johnny's concerts, Iza Now Tour included extravagant sets and stage design. The main stage consist of a large half globe structure that opens up for Arashi's entrance to new songs or different sets while huge LED screens displayed close-ups of the performances or graphics as added effect. The small adjoining walkway were constructed of inflatable material that made them bounce while walking on it. There was also a concave walkway that was at eye level with a part of the arena area audience. Raising platforms and cranes were also used so that the Arashi members will be able to get closer to the audience on the second floor.

Variety of themes can be observed for different parts of the set list. The first set of performance (Overture, Jam, Gori Muchuu, Pikanchi and Pikanchi Double) were presented in futuristic themed wardrobes in addition with use of pyrotechnics and lights. The setting changed dramatically to an African safari like set for Horizon, accompanied by an army of camouflaged Johnny's Junior (back up dancers). The songs for this set (Horizon, Dangan-Liner and Nemuranai Karada) were remixed in accordance with the African theme.

Performance of Lucky Man right to Eyes With Delight was done in a laid back manner. Eyes With Delight was recorded in multiple angles focusing on each member plus one edited shots of all of them together.

Strumming of a Spanish guitar commenced the beginning of a new rendition of Tomadoi Nagara in a slower beat and acoustic Spanish influenced sound. The beautiful ballad was performed with images of Spain reflected on the screen in the background. Kimi Wa Sukoshimo Warukunai which was a pure pop song was upgraded with flamenco beat resulting to a fresh new arrangement. Arashi who were dressed in dark magenta suits with lace finishing, danced the flamenco while the fangirls screamed in approval.

After the solos by Ninomiya and Matsujun, Arashi performed a rock remixed version of their hit song "A Day in Our Life". An energetic dance performance of "RIGHT BACK TO YOU" follows. The dance was performed on an elevated stage. The set of songs after that consist of happy songs setting the mood before they bid their farewells.
