= Iza, Now! =

Studio album by Arashi
- Released: 21 July 2004
- Genre: Pop, R&B, rock
- Length: 64:10
- Label: J Storm

Arashi chronology
| How's It Going? (2003) | Iza, Now! (2004) | 5x5 The Best Selection of 2002–2004 (2004) |

Singles from Iza, Now!
- 1. "Hadashi no Mirai/Kotoba Yori Taisetsu na Mono" Released: 3 September 2003; 2. "Pikanchi Double" Released: 18 February 2004

Iza, Now! (いざッ、Now!) is the fourth studio album of Japanese boy band Arashi. It was released on 21 July 2004 through J Storm. Two singles were released from the album: "Hadashi no Mirai/Kotoba Yori Taisetsu na Mono" and "Pikanchi Double". The album debuted at number one in Japan, selling 115,000 copies in its first week.

== Background and release ==
The album comes one year after the group's third studio album How's It Going?. According to Arashi member Masaki Aiba, the album's title Iza, Now! means "to tempt" (誘う, izanau). Member Sho Sakurai co-wrote lyrics for the songs "Kotoba Yori Taisetsu na Mono", "The Bubble", "Pikanchi Double", "Eyes with Delight", and "Right Back to You". "Right Back to You" was used as the background song for a Parco commercial. American musician Omar Hakim participated in recording the songs "Jam", "Eyes With Delight", and "Rainbow".

Iza, Now! was released on 21 July 2004 in Japan, in two editions: a regular edition and a limited edition. Though the two editions contains the same tracks, only the limited edition contained a booklet and a DVD containing five music videos chosen by fans. It was released under the Avex Asia label in Taiwan and Hong Kong on 24 August 2004 and 8 September 2004, respectively.

The album was released digitally on February 7, 2020.

== Promotion ==
To promote the album, Arashi embarked on the Iza, Now Tour!!. They had 27 shows beginning on 27 July at the Osaka-jō Hall, followed by Yokohama Arena on 2 August, Nagoya Rainbow Hall on 6 August, Hokkaido Prefectural Sports Center on 11 August, Sekisui Heim Super Arena on 15 August, Nagano Wakasato Tamokuteki Sports Arena on 17 August, Hiroshima Prefectural Sports Center on 20 August, Toki Messe on 24 August, Hamamatsu Arena on 29 August, and Marine Messe Fukuoka on 31 August 2004.

== Singles ==
Arashi released the double A-side single "Hadashi no Mirai/Kotoba Yori Taisetsu na Mono" on 3 September 2003. It peaked at number two on the Oricon Singles Chart and achieved a platinum certification. "Hadashi no Mirai" was used as the campaign song for Coca-Cola while "Kotoba Yori Taisetsu na Mono" was used as the theme song for the television series Stand Up!!, starring Arashi member Kazunari Ninomiya, Tomohisa Yamashita, Anne Suzuki, Hiroki Narimiya, and Shun Oguri.

"Pikanchi Double" was released on 18 February 2004, and was used as the theme song for Arashi's starring film Pikanchi: Life is Hard dakara Happy, the sequel to Pikanchi: Life is Hard dakedo Happy. It peaked at number one on the Oricon Singles Chart.

== Commercial performance ==
Iza, Now! debuted at number one on the Oricon Albums Chart, marking the group's second number-one album in Japan. It sold 115,000 copies in its first week and spent eight weeks on the chart. The album went on to sell around 151,000 copies overall. In July 2004, the album was certified Gold for shipments of 100,000 copies by the Recording Industry Association of Japan.

== Track listing ==
| No. | Title | Lyrics | Music | Arrangement | Length |
|---|---|---|---|---|---|
| 1. | "Kotoba Yori Taisetsu na Mono" | Takeshi; Sho Sakurai | Takehiko Iida | Tomoki Ishizuka | 4:03 |
| 2. | "Jam" | Yōji Kubota | Tobias Lindell; Joel Eriksson; Victor Wiszniewski | Masayuki Iwata | 4:12 |
| 3. | "The Bubble" | Spin; Sakurai | Peter Bjorklund; Eriksson | Akira | 3:54 |
| 4. | "Thank You for My Days" | Takeshi | Iwata | Iwata | 4:55 |
| 5. | "Pikanchi Double" | Spin; Sakurai | Kōsuke Morimoto | Ishizuka | 5:08 |
| 6. | "Keep a Peak" (instrumental) | | Taku Yoshioka | Yoshioka | 1:51 |
| 7. | "Eyes with Delight" | Kubota; Sakurai | Minoru Komorita | Ishizuka | 4:30 |
| 8. | "Right Back to You" | Spin; Sakurai | Bjorklund; Eriksson | Ha-j | 3:35 |
| 9. | "Rainbow" | Kubota | Komorita | Ishizuka | 4:17 |
| 10. | "Hadashi no Mirai" | Ayumi Miyazaki | Miyazaki | Chokkaku |
| 11. | "Yasashikutte Sukoshi Baka" | Takeshi Inoue | Inoue | Ha-j | 3:43 |
| 12. | "Dear My Friend" | Takashi Ogawa | Junjiro Seki | Seki | 4:55 |
| 13. | "Kimi dake o Omotteru" | Kubota | Kōji Makaino | Naoki Ōtsubo | 4:49 |
| 14. | "Check no Muffler" | Takeshi | Morimoto | Iwata | 5:19 |
| 15. | "Tochū Gesha" | Spin | Morimoto | Ha-j | 4:15 |
| Total length: | | | | | 64:10 |

DVD: Arashi Best 5 Clips
| No. | Title | Director | Length |
|---|---|---|---|
| 1. | "Arashi" | Kensuke Kawamura |
| 2. | "A Day in Our Life" | Kawamura |
| 3. | "Kimi no Tame ni Boku ga Iru" |
| 4. | "Typhoon Generation" | Tetsurō Takeuchi |
| 5. | "Tomadoi Nagara" | Tetsuo Inoue |

== Charts and certifications ==
=== Weekly charts ===
| Chart (2004) | Peak position |
|---|---|
| Japanese Albums (Oricon) | 1 |

=== Certifications ===
| Region | Certification | Certified units/sales |
|---|---|---|
| Japan (RIAJ) | Gold | 151,000 |

== Release history ==
| Region | Release date | Format | Label |
|---|---|---|---|
| Japan | 21 July 2004 | CD; CD+DVD | J Storm |
| Taiwan | 24 August 2004 | CD; CD+DVD | Avex Asia |
| Hong Kong | 8 September 2004 | CD; CD+DVD | Avex Asia |
