= List of KochiKame episodes =

Kochira Katsushika-ku Kameari Kōen-mae Hashutsujo (KochiKame) is a Japanese comedy manga series written and illustrated by Osamu Akimoto. Produced by Studio Gallop, it ran for eight years before ending on December 19, 2004.

== Theme music ==
The series use twenty four pieces of theme music: seven opening and fourteen ending themes.

- From episodes 1–12, the opening theme is "Natsu ga Kita! (Diamond Head) – Nagisa no Joō-sama yori" (夏が来た!(Diamond Head) – ｢渚の女王様｣より; "Summer is Here! (Diamond Head) – from The Queen's Shores") by Joō-sama while the ending theme is "Smile" (スマイル, Sumairu) by Hoff Dylan.
- From episodes 13–38, the opening theme is "Everybody Can Do!" by Tokio while the ending theme is "Ii Koto Aru sa" (いいことあるさ) by The Collectors.
- From episodes 39–145, the opening theme is "Katsushika Rhapsody" (葛飾ラプソディー, Katsushika Rapusodī) by Kohei Dojima while the ending themes are "Lady no Yume wa Mangekyō" (淑女(レディー)の夢は万華鏡, Redī no Yume wa Mangekyō; "A Lady's Dream is a Kaleidoscope") by Megumi Okina, "Buway no Biya Biya" (ブウェーのビヤビヤ, Buwē ni Biya Biya) by George Tokoro, and ""KYUN"" by Kanae.
- From episodes 146-154, the opening theme is "Kochira Kameza no Onna" (こちら亀座の女; "This is the Pisces Woman") by Shu Yamada and Hello Nights while the ending themes are "Kimi to Boku" (君と僕; "You and Me") by The Love and "Kimochi da yo" (気持ちだよ; "A Feeling!") by Takuro Yoshida.
- From episodes 155-206, the opening theme is "Oide yo Kameari" (おいでよ亀有; "Come to Kameari") by Kankichi Ryōtsu and the Kochikame Wiiin Chorus while the ending themes are,"Kimochi da yo" (気持ちだよ; "A Feeling!") by Takuro Yoshida, "Mainichi, No Problem" (毎日、ノープロブレム, Mainichi, Nō Puroburemu; "Everyday, No Problem") by Rieko Miura & Kanako Mitsuhashi, and "Robo Keiji Banchō no Uta" (ロボ刑事番長の歌; "Robot Detective Boss' Song") by LaSalle Ishii.
- From episodes 207-325, the opening theme is "Damatte Ore ni Tsuite Koi" (だまって俺についてこい; "Shut Up, Follow Me") by Yoshimi Tendo while the ending themes are "Mainichi, No Problem" (毎日、ノープロブレム, Mainichi, Nō Puroburemu; "Everyday, No Problem") by Rieko Miura & Kanako Mitsuhashi, "Oide yo Kameari" (おいでよ亀有; "Come to Kameari") by Kankichi Ryotsu and The Kochikame Chorus, "Nice na Kokoroiki" (ナイスな心意気, Naisu na Kokoroiki; "Nice Disposition") by Arashi, "Natsu ga Kita! (Diamond Head) – Nagisa no Joō-sama yori" (夏が来た!(Diamond Head) – ｢渚の女王様｣より; "Summer is Here! (Diamond Head) – from The Queen's Shores") by Joō-sama, "Tetsu and Tomo no "Nande Darō" ~Ryō-san Version~" (テツandトモのなんでだろう～両さんバージョン～, Tetsu ando Tomo no Nande Darō ~Ryō-san Bājon~) by Tetsu and Tomo, "Tetsu and Tomo's "Nande Darō" ~Kochikame version~" (テツandトモのなんでだろう～こち亀バージョン～, Tetsu ando Tomo no Nande Darō ~Kochikame Bājon~) by Tetsu and Tomo, and "Hai, Irasshai (HAI, IRASSHAI（ハイ!いらっしゃい）; "Yes, Welcome") by Nice Guy Jin.
- From episodes 326-373, the opening theme is "Katsushika Rhapsody ~Yum Yum Version~" (葛飾ラプソディー～ヤムヤムversion～, Katsushika Rapusodī ~Yamu Yamu Bājon~) by Yum!Yum! Orange while the ending themes are "Katare! Namida!" (語れ! 涙!; "Speak! Cry!") by Sex Machineguns, "Nice na Kokoroiki" (ナイスな心意気, Naisu na Kokoroiki; "Nice Disposition") by Arashi, and #"Jugemu ~Kochikame version~" (ジュゲム～こち亀バージョン～, Jugemu ~Kochikame Bājon~) by Kankichi Ryotsu & Oh-Edo Typhoon.

== Episode list ==
=== 1996 ===
Air date	EP#	English title	Japanese title	Manga source
6-16	1	The XX Cop Ryotsu Appears!?	XX警官両津現る!?	Original
6-23	2	The Rookie Cop Who Came from the Sky	空から来た新人警官	64-2
6-30	3	Great Business! The Sky-Flying Stall!	大繁盛! 空飛ぶ屋台	85-10
7-7	4	One-Shot at Big Bucks: The Lottery Guy	一発千金宝クジ野郎	83-1
7-28	5	I Love Skiing on Shaved Ice	かき氷でスキスキー	61-4
8-4	6	The Great Chase of Reiko's Wrath!	麗子怒りの大追跡!	55-8
8-11	7	Wake Up! The Hibernating Cop	めざめよ! 冬眠警官	21-6
8-18	8	Open the Gate of Victory!	勝鬨橋ひらけ!	71-9
9-1	9	Thorough Sumo!	トコトン大相撲!	83-8
9-8	10	The Offrail・Reckless・Rowdy Noisemaker!	脱線・暴走・大爆走!	14-6
9-15	11	The Honour to See Nakagawa-kun's Residence	中川君のお宅拝見	5-4
9-22	12	Crash! Tokyoite Wars	激突! 江戸っ子合戦	47-2
10-27	13	You Mean Ryostu and Reiko are...	まさか両津と麗子が...	45-7
11-3	14	Together with Mr. Elephant	ゾウさんといっしょ	74-1
11-10	15	Run! For the Sake of Honda's Love	走れ! 本田愛のために	35-2
11-17	16	The Ohara Family's Secret Treasure!?	大原家の秘宝!?	14-1; 19-1
11-24	17	The Great Cockroach Race	ゴキブリ大レース	69-11
12-1	18	What a Photo! A Reproduction of the Kyoto Trip	激写! 京都旅行再現	100-4
12-8	19	Plans to Rebuild the Soba Shop!	そば屋再建計画!	47-10
12-15	20	Ways to Win the Ryotsu Tests	両津式テスト必勝法	88-4
12-29	21	Bonus Wars Battle	ボーナス争奪バトル	78-1
12-29	22	Ryotsu mecamoth declaration	両津メチャモテ宣言	88-7

=== 1997 ===
Air date	EP#	English title	Japanese title	Manga source
1-12	23	Fresh Spring Patrol Karuta!	新春バトルカルタ!	8-1; 43-6
1-19	24	Japan's Number 1 Irresponsible Parent and Child	日本一の無責任親子	7-2; 14-4
1-26	25	Prudence Ain't Scary at All	謹慎なんか怖くない	18-4; 24-9
2-2	26	Gaining Viewership!	視聴率稼ぎます!	89-1
2-9	27	The Super Rich Shiratori Reiji	超(スーパー)金持ち!白鳥麗次	69-5; 73-7
2-16	28	Ryo-san's Great Escape!	両さんの大脱走!	60-5
2-23	29	Men's Rapport Hinoki Bath	男の触愛ひのき風呂	79-5
3-2	30	Messy Hinamatsuri	さんざんひな祭り	8-9; 39-3
3-9	31	Ninja vs. Indie Ryotsu	忍者対インディ両津	52-3; 52-4
3-16	32	Ryotsu is Currently in Training	両津ただいま修行中	44-9
3-23	33	Ah, My Home	あぁ、マイホーム	16-9
4-13	34	The Rumoured Detective Speedo Appears	噂の海パン刑事登場	76-2
4-13	35	Hyper Elementary Students vs. Ryotsu	ハイパー小学生VS両津	82-8
4-13	36	Chief! That's a Light from Paris	部長よ! あれがパリの灯だ	46-6
4-13	37	Bam! God vs. Ryotsu	激突! 神VS両津	57-7; 54-2; 58-10
4-27	38	Tears in the Chief's Eyes	部長の目にも涙	22-6
5-4	39	Give Back the (Secret) Photo!	（秘）写真をとり返せ!	66-6
5-11	40	Live for all-you-can-eat buffet	命かけます食べ放題	65-2
5-18	41	He's Back! Shiratori Reiji	再登場! 白鳥麗次	89-5
5-25	42	Burning Love! Ryotsu and Maria	熱愛! 両津とマリア	67-4
6-1	43	Direct Laughs, Direct Hits of Hondara-Ken	笑撃直撃ホンダラ拳	68-1
6-8	44	First Love! Was That Ryotsu?	初恋の人! それは両津?	83-7
6-15	45	crocodile public! tears entertainter soul	ワニ公! 涙の芸人魂	67-2
6-22	46	The Storm-Calling Great Baseball Meet!	嵐を呼ぶ野球大会!	52-7
6-29	47	Ryo-san's Newcomer Training	両さんの新人研修	67-3
6-29	48	Electrical Wedding! Ryotsu Kankichi	電撃結婚! 両津勘吉	83-4; 83-5
6-29	49	Ryo-san's New Puppet Release!	両さん人形新発売!	58-1; 102-9
7-6	50	torrent houseboat panic	激流屋形船パニック	67-9
7-13	51	Ryo-san's Operation Gold-Digger	両さんの逆玉大作戦	37-5
8-3	52	Hondara-ken in Canada	カナダで翻堕羅拳!	68-9; 68-10
8-10	53	Yum! The Recipe for Revenge	美味! 復讐のレシピ	77-5; 77-6
8-17	54	Profit from the Haunted House!	オバケでまる儲け!	66-5
8-24	55	The Beautiful Wife is Just Too Much	美人妻はチョー過激	76-7; 76-8
8-31	56	An Asakusa First-Romance Tale	浅草初恋物語	76-10
9-14	57	The Fighting Gamer Sakonji	闘魂ゲーマー左近寺	99-1
9-21	58	Hideous Photo Panic	お下劣写真パニック	99-2; 101-4
10-12	59	Kaboom! Grandpa's Power	炸裂! 爺さんパワー	35-9; 65-10; 99-8
10-19	60	Women are Welcome in Bachelor's Apartment	独身寮は女人歓迎	32-8; 88-8
10-26	61	The Chief's Illegitimate Child Suspicion!?	部長の隠し子疑惑!?	41-9
11-2	62	Matsutake Coastguards Dispatch	マツタケ警備隊出動	77-2
11-16	63	Hondara-ken Hanging by a Thread	ホンダラ拳危機一髪	68-3
11-23	64	Farewell Chief Ohara!?	さらば大原部長!?	49-9
11-30	65	Run! The Rider of Unrequited Love	走れ! 失恋ライダー	84-6; 90-3
12-7	66	Big Scoops! The Great Newspaper Wars	熱写! 新聞大戦争	80-7
12-14	67	Bonus Wars 2	ボーナス争奪戦2	53-5
12-21	68	Unattended Video-Recording Syndrome	留守録シンドローム	69-4; 75-1

=== 1998 ===
Air date	EP#	English title	Japanese title	Manga source
1-4	69	Hondara's Explosive New Year Meet	爆発ホンダラ新年会	68-6
1-4	70	You Like Violent Vacations!?	バカンスは激しいのがお好き!?	46-3; 46-4
1-4	71	Get Him! Ryotsu the Dog	追跡! 名犬リョーツ	87-7
1-18	72	Showdown! Fishing for Girls	対決! 美女一本釣り	105-8
1-25	73	The Old Man and the Bomb Demon	じいさんと爆弾魔	33-2
2-1	74	Honda's Final Love!?	本田、最後の恋!?	94-4; 94-5
2-15	75	The Banned Girl Dolls!	禁断の美少女人形!	102-4
2-22	76	Firing Up Camp Spirit!	燃えるキャンプ魂!	85-2
3-1	77	The Outrageous Professor Appears!	トンデモ教授登場!	84-1
3-8	78	Totally Safe! Ryotsu Tours	絶対安心! 両津観光	45-1
3-15	79	The Day the Haunted Smoke Disappeared	お化け煙突が消えた日	59-8
3-22	80	box man of fear	恐怖の箱男!?	68-7
4-12	81	The Deadly CEO! Nakagawa's Father	猛烈社長! 中川の父	69-2
4-12	82	Most Dangerous Survival Situation!?	最も危険なサバイバル!?	54-9
4-12	83	Human Crane of Desire	欲望の人間クレーン	73-8; 74-9
4-19	84	One Heck of a New Discovery	暴走トンデモ新発明	84-5
4-26	85	Struggle! Flower-blooming Ryo-san	奮闘! 花咲か両さん	70-4
5-3	86	volvo cohabitation era	ボルボの同棲時代!?	93-5; 93-6
5-10	87	Fly! The Police Patrol Car Section	翔べ! パトカー警部	88-9
5-24	88	Dash! The Speedy Stall	激走! スピード屋台	45-6
5-31	89	Transform Beautifully! Detective Moonlight	華麗に変身! 月光刑事	87-2
6-7	90	Unexploded Bomb Delivery	不発弾とどけます	61-10
6-14	91	Ryotsu Dies!?	両津死す! ナニィ!?	57-2; 57-5
6-21	92	Stuck Together! The Dangerous Duo	密着! 危険なふたり	56-7
6-28	93	Ship-Sinking! Ninja Jii-san	撃沈! 忍者じいさん	81-4
7-5	94	Ouch! Ryotsu Dies Again	大ハード! 両津勘吉は二度死ぬ	55-1
7-12	95	Road Safety Demon!	交通安全の鬼!	28-7
7-26	96	It's Born! Detective Dove-Pocket	誕生! 鳩ポッポ刑事	80-9
8-2	97	Scary! My Long-Haired Friend	恐怖! 髪は長い友達	24-6; 61-6; 65-8
8-9	98	GO to the Baseball Game!	野球ゲームでGO!	103-4; 106-8
8-16	99	This is the Person I Like	これが私の好きな人	107-3; 107-4
8-23	100	Present from Space	宇宙からの贈り物	66-4
8-30	101	A Two-Shot to Long for	憧れのツーショット	107-5
9-6	102	The Cursed Umeboshi Jar	呪いの梅干し壺	81-7
9-13	103	Nakagawa was Raised Downtown?	中川君は下町育ち?	106-9
10-4	104	Can't Stop Losing Teeth	歯無しにならない話	64-7
10-4	105	A Futile Relocation to an Isolated Station	絶体絶命さいはて署	39-6
10-4	106	Ryo-san Goes to the Moon	両さん月へ行く	58-5
10-4	107	Super-Ouch! The Worst Battle in History	大ハード2! 史上最低の決戦	108-8
10-25	108	I'm the Leading Role! Toden Hoshi	俺が主役だ! 星逃田	17-4; 18-1
11-8	109	Bodyguard Romance	恋のボディーガード	95-3
11-15	110	Asakusa Cinema Paradise	浅草シネマパラダイス	97-6
11-22	111	The Turtle Returns	亀の恩返し	101-3
11-29	112	Transform! The Chief's New Car	変身! 部長の新車	43-3
12-6	113	Bonus Wars 3	ボーナス争奪戦3	Original
12-20	114	Hondara-Sacrificing-ken	ホンダラ身がわり拳	84-9; 70-2
12-27	115	Ryo-san Shrinks!	両さん小さくなる!	43-7
12-27	116	Double-Date Hell	地獄のダブルデート	109-2
12-27	117	Decision of the World's Strongest Woman! B-1 Grand Prix '98: The Great Hong Kong Battle!	世界最強美女決定! B-1グランプリ'98 香港大決戦!!	109-3
12-27	118	Asakusa Tale	浅草物語	57-8
12-27	119	Ryo-san Becomes Invisible	両さん透明人間になる	63-9

=== 1999 ===
Air date	EP#	English title	Japanese title	Manga source
1-17	120	As an Older Brother...!	兄として...!	78-9; 79-4
1-24	121	As a Family Relative...!	身内として...!	78-10
1-31	122	48 Hours Around the World!	48時間世界一周!	91-8
2-7	123	Maria! The Clenched Fists with Love	マリア! 恋する鉄拳	67-7
2-14	124	a counterattack punished jiji	逆襲罰当たりジジィ	44-4; 62-10
2-21	125	Run! Reiko's Great Chase	走れ! 麗子の大追跡	110-2
2-28	126	do not use fire in the world	渡る世間に火気厳禁	23-4
3-7	127	Secret Medicine Ryotsu GPX	秘薬リョーツGPX	70-3
3-14	128	The Honda Family	本田家の一族	Original
3-21	129	my unexpected love	思い過ごしも恋のうち	108-7
4-4	130	face is a source of evil	顔は災いの元?!	58-7
4-4	131	Ryotsu's Ambition! Time-travel to Life in the War Country	両津の野望! タイムスリップ戦国伝	51-3; 51-4
4-4	132	various kind of living things	生き様さまざま	107-7
4-4	133	Detective Newcomer・Ryotsu!	新米刑事・両津!	41-10
4-25	134	Don't Call Me Papa!	パパと呼ばないで!	14-2
5-2	135	Sakonji Sets Off	左近寺新たなる門出	Original
5-9	136	Distant Afterschool	遠い放課後	106-6; 108-4
5-16	137	it's too early for the olympics	五輪にゃまだ早い?	49-7
5-23	138	moero!island of love	萌えろ! 恋のえらぶ島	21-4; 50-9
5-30	139	The Outrageous Sky Police Force	トンデモ航空警察隊	50-2
6-6	140	Tear-Jerking! Terai's First Arrest	感涙! 寺井の初体験	4-1
6-13	141	Ryo-san Becomes a Mangaka	両さん漫画家になる	94-5
6-20	142	fierce fighting kankeri big war	激闘カンケリ大戦争	102-5
6-27	143	Nostra-Ryotsu's Great Prophecy	ノストラ両津大予言	78-7
7-4	144	The Super VHS King	激撮ホームビデオ王	62-3
7-11	145	Nice Kameari Nights	亀有の夜はやさしく	9-2
7-25	146	Showdown! Golf Course Rip-up	決戦! ゴルフ場破り	51-2
8-1	147	Charlie Kobayashi's Secret	チャーリー小林の秘密	8-9
8-8	148	ton demo deep sea sos	トンデモ深海SOS	75-9; 106-9
8-22	149	Work! Matsukichi	働け! 松吉	Original
8-29	150	A Present Blooming in the Sky	夜空に咲いた贈り物	61-5; 112-2
9-12	151	physical strength of ryotsu corp	両津の体力株式会社	60-1
9-19	152	The Forever Laughing Ebisu-kun	笑う門に恵比須くん	42-2; 112-8
10-17	153	fight! trump shimoshigami	戦え! トランプ下克上	105-4; 106-1
10-31	154	Dispatch! Robo-Cops	出動! ロボット警官	35-6
11-21	155	The Great Strad Chase!	ストラディ大追跡!	85-4
12-5	156	SF Aliens Strike Back!	SF宇宙人の逆襲!	下町奮戦記より
12-12	157	Bonus Wars 4	ボーナス争奪戦4	78-1
12-19	158	Freezing Time	時間よとまれ	33-6
12-19	159	Ryo-san Goes to America	両さんアメリカへ行く	26-9
12-19	160	Where is there Paradise	極楽はどこだ	59-10

=== 2000 ===
Air date	EP#	English title	Japanese title	Manga source
1-2	161	Far Away Terai's House	はるかなる寺井家	29-2
1-2	162	Withstanding Calcium	カルシウムで耐えろ	81-6
1-16	163	Fleshy Magicians	肉体派マジシャン	80-2
1-23	164	Komachi's Big Break!?	小町!? 大ブレイク	Original
1-30	165	True Story! V Cameraman	実録! Vカメラマン	76-1
2-6	166	Trip Set-off for Rice and O-Musubi	米とおむすびの旅立ち	82-6
2-13	167	Aah, Life in Hell	あぁ地獄の寄宿生活	40-2
2-20	168	Cellphone Panic!	ケータイパニック!	70-7
2-27	169	Onsen Tour Trip	旅まかせ温泉ツアー	114-3
3-5	170	A Sinobazunoike Memory	不忍池の想い出	98-3
3-12	171	Battle! All-Natural Golf	決戦! 大自然ゴルフ	86-6
3-19	172	Transform! Nakagawa-kun the Citizen	変身! 庶民派中川君	113-1
4-2	173	Trying Again at Life!	人生をやりなおせ!	92-4
4-2	174	The Man With 7 Voices	七色の声をもつ男	77-3
4-2	175	Great Battle of Odorokimononoki-Island	オドロキモモノキ島の大決戦	81-9
4-16	176	The Worst Day of My Life	人生最悪の日	40-9
4-23	177	Romance Crosses Over the Ocean!?	恋は海を越えて!?	29-9; 29-10
4-30	178	Profiting from Anime!	アニメで儲けろ!	97-5
5-7	179	Wings of Friendship	友情の翼	87-4
5-14	180	Hyper-CEO's Family Service	ハイパー社長の家族サービス	85-1
5-28	181	Shame-Suppressing Part-Time Job	恥を忍んでアルバイト	111-1
6-4	182	Behold! Detective Shojo Manga	出た! 少女漫画刑事	116-2
6-11	183	The Time I Forgot the Disaster...	災いは忘れた頃に...	89-8
6-18	184	Ryotsu the Hyper-Cop	ハイパーコップ両津	65-3
7-16	185	Ryo-san Goes for a Health Screening	両さん人間ドックへ行く	54-5
7-30	186	Baseball Stadium Light	光の球場	82-4
8-13	187	Downtown Police Box Diary	下町交番日記	64-1
8-20	188	Straight-On Kendo!	剣道一直線!	43-10; 93-10
8-27	189	Kankichirou's Summer	勘吉郎の夏	Original
9-3	190	Clash! The Charity Bazaar	激突! チャリティバザー	83-2; 114-4
9-10	191	The Hibernating Cop Once Again	冬眠警官ふたたび	81-1
9-17	192	Unexplored! Doinaka Prefecture	秘境! どいなか県	35-4
9-24	193	Circus Symphony	サーカスシンフォニー	109-9
10-1	194	Sky-Flying Taco Delivery	空飛ぶタコ配便	64-6
10-1	195	newspaper boy good luck story	新聞少年勘吉物語	103-7
10-1	196	Big Clash! Ryotsu VS the Crow	大激突! 両津VSカラス	97-2; 118-6
10-1	197	Keiichi & Reiko's Couples Comedy Act	圭一・麗子の夫婦漫才	115-5
10-1	198	Shingo Mama's forced breakfast	慎吾ママの無理やり朝ごはん!	Original
10-22	199	Ryotsu's Taxi Service in Operation	両津タクシー営業中	80-10; 119-6
10-29	200	Run! Kameari Kinguoo	走れ! カメアリキングオー	26-3; 26-4
11-5	201	The Manga Genius Appears	天才画家あらわる	72-6
11-12	202	The Honda Family 2: Eve's Treasure	本田家の一族2イブの宝物	104-8; 116-3
11-19	203	Going After Kameari	追いかけて亀有	40-7; 122-2
11-26	204	Ryo-san Stands for the Election	両さん選挙に立つ	51-5; 55-10
12-3	205	Bonus Wars 5	ボーナス争奪戦5	Original
12-10	206	Outrageous Body-jack	とんでもボディジャック	118-9
12-17	207	Terai, Chase of Persistence	寺井、執念の追跡	7-1
12-24	208	Ryo-san's Greatest Danger! His Rival is a Crackin' Tokyoite	両さん最大の危機! ライバルはチャキチャキ江戸っ娘	118-1; 119-7; 120-4
12-24	209	Cheers for the 21st Century!	21世紀だよ祝い隊参上!	116-8

=== 2001 ===
Air date	EP#	English title	Japanese title	Manga source
1-14	210	This is the East Ginza Kabuki Theatre Police Box	こちら東銀座歌舞伎座前派出所	39-7; 39-8
1-21	211	Wake Up! Ryotsu the All-Serious Human	目覚めよ! まじめ人間両津	49-2; 98-2
1-28	212	The Dancing O-Edo Police Dragnet	踊る大江戸捜査網	122-3
2-4	213	How to Raise a Pet	ペットの飼い方教えます	90-1
2-11	214	The Roady Safety Demon Returns	帰ってきた交通安全の鬼	82-7
2-18	215	Trolley Bus Tale	トロバス物語	114-1
2-25	216	misery sanzan's miserable birthday	悲惨さんざん誕生日	49-4
3-4	217	saintly bridge white line sink	聖橋、白線流し	121-3
3-11	218	To My Loving Older Brother	親愛なる兄貴へ	92-3; 92-7
3-25	219	lullaby of giri & ninjo & human feelings	義理と人情の子守歌	Original
4-22	220	Remove the Graffiti!	落書き消してくれ!	Original
4-29	221	Ryotsu's Town Reconstruction Plan	両津タウン改造計画	87-5; 121−6
5-13	222	The Men Who Steal Ratings	視聴率を盗んだ男	80-3
5-20	223	Ryo-san's Alcohol Ban	両さん禁酒命令	30-10
5-27	224	Super Editing!	超編集（スーパー エディター）	82-2
6-3	225	Ryo-san Becomes a Millionaire	両さん億万長者になる	31-6; 42-9
6-17	226	close adhesion downtown officer	ぶらり密着! 下町警官	42-3
6-24	227	Lemon the Super Kindergarten Kid!	スーパー幼稚園児檸檬!	119-8; 120-8
7-15	228	I Will Teach You the Ways of the Ninja!	忍法おしえます!	82-1
8-12	229	Daddy is a Young Captain!	パパは若大将!	117-6; 122-8
8-19	230	The Bust's Wrath	胸像の怒り	74-4
8-19	231	Reiko's Summer Memory...	麗子、夏の思い出...	122-9
8-26	232	meet at 12th floor	十二階で逢いませう	5-10
9-2	233	100,000,000 Yen Scramble! Giant Athletic Tournament	一億円争奪! 巨大アスレチック大会	76-9
9-9	234	Festival Drums	祭り太鼓	6-4; 61-7
9-16	235	Goodbye Ryo-san	さよなら両さん	Original
10-7	236	yukemori porori 2001 kyoto travel	湯けむりポロリ 2001年京都の旅	Original
10-21	237	decision! ranking king	決定! ランキング王	82-9
10-28	238	Magic Kettle	魔法のヤカン	92-9; 69-3
11-4	239	In Love with Lemon at First Sight	檸檬に一目惚れ	124-6
11-11	240	a wonderful day of super old policeman	スーパー老巡査の素晴らしき一日	27-7
11-18	241	Mr.Tsurupika	つるぴか両さん	55-4
11-25	242	Blow away the vices	悪徳をぶっとばせ	43-2; 79-9
12-2	243	I'm a Voice Actress! Ryoko Kameari	私は女優よ! 亀有両子	Original
12-9	244	The Worst-Ever Escape!	史上最悪の脱出!	Original
12-16	245	Bonus Wars 6	ボーナス争奪戦6	78-1
12-23	246	bottom pull out thief ltd	底ぬけ! どろぼう株式会社	7-8
12-30	247	Fly Out! Christmas	飛び出せ! クリスマス	78-2; 103-2

=== 2002 ===
Air date	EP#	English title	Japanese title	Manga source
1-6	248	across Europe! reiko rescue operation	ヨーロッパ横断! 麗子救出大作戦	103-8
1-13	249	lemon father's visit day off	檸檬の父親参観日	Original
1-20	250	Fly! The Magic Carpet	とべ! 魔法のじゅうたん	47-9
1-27	251	ryotsu pod which call hoax	デマがデマ呼ぶ両津鍋	38-8
2-3	252	Here is the Convenience Store Police Box	こちらコンビニ派出所	121-1
2-10	253	Tonight's the Live Broadcast!?	今夜は生放送!?	72-1
2-17	254	Shrimp! Crab! Squid! Attack of the Great Bio-Organisms	エビ! カニ! イカ! 巨大バイオ生物の襲来	63-2
2-17	255	Colourful Tenants	住人と色	41-5
2-24	256	search without the bear great chase	クマなく探せ大追跡	118-8
3-3	257	miserable birthday again	悲惨さんざん誕生日ふたたび	59-7; 125-6
3-10	258	Kankichi Adventure	冒険カン吉	Original
3-17	259	Hiccup Panic	しゃっくりパニック	Original
3-24	260	The Nice Thief	親切ドロボウ	31-3
4-7	261	let's go nagasaki! dear shigure track sister	レッツゴー長崎! 恋しぐれトラック姉ちゃん	36-6
4-14	262	Ryotsu and Lemon's Kyoto Trip	両津と檸檬京都ふたり旅	125-1; 125-2
4-21	263	Sinking Romance!	恋の大沈没!	111-6; 123-5
4-28	264	Street-Corner Soccer 2002	街角サッカー2002	93-2
5-5	265	The Man with Too Many Keys	鍵をかけすぎた男	20-4; 128-2
5-12	266	3000 miles to visit father of nakagawa	中川の父をたずねて三千里	63-1; 127-3
5-19	267	Ryo-san's Long Day	両さんの長い一日	17-2; 61-2
5-26	268	top secret directive mission five-story pagoda	極秘指令ミッション・イン五重塔	53-10; 86-5
6-2	269	Honda's Shock! Eve's Marriage	本田ショック! 伊歩の結婚	123-6; 123-7
6-9	270	full gratitude! katsushika pro wrestling	満員御礼! 葛飾プロレス	51-6
6-16	271	run terai! stamp rally for dad	走れ寺井! お父さんのためのスタンプラリー	112-9
6-23	272	Dametarou the Robot Cop	ロボット警官ダメ太郎	52-8; 53-8
7-14	273	Behold the Invisible Detective!	透明刑事あらわる!	63-9
7-21	274	Lemon, Becomes an Older Sister	檸檬、おねえちゃんになる	126-1
8-4	275	a man who can eat 300 watermelon in a week	一週間でスイカ300個食べきる男	35-3; 101-7
8-11	276	Itty-Bitty Ryotsu the Fairy?	ちっちゃな両津は妖精さん?	48-8
8-18	277	i will get the swimsuit photos	水着写真をゲットせよ!	116-9
8-25	278	The Police Box Onsen is a Nice Onsen	派出所温泉でイイ湯だな	73-1; 74-10
9-1	279	The Robot Cop who Sets Fire	燃える炎のロボット警官	57-3; 57-4
9-8	280	Ryo-san's Trip Downtown	両さんの下町旅行	47-8
9-15	281	lost work even derail	迷作? ももデレラ	85-3
10-13	282	ryotsu vs ninja armycorps! back edo golden castle legend	両津VS忍者軍団! 裏江戸城黄金伝説	Original
10-20	283	making money with healing system	いやし系で儲けろ!	Original
10-27	284	annoying father imperial palace kawahara	迷惑オヤジ御所河原	37-4; 92-6
11-3	285	fooled kameri and narita	だまされて亀有そして成田	Original
11-10	286	decisive battle! energy saving house	決戦! 省エネハウス	123-8; 129-1
11-17	287	Ryo-san's Dog Life	両さんの犬の生活	129-5
11-24	288	downtown bathhouse picture scroll	下町銭湯絵巻	130-9
12-1	289	ryotsu! top secret report	両津どっきり! マル秘報告!?	30-4
12-8	290	Bonus Wars 7	ボーナス争奪戦7	Original
12-15	291	1 billion yen from gourd	ひょうたんから十億円	56-4; 56-5
12-22	292	fly! shoulder copter	飛べ! ショルダーコプター	62-9
12-29	293	Ryotsu the Giant	両さん大きくなる	Original

=== 2003 ===
Air date	EP#	English title	Japanese title	Manga source
1-5	294	kaiseku family in Hawaiian large panic	擬宝珠家ご一行様INハワイアン大パニック	127-8
1-12	295	spirit preservation party	大和魂保存会!?	16-2
1-19	296	The 12 Faces of Ryotsu	両さんの二十面相	37-2
1-26	297	take back the treasure lottery	宝クジを取りもどせ!	132-1
2-2	298	Angel 7 vs. the Wild Guy Gang	エンジェル7VSワイルド野郎隊	127-2
2-9	299	lemon parenting struggle	檸檬の子育て奮闘記	127-4; 134-4
2-16	300	the man's ambition	男は野望!	59-6
2-23	301	birth of a terrible chick	お雛さんざん誕生	130-7
3-9	302	Ryotsu and Ryotsu!?	両津と両津!?	Original
3-16	303	Here is the Snow Police Box	こちら雪国派出所	13-1; 44-1
3-23	304	Where are We Mr. Denkyoku	ここはどこだよ電極オヤジ	129-6; 130-2
3-30	305	Hacking into Chief Ohara's Game	大原部長ゲームにハマる	92-5
4-6	306	The World's Number One Police Challenge!	世界ナンバーワンポリス決定戦!	Original
4-13	307	prejudiced king of lemon	檸檬の食わず嫌い王	133-5; 133-6
4-20	308	Teacher Kankichi of 3rd Grade Group B	3年B組カンキチ先生	Original
4-27	309	Captain Kankichi Ryotsu	課長両津勘吉	134-1
5-4	310	ryotsu or komachi who reach to goal	両津と小町がゴールイン?	Original
5-11	311	fork in the road of fate	運命の分かれ道	Original
5-18	312	The Last Present	最後のプレゼント	52-6
5-25	313	I'm Reiko and I am Ryo-chan?!	ワシが麗子で私が両ちゃん?!	119-3
6-1	314	Fly! The Flying Ship Team	飛べ! 飛行船隊	134-5
6-8	315	Here is the Kameari Broadcasting Station	こちら亀有放送局	81-8
6-15	316	Atami Octopus Trip	熱海タコ旅行	Original
6-22	317	straying temporary police statiin	迷走! こちら仮派出所	63-7
7-13	318	Ryo-san's Declaration of Love!?	両さん熱愛宣言!?	48-4
7-20	319	asakusa boys gangsters	浅草少年愚連隊	20-6
8-10	320	Hello My Ancestor	ご先祖様こんにちは	58-8
8-17	321	Searing Heat!	猛暑をぶっとばせ!	72-9; 90-7
8-31	322	lemon rather become no ninja	檸檬 くノー忍者になる	81-4
9-14	323	the teacher is a messed up grandpa	先生はハチャメチャ爺さん	70-9一
9-21	324	Who Am I!?	ワシは誰だ!?	Original
10-5	325	bomb train from abashiri to tokyo! ryotsu vs kenko ba	爆走列車! 網走発東京行き! 両津VS拳法バァさん!	Original
10-12	326	koi panic	錦鯉パニック!	120-7; 120-9
10-19	327	The Police Box a Little While Ago	派出所ちょっと昔	Original
10-26	328	orient express theft incident	オリエント急行盗難事件	Original
11-16	329	run! sports festival	走れ! 助っ人運動会	136-8
11-23	330	two person faction police station	二人ぼっちの派出所	53-1; 53-3
11-30	331	clash! station stall war	激突! 駅前屋台戦争	97-8; 130-6
12-14	332	Bonus Wars 8	ボーナス争奪戦8	Original
12-21	333	Super-Stretchy Ryo-san	ゴムゴムの両さん	Original

=== 2004 ===
Air date	EP#	English title	Japanese title	Manga source
1-4	334	ryotsu style manga school	両津流マンガ塾	74-3; 94-5
1-11	335	I Don't Wanna!	だって、やりたくないんだもん!	Original
1-18	336	Ryo-san on the Side of Justice?	正義の味方両さん?	137-7
1-25	337	Naoko's Odd Day	奈緒子の意外な一日	Original
2-1	338	Nakagawa Family Fiasco	中川家お家騒動	Original
2-8	339	ryotsu vs swan bytes big runaway	両津VS白鳥バイト大暴走!	Original
2-15	340	Ryo-san the Honest Person?	正直者両さん?	Original
2-22	341	comedy punishment people	お笑い仕置人	Original
2-29	342	wheel of crew cut that will widen the world	世界に広げよう角刈りの輪!	117-7; 117-8
3-7	343	Operation Recycling	サイクル大作戦	123-3
3-14	344	An All-Girls Police Box	女だらけの派出所	133-4; 133-5
3-21	345	Come Over to the Kameari Shop Street	おいでよ亀有商店街	Original
3-28	346	Special Detectives' Breakdown!? Lemon and the Strange Pirate Gang!	特殊刑事壊滅!? 檸檬と謎の盗賊団!	Original
4-4	347	super kanda sushi goodwill divided confrontation	超神田寿司のれん分け対決	125-5
4-11	348	cherry blossom very blight	さくら大変!?	131-1
4-25	349	Ryotsu's Movie Debut!?	両津、映画デビュー!?	127-6; 131-6
5-2	350	run! ridiculous runaway	激走! 奥の細道	Original
5-9	351	Please Get Some Sleep, Chief	部長は寝ててください	Original
5-23	352	Reiko's Cute Prince	麗子のかわいい王子様	Original
6-6	353	this is a man of strawberry picking	これが男のイチゴ狩り!	136-7
6-13	354	Welcome, Dachou-san!?	ダチョウさん、いらっしゃい!?	134-2
6-20	355	grand! battle shogi (kind of chess)	壮絶! バトル将棋	Original
7-4	356	iron arm ryotsu	鉄腕リョーツ	139-3
8-8	357	visiting higurashi 3000 miles	日暮たずねて三千里	100-9; 123-1
9-5	358	dad is a young camp general	パパはキャンプの若大将	117-6; 138-8
9-12	359	Uninhabited Island Golf	無人島ゴルフ	139-1
9-19	360	The Honda Family Once Again	またまた本田家の一族	137-6
10-3	361	three generations of ryotsu family, in a rare journey to golden township	両津家三代、黄金郷への珍道中!	Original
10-10	362	Lemon on Strike	檸檬のストライキ	140-4
10-31	363	Shapeshift! Before and After	変形! ビフォーアフター	79-6; 138-2
11-7	364	Itty-Bitty Ryo-chan	ちっちゃな両ちゃん	Original
11-14	365	memories of the stalls	屋台の思い出	89-10; 131-8
11-21	366	Dance・Dance・Dance	ダンス・ダンス・ダンス	109-4
11-28	367	invention king ryotsu	発明王リョーツ	135-5; 141-4
12-5	368	Laugh, Forgive	笑ってユルして	139-4; 141-7
12-12	369	Flower-child Ryo-chan!	花の子・両ちゃん!	Original
12-19	370	Fight! Kumawari-kun!	闘え! クマわり君!	Original
12-19	371	Kankichi Ryotsu the Love Warrior	愛戦士・両津勘吉	Original
12-19	372	Operation Goodbye Ryo-san	さよなら両さん大作戦	Original
12-19	373	Last Episode Bonus	最終回おまけ	Original

== Specials ==
Air date	EP#	English title	Japanese title	Manga source
2005; 1-2	374	The Tuna Cop	マグロに乗った警官	80-4; 126-5
3-27	375	ryotsu vs crybaby idol! Japan's no.1 large board game	両津VS泣き虫アイドル!? 日本1周大すごろくゲーム!!	134-9
10-23	376	ryotsu and faithful dog lucky story kameri large encirclement net	両さんと忠犬ラッキー物語 〜亀有大包囲網をかわせ!!〜	Original
2006; 4-2	377	run! ryotsu cheng tin tin train ohara's memories	走れ!両津式チンチン電車 〜思い出の大次郎号〜	Original
9-24	378	ryotsu asakusa renewal blitz memories of hanayashiki amusement park	両津の浅草リニューアル大作戦!! 〜あぁ 思い出の花やしき〜	Original
2007; 8-5; 8-12	379	sea expedition! vows to find white whale of memories in sumidagawa river	シートン探検隊!隅田川の誓い 〜思い出の白い鯨を探せ!〜	Original
9-30; 10-7	380	i do not eat both sushi top tuna confrontation	両さんの寿司食いねえ! 〜頂上マグロ対決!!〜	Original
2008; 4-6; 4-13	381	eagle and me we are asakusa detective boys	ワシと俺!? 〜ぼくらは浅草少年探偵団!〜	Original
2016 9–18	382	Kochira Katsushikaku Kameari Kouenmae Hashutsujo: The Final – Ryoutsu Kakichi Saigo no Hi	こちら葛飾区亀有公園前派出所 THE FINAL 両津勘吉 最後の日	Original
