= Hadashi no Mirai / Kotoba yori Taisetsu na Mono =

"Hadashi no Mirai/Kotoba yori Taisetsu na Mono"

Single by Arashi

from the album Iza, Now!
- Released: September 3, 2003 (Japan)
- Genre: Pop rock; rock
- Length: 27:58
- Label: J Storm

Arashi singles chronology
"Tomadoi Nagara" (2003)	"Hadashi no Mirai/Kotoba yori Taisetsu na Mono" (2003)	"Pikanchi Double" (2004)

"Hadashi no Mirai/Kotoba Yori Taisetsu na Mono" (ハダシの未来/言葉より大切なもの, Barefoot Future/Something More Precious Than Words) is the eleventh single of the Japanese boy band Arashi and their second double A-side single. The single was released in two editions: a regular edition containing the karaoke versions of all the songs released in the single, and a limited edition with a deluxe cover art.

== Single information ==
"Hadashi no Mirai" was used as the campaign song for Coca-Cola and is evident on the cover art design for the limited edition. "Kotoba yori Taisetsu na Mono" was used as the theme song for the drama Stand Up!! starring Arashi member Kazunari Ninomiya, NEWS member Tomohisa Yamashita, Anne Suzuki, Hiroki Narimiya and Shun Oguri.

== Track list ==
No.	Title	Lyrics	Music	Arrangement	Length
1.	"Hadashi no Mirai"	Ayumi Miyazaki	Miyazaki	Chokkaku	4:42
2.	"Kotoba Yori Taisetsu na Mono"	Sho Sakurai; Takeshi	Takehiko Īda	Tomoki Ishizuka	4:04
3.	"Hadashi no Mirai" (instrumental)	Miyazaki	Miyazaki	Chokkaku	4:42
4.	"Kotoba Yori Taisetsu na Mono" (instrumental, limited edition includes hidden talk track)	Sakurai; Takeshi	Īda	Ishizuka	14:30

== Charts and certifications ==
=== Charts ===
Chart (2003)	Peak position
Japan Oricon Weekly Singles Chart	2
Japan Oricon Yearly Singles Chart	37

=== Certifications ===
Country	Provider	Sales	Certification
Japan	RIAJ	140,064	Platinum
