= How's It Going? =

Studio album by Arashi
- Released: July 9, 2003
- Genre: Pop, rock, R&B
- Length: 65:23
- Label: J Storm

Arashi chronology
Here We Go! (2002)	How's It Going? (2003)	Iza, Now! (2004)

Singles from How's It Going?
- 1. "Pikanchi" Released: October 17, 2002; 2. "Tomadoi Nagara" Released: February 13, 2003

How's It Going? is the third studio album by Japanese boy band Arashi. The album was released in Japan on July 9, 2003, under their record label J Storm in two editions: a regular and limited edition, with the latter bearing a different cover art and a booklet. It was released digitally on February 7, 2020.

== Singles ==
The album contains the singles "Tomadoi Nagara", theme song for the drama Yoiko no Mikata starring Sho Sakurai and a new version of "Pikanchi", the theme song for the movie Pikanchi: Life is Hard Dakedo Happy, which all five members of the group co-starred in.

== Track listing ==
No.	Title	Lyrics	Music	Arrangement	Length
1.	"Tomadoi Nagara" (Album version)	Hiroo Ooyagi	Ooyagi	Ooyagi	5:27
2.	"Crazy Ground no Ōsama"	Ma-saya; Sho Sakurai	Hiroaki Ohno	Ohno	4:02
3.	"Lucky Man"	Yukie Ozaki; Sakurai	Takehiko Iida	Naoki Ōtsubo	5:01
4.	"Shinchōsa no Nai Koibito"	Takeshi	Seikō Nakaoka	Nakaoka	6:15
5.	"Only Love"	Makoto Atoji	Ashley Cadell; BJ Caruama; John Collins	Tomoki Ishizuka	4:35
6.	"Arashi no Mae no Shizukesa"	Atoji	Akio Shimizu	Ha-j	4:16
7.	"Blue"	Kōsuke Morimoto	Morimoto	Ha-j	5:38
8.	"Walking in the Rain"	Spin	Brian Hobbs; Jany Schella; Christian Svensson	Jun Abe	3:53
9.	"Palette"	Takeshi; Sakurai	Masayuki Iwata	Iwata	3:52
10.	"Dekirudake"	Takeshi Aida	Morimoto	Ōtsubo	4:40
11.	"Te Agero"	Yōji Kubota	Patrik Liotard	Chokkaku	4:37
12.	"15th Moon"	Kubota	Face 2 Fake	Face 2 Fake	4:11
13.	"Donna Kotoba de"	Makihiko Araki	Araki	Araki	4:05
14.	"Pikanchi" (Album version)	Aida	Shin Tanimoto	Chokkaku	4:50
Total length:					65:23

== Charts and certifications ==
=== Weekly charts ===
Chart (2003)	Peak position
Japan (Oricon Albums Chart)	2

=== Certifications ===
Region	Certification	Certified units/sales
Japan (RIAJ)	Gold	100,000^{^}
^{^} Shipments figures based on certification alone.
