= Hitomi no Naka no Galaxy / Hero =

"Hitomi no Naka no Galaxy/Hero"

Single by Arashi

from the album 5x5 The Best Selection of 2002–2004
- B-side: "Hey Hey Lovin' You"
- Released: August 18, 2004
- Genre: Pop
- Label: J Storm

Arashi singles chronology
"Pikanchi Double" (2004)	"Hitomi no Naka no Galaxy/Hero" (2004)	"Sakura Sake" (2005)

"Hitomi no Naka no Galaxy/Hero" (瞳の中のGalaxy/Hero, Galaxy in Your Eyes/Hero) is the thirteenth single of the Japanese boy band Arashi. The single was released in three editions: a regular edition containing a bonus track and karaoke versions of all the songs released in the single, and two limited editions, both containing a DVD with a music video of one of the A-side tracks. The single is the group's third double A-side single, and all the songs included in the single starts with the letter "H".

== Single Information ==
"Hitomi no Naka no Galaxy" was used as the theme song for the drama Minami-kun no Koibito starring Kyoko Fukada and Arashi member Kazunari Ninomiya, and "Hero" was used as the theme song for NTV's Olympics coverage.

== Track list ==
No.	Title	Lyrics	Music	Arrangement	Length
1.	"Hitomi no Naka no Galaxy"	Fumiya Fujii	Fujii	Chokkaku	5:19
2.	"Hero"	Spin	Shin Tanimoto	Tomoki Ishizuka	4:55
3.	"Hey Hey Lovin' You"	Maria Kuze	Minoru Komorita	Chokkaku	5:19
4.	"Hitomi no Naka no Galaxy" (instrumental)	Fujii	Fujii	Chokkau	5:19
5.	"Hero" (instrumental)	Spin	Tanimoto	Ishizuka	4:55
6.	"Hey Hey Lovin' You" (instrumental)	Kuze	Komorita	Chokkaku	4:48
Total length:					30:06

Limited edition A
No.	Title	Lyrics	Music	Arrangement	Length
1.	"Hitomi no Naka no Galaxy"	Fujii	Fujii	Chokkaku	5:19
2.	"Hero"	Spin	Tanimoto	Ishizuka	4:55
3.	"Hitomi no Naka no Galaxy" (instrumental)	Fujii	Fujii	Chokkaku	5:19

Limited edition B
No.	Title	Lyrics	Music	Arrangement	Length
1.	"Hero"	Spin	Tanimoto	Ishizuka	4:55
2.	"Hitomi no Naka no Galaxy"	Fujii	Fujii	Chokkaku	5:19
3.	"Hero" (instrumental)	Spin	Tanimoto	Ishizuka	4:55

Limited Edition A – DVD
No.	Title	Length
1.	"Hitomi no Naka no Galaxy" (music video)

Limited Edition B – DVD
No.	Title	Length
1.	"Hero" (music video)

== Charts, peaks and certifications ==
=== Charts ===
Chart (2004)	Peak position
Japan Oricon Weekly Singles Chart	1
Japan Oricon Yearly Singles Chart	29

=== Sales and certifications ===
Country	Provider	Sales	Certification
Japan	RIAJ	170,564	Platinum
