= Pikanchi Double =

2004 single by Arashi

Single by Arashi

from the album Iza, Now!
- B-side: "Gori Muchū"
- Released: 18 February 2004
- Genre: Pop; rock
- Length: 31:10
- Label: J Storm
- Songwriters: Spin; Sho Sakurai; Kōsuke Morimoto; Tomoki Ishizuka

Arashi singles chronology
"Hadashi no Mirai/Kotoba Yori Taisetsu na Mono" (2003)	"Pikanchi Double" (2004)	"Hitomi no Naka no Galaxy/Hero" (2004)

"Pikanchi Double" (stylized as PIKA★★NCHI DOUBLE) is the twelfth single of the Japanese boy band Arashi. The single was released on 18 February 2004 in two editions: a regular edition containing the karaoke versions of all the songs released in the single, and a limited edition with a deluxe cover art and a bonus track.

== Single information ==
"Pikanchi Double" was used as the theme song for the direct-to-video movie Pikanchi: Life is Hard Dakara Happy, the sequel to the group's first movie together. The single's typography is also modified to denote it as a sequel, with two glyphs filling a void, instead of a single glyph with a void in the middle as seen in the typography of "Pikanchi".

== Track listing ==
No.	Title	Lyrics	Music	Arrangement	Length
1.	"Pikanchi Double"	Sho Sakurai; Spin	Kōsuke Morimoto	Tomoki Ishizuka	5:07
2.	"Gori Muchū" (五里霧中, "At a Loss")	Sakurai; Yōji Kubota	Hirō Ōyagi	Ha-j	3:35
3.	"Pikanchi Double" (instrumental)	Sakurai; Spin	Morimoto	Ishizuka	5:08
4.	"Gori Muchū" (instrumental, includes hidden talk track)	Sakurai; Kubota	Ōyagi	Ha-j	18:20
Total length:					32:10

Limited edition
No.	Title	Lyrics	Music	Arrangement	Length
1.	"Pikanchi Double"	Sakurai; Spin	Morimoto	Ishizuka	5:07
2.	"Gori Muchū"	Sakurai; Kubota	Ōyagi	Ha-j	3:35
3.	"Michi Double Ver."	Masahiko Kawahara	Yō Tsuji	Tsuji	0:56
4.	"Pikanchi Double" (instrumental)	Sakurai; Spin	Morimoto	Ishizuka	5:08
5.	"Gori Muchū" (instrumental)	Sakurai; Kubota	Ōyagi	Ha-j	3:35

== Charts and certifications ==
=== Charts ===
Chart (2004)	Peak position
Japan Oricon Weekly Singles Chart	1
Japan Oricon Yearly Singles Chart	67

=== Sales and certifications ===
Country	Provider	Sales	Certification
Japan	RIAJ	89,106	Gold
