= Stand Up!! (Japanese TV series) =

- Created by: Arisa Kaneko
- Starring: Kazunari Ninomiya; Tomohisa Yamashita; Anne Suzuki; Hiroki Narimiya; Shun Oguri
- Country of origin: Japan
- No. of episodes: 11

Production
- Running time: 45 min.

Original release
- Network: Tokyo Broadcasting System (TBS)
- Release: July 4 – September 12, 2003

Stand Up!! (スタンドアップ!!, Sutando Appu!!, sometimes stylized as Stand UP!!) is a Japanese television drama which ran weekly for three months in 2003. The drama, which stars Kazunari Ninomiya of Arashi and Tomohisa Yamashita of NEWS, centers on the lives of the last four virgins left in their highschool as they struggle to lose their virginity over their final high school summer vacation. A 6-DVD box set featuring all eleven episodes, as well as six individual volumes, were released in Japan on December 18, 2003.

== Plot ==
The four main characters: Shōhei, Kengo, Hayato and Kōji (from left)

Four schoolboys find themselves the last virgins left at school. During the summer holidays, a girl they knew as children 11 years ago, moves back to the neighborhood. Despite their childhood attraction to her, they realize she is a mere shadow of the "princess" they all thought they knew. This story of summer—love, friendship, school, family, the hypocrisy of adults, complications of life, experience and failure—is set in an everyday shopping district and shows the clumsiness of children who have developed a little later than their peers.

== Setting ==
The story takes place in the Shinagawa ward of Tokyo, although at least one location, namely the school, is actually in Yokohama.

== Main characters ==
Shohei Asai

=== Shōhei Asai (Shō-chan) ===
Shōhei (浅井正平, Asai Shōhei; played by Kazunari Ninomiya), nicknamed Shō-chan, is the main protagonist of the story, and often his thoughts are expressed by narration. He lives with his older sister Yuriko and his parents, who run a drugstore. At the start of the series, he is head over heels in love with one of his temporary teachers, the young Isuzu Mochizuki. His life starts to go crazy when an old childhood friend, Chie Ōwada, decides to visit the four long-time friends and moves into his house.

=== Kengo Iwasaki (Kenken) ===
Kenken (岩崎健吾, Iwasaki Kengo; played by Tomohisa Yamashita) is a railfan, knowing the schedule of all the trains passing through the suburb by heart. He lives with his single mother, Kimiko, who runs a love hotel which she bought with the divorce money. The four boys often hang around there, playing karaoke or evesdropping on the paying customers. Kenken is the only one of the group who, at the beginning of the series, has a girlfriend: Sonoko Fujisawa.

=== Hayato Udagawa (Udayan) ===
Udayan (宇田川隼人, Udagawa Hayato; played by Hiroki Narimiya) is a member of the high school band. He is the one the girls (especially the group of four he calls the Amazones) pick on most, to which is added that his self-confidence is a little lacking, and that he has a certain affection for peeping under girl's skirts. His parents run a grocery store in the shopping district.

=== Kōji Enami (Kō-kun) ===
Kōji (江波功司, Enami Kōji; played by Shun Oguri) is the sports ace of the group. He's on the school soccer team and is known for often letting out his anger that way. When talking to girls he often starts to mumble incomprehensibly, turning down all offers from them. His father, who is also the chairman of the local neighbourhood meetings, runs a small shop.

=== Chie Ōwada (Chie-chan) ===
Chie Ōwada (大和田千絵, Ōwada Chie; played by Anne Suzuki) is the "childhood princess" the 4 friends knew 11 years ago, up until she had to move away with her parents. There was very little contact between her and the boys during the time span, and she seems to hide a dark secret within her. It is later revealed that during her high school year, she had a crush on one of her classmates, but he took advantage of the situation, raped her and threatened to blackmail her. To escape this awkward situation, and the rumors that soon started to spread, she set out on her journey to Togoshi, to meet her old childhood friends.

== Minor characters ==
- Isuzu Mochizuki (望月いすず, Mochizuki Isuzu) – Yumiko Shaku
- Mitsuhiko Kimura (木村光彦, Kimura Mitsuhiko) – Koji Matoba
- Rumiko Sasaki (佐々木留美子, Sasaki Rumiko) – Takako Kato
- Shiho Tominaga (富永志保, Tominaga Shiho) – Rio Matsumoto
- Naoya Kume (久米直哉, Kume Naoya) – Takashi Tsukamoto
- Ellen Kaga (加賀エレン, Kaga Eren) – Becky

=== Staff ===
- Screenplay - Arisa Kaneko
- Producer - Akihito Ishimaru
- Director - Yukihiko Tsutsumi, Arata Katō, et al.
- Planning - Hiroki Ueda
- Music - Audio Highs
- Theme Song - "Kotoba yori Taisetsu na Mono" (言葉より大切なもの) by Arashi

Production

- Line Producer - Ryūji Ichiyama
- Assistant Producer - Tatsuya Ogishima, Masaru Motoyoshi, Kei Sugimura
- Assistant Director - Yūichiro Hirakawa, Masaaki Nando, Masanao Takahashi, Jun Shiozaki, Masaaki Suzuki
- Executive Producer - Shingo Nakagawa
- Chief Producer - Shin'ichi Mikami, 清藤唯靖
- Advanced Production - Ikumi Uematsu, Yoshihiro Inui
- Production Record - Ayako Okudaira, Kosuzu Tanaka
- Program Desk - Michiko Ozawa
- Organization - Masaaki Tsuru

== Episode list ==
| No. | Title | Original release date |
|---|---|---|
| 1 | "The Sex Situation of Seventeen-year-olds" "Jūnanasai no Seijijō" (17歳の性事情) | July 4, 2003 |
| 2 | "Top Secret Stay-over Plan!" "Maruhi Otomari Keikaku!" (㊙お泊まり計画!) | July 11, 2003 |
| 3 | "A Night Without Parents!" "Oyatachi no Inai Yoru!" (親達のいない夜!) | July 18, 2003 |
| 4 | "An Anxious First Time" "Kinchō no Shotaiken!" (緊張の初体験!) | July 25, 2003 |
| 5 | "Finally, Graduation Number One" "Tsui ni Sotsugyō Daiichigō" (ついに卒業第一号) | August 1, 2003 |
| 6 | "Love That Will Likely Be Burned!" "Yakedo Shisō na Koi!" (火傷しそうな恋!) | August 8, 2003 |
| 7 | "Purity vs. Love Celeb" "Junketsu VS Ren'ai Serebu" (純潔 VS 恋愛セレブ) | August 15, 2003 |
| 8 | "Pregnancy Problems of a High-school Student" "Kōkōsei no Ninshin Mondai" (高校生の妊娠問題) | August 22, 2003 |
| 9 | "Love Taken by a Best Friend" "Shinyū ni Obawareta Koi" (親友に奪われた恋) | August 29, 2003 |
| 10 | "Covered in Wounds from the First Time" "Kizudarake no Shotaiken" (傷だらけの初体験) | September 5, 2003 |
| 11 | "Dawn of the Virgins!" "Dōtei no Yoake!" (童貞の夜明け!) | September 12, 2003 |

== Notes ==
- Tomohisa Yamashita, who plays Kengo (Kenken), is a Japanese idol. He is a former member and leader of the popular J-pop group NEWS.
- Kazunari Ninomiya, who plays Shōhei, is a member of the Japanese boy band Arashi, which performed the title song for the series.
- The first episode starts with a fast zoom-in from space to the rooftop of the school in Shinagawa-ku. However, if one compares the scene to a real satellite view of the same area (using, for example, Google Earth), it is clear that, although there actually is a school at exactly that location, it's not the one we see in the opening.
- Hiroki Narimiya, who plays Hayato, and Shun Oguri, who plays Kōji, have both acted with Jun Matsumoto, another member of Arashi, in other famous Japanese dramas; Hiroki Narimiya in Gokusen and Shun Oguri in Gokusen, Hana yori Dango, Hana yori Dango Returns and Smile.
- Stand Up!! has a similar premise to the film American Pie, with four young men struggling to lose their virginity in their final year of high school.
- In Episode 1, when Kengo (Tomohisa Yamashita) orders French Toast in a diner, the chef Hiromi (Gekidan Hitori) insists that the correct name is “Freedom Toast!” This is a reference to an American controversy over France’s opposition to the Iraq War, in which the U.S. Congress officially renamed French Fries and French Toast Freedom Fries and “Freedom Toast” in Congressional cafeterias.
