= Pikanchi =

Single by Arashi

from the album How's It Going?
- B-side: "Michi"
- Released: October 17, 2002
- Genre: Rock; hard rock
- Length: 5:50 (Limited edition); 17:08 (Regular edition)
- Label: J Storm

Arashi singles chronology
"Nice na Kokoroiki" (2002)	"Pikanchi" (2002)	"Tomadoi Nagara" (2003)

"Pikanchi" (stylized as PIKA☆NCHI) is the ninth single of the Japanese boy band Arashi. The single was released in two editions: a regular edition with the song and its instrumental and a limited edition with "Michi" (道, Road), the insert song used throughout the movie, and a deluxe cover.

== Single information ==
Debuting at the top of the charts in 2002, the single was re-released in 2008, along with "Nice na Kokoroiki", and re-entered the Oricon charts. "Pikanchi" was used as the theme song for the movie Pikanchi: Life is Hard Dakedo Happy starring Arashi in their first movie together.

== Track listing ==
No.	Title	Lyrics	Music	Arrangement	Length
1.	"Pikanchi"	Takeshi Aida	Shin Tanimoto	Chokkaku	4:51
2.	"Pikanchi" (instrumental, includes hidden talk track)	Aida	Tanimoto	Chokkaku	12:17

Limited edition
No.	Title	Lyrics	Music	Arrangement	Length
1.	"Pikanchi"	Aida	Tanimoto	Chokkaku	4:52
2.	"Michi" (道, "Road")	Masahiko Kawahara	Yō Tsuji	Tsuji	0:56
3.	"Pikanchi" (instrumental)	Aida	Tanimoto	Chokkaku	4:52
4.	"Michi" (instrumental)	Kawahara	Tsuji	Tsuji	0:56

== Charts ==
Chart (2002)	Peak position
Japan Oricon Weekly Singles Chart	1
Japan Oricon Yearly Singles Chart	75
