= Nice na Kokoroiki =

Single by Arashi

from the album Here We Go!
- Released: April 17, 2002
- Genre: Pop
- Length: 3:58
- Label: J Storm
- Songwriters: Masami Tozawa; Takehiko Īda

Arashi singles chronology
"A Day in Our Life" (2002)	"Nice na Kokoroiki" (2002)	"Pikanchi" (2002)

"Nice na Kokoroiki" (ナイスな心意気) is the eighth single of the Japanese boy band Arashi. The single was released in two editions. While both the regular edition and limited edition contains the song and its instrumental, the two editions differ in covers and sizes: the regular edition being twelve centimeters and the limited edition being 8 centimeters. Both editions also contain a hidden track of a Secret Talk, an audio recording of the group's casual conversations. It was certified gold by the RIAJ for a shipment of 200,000 copies.

== Single information ==
"Nice na Kokoroiki" was used as the eleventh ending theme song for the anime Kochira Katsushika-ku Kameari Kōen-mae Hashutsujo. The single was released with the group's name spelled in katakana (アラシ) instead of kanji (嵐).

== Track listing ==
No.	Title	Lyrics	Music	Arrangement	Length
1.	"Nice na Kokoroiki" (ナイスな心意気, "Nice Spirit")	Masami Tozawa	Takehiko Īda	Tomoki Ishizuka	3:58
2.	"Nice na Kokoroiki" (instrumental)	Tozawa	Īda	Ishizuka	3:58
3.	"Secret Talk" (hidden track)				2:54

== Chart positions ==
Chart (2002)	Peak position
Japan Oricon Weekly Singles Chart	1
Japan Oricon Yearly Singles Chart	47
