= Tomadoi Nagara =

Single by Arashi

from the album How's It Going?
- B-side: "Fuyu no Nioi"
- Released: February 13, 2003
- Genre: Pop
- Length: 43:04
- Label: J Storm

Arashi singles chronology
"Pikanchi" (2002)	"Tomadoi Nagara" (2003)	"Hadashi no Mirai/Kotoba yori Taisetsu na Mono" (2003)

"Tomadoi Nagara" (とまどいながら, While Lost) is the tenth single of the Japanese boy band Arashi. The single was released in 2003 in two editions: a regular edition and a limited edition with a deluxe cover art. Both editions contain the same tracks. The limited edition includes a hidden track, the continuation of the group's Secret Talk from "Pikanchi".

== Single information ==
"Tomadoi Nagara" was used as the theme song for the drama Yoiko no Mikata (よい子の味方, Ally of Good Children) starring Arashi member Sho Sakurai in his first lead role.

== Track listing ==
No.	Title	Lyrics	Music	Arrangement	Length
1.	"Tomadoi Nagara" (とまどいながら, "While Lost")	Hirō Ōyagi	Ōyagi	Ōyagi	4:16
2.	"Fuyu no Nioi" (冬のニオイ, "The Scent of Winter")	Girls Talk	Girls Talk	Tomoki Ishizuka	5:14
3.	"Kimi ga Iinda" (君がいいんだ, "You're the One")	Masami Tozawa; Show	Akio Shimizu	H-Wonder	5:10
4.	"Koigokoro" (コイゴコロ, "Awakening of Love")	Silas Lee	Lee	Jun Abe	5:01
5.	"Tomadoi Nagara" (instrumental)	Ōyagi	Ōyagi	Ōyagi	4:17
6.	"Fuyu no Nioi" (instrumental)	Girls Talk	Girls Talk	Ishizuka	8:57
7.	"Kimi ga Iinda" (instrumental)	Tozawa; Show	Shimizu	H-Wonder	5:11
8.	"Koigokoro" (instrumental)	Lee	Lee	Abe	4:58
Total length:					43:04

Notes

- The limited-edition version of "Fuyu no Nioi (instrumental)" includes a hidden talk track.

== Charts and certifications ==
=== Charts ===
Chart (2003)	Peak position
Japan Oricon Weekly Singles Chart	2
Japan Oricon Yearly Singles Chart	49

=== Certifications ===
Country	Provider	Sales	Certification
Japan	RIAJ	104,140	Gold
