= Kazunari Ninomiya =

Japanese actor and singer (born 1983)

- 二宮 和也
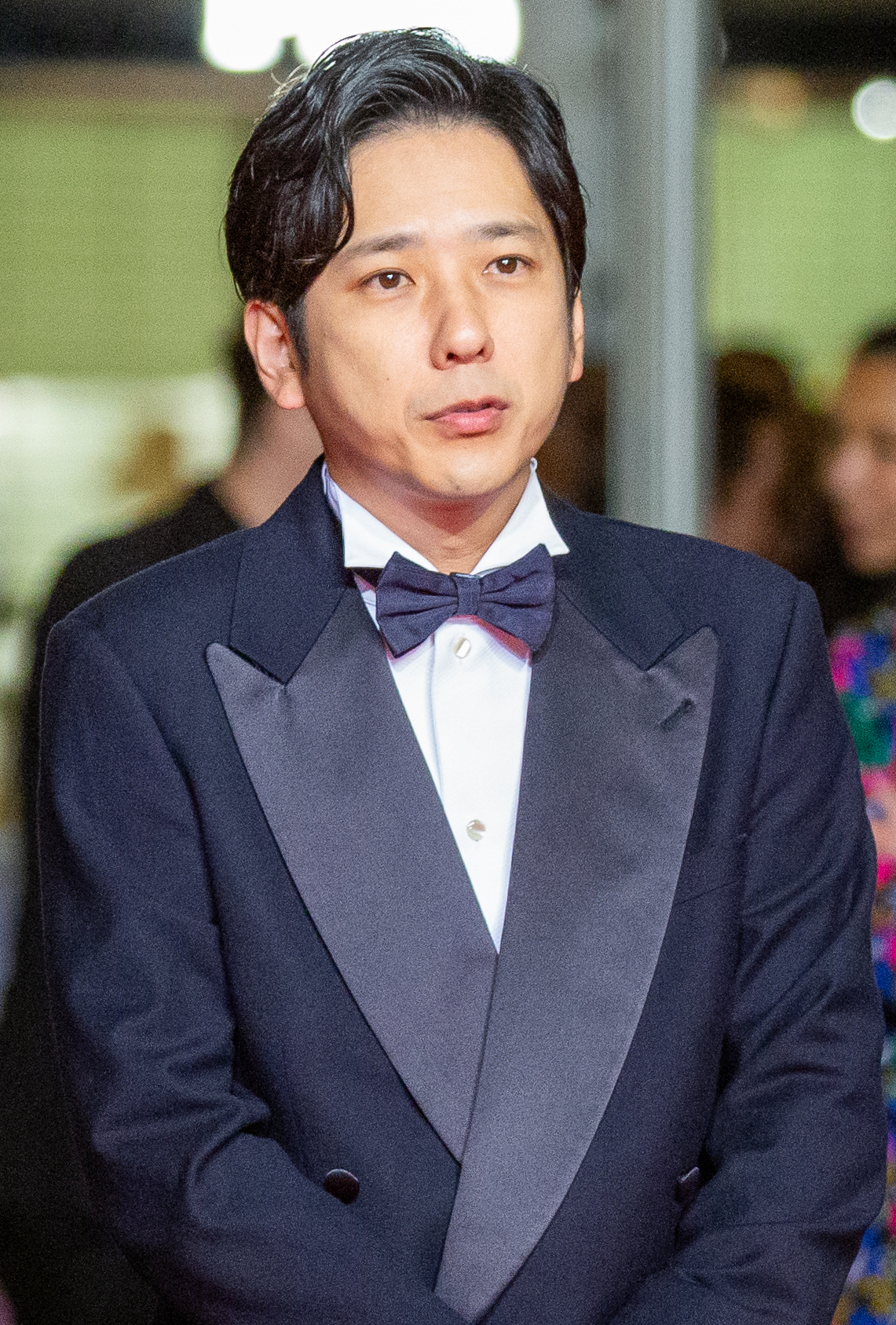
- Ninomiya at the 2025 Cannes Film Festival
- Born: June 17, 1983 (age 43); Katsushika, Tokyo, Japan
- Other name: Nino
- Occupations: Singer; actor; television presenter
- Years active: 1996–present
- Children: 2
- Musical career
- Genre: J-pop
- Instruments: Vocals; guitar; piano
- Labels: Pony Canyon; J Storm
- Formerly of: Arashi
- Website: https://office-nino.co.jp/

Kazunari Ninomiya (二宮 和也, Ninomiya Kazunari; born June 17, 1983), often called Nino (ニノ), is a Japanese singer, songwriter, actor, voice actor, presenter and radio host. He is a former member of the Japanese idol group Arashi (started under Johnny & Associates, later under agent contract with Starto Entertainment), and with which he remained until the group's end of activities. He became independent from the agency in 2023 for individual activities.

== Early life ==
Ninomiya was born in Katsushika, Tokyo as the youngest child of his family; his sister is two years older than he is. His father and mother were both working as chefs at Hattori Nutrition College when they met, his father being a Japanese cuisine teacher, and his mother, his assistant. When Ninomiya was born, his grandfather immediately came home and named him the heir to the family's windshield wiper factory, since he was his grandfather's only grandson.

Ninomiya graduated from high school in March 2002 at the age of 18.

== Career ==
Ninomiya's career began in the entertainment industry when Ninomiya's cousin sent in an application to Johnny & Associates without his knowledge, and his mother's prodding. After attending and passing the auditions, he joined the talent agency in 1996 aged 13.

Prior to his debut with Arashi, Ninomiya started an acting career when he was cast as Chris for the stage play Stand by Me, which was based on the film of the same name. He has starred in numerous television drama, movie and stage production since then, and has been regarded as the actor of Arashi, described as an actor who can act with his mouth and eyes. Ninomiya has won a number of awards and nominations for his roles.

Ninomiya announced he would become independent from the agency on October 24, 2023. Regarding his participation as member of Arashi, he said they would work together when they resume activities.

Nino hosts a variety show for TV Tokyo for the first time (and his first appearance in 26 years), "Geki kawa petto dai shūgō! Wan Nyan Ninoland", which is to air on August 31, 2024. He and his co-host, Shimofuri Myojo's Seiya Ishikawa appear as a CG dog and cat, respectively, in what is said to be "the ultimate pet program that delivers from the perspective of animals"; the concept of the show is a secret gathering in which animals have the main roles.

For 2025, Ninomiya has in mind a fan meeting, which would be his first, planning to visit five locations: Tokyo, Nagoya, Osaka, Hokkaido, and Fukuoka. He would like not only to interact with fans through Q&A sessions, but also perform songs in what he called a "showcase". He also said, "I don't want an all-standing venue. I'm thinking of it with seats in mind...it's just my preference".

After 13 years, it was announced on January 8, 2026, that Ninomiya's crown program on Nippon Television, "Nino san", would end by the end of March, the reason given was the difficulty to adjust the schedule with Arashi's last tour. However, there have been comments on SNS from fans saying that the atmosphere that the program had on Sundays, the day it started, had disappeared, and station officials have stated that as a program on the Golden timeslot, high viewership is required.

For the "Let's Go to the Movie Theater!" executive committee's event "Secret Cinema", taking place on June 25, 2026, Ninomiya was chosen as event ambassador. He was also in charge of selecting the 'One Movie of Life' to be screened on the day of the event. Visitors to the event don't know what film is going to be screened, that includes the one Ninomiya presides over.

Ninomiya appeared as a guest in Kering Japan's Women in Motion talk event held October 27, 2026.

=== Music career ===
==== Music and lyrics ====
In 2004, Ninomiya penned and composed "Konseki" (痕跡) for his solo performance during Arashi's Iza, Now!! tour. Although Arashi's fifth studio album One was the first of their albums to feature solo songs of each member, Ninomiya did not provide lyrics or music for official release until the Time album almost two years later.

In 2007, the group's eighteenth single "Love So Sweet" was released with the limited edition containing the bonus song "Fight Song" (ファイトソング; "Faito Songu"), which was written by Arashi and composed by Ninomiya in 2006 for their variety show G no Arashi. On July 11, 2007, the Time album was released with the limited edition containing solo song of each member. Ninomiya wrote the lyrics to his solo song, "Niji" (虹; "Rainbow"), and played the piano portion of the song throughout Arashi's summer tour. He later reprised the performance throughout Arashi's second Asia Tour in 2008.

In 2008, Ninomiya composed, co-arranged and penned the lyrics for his solo "Gimmick Game". In 2010, Ninomiya also composed, co-arranged and penned the lyrics for his solo "1992*4##111". According to Ninomiya himself, the title is read as "arigatō" (ありがとう, thank you).

==== Solo recordings ====
During Arashi's hiatus, Ninomiya released in 2022 a solo album with his choice of cover songs, on June 17 for the members of Arashi's Fan Club (in CD (+DVD/BR)), and June 20 foro the general public (in digital download and streaming). With this, he became the second member, after Satoshi Ohno, to release a solo work. The album, Marumaru to Ninomiya to (〇〇と二宮と), debuted at the top spot on the Oricon download ranking within a week of its release. A continuation cover album was released on July 1, 2025, on CD (a fan club-exclusive edition and a regular edition), and the streaming and download versions the following day. An official "listening party" took place on July 2 through the Stationhead app.

==== Solo concerts and events ====
On March 5, 2025, Ninomiya announced an event for members of his fan club in the form of his first fan club live talk and mini concert. The event, "Kazunari Ninomiya FC Live Showcase", took place in September and October. Additional information about the event was revealed on July 1, 2025. The musical performance in the event featured songs from his second cover album; the talk part was a "Q and A" session, answering questions sent in by members of the fan club.

=== Acting career ===
==== Stage ====
Ninomiya began his acting career in a 1997 stage play based on the American coming of age film Stand by Me with future bandmates Masaki Aiba and Jun Matsumoto. He did not return to do any major stage productions for nearly seven years after Stand by Me, instead focusing on dramas. However, in 2004, Ninomiya appeared in his first lead role in the stage play Shibuya Kara Tooku Hanarete (シブヤから遠く離れて) directed by Yukio Ninagawa. From April 3, 2005 to May 4, 2005, he took up Rebel Without a Cause, playing the James Dean character Jim Stark.

From July 18, 2009 to August 11, 2009, Ninomiya appeared in his first stage play in four years. He starred as the psychopathic murderer Bruno in Mishiranu Jōkyaku (見知らぬ乗客, Strangers on a Train), which was based on the novel of the same name.

==== Drama ====
In 1998, he made his television debut as a fifteen-year-old runaway in the TBS television movie Amagi Goe (天城越え, Crossing Mt. Amagi). Just a few months before his debut with Arashi, he was given his first lead role in the drama Abunai Hōkago (あぶない放課後, Dangerous After School) with Subaru Shibutani acting as his stepbrother. His schedule became packed, causing him to lose 7 kg in a month as a result. From October 11, 1999 to October 29, 1999, because Arashi were the main supporters for the 8th World Cup of Volleyball Championships, all five members co-starred together for the first time in the volleyball-centered short drama V no Arashi (Vの嵐).

From 2003 to 2005, Ninomiya continued to appear in a wide range of dramas. He played a student who found himself to be one of the last four virgins left at school in the comedy series Stand Up!!, a boyfriend of a girl who mysteriously shrunk into a size of merely sixteen centimeters tall in the romance series Minami-kun no Koibito (南くんの恋人, Minami's Girlfriend) and a young man who accidentally killed his mother and developed an estranged relationship with his father as a result in the human drama series Yasashii Jikan (優しい時間, Affectionate Time)

In 2006, Ninomiya starred in the drama special Sukoshi wa, Ongaeshi ga Dekitakana (少しは、恩返しができたかな, Have I Returned a Bit of My Gratitude?), which was based on the true story of young man diagnosed with Ewing's sarcoma. He went on to appear in two different films for the rest of 2006 before taking up Haikei, Chichiue-sama (拝啓、父上様, Dear Father) on January 11, 2007.

During the summer of 2007, he and fellow Arashi bandmate Sho Sakurai co-starred together in the manga-based comedy drama Yamada Tarō Monogatari. Ninomiya played the title character Tarō Yamada (山田 太郎, Yamada Tarō), an extremely poor student attending a school for the rich. Soon after—whilst juggling rehearsals for Arashi's upcoming concerts—he acted as the lead in the drama special Marathon (マラソン, Marason), which was based on the true story of an autistic young man training to become a marathon runner.

After a year without any acting roles, other than a small guest appearance in bandmate Satoshi Ohno's first lead drama Maō, Ninomiya finally took up the main role in the drama Ryūsei no Kizuna "流星の絆 with Ryo Nishikido and Erika Toda acting as his younger siblings. The three played the children of parents who were murdered long ago by a nameless man. Readers, reporters and critics of the 59th Television Drama Academy Awards panel recognized his role as the oldest vengeful sibling and awarded him Best Actor. His Ryūsei no Kizuna role also earned him an Outstanding Actor nomination in the drama category in the 49th Monte-Carlo Television Festival.

In spring 2009, Ninomiya starred as the lead in the third and final of the TBS kandō (感動, "moving") drama special trilogy Door to Door, with the first and second being Sukoshi wa, Ongaeshi ga Dekitakana and Marathon respectively. The drama special was based on the true story of Bill Porter, an American door-to-door salesman who achieved the highest sales for his company despite suffering from cerebral palsy. His roles in Door to Door and Ryūsei no Kizuna won him the Individual Award in the television category of the 46th Galaxy Awards, a first for a Johnny's talent and the first by an actor in his twenties. Ninomiya began filming for the drama special Tengoku de Kimi ni Aetara (天国で君に逢えたら, If I Can Meet You in Heaven) in April 2009. However, the special, which saw Ninomiya's first time playing a psychiatrist, did not air on television until September 24, 2009.

In January 2010, Ninomiya co-starred with the other members of Arashi in their first drama in nearly ten years in the human suspense drama special Saigo no Yakusoku "最後の約束". Ninomiya portrayed Shūji Yamagiwa (山際 修司, Yamagiwa Shūji), a 27-year-old temporary security center employee who is caught up in a building hijack. On September 20, 2010, he made a guest appearance on the last episode of bandmate Matsumoto and Yūko Takeuchi's getsuku drama Natsu no Koi wa Nijiiro ni Kagayaku (夏の恋は虹色に輝く, Summer Love Shines in Rainbow Colors).

Ninomiya starred in the drama Freeter, Ie o Kau (フリーター、家を買う。, Part-time Worker, Buys a House), his first serial drama since Ryūsei no Kizuna (2008). With Karina as his co-star, Ninomiya portrayed a freeter named Seiji Take (武 誠治, Take Seiji). The drama maintained steady viewership ratings throughout its airing, having an average rating of 17.14% overall.

=== Film ===
In 2002, he made his motion picture debut in Arashi's first movie together, Pikanchi Life Is Hard Dakedo Happy (ピカ☆ンチ Life is HardだけどHappy, Pikanchi Life is Hard But Happy). Ninomiya next took to the screen as Shuichi, a high school student trying to get rid of his abusive stepfather, in the 2003 film The Blue Light with Aya Matsuura as his co-star. In 2004, Arashi came together again to reprise their respective roles for the sequel of Pikanchi Life Is Hard Dakedo Happy, Pikanchi Life Is Hard Dakara Happy (ピカ☆☆ンチ Life is HardだからHappy, Pikanchi Life is Hard Therefore Happy).

2006 proved to be a productive year for Ninomiya as he became the first artist from Johnny's & Associates to debut in Hollywood. He played a reluctant soldier called Saigo in Clint Eastwood's Academy Award-winner Letters from Iwo Jima with Academy Award-nominated actor Ken Watanabe. His performance was praised by many film critics, some of which include RogerEbert.com editor Jim Emerson ("thoroughly winning"), Claudia Puig of USA Today ("also superb"), James Berardinelli ("another performer worth singling out") and Kirk Honeycutt of The Hollywood Reporter ("just terrific"). On January 7, 2007, New York Times film critic A. O. Scott listed Ninomiya as an ideal Oscar candidate for Best Supporting Actor.

On October 24, 2006, a couple months after returning from filming Letters from Iwo Jima in the United States, he debuted as a voice actor, lending his voice to main character Black in the Michael Arias animated film Tekkon Kinkreet.

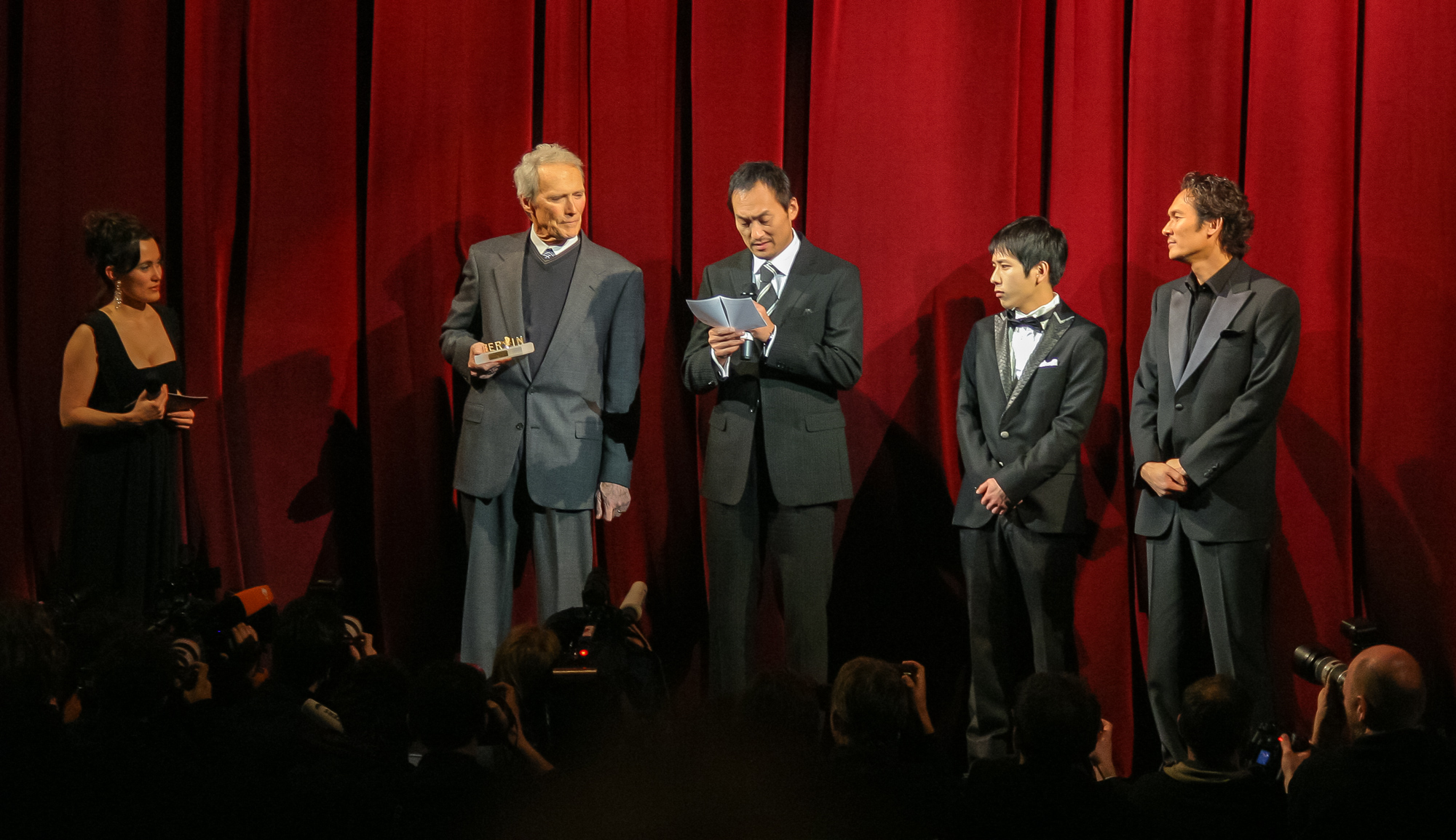
Clint Eastwood, Ken Watanabe, Kazunari Ninomiya and Tsuyoshi Ihara at the Berlin International Film Festival in 2007

In 2007, all the members of Arashi co-starred in their third movie together, Kiiroi Namida (黄色い涙, Yellow Tears), with Ninomiya playing the main role of an aspiring manga artist.

On October 1, 2010, the live-action adaptation of Fumi Yoshinaga's award-winning Ōoku: The Inner Chambers manga, which starred Ninomiya and Kou Shibasaki, was released into theaters in Japan. Ninomiya played Yunoshin Mizuno (水野祐之進, Mizuno Yunoshin), a young man living in a matriarchal society due to a disease that killed most of the male population.

Part one of the live-action adaptation of the manga Gantz, which starred Ninomiya and Kenichi Matsuyama, was released on January 20, 2011 in the United States and on January 29, 2011 in Japan. Ninomiya starred as Kei Kurono, a young man who is hit by a subway train and becomes part of a semi-posthumous "game" with other deceased people. Part two of Gantz, titled Gantz: Perfect Answer, hit theaters in Japan on April 23, 2011.

In 2013, Ninomiya played the lead role in the film adaptation of Keigo Higashino's novel Platina Data, [Platinum Data (プラチナデータ)]. Ninomiya's 2008 drama series Ryūsei no Kizuna [Meteor Bonds (流星の絆)] was also based on a novel by Higashino.

In the 17th issue of Weekly Shounen Jump magazine, it was revealed that Ninomiya would be the voice of Koro-sensei in the 2015 live-action film adaptation of Assassination Classroom.

On 5 March 2016, Ninomiya won the 39th Japanese Academy Award for Best Actor, for his performance in Living with My Mother (Haha to Kuraseba), succeeding fellow Johnny & Associates colleague Okada Junichi.

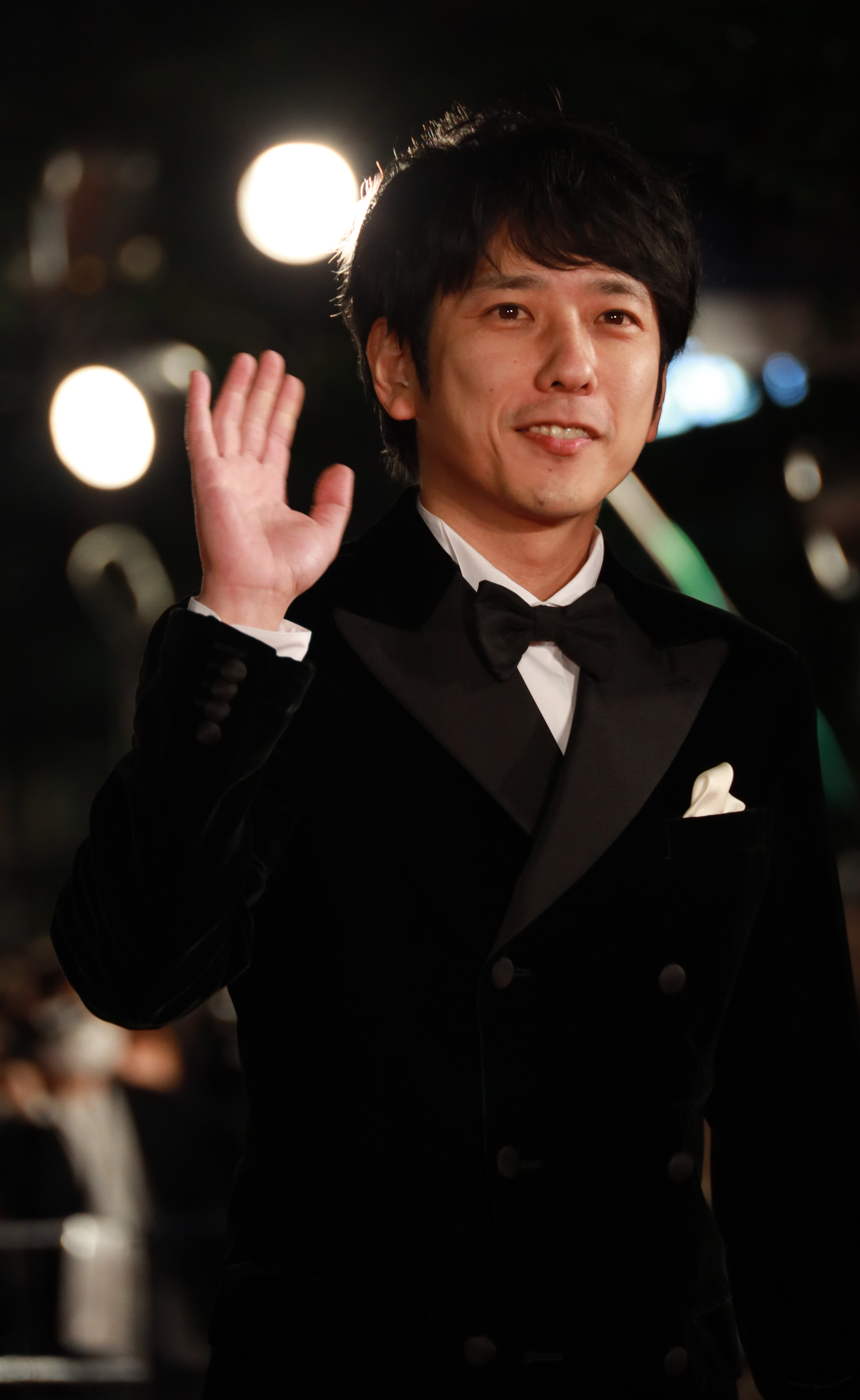
Ninomiya at the 35th Tokyo International Film Festival in 2022

The movie Tang, based on the novel "A robot in the garden" by Deborah Install, in which he plays a failed man abandoned by his wife, who finds an amnesiac stray robot in their garden, was released in theaters around Japan on August 11, 2022. A few days later, it was revealed that Ninomiya played also the role of Tang the robot, after he suggested to the producer, who had been testing with both children and adults for creating its movements without results, that he should also play him as a mirror of his own acting. Tang was made by CG animators using motion capture.

Ninomiya was invited to the 2025 Cannes Film Festival as part of the cast of the movie Exit 8, which was included as a non-competition feature for the midnight screening on May 19, 2025. The film is based on the viral game of the same name created by Kotake Create. Ninomiya plays a man who is trapped in subway corridor with a seemingly endless loop, who has to look out for any anomalies to get out Exit 8.

== Other ventures ==
=== Sports ===
Ninomiya was chosen as a special supporter for the Kobe 2024 World Para Athletics Championships. The event was May 17 to 25.

Ninomiya pitched the first ball for the Chiba Lotte vs Tohoku Rakuten game in Tokyo Dome on July 31, 2025.

Together with Ken Watanabe, event Ambassador, Ninomiya, was chosen as special supporter for the Netflix coverage of the 2026 World Baseball Classic started on March 5, 2026. The pair, in addition to the commentaries on the event, on January 30 released a video on the official Netflix YouTube, and appeared in the documentary "Diamond Truth: The truth about the World Baseball Classic", released as a 4-parter, with the first two episodes streaming on February 19, and the remaining on February 27. Seven of the broadcasts, including the final, were also aired by NTV, with Ninomiya and Watanabe's participation. He also narrated the Netflix documentary "Beyond the game: Samurai 2026 World Baseball Classic (戦いの向こう 侍たちの記録 2026 WORLD BASEBALL CLASSIC)", regarding the Japanese team.

Ninomiya was named special ambassador for the 2026 Asian Games for TBS. When talking about his nomination, Ninomiya said that this was an incredible opportunity. For people like him that didn't know much about the event, getting to know the perspective of sports different of those of the Olympics, imagining the athletes' training and history, and letting children be inspired by the athletes' participating, are reasons for which he wants everyone to see. He also commented that he is happy that he gets to work with members of the "Ninomiya Family", people that he has shared TV programs with. The event is scheduled for September 2026, with Japan hosting after 32 years.

=== Telethon ===
Ninomiya appears as main personality in NTV's 24-Hr TV (24時間テレビ) for 6th time, 5 with Arashi (2004, 2008, 2012, 2013, 2019) and 1 as member of YouTube channel Jyaninochaneru, JNC (2022)

=== Other hosting duties ===
Blue Ribbon Awards (February 2024)

=== Radio ===
Ninomiya has his own radio show, Bay Storm, since October 4, 2002. The show is currently airing every Sunday on Japan's BayFM, in which he often plays his own renditions of Arashi's songs as well as songs by other artists.

=== Writer ===
==== Magazine ====
He wrote a column with the title "IT" in MORE magazine, from January 2009 until it ended in January 2019. On July 7, 2024, he announced to his fan club that he would release, on November 15, the compilation of the 123 issues in the form of a book called "Ninomiya Kazunari no It [itto]". The book contains all photos and written parts included in the More series, with a gift of a special photo bookmark.

==== Books ====
Ninomiya released the book "Dokudan to henken" in June 2025, a book that covers a variety of topics from his point of view. With around 220,000 units sold, the book garnered the top spot in 11 rankings. In the "Oricon Annual Book Ranking 2025," it not only ranked first in the "paperback" category, but also the "celebrity books"; and was included in other rankings, including Tohan/Nippan's "2025 Annual Bestsellers". The full list is as follows:

- "Oricon Annual Book Rankings 2025" (Celebrity Books) (December 2, 2024 – November 24, 2025)
- "Oricon Annual Book Rankings 2025" (Paperback) (December 2, 2024 – November 24, 2025)
- "Da Vinci's "BOOK OF THE YEAR 2025" (Essay, Non-Fiction, and Other" (announced in the January 2026 issue of Da Vinci)
- "Kinokuniya Bookstore Annual Rankings" (Paperback/Educational Paperback)
- "Sanseido Bookstore Annual Rankings" (Paperback)
- "Tsutaya Annual Rankings" (Paperback)
- "Miraiya Bookstore Annual Rankings" (Paperback/Educational Paperback)
- "Rakuten Books Annual Ranking 2025" (Paperback) (January 1, 2025 – October 20, 2025)
- "Tower Records Online 2025 Bestsellers" (paperback) (January 1 – November 30, 2025)
- "Tohan 2025 Annual Bestsellers" (paperback non-fiction) (December 1, 2025)
- "Nippan 2025 Annual Bestsellers" (paperback non-fiction) (December 1, 2025)

=== YouTuber ===
A new Johnny's YouTube channel called ジャにのちゃんねる (Jyaninochaneru), led by Ninomiya himself, was opened in 2021. The channel is also run by KAT-TUN's Yuichi Nakamaru, Hey! Say! JUMP's Ryosuke Yamada, and timelesz's Fuma Kikuchi.
As a consequence of the Johnny Kitagawa sexual abuse scandal, the name "Johnny" was eliminated from all name-related groups, office sections and the office itself. In the video posted on 4 October 2023, named #277【ご報告!!】現状がわかんなすぎて皆で話し合った日, Ninomiya and the rest of the members commented on the change of name for the channel, as well as a pause period to assess all the changes concerning the contracts with the agency's artists. "There are many uncertainties, so we will take a break for a certain period of time", he commented. The channel was to resume with the posts around the beginning of November, but they released a new video saying the channel would take some more time off, until things were settled. After gathering votes for the fan recommended names, the channel's name was changed to "Yoninochannel", as revealed in video #281 【大決定!!】こんな名前が決まるぜ!!!!の日, released December 10, 2023.

He became a VTuber for the latest edition of the Puzzle & Dragons commercials, released in November 2023. According to him, filming this commercial was no different than filming a (CG) movie. It was a challenge for him to get the match play, because of the motion capture suit, but he enjoyed it as a new experience.

=== Social Networks ===
True to his joker nature, Ninomiya opened a Twitter account (@nino_honmono) on March 8 2023, posting only written posts, but in the description, the Johnny's Web profile link he put was that of fellow Johnny and long time friend, Shunsuke Kazama, causing amusement on his followers. He later shared photos of himself alone and with other Johnny's during the 46th Japan Academy Awards Ceremony. Ninomiya caused a stir on 27 February 2024, after posting in X (formerly Twitter) that his head ached. About an hour later, he updated his profile, changing the default photo he had since opening the account, almost 1 year before, to a photo of himself with silver-colored hair. Ninomiya is known to mostly change his hairstyle when he gets acting work.

On May 5, 2025, Ninomiya opened a temporary Instagram account dedicated to promote his upcoming second cover album and fan meeting.

=== Other ===
Ninomiya was part of the production of the movie Exit 8, credited with script cooperation. As a gamer himself, and knowing the game in first hand, Ninomiya reached Kawamura with tips, useful in the moment of turning a non–story game into a story. Ninomiya considered that in a production with many scenes featuring one person, filming does not progress smoothly on set when there are three directions to be taken: director, scriptwriter, and actor. In this particular production, costumes and setting remain the same, creating a loop. "That's why I felt it was necessary to organize things before filming so that there would be a single exit, and so when I was playing this role, I decided to get involved from the scriptwriting stage onwards." he said about his involvement.

== Office Nino ==
After leaving Starto in October 2023, on November 7, 2023, he announced on X (formerly Twitter), that he had established a company. He had announced before that he was making a website along with his sister. In the post in which he announced the company, he also said that "the website is also progressing". Husband of former long-distance runner Akemi Masuda, Yuuji Kiwaki, also participates in operating the newly established company Office Nino, inc. On December 16, 2023, he shared on X the link to his official website. He posted as a description on his profile that he had completed it.

On June 7, 2024, Ninomiya announced the release of "DigiNino", a smartphone app, and the opening of his official fan club, "Office Nino Holdings", both on June 17.

On October 1, 2026, Ninomiya received the first affilliated artist of his agency, Ryo Ryusei.

== Personal life ==
On November 12, 2019, Ninomiya announced his marriage through a handwritten letter he released in their fan club website. He announced the birth of his daughter through his agency on March 5, 2021. The birth of his second daughter was announced on November 19, 2022.

Ninomiya took X as a place to rant about his family's personal space being violated, after a weekly magazine published in November 2024 photos of him and his family in a shrine for the Japanese celebration Shichi-Go-San. The photographs taken only show a mosaic of Ninomiya's wife and children. In response to this, he said, "I've had a life where I told myself, 'I don't want my private life to be photographed, but I can't help it'. In recent years, even when looking at photos taken without permission from an etiquette and moral point of view, I've thought "it's not right to take photos of ordinary people and post them on the Internet where an unspecified number of people can see them" (although this is my opinion). I think that the publisher and the photographer probably blurred them with the intention of 'consideration', but, please do not photograph my family members, who are ordinary people, regardless of the occasion or reason." The post was made on the eve of Arashi's 25th Anniversary, and it was noted by him, as he said that he would stop posting on X for an undisclosed period, given his unwillingness to offend his (and Arashi's) fans because of his "negative feelings".

== Commercials ==
CM

- AC Japan
  - United Nations World Food Program Assistance Campaign "Biscuits" (Narration) (2007-2008)
- Adastria
  - .ST (Dot ST) Clothing (2021- )
- Amazon
  - Prime Video Japan
- Asahi Group Holdings, Ltd.
  - Wonda Coffee (2022) With KAT-TUN'S Yuichi Nakamaru
  - Clear Asahi beer (April 2023) As part of Jyaninochannel
- Nihon Eisai Co. Ltd.
  - Chocola BB (2010-2012)
- DHC Corporation (corporate ambassador) (January 2025 - )
  - DHC Medicated Deep Cleansing Oil Renewbright (2025-)
- Every, Inc. (2017-2018)
  - Delish Kitchen
- Ezaki Glico Co., Ltd.
  - Pocky (2011-2015)
- GungHo Online Entertainment
  - Puzzle & Dragons (2014-2020 as part of Arashi; 2021-2023, 2024- as himself)
- Hisamitsu Pharmaceutical
  - Salonpas (2013-2023)
- House Foods
  - Shirataki noodle soup with soy milk (2007-2011)
  - Soup de okoge (2007-2011)
- Ito Ham
  - The GRAND Alt Bayern Sausages (2021-2023)
- Japan Post Holdings
  - New Year's Day campaign (2007-2008)
- J Storm
  - Hey! Say! JUMP's Ultra Music Power cm (2007)
- JCB
  - JCB Card (2010-2023, April 2024-)
- Kirin Company, Ltd
  - Kirin Beverage Company, Ltd
    - Shavadava (2008)
- Lion Corporation
  - Top Super NANOX (2016-2023); 2021 with fellow Arashi member Masaki Aiba, in a collaborative visual campaign with Soflan
- Lotte Japan
  - Xylitol gum
- Luup, Inc.
  - Luup micro mobility services (E-scooter) (2024- )
- Marugame Seimen
  - Marugame Niku Karamase Udon (2026) with Masahiro Matsuoka
- Megmilk Snow Brand
  - Gasseri SP strain yogurt
- Mercari
  - Mercari Hallo (2024-)
- Morinaga & Company
  - Morinaga Milk Industry pino eskimo (1998-2000)
- NEXT (Lifull) Real Estate
  - HOME'S (2015-2016)
- Nintendo Co., Ltd.
  - Super Mario 3D Land (2011)
- Nisshin Oillio Group ja
  - Nisshin Oillio (2011-2023)
- Nomura Real Estate Solutions Co., Ltd.
  - Nomura Brokerage+ (plus) (2026–) brand ambassador
- NTT, Inc.
  - NTT Docomo's Ahamo (2026–) with Kento Kaku
- Procter & Gamble Japan
  - Pantene (2025-)
- Sapporo Breweries
  - Sapporo Mugi to Hop (2018)
- Suntory Holdings Japan
  - "Kodawari sakaba" (Lemon sour, Takohai) (2026–)

== Filmography ==
=== Television ===
==== Drama ====
Year	Title	Role	Notes	Ref.
1998	Amagi Goe	Takichi Nishinōra (child)	Television special	
1998	Nijuroku ya Mairi	Akimasa Okita (child)		
1998	Akimahende	Taiki Aoki		
1998	Boys Be... Jr.		Episode 6 (appears at the beginning of the episode)	
1999	Nekketsu Ren'ai-dō	Toshiya Kondō	Episode: "Case 1: Iteza no O-gata BOY"	
1999	Abunai Houkago	Katsuyuki Natsuki	Lead role	
1999	Kowai Nichiyōbi	Kazunari Ninomiya	Episode: "Koko Datta ka"	
1999	V no Arashi	Kazunari Ninomiya	Lead role with Arashi members	
2000	Namida o Fuite	Kenta Fuchigami		
2001	Handoku!!!	Nobu Sakaguchi		
2003	Netsuretsu Teki Chūka Hanten	Kenta Nanami		
2003	Stand Up!!	Shōhei Asai	Lead role with Anne Suzuki	
2004	Minami-kun no Koibito	Susumu Minami	Lead role with Kyoko Fukada	
2005	Yasashii Jikan	Takuro Wakui	Lead role with Masami Nagasawa and Akira Terao	
2006	Sukoshi wa, Ongaeshi ga Dekitakana	Kazunori Kitahara	Lead role, television special	
2007	Haikei, Chichiue-sama	Ippei Tahara	Lead role	
2007	Marathon	Shōtaro Miyata	Lead role, television special	
2007	Yamada Tarō Monogatari	Taro Yamada	Lead role with Sho Sakurai	
2008	Maō	Masayoshi Kumada	Episode 1 guest appearance	
2008	Ryūsei no Kizuna	Kōichi Ariake	Lead role	
2009	Door to Door	Hideo Kurasawa	Lead role, television special	
2009	Tengoku de Kimi ni Aetara	Junichi Nonogami	Lead role with Mao Inoue, television special	
2010	Saigo no Yakusoku	Shūji Yamagiwa	Lead role with Arashi members, television special	
2010	Natsu no Koi wa Nijiiro ni Kagayaku	Hamlet stage lighting technician	Episode 10 guest appearance	
2010	Freeter, Ie o Kau	Seiji Take	Lead role	
2011	Freeter, Ie o Kau SP	Seiji Take	Lead role	
2012	Kuruma Isu de Boku wa Sora wo Tobu	Hasebe Yasuyuki	Lead role, 24 Hour Television SP	
2014	Yowakutemo Katemasu	Aoshi Tamo	Lead role	
2015	Murder on the Orient Express	Heita Makuuchi	Television special	
2015	Aka Medaka	Danshun Tatekawa	Lead role	
2016	Botchan	Botchan	Lead role; television special	
2018	Black Forceps	Seishiro Tokai	Lead role	
2022	Adventure of Comandante Cappellini	Yōhei Hayami	Lead role, television special	
2022	My Family	Haruto Naruzawa	Lead role	
2023	One Day: Wonderful Christmas Ado	Seiji Suguroji / Yuta Amagi	Lead role	
2023	Vivant	Nokor		
2024	Black Forceps Season 2	Yukihiko Amagi	Lead role	
2024	Black Forceps Season 2	Seishiro Tokai		
2024	Informa	Takano Ryunosuke		
2024	Oshi no Ko	Kamiki Hikaru	Episodes 7 and 8	
2025	Anpan	Kiyoshi Yanai	Asadora	
2025	Last Samurai Standing (Ikusagami)	Enju		

==== Variety programs ====
Year	Title	Role	Notes	Ref.
2013–2026	Nino san	Host	Initially, on Friday midnights, moved to Sunday midday (October 2013, half hour), changed airing hour (April 2020, Sunday 10:25, 1 hour), changed day (October 2024, Friday 19:00). Scheduled to end by the end of March 2026. Nino san to asobo (Nino san travel specials, 6 as of June 2025) (NTV, January 16, 2023 - June 6, 2025)	
2017–	Ninomiyanchi	Host	Special New Year's program (substituting Aratsubo, hosted by Arashi every January 3, since 2017) (Fuji TV, January 3, 2021-2026); mid–year primetime special (June 27, 2024)	
2024	Dareka to Nakai	co-host	with Masahiro Nakai (Fuji TV, 4 February, 2024-March 2024)	
2024	Friday Edge Quiz ōi kata ga kachi!	Host	(NTV, April - May 2024)	
2024	Kawashima Ninomiya no Tamigoe	co-host	with Akira Kawashima (Fuji TV, May 25, 2024 - November 9, 2024)	
2024	Ninomiya Kotaro	co-host	with Kotaro Koizumi (Fuji, July 2024)	
2024	Geki ka wa petto dai shūgō! Wan Nyan Ninoland	co-host	Shimofuri Myojo's Seiya Ishikawa, narrated by Jin Katagiri and Moka Kamishiraishi) (TV Tokyo, August 2024)	
2024	Nittere-kei Quiz Festival 2024 (aki)	Host	(NTV, October 2024)	
2024–	Nino nanoni	Host	Started as a special (TBS, November 27, 2024), "New Year's special" (January 12, 2025), 3rd. special (March 12, 2025), became a regular program on April 9, 2025.	
2025–	Secret NG House	co-host	with Masayasu Wakabayashi (Prime Video Japan, March 2025 (season 1), May 2026 (season 2))	
2025	Everyone's Best Kouhaku 100th Anniversary of Broadcasting Special	guest	On–studio commentary about the program's history (NHK, 2025)	
2025–	Ninochoco Match	co-host	with Chocolate Planet (TBS, 2025)	
2026	Quiz $ Millionaire	Host	New Year's special (Fuji TV, 2026)	
2026	Friday Mystery Club (金曜ミステリークラブ, Kin'yō misuterīkurabu)	Host	with Chidori's Nobu (NTV, 2026)	
2026	NTV Quiz Festival 2026	MC	with Kiyotaka Nanbara (NTV, 2026)	

==== Music programs ====
Year	Title	Role	Notes	Ref
2025	Music Gift 2025 ~Anata ni okurou kibō no uta~	Host		
2026	NHK Natsu no Ongaku Matsuri ~ Uta de aetara 2026	Host		

=== Animation ===
Year	Title	Role	Notes	Ref
2006	Tekkon Kinkreet	Black	Voice, lead role	
2025	Synapusyu THE MOVIE Pushu Hoppe Dancing PARTY	Party	Voice	
2026	Oshirimae Man ~fukkatsu no oshirimae teikoku~	Oshirimae Legend	Voice	

=== Films ===
Year	Title	Role	Notes	Ref
2002	Pikanchi Life is Hard Dakedo Happy	Takuma Onda		
2003	The Blue Light	Shuichi Kushimori	Lead role	
2004	Pikanchi Life Is Hard Dakara Happy	Takuma Onda		
2006	Letters from Iwo Jima	Saigo	Lead role with Ken Watanabe, Hollywood debut	
2007	Kiiroi Namida	Eisuke Muraoka	Lead role with Arashi members	
2009	Heaven's Door	Host	Guest appearance	
2010	Ōoku	Yunoshin Mizuno	Lead role with Kou Shibasaki	
2011	Gantz	Kei Kurono	Lead role with Kenichi Matsuyama	
2011	Gantz: Perfect Answer	Kei Kurono	Lead role with Kenichi Matsuyama	
2013	Platinum Data	Ryuhei Kagura/ Ryu	Lead role	
2014	Pikanchi Life is Hard Tabun Happy	Takuma Onda	Lead role with Arashi members	
2015	Assassination Classroom	Koro-sensei	Lead role, voice	
2015	Nagasaki: Memories of My Son	Koji Fukuhara	Lead role	
2016	Assassination Classroom: Graduation	Koro-sensei, Grim Reaper	Lead role, voice	
2017	The Last Recipe	Sasaki	Lead role	
2018	Killing for the Prosecution	Keiichiro Okino	Lead role with Takuya Kimura	
2020	The Asadas	Masashi Asada	Lead role	
2022	Tang and Me	Ken Kasugai	Lead role	
2022	Tang and Me	Tang	Voice, Motion capture model	
2022	Fragments of the Last Will	Hatao Yamamoto	Lead role	
2023	Analog	Satoru Mizushima	Lead role	
2024	Oshi no Ko: The Final Act	Hikaru Kamiki		
2025	Exit 8	Lost Man	Lead role	
2025	Shinso wo ohanashi shimasu	Voice on the phone	Voice	
2026	Vivant: The Movie	Nokor		

=== Documentaries ===
Year	Title	Role	Notes	Ref.
2026	Dokyumento 20 min. Shashin-ka Asada Masashi “Kazoku no 15-nen” o toru	Narrator		
2026	Diamond Truth: The truth about the World Baseball Classic	Special commentator		
2026	Beyond the game: Samurai 2026 World Baseball Classic	Narrator		

== Other ==
=== Web ===
Year	Title	Role	Notes	Ref.
2026	"The Open Call" audition project	himself	project guest judge	

== Stage ==
Year	Title	Role	Notes	Ref
1997	Stand By Me	Chris		
1997	Kyo to Kyo			
2004	Shibuya Kara Tooku Hanarete	Naoya	Lead role	
2005	Rebel Without a Cause	Jim Stark	Lead role	
2009	Strangers on a Train	Bruno	Lead role	

== Discography ==
=== Music contributions ===
Year	Title	Type	Ref
2002	Regress of Progress [ja]	lyrics	
2007	Fight song	music	
2007	Niji	lyrics	
2008	Gimmick game	lyrics, music, arrangement	
2009	"5x10"	lyrics (Arashi)	
2010	1992＊4##111	lyrics, music, arrangement	
2011	Doko ni demo aru uta	lyrics, music, arrangement	
2012	Sketch† Green††	lyrics and arrangement (w/Sho Sakurai), music† lyrics (Arashi)††	
2012	Sore wa yappari kimi deshita	lyrics, arrangement	
2013	20825日目の曲	lyrics, music, arrangement	
2014	Merry Christmas	lyrics, music, arrangement	
2016	Wonder-Love	(recording under Ninomiya's supervision)	
2019	"5x20"	lyrics (Arashi)	

=== Solo album ===
Year	Title	Release details	Tracklist	Ref
2022	〇〇と二宮と (Marumaru to Ninomiya to)	Released in CD (+ DVD/BR) for members of Arashi's Fan Club on June 17, digital download and streaming on June 20 for the general audience.	8-song cover album Tracklist: 1. "Kimi to Boku no Banka" (original: Sakai Yu); 2. "Walking with You" (original: Novelbright); 3. "Pretender" (original: Official Hige Dandism); 4. "Himawari no Yakusoku" (original: Motohiro Hata); 5. "Attitude" (original: Mrs. Green Apple); 6. "Omouta" (original: Kiyosaku (Uezu) (Mongol800)); 7. "Rōka o Hashiru na" (original: Natsuko Nisshoku); 8. "Honeybeat" (original: V6)	
2025	〇〇と二宮と2 (Marumaru to Ninomiya to 2)	CD (limited version with extras for fan club members; regular edition with sticker) release July 1, 2025; streaming and digital download release on July 2, 2025	9-song cover album Tracklist: 1. "Answer" (original: Lilas Ikuta); 2. "Isekai Kyōsōkyoku" (original: Kentaro Seino); 3. "Shūmatsu no Māchi" (original: Ryo Umekawa); 4. "Nazonazo" (original: Radwimps; 5. "Bara to Rōzu" (original: Sakai Yu); 6. "Piasu" (original: Satou.）; 7. "Mirai Hana" (original: Sukima Switch); 8. "Last Song" (original: Official Hige Dandism); 9. "Yozora Nomukō" (original: SMAP) (fan club edition exclusive)	
2026	Me Then/Who I am	CD (limited version with extras for fan club members; regular edition} release date: December 16, 2026	10-song self–cover album Tracklist: 1. "Niji (虹)"; 2. "Gimmick Game"; 3. "1992*4##111"; 4. "Doko ni demo aru uta (どこにでもある唄。)"; 5. "Sore wa Yappari Kimi Deshita (それはやっぱり君でした)"; 6. "20825-Nichi-me no Kyoku (20825 日目の曲)'; 7. "Merry Christmas (メリークリスマス)"; 8. "Mata Kyou to Onaji Asa ga Kuru (また今日と同じ明日が来る)"; 9. "Ano Yume wo Nazotte (あの夢をなぞって) (original: Yo Asobi); 10. "Me Then/Who I am" (new song) (fan club edition exclusive)	

=== Other Songs ===
- "Oshiri ga mae ni arishi kimi" (2026) (from movie Oshirimae Man ~fukkatsu no oshirimae teikoku~)

== Solo concerts and events ==
Year	Title	Details	Notes	Ref
2025	"Kazunari Ninomiya FC Live Showcase"	Okaya Koki Nagoya Public Hall Large Hall (Nagoya City Public Hall) (September 2-3, 2025); Fukuoka Sun Palace Hotel & Hall (September 9-10, 2025); Hokkaido Sapporo Cultural Arts Theater Hitaru (September 16-17, 2025); Grand Cube Osaka Main Hall (Osaka Prefectural International Convention Center) (September 25-26, 2025); Tokyo Garden Theater (October 1-2, 2025)	First fan club event	

== Awards and nominations ==
Year	Organization	Award	Work	Result
2001	5th Nikkan Sports Drama Grand Prix (Fall)	Best Supporting Actor	Handoku!!!	Won
2003	6th Nikkan Sports Drama Grand Prix (Winter)	Best Supporting Actor	Netsuretsu Teki Chuka Hanten	Won
2003	10th Rendora 110Award	Best Actor	Stand Up!!	Won
2004	8th Nikkan Sports Drama Grand Prix (Summer)	Best Supporting Actor	Minami-kun no Koibito	Won
2005	60th Japan Broadcast Film Arts Award	Outstanding Supporting Actor	Yasashii Jikan	Won
2005	8th Nikkan Sports Drama Grand Prix (Winter)	Best Supporting Actor	Yasashii Jikan	Nominated
2005	16th Rendora 110Award	Best Supporting Actor	Yasashii Jikan	Won
2006	61st Japan Broadcast Film Arts Award	Outstanding Supporting Actor	Sukoshi wa, Ongaeshi ga Dekitakana	Won
2006	15th Hashida Awards	Individual Award	Sukoshi wa, Ongaeshi ga Dekitakana	Won
2007	10th Nikkan Sports Drama Grand Prix (Winter)	Best Actor	Haikei, Chichiue-sama	Won
2007	10th Nikkan Sports Drama Grand Prix	Best Actor	Haikei, Chichiue-sama	Won
2007	52nd Television Drama Academy Awards	Best Actor	Haikei, Chichiue-sama	Nominated
2007	62nd Japan Broadcast Film Arts Award	Excellence Best Actor	Haikei, Chichiue-sama	Won
2007	11th Nikkan Sports Drama Grand Prix (Summer)	Best Actor	Yamada Tarō Monogatari	Won
2007	54th Television Drama Academy Awards	Best Actor	Yamada Tarō Monogatari	Nominated
2007	Monthly Galaxy Awards (September)	Galaxy Award	Marathon	Won
2007	62nd Cultural Affairs Award	Hōsō Kojin Award	Marathon	Won
2008	12th Nikkan Sports Drama Grand Prix (Fall)	Best Actor	Ryūsei no Kizuna	Won
2008	63rd Japan Broadcast Film Arts Award	Outstanding Lead Actor	Ryūsei no Kizuna	Won
2008	59th Television Drama Academy Awards	Best Actor	Ryūsei no Kizuna	Won
2008	49th Monte-Carlo Television Festival	Outstanding Actor (Drama)	Ryūsei no Kizuna	Nominated
2009	46th Galaxy Awards	Individual Award	Ryūsei no Kizuna, Door to Door	Won
2011	14th Nikkan Sports Drama Grand Prix (Fall)	Best Actor	Freeter, Ie o Kau	Won
2011	65th Japan Broadcast Film Award	Outstanding Lead Actor	Freeter, Ie o Kau	Won
2011	67th Television Drama Academy Awards	Best Actor	Freeter, Ie o Kau	Won
2011	4th International Drama Festival in Tokyo	Individual Award	Freeter, Ie o Kau	Won
2011	4th International Drama Festival in Tokyo	Best Actor Award	Freeter, Ie o Kau	Won
2016	89th Kinema Junpo Award	Best Actor	Haha to Kuraseba	Won
2016	39th Japan Academy Film Prize	Best Actor	Haha to Kuraseba	Won
2016	41st Hochi Film Award	Best Actor	Haha to Kuraseba	Nominated
2017	42nd Hochi Film Award	Best Actor	The Last Recipe	Nominated
2018	22nd Nikkan Sports Drama Grand Prix (Spring)	Best Actor	Black Forceps	Won
2018	97th Television Drama Academy Awards	Best Actor	Black Forceps	Nominated
2018	43rd Hochi Film Award	Best Supporting Actor	Killing for the Prosecution	Won
2019	73rd Mainichi Film Awards	Best Supporting Actor	Killing for the Prosecution	Nominated
2019	61st Blue Ribbon Awards	Best Supporting Actor	Killing for the Prosecution	Nominated
2019	42nd Japan Academy Prize	Best Supporting Actor	Killing for the Prosecution	Nominated
2021	42nd Yokohama Film Festival	Best Actor	The Asadas	Won
2021	63rd Blue Ribbon Awards	Best Actor	The Asadas	Nominated
2021	44th Japan Academy Film Prize	Best Actor	The Asadas	Nominated
2023	46th Japan Academy Film Prize	Best Actor	Fragments of the Last Will	Nominated
2023	65th Blue Ribbon Awards	Best Actor	Fragments of the Last Will and Tang and Me	Won
2023	36th Nikkan Sports Film Awards	Best Actor	Fragments of the Last Will and Analog	Nominated
2023	48th Hochi Film Awards	Best Actor	Fragments of the Last Will and Analog	Nominated
2026	Critics' Choice Super Awards	Best Actor in a Superhero Movie	Exit 8	Nominated

=== Other awards ===
Year	Organization	Award	Category	Result	Ref
2024	Nikkei Magazine	Suits of the Year 2024	Arts and Culture	Won	

== Books and other writing ==
=== Books ===
- Ninomiya Kazunari no It (Itto) (二宮和也のIt [一途]) (ISBN 408789018X, publishing by Shueisha) (November 15, 2024) – Compilation of articles written in "More" magazine. First edition includes a signed photograph bookmark as gift.
- Dokudan to henken (独断と偏見) (Shueisha, ISBN：978-4-08-721368-3) (June 17, 2025) – Original work.

=== Script works ===
- "Exit 8" movie (2025) – script co-writer
