= Nikkan Sports Film Award for Best Actress =

Annual Japanese film award

- Awarded for: Best Performance by an Actress
- Country: Japan
- Presented by: Nikkan Sports
- First award: 1988
- Website: www.nikkansports.com/entertainment/award/ns-cinema/top-ns-cinema.html

The Nikkan Sports Film Award for Best Actress is an award given at the Nikkan Sports Film Award.

== List of winners ==
No.	Year	Actress	Film(s)
1	1988	Sayuri Yoshinaga	A Chaos of Flowers
2	1989	Yukiyo Toake	Harasu no Ita Hibi; Shaso
3	1990	Keiko Matsuzaka	The Sting of Death
4	1991	Sachiko Murase	Rhapsody in August
5	1992	Yoshiko Mita	Tōki Rakujitsu
6	1993	Shima Iwashita	Shin Gokudō no Tsumatachi Kakugo Shīya
7	1994	Saki Takaoka	Crest of Betrayal
8	1995	Haruko Sugimura	A Last Note
9	1996	Ruriko Asaoka	Tora-san to the Rescue
10	1997	Hitomi Kuroki	Lost Paradise
11	1998	Shinobu Otake	Gakko III
12	1999	Sumiko Fuji	The Geisha House
13	2000	Sayuri Yoshinaga	Nagasaki Burabura Bushi
14	2001	Keiko Kishi	Kāchan
15	2002	Kyōka Suzuki	Ryōma no Tsuma to Sono Otto to Aijin
16	2003	Shinobu Terajima	Akame 48 Waterfalls
17	2004	Koyuki	Warau Iemon
18	2005	Kyōko Koizumi	Hanging Garden
19	2006	Yasuko Matsuyuki	Hula Girls
20	2007	Yūko Takeuchi	Side Car ni Inu
21	2008	Haruka Ayase	Ichi; My Girlfriend Is a Cyborg
22	2009	Takako Matsu	Villon's Wife
23	2010	Eri Fukatsu	Villain
24	2011	Aoi Miyazaki	Tsure ga Utsu ni Narimashite; Kamisama no Karute
25	2012	Sayuri Yoshinaga	Kita no Kanariatachi
26	2013	Yōko Maki	The Ravine of Goodbye
27	2014	Rie Miyazawa	Pale Moon
28	2015	Haruka Ayase	Our Little Sister
29	2016	Rie Miyazawa	Her Love Boils Bathwater
30	2017	Yū Aoi	Birds Without Names; Japanese Girls Never Die
31	2018	Sakura Ando	Shoplifters
32	2019	Mayu Matsuoka	Listen to the Universe
33	2020	Masami Nagasawa	Mother; The Confidence Man JP: Episode of the Princess
34	2021	Yūki Amami	What Happened to Our Nest Egg!?
35	2022	Chieko Baisho	Plan 75
36	2023	Mayu Matsuoka	Masked Hearts
37	2024	Mitsuko Kusabue	90 Years Old – So What?
38	2025	Suzu Hirose	A Pale View of Hills; Yasuko, Songs of Days Past; Unreachable
