= Sho Sakurai =

Japanese singer, songwriter, rapper (born 1982)

Sho Sakurai 櫻井 翔
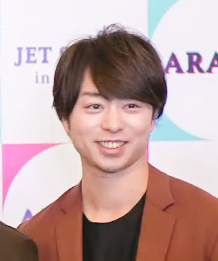
- Sakurai in November 2019

Background information
- Born: January 25, 1982 (age 44)
- Origin: Minato, Tokyo, Japan
- Genres: J-pop; hip hop
- Occupations: Singer; songwriter; rapper; actor; News presenter; host
- Instruments: Vocals; piano
- Years active: 1995–present
- Labels: Starto Entertainment; Storm Labels
- Formerly of: Arashi
- Website: https://sho-sakurai.com/

Sho Sakurai (櫻井 翔, Sakurai Shō) (born January 25, 1982) is a Japanese singer, songwriter, rapper, actor, news anchor, host and former radio host, under agent contract with Starto Entertainment. He is a former member of the boy band Arashi, group to which he belonged until the day it ended activities, May 31, 2026.

Sakurai began his career in the entertainment industry when he joined the Japanese talent agency Johnny & Associates in 1995 at the age of 13. About seven years after his debut as a singer with Arashi in 1999, he became a newscaster in 2006, appearing in the news program News Zero every Monday. In 2008, he was appointed the official newscaster for the news coverage of the Olympic Games in Beijing on NTV. For his work as an actor, singer and newscaster, Sakurai became one of the recipients of GQ Japan's Men of the Year award in 2009. His father is Shun Sakurai, former vice-minister of the Ministry of Internal Affairs and Communications.

== Early life ==
Sakurai was born in Maebashi, Gunma Prefecture, and grew up in Minato, Tokyo, the oldest of three children. His father, Shun Sakurai (桜井 俊), is a former government official who served as Vice Minister of Internal Affairs and Communications, and Vice President of Dentsu Group. Sakurai has a younger sister, Mai (舞) (b. 1986), who was a journalist for Nippon TV, and a younger brother, Shu (修) (b. 1994). a rugby player.

Sakurai attended Keio Yochisha Elementary School, an affiliated elementary school of Keio University. From age three to ten, he did many extracurricular activities, including kendo, swimming, football, oil painting, calligraphy, and scouting. He began music lessons in early childhood, starting with the electric organ at age three and switching to piano in fourth grade. From fourth grade to sixth grade, he played trombone for his school's brass band. He also played trumpet and attended cram school. He joined a local football club after developing a strong interest in football during the J.League boom in 1993. He wanted to play for a professional team and at one point considered studying abroad in Brazil to become a professional footballer. He played football until his second year of junior high school.

Despite already having an established career with Arashi by the time he graduated from high school, Sakurai went on to attend Keio University, graduating with a Bachelor of Economics degree in March 2004. In fact, he was a pioneer among all Johnny's, being the first to graduate from University, inspiring others to pursue higher education.

== Career ==
In 1995, when Sakurai was thirteen years old, he sent an application to the talent agency, Johnny & Associates, and started activities as a Johnny's Jr.

On April 10, 2024, Sakurai posted, via Starto Entertainment's website, his opening a website of his own, as a means of contact point for job requests and inquiries. He commented on the news program "News Zero", in which he appears as Monday night support newscaster since 2006, that he did it as a part of the expansion of activities, as well as of his agent contract with the agency.

On May 9, 2024, he served as navigator for Morinaga's press conference for their health and beauty item Passienol. Sakurai not only led the talk session, but also provided commentary on his use of the product. After more than 11 years working with the company, it was announced, via its SNS, that Sakurai would end his work with Morinaga. As part of the post mentioning InJelly and Carre de Chocolat, the brands for which Sakurai is known for, the company thanked him for his work with them and wished him continued success. Sakurai is to graduate as image character on March 2, 2026.

During an audio live stream held for fan club members in April 2025, he revealed that he was planning to make his official blog "Otonoha" into a book. The paid blog articles (close to 250) have been available through the Family Club web (formerly Johnny's web), a smartphone site, since April 2008, but there was a limit to the number of back issues that could be viewed. Although the contents of the book have not been revealed at this time, there is a possibility these past articles could be reprinted.

He belonged to Arashi from 1999 until the group's end of activities, on May 31, 2026.

=== Music career ===
Sakurai is the designated rapper of Arashi and, although he had written rap lyrics (known to fans as Sakurap) for some of the group's earlier releases under the pen name "Show", his first major contribution was for the A-side song "Kotoba Yori Taisetsu na Mono". While not the first artist from Johnny's to take on rapping, his breakthrough made it easier for his juniors to rap as well, despite being idols. According to Taichi Kokubun of Tokio, ex-KAT-TUN member Koki Tanaka (田中 聖, Tanaka Kōki) began to rap because of him.

He became the first member in Arashi to hold a solo concert called The Show in 2006. Sakurai was also a part of a special group with his Kisarazu Cat's Eye World Series co-stars that same year. Specially formed to promote the movie, they released the movie's theme song "Seaside Bye-Bye" (シーサイドばいばい; "Shisaido Baibai") as a single on October 25, 2006.

Sakurai co-wrote the lyrics of six songs on the August 2010 Arashi album Boku no Miteiru Fūkei. These songs are "Movin' On," "Mada Ue o", "Taboo" (Sho Sakurai solo), "Let Me Down," "Sora Takaku", and "Summer Splash!".

In February 2022, KAT-TUN announced the release of their digital single "Crystal Moment", as the theme song for NTV's coverage of the Beijing 2022 Winter Olympics, the rap lyrics were written by Sakurai. One year later, Sakurai was announced by KAT-TUN'S Ueda as a co-writer for two songs he would be singing in his solo concert in January 2024.

It was announced on January 9, 2025, that Sakurai would be included on the song "come again *Reloaded" in M-Flo's new "M-Flo loves..." series' album "Superliminal", scheduled to be released on February 18.

=== Acting career ===
==== Drama ====
Unlike the other members, who made their major acting debut on stage, Sakurai made his debut on television in Arashi's volleyball-centered short drama V no Arashi (Vの嵐) in 1999. With bandmate Kazunari Ninomiya, he co-starred in the manga-based comedy drama Yamada Tarō Monogatari in 2007. Sakurai had a small guest appearance on the final episode of the drama My Girl in 2009, which was bandmate Masaki Aiba's first starring role in a serial drama. That year, he also had a brief appearance on bandmate Satoshi Ohno's comedy drama series Uta no oniisan, as himself. On January 9, 2010, Sakurai co-starred with the other members of Arashi in the human suspense drama special Saigo no Yakusoku.

In 2001, he took part in his first drama series called Tengoku ni Ichiban Chikai Otoko 2 (天国に一番近い男 – 教師編, The Man Closest to Heaven 2) with Masahiro Matsuoka as his teacher. His role as a student with two conflicting characters won him Best Newcomer in the 5th Nikkan Sports Drama Grand Prix Awards.

In 2003, Sakurai was given his first lead role in the drama Yoiko no Mikata (よい子の味方, Ally of Good Children). He portrayed Taiyō Suzuki (鈴木太陽, Suzuki Taiyō), a man who strives to prove himself capable of being a nursery school teacher. After Yoiko no Mikata, Sakurai took up many drama specials and mini-dramas until 2005. He even acted in a NHK late-night drama series called Tokio, in which each episode lasted for fifteen minutes each.

Although there was no release of dramas, movies or stageplays from Sakurai in 2008 due to his involvement with the Olympic Games in Beijing and Arashi's concert tours, 2009 saw his first lead role in a drama series since Yoiko no Mikata in 2003.

In 2009, in the drama The Quiz Show 2 with You Yokoyama, he portrayed an amnesic host of a live TV quiz program. He portrayed Yukio Tomizawa (富澤友紀夫, Tomizawa Yukio), a 28-year-old life insurance salesman who is caught up in a building hijack. Sakurai appeared in the docudrama special Kobe Shimbun no Nanokakan (神戸新聞の7日間, 7 Days of the Kobe Newspaper) on January 16, 2010. He portrayed Tomohiko Mitsuyama (三津山朋彦, Mitsuyama Tomohiko), a real photo reporter who worked for the Kobe Shimbun and helped keep the newspaper running without interruption despite the damage inflicted from the Kobe earthquake.

On January 17, 2010, TBS aired the first episode of Sakurai and Maki Horikita's comedy drama Tokujo Kabachi!! (特上カバチ!!, lit. Extraordinary Quibbling).

On August 18, 2011, it was announced that Sakurai would be starring in a Fuji TV drama in the Fall season. The drama Nazotoki wa Dinner no Ato de (謎解きはディナーのあとで, lit. Mystery Solving After Dinner) is based on a bestselling novel published in 2010 by author Higashigawa Tokuya. Sakurai co-starred with actress Keiko Kitagawa. The drama aired starting in October. On January 26, 2012, it was announced that Fuji TV would produce a drama special for Nazotoki... to be aired on March 27. Sakurai played the lead role of Kageyama again, while Kitagawa reprised her role of Reiko Hosho. The drama special was filmed at Okinawa. A second special and a movie were released in August 2013

On January 25, 2012, TBS announced a three-night drama special Blackboard – Teachers Waging The Battles of Their Times, which aired in early April. Sakurai starred on the first night as a junior high school teacher who lost his right arm by war and struggled the change of moral after the war. His co-star was Yuko Oshima of AKB48.

In January 2023, Sakurai appeared in his 5th drama with NTV, after Yoiko no Mikata (2003), The Quiz Show 2 (2009), Saki ni Umareta Dake no Boku (2017) and Nemesis (2021). Captured Hospital (Dai byōin senkyo) is about a hospital suddenly occupied by an armed group wearing demon masks. Sakurai plays a detective, currently on leave of absence, who confronts the criminals, in the action-packed suspense drama. A second installment of the series aired in 2024, this time with the building captured being a newly opened airport. In May 2025, a third installment was revealed to be released in July.

==== Film ====
In 2002, Sakurai made his motion picture debut in Arashi's first movie together, Pikanchi Life Is Hard Dakedo Happy (ピカ☆ンチ Life is HardだけどHappy, Pikanchi Life is Hard But Happy). He portrayed Chu, a yankee who dropped out of high school after an incident involving his teacher and the girl he had a crush on. In 2004, he reprised his role for the sequel of Pikanchi Life Is Hard Dakedo Happy, Pikanchi Life Is Hard Dakara Happy (ピカ☆☆ンチ Life is HardだからHappy, Pikanchi Life is Hard Therefore Happy). In 2007, all the members of Arashi co-starred in their third movie together, Kiiroi Namida (黄色い涙, Yellow Tears), with Sakurai playing the role of an aspiring writer. In 2014, in a third installment of the Pikanchi movies, called Pikanchi Life Is Hard Tabun Happy (ピカ☆ンチ Life is HardたぶんHappy, Pikanchi Life is Hard Maybe Happy), Sakurai reprises his role, now as an adult Chu, who has settled down and started a family.

In 2002, in the drama Kisarazu Cat's Eye, he took on the role of Bambi, a college student who becomes part of a burglar ring at the beckoning of his cancer-stricken friend Bussan (played by Junichi Okada) to make his final days worthwhile. The drama would eventually span into two movie sequels entitled Kisarazu Cat's Eye: Nihon Series and Kisarazu Cat's Eye: World Series in 2003 and 2006 respectively.

While training for a rowing competition with the rest of Arashi on their variety show Mago Mago Arashi in 2005, Sakurai filmed his first starring movie role in the manga-based live-action film Honey and Clover. He portrayed the mellow Yūta Takemoto (竹本 祐太, Takemoto Yūta).

By the end of 2007, it was announced that he would star as Gan-chan in the Takashi Miike movie Yatterman, which was not released in theaters until the beginning of 2009.

It was announced on June 8, 2010, that Sakurai would co-star with Aoi Miyazaki in the novel-based movie Kamisama no Karute (神様のカルテ, God's Medical Records), released in theaters in 2011. It would be the first time Sakurai portrayed a doctor. A sequel for the movie, Kamisama no Karute 2 (神様のカルテ2, God's Medical Records 2) hit theaters in 2014. In the first movie, Dr. Ichito Kurihara (Sakurai) was struggling with work life in a countryside hospital on the alert 365 days a year. In the sequel, his struggles between family life and work life are accentuated when Ichito's friend from college, also a physician, Tatsuya Shindo (portrayed by Tatsuya Fujiwara), comes to Ichito's hospital from Tokyo.

On June 4, 2012, the movie version of the popular drama Nazotoki wa Dinner no Ato de (謎解きはディナーのあとで, lit. Mystery Solving After Dinner) was announced. Sakurai once again portrayed the sharp-tongued mysteries-solving butler Kageyama, co-starring with Kitagawa Keiko. The plot of the movie is a murder case that happens on a luxurious cruise ship. Besides set filming, the production team also filmed overseas in Singapore where they boarded the luxurious cruise ship SuperStar Virgo for onsite filming. The movie completed filming by end of July 2012 and was scheduled for release on August 3, 2013, in Japan. The International Gala Premiere was held in Singapore on July 27, 2013, at Marina Bay Sands, where about 2,000 fans from Singapore, Thailand and other countries in the region were treated to face-to-face interactions with the main cast of Sakurai and his fellow cast members, Keiko Kitagawa and Shinai Kippei. Director Masato Hijikata also graced the occasion. Selected fans got to watch the movie premiere with the cast and director in the Sands Theatre, and were treated to a 20-minute Q&A session with the actors and director after the movie screening.In Tokyo, an event took place on July 17, with the main and some additional cast and the director. The Singapore premiere of the movie was scheduled for August 22, 2013, with a special Fans' screening by Golden Village cinemas on August 14, 2013, while in Taiwan it would be released on August 9 and in Hong Kong on September 20.

== Hosting and coverage duties ==
=== Radio ===
From October 5, 2002, to March 30, 2008, Sakurai hosted his own radio show called Sho Beat on FM Fuji.

=== Variety TV Show ===
Sakurai hosted his first solo MC program in 2014. The program, ''Ima, Kono Kao Ga Sugoi'', co-hosted with Hiroiki Ariyoshi, took over Arashi's Himitsu no Arashi chan spot when it ended. The pair continues hosting the Sakurai Ariyoshi The Yakai series (which includes "Abunai", "Yakai House", and "Yakai Cafe").

Starting in January 2021, Sakurai hosts 1 Oku 3000 mannin no Show Channel, a new variety program substituting Arashi's signature program Arashi ni Shiyagare, which ended in December 2020. In September 2022, the program's format and name changed. "Zenkoku Chokusō News Variety no Show Channel" was a news–format program covering gourmet food, local stories, tourist information, etc. from all over the country. The program ended as a regular in March 2024, with a special episode with Sakurai and regulars Eiji Kotoge, Shinichi Hatori and Takashi Yoshimura, under the name "Show Channel otona no shakaikakengaku", with the team visiting different historical sites in Kyoto and Osaka. Two months later, the first individual episode aired, continuing the format of the last regular episode. The show has continued as individual episodes with the four traveling around Japan visiting historical and heritage sites (2025).

Sakurai takes over as the third host for the New Year's revival special of the game show Trans–American Ultra Quiz, after Norio Fukutome and Akira Fukusawa. The game follows a similar format to that of The Amazing Race, in that the contestants have to travel while facing challenges, in this version, via quizzes. Sakurai's version, which is scheduled to air on January 1 and 2, 2027, differs from the original in that the contestants will travel across different continents and countries, while aiming to end in New York City, where the original had contestants travel across America only. The special celebrates the 50th anniversary of the show's first airing.

=== Newscasts, documentary and informative series ===
In 2006, he became a newscaster for the Nippon Television news program News Zero with newscaster Nobutaka Murao and actress Mao Kobayashi. He continues co-hosting Monday's edition, with main newscasters Yumiko Udo (2018–2024) and Takahiko Fujii (2024- )

On June 7, 2009, Sakurai was one of the main newscasters for a special program titled Touch! Eco 2009, which focused on environmental issues.

Sakurai has participated in News Zero's election coverage specials. In 2007, he was chosen to participate in Zero x Senkyo 2007 (Zero×選挙2007, Zero x Election 2007), a special program which focused on the 2007 House of Councillors elections. Sakurai became the first pop idol to host such a program. On August 30, 2009, he was appointed the navigator for the second part of Zero x Senkyo 2009 (Zero×選挙2009, Zero x Election 2009), which covered Japan's 2009 general elections. On July 11, 2010, he took on the role of a navigator for the second half of Zero x Senkyo 2010 (Zero×選挙2010, Zero x Election 2010), which focused on the 2010 House of Councillors elections. In 2012, he was part of the special, covering live from Tokyo Dome. On 2013 he hosted the second part of the special, with a focus on voter turnout. 2014's Zero x Senkyo was Sakurai's sixth NTV election coverage appearance, being navigator for the second part once again. Sakurai, 34 at the time, continued with the 2016 edition (his seventh appearance), now as co-host for the special program. This year's program covered the first time young adults from age 18-19 were given the right to vote. As promoter of the youth vote since 2006, Sakurai commented: "After 70 years... it will be a historic night for the younger generation". He continued as co-host for the 2017 (hosting the "My Voice" corner), 2019, 2021 and 2022 elections. On October 15, 2024, his participation for the 2024 elections was confirmed, making it the 12th time as navigator and/or co-host. He continues as part of the NNN team covering the 2025 Japanese House of Councillors election in Japan, this time including a special campaign project called "Think before you vote: Is that true?", focused on stopping misinformation. The program talked about the influence (good and bad) social media has had on the information shared during election periods. Sakurai participated again in NNN's coverage of the 2026 Japanese general election as special commentator. Continuing with the project called "Think before you vote: Is that true?", this time's election campaigns are one of the shortest, with only 16 days, after the decision to dissolve the House and Prime Minister Takaichi's comments on Taiwan and its repercussions.

In July 2010, Sakurai traveled to Romania, Germany, and Russia to do a special report on world poverty for NTV's 24-Hour Television, which was broadcast on August 29, 2010. He interviewed former Soviet Union General Secretary and Nobel Peace Prize winner Mikhail Gorbachev about nuclear disarmament and poverty.

Sakurai was chosen by NTV as the main MC of their royal wedding special, "British Royal Family Prince William and Princess Kate". The special was aired on April 29, 2011, featuring video footage from the BBC that covered the Wedding of Prince William and Catherine Middleton.

Sakurai appeared in 復興テレビ_みんなのチカラ3.11 (Fukko TV: Minna no Chikara 3.11) aired on NTV on March 11, 2012, a special program to remember the first anniversary of the 2011 Tōhoku earthquake and tsunami, reporting from Aizuwakamatsu City, Fukushima, as part of the news reporting section shared by News Zero, News Every and Shinsō hōdō bankisha!.

On August 4, 2015, Sakurai and Akira Ikegami hosted the first episode of an NTV series called Sakurai Shō & Ikegami Akira Kyōkasho de manabenai (櫻井翔&池上彰 教科書で学べない, Sho Sakurai & Akira Ikegami Can't Learn with Textbooks) (ja). This first installment dealt with a look at the war 70 years after Japan's surrender, and the Japanese peoples understanding of it. A second episode aired on March 1, 2016. This one dealt with a historical look of the Great Eastern Japan Earthquake 5 years after, primarily, and other disasters around the world such as eruptions, landslides, floods and typhoons, and how to deal with them and prepare in order to save lives. A new episode aired two years later, February 6, 2018. On this one, Sakurai and Ikegami talked about "Unexpected Japan", dealing with politics and its relationship to the Olympic Games, North Korea and the imperial family. A fourth installment of the series aired on May 4, 2020, where they talked about the "ultra difficult problems" facing Japan, like the coronavirus and all that happened around the pandemic, such as the closing of schools, delays in services and postponement of big events, like the Tokyo Olympics and Paralympics. On May 31, 2021, a 5th installment of the program aired. With the theme "clear and present danger", Ikegami and Sakurai, together with guests, talked about the ongoing investigation on coronavirus, its sequelae and the fight against it and new viruses. It also included a talk about new AI technology and the risk of it being misused and abused, like in drones, which could be used as weapons, and the so-called "Deepfake", in which false images are used to replace someone else in order to commit crimes, like fraud.

On March 17, 2019, Sakurai and NHK announcer Mayuko Wakuda hosted the first episode of the 4-part documentary "NHK Special 'Space Spectacle'", about the latest achievements in space exploration. The pair hosted all the series, which included topics like the Hayabusa2 mission, the search for Extraterrestrial life, black holes, and the mysteries of the origin of life on Earth and its possible start in outer space, with the last episode airing September 8, 2019.

On December 10, 2022, an NHK documentary called Design Museum Japan, hosted by Sakurai, takes a look at "design treasures" from regions all over Japan. Sakurai hosted again the special in December 2023. He repeated as navigator for the 2025 edition, aired this time on the educational channel of the NHK network.

On December 9, 2024, Sakurai was announced as messenger of a new project regarding the commemoration of the 80th anniversary of the end of World War II. The project called "We must not let the present become a prewar era" (『いまを、戦前にさせない』) started in January 2025 on Nippon TV and its affiliates. Sakurai, together with anchor Taichi Masu, is to host an August 2025 Bankisha program special on the project, regarding the "Doomsday Clock".

Starting in January 2025, Sakurai served as narrator for "Andō Tadao seishun talk", a program hosted by his long-time friend, Architect Tadao Ando, where Ando talks with leading figures from different areas.

=== Sporting event coverage ===
In 2007, he was chosen as the main caster for Fuji TV's broadcast of the 2007 Volleyball World Cup, marking it the first time in eight years that he has been involved with the Volleyball World Cup. In 2008, Sakurai was a newscaster for the 2008 FIVB Women's World Olympic Qualification Tournament and the main newscaster for the news coverage of the Olympic Games in Beijing on NTV.

Sakurai was the special newscaster for NTV's coverage of the 2010 Winter Olympics with Shizuka Arakawa as the main newscaster. They repeated for the 2026 Winter Olympics. On May 13, 2012, NTV announced the appointment of Sakurai as the main caster for their coverage of the 2012 London Summer Olympics, from July 27 to August 12, 2012. It is Sakurai's third consecutive Olympic main caster appointment for NTV after 2008 Beijing and 2010 Vancouver. He was chosen, alongside his Arashi co-member Masaki Aiba, to host the NHK special program coverage for the Tokyo Olympics and Paralympics, celebrated from July 23, 2021. With the appointment as the NTV caster for the Paris Olympics in 2024, Sakurai will have presented the event for the 9th time. As part of the hosting duties for NTV, Sakurai and guests Shinya Ueda and Sanma Akashiya share facts and memories about Japanese athletes in the Olympics, in the Paris Olympic special program Shin jijitsu! Orinpikku-mei bamen saikyō-kin medal award, airing July 22, 2024.

He has been covering rugby events, for both the local teams and for the Rugby World Cup and the Japan National Team, "Brave Blossoms". The NTV programs in which he has appeared covering rugby, including the sports section in News Zero, has had Arashi's song Brave, for which he wrote the rap, as background music. "I wrote it while thinking about all the players who will be fighting hard, like when they're in a scrum", he said about it. He appeared in the "100 days to go" event before the start of the Rugby World Cup 2019. Sakurai was named host of the NTV program "One Rugby", a monthly special (September 6, 2019 – March 24, 2022; May 21, 2022, July 4, 2022) that analyzed the matches for both the local games and for the World Cup. Sakurai was appointed "Japan Rugby Ambassador 2023" for the Japan Rugby team for the France Rugby World Cup. The new position was established by the Japan Rugby Football Union to raise awareness of the Japan Rugby National Team and build momentum for the Rugby World Cup 2023 in France. He was appointed "Japan Rugby Ambasador" again in October 2026 for the 2027 Rugby World Cup, this being his third collaboration as a special supporter, following 2019 and 2023.

=== Music events and programs ===
- Nippon TV Best Artist (日テレ系音楽の祭典 ベストアーティスト) Main Host (2009–2026)
- Nippon TV Music Festival – The Power of Music (日テレ系音楽の祭典 音楽のちから2012) Main Host (2012)
- Nippon TV THE MUSIC DAY Main Host (2013–2026)
- NHK Kōhaku Uta Gassen White team host (solo, 2018, 2019; as part of Arashi, 2010 – 2014), special navigator (2022)
- Netflix Timelesz Project episode 18 (final) Moderator (2025)
- Music Expo Live 2026 in Taipei, MC

=== Telethon ===
Sakurai appears as main personality in NTV's 24-Hr TV for 6th time, 5 with Arashi (2004, 2008, 2012, 2013, 2019) (24時間テレビ) and 1 by himself (2017)

=== Other events and ambassadorships ===
Sakurai appeared in the closing ceremony of the Osaka Expo 2025 on October 13, 2025. His appearance together with that of Yumiko Udo resulted in many comments on SNS referring to the pair's former relationship as co-anchors in NTV's News Zero.

To celebrate the 100th anniversary of Winnie the Pooh, Disney Japan hosted a new project, with Sakurai, Snow Man's Ryohei Abe, and Travis Japan's Noel Kawashima chosen as ambassadors. "Pooh Time" was launched as an initiative to provide everyone who works hard in their busy daily lives a gentle moment to "do nothing". Regarding the project and the ambassadorship, the three coincided that now, as adults, the character has changed their point of view. They see now how profound and even philosophical its presence has been, and that, in a busy–busy world, it is nice to sometimes take some time to "enjoy the moment". The project started on October 14, 2026, Pooh's "birthday".

On October 15, 2026, Sakurai was appointed Press Director of the Japanese chapter of the United Nations High Commissioner for Refugees (UNHCR). Along with the nomination, Sakurai announced a three–year project, "Ray of Hope", its objective: to cover the activities of the agency, by visiting the field, conducting interviews, and conveying the story, doing so through the official page, YouTube and Instagram, where he shares images and videos of his travels through the regions and the people he meets in them.

== Other activities ==
=== Personal exhibition ===
"Sho Sakurai: Words for the Future", is Sakurai's first exhibition centered on his words, both as part of Arashi and as an individual, thought of since 2018, to convey his feelings and words expressed in different ways, like in the reinterpretation of his "Sakurap", and words shared in various media (like narrated excepts from the 2019 Newsweek Japan special feature "Sho Sakurai and the Memory of War"). It was held from April 14 to May 5, 2023, at the Roppongi Museum in Tokyo. A revised edition of the exhibition, called "Playful", started in Play! Museum, in Tachikawa, Tokyo, with venues around the country, starting on January 18, 2024, until April 14, 2024. A new edition of the exhibition opened in 2025, on February 22 in Osaka, March 15 in Nagoya and April 26 in Fukushima.

=== Writer ===
Sakurai participated in a corner in Casa Brutus magazine in September 2010, becoming serialized under the name Sho Sakurai's Architecture Learning Trip (櫻井翔のケンチクを学ぶ旅, Sakurai Sho no Kenchiku o Manabu Tabi) in March 2011. Sakurai traveled along the whole country, meeting with famous Japanese architects. On August 21, 2025, it was announced that the series consisting in more than 150 buildings visited, and meeting architects the likes of Tadao Ando, Toyo Ito, Hiroshi Sugimoto, Kengo Kuma, Terunobu Fujimori, SANAA, Shigeru Ban, Sou Fujimoto, Jun'ya Ishigami, Tsuyoshi Tane, and many others, would be condensed in a book, under the name Sakurai Sho's Architectural Journey. (櫻井翔の建築を巡る旅。, Sakurai Shō no kenchiku o meguru tabi.). The book was released on October 21, 2025. Sakurai's book reached the second spot in the November 3, 2025, Oricon Weekly Book Ranking in its first week of sales, with nearly 14000 issues sold.

Sakurai wrote two articles for Newsweek Japan. The first one was commemorating the 10th anniversary of the 2011 Tōhoku earthquake and tsunami. The second article was a two–parter on the 80th anniversary of the attack on Pearl Harbor. Both articles were written in 2021.

=== SNS ===
On April 2, 2025, Sakurai opened an official Instagram with a video of his private trip to Ghana, posting in both Japanese and English. This is his first trip to the African country, and with this account he said he wishes to share more.

== Commercials ==
(櫻井翔#CM)

- Able Inc. (ja) real estate company (2008–2011)
- Aflac Japan (2011–2023)
- Ajinomoto Frozen Foods (2011)
- Asahi Group Holdings, Ltd.
  - Asahi Soft Drinks "Mitsuya Cider" (2009–2010, 2020–2023) In 2020, with Arashi as a group, including a video of himself with audio from Satoshi Ohno. In 2021–2023, together with fellow Arashi member Masaki Aiba, and including Hey! Say! JUMP member Ryosuke Yamada, Snow Man members Ryohei Abe and Ren Meguro and Johnny's Jr. group Bishounen in a series of commercials for Spring and Summer.
  - Asahi Breweries "New Clear Asahi" beer (2019)
- Benesse Corporation Shinkenzemi Junior High School Seminar (ja) (2011–2013)
- Japanese Cabinet Office 2005 Low-carbon economy (2008)
- House Foods Vermont Curry (2023)
- House Wellness Foods Co., Ltd. (ハウスウェルネスフーズ)(ja) "C1000" (beverage) (2006–2007)
- Japan Airlines (2021–2023) With fellow Arashi member Jun Matsumoto
- Japan Post Co., Ltd. New Year's postcard campaign (2008–2009), also with Arashi (2019)
- JINS Co., Ltd. (ja) chain stores and shopping centers (2012–2014)
- Johnan Academic Preparatory Institute (城南予備校)(ja) (2005)
- JustSystems Smile Seminar (2021–)
- Kao Corporation
  - "Essential" hair product (ja) (2014–2016, 2019–)
  - "MegRhythm" heat patches and eye masks (2016–2023)
- Lawson Inc. (2014–2015)
- Menicon Lactive contact lenses (2022–2023, 2025)
- Mitsui Fudosan real estate (2018–2023)
- Morinaga & Company
  - Morinaga Confectionaries and Health Foods Industry
    - Carré de Chocolat (2024–2026)
    - "in" (formerly Weider's in) jelly drink (2015–2026)
    - Morinaga Cocoa (2017–2023)
    - Passienol (2024) (event navigator)
  - Morinaga Milk Industry "pino" brand ice cream (2010–2016)
- Otsuka Pharmaceutical "Oronamin C" drink (2011–2015)
- Recruit
  - Rikunabi Next (2026)
- Seven & I Holdings
  - Seven-Eleven Japan "Nazotoki wa Dinner no Ato de movie x Seven Eleven" collaboration (2013); (2025- ) (together with Masaki Aiba)
- Shiseido's "Uno" brand "W Design Fiber" hair product x Kisarazu Cat's Eye collaboration (2006)
- Taisho Pharmaceutical
  - Claritin EX (2020–2023, 2025– )
  - Vicks Medicated Drops (2025– )
- Tential
  - Bakune pajamas (2024-)
- Toyota Financial Services Financing Plan (ja) (2007)
- Zurich Insurance Group
  - Zurich Japan automobile insurance (2026-)

=== Other endorsements ===
- Vans Japan (Get On magazine, 2004)

== Personal life ==
On September 28, 2021, Sakurai announced his marriage through a letter he released in their fan club website. Sakurai announced the birth of their first child on February 15, 2023, through official site. Date of birth and child's gender were not revealed.

== Discography ==
=== Music contributions for Arashi ===
A-side songs
Year	Title	Type	Ref
2003	"Kotoba Yori Taisetsu na Mono"	rap	
2004	"Pikanchi Double"	rap	
2005	"Sakura Sake"	rap	
2006	"Kitto Daijōbu"	rap	
2007	"We Can Make It!"	rap	
2008	"Step and Go"	rap	
2008	"Kaze no Mukō e"	rap	
2009	"Believe"	rap	
2012	"Face Down"	rap	
2016	"Daylight"	rap	
2019	"Brave"	rap	
2019	"Turning Up"	rap	
2019	"A-ra-shi: Reborn"	rap	
2020	"Party Starters"	rap	

B-side songs
Year	Title	Type	Ref
2003	"Kimi ga Iinda"	rap (Credited as SHOW)	
2004	"Gori Muchu"	rap	
2005	"Futari no Kinenbi"	rap	
2006	"Na! Na! Na!"	rap	
2007	"Itsumademo"	rap	
2007	"Di-Li-Li"	rap	
2007	"Future"	rap	
2007	"Still..."	rap	
2009	"Tokei Jikake no Umbrella"	rap	
2010	"Spiral"	rap	
2011	"Boom Boom"	rap	
2011	"Utakata"	rap	
2012	"Futari no Katachi"	rap	
2014	"Sync"	rap	
2017	"Unknown"	rap	

Album songs
Year	Title	Tracks	Type	Ref
2002	Here We Go!	"Theme of Arashi"; "All or Nothing Ver.1.02"	rap (credited as SHOW)	
2003	How's It Going?	"Crazy Ground No Ōsama"; "Lucky Man"; "Paretto"	rap	
2004	Iza, Now!	"The Bubble"; "Eyes with Delight"; "Right Back to You" plus single songs	rap	
2004	5x5 The Best Selection of 2002–2004	"La Tormenta 2004"	rap	
2005	One	"Overture"; "Natsu no Namae"; "Subarashiki Sekai"; "Yes? No?"	rap	
2006	Arashic	"Runaway Train"; "Raise Your Hands"; "Cool & Soul"; "Secret Eyes"	rap	
2007	Time	"Wave"; "Firefly"; "Taiyō no Sekai"; "Rock You"; "Cry For You"; "Kaze"; "Life"; "Can't Let You Go"	rap	
2008	Dream "A" Live	"Move You Body"; "Niji no Kanata e"; "Flashback"; "My Answer"; "Once Again"; "Hip Hop Boogie"†	rap lyrics†	
2009	All the Best! 1999–2009	"Re(mark)able"; "5x10"†	rap lyrics (Arashi)†	
2010	Boku no Miteiru Fūkei	"Movin' On"; "Mada Ue o"; "Taboo"; "Let Me Down"; "Sora Takaku"; "Summer Splash!"	rap	
2011	Beautiful World	"Rock this"; "Mada Minu Sekai e"; "Hung up on"; "Joy"; "Kono Mama Motto"	rap	
2012	Ura Ara Mania	"Sketch"†; "Green"††	lyrics and arrangement (w/Kazunari Ninomiya)† lyrics (Arashi)††	
2012	Popcorn	"Welcome to our party"; "Tabi wa Tsuzuku yo"; "Fly on Friday"; "Cosmos"; "Up to you"	rap	
2013	Love	"Ai o Utaō"; "P･A･R･A･D･O･X"; "sugar and salt"; "Starlight kiss"	rap	
2014	The Digitalian	"Tell me why"; "Asterisk"; "Hey Yeah!"; "Take Off !!!!!"†	rap lyrics†	
2015	Japonism	"Kokoro no Sora"; "Kimi e no Omoi"; "Rolling days"; "In the Room"	rap	
2016	Are You Happy?	"Sunshine"; "To my homies" (recording under Sakurai's supervision); "Two to Tango"	rap	
2017	Untitled	"Mikan"; "Hōyō"; "Hikari"; "Come Back"	rap	
2019	5x20 All the Best!! 1999–2019	"5x20"	lyrics (Arashi), rap	
2020	Reborn Vol.1	"A Day in Our Life: Reborn"	rap	
2020	This Is Arashi	"Itsuka Byōshin no Au Koro"; "Do You...?"	rap	

=== Other solo songs ===
- Pen no sasu kata e (2021, lyrics, Keio Kindergarten 150th Anniversary version)

=== Other written songs and collaborations ===
- Crystal Moment (KAT-TUN) (February 2022) (Sakurai wrote the rap part)
- ギリスト！ (Tatsuya Ueda's EP) LCDA-0084 (release on February 7, 2024) (digital and streaming)
1. ギリスト！ (Girist) (co-written with Ueda)
2. 光射す方へ (Hikari sasu kata e) (co-written with Ueda)
- come again *Reloaded (from M-Flo's album Superliminal) (release February 11, 2026, digital and streaming and February 18, CD) (guest, credited as m-flo loves 櫻井翔)

== Filmography ==
=== Television ===
==== Dramas ====
Drama
Year	Title	Role	Notes	Ref.
1999	Nekketsu Ren'ai-dō	Akira Takeuchi	Episode: "Case 9: Ohitsujiza no AB-gata BOY"	
1999	V no Arashi	Sho Sakurai	Lead role with Arashi members	
2000	Otōsan	Akira Ohmura	FNS 27 Hr TV drama special	
2001	Tengoku ni Ichiban Chikai Otoko 2	Ayumi Tōdō		
2002	Shōnen Taiya "Aoki-san Uchi no Oku-san"	Sho	Mini-drama, with fellow Arashi members Satoshi Ohno and Masaki Aiba	
2002	Kisarazu Cat's Eye	Futoshi Nakagomi (Bambi)		
2003	Yoiko no Mikata ~ Shinmai hoikushi monogatari	Taiyō Suzuki	Lead role	
2003	Ikebukuro West Gate Park Special	Bambi	Cameo appearance	
2003	Engimono	Yōhei Yamada	Lead role, Mini-drama, "Haetori Kami" (Episode 14)	
2004	Nurseman Special ~ Ano otoko ga kaettekita	Masaya Iwata	TV special	
2004	Gekidan Engimono	Kantaku	Lead role, mini-drama, "Unlucky Days: Natsume no Mōsō" (Episode 1)	
2004	Tokio: Chichi e no dengon	Tokio Miyamoto		
2005	Yankee Bokou ni Kaeru Special	Masaya Yoshimori	Lead role, TV special	
2005	Gekidan Engimono	Jun Kawase	Lead role, mini-drama, "Ishikawa-ken Gosan-shi" (Episode 11)	
2007	Yonimo Kimyōna Monogatari (2007)	Ota Masakazu	Lead role, mini-drama, "Sainō-dama"	
2007	Yamada Tarō Monogatari	Takuya Mimura	Lead role with Kazunari Ninomiya	
2009	Uta no Onii-san	Himself	Episode 6 guest appearance	
2009	The Quiz Show 2	Satoru Kamiyama	Lead role	
2009	My Girl	Sato	Episode 10 guest appearance	
2010	Saigo no Yakusoku	Yukio Tomizawa	Lead role with Arashi members, TV special	
2010	Kobe Shimbun no Nanokakan	Tomohiko Mitsuyama	Lead role, docudrama special	
2010	Tokujo Kabachi!!	Katsuhiro Tamura	Lead role	
2011	Nazotoki wa Dinner no Ato de	Kageyama	Lead role	
2012	Mou Yuukai Nante Shinai	Kageyama	Cameo appearance	
2012	Nazotoki wa Dinner no Ato de	Kageyama	Lead role, TV special	
2012	Blackboard, Teachers Who Fought Against Era	Shirahama	Lead role (first night), 3-nights TV special	
2012	Papadol!	Himself	Episode 1 guest appearance	
2013	Kazoku Game	Kouya Yoshimoto	Lead role	
2013	Nazotoki wa Dinner no Ato de: Senjō Tantei Kageyama	Kageyama	Lead role, TV special	
2013	Nazotoki wa Dinner no Ato de: Kazamatsuri Keibu no Jikenbo	Kageyama	Special appearance, TV special	
2015	Taishi Kakka no Ryourinin	Ko Osawa	Lead role, TV special	
2016	Sekai Ichi Muzukashii Koi	Himself	Episode 10 guest appearance	
2017	Kimi ni Sasageru Emblem	Kazuya Takajo	Lead role, TV special	
2017	Saki ni Umareta Dake no Boku	Ryosuke Narumi	Lead role	
2019	No Side Manager	Akagi Kazuki	Episode 10 guest appearance	
2021	Nemesis	Naoki Kazama	Lead role with Suzu Hirose	
2023	Captured Hospital	Saburo Musashi	Lead role	
2024	Captured New Airport	Saburo Musashi	Lead role	
2024	Laughing Matryoshka	Ichiro Seike	Lead role	
2025	Captured Broadcasting Station	Saburo Musashi	Lead role	
2026	Gift	Shunji Yanagihara	Last episode guest appearance	

==== Variety programs ====
Year	Title	Role	Notes	Ref.
2013	Ima, Kono Kao Ga Sugoi (今、この顔がスゴい!)	MC	Aired April 11, 2013 – March 20, 2014; Took over the air time of Arashi's "Himitsu no Arashi chan" Named Face TV previous to airing Co-hosted with Hiroiki Ariyoshi	
2014	Sakurai Ariyoshi The Dangerous Night Meeting (櫻井有吉アブナイ夜会, Sakurai Ariyoshi Abunai Yakai)	MC	Aired April 17, 2014 – March 24, 2016; Co-hosted with Ariyoshi	
2015	Sho Sakurai's Johnny's Army VS Hiroyuki Ariyoshi's Entertainer Army Ultimate Battle "Zeus" (櫻井翔のジャニーズ軍VS有吉弘行の芸人軍 究極バトル“ゼウス”, Sakurai Shō no Janīzu-gun VS Ariyoshi Hiroiki no geinin-gun kyūkyoku batoru “Zeusu”)	Team captain	Specials (April 9, 2015; February 11, 2016; November 24, 2016); Competition show between J&A artists vs comedians Co-hosted with Ariyoshi as captains of the opposite teams	
2016	Sakurai Ariyoshi The Night Meeting (櫻井・有吉 THE夜会, Sakurai Ariyoshi The Yakai)	MC	Airing April 7, 2016 – currently Renewal of Abunai Yakai, the free–talk format has undergone several changes, including "Yakai House", "Yakai Café" and "Yakai Kitchen", this one with the hosts cooking with the guests. Co-hosted with Ariyoshi	
2021	130 Million People's Show Channel (1億3000万人のSHOWチャンネル, 1 oku 3000 man nin no Show Channel)	MC	Aired from January 21, 2021– August 30, 2022; Conceived as a "project" show, where celebrities and common people could try doing anything they had never done before; this included Sakurai himself.	
2022	Nationwide local news variety show SHOW Channel (全国ご当地ニュースバラエティーSHOWチャンネル, Zenkoku gotōji nyūsubaraetī Shō Chan'neru)	MC	September 3, 2022 – May 2024; Continuation of 130 Million People's Show Channel; Changed to a news–information format	
2024	Show Channel Otona no shakai kakengaku SP (SHOWチャンネル大人の社会科見学SP)	MC	May 12, June 22, 2024; April 5, 2025; September 30, 2026; Continuation of 130 Million People's Show Channel. Travel specials	
2024	Jinsei de 1-ban nagakatta hi (人生で1番長かった日)	MC	October 2024; February, June 2025; Talk show format	
2025	Drama de quiz! The Kirinuki (ドラマでクイズ！THEキリヌキ)	MC	April, October 2025; January, April 2026; Drama information–based game show	
2025	Sakurai Shingo no onisuke tabi (櫻井信五の鬼スケ旅)	MC	May, October 2025 (with Super Eight's Shingo Murakami); 2–day intense scheduled travel	
2025	Sakurai Sho's One Night Study (櫻井翔のワンナイトスタディ)	MC	May, December 2025; Sakurai's first Fuji TV solo program One night spent learning different trades in different places	
2025	Sho Sakurai's Happiness Gozen - Nice Morning Life (櫻井翔の幸せごぜん〜NICE MORNING LIFE〜)	MC	August 10, 2025; February 22, 2026; December 5, 2026; Sakurai's first BS Fuji crown program Morning travelogue	
2025	Sakurai Shō no ichiran factory ~"Are" zenbu narabete mita!~ (櫻井翔の一覧ファクトリー～“アレ”全部並べてみた！～)	MC	December 30, 2025; September 19, 2026; Sakurai is the manager of a "List Factory", where they produce never-before-seen "lists", providing information in an original form	
2025	Kanji X to meiten no yoru ~ Sakurai Sho wa dare o yobu?~ (幹事Xと名店の夜～櫻井翔は誰を呼ぶ？～)	MC	Special (December 27, 2025). Host to 6 people in a reserved restaurant	
2026	Sekai ga horeta zeppin! Sho–case (世界がほれた 絶品！翔ケース)	MC	January 6, September 21, 2026; With graphic designer Taku Satoh; Finding hidden treasures around Japan	
2026	Shinken yūgi! The Battle Show (真剣遊戯!THEバトルSHOW)	MC	Start 20 April 2026; Two teams (idols vs entertainers/comedians) compete against each other, with a special "Sakurai Chance", with which they may use Sakurai's help once per game.	
2026	Trans–American Ultra Quiz (アメリカ横断ウルトラクイズ)	MC	Special (January 1–2, 2027); The Amazing Race–like game, with contestants travelling around the world, answering quizzes	

=== Film ===
Year	Title	Role	Notes	Ref.
2002	Pikanchi Life is Hard Dakedo Happy	Tadashi Kamogawa (Chu)	Lead role with Arashi members	
2003	Kisarazu Cat's Eye: Nihon Series	Futoshi Nakagomi (Bambi)		
2004	Pikanchi Life is Hard Dakara Happy	Tadashi Kamogawa (Chu)	Lead role with Arashi members	
2006	Honey and Clover	Yūta Takemoto	Lead role	
2006	Kisarazu Cat's Eye: World Series	Futoshi Nakagomi (Bambi)		
2007	Kiiroi Namida	Ryūsan Mukai	Lead role with Arashi members	
2009	Yatterman	Gan-chan	Lead role	
2011	In His Chart	Ichito Kurihara	Lead role with Aoi Miyazaki	
2013	The After-Dinner Mysteries	Kageyama	Lead role with Keiko Kitagawa	
2014	In His Chart 2	Ichito Kurihara	Lead role with Aoi Miyazaki	
2014	Pikanchi Life is Hard Tabun Happy	Tadashi Kamogawa (Chu)	Lead role with Arashi members	
2018	Laplace's Witch	Shūsuke Aoe	Lead role	
2023	Nemesis: The Mystery of the Golden Spiral	Naoki Kazama	Lead role with Suzu Hirose	
2024	The Three Young-Men in Midnight: The Movie 2	Masked man		
2027	Boke Biyori	Kosuke Akutsu		

== Theatre ==
Year	Title	Role	Notes
1997	Kyo to Kyo		
1998	Kyo to Kyo	Tokyo Hamamatsuchō	
2004	West Side Story	Tony	Lead role
2006	The Beautiful Game	John Kelly	Lead role

== Awards and nominations ==
Year	Organization	Award	Work	Result
2002	5th Nikkan Sports Drama Grand Prix	Best Newcomer	Tengoku ni Ichiban Chikai Otoko 2	Won
2009	61st Television Drama Academy Awards	Best Actor	The Quiz Show 2	Nominated
2009	GQ Japan Men of the Year 2009 Awards	GQ Man of the Year 2009 (Note: Sakurai was one of the five honorees for GQ Men of the Year 2009.)		Won
2010	64th Television Drama Academy Awards	Best Actor	Tokujo Kabachi!!	Nominated
2012	21st Annual TV Life Awards	Best Actor	Nazotoki wa Dinner no Ato De	Won
2012	71st Television Drama Academy Awards	Best Actor	Nazotoki wa Dinner no Ato De	Nominated
2013	17th Nikkan Sports Drama Grand Prix (Spring)	Best Actor	Kazoku Game	Won
2013	77th Television Drama Academy Awards	Best Actor	Kazoku Game	Won
2014	23rd Annual TV Life Awards	Best Actor	Kazoku Game	Won

== Books and magazine articles ==
- Sakurai Sho no kenchiku o meguru tabi. (ISBN 978-4838733583, publisher: Magazine House, release October 21, 2025)
- Newsweek Japan (2021–03, 2021-12)
