= Maho Toyota =

Japanese actress and model (born 1967)

- Born: Maho Toyota (豊田真帆); July 6, 1967 (age 58); Tokyo, Japan
- Occupations: Actress, model
- Years active: 1989–present
- Height: 1.73 m (5 ft 8 in)
- Spouse: Shinji Aoyama (m. 2002; died 2022)

Maho Toyota (とよた 真帆, Toyota Maho) (born July 6, 1967) is a Japanese actress and model.

She is frequently seen on television, where she has acted in over 100 serial dramas and television movies.

She was the wife of the film director Shinji Aoyama. She co-starred in his film Desert Moon with Hiroshi Mikami, which screened in competition at the 2001 Cannes Film Festival.

== Filmography ==
=== As actor ===
- Gendai Ninkyoden (1997)
- Gokudo no Onna-tachi: Kejime (1998)
- 9 (2000)
- Gokudo no Onna-tachi: Jigoku no Michizure (2001)
- Backstage (2001)
- Desert Moon (2001)
- Picaresque: Ningen Shikkaku (2002)
- Days in the Shade (2003)
- Catch a Wave (2006)
- Sad Vacation (2007)
- Jirocho Sangokushi (2008)
- Romantic Prelude (2009)
- Asahiyama Zoo Story: Penguins in the Sky (2009)
- Inochi no Sanga: Nihon no Aozora 2 (2009)
- Sadako DX; (guest appearance) (2022)
- Plastic (2023)
- Voice (2024)
- BAUS: The Ship's Voyage Continues (2025), Tane

=== As voice actor ===
- Walkin' Butterfly (2008)
