= Sad Vacation =

- Directed by: Shinji Aoyama
- Written by: Shinji Aoyama
- Produced by: Naoki Kai
- Starring: Tadanobu Asano; Eri Ishida; Aoi Miyazaki; Yuka Itaya
- Cinematography: Masaki Tamura
- Edited by: Yuji Oshige
- Music by: Hiroyuki Nagashima
- Distributed by: Style Jam
- Release dates: 31 August 2007 (Venice Film Festival); 8 September 2007 (Japan)
- Running time: 110 minutes
- Country: Japan
- Language: Japanese

Sad Vacation (サッド ヴァケイション, Saddo Vakeishon) is a 2007 Japanese drama film written and directed by Shinji Aoyama, adapted from his novel. Being third and last of Aoyama's "Kitakyushu Saga", Sad Vacation brings together several characters from his previous films Helpless and Eureka and continues to explore their lives, all the while being a separate story that doesn't require watching previous films. It was named after the Johnny Thunders song.

== Plot ==
Kenji Shiraishi (Tadanobu Asano) is involved in trafficking of illegal immigrants from China to Japan. One of such cases leaves an immigrant child to be an orphan. Instead of selling him with others that arrived, Kenji flees with the boy to look after him and make an attempt at normal life. The people after the boy, unexpected encounter with long lost family members and his own vengeful nature are standing in a way of his future.

== Cast ==
- Tadanobu Asano as Kenji Shiraishi
- Eri Ishida as Chiyoko Mamiya
- Aoi Miyazaki as Kozue Tamura
- Yuka Itaya as Saeko Shiina
- Katsuo Nakamura as Shigeki Mamiya
- Kengo Kora as Yusuke Mamiya
- Kaori Tsuji as Yuri Matsumura
- Joe Odagiri as Goto
- Ken Mitsuishi as Shigeo
- Yoichiro Saito as Akihiko
- Maho Toyota as Makimura
- Kōsuke Toyohara as Kawashima
- Kyūsaku Shimada as Sone
- Yusuke Kawazu as Kijima

== Reception ==
Travis Mackenzie Hoover of Exclaim! gave the film a favorable review, saying: "While the film is a tad on the nose with some of its dialogue (and has a magic-realist coda totally out of character with the rest of the movie), mostly the approach is singular, uncompromising and strangely affirmative in spite of it all." Todd Brown of Twitch Film described the film as "a quietly powerful drama in which Aoyama manages to address blood ties, fate and regeneration".

== Awards ==
It won the Jury Award at the 2008 New York Asian Film Festival.
