= Masaya Nakahara =

Masaya Nakahara 中原 昌也
- Also known as: Violent Onsen Geisha; Hair Stylistics
- Born: June 4, 1970 (age 55); Tokyo, Japan
- Genres: Noise music
- Occupations: Musician, writer, actor
- Years active: 1988–present
- Labels: Boid, Daisyworld

Masaya Nakahara (中原 昌也, Nakahara Masaya; born June 4, 1970), also known by his stage names Violent Onsen Geisha and Hair Stylistics, is a Japanese musician, writer and actor. He was described by Allmusic as "one of those musical entities that defy categorization." He co-starred in Shinji Aoyama's 2005 film My God, My God, Why Hast Thou Forsaken Me? with Tadanobu Asano.

== Discography ==
=== Violent Onsen Geisha ===
- Excrete Music (1991)
- Otis (1993)
- Que Sera, Sera (1995)
- Black Lovers: Early Lost Tapes 1988 (1995)
- The Midnight Gambler (1996)
- Nation of Rhythm Slaves (1996)
- Teenage Pet Sounds (1996)

=== Hair Stylistics ===
- 1996–1999 (2001)
- Custom Cock Confused Death (2004)
- AM 5:00+ (2007)
- Expanded Pussies (2009)
- Live! (2009)
- Live: Album (2010)

=== Guest appearances ===
- Jim O'Rourke – "After the Fox" from All Kinds of People: Love Burt Bacharach (2010)

=== Remixes ===
- Cornelius – "Volunteer Ape Man (Disco)" from 96/69 (1996)
- Hanayo – "Makka na Shizuku" from Sayonalala (1996)
- Microstoria – "Endless Summer NAMM" from Reprovisers (1997)

== Bibliography ==
- Mari & Fifi's Massacre Songbook (2001)
- Bouquets of Flowers Everywhere (2001)
- Naughty Manifesto of the Futurist Kids (2004)
- The Nameless Orphans' Grave (2006)
- KKK Bestseller (2006)
- Less than IQ84! (2010)

== Filmography ==
- My God, My God, Why Hast Thou Forsaken Me? (2005)
