= Masaki Tamura =

Japanese cinematographer (1939–2018)

- たむら まさき
- Born: 田村 正毅; 26 January 1939; Aomori Prefecture, Japan
- Died: 23 May 2018 (aged 79); Tokyo, Japan
- Occupation: Cinematographer

Masaki Tamura (たむら まさき, Tamura Masaki; 26 January 1939 – 23 May 2018) was a Japanese cinematographer. He was also credited as Masaki Tamra.

== Career ==
Born in Aomori Prefecture, Tamura early on worked at Iwanami Productions (Iwanami Eiga), where as an assistant he helped photograph documentary films. He became a full-fledged cinematographer working on many of the documentaries of Shinsuke Ogawa. At the same time, he began photographing feature fiction films by directors such as Kazuo Kuroki, Yōichi Higashi, and Toshiya Fujita. He particularly became known for his collaborations with Mitsuo Yanagimachi. After working with many famous directors such as Juzo Itami, Sōgo Ishii, Gō Takamine, Kiyoshi Kurosawa, and Kaizō Hayashi, he began working in the 1990s with a new generation of directors, such as Nobuhiro Suwa, Naomi Kawase, and Makoto Satō. His collaborations with Shinji Aoyama were notable in his final years.

== Awards ==
In 1982, he won the Mainichi Film Award for best cinematography for the film Farewell to the Land. The same year, he won the best cinematography award at the Yokohama Film Festival for Farewell to the Land and A Japanese Village - Furuyashikimura.

== Selected filmography ==
- Narita: The Peasants of the Second Fortress (1971)
- Heta Village (1973)
- Lady Snowblood (1973)
- Lady Snowblood 2: Love Song of Vengeance (1974)
- Ryoma Ansatsu (1974)
- Farewell to the Land (1982)
- A Japanese Village: Furuyashikimura (1982)
- P.P. Rider (1983)
- The Crazy Family (1984)
- Fire Festival (1985)
- Tampopo (1985)
- Magino Village: A Tale (1987)
- Evil Dead Trap (1988)
- Untamagiru (1989)
- Helpless (1996)
- 2/Duo (1997)
- Suzaku (1997)
- Serpent's Path (1998)
- Eyes of the Spider (1998)
- Shady Grove (1999)
- Eureka (2000)
- Desert Moon (2001)
- Mike Yokohama: A Forest with No Name (2002)
- A Boy's Summer in 1945 (2002)
- Lakeside Murder Case (2004)
- My God, My God, Why Hast Thou Forsaken Me? (2005)
- Crickets (2006)
- Sad Vacation (2007)
- Tokyo Rendezvous (2008)
- I Am a Cat Stalker (2009)
- The Wife of Gegege (2010)
- Drive-In Gamo (2014), and director
