= Kamisama no Karute 2 =

- DVD cover
- Directed by: Yoshihiro Fukagawa
- Written by: Noriko Gotō
- Produced by: Masaya Shibusawa
- Starring: Sho Sakurai; Aoi Miyazaki; Tatsuya Fujiwara
- Cinematography: Kosuke Yamada
- Edited by: Naoya Bandō
- Music by: Yuki Hayashi
- Production companies: Hakuhodo; The Asahi Shimbun; Shogakukan; J Storm; Nippan Group Holdings
- Distributed by: Toho
- Release date: March 21, 2014 (Japan)
- Running time: 116 minutes
- Country: Japan
- Language: Japanese
- Box office: US$7,259,785

Kamisama no Karute 2 (Japanese: 神様のカルテ2), also known as The Chart of Love or In His Chart 2, is a 2014 Japanese film directed by Yoshihiro Fukagawa. It is a sequel to Kamisama no Karute. The film was released in Japan on 21 March 2014.

== Plot ==
Some months after the events in the previous movie, Dr. Kurihara has continued working at Honjo Hospital, a hospital in the Nagano countryside that is on alert 24/7 for all 365 days of the year. He and his wife have now a daughter.(ja)

One day, Kurihara learns that his collegemate, Dr. Tatsuya Shindo, is transferring to Honjo. He is happy to meet with his long time friend. Shindo was considered as "the most conscientious of the medical school", but now, his priorities in life have changed, and is dedicated to his wife and child, and will not continue working after hours. This has caused some problems at the beginning of his stay at Honjo. And, especially, with Kurihara.
At the same time, Kurihara has suffered the loss of his mentor, Dr. Nukita, who was director of the Department of Gastroenterology at Honjo, and someone who has spent his whole life at the medical service. Just before his passing, Kurihara and Shindo, who has been influenced also by Nukita, collaborate to make Nukita's dying wish true.

== Cast ==
- Sho Sakurai (Dr. Ichito Kurihara)
- Aoi Miyazaki (Haruna Kurihara)
- Tatsuya Fujiwara (Dr. Tatsuya Shindo)

== Reception ==
As of April 17, 2014, the film has grossed US$7,259,785 in Japan.
