= Meikyū Love Song =

Single by Arashi

from the album Popcorn
- Released: November 2, 2011
- Recorded: 2011
- Genre: Pop
- Length: 33:58
- Label: J Storm
- Songwriter(s): Iori, iiiSAK, Dyce Taylor

Arashi singles chronology
"Lotus" (2011)	"Meikyū Love Song" (2011)	"Wild at Heart" (2012)

"Meikyū Love Song" (迷宮ラブソング, Labyrinth Love Song) is a song recorded by Japanese boy band Arashi. It was released on November 2, 2011, by their record label J Storm. "Meikyū Love Song" was used as the ending theme song to the drama Nazotoki wa Dinner no Ato de starring Arashi member Sho Sakurai. The single debuted at No. 1 on the Oricon weekly charts. According to Oricon, the single sold 614,131 copies and ranked number seven on its list of best-selling singles.

== Track listing ==
Regular edition
No.	Title	Lyrics	Music	Arrangement	Length
1.	"Meikyū Love Song" (迷宮ラブソング)	Iori	IiSAK; Dyce Taylor	Trevor Ingram	4:37
2.	"Together, Forever"	100+	100+	Hirofumi Sasaki	4:45
3.	"Utakata" (うたかた)	R.P.P.; Sho Sakurai	Youwhich; Taylor	Youwhich	4:06
4.	"Wanna Be..."	Iori; Soluna	Kōsuke Ōshima	Taku Yoshioka	3:32
5.	"Meikyū Love Song" (instrumental)				4:37
6.	"Together, Forever" (instrumental)				4:45
7.	"Utakata" (instrumental)				4:06
8.	"Wanna Be..." (instrumental)				3:28
Total length:					33:58

Limited edition
No.	Title	Lyrics	Music	Arrangement	Length
1.	"Meikyū Love Song"	Iori	IiSAK; Taylor	Ingram	4:37
2.	"Kienu Omoi" (消えぬ想い)	Alt	Yoshiyasu Ichikawa; Tatsurō Mashiko; Ha-j	Ichikawa; Mashiko; Ha-j	4:04
Total length:					8:41

Limited edition – DVD
No.	Title	Length
1.	"Meikyū Love Song" (Music video)
