= Your Eyes (Arashi song) =

Single by Arashi

from the album Popcorn
- Released: June 6, 2012
- Recorded: 2012
- Genre: Pop
- Label: J Storm
- Songwriter(s): hs; Chris Janey; Max Grant

Arashi singles chronology
"Face Down" (2012)	"Your Eyes" (2012)	"Calling / Breathless" (2013)

"Your Eyes" is the 39th single by the Japanese boy band Arashi. It was released on June 6, 2012 by their record label J Storm. "Your Eyes" is the theme song for the drama Mikeneko Holmes no Suiri starring Arashi member Masaki Aiba. The single comes in two editions. The Regular Edition comes with the B-sides "voice" and "Hanabi" (花火) and the instrumental versions for both songs. The limited edition comes with a promotional video, the B-side "Kimi ga Iru Kara" (君がいるから), and a 16-page booklet. The song debuted at No. 1 on the Oricon weekly charts, selling 477,820 copies in its first week.

== Track listing ==
Regular edition
No.	Title	Lyrics	Music	Arrangement	Length
1.	"Your Eyes"	hs	Chris Janey; Max Grant	Tomoki Ishizuka	4:40
2.	"Hanabi" (花火, "Fireworks")	Tatsuro Mashiko	Mashiko	Mashiko; Sachiko Miyano	3:48
3.	"Voice"	alt	Takamasa Segi	Hirofumi Sasaki	4:32
4.	"Your Eyes" (instrumental)		Janey; Grant	Ishizuka	4:40
5.	"Hanabi" (instrumental)		Mashiko	Mashiko; Miyano	3:48
6.	"Voice" (instrumental)		Segi	Sasaki	4:32
Total length:					26:00

Limited edition
No.	Title	Lyrics	Music	Arrangement	Length
1.	"Your Eyes"	hs	Janey; Grant	Ishizuka	4:40
2.	"Kimi ga Iru kara" (君がいるから, "Because You're Here")	Eltvo	Eltvo	Taku Yoshioka	3:55
3.	"Kimi ga Iru kara" (instrumental)		Eltvo	Yoshioka	3:55
Total length:					13:30

Limited edition – DVD
No.	Title	Director	Length
1.	"Your Eyes" (Music video)	Hideaki Sunaga
