= Crickets (film) =

2006 film by Shinji Aoyama

- Film poster
- Directed by: Shinji Aoyama
- Screenplay by: Ryo Iwamatsu
- Story by: Motohiro Hatanaka
- Produced by: Motohiro Hatanaka; Akihiko Yose
- Starring: Kyōka Suzuki; Tsutomu Yamazaki; Masanobu Andō; Ayumi Ito
- Cinematography: Masaki Tamura
- Edited by: Yuji Oshige
- Music by: Hiroyuki Nagashima
- Production company: Aoi Promotion
- Release date: September 8, 2006 (Venice Film Festival)
- Running time: 102 minutes
- Country: Japan
- Language: Japanese

Crickets (こおろぎ, Kōrogi) is a 2006 Japanese drama film directed by Shinji Aoyama.

== Cast ==
- Kyōka Suzuki as Kaoru
- Tsutomu Yamazaki as Blind Man
- Masanobu Andō as Taichi
- Ayumi Ito as Eiko

== Production ==
Crickets was filmed in 1.33:1 aspect ratio.

== Release ==
Crickets debuted in Orizzonti section at the 63rd Venice International Film Festival on September 8, 2006.

== Reception ==
Film Comment named the film as one of "19 Films to Look Out For" in 2007. Japanese film critic Shigehiko Hasumi said, "Crickets can be seen as a bold reply to Sokurov’s The Sun."
