= Grass Labyrinth =

- DVD cover
- Kusa Meikyū (草迷宮)
- Directed by: Shūji Terayama
- Written by: Shūji Terayama; Rio Kishida
- Starring: Hiroshi Mikami; Takeshi Wakamatsu; Juzo Itami
- Cinematography: Tatsuo Suzuki
- Edited by: Tomoyo Ōshima
- Music by: J. A. Seazer
- Distributed by: Toei Company (Japan)
- Release dates: 1979 (France); November 12, 1983 (Japan)
- Running time: 40 minutes
- Countries: France; Japan
- Language: Japanese

Grass Labyrinth (Japanese: 草迷宮, Hepburn: Kusa meikyū) is a Japanese film directed by Shūji Terayama which was released in France in 1979 and in Japan in 1983.

== Plot ==
A surreal excursion into a young man's subconscious as he searches for the words to a tune that his mother may have sung to him as a child. The dreamlike images culminate in a scene of a girl's naked body covered with calligraphic characters.

== Cast ==
- Hiroshi Mikami as Akira (as a boy)
- Takeshi Wakamatsu as Akira (as a man)
- Keiko Niitaka as Mother
- Juzo Itami as Principal / Priest / Old man
- Miho Fukuya as Girl
- Masaharu Satō

== Release ==
Grass Labyrinth was originally one of the installments in a French movie package called Private Collections, the other two sections being directed by Walerian Borowczyk and Just Jaeckin, both associated with avant-garde films with strong sexual content. Grass Labyrinth was the longest of the three and was later (1983) released as a separate film in Japan.

== Awards and nominations ==
8th Hochi Film Award

- Won: Best Actor – Juzo Itami
