= Aoi Miyazaki =

Japanese actress (born 1985)

- 宮﨑 あおい
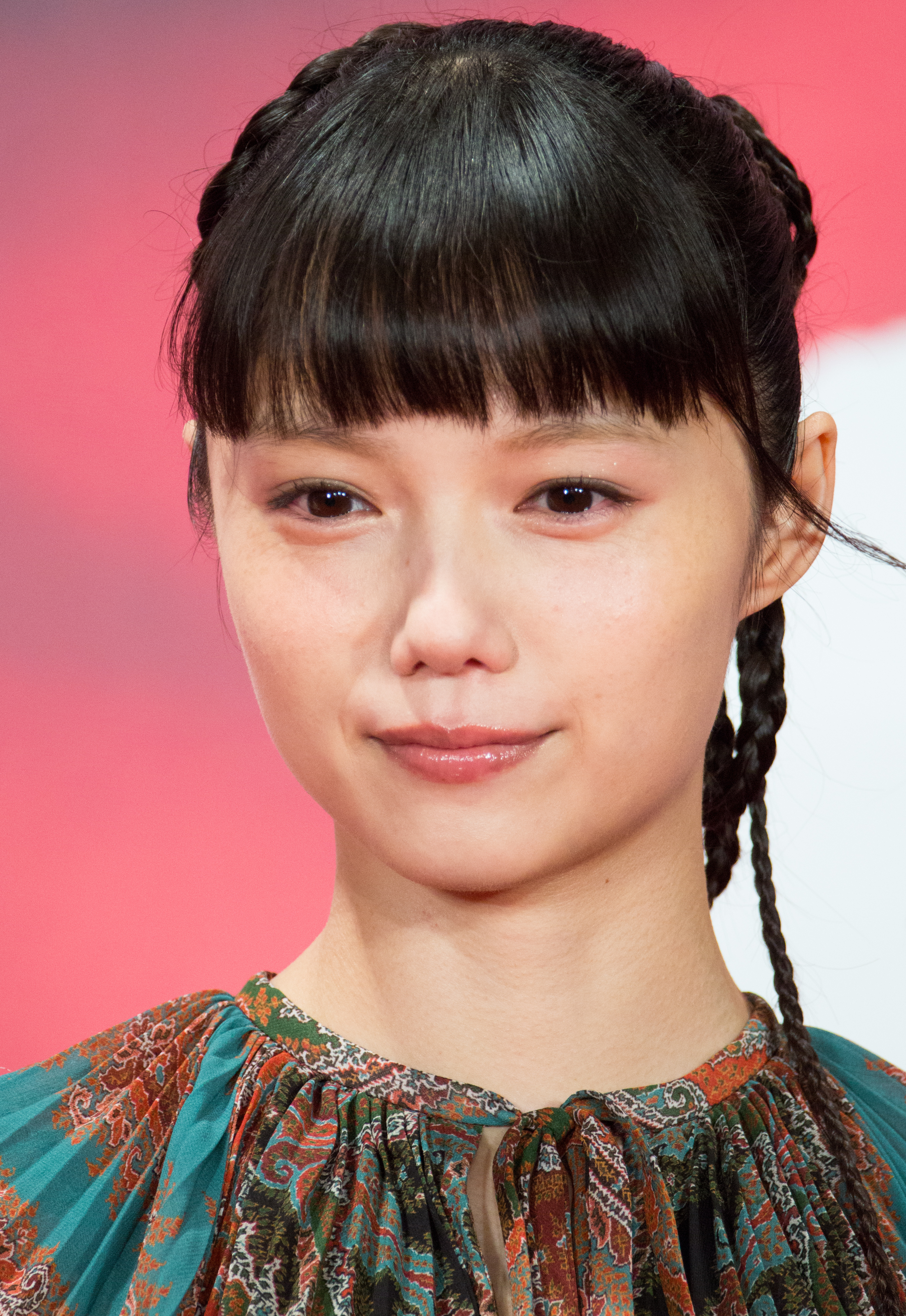
- Miyazaki at the Tokyo International Film Festival in October 2017
- Born: 30 November 1985 (age 40); Tokyo, Japan
- Occupation: Actress
- Years active: 1990–present
- Spouses: Sosuke Takaoka (m. 2007; div. 2011); Junichi Okada (m. 2017)
- Children: 4
- Website: www.aoimiyazaki.jp

Aoi Miyazaki (宮﨑 あおい, Miyazaki Aoi; born 30 November 1985) is a Japanese actress. She is known for her roles in Nana and Virgin Snow.

== Career ==
Miyazaki started working in the entertainment industry at the age of four. Initially she appeared mostly in commercials, magazine advertisements, and as an extra in television dramas. Miyazaki made her film debut in Ano Natsu no Hi at the age of 14.

Also at the age of 14, Miyazaki began to draw international attention for her role as the survivor of a traumatic bus hijack in Shinji Aoyama's Eureka. The film won the International Federation of Film Critics Prize at the Cannes Film Festival 2000, and resulted in her receiving the Best Actress award at the Japanese Professional Movie Awards. She also made her musical debut in The Little Prince in 2003.

Later, Miyazaki won Best Actress award in the Cinemanila International Film Festival for her performance in Harmful Insect. She teamed up with Aoyama again in Eli, Eli, Lema Sabachthani?, an Un Certain Regard selection at Cannes 2005. Later in the same year, she co-starred with Mika Nakashima in the mainstream and commercially successful Nana.

She won the Galaxy Individual Award for her performance in the NHK drama Atsuhime in 2008.

== Endorsements ==
Miyazaki has appeared in commercials for major corporations including Aflac, Tokyo Metro, NTT DoCoMo and Olympus. In early 2008, she was selected as Emporio Armani's new print advertisement model. Miyazaki has been the face of the Japanese popular apparel brand Earth music&ecology since 2010.

== Humanitarian activities ==
In recent years, Miyazaki has taken a more prominent position in humanitarian activism projects.

She travelled with her older brother and fellow actor, Masaru Miyazaki, to Bangladesh in 2005 to experience poverty firsthand, and they highlighted the problems then found in their 2006 photobook Tarinai Peace.

The siblings travelled to Denmark and Finland in 2006 to investigate global warming. Their experiences were then published in their 2007 photobooks Love, Peace, and Green Tarinai, Peace2.

Miyazaki took part in the Gold Ribbon Walking event in Roppongi, Tokyo in 2008 to raise awareness and funds for childhood cancer.

Her 2008 film, Children of the Dark, addresses issues of child exploitation.

== Personal life ==
Miyazaki married actor Sosuke Takaoka, her partner since she was fifteen, on 15 June 2007. They divorced in December 2011, with Takaoka subsequently accusing her of committing adultery on his Twitter account.

Miyazaki married singer Junichi Okada on 23 December 2017 after dating for two and a half years. The couple jointly announced that they had welcomed the birth of their first child, a son, born May 2018. In August 2025, Miyazaki revealed in an interview with the weekly women's magazine Josei Seven, that she had given birth to her fourth child earlier that year. She also stated that she chose not to announce her second, third, and fourth pregnancies to avoid media attention.

== Filmography ==
=== Film ===
Year	Title	Role	Notes	Ref.
1999	Ano Natsu no Hi	Tama Kobayashi		
2000	Swing Man	Futami Minase		
2001	Eureka	Kozue Tamura		
2002	Harmful Insect	Sachiko Kita	Lead role	
2002	Pakodate-jin	Hikaru "Pikaru" Hino	Lead role	
2002	Tomie: Forbidden Fruit	Tomie Hashimoto	Lead role	
2003	Lovers' Kiss	Eriko Kawana		
2004	Loved Gun	Miyuki		
2004	A Blue Automobile	Konomi Saeki		
2004	Riyu	Yukari Ishida		
2004	Amoretto	Female high-school student		
2005	All About My Dog	Mika	Lead role; Marimo segment	
2005	Nana	Nana Komatsu	Lead role	
2006	Origin: Spirits of the Past	Toola (voice)	Lead role	
2006	Gimme Heaven	Mari Michiki		
2006	My God, My God, Why Hast Thou Forsaken Me?	Hana		
2006	Su-ki-da	Yu (young)	Lead role	
2006	Hatsukoi	Misuzu	Lead role	
2006	Heavenly Forest	Shizuru Satonaka	Lead role	
2006	Umi de no Hanashi	Kaede Fukino	Lead role	
2007	Tokyo Tower: Mom and Me, and Sometimes Dad	DJ Idol		
2007	Virgin Snow	Nanae Sasaki	South Korean-Japanese film	
2007	Sad Vacation	Kozue Tamura		
2008	Bloody Snake Under the Sun	An Anjo		
2008	Flowers in the Shadows	Naruko/Hisako		
2008	Children of the Dark	Keiko Otowa		
2009	Brass Knuckle Boys	Kanna Kurita	Lead role	
2009	Mt. Tsurugidake	Hatsuyo Shibasaki		
2010	Solanin	Meiko	Lead role	
2010	Here Comes the Bride, My Mom!	Tsukiko Morii	Lead role	
2010	Colorful	Shōko Sano (voice)		
2011	In His Chart	Haruna Kurihara		
2011	My So Has Got Depression	Haruko	Lead role	
2011	Chronicle of My Mother	Kotoko		
2012	Wolf Children Ame and Yuki	Hana (voice)	Lead role	
2012	Tenchi: The Samurai Astronomer	En		
2013	Petal Dance	Jinko	Lead role	
2013	The Great Passage	Kaguya Hayashi		
2013	Yellow Elephant	Aiko Tsumari	Lead role	
2013	Dawn of a Filmmaker: The Keisuke Kinoshita Story	Teacher and narrator		
2014	The Chart of Love	Haruna Kurihara		
2014	The Vancouver Asahi	Toyoko		
2015	The Boy and the Beast	Child Kyūta (voice)		
2016	Rage	Aiko		
2016	If Cats Disappeared From the World	She		
2016	Birthday Card	Yoshie		
2017	The Last Recipe	Chizuru Yamagata		
2022	Lonely Castle in the Mirror	Kitajima-sensei (voice)		
2023	In Love and Deep Water	Chizuru Banjaku	Lead role	
2023	We're Broke, My Lord!	Natsu		
2024	Kadono Eiko's Colorful Life: Finding the Magic Within	Narrator		
2025	5 Centimeters per Second	Koshimizu		

=== TV dramas ===
Year	Title	Role	Notes	Ref.
1999	Genroku Ryōran	Sayo Yatō	Taiga drama	
2000	Hatachi no Kekkon	Shiori Chūganji		
2000	Girl	Azusa Minami	Lead role	
2000	Himitsu Club O-daiba.com	Rei Kōgen		
2001	Kabushikikaisha O-daiba.com	Rei Kōgen		
2001	R-17	Yukari Nomura		
2001	Fure, Fure Jinsei!	Kyōko Yūki		
2001	Ao to Shiro de Mizuiro	Kaeda Uchiyama	Lead role; TV movie	
2002	Shiawase No Shippo	Moe Sasamoto		
2002	Keitaideka Zenigata Ai	Ai Zenigata	Lead role	
2004	Chotto Matte Kamisama	Akihiko Amagi		
2004	The Reason	Yukari Ishida	TV movie	
2004	Chichi no Umi, Boku no Sora	Honoka Arai	TV movie	
2006	Junjo Kirari	Sakurako Arimori	Lead role; Asadora	
2008	Atsuhime	Tenshō-in Atsuhime	Lead role; Taiga drama	
2011	Madame Butterfly	Cho Ito (Cho cho san)	Lead role; miniseries	
2012	Going My Home	Naho Shimojima		
2015	Here Comes Asa	Hatsu Imai	Asadora	
2017	Kurara: The Dazzling Life of Hokusai's Daughter	Oei	Lead role; TV movie	
2018	Brother and Sister	Monchi	Lead role; TV movie	
2020	Ashita no Kazoku	Risa Onodera	Lead role; TV movie	
2023	Ranman	Narrator / Noriko Fujihira	Asadora	
2025	Just a Bit Espers	Shiki		
2026	Brothers in Arms	Oichi	Taiga drama	

=== Dubbing ===
- Franny's Feet, Franny

== Awards ==
Year	Award	Category	Work(s)	Result
2001	23rd Three Continents Festival	Best Actress	Harmful Insect	Won
2002	Cinemanila International Film Festival	Best Actress	Harmful Insect	Won
2002	15th Nikkan Sports Film Award	Best New Talent	Harmful Insect	Won
2002	11th Japan Film Professional Awards	Best New Encouragement	Eureka	Won
2002	16th Takasaki Film Festival	Best New Actress	Eureka	Won
2008	Vogue Japan Women of the Year			Won
2009	33rd Elan d'or Awards	Newcomer of the Year	Atsuhime	Won
2009	12th Nikkan Sports Drama Grand Prix	Best Actress	Atsuhime	Won
2009	45th Galaxy Award	Individual Award	Atsuhime	Won
2009	5th TVnavi's Drama of the Year 2008	Best Actress	Atsuhime	Won
2010	33rd Japan Academy Film Prize	Best Actress	Shonen Merikensack	Nominated
2011	24th Nikkan Sports Film Award	Best Actress	Tsure ga Utsu ni Narimashite and Kamisama no Karute	Won
2012	35th Japan Academy Film Prize	Best Actress	Tsure ga Utsu ni Narimashite	Nominated
2013	36th Japan Academy Film Prize	Best Supporting Actress	Chronicle of My Mother	Nominated
2014	37th Japan Academy Film Prize	Best Actress	The Great Passage	Nominated
2016	41st Hochi Film Award	Best Supporting Actress	Rage, If Cats Disappeared From the World and Birthday Card	Nominated
2016	29th Nikkan Sports Film Award	Best Supporting Actress	Rage and If Cats Disappeared From the World	Won
2017	59th Blue Ribbon Awards	Best Supporting Actress	Rage and If Cats Disappeared From the World	Nominated
2017	71st Mainichi Film Awards	Best Supporting Actress	Rage	Nominated
2017	40th Japan Academy Film Prize	Best Actress	Rage	Nominated
2017	40th Japan Academy Film Prize	Best Supporting Actress	Birthday Card	Nominated
