= My God, My God, Why Hast Thou Forsaken Me? (film) =

2005 film

- Theatrical release poster
- Directed by: Shinji Aoyama
- Written by: Shinji Aoyama
- Produced by: Takenori Sento
- Starring: Tadanobu Asano; Aoi Miyazaki; Mariko Okada
- Cinematography: Masaki Tamura
- Music by: Hiroyuki Nagashima
- Release dates: 18 May 2005 (Cannes); 28 January 2006 (Japan)
- Running time: 107 minutes
- Country: Japan
- Language: Japanese

My God, My God, Why Hast Thou Forsaken Me?, originally titled as Eli, Eli, Lema Sabachthani? (エリ・エリ・レマ・サバクタニ, Eri Eri Rema Sabakutani), is a 2005 Japanese drama film directed by Shinji Aoyama, starring Tadanobu Asano. It was screened in the Un Certain Regard section at the 2005 Cannes Film Festival.

== Plot ==
A global virus is killing mankind, but 2 radical musicians seem curiously immune...

== Cast ==
- Tadanobu Asano as Mizui
- Aoi Miyazaki as Hana
- Mariko Okada as Navi
- Masaya Nakahara as Asuhara
- Yasutaka Tsutsui as Miyagi
- Masahiro Toda as Natsuishi
- Shingo Tsurumi as Kazemoto
- Yusuke Kawazu as Miyazawa
- Erika Oda as Eriko
