= Desert Moon (film) =

2001 film by Shinji Aoyama

- Film poster
- Directed by: Shinji Aoyama
- Written by: Shinji Aoyama
- Starring: Hiroshi Mikami; Maho Toyota; Shuji Kashiwabara; Yukiko Ikari
- Cinematography: Masaki Tamura
- Edited by: Shinji Aoyama
- Music by: Jim O'Rourke
- Release dates: June 20, 2001 (France); July 26, 2003 (Japan)
- Running time: 131 minutes
- Country: Japan
- Language: Japanese

Desert Moon (月の砂漠, Tsuki no Sabaku) is a 2001 Japanese drama film written, directed and edited by Shinji Aoyama, starring Hiroshi Mikami. It was in competition at the 2001 Cannes Film Festival.

== Plot ==
The film's main theme is the conflict between work and family commitments in modern Japan. It focuses on a successful internet entrepreneur Nagai (Hiroshi Mikami), whose wife Akira (Maho Toyota) and young daughter Kaai (Yukiko Ikari) left him because he neglected them for his business. A young hustler Keechie (Shuji Kashiwabara), who has emotion problems concerning his own father, becomes involved in the family's drama.

== Cast ==
- Hiroshi Mikami as Nagai
- Maho Toyota as Akira
- Shuji Kashiwabara as Keechie
- Yukiko Ikari as Kaai
- Isao Natsuyagi as Tsuyoshi's father
- Kumiko Akiyoshi as Keechie's client
- Itsuji Itao as interviewer

== Reception ==
Derek Malcolm of Screen International criticized the film, saying: "the problem with the film is that, instead of letting these sequences speak for themselves, it constantly underscores them with speeches that often seem pretentious and clichéd at the same time". David Rooney of Variety praised Masaki Tamura's cinematography, describing it as "graceful, leisurely camerawork and elegant framing".
