= Tomoyo Ōshima =

Japanese film editor (born 1949)

- 大島 ともよ
- Born: 1949 (age 76–77); Akita, Japan
- Occupation: Film editor

Tomoyo Ōshima (大島 ともよ, Ōshima Tomoyo; born 1949) is a Japanese film editor, known as editor of Nagisa Oshima's and Shuji Terayama's films in her young days. She is the director of Tokyo Filmex, a film festival.

== Selected filmography ==
- God Speed You! Black Emperor (1976)
- Grass Labyrinth (1979)
- Merry Christmas, Mr. Lawrence (1983) – 1983 Cannes Film Festival
- Rock yo shizukani nagareyo (1988)
- Maborosi (1995) – 52nd Venice International Film Festival
- Falling Into the Evening (落下する夕方, 1998) – 48th Berlin International Film Festival
- Taboo (1999) – 2000 Cannes Film Festival
- Dead Run (疾走, 2005) – 56th Berlin International Film Festival
- The Harimaya Bridge (2009)
