= Lakeside Murder Case =

- Film poster
- Directed by: Shinji Aoyama
- Written by: Shinji Aoyama; Masaki Fukasawa
- Based on: Lakeside by Keigo Higashino
- Produced by: Takenori Sento
- Starring: Kōji Yakusho; Hiroko Yakushimaru; Etsushi Toyokawa
- Cinematography: Masaki Tamura; Yoshihiro Ikeuchi
- Edited by: Shinji Aoyama
- Music by: Hiroyuki Nagashima
- Release date: October 11, 2004 (Busan International Film Festival)
- Running time: 119 minutes
- Country: Japan
- Language: Japanese

Lakeside Murder Case (レイクサイド マーダーケース, Reikusaido mādā kēsu) is a 2004 Japanese mystery film directed by Shinji Aoyama, starring Kōji Yakusho, Hiroko Yakushimaru and Etsushi Toyokawa.

== Plot ==
Four couples are staying at a lakeside cottage with their children. They want them to prepare intensely for a prestigious high school's entrance exam with the help of a private tutor. One night, one of the wives confesses to her husband that she has killed his mistress...

== Cast ==
- Kōji Yakusho as Shunsuke Namiki
- Hiroko Yakushimaru as Minako Namiki
- Etsushi Toyokawa as Masaru Tsukumi
- Akira Emoto as Tomoharu Fujima
- Fukumi Kuroda as Kazue Fujima
- Shingo Tsurumi as Takashi Sekiya
- Kaoru Sugita as Yasuko Sekiya
- Yuko Mano as Eriko Takashina

== Production ==
In an interview with Midnight Eye, the director Shinji Aoyama said, "I wanted to talk about whether parents really understand their kids and vice-versa. That's really the most basic thing the film is about." In an interview with The Japan Times, he stated that it was a story about ordinary people, saying "At first they don't understand anything -- then they find out little by little. There's no professional detective. Everyone is an amateur. It's an all-amateur mystery."

== Reception ==
Mark Shilling of The Japan Times gave the film 3.5 stars out of 5. He felt that the film was "less a commercial whodunit with a gorgeous corpse than a dark, multilayered psycho-drama, whose subjects include the ills of the Japanese educational system and the moral limits of parental love." However, he also noted that it was "more mainstream" than Shinji Aoyama's other films. He concluded by saying, "the film does pose a timely question. In a winner-take-all society, how can one compete successfully and stay human? The answer may be staring us in the face, albeit from the bottom of a lake." Russell Edwards of Variety said, "[Koji] Yakusho delivers yet another credible performance. Other thesps are solid and tech credits are excellent."
