= Wild at Heart (Arashi song) =

Single by Arashi

from the album Popcorn
- Released: March 7, 2012
- Recorded: 2012
- Genre: Pop; rock
- Label: J Storm
- Songwriter(s): Soluna; Chris Janey; Junior Jokinen

Arashi singles chronology
"Meikyū Love Song" (2011)	"Wild at Heart" (2012)	"Face Down" (2012)

"Wild at Heart" (ワイルド アット ハート) is a song recorded by Japanese boy band Arashi. It was released on March 7, 2012, by their record label J Storm. "Wild at Heart" is the theme song for the drama Lucky Seven starring Arashi member Jun Matsumoto. The song has been described as an "energetic rock" song complementing the drama. The single debuted at number-one on the Oricon daily and weekly charts. It is the group's 26th consecutive number one single.

== Track listing ==
Regular edition
No.	Title	Lyrics	Music	Arrangement	Length
1.	"Wild at Heart" (ワイルド アット ハート)	Soluna	Chris Janey; Junior Jokinen	Trevor Ingram	4:09
2.	"Tsuite Oide" (ついておいで)	Mi-n	IiSAK; Anton Lindsjö	Ha-j	4:15
3.	"Futari no Katachi" (ふたりのカタチ)	Sho Sakurai; Mayumi Sudō	Kazumi Mitome	Tomoki Ishizuka	4:48
4.	"Wild at Heart" (instrumental)		Janey; Jokinen	Ingram	4:09
5.	"Tsuite Oide" (instrumental)		IiSAK; Lindsjö	Ha-j	4:15
6.	"Futari no Katachi" (instrumental)		Mitome	Ishizuka	4:48

Limited edition
No.	Title	Lyrics	Music	Arrangement	Length
1.	"Wild at Heart"	Soluna	Janey; Jokinen	Ingram	4:09
2.	"How Can I Love"	Octobar	Octobar; Fox	Taku Yoshioka	4:06

Limited edition – DVD
No.	Title	Length
1.	"Wild at Heart" (Music video)
