= Face Down (Arashi song) =

2012 single by Arashi

- Regular edition cover

Single by Arashi

from the album Popcorn
- Released: May 9, 2012
- Recorded: 2012
- Genre: Pop
- Length: 3:57
- Label: J Storm
- Songwriter(s): Eltvo; Sho Sakurai; Albi Albertsson; Royce.H; Vincent Stein; Konstantin Scherer

Arashi singles chronology
"Wild at Heart" (2012)	"Face Down" (2012)	"Your Eyes" (2012)

"Face Down" is a song by the Japanese boy band Arashi. It was released on May 9, 2012, under the record label J Storm as the third single from their eleventh studio album Popcorn (2012). "Face Down" is the theme song of the Japanese television series Kagi no Kakatta Heya, which stars Satoshi Ohno, the member of the group. The single was released in two versions; the regular edition came with the song "Mezashita Mirai e" (目指した未来へ) as B-side and the instrumental versions of both songs, the limited edition accompanied with a DVD including the music video of "Face Down" and the B-side "Hitori Janai sa"(ひとりじゃないさ).

On June 26, 2020, the rearranged version of the song, titled "Face Down: Reborn" was released as a digital download. The production for the version was taken by the multi-platinum selling producers, BloodPop and Tom Norris.

== Chart performance ==
"Face Down" debuted at number one on the Oricon Singles Chart, selling 526,000 copies in its first week, and stayed on the chart for 23 weeks. It was the group's twenty-seventh consecutive, and thirty-fourth overall number-one single in Japan. "Face Down" ranked as the seventh best-selling single of 2012 in Japan, with 619,940 physical copies sold.

== Track listing ==
Regular edition
No.	Title	Lyrics	Music	Arrangement	Length
1.	"Face Down"	Eltvo; Sho Sakurai	Albi Albertsson; Royce.H; Vincent Stein; Konstantin Scherer	Metropolitan Digital Clique; Stein; Scherer	3:57
2.	"Mezashita Mirai e" (目指した未来へ, "Go Towards Your Future")	Mi-n; Alleztune	Hikari	Hikari	4:37
3.	"Face Down" (instrumental)				3:57
4.	"Mezashita Mirai e" (instrumental)				4:37
Total length:					17:08

Limited edition
No.	Title	Lyrics	Music	Arrangement	Length
1.	"Face Down"	Eltvo; Sakurai	Albertsson; Royce.H; Stein; Scherer	Metropolitan Digital Clique; Stein; Scherer	3:57
2.	"Hitori Janai sa" (ひとりじゃないさ, "I'm Not Alone")	Task	Shingo Asari	Hirofumi Sasaki	4:59
3.	"Hitori Janai sa" (instrumental)				4:59
Total length:					13:55

Limited edition – DVD
No.	Title	Director	Length
1.	"Face Down" (Music video)	Kensuke Kawamura

== Charts ==
=== Weekly charts ===
Chart (2012)	Peak position
Japan (Japan Hot 100)	1
Japan (Oricon)	1
South Korea (Gaon)	36
South Korea International Chart (Gaon)	7
Taiwan (G-Music)	9
Taiwan East Asian Chart Chart (G-Music)	3

=== Monthly charts ===
Chart (2012)	Peak position
Japan (Oricon)	2
South Korea International Chart (Gaon)	22

=== Year-end charts ===
Chart (2012)	Peak position
Japan (Japan Hot 100)	6
Japan Top Sales (Japan Hot 100)	5
Japan (Oricon)	7

== Release history ==
Release history and formats for "Face Down"
Region	Date	Edition	Format(s)	Label(s)
Japan	May 9, 2012	Standard	CD	J Storm
Japan	May 9, 2012	Limited	CD/DVD	J Storm
Japan	November 3, 2019		Digital download; streaming	J Storm

== Face Down: Reborn ==
"Face Down: Reborn"

Promotional single by Arashi

from the album This Is Arashi
- Released: June 26, 2020
- Genre: Pop; J-pop
- Length: 3:54
- Label: J Storm
- Songwriter(s): Eltvo; Albi Albertsson; Royce. H; Vincent Stein; Konstantin Scherer; Ellen Shipley
- Producer(s): BloodPop; Tom Norris

"Face Down: Reborn" is a rearranged version of "Face Down", produced by American music producers BloodPop and Tom Norris. The version was released digitally on June 26, 2020 as a part of the Reborn Project, with the group performing the rearranged and re-written versions of their hit songs, including their debut single "Arashi" and "Love So Sweet", with new English lyrics as part of them. The song was included in the 2nd. CD of album This Is Arashi's limited edition, released November 3, 2020.

=== Track listing ===
Digital download
No.	Title	Lyrics	Music	Producer(s)	Length
1.	"Face Down: Reborn"	Eltvo	Eltvo; Albi Albertsson; Royce. H; Vincent Stein; Konstantin Scherer; Ellen Shipley	BloodPop; Tom Norris	3:54
Total length:					3:54

=== Charts ===
==== Weekly charts ====
Chart (2012)	Peak position
Japan (Japan Hot 100)	20
Japan (Oricon)	2

=== Release history ===
Release history and formats for "Face Down: Reborn"
Region	Date	Format(s)	Label(s)
Various	June 26, 2020	Digital download	J Storm
Japan	November 3, 2020	CD	J Storm

== See also ==
- List of Oricon number-one singles of 2012
