= Popcorn (Arashi album) =

Studio album by Arashi
- Released: October 31, 2012
- Genre: Pop, R&B
- Language: Japanese, English
- Label: J Storm

Arashi chronology
Ura Ara Mania (2011)	Popcorn (2012)	Love (2013)

Singles from Popcorn
- 1. "Meikyū Love Song" Released: November 2, 2011; 2. "Wild at Heart" Released: March 7, 2012; 3. "Face Down" Released: May 9, 2012; 4. "Your Eyes" Released: June 6, 2012

Popcorn is the eleventh studio album of the Japanese boy band Arashi. The album was released on October 31, 2012 under their record label J Storm in two editions: a first press/limited edition and a regular edition. Though both versions contains a single CD and the same track list, the first press edition features special packaging of 24P photo booklet Until The Popcorn Pops and bonus stickers. With more than 750,000 units sold, the album was certified for Triple Platinum by the Recording Industry Association of Japan (RIAJ). It was released digitally on February 7, 2020.

== Album information ==
Both the first press and regular versions contain a CD with sixteen tracks. However, the first press edition comes with a 36P lyrics booklet while the regular edition comes with only a 32P lyrics booklet. The album jacket cover for both versions are also different.

=== Songs ===
"Popcorn" includes four of the group's previously released singles: "Meikyū Love Song", "Wild at Heart", "Face Down" and "Your Eyes". This album also includes seven new songs plus five of each member's solo songs.

"Kakenukero!", the second track of this album was used as the "Nissan Serena" CM song. Track 15, "Akashi" was used as the theme song for London Nippon Television 2012.

Four tracks of this album were used as the theme song for dramas starred by the Arashi members. These songs are "Wild at Heart", "Face Down", "Meikyū Love Song", and "Your Eyes", used in dramas Lucky Seven, Kagi no Kakatta Heya, Nazotoki wa Dinner no Ato de, and Mikeneko Holmes no Suiri, respectively.

== Promotion ==
To support their new album, Arashi performed a live tour "Arashi LIVE TOUR Popcorn" hitting all the major dome stadiums in Japan. They had 16 performances beginning on November 16 at the Kyocera Osaka Dome, followed by Sapporo Dome on November 30, Fukuoka Dome on December 7, Tokyo Dome on December 13, and Nagoya Dome on January 11, 2013.

== Track listing ==
No.	Title	Lyrics	Music	Arrangement	Length
1.	"Welcome to Our Party"	Soluna; Shun; Sho Sakurai	Stephan Elfgren; Conor Edwards; Junior Jokinen	Taku Yoshioka	3:58
2.	"Kakenukero!" (駆け抜けろ！, "Run Through")	S-Tnk	Takuya Harada; Samuli Laiho; Pessi Levanto	Tomoki Ishizuka	4:31
3.	"Wild at Heart"	Soluna	Chris Janey; Jokinen	Trevor Ingram	4:08
4.	"Face Down"	Eltvo; Sakurai	Albi Albertsson; Royce. H; Vincent Stein; Konstantin Scherer	Metropolitan Digital Clique; Stein; Scherer	3:58
5.	"We Wanna Funk, We Need a Funk" (Jun Matsumoto solo)	Shigeo; Bruce R. F. Smith; John World	Smith; Mats Ymell	Metropolitan Digital Clique	4:36
6.	"Two" (Satoshi Ohno solo)	Soluna	Erik Lidbom; R.P.P.	Lidbom	3:56
7.	"Waiting for You"	Soluna	Octobar; IiSAK	Yoshioka; Sachiko Miyano	3:58
8.	"Rakuen" (楽園, "Paradise", Masaki Aiba solo)	S-Tnk	Tomoyoshi Suzuki	Slice Of Life; Tatsuya K.	3:38
9.	"Tabi wa Tsuzuku yo" (旅は続くよ, "The Journey Will Continue")	Furaha; Sakurai	Curly; Youwhich	Youwhich	4:59
10.	"Sore wa Yappari Kimi deshita" (それはやっぱり君でした, "It Was You, After All", Kazunari Ninomiya solo)	Kazunari Ninomiya	Masahiro Oochi	Ha-j; Ninomiya	5:02
11.	"Meikyū Love Song" (迷宮ラブソング, "Labyrinth Love Song")	Iori	IiSAK; Dyce Taylor	Ingram	4:38
12.	"Your Eyes"	Hs	Janey; Max Grant	Ishizuka	4:40
13.	"Fly on Friday" (Sho Sakurai solo)	Eltvo; Sakurai	Eltvo	Kz	4:20
14.	"Cosmos"	Pause; Eltvo; Sakurai	Lidbom	Hirofumi Sasaki	4:51
15.	"Akashi" (証, "Proof")	QQ	QQ	Ha-j	4:56
16.	"Up to You"	Iori; 100+; Sakurai	Wet Disk; Christofer Erixon; Joakim Björnberg	Metropolitan Digital Clique	4:18
Total length:					70:27
