= Shingo Tsurumi =

Japanese actor

- Born: December 29, 1964 (age 61); Kita-Aoyama, Minato-ku, Tokyo, Japan
- Occupation: Actor
- Years active: 1977–present

Shingo Tsurumi (鶴見 辰吾, Tsurumi Shingo; born December 29, 1964 in Tokyo) is a Japanese actor.

== Career ==
Shingo Tsurumi has appeared in the films such as Katsuhito Ishii's Shark Skin Man and Peach Hip Girl, Hideo Nakata's L: Change the World, and Tak Sakaguchi's Yakuza Weapon.

== Filmography ==
=== Films ===
- Tonda Couple (1980), Yūsuke Tashiro
- Typhoon Club (1985)
- The Sound of Waves (1985)
- Gonin (1995), Shigeru Hisamatsu
- Atashi wa juice (1996)
- Spiral (1998)
- Shark Skin Man and Peach Hip Girl (1999)
- Dead or Alive (1999)
- Kaza Hana (2000)
- Freeze Me (2000)
- Hysteric (2000)
- Sukedachiya Sukeroku (2001)
- Gun Crazy: A Woman from Nowhere (2002)
- Hitokiri Ginji (2003)
- Lakeside Murder Case (2004)
- The Thousand Year Fire (2004)
- My God, My God, Why Hast Thou Forsaken Me? (2005)
- Hinagon (2005)
- Lorelei: The Witch of the Pacific Ocean (2005)
- School Daze (2005)
- L: Change the World (2007)
- Hana Yori Dango Final (2008)
- Yakuza Weapon (2011)
- Life Back Then (2011)
- Kamen Rider × Kamen Rider Fourze & OOO: Movie War Mega Max (2011)
- Kamen Rider Fourze the Movie: Everyone, Space Is Here! (2012)
- Crow's Thumb (2012)
- The Great Passage (2013), Murakoshi
- Kikaider Reboot (2014), Gilbert Kanzaki
- Our Family (2014)
- The Vancouver Asahi (2014), Tony Shishido
- My Hawaiian Discovery (2014)
- Gonin Saga (2015), Shigeru Hisamatsu
- Orange (2015)
- Sailor Suit and Machine Gun: Graduation (2016)
- The Sun (2016), Seiji Soga
- Shin Godzilla (2016), Yajima
- Satoshi: A Move for Tomorrow (2016)
- The Age of Shadows (2016), Higashi
- Poetry Angel (2017), Tsutomu's father
- Shiori (2018)
- Walking with My Grandma (2018)
- Wish You Were Here (2018)
- Masquerade Hotel (2019), Takura
- Journey of the Sky Goddess (2019)
- Amber Light (2019)
- Shadowfall (2019)
- The Flowers of Evil (2019)
- Project Dream: How to Build Mazinger Z's Hangar (2020)
- Daughters (2020)
- All the Things We Never Said (2020), Tashiro
- Silent Tokyo (2020)
- Living in the Sky (2020)
- The Sun Stands Still (2021), Mantarō Kawakami
- Rurouni Kenshin: The Final (2021), Chief Uramura
- Caution, Hazardous Wife: The Movie (2021)
- The Road to Murder: The Movie (2021)
- In the Wake (2021)
- Masquerade Night (2021), Takura
- A Madder Red (2021)
- Usogui: Lie Eater (2022)
- Cherry Magic! the Movie (2022)
- Goodbye Cruel World (2022)
- Tokyo MER: Mobile Emergency Room – The Movie (2023), Shūsei Kugayama
- Masked Hearts (2023), Sasaki (voice)
- The Moon (2023)
- Cells at Work! (2024)
- Tokyo MER: Mobile Emergency Room – Nankai Mission (2025), Shūsei Kugayama
- Tokyo MER: Mobile Emergency Room – Capital Crisis (2026), Shūsei Kugayama
- Tokyo Burst: Crime City (2026)

=== Television ===
- Kinpachi-sensei (1979)
- Kusa Moeru (1979), Manju
- Mujaki na Kankei (1984)
- School Wars (1984)
- Ponytail wa Furimukanai (1985)
- Chikyoudai (1985)
- Yonimo Kimyona Monogatari: 1990 Okujou Fuukei (1990)
- Yonimo Kimyona Monogatari: 1991 Miminari (1991)
- Yonimo Kimyona Monogatari: 1991 Himitsu no Hanazono (1991)
- Sugao no Mama de (1992)
- Onichan no Sentaku (1994)
- Station (1995)
- Heart ni S (1995)
- Koi wa Aserazu (1998)
- Man, Next Natural Girl: 100 Nights In Yokohama (1999)
- Taiyou wa Shizumanai (2000)
- Kabachitare (2001)
- Aibou 2 (2003)
- Ichiban Taisetsu na Hito wa Dare Desu ka (2004)
- Onna no Ichidaiki (2005)
- Kiken na Aneki (2005)
- Hoshi ni Negai wo (2005)
- Shiawase ni Naritai! (2005)
- Koi ni Ochitara (2005)
- Makeinu no Toboe (2005)
- Yoshitsune (2005), Taira no Munemori
- Gekidan Engimono Beautiful Sunday (2005)
- Kurosagi (2006)
- Hana Yori Dango 2 (2007)
- Yukan Club (2007)
- Kagerō no Tsuji Inemuri Iwane Edo Zōshi (2007–09), Nakai Hanzō
- Okasan, Boku ga Umarete Gomen Nasai (2007)
- Shin Machiben (2007)
- Team Batista no Eikō (2008)
- Kasouken no Onna: 2008 Special (2008)
- Atashinchi no Danshi (2009)
- Otomen (2009)
- Kagero no Tsuji 3 (2009)
- Tenchijin (2009), Akechi Mitsuhide
- Reinoryokusha Odagiri Kyoko no Uso (2010)
- Saka no Ue no Kumo (2010), Toshitane Matsukawa
- Kamen Rider Fourze (2011)
- Ningen Konchuki (2011)
- Brutus no Shinzo (2011)
- Lady: Saigo no Hanzai Profile (2011)
- Umechan Sensei (2012)
- Flower, Maeda Atusko's FullVideo version (2012)
- Gunshi Kanbei (2014), Kobayakawa Takakage
- When a Tree Falls (2018), Tadayuki Ishibashi
- The Road to Murder (2020)
- Shikatanakatta to Iute wa Ikan no desu (2021)
- Galápagos (2023)
- Brothers in Arms (2026), Asakura Yoshikage
- Zenigata Heiji (2026)

=== Video games ===
- Yakuza 0 as Tsukasa Sagawa (2015)
