= Kisarazu Cat's Eye =

2002 Japanese TV comedy series

- Movie poster
- Genre: Comedy
- Written by: Kankurō Kudō
- Directed by: Fuminori Kaneko
- Starring: Junichi Okada; Sho Sakurai; Yoshinori Okada; Ryuta Sato; Takashi Tsukamoto
- Ending theme: A Day in Our Life by Arashi
- Country of origin: Japan
- Original language: Japanese
- No. of episodes: 9 (list of episodes)

Production
- Producer: Aki Isoyama

Original release
- Network: TBS
- Release: January 18 – March 15, 2002

Kisarazu Cat's Eye (Japanese: 木更津キャッツアイ, Hepburn: Kisarazu Kyattsu Ai) is a Japanese comedy television show and movie series. There have been two Kisarazu Cat's Eye movies: Kisarazu Cat's Eye Nihon Series (also known as Kisarazu Cats' Eye - Go Major!) (2003) and Kisarazu Cats Eye: World Series (also known as Kisarazu Cats' Eye - Sayonara Game) (2006).

== Synopsis ==
The story follows a 21-year-old young man named Kohei (Okada Junichi) in Kisarazu, a city in Chiba, Japan. Diagnosed with cancer, he has 6 months to live, but instead of being depressed, he decides to make something of the time he has left.

The show focuses mainly on Kohei and his close friends: They grew up on the same high school baseball team. Kohei, known as Bussan to his close friends, forms the group "Kisarazu Cat's Eye" which also consists of Bambi (Sakurai Sho), Master (Ryuta Sato), Ani (Tsukamoto Takashi), and Ucchi (Okada Yoshinori). The theme of the group is based on a manga (Japanese comic) called Cat's Eye or キャッツ アイ. The friends, however, play baseball during the day while getting into mischief at night. Sometimes they solve life crises; mainly, however, they solve smaller, humorous problems.

== Cast ==
Info

- Bussan (Kohei Tabuchi) - Junichi Okada
- Bambi (Futoshi Nakagomi) - Sho Sakurai
- Ucchi (Uchiyama) - Yoshinori Okada
- Master (Shingo Okabayashi) - Ryuta Sato
- Ani (Kizashi Sasaki) - Takashi Tsukamoto
- Mouko - Wakana Sakai
- Kaoru Nekota - Sadao Abe
- Yamaguchi-senpai - Tomomitsu Yamaguchi
- Mirei Asada - Hiroko Yakushimaru
- The cafe owner - Daisuke Shima
- Sasaki Jun (Ani's brother) - Hiroki Narimiya
- Rose (The Second Generation Kisarazu Rose) - Aiko Morishita
- Ojii / Ozu Yujirou & Shintaro - Arata Furuta
- Kousuke Tabuchi (Bussan's Father) - Fumiyo Kohinata
- Setsuko (Master's wife) - Mihoko Sunouchi
- Miiko (Ucchi's girl) - Kami Hiraikawa
- Ichiko - Yumiko Nosono
- Takeda (Police Officer) - Hiroki Miyake
- Vice Principal - Yasuhito Hida
- Kishidan (氣志團) playing a fictional version of themselves in episode 7
- You (actress) - Asari Mizuki

== Episodes ==
No.	Title	Original release date
1	"Phantom Thief Corps Visit! (怪盗団参上！)"	18 January 2002
2	"Chaca Recapture Operation (チャカ奪回作戦)"	25 January 2002
3	"My Son Will Die!? (僕の息子が死ぬ!?)"	1 February 2002
4	"The First Mr. Kisarazu (町で一番の色男)"	8 February 2002
5	"I May Already Seriously Dying (俺もうマジ死んでもいい)"	15 February 2002
6	"Good-bye Ozu-senpai (さよなら小津先輩)"	22 February 2002
7	"My First and Last Night! (最初で最後の夜！)"	1 March 2002
8	"My heart was stolen (俺のハートが盗まれた)"	8 March 2002
9	"I'm Not Dead Yet! (俺まだ死ねねえや!)"	15 March 2002
