= Eureka (2000 film) =

- Film poster
- Directed by: Shinji Aoyama
- Written by: Shinji Aoyama
- Produced by: Takenori Sento
- Starring: Kōji Yakusho; Aoi Miyazaki; Masaru Miyazaki; Yoichiro Saito
- Cinematography: Masaki Tamura
- Edited by: Shinji Aoyama
- Music by: Isao Yamada; Shinji Aoyama
- Release dates: 18 May 2000 (Cannes); 20 January 2001 (Japan)
- Running time: 218 minutes
- Country: Japan
- Language: Japanese

Eureka is a 2000 Japanese epic drama film written and directed by Shinji Aoyama. It stars Kōji Yakusho, Aoi Miyazaki, and Masaru Miyazaki. It won the FIPRESCI Prize and Prize of the Ecumenical Jury at the 2000 Cannes Film Festival. It was released in Japan on 20 January 2001.

== Plot ==
Eureka is a drama set mainly in rural Kyushu, Japan, and is almost entirely shot in sepia tone. It tells the story of the lasting effects of a violent experience on three people, a teenage brother and sister, Naoki and Kozue Tamura and a bus driver, Makoto Sawai. These three are the sole survivors after the bus is hijacked by a gunman. The actual violent events which traumatise them are not shown in detail. The extent to which the three have been affected slowly becomes apparent. Naoki and Kozue do not return to school, do not speak and become dissociated from their parents. Some time after the hijack, their mother abandons the family. Later their father is killed in a car crash. It is not clear whether his death is suicide. The two children continue to live alone in the family home. Meanwhile, Makoto is finding it impossible to carry on normal life and takes to the road, leaving his estranged wife living in the family home with his elderly father, elder brother, his wife and their daughter. After some time, Makoto returns home to find that his wife has left him. He cannot return to driving a bus and takes a job as a day-labourer with an old school-friend.

Relationships between Makoto and his brother begin to deteriorate and Makoto moves in with Naoki and Kozue. He takes over the housekeeping and makes sure they eat properly. Kozue now begins to communicate a little but Naoki remains mute. The detective who dealt with the hijacking begins to harass Makoto about the murder of a woman in the neighbourhood, apparently without any evidence. While Makoto is out at work one day, the children's older student cousin Akihiko arrives and states he intends to stay to look after the children. He and Makoto are uneasy with each other but the four people settle down into a kind of family arrangement.

A further murder takes place and this time the victim is a friend of Makoto's. He is arrested and questioned by the detective but is finally released. He talks to his friend and co-worker about his wish to return to driving and forms a plan to get all of them, Naoki, Kozue, Akihiko and himself away from their troubles. He buys an old bus which they convert for living accommodation and they all set off on an extended tour of the island. Kozue becomes more relaxed as they travel around but Naoki appears more disturbed. It eventually becomes clear that it is Naoki who is the murderer. Makoto confronts him and persuades him to give himself up. The remaining three carry on with the journey until Makoto finally loses his temper with Akihiko's cynical and shallow outlook and throws him off the bus. Makoto and Kozue continue on their journey until, finally, when they reach the peak of the highest mountain in Kyushu, both realise they are able to face ordinary life again. As they reach this understanding the film turns to colour.

== Cast ==
- Kōji Yakusho as Makoto Sawai
- Aoi Miyazaki as Kozue Tamura
- Masaru Miyazaki as Naoki Tamura
- Yoichiro Saito as Akihiko
- Sayuri Kokushō as Yumiko
- Ken Mitsuishi as Shigeo
- Gō Rijū as Busjack Man
- Yutaka Matsushige as Matsuoka
- Sansei Shiomi as Yoshiyuki Sawai
- Kimie Shingyoji as Mother
- Eihi Shiina as Keiko Kono
- Machiko Ono as Mikiko Sawai
- Denden as Yoshida

== Production ==
For Eureka, writer and director Shinji Aoyama got inspiration from the 1995 Tokyo subway sarin attack. According to The Guardian, his research "also took in accounts of Holocaust survivors and studies of Israeli terrorists, as well as his own experiences of growing up in a society of widening generation gaps." Aoyama stated that he was influenced by Alain Resnais's film Hiroshima mon amour, John Ford's film The Searchers, Sonic Youth's album Daydream Nation, and Jim O'Rourke's album Eureka. The film was shot in black-and-white and printed in color. Filming took place in Kyushu. The last scene was shot near the volcano Mount Aso.

== Release ==
The film had its world premiere in the Competition section at the 2000 Cannes Film Festival on 18 May 2000. It was released in Japan on 20 January 2001. It was released in the United States on 4 May 2001.

== Reception ==
=== Critical response ===
On review aggregator website Rotten Tomatoes, the film holds an approval rating of 90% based on 42 reviews, with a weighted average of 7.2/10. The website's critical consensus reads, "With its subtitles and a running time nearing four hours, Eureka certainly places demands upon its viewers. For those with the patience, however, this visually lovely film builds to an emotionally resonant vision of transcendence." On Metacritic, the film has a weighted average score of 78 out of 100, based on 22 critics, indicating "generally favorable reviews".

Jamie Russell of BBC gave the film 4 out of 5 stars, writing, "Shinji Aoyama expertly creates tension out of nothing, building upon his slightly off-kilter set-up with a series of languorous long takes that emphasise the film's disturbing stretches of stillness." Michael Wilmington of Chicago Tribune gave the film 3 out of 4 stars, stating that "its vision is unique and harrowing, its song hits to the heart." Amy Taubin of The Village Voice wrote, "What's so extraordinary about Eureka is that it makes one believe that intimate human connections are possible, that empathy is worth struggling for, and that propriety and hipster cynicism alike must fall by the wayside en route to unconditional love."

Film Comment placed it at number 19 on the "20 Best Films of 2001" list.

=== Accolades ===
Award	Year of ceremony	Category	Recipient(s)	Result	Ref(s)
Camerimage	2000	Golden Frog	Masaki Tamura	Nominated	
Cannes Film Festival	2000				
Cannes Film Festival	2000	Prize of the Ecumenical Jury	Eureka	Won	
Cannes Film Festival	2000	FIPRESCI Prize	Eureka	Won	
Singapore International Film Festival	2001	Best Asian Feature	Eureka	Won	
Japanese Professional Movie Awards	2002	Best Newcomer	Aoi Miyazaki	Won	
