= Mago Mago Arashi =

- まごまご嵐
- Genre: Variety show
- Starring: Arashi
- Country of origin: Japan
- Original language: Japanese
- No. of episodes: 125

Production
- Running time: 30 minutes

Original release
- Network: Fuji Television
- Release: April 9, 2005 – October 6, 2007

Related
- Arashi no Waza-ari (2004–2005); GRA (2007–2008)

Mago Mago Arashi (まごまご嵐, Grandchildren Arashi) was a Japanese variety show that ran from April 9, 2005 to October 6, 2007 on Fuji TV. Aired from 13:00 to 13:30 (JST), it was the third variety show on Fuji TV to feature the musical idol group Arashi.

== Segments ==
=== Being Grandchildren for a Day ===
Ichi Nichi Mago ni Narimasu (1日孫になります) in Japanese. Two members would pair up and visit the home of an elderly couple, who would be their "grandparents" for the day. The two would act as their fill in grandchildren and split up to help or spend time with either the grandfather or grandmother do chores, cook lunch or work. Usually after lunch, there would be a "Love-Love Talk" consisting of stories of the grandparents' love stories such as their first kiss, first date, marriage and impressions of each other. By the end of the day, the grandfather would usually present the grandmother a gift after some urging on the grandchildren's part, and the grandchildren themselves would each present a gift to their grandparents before leaving.

=== Chinese Lessons ===
Chūkagai Ryūgaku (中華街留学) in Japanese. Arashi and one guest would take lessons in Mandarin from a teacher. With a theme, the members and guest study basic Mandarin within a limited time and demonstrate their abilities through a test. The person who did the poorest would have to review the lesson by himself in the end.

=== Arashi's Castle Town ===
Arashi no Jōkamachi (嵐の城下町) in Japanese. Two members would visit different castles of Japan.

=== Arashi's Assault: Children's Dinner ===
Arashi no Totsugeki Kodomo no Ban Gohan (嵐の突撃こどもの晩ゴハン) in Japanese. While the parents go out on a date, two members would engage in a cooking battle against each other and have the children judge whose dish tasted better. At the parents' request, the theme of the dinner would usually be something the children dislikes eating such as cooked bell peppers or eggplants. The loser of the battle would have to clean up the kitchen by himself and, when the parents return, the members would present them a menu of what their children had for dinner with a short message from each member below the photo of their respective dish.

=== Arashi's Edo Life Exploration ===
Arashi no O-Edo Hakkenden (嵐のお江戸発見伝) in Japanese. A pair of Arashi members and another pair of guests would take a map of Edo and compete against each other to find different locations of Edo in modern-day Tokyo.

== Specials ==
=== Mago Mago Boating Club ===
A special that followed the group's three-month progress of learning rowing without any prior experience in order to fulfill the wish of a "grandfather" from one of their Being Grandchildren for a Day segments and training for an official rowing competition.

== Episode guide ==
2005
#	Air date	Segment	Focus	Members
1	2005-04-09	Being Grandchildren for a Day	Making Mochi	Sakurai, Aiba
2	2005-04-16	Chinese Lessons	Restaurant	Arashi
3	2005-04-23	Being Grandchildren for a Day	Poultry farming	Ohno, Sakurai
4	2005-04-30	Chinese Lessons	Massage	Arashi
5	2005-05-07	Being Grandchildren for a Day	Minishuku	Sakurai, Aiba
6	2005-05-14	Chinese Lessons	Tea House	Arashi
7	2005-05-21	Being Grandchildren for a Day	Fisherman, sea diver	Ohno, Ninomiya
8	2005-05-28	Chinese Lessons	Shopping	Arashi
9	2005-06-04	Being Grandchildren for a Day	Rice harvest, Japanese yams	Aiba, Ninomiya
10	2005-06-11	Being Grandchildren for a Day	Comic Dialogue	Ninomiya, Sakurai
11	2005-06-18	Being Grandchildren for a Day	Dairy farming	Ohno, Sakurai
12	2005-06-25	Being Grandchildren for a Day	Judo house	Ohno, Matsumoto
13	2005-07-02	Being Grandchildren for a Day	Souvenir shop	Ohno, Ninomiya
14	2005-07-09	Being Grandchildren for a Day	Cherry tomatoes	Aiba, Ninomiya
15	2005-07-16	Being Grandchildren for a Day	Photography	Sakurai, Matsumoto
16	2005-07-23	Being Grandchildren for a Day	Great grandmother, fireflies	Ninomiya, Matsumoto
17	2005-07-30	Being Grandchildren for a Day	Reunion outing	Ohno, Matsumoto
18	2005-08-06	Being Grandchildren for a Day	Acerola	Ohno, Ninomiya
19	2005-08-13	Being Grandchildren for a Day	Bicycle training	Sakurai, Ninomiya
20	2005-08-20	Being Grandchildren for a Day	Taiga drama	Ohno, Sakurai
21	2005-08-27	Being Grandchildren for a Day	Baseball	Ohno, Matsumoto
22	2005-09-10	Being Grandchildren for a Day	Cheerleading	Ohno, Ninomiya
23	2005-09-24	Being Grandchildren for a Day	Rowing	Ohno, Sakurai
23	2005-09-24	Mago Mago Rowing Club	Introduction to rowing	Arashi
24	2005-10-01	Being Grandchildren for a Day	Banquet	Sakurai, Ninomiya
25	2005-10-08	Being Grandchildren for a Day	Sweet Potato Farming, Barrel Making	Sakurai, Matsumoto
26	2005-10-15	Being Grandchildren for a Day	Apple farm	Sakurai, Ninomiya
27	2005-10-22	Being Grandchildren for a Day	Lotus root farmhouse	Sakurai, Aiba
28	2005-10-29	Being Grandchildren for a Day	Bear master	Aiba, Ninomiya
29	2005-11-12	Mago Mago Boating Club	Training	Arashi
30	2005-11-19	Mago Mago Boating Club	Training	Arashi
31	2005-11-26	Mago Mago Boating Club	Training	Arashi
32	2005-12-03	Mago Mago Boating Club	Training	Arashi
33	2005-12-10	Being Grandchildren for a Day	Traditional dance	Ninomiya, Ohno
33	2005-12-10	Mago Mago Boating Club	Training Camp	Arashi
34	2005-12-17	Mago Mago Boating Club	Final training, competition	Arashi
35	2005-12-24	Mago Mago Boating Club	Final training, competition	Arashi

2006
#	Air date	Segment	Focus	Members
36	2006-01-07	Being Grandchildren for a Day	Tofu factory	Ohno, Aiba
37	2006-01-14	Being Grandchildren for a Day	Strawberry farm	Ohno, Ninomiya
38	2006-01-21	Being Grandchildren for a Day	Nattō	Aiba, Matsumoto
39	2006-01-28	Being Grandchildren for a Day	Snow shoveling	Ohno, Matsumoto
40	2006-02-04	Being Grandchildren for a Day	Ostrich farm	Aiba, Matsumoto
41	2006-02-11	Being Grandchildren for a Day	Agar	Ohno, Matsumoto
42	2006-02-18	Being Grandchildren for a Day	Boat carpentry	Aiba, Matsumoto
43	2006-02-25	Being Grandchildren for a Day	Carnation farmer	Aiba, Ninomiya
44	2006-03-04	Being Grandchildren for a Day	Seaweed fishing, restaurant work	Ninomiya, Matsumoto
45	2006-03-11	Being Grandchildren for a Day	Goats	Ohno, Ninomiya
46	2006-03-18	Castle Town	Kakegawa Castle	Arashi
47	2006-03-25	Grandparents Date Special		Arashi
48	2006-04-01	Castle Town	Tateyama Castle	Ohno, Aiba
49	2006-04-08	Being Grandchildren for a Day	Doll craftsman	Ohno, Ninomiya
50	2006-04-15	Being Grandchildren for a Day	Gaikokujin grandparents	Ohno, Aiba
51	2006-04-22	Castle Town	Aizuwakamatsu Castle	Ohno, Aiba
52	2006-04-29	Being Grandchildren for a Day	Bamboo shoots	Ohno, Aiba
53	2006-05-06	Castle Town	Odawara Castle	Sakurai, Matsumoto
54	2006-05-13	Being Grandchildren for a Day	Cabbage harvest	Ohno, Sakurai
55	2006-05-20	Castle Town	Matsumoto Castle	Ohno, Aiba
56	2006-05-27	Being Grandchildren for a Day	Picking oranges, kendo match	Sakurai, Ninomiya
57	2006-06-03	Castle Town	Inuyama Castle	Aiba, Ninomiya
58	2006-06-10	Being Grandchildren for a Day	Buckwheat noodle house	Ohno, Sakurai
59	2006-06-17	Castle Town	Nagahama Castle	Ohno, Aiba
60	2006-06-24	Being Grandchildren for a Day	Bracken	Sakurai, Ninomiya
61	2006-07-01	Castle Town	Castle Special	Aiba, Ninomiya
62	2006-07-08	Being Grandchildren for a Day	Tea garden	Ohno, Matsumoto
63	2006-07-15	Castle Town	Kawagoe Castle	Sakurai, Matsumoto
64	2006-07-22	Being Grandchildren for a Day	Castles	Aiba, Matsumoto
65	2006-07-29	Castle Town	Ōtaki Castle	Sakurai, Aiba
66	2006-08-05	Being Grandchildren for a Day	Kabuki circles	Ohno, Matsumoto
67	2006-08-12	Castle Town	Takasaki Castle	Ninomiya, Matsumoto
68	2006-08-19	Being Grandchildren for a Day	Summer vacation	Sakurai, Ninomiya
69	2006-08-26	Grandparents Date Special 2		Arashi
70	2006-09-02	Castle Town	Ueda Castle	Ohno, Matsumoto
71	2006-09-09	Being Grandchildren for a Day	Peach farm	Aiba, Matsumoto
72	2006-09-16	Being Grandchildren for a Day	Sea fishing, Night barbecue	Aiba, Sakurai
73	2006-09-23	Being Grandchildren for a Day	Horse coach	Ohno, Ninomiya
74	2006-09-30	Castle Town	Nijō Castle	Ohno, Sakurai
75	2006-10-07	Children's Dinner	Eggplant battle	Sakurai, Aiba
76	2006-10-21	90-minute Special		Arashi
77	2006-10-28	Being Grandchildren for a Day	Vineyard	Aiba, Ninomiya
78	2006-11-04	Children's Dinner	Green pepper battle	Aiba, Matsumoto
79	2006-11-11	Being Grandchildren for a Day	Mushroom picking	Ohno, Sakurai
80	2006-11-18	Children's Dinner	Mushrooms battle	Aiba, Ninomiya
81	2006-11-25	Being Grandchildren for a Day	Garland chrysanthemum farm	Sakurai, Aiba
82	2006-12-02	Children's Dinner	Meat dish battle	Ohno, Ninomiya
83	2006-12-09	Being Grandchildren for a Day	Tatami worker	Aiba, Matsumoto
84	2006-12-16	Children's Dinner	Fish dish battle	Ohno, Matsumoto
85	2006-12-23	Christmas Special		Arashi

2007
#	Air date	Segment	Focus	Members
86	2007-01-06	Being Grandchildren for a Day	Picking mandarin oranges, preparation for New Years	Sakurai, Aiba
87	2007-01-13	Children's Dinner	Grilled fish battle	Sakurai, Aiba
88	2007-01-20	Being Grandchildren for a Day	Kites	Ohno, Ninomiya
89	2007-01-27	Children's Dinner	Low calorie battle	Ninomiya, Matsumoto
90	2007-02-03	Being Grandchildren for a Day	Portable shrine craftsman	Ohno, Sakurai
91	2007-02-10	Children's Dinner	Donburi battle	Sakurai, Aiba
92	2007-02-17	Being Grandchildren for a Day	Shiitake	Ohno, Aiba
93	2007-02-24	Edo Life Exploration	Nihonbashi	Sakurai, Aiba
94	2007-03-03	Children's Dinner	Tuna battle	Ohno, Sakurai
95	2007-03-10	Edo Life Exploration	Akasaka	Ohno, Aiba
96	2007-03-17	Being Grandchildren for a Day	Green onion farming, softball	Sakurai, Aiba
97	2007-03-24	Children's Dinner	Chinese cuisine battle	Ohno, Aiba
98	2007-03-31	Edo Life Exploration	Yotsuya	Ohno, Sakurai
99	2007-04-07	Being Grandchildren for a Day	Secret marriage	Ohno, Aiba
100	2007-04-14	Children's Dinner	Seafood battle	Aiba, Matsumoto
101	2007-04-21	101st Episode Special		Arashi
102	2007-04-28	Being Grandchildren for a Day	Lake Yamanaka picnic	Aiba, Ninomiya
103	2007-05-05	Edo Life Exploration	Shiba, Atago, Minato	Ohno, Sakurai
104	2007-05-12	Children's Dinner	Green pepper battle	Sakurai, Ninomiya
105	2007-05-19	Being Grandchildren for a Day	Bed and breakfast	Ohno, Sakurai
106	2007-05-26	Edo Life Exploration	Shinjuku	Ohno, Aiba
107	2007-06-02	Children's Dinner	Vegetable dish battle	Ohno, Aiba
108	2007-06-09	Being Grandchildren for a Day	Broom expert	Sakurai, Ninomiya
109	2007-06-16	Edo Life Exploration	Ueno	Ohno, Aiba
110	2007-06-23	Children's Dinner		Ohno, Aiba
111	2007-06-30	Being Grandchildren for a Day	Bathhouse	Ohno, Aiba
112	2007-07-07	Edo Life Exploration	Ginza	Ohno, Aiba
113	2007-07-14	Children's Dinner		Ohno, Aiba
114	2007-07-21	Being Grandchildren for a Day	Mowing	Ohno, Aiba
115	2007-07-28	Edo Life Exploration	Asakusa	Ohno, Aiba
116	2007-08-04	Children's Dinner	Pasta battle	Aiba, Matsumoto
117	2007-08-11	Being Grandchildren for a Day	Ranchu	Ohno, Aiba
118	2007-08-18	Being Grandchildren for a Day	Beach hut	Ohno, Matsumoto
119	2007-08-25	Edo Life Exploration	Fukagawa	Ohno, Matsumoto
120	2007-09-01	Children's Dinner	Nattō battle	Ohno, Matsumoto
121	2007-09-08	Being Grandchildren for a Day	Kanpyō	Aiba, Matsumoto
122	2007-09-15	Children's Dinner	Vegetable dish battle	Ohno, Matsumoto
123	2007-09-22	Edo Life Exploration	Hongō	Ohno, Aiba
124	2007-09-29	Being Grandchildren for a Day		Ohno, Matsumoto
125	2007-10-06	Last Episode Special	Recap of past episodes	Arashi
125	2007-10-06	Being Grandchildren for a Day	Reunion with grandparents from episode 49	Ohno, Ninomiya

== Staff ==
- Producer: Toshio Ri (李 闘士男, Ri Toshio)
- Organizer: Yōko Matsuzaki (松崎容子, Matsuzaki Yōko)
- Narrators: Chiyo Abe (阿部知代, Abe Chiyo), Toshihiro Ito (伊藤利尋, Ito Toshihiro)
