= Tōki Rakujitsu =

- Theatrical release poster
- Directed by: Seijirō Kōyama
- Written by: Kaneto Shindō (novel); Kaneto Shindō; Junichi Watanabe
- Produced by: Kazuyoshi Okuyama
- Starring: Hiroshi Mikami; Yoshiko Mita; Chōichirō Kawarazaki; Riho Makise; Tetsuko Kobayashi; Julie Dreyfus; Takahiro Tamura; Tatsuya Nakadai
- Edited by: Osamu Inoue
- Music by: Tetsuji Hayashi
- Distributed by: Shochiku
- Release date: July 4, 1992 (Japan)
- Running time: 119 minutes
- Country: Japan
- Language: Japanese

Tōki Rakujitsu (Japanese: 遠き落日; lit Faraway Sunset) is a 1992 Japanese film directed by Seijirō Kōyama. It is about the Japanese scientist Hideyo Noguchi. It is based on two biographical novels: Tōki Rakujitsu written by Junichi Watanabe and Noguchi no haha: Noguchi Hideo Monogatari written by Kaneto Shindō. The screenplay was written by Kaneto Shindō. It stars Hiroshi Mikami.

== Cast ==
- Yoshiko Mita - Shika Noguchi
- Hiroshi Mikami - Noguchi
- Tatsuya Nakadai - Kobayashi
- Riho Makise - Yoneko Yamauchi
- Takahiro Tamura - Ryutaro
- Choichiro Kawarasaki
- Shingo Yamashiro - Watanabe
- Toshinori Omi
- Hiroyuki Nagato
- Kojiro Kusanagi
- Masumi Harukawa
- Julie Dreyfus - Mary
