= Hiroshi Mikami =

Japanese actor (born 1962)

- 三上 博史
- Born: 23 July 1962 (age 63)
- Occupation: Actor
- Years active: 1979–present

Hiroshi Mikami (三上 博史, Mikami Hiroshi; born 23 July 1962) is a Japanese actor.

== Early life and career ==
Mikami grew up in the 1960s with a family that was closely related to the entertainment industry with his mother being an actress and his uncle being a film producer. Mikami was in high school where he went for his first audition and earned the lead role in Grass Labyrinth directed by Shuji Terayama. The film won critical praise in France where it became part of the trilogy Collections privées.

Mikami went on to star in various projects, including the television comedy Kimi no Hitomi wo Taiho Suru and the film Desert Moon, which screened in competition at the 2000 Cannes Film Festival. He also has worked in stage, as in 2004, when he played the titular Hedwig in the Japanese version of Hedwig and the Angry Inch.

== Filmography ==
=== Film ===
- Grass Labyrinth (1979)
- Merry Christmas, Mr. Lawrence (1983)
- Take Me Out to the Snowland (1987)
- Peacock King (1988)
- Tōki Rakujitsu (1992)
- Swallowtail (1996)
- Parasite Eve (1997)
- Tokyo Decadence (1991)
- Desert Moon (2001)
- Premonition (2004)
- Mori, The Artist's Habitat (2018)
- Love Hotel ni okeru Jōji to Plan no Hate (2019)

=== Television ===
- Chance (1993)
- Operation Love (2007)
- Taira no Kiyomori (2012), Emperor Toba
- Trembling Cow (2013), Shin'ichi Tagawa
- Everyone's Demoted (2019), Teruo Yokoyama
- Okehazama (2021), Imagawa Yoshimoto
- Tanabata no Kuni (2024), Masami Marukami

== Awards ==
Year	Award	Category	Work(s)	Result	Ref.
1989	13th Elan d'or Awards	Newcomer of the Year	Himself	Won	

== Sources ==
- Cortina, Sarah (22 July 2009). "Actor Hiroshi Mikami surprises fans once again in new TV movie 'Yukai'". Japan Today.
