= Tsure ga Utsu ni Narimashite =

Japanese manga

- Manga
- Written by: Tenten Hosokawa
- Published by: Gentosha
- Published: 2006
- Television drama
- Original network: NHK
- Original run: May 29, 2009 – June 12, 2009
- Episodes: 3
- Live-action film
- Directed by: Kiyoshi Sasabe
- Released: October 8, 2011

Tsure ga Utsu ni Narimashite (ツレがうつになりまして。; My S. O. Has Got Depression) is a Japanese manga written and illustrated by Tenten Hosokawa. It was adapted into a live-action television series in 2009 and a live-action film in 2011.

== Cast ==
- Norika Fujiwara (TV series), Aoi Miyazaki (film)
- Taizo Harada (TV series), Masato Sakai (film)

=== Film 2011 cast ===
- Aoi Miyazaki as Haruko Takasaki
- Masato Sakai as Mikio Takasaki
- Hiroshi Inuzuka as Kawaji
- Kanji Tsuda as Kazuo Takasaki
- Ren Osugi as Yasuo Kurita
