= Kamisama no Karute =

- Poster
- Directed by: Yoshihiro Fukagawa
- Written by: Noriko Gotō
- Story by: Sosuke Natsukawa
- Produced by: Akio Kobayashi; Yutaka Onishi; Julie K. Fujishima; Koji Ishida; Tomoko Machida; Minami Ichikawa
- Starring: Sho Sakurai; Aoi Miyazaki
- Cinematography: Kosuke Yamada
- Edited by: Naoya Bandō
- Music by: Suguru Matsutani
- Distributed by: Toho
- Release date: 27 August 2011 (Japan)
- Running time: 128 minutes
- Country: Japan
- Language: Japanese
- Box office: $23,384,864

Kamisama no Karute (Japanese: 神様のカルテ), also known as In His Chart, is a 2011 Japanese film directed by Yoshihiro Fukagawa. It is based on a bestselling novel of the same name written by Sosuke Natsukawa.

== Plot ==
Dr. Ichito Kurihara (Sho Sakurai) works at a clinic in Nagano Prefecture. He rarely has any free time due to the clinic's shortage of doctors and the constant influx of patients. He even sometimes diagnoses patients out of his area of specialty and sometimes goes days without sleeping. He hopes to work at a major hospital where he can get more free time to spend with his wife, Haruna (Aoi Miyazaki), and to specialize in his field of study. However, he is also reluctant to add to shortage of doctors at the clinic and break his relationships with the patients.

One day, he clears out the belongings of a terminal cancer patient who died and discovers a letter written to him thanking him for the care he provided to her, even though he could not cure her sickness. He then has a revelation about the medical chart he keeps in his hand - filled with personal observations and concerns.

== Cast ==
- Sho Sakurai, from the band Arashi, stars in this film as Ichito Kurihara. Kurihara is a physician who works at a clinic in Nagano Prefecture.
- Aoi Miyazaki plays Haruna, Kurihara's wife and a mountain photographer.
- Jun Kaname
- Michiko Kichise
- Yoshinori Okada
- Aki Asakura
- Taizo Harada
- Tokuma Nishioka
- Chizuru Ikewaki
- Mariko Kaga
- Akira Emoto

== Release ==
Kamisama no Karute was released in Japanese cinemas on 27 August 2011 on 321 screens.

== Reception ==
=== Box office ===
Kamisama no Karute grossed around 302.85 million yen on its first weekend, making it the highest-grossing film in the Japanese box office for the weekend of 27–28 August 2011. About 240,000 went to watch the film over the weekend, of whom over half were middle school students. According to the film's official website, females outnumbered the male audience by a ratio of 93 to 7. It reached the 1 million audience mark on 13 September 2011.
