= Shinji Aoyama =

Japanese film director (1964–2022)

- Born: 13 July 1964; Kitakyushu, Fukuoka Prefecture, Japan
- Died: 21 March 2022 (aged 57); Tokyo, Japan
- Occupations: Film director, screenwriter, composer, film critic, novelist
- Spouse: Maho Toyota (m. 2002)

Shinji Aoyama (青山 真治, Aoyama Shinji; 13 July 1964 – 21 March 2022) was a Japanese film director, screenwriter, composer, film critic, and novelist. He graduated from Rikkyo University. He won two awards at the 2000 Cannes Film Festival for his film Eureka.

== Biography ==
Shinji Aoyama was born in Kitakyushu, Fukuoka Prefecture, Japan. He began to be interested in cinema when he watched Apocalypse Now and he thought seriously about making films after watching Jean-Luc Godard's films such as Pierrot le Fou and Two or Three Things I Know About Her. He graduated from Rikkyo University, where he was deeply influenced by the film critic Shigehiko Hasumi, from whom he took classes.

After graduating, Aoyama worked as an assistant director to Swiss film director Daniel Schmid, Japanese director Kiyoshi Kurosawa and Icelandic director Fridrik Thor Fridriksson. He made his directorial debut with the V-Cinema production It's Not in the Textbook! in 1995.

In 1996, Aoyama made Helpless, which is his first feature film. His 2000 film Eureka, also set in Fukuoka, opened at the 2000 Cannes Film Festival where it received both the FIPRESCI prize and the Prize of the Ecumenical Jury. Together with the 2007 film Sad Vacation, Eureka and Helpless comprise Aoyama's "Kitakyushu Saga." In 2011, he returned with the romance film Tokyo Park, which won the special Golden Leopard award at the 64th Locarno International Film Festival to honor his whole career. His next film, The Backwater, was released in 2013.

Aoyama's literary output includes his 2001 novelization of Eureka, which won the Yukio Mishima Prize, as well as the novel Hotel Chronicles, which was nominated for the Noma Literary Prize in 2005. He has also contributed as a critic to Cahiers du Cinéma Japon and Esquire Japan.

As of 2012, he became a professor in the Department of Moving Images and Performing Arts at Tama Art University.

He was married to Japanese actress Maho Toyota, who played a leading role in Desert Moon.

Aoyama died on March 21, 2022, of esophageal cancer.

== Style and influences ==
Mark Schilling of The Japan Times described Aoyama as "A smart, dedicated cinephile who works his influences into his films while experimenting with various genres".

Aoyama stated that the origin of the desire to continue the story in "Kitakyushu Saga" is François Truffaut, a French film director who used the same character (Antoine Doinel) in some of his films.

Aoyama listed F. W. Murnau's Faust and Nicholas Ray's Johnny Guitar as two of the Greatest Films of All Time in 2012. Regarding Faust he said, "I always want to remember that movies are made out of the joy of the replica. The fascination of movies is not their realism, but how to enjoy the 'real'. In that sense, I always have Faust in my mind as I face a movie, make a movie, and talk about a movie." Regarding Johnny Guitar he said, "Johnny Guitar is the only movie that I'd like to remake someday, although I know that it's impossible. It's probably closest to the worst nightmare I can have. I know for sure that my desire to remake this movie comes from my warped thought that I want to remake my own nightmare."

== Filmography ==
=== Fiction feature films ===
- Helpless (1996)
- Two Punks (1996)
- Wild Life (1997)
- An Obsession (1997)
- Shady Grove (1999)
- EM Embalming (1999)
- Eureka (2000)
- Desert Moon (2001)
- Mike Yokohama: A Forest with No Name (2002)
- Lakeside Murder Case (2004)
- My God, My God, Why Hast Thou Forsaken Me? (2005)
- Crickets (2006)
- Sad Vacation (2007)
- Tokyo Park (2011)
- The Backwater (2013)
- Living in the Sky (2020)

=== Fiction short films ===
- Trunk (2003)
- The Detective Who Can Say No (2003)
- Like a Desperado Under the Eaves (2003)
- Days in the Shade (2003)
- Le Petit Chaperon Rouge (2008)
- 60 Seconds of Solitude in Year Zero (segment) (2011)

=== Documentary feature films ===
- To the Backstreet: The Films Kenji Nakagami Left Out (2001)
- Song of Ajima (2003)
- AA (2005)

=== Documentary short films ===
- 1/5 (1996) (8 min, from omnibus film Celebrate Cinema 101)
- To the Alley (2000)
- Down (2010)

=== Videos ===
- It's Not in the Textbook! (1995)
- A Weapon in My Heart (1996)
- 12 June 1998 (1999) – also known as At the Edge of Chaos
- So as Not to Say Everything About Her Already Aged Self (2001)

=== Television ===
- The Jesus of the Ruins (2001)
- The Private Detective Mike (2002)
- D x Town (episode "Spiders Now") (2012)
- 4 for Flowers (2013)
- Shokuzai no Sonata (mini-series, 4 episodes) (2015)
- Kingyo Hime (2020)

== Bibliography ==
=== Novels ===
- Eureka (2000)
- Tsuki no Sabaku (2002)
- Helpless (2002)
- Hotel Chronicles (2005)
- Shi no Tani '95 (2005)
- Ugetsu Monogatari (2006)
- Sad Vacation (2006)
- Entertainment! (2007)
- Chikyu no Ue de Visa mo Naku (2009)
- Kaerimichi ga Kieta (2010)
- Strange Face (2010)

=== Criticism ===
- Lost in America (2000)
- Wim Wenders (2000)
- Ware Eiga o Hakken Seri (2001)
  - Aoyama, Shinji (2015). "Nouvelle Vague Manifesto; or, How I Became a Disciple of Philippe Garrel". Lola Journal. (English translation of chapter from Ware Eiga o Hakken Seri)
- Aoyama Shinji to Abe Kazushige to Nakahara Masaya no Cine-con! (2004)
- Cinema 21 (2010)
- Eiga Nagabanashi (2011)
