= List of songs written by Bruno Mars =

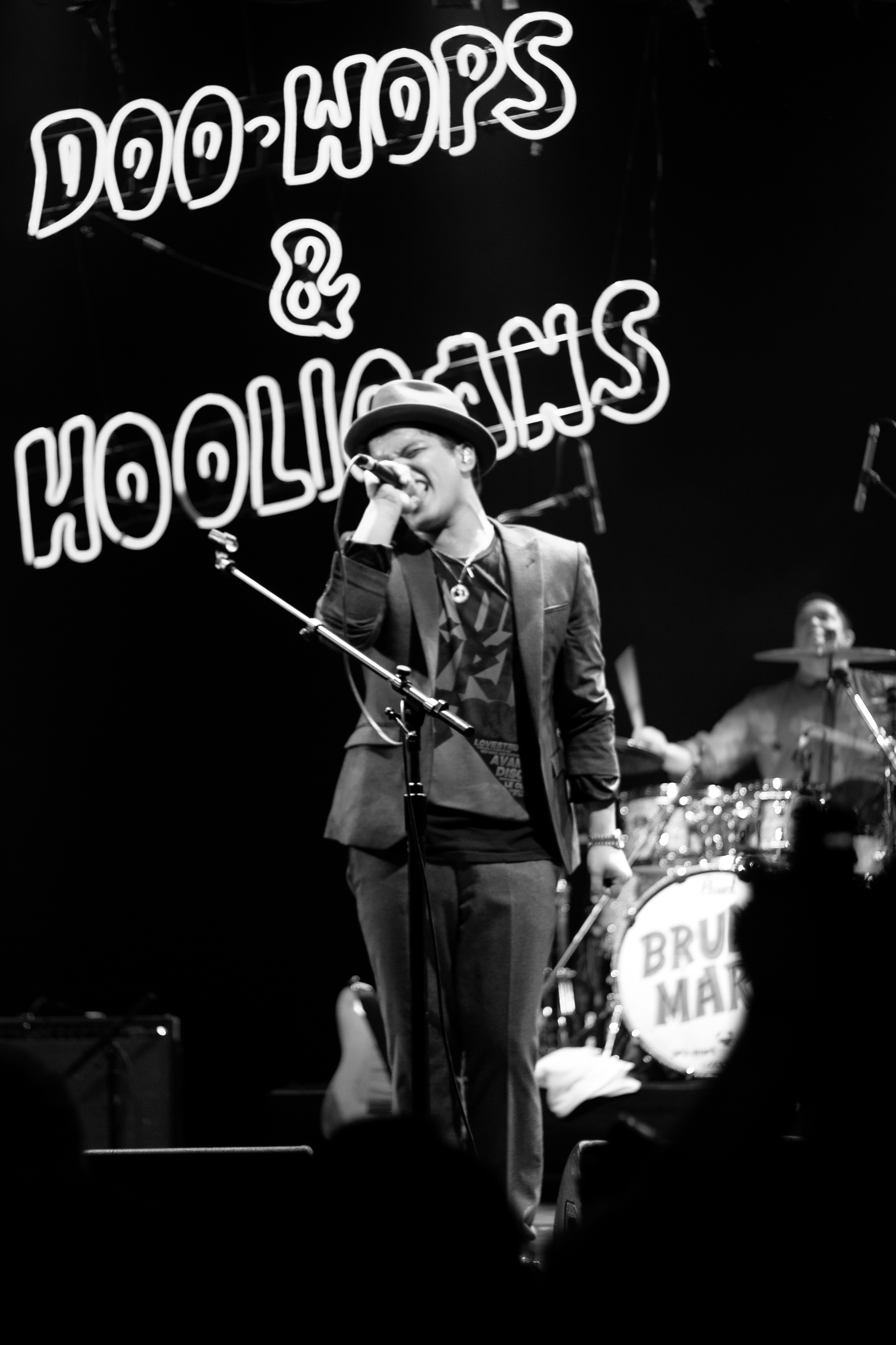
Mars performing in Houston, Texas on November 24, 2010

American singer and songwriter Bruno Mars has written songs for his extended play, four solo studio albums and one collaborative album, as well as for other artists and soundtracks. (Note: Mars is also credited as a writer by the ASCAP as Peter Gene Hernandez.) Mars came to prominence as a songwriter with Philip Lawrence and Ari Levine, as the Smeezingtons. The trio worked with various artists, notably on CeeLo Green's "Fuck You", B.o.B's "Nothin' on You" and Travie McCoy's "Billionaire" on which Mars sang the last two choruses. They also co-wrote songs for soundtracks: Mars's "It Will Rain" for The Twilight Saga: Breaking Dawn – Part 1 and "Young, Wild & Free" by Snoop Dogg and Wiz Khalifa featuring Mars for Mac & Devin Go to High School. Mars also co-wrote K'naan's "Wavin' Flag", used by Coca-Cola as the theme for the 2010 FIFA World Cup, and Matisyahu's "One Day", used as NBC's 2010 Winter Olympics theme.

The Smeezingtons wrote most of the songs on Mars's debut studio album, including the lead single, "Just the Way You Are", along with Khari Cain and Khalil Walton. The singer conceptualized the song, "there's no mind-boggling lyrics or twists in the story – they just come directly from the heart". On his second studio album, the Smeezingtons partnered with producer Jeff Bhasker, who also had a minor role in his debut record, as well as Mark Ronson, Emile Haynie and several other collaborators. Mars described making this album as "having the freedom and luxury of walking into the studio" and create "a hip-hop, R&B, soul or rock" song. Shampoo Press & Curl, a trio formed by Mars, Lawrence and Christopher Brody Brown, co-wrote all the tracks on his third studio album with other composers. Mars has said that the album was inspired by a non-existent movie that he visualized and the first single, "24K Magic", was its opening. Mars co-wrote with Anderson .Paak, as Silk Sonic, their first collaborative album titled An Evening with Silk Sonic. They enlisted record producer and songwriter D'Mile to help Mars produce the album. The duo felt "a competitive" and a friendly spirit emerged as they improved the songs written.

After co-writing several songs together with the Smeezingtons, Mars worked with different producers to write several other songs, including Ronson's "Uptown Funk" and "Feel Right", both of which appeared on Ronson's Uptown Special (2015). He also co-wrote on his collaborative singles, such as "Wake Up in the Sky" (2018) with Gucci Mane and Kodak Black, "Please Me" (2019) alongside Cardi B, "Die With a Smile" (2024) with Lady Gaga and "APT." (2024) with Rosé. Mars was one of the writers of Alicia Keys's "Tears Always Win", Adele's "All I Ask", Jay-Z & Kanye West's "Lift Off" and "Welcome Back" for the soundtrack of Rio 2. Music Week noted Mars's talent and proficiency in songwriting and awarded the Smeezingtons the honor of Biggest Songwriters of 2010. Billboard named Mars the sixth-best songwriter of 2013. In 2025, Mars won Variety's Songwriter of the Year Award. Several award shows nominated tracks he co-wrote. "Fuck You", "Grenade", "Locked Out of Heaven", "That's What I Like", "Leave the Door Open", "Die with a Smile" and "APT." were nominated at the Grammy Awards for Song of the Year. "That's What I Like" and "Leave the Door Open" won in that category.

== Songs ==
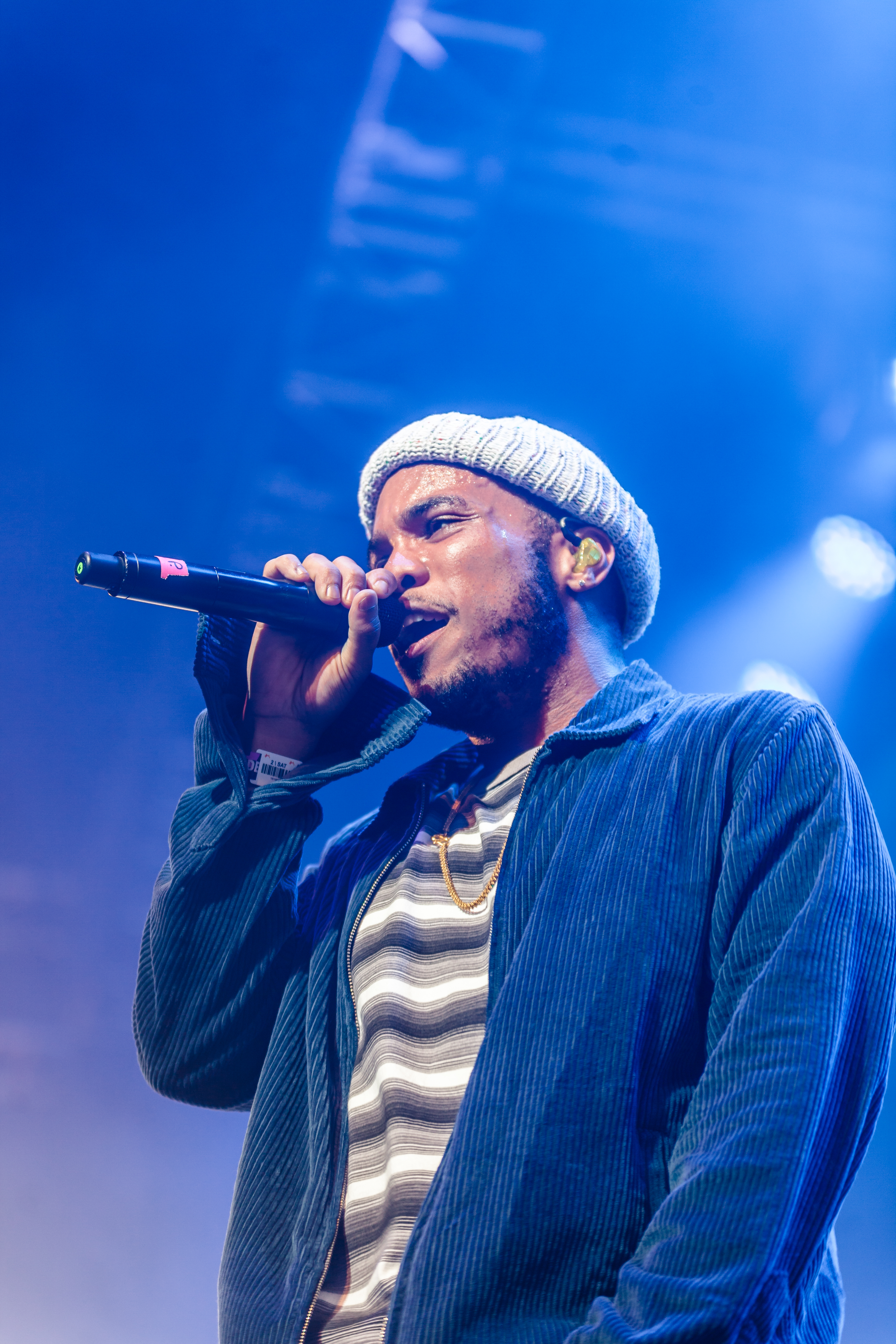
Mars and Anderson .Paak co-wrote their collaborative album, An Evening with Silk Sonic (2021). They also wrote "Anywhere" for Paak's third studio album Oxnard (2018).

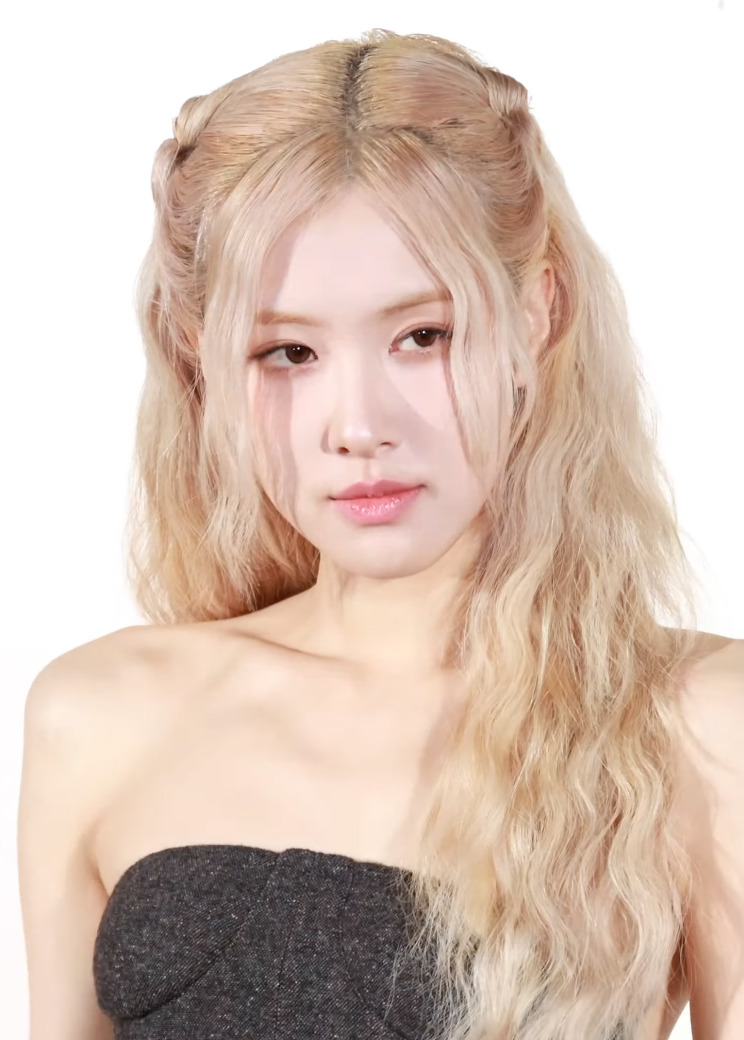
Mars and Rosé co-wrote "Number One Girl" and their collaboration "APT." for Rosé's debut studio album Rosie (2024).

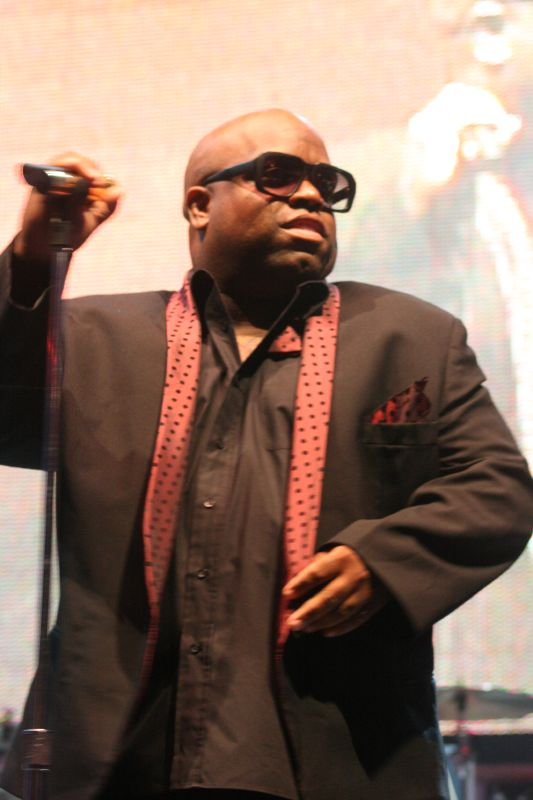
Cee-Lo Green co-wrote "Dr. Feel Good" for Travie McCoy's Lazarus (2010) with Mars. They also wrote "Fuck You" for Green's third studio album The Lady Killer (2010), and "The Other Side" for Mars's debut EP It's Better If You Don't Understand (2010).

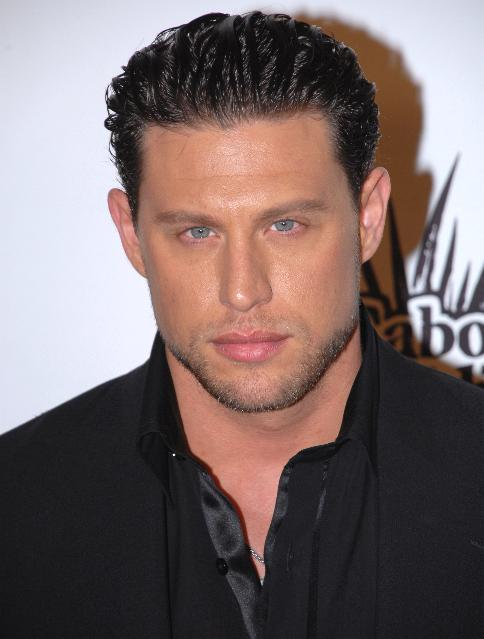
J.R. Rotem co-wrote six songs with Mars, including three tracks for Sean Kingston's second studio album Tomorrow (2009).

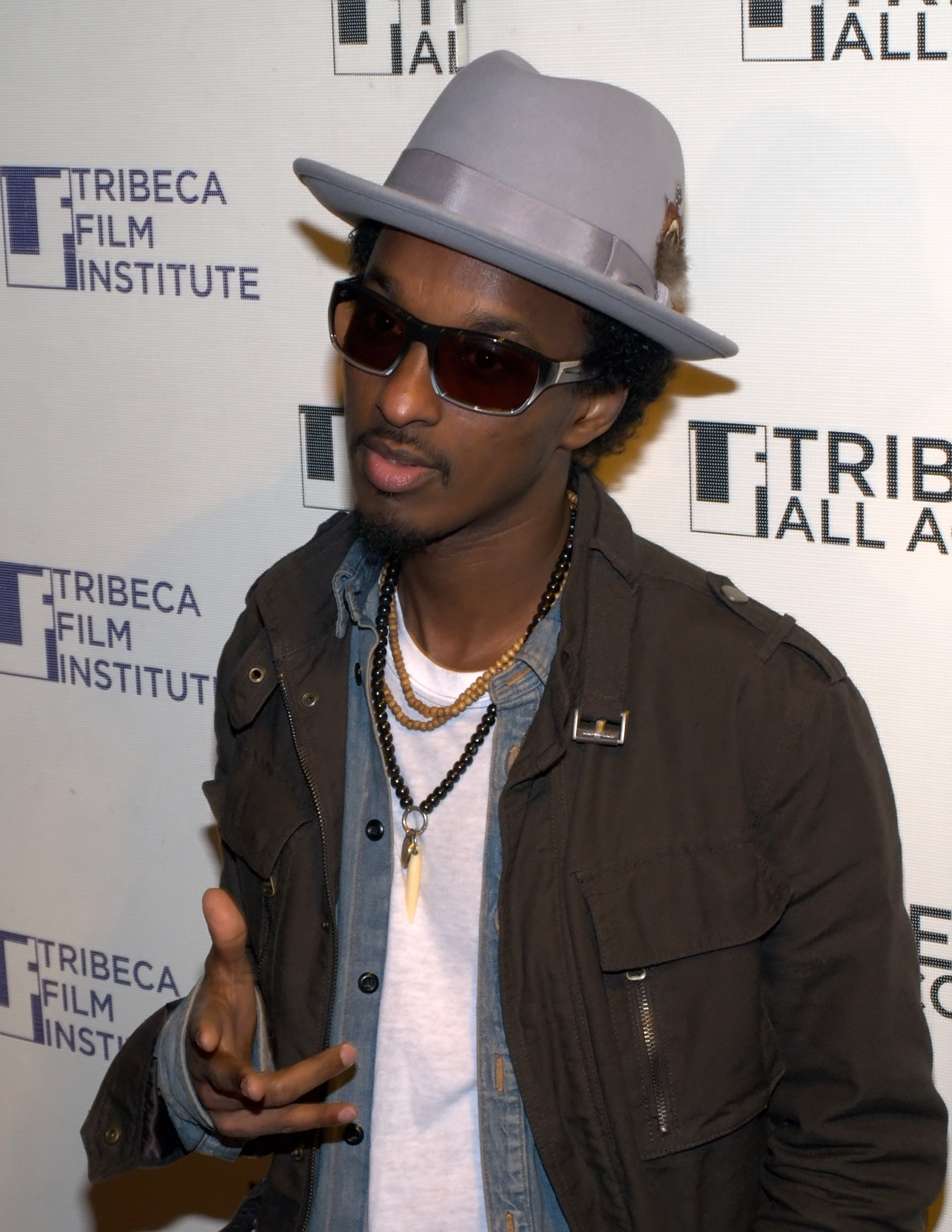
Mars co-wrote various songs with K'naan, including "Bang Bang", "The Lazy Song" and "Wavin' Flag".

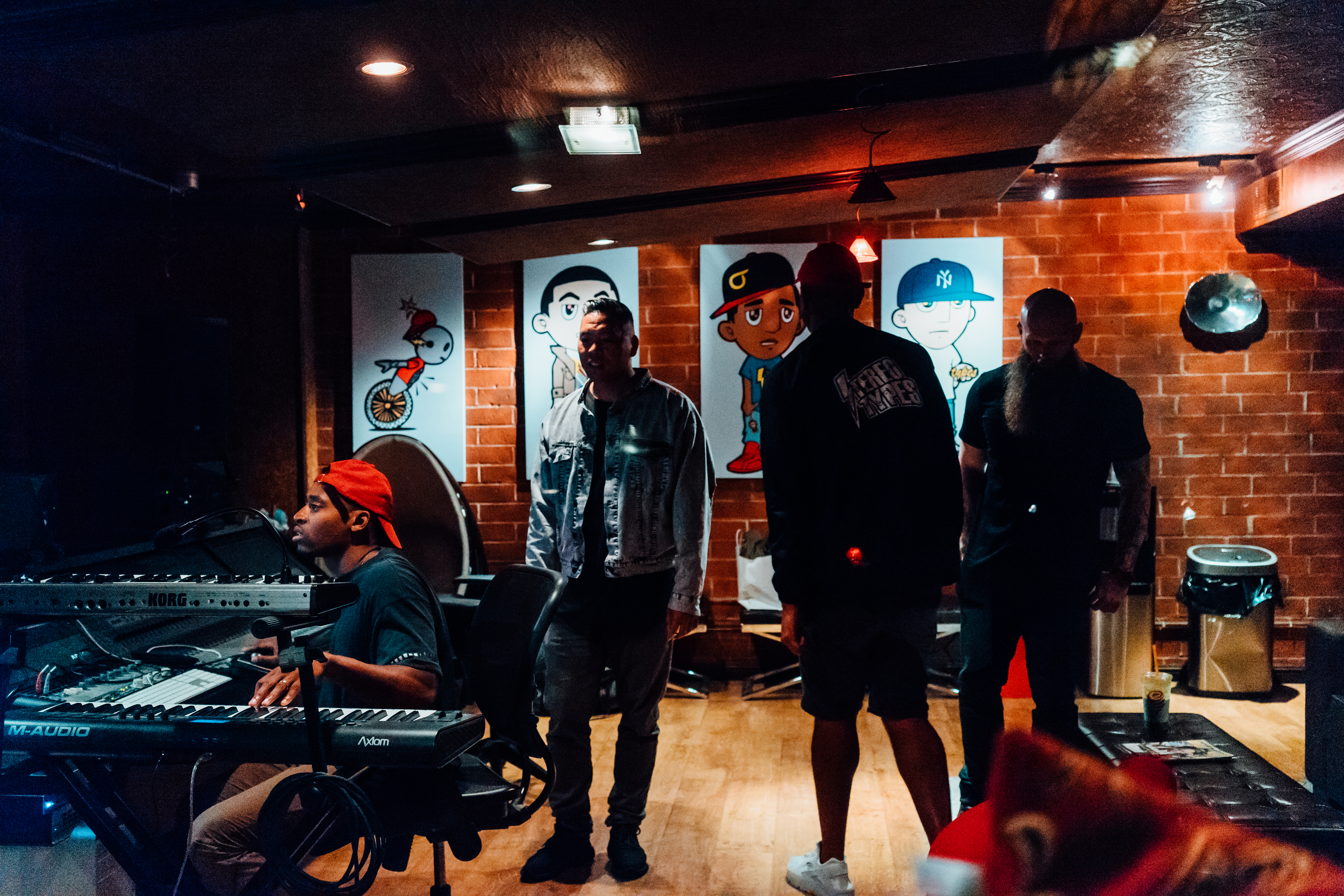
Mars and The Stereotypes co-wrote various songs together, including Travie McCoy's "We'll Be Alright", Far East Movement's "If I Was You (OMG)" featuring Snoop Dogg and "Rocketeer" featuring Ryan Tedder. Together, they co-wrote "That's What I Like" and "Finesse" for Mars's third studio album 24K Magic (2016).

Key
#	Indicates songs released as singles
†	Indicates songs released as promotional singles

Name of song, featured performers, writer(s), original release, and year of release
Song	Artist(s)	Writer(s)	Album	Year	Ref.
"50/50"	—N/a	Bruno Mars; Claudia Brant; Rogét Chahayed; Lisenny Rodriguez; Willy Rodriguez; Wesley Singerman	—N/a	Unreleased	
"777"	Bruno Mars, Anderson .Paak as Silk Sonic	Bruno Mars; Brandon Anderson; Dernst Emile II; Christopher "Brody" Brown	An Evening with Silk Sonic	2021	
"6 A.M." † (Note: Bruno Mars was not credited as a featured artist on the first release of "6AM". In 2012, he was credited on Bueno's mixtape Maloof Money, Vol. 3 (Executive Decisions).)	Bueno	Bueno; Bruno Mars; Jonathan Yip; Ray Romulus; Jeremy Reeves	Can't Knock the Hustle	2009	
"24K Magic" †	Bruno Mars	Bruno Mars; Philip Lawrence; Christopher Brody Brown	24K Magic	2016	
"3D"	Far East Movement (featuring Bruno Mars)	Jae Choung; Kevin Nishimura; James Roh; Peter Hernandez; Jonathan Yip; Ray Romulus; Jeremy Reeves	Animal	2009	
"911 State of Emergency"	—N/a	Bruno Mars; Philip Lawrence; Jonathan Rotem	—N/a	Unreleased	
"After Last Night"	Bruno Mars, Anderson .Paak as Silk Sonic (with Thundercat and Bootsy Collins)	Bruno Mars; Brandon Anderson; Dernst Emile II; James Fauntleroy; Stephen Bruner; Johnathan Yip; Ray Romulus; Jeremy Reeves; Ray McCullough II	An Evening with Silk Sonic	2021	
"Again"	Natasha Bedingfield	Bruno Mars; Philip Lawrence; Jonathan Yip; Ray Romulus; Jeremy Reeves; Rodney Jerkins	Confessions of a Shopaholic	2009	
"All About You"	—N/a	Bruno Mars; Philip Lawrence	—N/a	Unreleased	
"All Alone"	—N/a	Bruno Mars; Anthony Lee	—N/a	Unreleased	
"All I Ask"	Adele	Adele Adkins; Bruno Mars; Philip Lawrence; Christopher "Brody" Brown	25	2015	
"All She Knows" (Note: Alternate title "Love")	—N/a	Bruno Mars; Philip Lawrence; Kasia Livingston; Justin Armstrong; Bennet Armstrong	—N/a	Unreleased	
"Amy"	Goodie Mob (featuring V)	Robert Barnett; Cameron Gipp; Thomas Callaway; Willie Knighton; Bruno Mars	Age Against the Machine	2013	
"Anywhere"	Anderson .Paak (featuring Snoop Dogg & The Last Artful, Dodgr)	Peter Hernandez; Brandon Anderson; Calvin Broadus Jr. Alana Chenevert; Jason Pounds; Reagan James	Oxnard	2018	
"APT."	Rosé, Bruno Mars	Chae Young Park; Bruno Mars; Amy Allen; Christopher "Brody" Brown; Henry Walter; Michael Chapman; Nicholas Chinn; Omer Fedi; Phillip Lawrence; Rogét Chahayed; Theron Thomas	Rosie	2024	
"Back Seat" (Note: Alternate title "Backseat")	—N/a	Bruno Mars; Francesca Richard; Kevin Irving; Bernard Edwards Jr.	—N/a	Unreleased	
"Bang Bang (She Shot Me)" †	K'naan (featuring Adam Levine)	Philip Lawrence; Bruno Mars; Keinan Abdi Warsame	Troubadour	2009	
"Before It Explodes" †	Charice	Bruno Mars; Philip Lawrence; Ari Levine	Infinity	2011	
"Best Friend"	—N/a	Bruno Mars; Philip Lawrence; Mario Winans	—N/a	Unreleased	
"Better"	Vanness Wu	Bruno Mars; Justin Michael	V	2011	
"Billionaire" †	Travie McCoy (featuring Bruno Mars)	Bruno Mars; Philip Lawrence; Ari Levine; Travie McCoy	Lazarus	2010	
"Biscuit"	K'naan	Bruno Mars; Philip Lawrence; Keinan Abdi Warsame	Troubadour	2009	
"Blast Off"	Bruno Mars, Anderson .Paak as Silk Sonic	Bruno Mars; Brandon Anderson; Dernst Emile II	An Evening with Silk Sonic	2021	
"Blow" †	Ed Sheeran, Chris Stapleton, Bruno Mars	Ed Sheeran; Chris Stapleton; Bruno Mars; Christopher "Brody" Brown; Frank Rogers; J.T. Cure; Bard McNamee; Gregory McKee	No.6 Collaborations Project	2019	
"Blow the Lights Out"	—N/a	Bruno Mars; Philip Lawrance; Unknown Writer	—N/a	Unreleased	
"Bow Chicka Wow Wow" †	Mike Posner	Mike Posner; Bruno Mars; Philip Lawrence; Ari Levine; Christopher "Brody" Brown	31 Minutes to Takeoff	2010	
"Bonde do Brunão" †	Bruno Mars	Bruno Mars; Jonathan Yip; Ray Romulus; Jeremy Reeves	Non-album single	2025	
"Bruno San's Theme Song"	Bruno Mars	Bruno Mars; Jeffrey Baranowski; Luke Jay Milano; Jeremy Reeves; Ray Romolus; Jonathan Yip	Non-album single	2024	
"Bubble Butt" †	Major Lazer (featuring Bruno Mars, Tyga & Mystic)	Thomas Pentz; Dave Taylor; Bruno Mars; Mandolyn Wind Ludlum; Michael Stevenson	Free the Universe	2013	
"Calling All My Lovelies"	Bruno Mars	Bruno Mars; Philip Lawrence; Christopher "Brody" Brown; James Fauntleroy; Emile Haynie; Jeff Bhasker	24K Magic	2016	
"Can We Dance" †	The Vamps	Bruno Mars; Philip Lawrence; Timz Lam; Espen Lind; Amund Bjørklund; Karl Michael	Meet the Vamps	2013	
"Cha Cha Cha"	Bruno Mars	Bruno Mars; Dernst Emile II; Philip Lawrence; Brody Brown; James Fauntleroy; Terius Gray	The Romantic	2026	
"Chunky" †	Bruno Mars	Bruno Mars; Philip Lawrence; Christopher "Brody" Brown; James Fauntleroy	24K Magic	2016	
"Come to Brazil"	Bruno Mars	Bruno Mars; Jeremy Reeves; Ray Romolus; Jonathan Yip	Non-album single	2024	
"Count on Me" †	Bruno Mars	Bruno Mars; Philip Lawrence; Ari Levine	Doo-Wops & Hooligans	2010	
"Cricket Communications"	—N/a	Bruno Mars; Philip Lawrance; Ari Levine; Matthew Miller	—N/a	Unreleased	
"Damn"	—N/a	Bruno Mars; Myke Lynn; Kevin Irving	—N/a	Unreleased	
"Dance in the Mirror" (Note: Alternate title "Dancing in the Mirror")	—N/a	Bruno Mars; Philip Lawrence; Ari Levine; Carlos Battey; Steven Battey	—N/a	Unreleased	
"Dance with Me"	Bruno Mars	Bruno Mars; Dernst Emile II; James Fauntleroy	The Romantic	2026	
"De Lo Mio"	—N/a	Bruno Mars; Claudia Brant; Rogét Chahayed; Lisenny Rodriguez; Willy Rodriguez; Wesley Singerman	—N/a	Unreleased	
"Die With a Smile"	Bruno Mars; Lady Gaga	Bruno Mars; Stefani Germanotta; Dernst Emile II; Andrew Watt; James Fauntleroy	Mayhem	2024	
"Digital"	—N/a	Bruno Mars; Philip Lawrence; Mike Caren; Unknown Writer	—N/a	Unreleased	
"Digital Girl"	—N/a	Bruno Mars; Philip Lawrence; Jeeve	—N/a	Unreleased	
"DJ Made Me Do It"	Shontelle (featuring Asher Roth)	Bruno Mars; Philip Lawrence; Ari Levine; Carlos Battey; Steven Battey	No Gravity	2010	
"Don't Stop"	—N/a	Bruno Mars; Philip Lawrence; Ari Levine	—N/a	Unreleased	
"Dr. Feel Good"	Travie McCoy (featuring CeeLo Green)	Thomas Callaway; Bruno Mars; Philip Lawrence; Ari Levine; Travie McCoy	Lazarus	2010	
"Dreamtaker" (Note: Alternate title "Dream Taker")	—N/a	Bruno Mars; Philip Lawrence; Fernando Garibay	—N/a	Unreleased	
"Dumb Love" †	Sean Kingston	Bruno Mars; Philip Lawrence; Ari Levine; Carlos Battey; Steven Battey; Clarence E. Quick	—N/a	2010	
"Endlessly" †	The Cab	Alex DeLeon; Philip Lawrence; Bruno Mars; Mike Daly; Alex Marshall	Symphony Soldier	2011	
"Enjoy Yourself"	The O'Jays	Bruno Mars; Philip Lawrence; Patrick Monahan	The Last Word	2019	
"Faded"	—N/a	Bruno Mars; Philip Lawrence; Ari Levine; Taryll Adren Jackson	—N/a	Unreleased	
"Fall"	—N/a	Bruno Mars; Philip Lawrence; Pull	—N/a	Unreleased	
"Fat, Juicy and Wet"	Sexyy Red; Bruno Mars	Janae Wherry; Bruno Mars; Johnathan Yip; Ray Romulus; Jeremy Reeves; Kameron Glasper	Non-album single	2025	
"Feel Right" †	Mark Ronson (featuring Mystikal)	Mark Ronson; Michael Tyler; Homer Steinweiss; Thomas Brenneck; Bruno Mars; Philip Lawrence; Nick Movshon; Christopher "Brody" Brown	Uptown Special	2014	
"Finesse" †	Bruno Mars	Bruno Mars; Philip Lawrence; Christopher "Brody" Brown; James Fauntleroy; Jonathan Yip; Ray Romulus; Jeremy Reeves; Ray McCullough II	24K Magic	2016	
"Fire"	—N/a	Bruno Mars; Philip Lawrence; Carsten Schack; Kenneth Karlin	—N/a	Unreleased	
"Fire In The Sky"	Anderson .Paak	Alissia Benveniste; Anderson .Paak; Bruno Mars; Rogét Chahayed; Son Tzu; Taylor Dexter; Wesley Singerman	Shang-Chi and the Legend of the Ten Rings	2021	
"Fly as Me"	Bruno Mars, Anderson .Paak as Silk Sonic	Bruno Mars; Brandon Anderson; Dernst Emile II; James Fauntleroy; Sean Anderson	An Evening with Silk Sonic	2021	
"Foke"	—N/a	Bruno Mars; Claudia Brant; Rogét Chahayed; Lisenny Rodriguez; Willy Rodriguez; Wesley Singerman	—N/a	Unreleased	
"Forever Valentine" †	Charlie Wilson	Charlie Wilson; Bruno Mars; Dernst Emile II; Jonathan Yip; Ray Romulus; Jeremy Reeves; Micah Powell; Seth Reger	—N/a	2020	
"Freedom"	—N/a	Bruno Mars; Philip Lawrence; Carlos Battey; Steven Battey; Fernando Garibay; Wynter Gordon	—N/a	Unreleased	
"Fuck You" † (Note: Additional songwriting by CeeLo Green on the clean version "Forget You".)	CeeLo Green	Bruno Mars; Philip Lawrence; Ari Levine; Christopher "Brody" Brown	The Lady Killer	2010	
"Get a Room"	—N/a	Bruno Mars; Philip Lawrence; Ari Levine	—N/a	Unreleased	
"Get Sexy" †	Sugababes	Bruno Mars; Philip Lawrence; Ari Levine; Richard Fairbrass; Fred Fairbrass; Rob Manzoli	Sweet 7	2010	
"Girl in the Window" (Note: Alternate title "Window")	—N/a	Bruno Mars; Philip Lawrence; Christopher "Brody" Brown	—N/a	Unreleased	
"Girls on the Dance Floor" †	Far East Movement	Jae Choung; Kevin Nishimura; Jame Roh; Bruno Mars; Jonathan Yip; Ray Romulus; Jeremy Reeves	Animal	2009	
"Go Ape"	Far East Movement (featuring Lil Jon & Colette Carr)	Jae Choung; Kevin Nishimura; James Roh; Virman Coquia; Peter Gene Hernandez; Philip Lawrence; Malcom M. McDaniel; Jonathan Yip; Ray Romulus; Jeremy Reeves; Gwen Stefani; Pharrell Williams	Free Wired	2010	
"God Was Showing Off"	Bruno Mars	Bruno Mars; Dernst Emile II; Philip Lawrence; James Fauntleroy; Homer Steinweiss; Leon Michels; Dave Guy	The Romantic	2026	
"Gold" † (Note: This song was re-record as "Shine Like Gold" by Big Gipp and CeeLo Green in 2014.)	Neon Hitch	Neon Hitch; Bruno Mars; Philip Lawrence; Benjamin Levin; Claude Kelly	—N/a	2012	
"Good Luck"	—N/a	Bruno Mars; Philip Lawrence; Ari Levine; Carlos Battey; Steven Battey	—N/a	Unreleased	
"Gorilla" †	Bruno Mars	Bruno Mars; Philip Lawrence; Ari Levine	Unorthodox Jukebox	2012	
"Gotchu on the Run" (Note: Alternate title "Getchu on the Run")	—N/a	Bruno Mars; Philip Lawrence; Carsten Schack; Kenneth Karlin	—N/a	Unreleased	
"Grenade" †	Bruno Mars	Bruno Mars; Philip Lawrence; Ari Levine; Christopher "Brody" Brown; Claude Kelly; Andrew Wyatt	Doo-Wops & Hooligans	2010	
"Grown Man"	—N/a	Bruno Mars; Jaun Da Jordan	—N/a	Unreleased	
"Heaven"	—N/a	Bruno Mars; Philip Lawrence; Ari Levine; Kiyoshi Matsuo	—N/a	Unreleased	
"Her World Goes On" †	Justin Michael (featuring Kemal)	Bruno Mars; Justin Michael; Kemal Golden	—N/a	2013	
"Hot Mess" †	Cobra Starship	Gabriel Saporta; Kara Dioguardi; Philip Lawrance; Bruno Mars; Mike Caren; Oliver Goldstein; Jacob Kasher; Kevin Rudolf; Roonie Wood	Hot Mess	2009	
"I Can Make U Love Me"	—N/a	Bruno Mars; Philip Lawrence; Ari Levine; Tina Parol	—N/a	Unreleased	
"I Just Might" †	Bruno Mars	Bruno Mars; Dernst Emile II; Philip Lawrence; Brody Brown	The Romantic	2026	
"If I Knew"	Bruno Mars	Bruno Mars; Philip Lawrence; Ari Levine	Unorthodox Jukebox	2012	
"If I Was You (OMG)" †	Far East Movement (featuring Snoop Dogg)	Calvin Broadus Jr. Jae Choung; Kevin Nishimura; James Roh; Virman Coquia; Bruno Mars; Philip Lawrence; Jonathan Yip; Ray Romulus; Jeremy Reeves	Free Wired	2010	
"Innocent"	—N/a	Bruno Mars; Philip Lawrence; David Quinones; Evan "Kidd" Bogart	—N/a	Unreleased	
"Island Queen"	Sean Kingston	Bruno Mars; Philip Lawrence	Tomorrow	2009	
"It Will Rain" †	Bruno Mars	Bruno Mars; Philip Lawrence; Ari Levine	The Twilight Saga: Breaking Dawn – Part 1	2011	
"Jamie Doesn't Know" (Note: Alternate title "Hey You")	—N/a	Peter Gene Hernandez; Anthony Lee	—N/a	Unreleased	
"Johnny"	Melanie Fiona	Melanie Fiona; Philip Lawrence; Bruno Mars; Jonathan Yip; Ray Romulus; Jeremy Reeves	The Bridge	2009	
"Just a Kiss" † (Note: This song was sampled in "Just (The Tip)" by Plies featuring Jeremih and Ludacris.)	Mishon	Bruno Mars; Philip Lawrence; Marcos Palacio; Ernest Clark	—N/a	2009	
"Just the Way You Are" †	Bruno Mars	Bruno Mars; Philip Lawrence; Ari Levine; Khalil Walton; Khari Cain	Doo-Wops & Hooligans	2010	
"Killa on the Run"	—N/a	Bruno Mars; Philip Lawrence; Ari Levine	—N/a	Unreleased	
"Killin' Dem" (Note: Alternate title "Killin Dem")	—N/a	Bruno Mars; Philip Lawrence; Ari Levine	—N/a	Unreleased	
"Knockin" †	Vanness Wu	Justin Michael; Bruno Mars	C'est La V	2011	
"Ladies is Pimps Too" (Note: Alternate title "Ladies is Pimp Too")	—N/a	Bruno Mars; Philip Lawrence; Ari Levine	—N/a	Unreleased	
"Last Song in the Club" (Note: The song was removed from various digital platforms after its initially release with no reason given.)	Dimaiores (featuring Bruno Mars)	Bruno Mars; Antonhy Lee; Kara Dioguardi; Kasia Livingston; Christopher "Brody" Brown	—N/a	2015	
"Leave the Door Open" †	Bruno Mars, Anderson .Paak as Silk Sonic	Bruno Mars; Brandon Anderson; Christopher "Brody" Brown; Dernst Emile II	An Evening with Silk Sonic	2021	
"Let It Go"	—N/a	Philip Lawrence; Bruno Mars; Pull	—N/a	Unreleased	
"Letting Go"	Justin Michael	Bruno Mars; Justin Michael	—N/a	2013	
"Lift Off" †	Jay-Z, Kanye West	Kanye West; Shawn Carter; Jeff Bhasker; Mike Dean; Pharrell Williams; Bruno Mars; Seal Samuel	Watch the Throne	2011	
"Lighters" †	Bad Meets Evil	Marshall Mathers; Ryan Montgomery; Bruno Mars; Philip Lawrence; Ari Levine; Roy Battle	Hell: The Sequel	2011	
"Liquor Store Blues" #	Bruno Mars (featuring Damian Marley)	Bruno Mars; Philip Lawrence; Ari Levine; Dwayne Chin-Quee; Mitchum Chin; Damian Marley; Thomas Pentz	Doo-Wops & Hooligans	2010	
"Living in the Sky with Diamonds" †	Cobra Starship	Gabriel Saporta; Mike Caren; Oliver Goldstein; Bruno Mars; Philip Lawrence; Daryl Hall; John Oates; Sara Allen	Hot Mess	2009	
"Locked Out of Heaven" †	Bruno Mars	Bruno Mars; Philip Lawrence; Ari Levine	Unorthodox Jukebox	2012	
"Long Distance" †	Brandy	Rodney Jerkins; Bruno Mars; Philip Lawrence; Jeff Bhasker	Human	2008	
"Look but Don't Touch"	—N/a	Jeff Bhasker; Peter Gene Hernandez	—N/a	Unreleased	
"Lost" †	Menudo	Bruno Mars; Philip Lawrence; Cory Rooney	—N/a	2008	
"Love"	Jaeson (featuring Bruno Mars)	Jaeson Ma; Peter Hernandez	Glory	2010	
"Mama's Worst Nightmare"	—N/a	Bruno Mars; Philip Lawrence; Ari Levine	—N/a	Unreleased	
"Marry You" †	Bruno Mars	Bruno Mars; Philip Lawrence; Ari Levine	Doo-Wops & Hooligans	2010	
"Mind"	—N/a	Bruno Mars; Benji Hughes; Keith Ciancia	—N/a	Unreleased	
"Mirror" †	Lil Wayne (featuring Bruno Mars)	Dwayne Carter Jr. Bruno Mars; Philip Lawrence; Ramon Owen	Tha Carter IV	2011	
"Miss Everything"	Sugababes (featuring Sean Kingston)	Bruno Mars; Philip Lawrence; Ari Levine; Christopher "Brody" Brown	Sweet 7	2010	
"Money Make Her Smile"	Bruno Mars	Bruno Mars; Philip Lawrence; Ari Levine; Christopher "Brody" Brown	Unorthodox Jukebox	2012	
"Moonshine" #	Bruno Mars	Bruno Mars; Philip Lawrence; Ari Levine; Andrew Wyatt; Jeff Bhasker; Mark Ronson	Unorthodox Jukebox	2012	
"Mr. Johnny" (Note: Alternate title "Mister Johnny")	—N/a	Bruno Mars; Philip Lawrence; Livvi Franc; Jonathan Yip; Ray Romulus	—N/a	Unreleased	
"My Girlfriend"	Sean Kingston	Fernando Garibay; Bruno Mars; Philip Lawrence	Tomorrow	2009	
"My Love" (Note: Alternate titles "You Are (My Love)" and "You Are My Love")	—N/a	Bruno Mars; Jeff Bhasker; Phredley Brown; Mark Ronson	—N/a	Unreleased	
"Natalie"	Bruno Mars	Bruno Mars; Philip Lawrence; Ari Levine; Benjamin Levin; Paul Epworth	Unorthodox Jukebox	2012	
"Never Close Our Eyes" †	Adam Lambert	Bruno Mars; Philip Lawrence; Ari Levine; Lukasz Gottwald; Henry Walter	Trespassing	2012	
"Never Say U Can't" (Note: Alternate title "Never Say You Can't")	—N/a	Bruno Mars; Philip Lawrence; Ari Levine	—N/a	Unreleased	
"Nobody" (Note: The song was removed from various digital platforms after its initially release with no reason given. It was also removed from the album More Life.)	dB FRE$H (featuring Bruno Mars)	Jarrel DeAndre' Curne; Peter Gene Hernandez	More Life	2017	
"Nothin' on You" †	B.o.B (featuring Bruno Mars)	Bruno Mars; Philip Lawrence; Ari Levine; Bobby Ray Simmons	B.o.B Presents: The Adventures of Bobby Ray	2009	
"Nothing Left"	Bruno Mars	Bruno Mars; Dernst Emile II	The Romantic	2026	
"Number One Girl" †	Rosé	Chae Young Park; Amy Allen; Bruno Mars; Dernst Emile II; Carter Lang; Dylan Wiggins; Omer Fedi	Rosie	2024	
"Old & Crazy"	Bruno Mars (featuring Esperanza Spalding)	Bruno Mars; Jeff Bhasker	Unorthodox Jukebox	2012	
"On My Soul"	Bruno Mars	Bruno Mars; Dernst Emile II; Philip Lawrence; James Fauntleroy	The Romantic	2026	
"One At a Time" †	Travie McCoy	Bruno Mars; Philip Lawrence; Ari Levine; Travie McCoy	—N/a	2009	
"One Day" † (Note: Alternate title "Cricket Communications" (12/20/10-12/31/11))	Matisyahu	Bruno Mars; Philip Lawrence; Ari Levine; Matthew Miller	Light	2009	
"One Way or Another"	—N/a	Bruno Mars; Unknown Writer	—N/a	Unreleased	
"Only When You're Lonely"	—N/a	Bruno Mars; Philip Lawrence; Sean Marshall; Gary Spriggs	—N/a	Unreleased	
"Our Little Secret"	—N/a	Bruno Mars; Todd Mushaw; Kevin Irving	—N/a	Unreleased	
"Our First Time"	Bruno Mars	Bruno Mars; Philip Lawrence; Ari Levine; Dwayne Chin-quee; Mitchum Chin	Doo-Wops & Hooligans	2010	
"Party Goes Harder"	—N/a	Dave Gibson; Bruno Mars; Philip Lawrence; Ari Levine	—N/a	Unreleased	
"Perfect" (Note: Demo titled as "Who Is")	Alexandra Burke	Bruno Mars; Philip Lawrence; Ari Levine; James Fauntleroy	Overcome	2010	
"Perm"	Bruno Mars	Bruno Mars; Philip Lawrence; Christopher "Brody" Brown; James Fauntleroy; Homer Steinweiss; Trevor Lawrence Jr.	24K Magic	2016	
"Please Me"	Cardi B, Bruno Mars	Belcalis Almanzar; Bruno Mars; James Fauntleroy; Jonathan Yip; Ray Romulus; Jeremy Reeves	—N/a	2019	
"Press It On Me"	—N/a	Bruno Mars; Anthony Lee	—N/a	Unreleased	
"Press Your Number" † (Note: Demo titled as "Press It")	Taemin	Lee Taemin; Tenzo & Tasc; Bruno Mars; Philip Lawrence; Jonathan Yip; Ray Romulus; Jeremy Reeves	Press It	2016	
"Put On a Smile"	Bruno Mars, Anderson .Paak as Silk Sonic	Bruno Mars; Brandon Anderson; Dernst Emile II	An Evening with Silk Sonic	2021	
"Ride Tonight"	—N/a	Bruno Mars; Deana Evans; Kevin Irving; Bernard Edwards Jr.	—N/a	Unreleased	
"Right Round" †	Flo Rida	Tramar Dillard; Lukasz Gottwald; Allan Grigg; Justin Franks; Philip Lawrence; Bruno Mars; Aaron Bay-Schuck; Dead or Alive	R.O.O.T.S.	2009	
"Risk It All" †	Bruno Mars	Bruno Mars; Dernst Emile II; Philip Lawrence; James Fauntleroy	The Romantic	2026	
"Rocketeer" †	Far East Movement	Jae Choung; Kevin Nishimura; James Roh; Virman Coquia; Bruno Mars; Philip Lawrence; Jonathan Yip; Ray Romulus; Jeremy Reeves	Free Wired	2010	
"Rock Bitch"	—N/a	Bruno Mars; Philip Lawrence; Yeshe Perl; Lukasz Gottwald	—N/a	Unreleased	
"Run Away"	—N/a	Peter Gene Hernandez; Anthony Lee	—N/a	Unreleased	
"Runaway"	—N/a	Bruno Mars; Philip Lawrence; Jonathan Rotem	—N/a	Unreleased	
"Runaway Baby"	Bruno Mars	Bruno Mars; Philip Lawrence; Ari Levine; Christopher "Brody" Brown	Doo-Wops & Hooligans	2010	
Runway †	Lady Gaga; Doechii	Bruno Mars; Andrew Watt; D'Mile; Jayda Love; Doechii; Lady Gaga; Cirkut	The Devil Wears Prada 2	2026	
"Secret"	—N/a	Bruno Mars; Philip Lawrence; Sean Kingston; Jonathan Rotem	—N/a	Unreleased	
"Separated"	—N/a	Bruno Mars; Philip Lawrence; Unknown Writer	—N/a	Unreleased	
"She's a Mess" (Note: Alternate title "I'm a Mess")	Sugababes	Bruno Mars; Philip Lawrence; Ari Levine	Sweet 7	2010	
"Show Me"	Bruno Mars	Bruno Mars; Philip Lawrence; Ari Levine; Dwayne Chin-Quee; Mitchum Chin	Unorthodox Jukebox	2012	
"Si Tu Supieras"	—N/a	Bruno Mars; Claudia Brant; Rogét Chahayed; Lisenny Rodriguez; Wesley Singerman	—N/a	Unreleased	
"Silk Sonic Intro"	Bruno Mars, Anderson Paak as Silk Sonic	Bruno Mars; Brandon Anderson; Dernst Emile II	An Evening with Silk Sonic	2021	
"Simply Perfect"	—N/a	Bruno Mars	—N/a	Unreleased	
"Skate" †	Bruno Mars, Anderson Paak as Silk Sonic	Bruno Mars; Brandon Anderson; Dernst Emile II; James Fauntleroy; Domitille Degalle; JD Beck	An Evening with Silk Sonic	2021	
"Smokin out the Window" †	Bruno Mars, Anderson Paak as Silk Sonic	Bruno Mars; Brandon Anderson; Dernst Emile II	An Evening with Silk Sonic	2021	
"Something Serious"	Bruno Mars	Bruno Mars; Dernst Emile II	The Romantic	2026	
"Something Glorious"	—N/a	Bruno Mars; Philip Lawrence; Ari Levine; Matthew Miller	—N/a	Unreleased	
"Somewhere in Brooklyn"	Bruno Mars	Bruno Mars; Philip Lawrence; Ari Levine	Doo-Wops & Hooligans	2010	
"So Stupid"	—N/a	Bruno Mars; Philip Lawrence; Edwin Serrano; Unknown writer	—N/a	Unreleased	
"Starting Today"	Nina Sky	Bruno Mars; Philip Lawrence; Ari Levine; Nicole Albino; Natalie Albino	Nicole and Natalie	2012	
"Stayin' Alive"	—N/a	Bruno Mars; Philip Lawrence; Ari Levine; Travie McCoy	—N/a	Unreleased	
"Still"	Karol G, Bruno Mars	Carolina Giraldo; Peter Hernandez; Alexandra Yatchenko; Isabel LaRosa; Thomas LaRosa	No Me Arrepiento de Sentir Tanto	2026	
"Stoopid Cupid" (Note: Alternate title "Stupid Cupid")	—N/a	Bruno Mars; Philip Lawrence; Allan Grigg	—N/a	Unreleased	
"Straight Up & Down"	Bruno Mars	Bruno Mars; Philip Lawrence; Christopher "Brody" Brown; James Fauntleroy; Faheem Najm; Carl Martin; Marc Gay	24K Magic	2016	
"Switch" (Note: Demo titled as "Turn Me On")	Nick & Knight	Bruno Mars; Philip Lawrence; Keith Harris	Nick & Knight	2014	
"Switch" (Note: Unrelated to "Switch" by Nick & Knight)	—N/a	Bruno Mars; Philip Lawrence; Jeff Bhasker	—N/a	Unreleased	
"Take the Long Way Home"	98 Degrees	Bruno Mars; Philip Lawrence; Carsten Schack; Kenneth Karlin	2.0	2013	
"Talking to the Moon" †	Bruno Mars	Bruno Mars; Philip Lawrence; Ari Levine; Albert Winkler; Jeff Bhasker	Doo-Wops & Hooligans	2010	
"Talk Talk"	—N/a	Bruno Mars; Philip Lawrence; Ari Levine; Neon Hitch; Kara DioGuardi; Christopher "Brody" Brown	—N/a	Unreleased	
"Tears Always Win" †	Alicia Keys	Alicia Keys; Bruno Mars; Jeff Bhasker; Philip Lawrence	Girl on Fire	2012	
"Tears Don't Belong"	—N/a	Bruno Mars; Claudia Brant; Rogét Chahayed; Imad-Roy El-Amine; Philip Lawrence; Lisenny Rodrigurez	—N/a	Unreleased	
"That's What I Like" †	Bruno Mars	Bruno Mars; Philip Lawrence; Christopher "Brody" Brown; James Fauntleroy; Jonathan Yip; Ray Romulus; Jeremy Reeves	24K Magic	2016	
"That's Why I Love You"	Victoria Monét (featuring Bruno Mars)	Victoria Monét; Bruno Mars; Camper; Dernst Emile II; Solána Rowe	Frequency of Love	2026	
"That's You" †	Lucky Daye	David Brown; Austin Brown; Bruno Mars; Dernst Emile II; Mike "Hunnid" McGregor	Algorithm	2023	
"The Dedication (Ay DJ)" †	Jibbs (featuring Lloyd)	Jovan Campbell; Bruno Mars; Philip Lawrence; Ari Levine	—N/a	2009	
"The Lazy Song" †	Bruno Mars	Bruno Mars; Philip Lawrence; Ari Levine; K'naan	Doo-Wops & Hooligans	2010	
"The Other Side"	Bruno Mars (featuring CeeLo Green and B.o.B)	Bruno Mars; Philip Lawrence; Ari Levine; Christopher "Brody" Brown; Mike Caren; Patrick Stump; Kaveh Rastegar; John Wicks; Jeremy Ruzumna; Joshua Lopez; Bobby Simmons Jr.	Doo-Wops & Hooligans	2010	
"The Rest of My Life"	—N/a	Bruno Mars; Philip Lawrence; Ari Levine	—N/a	Unreleased	
"The Scenic Route"	Dr. Dre (featuring Anderson .Paak and Rick Ross)	Bruno Mars; Brandon Anderson; William Roberts II; Andre Young	Grand Theft Auto Online: The Contract	2021	
"There I Go Again"	—N/a	Bruno Mars; Philip Lawrence; Cory Rooney	—N/a	Unreleased	
"These Girls"	—N/a	Bruno Mars; Philip Lawrence; Ari Levine; Sean Patwell; Christopher Wallace	—N/a	Unreleased	
"Today My Life Begins"	—N/a	Bruno Mars; Philip Lawrence; Ari Levine	—N/a	Unreleased	
"Tomorrow"	Sean Kingston	Jonathan Rotem; Keinan Abdi Warsame; Bruno Mars; Philip Lawrence	Tomorrow	2009	
"Too Good to Say Goodbye"	Bruno Mars	Bruno Mars; Philip Lawrence; Christopher "Brody" Brown; Jeff Bhasker; Kenneth "Babyface" Edmonds	24k Magic	2016	
"Top of the World"	—N/a	Bruno Mars; Philip Lawrence; Jonathan Yip; Ray Romulus; Jeremy Reeves	—N/a	Unreleased	
"Traffic"	—N/a	Bruno Mars; Dave Gibson	—N/a	Unreleased	
"Treasure" †	Bruno Mars	Bruno Mars; Philip Lawrence; Ari Levine; Phredley Brown; Thibaut Berland; Christopher Khan	Unorthodox Jukebox	2012	
"Twist Ya Around"	Sean Kingston	Jonathan Rotem; Bruno Mars; Philip Lawrence; Alexander Grant	Tomorrow	2009	
"Up"	—N/a	Bruno Mars; Benji Hughes; Keith Ciancia	—N/a	Unreleased	
"Uptown Funk" †	Mark Ronson (featuring Bruno Mars)	Mark Ronson; Bruno Mars; Philip Lawrence; Jeff Bhasker; Nicholas Williams; Devon Gallaspy; Charlie Wilson; Robert Wilson; Ronnie Wilson; Rudolph Taylor; Lonnie Simmons	Uptown Special	2014	
"Versace on the Floor" †	Bruno Mars	Bruno Mars; Philip Lawrence; Christopher "Brody" Brown; James Fauntleroy	24K Magic	2016	
"Voices" † (Note: Demo titled as "Voices in My Head")	The Lylas	Bruno Mars; Philip Lawrence	—N/a	2014	
"Wait for You"	Sugababes	Fernando Garibay; Bruno Mars; Philip Lawrence	Sweet 7	2010	
"Wake Up in the Sky" †	Gucci Mane, Bruno Mars, Kodak Black	Radric Davis; Peter Hernandez; Bill Kapri; Chance Youngblood; Dwan Avery; Jeff LaCroix	Evil Genius	2018	
"Walls Come Down" †	Keke Palmer	Carlos Battey; Steven Battey; Bruno Mars; Philip Lawrence; Fernando Garibay	Awaken Reloaded	2011	
"What It Feels Like"	—N/a	Bruno Mars; Philip Lawrence; Lemare Obika; Jonathan Rotem	—N/a	Unreleased	
"Watching Her Move" †	Blake Reary	Justin Michael; Bruno Mars; Blake Reary	—N/a	2013	
"We'll Be Alright" †	Travie McCoy	Bruno Mars; Philip Lawrence; Jonathan Yip; Ray Romulus; Jeremy Reeves; Mick Quinn; Rob Coombes; Danny Goffey	Lazarus	2010	
"Wear My Kiss" †	Sugababes	Fernando Garibay; Bruno Mars; Philip Lawrence; Carlos Battey; Steven Battey	Sweet 7	2010	
"Welcome Back"	Bruno Mars	Bruno Mars; Philip Lawrence; John Powell	Rio 2: Music from the Motion Picture	2014	
"Welcome to My World"	—N/a	Bruno Mars; Shaffer Smith; Kevin Erving; Freddy Armstrong	—N/a	Unreleased	
"Welcome to Tomorrow"	Sean Kingston	Bruno Mars; Philip Lawrence; K'naan; Jonathan Rotem	Tomorrow	2009	
"We Ok" †	The Very Best (featuring K'naan)	Johan Karberg; Esau Mwamwaya; Keinan Abdi Warsame; Bruno Mars; Philip Lawrence; Omino Adelekan	MTMTMK	2012	
"When I Was Your Man" †	Bruno Mars	Bruno Mars; Philip Lawrence; Ari Levine; Andrew Wyatt	Unorthodox Jukebox	2012	
"Why You Wanna Fight?"	Bruno Mars	Bruno Mars; Dernst Emile II; Brody Brown	The Romantic	2026	
"Whenever You Call" †	Arashi	Bruno Mars; Dernst Emile II	This Is Arashi	2020	
"Where Did She Go"	—N/a	Bruno Mars; Philip Lawrence; Jonathan Yip; Ray Romulus; Jeremy Reeves	—N/a	Unreleased	
"Who Dat Girl" †	Flo Rida (featuring Akon)	Tramar Dillard; Lukasz Gottwald; Claude Kelly; Benjamin Levin; Bruno Mars; Philip Lawrence	Only One Flo (Part 1)	2010	
"With Me"	—N/a	Bruno Mars; Kim Ah-Young; Anthony Lee	—N/a	Unreleased	
"You Old Man"	—N/a	Bruno Mars; Benji Hughes; Keith Ciancia	—N/a	Unreleased	
"Young Girls" †	Bruno Mars	Bruno Mars; Philip Lawrence; Ari Levine; Jeff Bhasker; Emile Haynie; Mac Davis	Unorthodox Jukebox	2012	
"Young, Wild & Free" †	Snoop Dogg, Wiz Khalifa (featuring Bruno Mars)	Calvin Broadus Jr. Cameron Thomaz; Peter Hernandez; Philip Lawrence; Ari Levine; Ted Bluechel; Marlon Barrow; Tyrone Griffin; Keenon Jackson; Nye Lee; Marquise Newman; Max Bennet; Larry Carlton; John Guerin; Joe Sample; Tom Scott	Mac & Devin Go to High School	2011	
