= Love So Sweet: Reborn =

2020 single by Arashi

Single by Arashi

from the album This Is Arashi
- Language: English; Japanese
- Released: May 15, 2020
- Length: 3:26
- Label: J Storm
- Songwriter(s): Ellen Shipley; SPIN; Youth Case
- Producer(s): Afterhrs

Arashi singles chronology
| "A-ra-shi: Reborn" (2019) | "Love So Sweet: Reborn" (2020) | "Kite" (2020) |

Music video
- "ARASHI - Love so sweet : Reborn [Official Lyric Video]" on YouTube

"Love So Sweet: Reborn" is a song by Japanese boy band Arashi, released as a single via J Storm on May 15, 2020, as announced on their official social media accounts. The song is the 4th in the "Reborn" series, after "A-ra-shi: Reborn" (also released as a single), "A Day in Our Life: Reborn", and "One Love: Reborn", which were included in the Arashi Reborn Vol.1 extended play, released on February 28, 2020.

== Background ==
The song was announced on the band's official social media. It is part of a new "Reborn" project by the band. The video for "Love so sweet: Reborn" was uploaded to the group's YouTube channel, and was included in download and streaming sites. On its first day, the song managed to reach over one million views in YouTube and topped the chart in Oricon and iTunes Daily Digital Download ranking. The song continued to rank among the top 10 spots for the first week, for both Oricon and iTunes charts.

As with the previous songs, "Love So Sweet: Reborn" has been made with a new arrangement and sound, as well as including more English in its lyrics.

== Music video ==
On May 15, 2020, the full-version music video was uploaded to Arashi's YouTube channel.

== Charts ==
| Chart (2020) | Peak position |
|---|---|
| Japan (Billboard Japan Hot Buzz Songs) | 1 |
| Japan (Oricon Total Weekly Singles) | 2 |
