= Come to Brazil (disambiguation) =

"Come to Brazil" is a phrase wherein Brazilians request entertainers to come visit them.

Come to Brazil may also refer to:

- "Come to Brazil", 2016 song by Alaska Thunderfuck from Poundcake
- "Come to Brazil", 2026 song by Bbno$
- "Come to Brazil", an unreleased song by Bruno Mars
- "Come to Brazil", 2024 song by the Offspring from Supercharged
- "Come to Brazil", 2019 song by Why Don't We
