= Math Lady =

Brazilian Internet meme

Image of the meme

Math Lady, Confused Lady or Confused Math Lady, known in Brazil as Nazaré Confusa (Portuguese for Confused Nazaré), is an Internet meme. It shows Brazilian actress Renata Sorrah surrounded by mathematical problems, in a scene from 2004 Brazilian soap opera Senhora do Destino, where she plays Nazaré Tedesco. The telenovela was widely popular in Brazil at the time, receiving high ratings even in reruns; Nazaré Tedesco, Sorrah's character in the show, is one of the most famous villains in the history of Brazilian telenovelas, and different memes involving her are popular in the country. "Math Lady" received international popularity.

== Background ==
Prior to the meme and even the soap opera where it comes from, Sorrah was already one of the most acclaimed and accomplished careers in Brazilian television, with her career starting in the late 1960s in Rede Tupi, moving soon to work for TV Globo, where she acted in many notable soap operas such as Vale Tudo and Pedra sobre Pedra; by 2004, she had received eleven awards across her career from many ceremonies, nine of which were for "Best actress".

=== In Senhora do Destino ===
Senhora do Destino (Portuguese for Lady of the Destiny) was a Brazilian soap opera broadcast by TV Globo from June 28, 2004, to March 11, 2005, in 221 chapters. In it, Sorrah portrayed the main antagonist Nazaré Tedesco, a prostitute who, in the first act of the soap opera (depicted in the past, with young Nazaré being portrayed by Adriana Esteves), kidnaps the recently born daughter of main protagonist Maria do Carmo (portrayed by Susana Vieira) in order to forge a marriage with José Carlos Tedesco (portrayed by Tarcísio Meira), at the time one of the richest men in Rio de Janeiro. The daughter was named Lindalva, but Nazaré renamed her Isabel to get away with the farce.

In the second act, set twenty-five years later, it is revealed that Nazaré and José Carlos have lost their fortune and had to mortgage their home in order to pay various late bills. After watching a news broadcast on Maria do Carmo, who had become a wealthy woman, talking about her missing daughter and showing a picture of young Nazaré; José Carlos finds out the truth about the daughter he and Nazaré raised and threatens to call the police on her, who in response, pushes him down a staircase, throws away his medication, leading to him suffering a cardiac arrest and dying. After the incident, Nazaré ends up without money, leading her to start living her life out of scams, including extorting Maria do Carmo in exchange for information about her lost daughter. Amidst this, Djenane (portrayed by Elizângela), a co-worker of Nazaré that helped her to fake the birth of Isabel, returns to blackmail Nazaré, and during a fight, Djenane falls down the stairs and dies. To avoid being accused of Djenane's death, Nazaré adulterates proofs against her and even pretends to be her in order to withdraw money from her account.

Nazaré's situation only kept getting more complicated as the story went, with her making another victim later in the drama by electrocuting another former accomplice Gilmar (portrayed by Roberto Bomtempo) in a bathtub. Nazaré also allies herself with Maria do Carmo's former husband (Isabel's own father), a reviled villain portrayed by José de Abreu, who ends up as a mentally unstable homeless man when Nazaré abandons him in her final escape. Eventually, Nazaré's end comes when she kidnaps Isabel's daughter and is the target of a chase, after she gets cornered in a bridge over a river, Nazaré redeems herself by giving Isabel's daughter back to her, but in turn, she jumps from the bridge, killing herself.

=== Reception and stardom ===
Senhora do Destino went on to become a smash hit with the Brazilian public, being one of the soap operas produced by Globo with the highest audience during the 2000s, and becoming one of the most iconic soap operas of all time in the country, with even some international acclaim, as Spanish newspaper 20 Minutos ranked Senhora do Destino as the 9th greatest Brazilian soap opera of all time; One of the leading factors for this was due to Sorrah's role as Nazaré Tedesco, who went on to become one of the most — if not, the — most iconic antagonists in Brazilian television, with her role largely overshadowing Vieira's role as the main character of the soap opera. The scenes that are often considered the most iconic ones of the soap opera all revolve around Nazaré, as these would include the various catchphrases and sarcastic comments made by the character, the murders of José Carlos and Gilmar, the death of Djenane, that is often wrongfully remembered as a murder in a Mandela effect situation, and Nazaré's suicide, particularly for her final line: "Eu vou voar. Olha, filha! Olha!" ('I'm gonna fly. Look, daughter! Look!')

== Pop culture notoriety and first memes in Brazil ==
For many years after the airing of Senhora do Destino, Nazaré still kept being remembered by the public, and went on to become Renata Sorrah's most iconic role, with several pop culture references, the most notable one happening in the 2011 soap opera Fina Estampa, where the main antagonist, Tereza Cristina (portrayed by Christiane Torloni), after killing another character by electrocuting him in a bathtub, proceeds to say "Obrigada, Nazaré Tedesco." ('Thank you, Nazaré Tedesco.').

Throughout the 2010s, many memes were birthed onto the Brazilian internet thanks to the character, some of the most notable ones include several Top Text Bottom Text templates; a still from her final scene, showing Nazaré running with Isabel's daughter on her lap, with a crowd running after her; as well as a scene where Nazaré spots two female characters talking about potentially marrying someday and thinks the line "Sapatonas... Eu sinto longe o cheiro de couro!" ('Dykes... I can smell the leather from a mile away!'), proceeded by her covering her nose. Several more of Nazaré's phrases have been used in gifs and reaction images in Brazilian internet.

== Math Lady and international notoriety ==
The original gif, without the math problems, started to circulate on Brazilian internet around 2013, stemming from a scene where Nazaré is in jail and reflects on a conversation she had with another character. Around the summer of 2016, the meme started to slowly spread once again, and after the addition of the mathematical problems, an inclusion in the website 9gag, and usage in Twitter memes during the American presidential debate between Donald Trump and Hillary Clinton, the meme rose into international popularity and went on to become even bigger in Brazil.

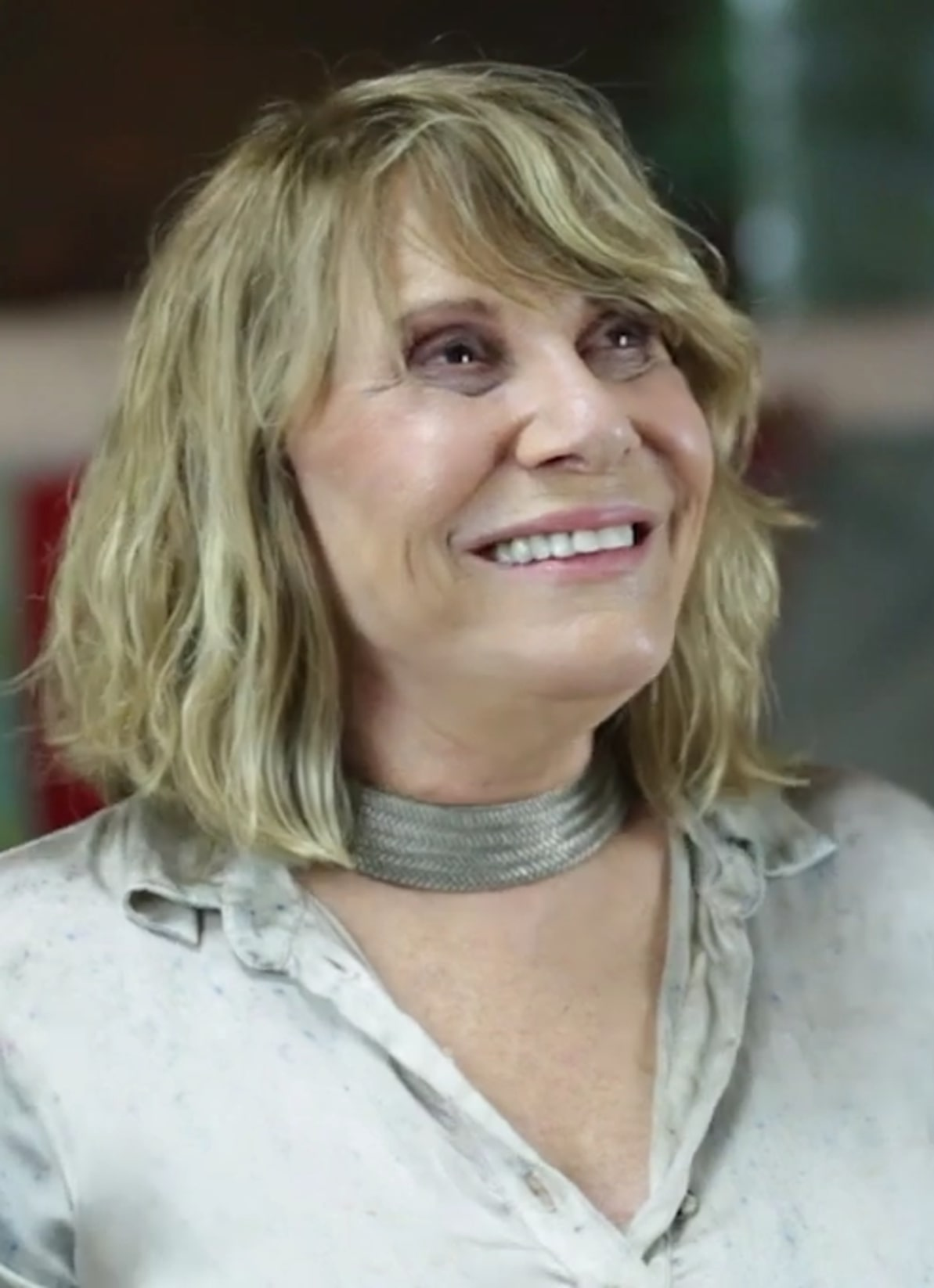
Renata Sorrah in 2019

=== Renata Sorrah's response ===
As the meme kept rising both in Brazilian and international internet, with some viewers even mistaking Sorrah for American actresses Julia Roberts and Sarah Paulson, everything came into Renata Sorrah's knowledge soon enough, she has responded multiple times about how the meme as a whole does not bother her and she embraces the joke, but sometimes, she does get mildly annoyed that the meme has overshadowed her acting career, as stated in an interview with Brazilian magazine Veja:

My nephew, who lives in New York, tells everybody that his aunt is the Math Lady, and everybody gets crazy.
But sometimes it's terrible. I remember once, in a festival in Curitiba, that I went through a bar full of young men and I heard: 'Look there, it's that meme lady'. We are working hard, doing theater, exhausted... to become 'the meme lady' (laughter). I don't have control of it, but it doesn't bother me.

— Renata Sorrah, about her own meme (Originally in Portuguese),

== Other related occurrences ==
In 2021, many Brazilian Twitter users compared the 2024 Summer Olympics logo with Nazaré Tedesco, some of them even editing sunglasses onto the logo to resemble a scene where Nazaré is disguised in a wedding.

On 10 May 2023, it was reported that Sorrah had come out as bisexual. The news became a trending topic on social media, with users resurfacing the meme and giving it a new meaning. In Brazil, her other meme where Nazaré judges two lesbian characters also resurfaced due to the news. Sorrah later denied the false reports on her sexuality.

== Reenactment of the meme in Show 60 Anos ==
On 28 April 2025, Globo broadcast a special concert celebrating the channel's 60th anniversary titled Show 60 Anos. During one of the segments celebrating the most iconic villainesses from the channel's soap operas, Sorrah portrayed Nazaré Tedesco for the first time since the ending of Senhora do Destino. In the scene, Sorrah enters a dressing room with many other female villains, such as Carminha from Avenida Brasil (Portrayed by Adriana Esteves), Cristina from Alma Gêmea (Portrayed by Flávia Alessandra), Perpétua from Tieta (Portrayed by Joana Fomm) and many others.

During a segment where they discuss why they should win the "best villainess in Globo's history" award, Nazaré mentions to Raquel from Mulheres de Areia (Portrayed by Glória Pires), her many memes in the Brazilian internet, and even being an "international phenomenon", referring to herself in the English term "Confused Math Lady"; A couple of moments after this, after Raquel's response, it's possible to see math equations floating around Nazaré. The scene generated rapturous discussion on X, many praising Sorrah for having the same spirit she had when she originally portrayed the character.

Said best villainess award never happened, as the skit ends with them being locked in the dressing room by Ivete Sangalo, as after that, Ivete performed a tribute to the villains by singing "Erva Venenosa", a cover of the Rita Lee song of the same name. Both are ultimately a Portuguese version of "Poison Ivy" by The Coasters.

== See also ==
- Pé de Chinesa, another Brazilian meme based around soap operas.
- Please, come to Brazil
