= 2gether (song) =

- UK cover

Single by Roger Sanchez and Far East Movement featuring Kanobby

from the album Free Wired
- Released: March 20, 2011 (UK)
- Recorded: 2010
- Genre: House
- Length: 2:31
- Label: Data
- Songwriter(s): Roger Sanchez; Jonathan Yip; Jeremy Reeves; Ray Romulus; James Roh; Kevin Nishimura; Virman Coquia; Dean Coleman; Jae Choung; Kate Pierson; Cindy Wilson; Fred Schneider; Keith Strickland
- Producer(s): Roger Sanchez

Far East Movement singles chronology
"Rocketeer" (2010)	"2gether" (2011)	"If I Was You (OMG)" (2011)

"2gether" is a song by Roger Sanchez and Far East Movement. The single features Kanobby. The track samples the song "Love Shack" by The B-52's. The original recording appears on the album Free Wired with a total run time of 3:05.

== Music video ==
The music video for the song premiered on Vevo and YouTube on December 20, 2010. Girls Aloud star Sarah Harding makes an appearance in the video.

== Track listing ==
Promo CD single

1. "2gether" (Radio Edit) – 2:33
2. "2gether" (Extended Mix) – 5:03

Digital download

1. "2gether" (Radio Edit) – 2:31

2gether (Remixes)

1. "2gether" (Radio Edit) – 2:35
2. "2gether" (Extended Mix) – 5:06
3. "2gether" (Pitron & Sanna Remix) – 7:26
4. "2gether" (Sidney Samson Remix) – 6:22
5. "2gether" (Antoine Clamaran Remix) – 8:03
6. "2gether" (Cyantific & Wilkinson Remix) – 4:31
7. "2gether" (Subscape Remix) – 5:14

== Credits and personnel ==
- Lead vocals – Far East Movement & Kanobby
- Producers – Roger Sanchez
- Lyrics – Roger Sanchez, James Roh, Kevin Nishimura, Virman Coquia, Jae Choung, Jonathan Yip, Jeremy Reeves, Ray Romulus
- Label: Ultra Records

== Charts ==
Chart (2011)	Peak position
Belgium (Ultratip Bubbling Under Flanders)	6
Netherlands (Single Top 100)	86
UK Singles (The Official Charts Company)	92

== Release history ==
Region	Date	Format	Label
United Kingdom	March 20, 2011	Digital download	Data Records
