= Rocketeer (song) =

2010 single by Far East Movement featuring Ryan Tedder

Single by Far East Movement featuring Ryan Tedder of OneRepublic

from the album Free Wired
- Released: October 9, 2010
- Recorded: 2010
- Studio: Short Bus (North Hollywood, California)
- Genre: Pop-rap
- Length: 3:31
- Label: Cherrytree; Interscope
- Songwriters: Jae Choung; James Roh; Kevin Nishimura; Virman Coquia; Jonathan Yip; Jeremy Reeves; Ray Romulus; Bruno Mars; Philip Lawrence
- Producers: The Stereotypes; The Smeezingtons

Far East Movement singles chronology
"Like a G6" (2010)	"Rocketeer" (2010)	"2gether" (2011)

Ryan Tedder singles chronology
"She Tried" (2010)	"Rocketeer" (2010)	"Calling (Lose My Mind)" (2012)

Music video
- "Rocketeer" on YouTube

"Rocketeer" is a song by American hip hop and electronic music group Far East Movement from their third studio album, Free Wired (2010). The song features vocals by American singer-songwriter Ryan Tedder of OneRepublic. It was released in the United States as the second single from the album on October 9, 2010, by Cherrytree and Interscope Records. According to the group, the song regards "flying to make those dreams happen for the one you love". They also cited the song was inspired by themselves as "LA Dreamers living on a dream and never knowing where it would take you".

The pop-rap song received generally positive reviews from music critics. Some of them called it one of the highlights of Free Wired, "catchy" and noticed the keyboard chords resembled those of "Somebody to Love" (2010) by Justin Bieber, which led to speculation that "Rocketeer" copied from the track. However, both songs were produced by the Stereotypes, with the latter being the first. In the US, the song peaked at number seven on the Billboard Hot 100 and Mainstream Top 40 charts, respectively. It also peaked at number six on the Rhythmic chart and number nine on Hot Rap Songs. The song entered at its peak of number 14 on the UK Singles Chart and reached number 11 in Slovakia. It peaked at number four in New Zealand, ten on the Japan Hot 100 and number 14 in Australia.

Director Marc Klasfeld shot the accompanying music video. It depicts a love story between a young couple, who will have to go their separate ways since the girl has to leave for a job in Japan. During the video, her boyfriend is seen gathering material for a makeshift jet pack to get to her after she leaves. At the end of the video, he goes "off into the night, leaving a trail of sparks behind him". A short film, titled "Rocketeer (LA Dreamer Short Film)", was also released in dedication to their hometown. Far East Movement performed the song live on various shows, such as Jimmy Kimmel Live!, Conan, and at the Billboard Music Awards.

== Background and development ==
A demo of "Rocketeer" was first recorded with vocals from Bruno Mars, which were replaced by Ryan Tedder's vocals on the final version, with the version ultimately being included on Far East Movement's album Free Wired in October 2010. The former version leaked on April 13, 2011. After the success of the lead single, "Like a G6", the group felt pressure to re-create it. However, instead of releasing "another dance song", there was a need to come up with something different to show their range as musicians. As a result, "Rocketeer" marked a departure from Far East Movement's usual sound.

Kev Nish, one of the members of the group, commented in an interview to Blues & Soul: "We'd basically go in the studio and take hip hop-style drums, electronic synths, alternative-style hooks and just mash it all UP! Which in turn became the inspiration behind a track like 'Rocketeer'... And, by featuring Ryan Tedder on the song, we were then also able to cover that credible, alternative rock base." Far East Movement detailed the process of the song's creation; they decided to change "the tempo and fuse a slower paced hip hop track with electro synths and an alternative style hook". According to them, the lyrics are "about flying to make those dreams happen for the one you love". Moreover, the group affirmed the track was "inspired by how we grew up in Downtown LA as LA Dreamers living on a dream and never knowing where it would take you. We wanted to paint a portrait of where we live, from where we started, to the free wired mashed up community of dreamers that make up LA."

== Production and release ==
"Rocketeer" was written by Jae Choung, James Roh, Kevin Nishimura, and Virman Coquia, whom are collectively known as Far East Movement, with additional songwriting by Jeremy Reeves, Johnathan Yip, and Ray Romulus, whom are collectively known as the Stereotypes, as well as by Mars and Philip Lawrence, also known as the Smeezingtons. The song was produced by the Stereotypes and the Smeezingtons, while it was recorded by the former team at Short Bus Studios in North Hollywood. Jaycen Joshua mixed "Rocketeer", with Giancarlo Lino and Jesus Garnica as mixing assistants. It was mastered by Brian "Big Bass" Gardner at Bernie Grundman Mastering.

"Rocketeer" premiered on the first weekend of October 2010 on Cherrytree Radio. Cherrytree Records and Interscope Records released the song as the second single from the album on October 9, 2010 for digital download in the United States. It was the third track of Free Wired, released on October 12. American contemporary hit and rhythmic contemporary radio stations began adding "Rocketeer" to their playlists on November 23, 2010, being released through the record labels. On January 11, 2011, a version of the song live at the Cherrytree House featuring Frankmusik was released in various countries. In the United Kingdom, the song was released on February 21, 2010, as a digital download for digital download by Cherrytree and Interscope. On March 11, 2010, a CD single with "Rocketeer" and its Frankmusik remix was released in Germany. On March 22 of that year, an EP containing six different remixes was released in the United States by the previously mentioned labels.

== Composition ==
"Rocketeer"
20-second sample of the "lovely" and "hummable" chorus by Ryan Tedder.

"Rocketeer" is a mid tempo piano ballad and pop-rap song. It begins at a slow tempo, evolving into a mid tempo, while showing "an upbeat outlook." According to the sheet music, the song is composed in the key of A minor, with a tempo of 96 beats per minute. The artists' vocal range spans from D5 to D6. "Rocketeer" features a "light piano line" on top of a "Euro-synthed" instrumental, and the keyboard chords of the track have been interpreted as having a resemblance to the ones in Justin Bieber's "Somebody to Love" (2010). This led to speculation that "Rocketeer" copied from the song; however, both tracks were produced by the Stereotypes, with the latter being the first. The track has a "mellow, romantic beat", "contemplative nature" and an enthusiastic "direction". The verses have been described as "easy-flowing rhymes", with Far East Movement rapping about "going on an intergalactic journey through space". Tedder's falsetto vocals on the "lovely" and "hummable" chorus were noted by writers, being described as "sweet" and "oh-so-charming". The falsetto allowed him to come up with "dreamy imagery", in the lyrics "Take my hand, close your eyes/With you right here, I'm a rocketeer." AllMusic's David Jeffries affirmed Tedder's vocals resembled the ones by Mike Posner. Far East Movement's verses contain references to "Like A G6" by "rhyming 'Super Mario' with 'Cardio' and 'Geronimo'". "Lyrically, the theme of "Rocketeer" is intended to "represent different things for different people", so it could be a love or motivation song.

== Reception ==
"Rocketeer" has received generally positive reviews from music critics. Nick Levine of Digital Spy gave the song four stars out of five, with him noticing the similarities between the track and the chorus by Bruno Mars on B.o.B's "Nothin' on You". Polly Weeks from The Shuttle dubbed the collaborations as "the highlights of the record", including "Rocketeer". AllMusic's Jeffries shared Weeks's opinion. Idolator's Robbie Daw thought "Far East Movement's shift toward live(-sounding) instrumentation" was enjoyable. Daw continued, "It's kind of like the chill, bleary-eyed comedown the day after a big bash, when you just want to lay around and listen to some mellow tunes." The staff of Complex affirmed that the track "is sure to win over the hearts of many teenage girls". Anthony Osei, writing for the same website, called it "catchy". Marvin Vasquez of Campus Circle affirmed "the beauty of this tune, because it can bring unique meaning to each listener".

Sharyar Rivzi from the Dallas Observer was disappointed with the track, giving it a "B". Rivzi pointed out the "tame" sound after the single "Like A G6", the use of only "four piano chords" and the "oh-so-charming voice" of Tedder on the chorus. Lyrically wise he found it to be "needy and hollow", and a "disappointing use of the spacey-love theme". Rivzi also criticized Bruno Mars's songwriting on "Rocketeer" due to its "syrupy charm". Regarding Mars's demo, Daw said the song would still be a "big hit" with the latter's vocals. Biance Gracie from Fuse said it "isn't as punchy, you can't deny that those soaring vocals carry a ton of emotion". Gracie considered it to be Mars's best collaboration as of 2016. At the 2012 ASCAP Pop Music Awards, "Rocketeer" was one of the winners of Most Performed Songs.

== Commercial performance ==
In the United States, "Rocketeer" spent 20 weeks on the chart and peaked at number seven on the Billboard Hot 100, on February 19, 2011. The song reached its highest peak on the US Rhythmic at number six, spending 20 weeks on the chart. The track further debuted on the Mainstream Top 40 and Hot Rap Songs, peaking at number seven and nine, respectively. As of 2011, it has sold 668,000 units in the United States. The song peaked at number 22 on the Canadian Hot 100, spending 20 weeks on the chart. It also entered and peaked at number 13 on the Canada Hot AC and at number 14 on the CHR/Top 40. The song debuted at its peak of number ten on the Japan Hot 100.

"Rocketeer" entered at its peak of number four on the UK R&B Chart, and at the peak position of number 14 on the UK Singles Chart, both on February 20, 2011. The song peaked at number 11 on the Slovakia Rádio Top 100 chart. The single debut at its peak, number 19, on the Scottish Singles Charts. The song entered at number 30 on the Australian Singles Chart and peaked at number 14 on its seventh week on the chart. It was certified platinum by the Australian Recording Industry Association (ARIA). The song entered at its peak of number four on the New Zealand Single Chart, becoming certified two times platinum by the Recorded Music NZ (RMNZ). The track peaked at number seven on Gaon's South Korea International Chart.

== Music video ==
On August 26, 2010, it was reported the music video for "Rocketeer" was being shot in Downtown Los Angeles. Far East Movement wrote "the treatment" for the video, using a skate to show everyone the "Free Wired Downtown LA" that inspires them, "with different dreamers" they met which are part of the "free wired LA". It was directed by Marc Klasfeld and premiered via YouTube on November 1, 2010.

The music video begins with a young couple, which will have to go in their separated ways as the girl needs to move to Japan due to her job. During the video, the boyfriend searches trash cans and asks several people, including DJ Quik and Bobby Hundreds, for materials to build a "make-shift" jet pack to get to his girlfriend after she leaves. In the end of the music video, he rides his skateboard and goes "off into the night, leaving a trail of sparks behind him". The video is intercalated with various shots of Tedder playing the piano as he sings the chorus, and Far East Movement, as well as "cameos from various influencers", such as Philip Wang and Wesley Chan from Wong Fu Productions, American music persona Martin Kierszenbaum and American artist David Choe.

Daw said the music video is "every bit as sweet as the song itself". Jillian Mapes from Billboard stated that the song has a "fitting video". Complex commented that the scenes of Downtown L.A. and the "cameos from influencers" are worth seeing. Sharyar Rvzi of the Dallas Observer said that Tedder's hat on the video made him look like a "pretentious flatterer". Some brand ads were retroactive digitally inserted in the music video after an agreement between Universal Music Group, media-tech company Mirriad and French advertising firm Havas. The adds have a limited lifespan and can be removed or replaced. People may see different adds in the video, according to their localization. Instead of the "native in-video advertising", a company could buy "spots" inside the video.

In 2011, Far East Movement went on to release a short film for "Rockteer" entitled "Rocketeer (LA Dreamer Short Film)", which features the Santa Monica Pier, Korean barbecue restaurants, Melrose Avenue, and downtown Los Angeles in a dedication to their hometown. For Complex, Anthony Osei said "it came out great". To shoot the video, the group enlisted the help of Daniel DPD Park to capture the footage from the town. They also used their old microphones and amplfiers to record the new version of the song in the backroom, thus Far East Movement sounded like when they started making music. The version of the song used for the video was dubbed "stripped-down and less glossy". The video depicts their "slow and steady grind", including Far East Movement's "stylistic evolution, pop savvy and a decade of performing every venue in Los Angeles." It features a cameo by American rapper Snoop Dogg.

== Live performances and other use ==
On January 11, 2011, Far East Movement performed "Rocketeer" on Jimmy Kimmel Live! with Frankmusik singing the chorus. On February 7, 2011, they also sang the track on Conan, hosted by Conan O'Brien. It was followed by a performance of the song at the 2011 NBA All-Star Game, with American singer and songwriter Miguel replacing Tedder for the chorus. Billboard considered it the fourth-best performance, tied with the one by CeeLo Green. On March 13, 2011, the group sang the track at Show! Music Core. On May 23 of that year, Far East Movement performed "Rocketeer" with Tedder, following it up with "If I Was You (OMG)" alongside Snoop Dogg at the 2011 Billboard Music Awards. On August 21, 2011, Far East Movement performed "Rocketeer" on the tenth episode of the Disney Channel TV program So Random!, with Miguel replacing Tedder on the chorus. The group performed the track at Java Soulnation 2013. In 2016, Far East Movement performed the song on the South Korean music program You Hee-yeol's Sketchbook; Urban Zakapa sang the chorus. In 2012, the track was part of the "Awesome" campaign that was promoted by Malaysian-based low-cost airline AirAsia. In 2014, the song was included in the Filipino film, Diary ng Panget, which was covered by James Reid and Nadine Lustre. In 2022, American rapper Fivio Foreign sampled "Rocketeer" for his song "Paris to Tokyo", featuring The Kid LAROI, from his debut studio album B.I.B.L.E..

== Formats and track listings ==
Digital download
No.	Title	Length
1.	"Rocketeer" (featuring Ryan Tedder)	3:31

CD single
No.	Title	Length
1.	"Rocketeer" (featuring Ryan Tedder)	3:31
2.	"Rocketeer" (featuring Ryan Tedder) (Frankmusik Remix)	3:23

Digital download – Rocketeer (Remixes) EP
No.	Title	Length
1.	"Rocketeer" (Chew Fu Remix) (featuring Ryan Tedder)	5:34
2.	"Rocketeer" (Frankmusik Remix) (featuring Ryan Tedder)	3:23
3.	"Rocketeer" (DJ Enferno Remix) (featuring Ryan Tedder)	4:33
4.	"Rocketeer" (Ruxpin Remix) (featuring Ryan Tedder)	4:39
5.	"Rocketeer" (Z-Trip Afterburner Dub Remix) (featuring Ryan Tedder)	3:12
6.	"Rocketeer" (DJ Spider & Mr. Best Remix) (featuring Ryan Tedder)	5:21

Digital download – Rocketeer (Live at the Cherrytree House)
No.	Title	Length
1.	"Rocketeer" (Live at Cherrytree House) (featuring Frankmusik)	3:47

== Personnel ==
Credits adapted from the liner notes of Rocketeer.

- Far East Movement – lead vocals
- Ryan Tedder – lead vocals
- Jae Choung – songwriting
- James Roh – songwriting
- Kevin Nishimura – songwriting
- Virman Coquia – songwriting
- Jeremy Reeves – songwriting
- Johnathan Yip – songwriting
- Ray Romulus – songwriting
- Bruno Mars – songwriting
- Philip Lawrence – songwriting
- The Stereotypes – production, recording
- The Smeezingtons – production
- Jaycen Joshua – mixing
- Giancarlo Lino – mixing assistant
- Jesus Garnica – mixing assistant
- Brian "Big Bass" Gardner – mastering

== Charts ==
=== Weekly charts ===
List of chart positions
Chart (2010–11)	Peak position
Australia (ARIA)	14
Belgium (Ultratip Bubbling Under Flanders)	9
Belgium (Ultratip Bubbling Under Wallonia)	9
Canada Hot 100 (Billboard)	22
Canada CHR/Top 40 (Billboard)	4
Canada Hot AC (Billboard)	13
Czech Republic Airplay (ČNS IFPI)	50
Germany (GfK)	40
Japan Hot 100 (Billboard)	10
Netherlands (Single Top 100)	47
New Zealand (Recorded Music NZ)	4
Scottish Singles Sales (Official Charts)	19
South Korea International (Gaon)	7
Slovakia Airplay (ČNS IFPI)	11
UK Hip Hop/R&B (Official Charts)	4
UK Singles (Official Charts)	14
US Billboard Hot 100	7
US Adult Pop Airplay (Billboard)	27
US Dance Airplay (Billboard)	21
US Hot Rap Songs (Billboard)	9
US Pop Airplay (Billboard)	7
US Rhythmic Airplay (Billboard)	6

List of chart position for Frankmusic version
Chart (2011)	Position
South Korea International (Gaon)	25

List of chart position for Mars demo
Chart (2010)	Position
Canada (Canadian Hot 100)	85

=== Year-end charts ===
List of chart positions
Chart (2010)	Position
South Korea International (Gaon)	66
Chart (2011)	Position
Canada (Canadian Hot 100)	79
Japan (Japan Hot 100)	88
South Korea International (Gaon)	27
US Billboard Hot 100	58
US Mainstream Top 40 (Billboard)	41
US Rhythmic (Billboard)	34

== Certifications ==
List of certifications
Region	Certification	Certified units/sales
Australia (ARIA)	Platinum	70,000^{^}
Canada (Music Canada)	Platinum	80,000^{‡}
New Zealand (RMNZ)	2× Platinum	60,000^{‡}
^{^} Shipments figures based on certification alone.^{‡} Sales+streaming figures based on certification alone.

== Release history ==
List of release history, showing region(s), date(s), format(s), version(s) and label(s)
Region	Date	Format	Version	Label(s)	Ref.
United States	October 9, 2010	Digital download	Original	Cherrytree; Interscope	
United States	November 23, 2010	Contemporary hit radio	Original	Cherrytree; Interscope	
United States	November 23, 2010	Rhythmic contemporary	Original	Cherrytree; Interscope	
Various	January 1, 2011	Digital download	Live	Cherrytree; Interscope	
United Kingdom	February 21, 2010	Digital download	Original	Cherrytree; Interscope	
Germany	March 11, 2011	CD single	Original	Cherrytree; Interscope	
United States	March 22, 2011	Digital download	Remixes	Cherrytree; Interscope	
