= This Is Arashi =

Studio album by Arashi
- Released: November 3, 2020
- Length: 42:39
- Language: Japanese; English
- Label: J Storm
- Producer: Julian Bunetta; Andreas Carlsson; D'Mile; Sam Hollander; Bruno Mars; Grant Michaels; Erik Lidbom; Rami Yacoub

Arashi chronology
Arashi Reborn Vol.1 (2020)	This Is Arashi (2020)

Arashi studio album chronology
Untitled (2017)	This Is Arashi (2020)

Singles from This Is Arashi
- 1. "Brave" Released: September 11, 2019; 2. "Turning Up" Released: November 3, 2019; 3. "In the Summer" Released: July 24, 2020; 4. "Kite" Released: July 29, 2020; 5. "Whenever You Call" Released: September 18, 2020; 6. "Party Starters" Released: October 30, 2020

This Is Arashi (Japanese: This Is 嵐) is the seventeenth and final studio album by Japanese idol group Arashi, released through J Storm on November 3, 2020.

== Album ==
It was the group's final recording before entering an indefinite hiatus on December 31, 2020. It was preceded by and includes the singles "Brave"; "Turning Up"; their first song primarily in English, "In the Summer"; "Kite"; their first entirely English song, "Whenever You Call"; and "Party Starters". "Do You...?" served as the lead song upon the album's release on November 3.

The limited edition of the album includes a second disc with all songs from Arashi's 2020 digital EP Arashi Reborn Vol.1 and the other "Reborn" re-recordings of their earlier tracks, as well as a DVD or Blu-ray featuring the music videos for the singles.

== Reception ==
This Is Arashi debuted at number one on the Oricon Albums Chart, selling over 699,000 copies in its first week.

The album was released for digital download and streaming on December 11, 2020.

== Promotion ==
An online concert pre-recorded without an audience at the Japan National Stadium in Tokyo was streamed in promotion of the album on November 3, the day of the album's release. The concert, AraFes (short for Arashi Festival), had been postponed from May 2020 due to the COVID-19 pandemic.

Arashi performed "Do You...?" on Music Station on November 6.

== Track listing ==
Standard edition / Disc one
No.	Title	Writer(s)	Length
1.	"Show Time"	Akira; Singo Kubota; Satoru Kurihara	3:43
2.	"Turning Up"	Erik Lidbom; Andreas Carlsson; Funk Uchino; Sho Sakurai	3:03
3.	"I Can't Wait for Christmas"	Miwaflower; DWB; Mike Macdermid; Julie Morrison	3:46
4.	"Whenever You Call"	Bruno Mars; D'Mile	3:15
5.	"Itsuka Byōshin no Au Koro" (いつか秒針のあう頃; Someday When the Second Hand Meets)	Rami Yacoub; Shiho Otowa; Sho Sakurai	3:30
6.	"In the Summer"	Rami Yacoub; Gregory Hein; Funk Uchino	4:49
7.	"Kite" (カイト; Kaito)	Kenshi Yonezu	4:43
8.	"Brave"	Goro.T; Sho Sakurai; Figge Boström	4:34
9.	"Party Starters"	Sam Hollander; Grant Michaels; Uchino; Sho Sakurai	3:14
10.	"Do You...?"	Atsushi Shimada; MiNE; Sho Sakurai; Takuya Harada	3:58
11.	"The Music Never Ends"	Julian Bunetta; John Ryan; Uchino	4:04
Total length:			42:39

Disc two (Limited edition only)
No.	Title	Writer(s)	Length
1.	"Turning Up" (R3hab remix)	Erik Lidbom; Andreas Carlsson; Sho Sakurai; Funk Uchino	2:46
2.	"A-ra-shi: Reborn"	J&T; Kōji Makaino; Andreas Carlsson; Sho Sakurai	3:25
3.	"A Day in Our Life: Reborn"	Shun; Shuya; Andreas Carlsson; Sho Sakurai	3:30
4.	"One Love: Reborn"	Youth Case; Yusuke Kato; Andreas Carlsson	3:22
5.	"Love So Sweet: Reborn"	Spin; Youth Case; Ellen Shipley	3:26
6.	"Face Down: Reborn"	Eltvo; Albi Albertsson; Royce.H; Vincent Stein; Konstantin Scherer; Ellen Shipley	3:53
Total length:			20:22

Disc three / DVD / Blu-ray (Limited edition only)
No.	Title	Length
1.	"Do You...?" (Music video + making)
2.	"Brave" (Music video)
3.	"Kite" (Music video)
4.	"Turning Up" (Music video)
5.	"In the Summer" (Music video)
6.	"Whenever You Call" (Music video)
7.	"Party Starters" (Music video)

== Charts ==
=== Weekly charts ===
Weekly chart performance of This Is Arashi
Chart (2020)	Peak position
Japanese Albums (Oricon)	1
Japanese Hot Albums (Billboard Japan)	1

=== Year-end charts ===
Year-end chart performance of This Is Arashi
Chart (2020)	Position
Japanese Albums (Oricon)	2
Japanese Hot Albums (Billboard Japan)	3
