= Renata Sorrah =

Brazilian actress (born 1947)

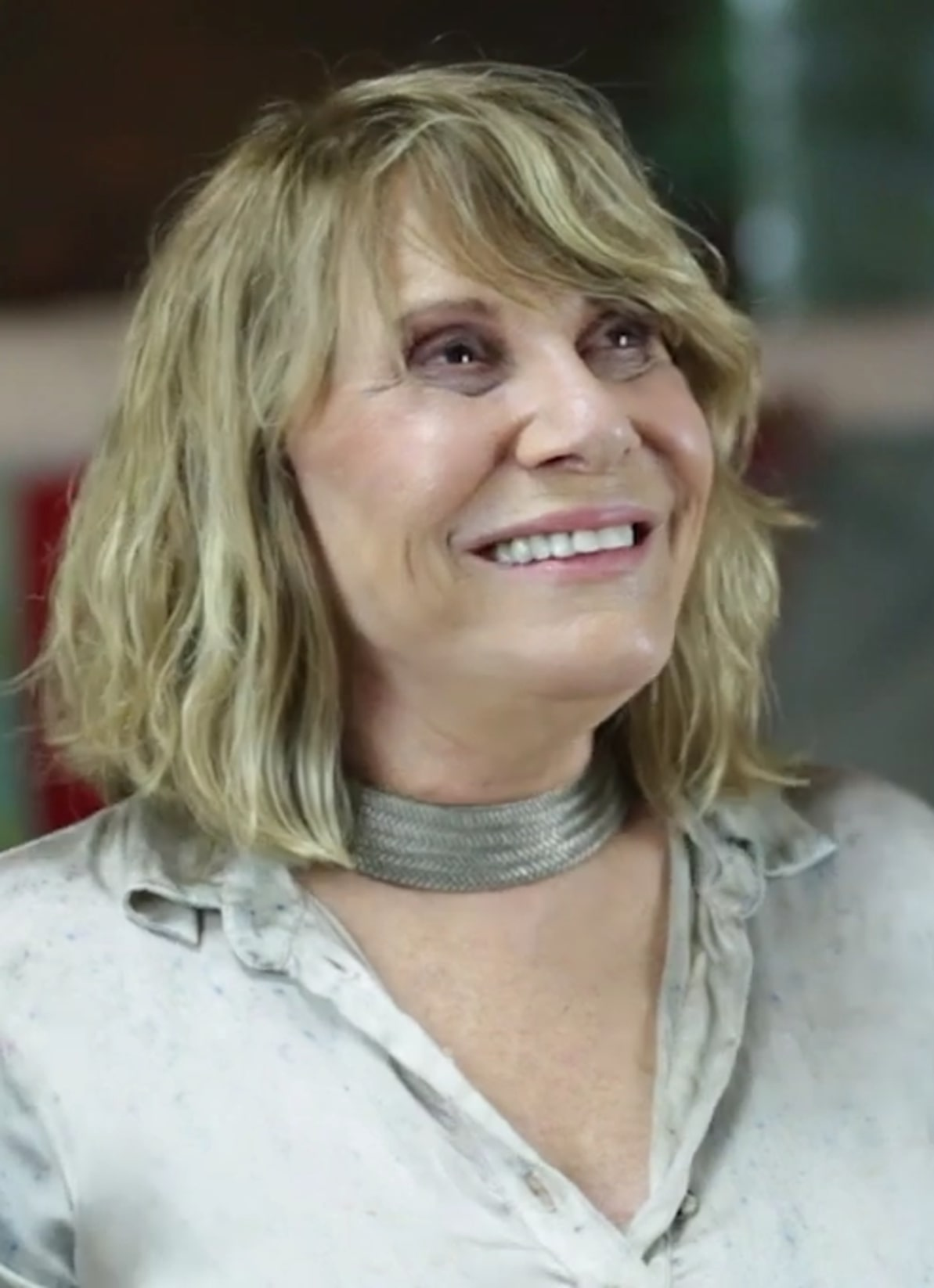
- Sorrah in 2019.
- Born: Renata Leonardo Pereira Sochaczewski; 21 February 1947 (age 79); Rio de Janeiro, Brazil
- Occupation: Actress
- Years active: 1967–present
- Spouses: Carlos Vereza (m. 1969; sep. 1971) Marcos Paulo (m. 1981; div. 1984) Euclydes Marinho (m. 1986; div. 1991)
- Children: 1
- Relatives: Deborah Evelyn (niece)

Renata Leonardo Pereira Sochaczewski (born 21 February 1947), known professionally as Renata Sorrah, is a Brazilian actress. She is best known for portraying Nazaré Tedesco in Senhora do Destino (2004).

== Early life ==
Sorrah was born in Rio de Janeiro, to Míriam Leonardo Pereira, who is of Portuguese ancestry and Peter Sochaczewski, a Polish immigrant.

In 1964, she joined a cultural exchange program and moved to Los Angeles, where she took dramatic arts classes and finished her studies. At that time California was the heart of the hippie movement and that influenced Sorrah's style.

When Sorrah returned to Brazil in 1967, she saw that Brazilian cultural scene had hippie ideals. Even though she hadn't been one, she adopted their outfits.

== Personal life ==
Sorrah was married three times. She has a daughter, Mariana Simões, whose father is director Marcos Paulo.

In May 2023, it was widely reported that Sorrah had come out as bisexual. However, in June 2023, in an interview with O Globo she clarified that the press had got it wrong, and that she had not made such a declaration.

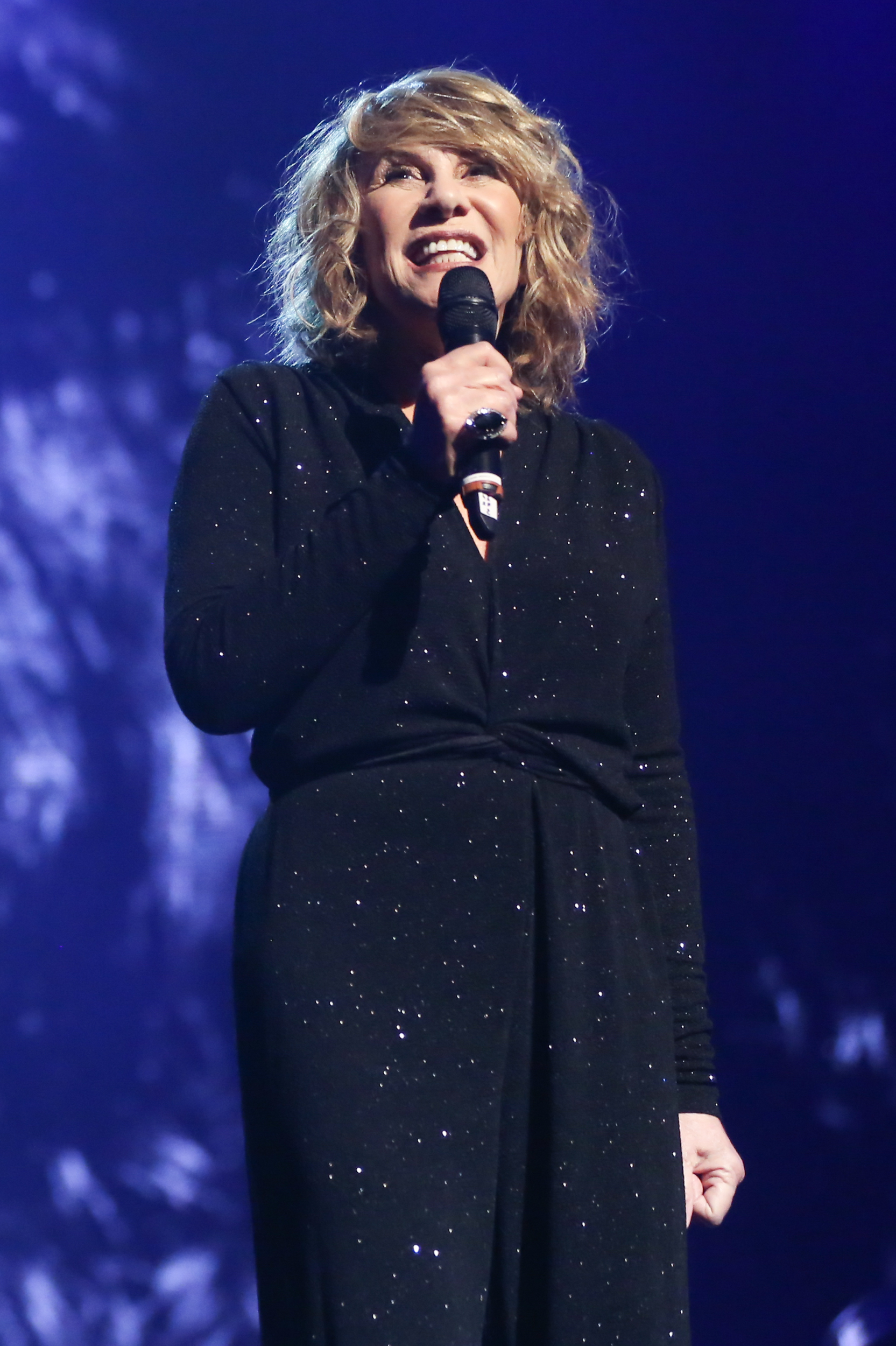
Renata Sorrah in 2015.

== Selected filmography ==
- Killed the Family and Went to the Movies (1969)
- Avaete, Seed of Revenge (1985)
- Vale Tudo (1988)
- Rainha da Sucata (1990)
- Pedra sobre Pedra (1992)
- Pátria Minha (1994)
- A Indomada (1997)
- Andando nas Nuvens (1999)
- Um Anjo Caiu do Céu (2001)
- Desejos de Mulher (2002)
- Madame Satã (2002)
- Nina (2004)
- Senhora do Destino (2004)
- Páginas da Vida (2006)
- Duas Caras (2007)
- Fina Estampa (2011)
- Saramandaia (2013)
- Geração Brasil (2014)
- A Regra do Jogo (2015)
- Segundo Sol (2018)
- Diário de um Confinado (2020)
- Filhas de Eva (2021)
- Vai na Fé (2023)

== Meme ==
Sorrah was featured in a meme, "Math Lady", that went viral in the 2010s. The meme has its origins in a scene from the 2004 telenovela Senhora do Destino, which was widely popular in Brazil at the time, receiving high ratings even in reruns. Nazaré Tedesco, Sorrah's character in the show, is one of the most famous villains in the history of Brazilian telenovelas, and different memes involving her are popular in the country. However, this particular meme, which shows the actress with a confused look, usually accompanied by overwhelming mathematical formulas, has gone beyond Brazilian borders, being used internationally. According to the website Know Your Meme, the oldest known use of the meme as a reaction date back to October 31, 2013.
