= Brave (Arashi song) =

2019 single by Arashi

- Regular edition cover

Single by Arashi

from the album This Is Arashi
- Released: September 11, 2019
- Length: 4:33
- Label: J Storm
- Songwriters: Goro.T; Sho Sakurai; Figge Boström

Arashi singles chronology
| "Kimi no Uta" (2018) | "Brave" (2019) | "Turning Up" (2019) |

"Brave" is a song by Japanese boy band Arashi, released as a single through J Storm on September 11, 2019. It serves as the theme song for Nippon TV's coverage of the 2019 Rugby World Cup. It is the band's first release to be available in an edition including a Blu-ray.

The single debuted atop the weekly Oricon Singles Chart, selling 667,615 copies in its first week.

== Background ==
The song was announced in October 2018, and was performed live for the first time the following month.

== Composition ==
The song features a self-composed rap by Sho Sakurai, who called it "an unusual single for Arashi. It is a rough and manly piece of music...I wrote the song while thinking about all the players who will be fighting hard, like when they're in a scrum".

== Commercial performance ==
The song sold 667,615 copies in the first week, reaching number one on the Oricon weekly albums chart. It is also Arashi's first number-one single on the combined singles chart, which was established in 2019.

== Track listing ==
Regular edition
| No. | Title | Length |
|---|---|---|
| 1. | "Brave" |
| 2. | "Brave" (karaoke version) |

Limited edition CD
| No. | Title | Length |
|---|---|---|
| 1. | "Brave" |

Limited edition DVD/Blu-ray
| No. | Title | Length |
|---|---|---|
| 1. | "Brave" (music video and making of) | 54:00 |

== Charts ==
| Chart (2019) | Peak position |
|---|---|
| Japan (Japan Hot 100) | 2 |
| Japan (Oricon) | 1 |
| South Korean Albums (Gaon) | 55 |
