= Turning Up (Arashi song) =

2019 single by Arashi

Single by Arashi

from the album This Is Arashi
- Language: English; Japanese
- Released: November 3, 2019
- Length: 3:02
- Label: J Storm
- Songwriters: Andreas Carlsson; Erik Lidbom; Funk Uchino; Sho Sakurai
- Producer: Erik Lidbom

Arashi singles chronology
"Brave" (2019)	"Turning Up" (2019)	"A-ra-shi: Reborn" (2019)

Music video
- "Turning Up" on YouTube

"Turning Up" is a song by Japanese boy band Arashi, released as a single on November 3, 2019. It is the band's first digital single of their career, and follows the band opening official social media accounts and making their music available for streaming and download for the first time.

== Background ==
The song was announced during a YouTube Live press conference on November 3, where Arashi made several announcements, notably that they had set up accounts on all major social media platforms (Twitter, Facebook, Instagram, Weibo and TikTok), and all 65 of their singles would become available to stream later the same day, making their music officially available outside of Asia for the first time. The music video was also premiered later the same day through the band's channel on YouTube.

== Music video ==
The music video was released on November 3, 2019, the same day as the song. The video begins with a news broadcast about a "storm" (Arashi, 嵐 in kanji, meaning "storm" in Japanese). Part of the video was shot on Hollywood Boulevard in Los Angeles.

In addition to the music video, two making-of videos were uploaded to the band's official YouTube channel, with one based in Los Angeles, and the other in Tokyo. An official choreography video was also made available.

== Remix version ==
"Turning Up R3hab Remix"
- Remix by R3hab for Arashi

Remix by Arashi
- Language: English; Japanese
- Released: January 24, 2020
- Length: 2:46
- Label: J Storm
- Songwriters: Andreas Carlsson; Erik Lidbom; Funk Uchino
- Producer: Erik Lidbom

Arashi singles chronology
"A-ra-shi: Reborn" (2019)	"Turning Up R3hab Remix" (2020)

Music video
- "Turning Up R3hab Remix" on YouTube

On January 24, 2020, Arashi released a remix version of the song, by DJ, record producer and re-mixer R3hab, in digital download, streaming, and as a music video in YouTube. The remix version lacks the rap made by Sho Sakurai for the original version.

The remix peaked at number 14 on the Billboard Japan Hot 100 and topped on the Billboard Japan Top Download Songs.

== Chart performance ==
On May 13, 2026, Oricon revealed that the song had reached 100 million streams, making it their seventh song to reach the milestone.

== Charts ==
Chart (2019–2020)	Peak position
Hong Kong (HKRIA)	22
Japan (Japan Hot 100)	2
US World Digital Song Sales (Billboard)	10
