= Party Starters =

2020 song by Arashi

Single by Arashi

from the album This Is Arashi
- Released: October 30, 2020
- Length: 3:04
- Label: J Storm
- Songwriters: Sam Hollander; Grant Michaels; Funk Uchino; Sho Sakurai
- Producers: Sam Hollander; Grant Michaels

Arashi singles chronology
"Whenever You Call" (2020)	"Party Starters" (2020)	"Five" (2026)

Music video
- "Party Starters" on YouTube

"Party Starters" is a song by J-pop boy band Arashi, from the group's seventeenth studio album, This Is Arashi (2020). It was written by Sam Hollander, Grant Michaels, Funk Uchino, Sho Sakurai, and produced by Sam Hollander and Grant Michaels. It was released by J Storm as a digital single on October 30, 2020.

== Release ==
"Party Starters" was originally set to be released on June 12, 2020, however, due to the George Floyd protests and the Black Lives Matter movement, the release was postponed to October 30, 2020.

== Music video ==
The music video for "Party Starters" was released on November 3, 2020.

== Charts ==
Chart performance of "Party Starters"
Chart (2020)	Peak position
Japan (Japan Hot 100)	7
Japan (Oricon Combined Singles)	7
Japan (Oricon Digital Singles)	2
