= Kite (Arashi song) =

2020 single by Arashi

Single by Arashi

from the album This Is Arashi
- B-side: "Journey to Harmony"; "Sounds of Joy"; "Bokura no Hibi"
- Released: July 29, 2020
- Length: 4:43
- Label: J Storm
- Songwriter: Kenshi Yonezu

Arashi singles chronology
"In the Summer" (2020)	"Kite" (2020)	"Whenever You Call" (2020)

"Kite" (カイト) is the 58th single by Japanese boy band Arashi. It was released on July 29, 2020, through J Storm. The release was announced on their Johnny's official page, as well as on their social media profiles.

== Background ==
The song "Kite" served as the theme song for NHK's coverage of the 2020 Summer Olympics, including the special program "2020 Stadium" (2020スタジアム) hosted by the group. It was first performed in 70th NHK Kōhaku Uta Gassen, December 31, 2019.

"Journey to Harmony", the other song included in the single, was performed as a celebratory song for the enthronement of the new Emperor, in November 2019. It is the third part of a 13-minute composition called "Ray of water".

== Content and promotion ==
"Kite" was released on July 29, 2020. The single was made available for pre-order on June 15, 2020. The limited edition comes in two versions, both held in an LP sized jacket and containing a DVD or Blu-ray with the music video and making-of video for "Kite", and a 16-page lyrics booklet. A fan-club limited edition containing a 56-page book titled "2020 Arashi and Tokyo Sky" was also available for pre-order from June 15, 2020, to June 21, 2020, but sold out on the first day. All three versions' covers were painted by member Satoshi Ohno.

Arashi performed "Kite" on Music Station on July 24, 2020.

== Chart performance ==
"Kite" debuted at number 86 on the Billboard Japan Hot 100 chart on December 30, 2019, and rose to number 25 on January 13, 2020.

On July 28, 2020, the single debuted at number one on the Oricon Daily Singles Chart, selling 680,797 copies on its first day. "Kite" debuted at number one on the Oricon Singles Chart, with 910,000 copies sold in its first week. It became Arashi's 47th consecutive and 54th overall number-one single, extending their record of the most number-one singles in Japan. It also marked Arashi's largest opening sales week, surpassing their previous record of 756,000 copies with "Calling / Breathless" (2013). On August 29, the single sold additional 138,007 copies, becoming the group's first single to sell a million copies by selling 1,111,451 copies.

The song was Arashi's second to reach 100 million streams.

== Track listing ==
Regular edition
No.	Title	Lyrics	Music	Arrangement	Length
1.	"Kite"	Kenshi Yonezu	Yonezu	Yonezu; Yuta Bandoh	4:43
2.	"Journey to Harmony"	Yoshikazu Okada	Yoko Kanno	Kanno	5:29
3.	"Sounds of Joy"	Funk Uchino	Susumu Kawaguchi; Andreas Ohrn; Henrik Smith; Kota Sahara	Tomoki Ishizuka	4:17
4.	"Bokura no Hibi" (僕らの日々, "Our Days")	Nai-T	Nai-T	Hirofumi Sasaki	4:13
5.	"Kite" (karaoke)
6.	"Sounds of Joy" (karaoke)
7.	"Bokura no Hibi" (karaoke)

Limited edition CD
No.	Title	Length
1.	"Kite"

Limited edition DVD/Blu-ray
No.	Title	Length
1.	"Kite" (music video and making of)

== Charts ==
Chart (2020)	Peak position
Japan (Japan Hot 100)	1
Japan (Oricon)	1
