= Whenever You Call (Arashi song) =

2020 song by Arashi

Single by Arashi

from the album This Is Arashi
- Language: English
- Released: September 18, 2020
- Recorded: 2020
- Genre: J-pop
- Length: 3:13
- Label: J Storm
- Songwriters: Bruno Mars; D'Mile
- Producers: Bruno Mars; D'Mile

Arashi singles chronology
| "Kite" (2020) | "Whenever You Call" (2020) | "Party Starters" (2020) |

Music video
- "Whenever You Call" on YouTube

"Whenever You Call" is a song by the J-pop boy band Arashi, released as a digital single on September 18, 2020. Written and produced by Bruno Mars and D'Mile, the song is the group's first release with lyrics completely in English. The song was downloaded almost 59 thousand times within its first three days of release to reach the top spot in digital downloads and No. 6 on the Billboard Japan Hot 100.

== Personnel ==
Credits adapted from This is Arashi album liner notes:

- Bruno Mars - writer, producer
- D'Mile - writer, producer
- Serban Ghenea - mixing engineer
- John Hanes - engineer [for mix]
- Randy Merrill - mastering engineer

== Charts ==
Chart performance of "Whenever You Call"
| Chart (2020) | Peak position |
|---|---|
| Global 200 (Billboard) | 51 |
| Japan (Japan Hot 100) | 6 |
| Japan (Oricon Combined Singles) | 4 |
| Japan (Oricon Digital Singles) | 1 |
| US World Digital Song Sales (Billboard) | 10 |
