= Arashi Reborn Vol.1 =

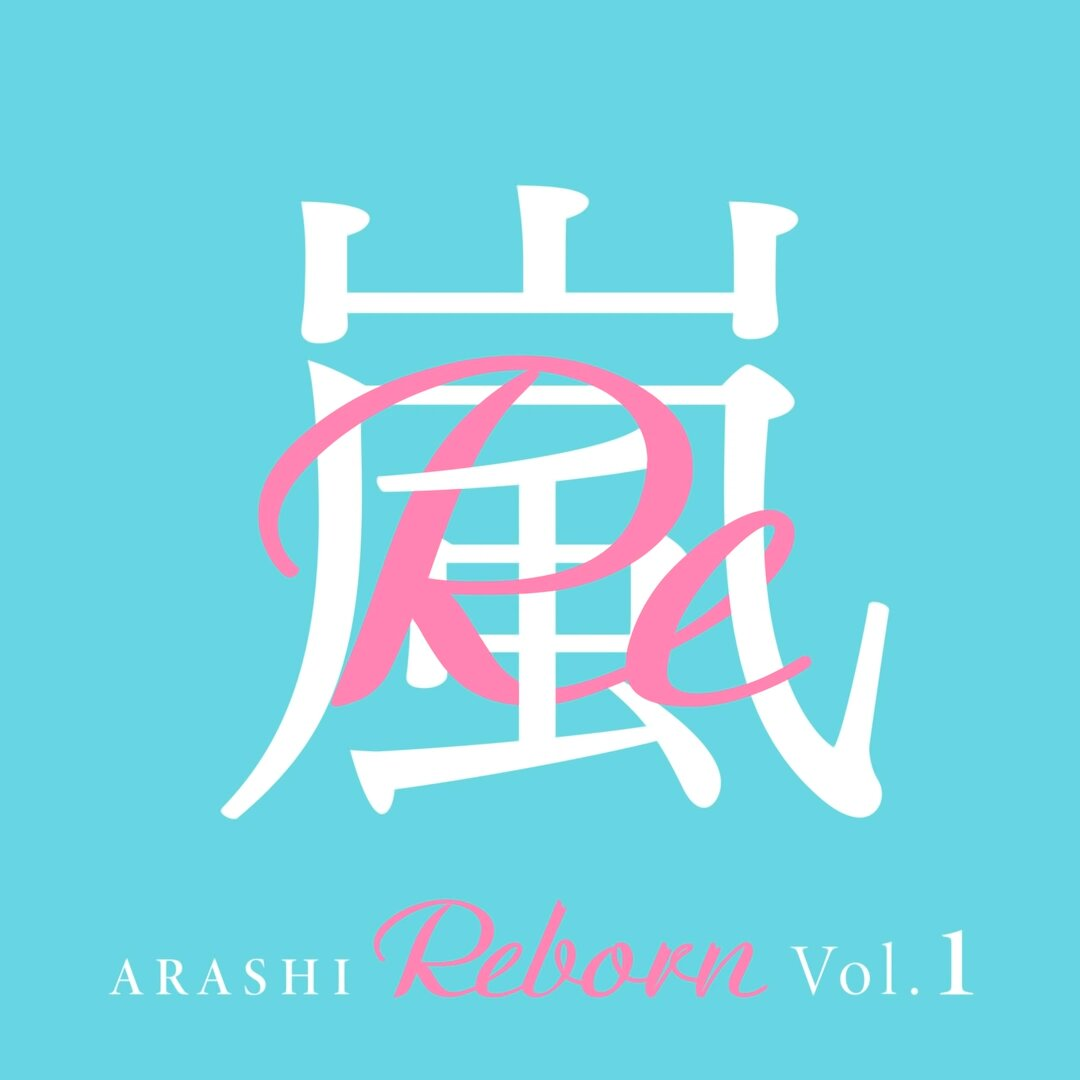

EP by Arashi
- Released: February 28, 2020
- Genre: J-pop
- Languages: English; Japanese
- Label: J Storm

Arashi chronology
5x20 All the Best!! 1999–2019 (2019)	Arashi Reborn Vol.1 (2020)	This Is Arashi (2020)

Music video
- "A-RA-SHI: Reborn [Official Audio]" on YouTube; A Day in Our Life: Reborn [Official Lyric Video] on YouTube; One Love: Reborn [Official Lyric Video] on YouTube

Arashi Reborn Vol.1 extended play is the first part of the "Reborn" Project by Arashi. It comprises three songs, one of which, "A-ra-shi: Reborn", was released as a single on December 20, 2019.

The release was via digital download and streaming, with two lyric videos to also be released on the Arashi YouTube channel, on February 28, 2020.

The songs "A Day in Our Life: Reborn" and "Our Love: Reborn" from the EP ranked 1 and 2, respectively, in the "Overall download single daily" ranking chart from Oricon in their 1st day of release. All three topped the weekly chart for "digital single".

== Track listing ==
Arashi Reborn Vol.1 track listing
No.	Title	Writer(s)	Length
1.	"A-ra-shi: Reborn"	Andreas Carlsson; Erik Lidbom; Geek Boy Al Swettenham; J&T; Koji Makaino; Sho Sakurai	3:26
2.	"A Day in Our Life: Reborn"	Shun; Shuya; Andreas Carlsson; Geek Boy Al Swettenham; Sho Sakurai	3:30
3.	"One Love: Reborn"	Youth Case; Yusuke Kato; Andreas Carlsson; Erik Lidbom	3:22
Total length:			10:18

== Charts ==
Sales chart performance for Arashi Reborn Vol.1
Chart (2020)	Peak position
Japan Hot Albums (Billboard Japan)	6

== See also ==
- 2020 in Japanese music § February
