= Free Wired =

2010 studio album by Far East Movement

Studio album by Far East Movement
- Released: October 12, 2010
- Genres: Hip-hop; electronic
- Length: 36:09
- Labels: Cherrytree; Interscope
- Producers: The Stereotypes; the Cataracs; the Smeezingtons; Roger Sanchez; Fernando Garibay; DJ White Shadow; Cherry Cherry Boom Boom

Far East Movement chronology
Animal (2009)	Free Wired (2010)	Dirty Bass (2012)

Singles from Free Wired
- 1. "Like a G6" Released: April 13, 2010; 2. "Rocketeer" Released: October 9, 2010; 3. "If I Was You (OMG)" Released: March 20, 2011

Professional ratings
Review scores
Source	Rating
AllMusic	3.5/5 stars
Billboard	4/5 stars
Entertainment Weekly	B−
Robert Christgau	B+

Free Wired is the third studio album and major label debut by the American group Far East Movement, released on October 12, 2010, by Cherrytree Records and Interscope Records.

The album debuted at number 24 on the Billboard 200, with sales of 17,000.

The first single "Like a G6" was released on April 13, 2010, and reached number 1 on the Billboard Hot 100. The second official single was "Rocketeer", which featured Ryan Tedder from OneRepublic. The music video for the song premiered on VEVO and YouTube on October 29, 2010. "Rocketeer" reached number 7 on the Billboard Hot 100.

== Background ==
Speaking about the album in March 2011 to Blues & Soul, Kev Nish of Far East Movement stated: "'Free Wired' was basically a slang-word we came up with back in the day, that we'd use whenever we'd do something that was outside the box, that was original, that was fresh, and that mashed-up things that maybe shouldn't have been mashed-up! Which is why, when it came to titling this album, it made so much sense! Because it really represented our lifestyle, represented what we listen to... You know, we'd basically go in the studio and take hip hop-style drums, electronic synths, alternative-style hooks and just – as I say – mash it all up!... So yeah, with 'Free Wired' you definitely get exactly what it says in the title!"

== Track listing ==
- All songs were written by Jae Choung, James Roh, Kevin Nishimura and Virman Coquia. Additional writers are noted below.

Standard edition
No.	Title	Writer(s)	Producer(s)	Length
1.	"Girls on the Dance Floor" (featuring the Stereotypes)	Bruno Mars; Jonathan Yip; Jeremy Reeves; Ray Romulus	The Stereotypes	3:54
2.	"Like a G6" (featuring the Cataracs and Dev)	David Singer-Vine; Niles Holowell-Dhar	The Cataracs	3:36
3.	"Rocketeer" (featuring Ryan Tedder)	B. Mars; J. Yip; J. Reeves; R. Romulus; Philip Lawrence	The Stereotypes; The Smeezingtons	3:31
4.	"If I Was You (OMG)" (featuring Snoop Dogg)	B. Mars; J. Yip; J. Reeves; R. Romulus; Calvin Broadus	The Stereotypes; The Smeezingtons	3:25
5.	"She Owns the Night" (featuring Mohombi)	J. Yip; J. Reeves; R. Romulus; Malcolm McDaniel	The Stereotypes	4:02
6.	"So What?"	J. Yip; J. Reeves; R. Romulus; Michael Diamond; Adam Horovitz; Adam Yauch	The Stereotypes	3:24
7.	"Don't Look Now" (featuring Keri Hilson)	Heather Bright; J. Yip; J. Reeves; R. Romulus	The Stereotypes	3:33
8.	"Fighting for Air" (featuring Vincent Frank)	Fernando Garibay; Michael Warren; J. Yip; J. Reeves; R. Romulus	Fernando Garibay; DJ White Shadow	3:45
9.	"White Flag" (featuring Kayla Kai)	Martin Kierszenbaum; J. Yip; J. Reeves; R. Romulus; Andrew "Pop" Wansel	Martin "Cherry Cherry Boom Boom" Kierszenbaum	3:48
10.	"2gether" (with Roger Sanchez featuring Kanobby)	Roger Sanchez; J. Yip; J. Reeves; R. Romulus	Roger Sanchez	3:05

iTunes Store U.S. bonus track
No.	Title	Producer(s)	Length
11.	"Go Ape" (featuring Lil Jon and Colette Carr)	The Stereotypes	3:30

International bonus track
No.	Title	Producer(s)	Length
11.	"2 Is Better" (featuring Natalia Kills and Ya Boy)	The Stereotypes	3:19

UK edition
No.	Title	Writer(s)	Producer(s)	Length
1.	"Girls on the Dance Floor" (featuring the Stereotypes)	Bruno Mars; Jonathan Yip; Jeremy Reeves; Ray Romulus	The Stereotypes	3:54
2.	"Like a G6" (featuring the Cataracs and Dev)	David Singer-Vine; Niles Holowell-Dhar	The Cataracs	3:36
3.	"Rocketeer" (featuring Ryan Tedder)	B. Mars; J. Yip; J. Reeves; R. Romulus; Philip Lawrence	The Stereotypes; The Smeezingtons	3:31
4.	"If I Was You (OMG)" (featuring Snoop Dogg)	B. Mars; J. Yip; J. Reeves; R. Romulus; Calvin Broadus	The Stereotypes; The Smeezingtons	3:25
5.	"She Owns the Night" (featuring Mohombi)	J. Yip; J. Reeves; R. Romulus; Malcolm McDaniel	The Stereotypes	4:02
6.	"So What?"	J. Yip; J. Reeves; R. Romulus; Michael Diamond; Adam Horovitz; Adam Yauch	The Stereotypes	3:24
7.	"Don't Look Now" (featuring Keri Hilson)	Heather Bright; J. Yip; J. Reeves; R. Romulus	The Stereotypes	3:33
8.	"Fighting for Air" (featuring Vincent Frank)	Fernando Garibay; Michael Warren; J. Yip; J. Reeves; R. Romulus	Fernando Garibay; DJ White Shadow	3:45
9.	"White Flag" (featuring Kayla Kai)	Martin Kierszenbaum; J. Yip; J. Reeves; R. Romulus	Martin "Cherry Cherry Boom Boom" Kierszenbaum	3:48
10.	"2 Is Better" (featuring Natalia Kills and Ya Boy)		The Stereotypes	3:19

Japanese edition
No.	Title	Writer(s)	Producer(s)	Length
1.	"Girls on the Dance Floor" (featuring the Stereotypes)	Bruno Mars; Jonathan Yip; Jeremy Reeves; Ray Romulus	The Stereotypes	3:54
2.	"Like a G6" (featuring The Cataracs and Dev)	David Singer-Vine; Niles Holowell-Dhar	The Cataracs	3:36
3.	"Rocketeer" (featuring Ryan Tedder)	B. Mars; J. Yip; J. Reeves; R. Romulus; Philip Lawrence	The Stereotypes; The Smeezingtons	3:31
4.	"If I Was You (OMG)" (featuring Snoop Dogg)	B. Mars; J. Yip; J. Reeves; R. Romulus; Calvin Broadus	The Stereotypes; The Smeezingtons	3:25
5.	"She Owns the Night" (featuring Mohombi)	J. Yip; J. Reeves; R. Romulus; Malcolm McDaniel	The Stereotypes	4:02
6.	"So What?"	J. Yip; J. Reeves; R. Romulus; Michael Diamond; Adam Horovitz; Adam Yauch	The Stereotypes	3:24
7.	"Don't Look Now" (featuring Keri Hilson)	Heather Bright; J. Yip; J. Reeves; R. Romulus	The Stereotypes	3:33
8.	"Fighting for Air" (featuring Vincent Frank)	Fernando Garibay; Michael Warren; J. Yip; J. Reeves; R. Romulus	Fernando Garibay; DJ White Shadow	3:45
9.	"White Flag" (featuring Kayla Kai)	Martin Kierszenbaum; J. Yip; J. Reeves; R. Romulus	Martin "Cherry Cherry Boom Boom" Kierszenbaum	3:48
10.	"2 Is Better" (featuring Natalia Kills and Ya Boy)		The Stereotypes	3:19
11.	"Go Ape" (featuring Lil Jon and Colette Carr)		The Stereotypes	3:30
12.	"Make It Bump" (featuring Koda Kumi)			4:05
13.	"Rocketeer (DJ Kaori's Party Mix)" (featuring Ryan Tedder)	B. Mars; J. Yip; J. Reeves; R. Romulus; P. Lawrence	DJ Kaori	3:22

== Samples and interpolations ==
"So What?"

- Contains elements of "So Whatcha Want" by Beastie Boys

"Don't Look Now"

- Contains additional vocals recorded by Bryan "The Beard" Jones

"Fighting For Air"

- Contains additional recording by Justin "Kanobby" Keitt

== Charts ==
Chart (2010)	Peak position
Australian ARIA Albums Chart	65
Canadian Albums Chart	16
UK Albums Chart	63
UK R&B Chart	8
US Billboard 200	24
US Billboard Top Rap Albums	4
