= A-ra-shi: Reborn =

2019 single by Arashi

Single by Arashi

from the album Arashi Reborn Vol.1
- Language: English; Japanese
- Released: December 20, 2019
- Length: 3:25
- Label: J Storm
- Songwriter(s): Andreas Carlsson; Erik Lidbom; Geek Boy Al Swettenham; J&T; Koji Makaino; Sho Sakurai
- Producer(s): Erik Lidbom; Geek Boy Al Swettenham

Arashi singles chronology
"Turning Up" (2019)	"A-ra-shi: Reborn" (2019)	"Love So Sweet: Reborn" (2020)

Music video
- A-RA-SHI : Reborn [Official Music Video] on YouTube

"A-ra-shi: Reborn" is a song by Japanese boy band Arashi, released as a single via J Storm on December 20, 2019, as announced on their official social media accounts. The song was later included in the Arashi Reborn Vol.1 extended play, released on February 28, 2020, together with "A Day in Our Life: Reborn", and "One Love: Reborn".

== Background ==
The song was announced in a video shared on the band's official social media, and serves as a thank you to the fans for helping them celebrate their 20th anniversary. The song marks the first part of a new "Reborn" project. "A-ra-shi: Reborn" was uploaded as an audio video to the group's YouTube channel, and was included in download and streaming sites. On its first day, the song managed to reach over one million views in YouTube. It was announced on February 24, 2020, in Arashi's official site at Johnny's, that this song, along with two others, would be included in the "Arashi Reborn Vol. 1" EP released on February 28, 2020 for digital download and streaming.

"A-ra-shi: Reborn" is a new version of the group's debut song "Arashi" with a new arrangement and sound, as well as including more English in its lyrics, which also reflect changes in the group itself, as it opened to an international audience. The original had a funky sound to it, while "Reborn" uses Auto-Tune in its vocals. The rap part has been also changed, with Sho Sakurai writing a new lyric. And the singing has moved from a very group-centered mode to a multi-solo one.

In "Reborn", the lyrics reflect Arashi's ("Hey we are The Storm") rise as a group, reaching close at their goal, while being held there by their fans ("You’re filling me with energy You are the wind..."), as well as making Arashi an individual dream ("A-ra-shi, A-ra-shi, my dream") come true for each of the five members ("five clouds"), whereas in "A-ra-shi", the lyrics reflected the dreams ("A-ra-shi, A-ra-shi, for dream") of the group of teens as a whole ("one cloud") that just started their rise to fame ("Gather the wind in your body and make a storm happen").

== Music video ==
On December 23, a teaser video was uploaded to Arashi's YouTube channel, made in collaboration with the anime One Piece. The 39-second video has the five animated members of the band mingling with the crew from the anime, up until the moment when Arashi is about to give a concert. The full version video was released on January 4, 2020.

== Charts ==
Chart (2019)	Peak position
Japan (Japan Hot 100)	2
Japan (Billboard Japan Hot Buzz Songs)	1 (downloads)
Japan (Oricon Total Weekly Singles)	3
