= If I Was You (OMG) =

Single by Far East Movement featuring Snoop Dogg

from the album Free Wired
- B-side: "Don't Look Now (Fantastadon Remix)"
- Released: March 20, 2011
- Recorded: 2010
- Genre: dance-pop; hip house
- Length: 3:25
- Label: Interscope
- Songwriters: Bruno Mars; Calvin Broadus; Jonathan Yip; Jeremy Reeves; Ray Romulus; James Roh; Kevin Nishimura; Virman Coquia; Jae Choung
- Producers: The Stereotypes; The Smeezingtons

Far East Movement singles chronology
"2gether" (2011)	"If I Was You (OMG)" (2011)	"Jello" (2011)

Snoop Dogg singles chronology
"Boom" (2011)	"If I Was You (OMG)" (2011)	"The Mack" (2011)

Alternative Cover
- EP cover

"If I Was You (OMG)" is a song by Asian-American hip hop group Far East Movement. The song features rapper Snoop Dogg and was produced by the Stereotypes and the Smeezingtons. The original recording appears on the album Free Wired with a total run time of 3:25. It peaked at number 18 on the New Zealand Singles Chart. An official remix was made by Far East Movement and Snoop Dogg called "On Campus Remix".

== Music video ==
The music video for the song premiered on Vevo and YouTube on March 16, 2011. You can also see Natalia Kills, and Dominican model Rosa Acosta as Snoop Dogg's love interest.

== Track listing ==
If I Was You (OMG) EP

1. "If I Was You (OMG)" (Club Remix] (feat. Snoop Dogg) – 3:28
2. "So What?" (Reflip Live at the Cherrytree House) – 4:37
3. "Don't Look Now" (Fantastadon Remix) (feat. Keri Hilson) – 4:03

== Credits and personnel ==
- Lead vocals – Far East Movement & Snoop Dogg
- Producers – Stereotypes, The Smeezingtons
- Lyrics – Bruno Mars, Calvin Broadus, Jonathan Yip, Jeremy Reeves, Ray Romulus, James Roh, Kevin Nishimura, Virman Coquia, Jae Choung
- Label: Interscope Records

== Charts ==
Chart (2011)	Peak position
Australia (ARIA)	63
Belgium (Ultratip Bubbling Under Flanders)	7
New Zealand (Recorded Music NZ)	18

== Release history ==
Release dates and formats for "If I Was You (OMG)"
Region	Date	Format	Label(s)	Ref.
United States	April 12, 2011	Rhythmic airplay	Interscope	
United States	April 19, 2011	Mainstream airplay	Interscope	
