= Please, come to Brazil =

Brazilian internet meme

Please, come to Brazil, often simplified to come to Brazil, is a phrase commonly posted by Brazilians on celebrity pages on social media inviting them to come to the South American country. The frequency with which the phrase is posted and the positive response from some international artists have made it a meme and engendered public and scholarly commentary.

== Origin and spread ==
It is considered that the first "come to Brazil" request was made on 11 April 2008, when a Twitter (currently X) user posted a request for French businessman Loïc Le Meur to come to Brazil. There is also the possibility of the meme having been born on Tumblr, where non-Brazilians started to make fun of the requests, considering them "cringe"; over time, Brazilians re-claimed the phrase to make fun of themselves.

The meme grew in popularity starting in 2009, boosted by the arrival of Canadian singer Justin Bieber on Twitter. Since then, it is commonly posted on celebrity pages on social media, particularly X and Instagram. Even Brazilian celebrities may be asked to come: in a notable instance, singer Anitta answered to a request with the phrase "I'm nele" ("nele" = in it). The phrase is particularly fueled by the LGBTQIA+ community.

The growth in the number of requests coincided with a period of economic growth after which Brazil became a profitable destination for international artists. Starting in 2022, as touring activities resumed following the COVID-19 pandemic, an alternate version of the meme, "stop coming to Brazil", began to circulate to express fans' frustration with the impossibility of affording so many shows. This version was supported by credit analysis body Serasa Experian, which used humor to express concerns with the possible increase in debt from the audience with so many tickets to pay.

== Scholarly and media responses ==
Some journalists and scientists consider the sentence a possible spin-off of the Mongrel complex, in that Brazilians place more value on international artists; however, it would also be an antithesis to it, as the invitation not only reaffirms Brazilian culture and habits but also promotes it to a foreign audience, since Brazil, as part of the Global South, would suffer from invisibility.

Academics also established connections from the phrase with cultural imperialism, particularly from the United States during the Brazilian military dictatorship, which would have instilled in Brazil the idea of the superiority of the American culture; seeing artists from there coming to Brazil and appreciating their experience there would validate the feelings of fans.

The sentence is also demonstrative of the force of the Brazilian fandoms, who make sacrifices to follow the rare and expensive international shows in Brazil. It has also been noted in the press that the phrase carries a literal meaning, without codes or ambiguities: it is, indeed, an invitation to come to Brazil.

== Reactions from artists ==
Some artists explore the meme and the Brazilian fan passion as a whole by creating communications and interactions specifically tailored at the Brazilian audience, such as Bruno Mars and Vincent Martella.

Bands and singers, particularly from the United States, have released songs titled "Come to Brazil", such as drag queen Alaska Thunderfuck, rapper bbno$, and bands Why Don't We, The Offspring, and Alestorm.
