= Nikkan Sports Drama Grand Prix =

- Awarded for: Japanese television dramas
- Country: Japan
- Presented by: Nikkan Sports
- First award: 1997
- Website: Official website

The Nikkan Sports Drama Grand Prix is an award given by the Nikkan Sports newspaper to Japanese television dramas.

The award is determined by viewer votes.

The 14th Nikkan Sports Drama Grand Prix was canceled due to the 2011 Tōhoku earthquake and tsunami.

== Categories ==
- Best Drama
- Best Actor
- Best Actress
- Best Supporting Actor
- Best Supporting Actress
- Best Newcomer

== Winners ==
#	Best Drama	Best Actor	Best Actress	Best Supporting Actor	Best Supporting Actress	Best Newcomer
1st (1997)	Love Generation	Takuya Kimura (Love Generation)	Takako Tokiwa (Saigo no Koi)	Mansai Nomura (Aguri)	Izumi Inamori (Beach Boys)	Hideaki Takizawa (News no Onna)
2nd (1998)	Great Teacher Onizuka	Tsuyoshi Domoto (Ao no Jidai)	Makiko Esumi (Power Office Girls)	Takaya Kamikawa (Omizu no Hanamichi)	Kyoko Fukada (Kamisama, Mō Sukoshi dake)	Tsubasa Imai (Brothers)
3rd (1999)	Beautiful Life	Takuya Kimura (Beautiful Life)	Takako Tokiwa (Beautiful Life)	Takaya Kamikawa (Cinderella wa Nemuranai)	Miki Mizuno (Beautiful Life)	Kazama Shunsuke (Kinpachi-sensei)
4th (2000)	Hero	Takuya Kimura (Hero)	Rie Tomosaka (Kimi ga Oshiete Kureta Koto)	Takaya Kamikawa (Kimi ga Oshiete Kureta Koto)	Mayo Suzukaze (Haregi, Koko Ichiban)	Tomohisa Yamashita (Ikebukuro West Gate Park)
5th (2001)	Antique	Hideaki Takizawa (Antique)	Eri Fukatsu (Koi no Chikara)	Takaya Kamikawa (Shin Omizu no Hanamichi)	Yūki Amami (Suiyōbi no Jōji)	Sho Sakurai (Heaven Cannot Wait 2)
6th (2002)	Good Luck!!	Takuya Kimura (Good Luck!!)	Yūko Takeuchi (The Queen of Lunchtime Cuisine)	Koichi Domoto (Remote)	Akiko Yada (Boku no Ikiru Michi)	Hiroki Uchi (Boku no Ikiru Michi)
7th (2003)	Suna no Utsuwa	Masahiro Nakai (Suna no Utsuwa)	Yūko Takeuchi (Pride)	Takaya Kamikawa (Shiroi Kyotô)	Koyuki (Boku to Kanojo to Kanojo no Ikiru Michi)	Ryo Nishikido (Teruteru Kazoku)
8th (2004)	Yoshitsune	Hideaki Takizawa (Yoshitsune)	Yūki Amami (Rikon Bengoshi)	Kazuya Kamenashi (Gokusen)	Aya Okamoto (Tragedy of "M")	Hikaru Yaotome, Taiyō Ayukawa, Kota Yabu (Kinpachi-sensei)

#	Best Drama	Best Actor	Best Actress	Best Supporting Actor	Best Supporting Actress
9th (2005)	Engine	Tomohisa Yamashita (Nobuta wo Produce)	Yūki Amami (The Queen's Classroom)	Junichi Okada (Tiger & Dragon)	Hiroko Yakushimaru (1 Litre no Namida)
10th (2006)	Hana Yori Dango Returns	Kazunari Ninomiya (Haikei, Chichiue-sama)	Mao Inoue (Hana Yori Dango Returns)	Jun Matsumoto (Hana Yori Dango Returns)	Kyōka Suzuki (Karei-naru Ichizoku)
11th (2007)	Yūkan Club	Jin Akanishi (Yūkan Club)	Maki Horikita (Hanazakari no Kimitachi e)	Toma Ikuta (Hanazakari no Kimitachi e)	Yuu Kashii (Yūkan Club)
12th (2008)	Maō	Satoshi Ohno (Maō)	Aoi Miyazaki (Atsuhime)	Ryo Nishikido (Last Friends)	Juri Ueno (Last Friends)
13th (2009)	The Wallflower	Kazuya Kamenashi (The Wallflower)	Yūki Amami (Boss)	Seiyō Uchino (Jin)	Aya Ōmasa (The Wallflower)
14th (2010)	Cancelled due to the 2011 Tōhoku earthquake and tsunami				
15th (2011)	Yōkai Ningen Bem	Kazuya Kamenashi (Yōkai Ningen Bem)	Nanako Matsushima (I'm Mita, Your Housekeeper.)	Fuku Suzuki (Yōkai Ningen Bem)	Anne Watanabe (Yōkai Ningen Bem)
16th (2012)	Kagi no Kakatta Heya	Satoshi Ohno (Kagi no Kakatta Heya)	Maki Horikita (Doctor Ume)	Kōichi Satō (Kagi no Kakatta Heya)	Erika Toda (Kagi no Kakatta Heya)
17th (2013)	Hanzawa Naoki	Masato Sakai (Hanzawa Naoki)	Rena Nōnen (Amachan)	Kataoka Ainosuke VI (Hanzawa Naoki)	Ko Shibasaki (Ando-Roid)
18th (2014)	Shinigami-kun	Satoshi Ohno (Shinigami-kun)	Haruka Ayase (Kyō wa Kaisha Yasumimasu.)	Atsuro Watabe (War of Money)	Fumino Kimura (War of Money)
19th (2015)	Algernon ni Hanataba o	Tomohisa Yamashita (Algernon ni Hanataba o)	Satomi Ishihara (5→9 From Five to Nine)	Tomohisa Yamashita (5→9 From Five to Nine)	Chiaki Kuriyama (Algernon ni Hanataba o)
20th (2016)	Sekai Ichi Muzukashii Koi	Satoshi Ohno (Sekai Ichi Muzukashii Koi)	Yui Aragaki (The Full-Time Wife Escapist)	Teruyuki Kagawa (99.9)	Eiko Koike (Sekai Ichi Muzukashii Koi)
21st (2017)	99.9 (S2)	Jun Matsumoto (99.9 Season 2)	Satomi Ishihara (Unnatural)	Teruyuki Kagawa (99.9 Season 2)	Fumino Kimura (99.9 Season 2)
22nd (2018)	Ossan's Love	Kei Tanaka (Ossan's Love)	Haruka Ayase (Stepmom and Daughter Blues)	Kento Hayashi (Ossan's Love)	Rio Uchida (Ossan's Love)
23rd (2019)	In Hand	Kei Tanaka (Your Turn to Kill, Ossan's Love in the Sky)	Erika Toda (Scarlet)	Gaku Hamada (In Hand)	Nanao (In Hand)
24th (2020)	Hanzawa Naoki (S2)	Hiroki Hasegawa (Awaiting Kirin)	Haruka Ayase (Heaven and Hell: Soul Exchange)	Shōta Sometani (Awaiting Kirin)	Fumi Nikaido (Yell)
25th (2021)	The Men of the Wada Family	Masaki Aiba (The Men of the Wada Family)	Haru (Night Doctor and Dear My Loneliness and Darkness)	Yuta Kishi (Night Doctor)	Aju Makita (Welcome Home, Monet)
26th (2022)	The Black Swindler	Sho Hirano (The Black Swindler)	Sakura Ando (Rebooting)	Tomokazu Miura (The Black Swindler)	Yuina Kuroshima (The Black Swindler)
27th (2023)	Marriage Hunter	Shunsuke Michieda (Mars)	Nao (Even If You Don't Do It)	Yūsei Yagi (Marriage Hunter and others)	Ai Yoshikawa (Mars and Cinderella of Midsummer)
28th (2024)	Superstar Minami Is My Boyfriend!?	Tomohisa Yamashita (Blue Moment)	Sairi Ito (The Tiger and Her Wings)	Yūsei Yagi (Superstar Minami Is My Boyfriend!?)	Yūki Amami (Believe: A Bridge to You)
29th (2025)	Reboot	Ryohei Suzuki (Reboot)	Kyoko Yoshine (A Calm Sea and Beautiful Days with You)	Ren Nagase (Reboot)	Erika Toda (Reboot)

== See also ==
- List of Asian television awards
