= Saigo no Yakusoku =

- 最後の約束
- Genre: Human suspense
- Written by: Shigeki Kaneko
- Directed by: Yuichi Satō
- Starring: Satoshi Ohno; Sho Sakurai; Masaki Aiba; Kazunari Ninomiya; Jun Matsumoto; Meisa Kuroki
- Theme music composer: Arashi; Akio Izutsu
- Country of origin: Japan
- Original language: Japanese

Production
- Producer: Reiko Nagai

Original release
- Network: Fuji Television
- Release: January 9, 2010

Saigo no Yakusoku (最後の約束; lit. The Last Promise) is a Japanese drama special starring the members of Japanese boy band Arashi in their first drama together in nearly ten years.

== Synopsis ==
On January 9, 2010, people inside a huge building at the headquarters of the large company "Enebio" were taken hostage. The criminals threaten to blow up the building if the president, Niimi, does not hand over a ransom of 300 million yen within 90 minutes. At the same time, five men with different occupations happened to be in the building... How are they related to the case?

== Story ==
Info

Janitors Satoru Mashiko (Satoshi Ohno) and Haruo Iio (Kazuki Kosakai) are driving towards Energy Bio Corporation for work when motorcycle courier Nozomu Gotō (Jun Matsumoto) passes by them. Gotō goes to deliver a package to Yuriko Niimi (Meisa Kuroki), the daughter of the president of Energy Bio Corporation. Meanwhile, Fuyuko Todoroki (Nene Otsuka) orders a cappuccino from coffee shop employee Akira Tanada (Masaki Aiba). They talk before she has to leave to meet with insurance salesman Yukio Tomizawa (Sho Sakurai) downstairs. As Mashiko and Iio start cleaning, Tanada apologizes for giving security center employee Shūji Yamagiwa (Kazunari Ninomiya) and new security manager Shinichirō Okanaka (Naohito Fujiki) the wrong order.

At 3:00pm, a disguised man with a rifle informs everyone that he and his allies have hijacked the building and set up a bomb that will go off in ninety minutes should President Niimi (Masahiko Tsugawa) not arrive with the ransom. Before she is locked in with Tomizawa, Fuyuko and the rest of the hostages in the fifth floor lobby, Yuriko runs off with Gotō running after her. At the police station, Niimi and chief detective Genji Morozumi (Yukiya Kitamura) keep in contact with a hiding Tanada.

Meanwhile, Yuriko quickly collects company data worth more than the ransom money. She reveals how she believes her father will only come to save his company. In turn, Gotō reveals his own past of how his trusted friend died ten years ago. They cut off the power, which allows most of the hostages to escape the lobby. Okanaka distracts the hijackers to give Yamagiwa the chance to open the B-1 doors on the second floor for the hostages to escape the building after the power returns. Tanada informs the police that the basement doors are open, and Mashiko chooses not escape with Iio.

After the escaped hostages manage to get outside, Gotō tells Yuriko to go while he tries to take down the hijacker chasing after them. The doors close in front of Yuriko, who stops when she hears a gunshot and sees Gotō collapse; the hijackers take her away. Meanwhile, as the only two still trapped in the lobby, Fuyuko reveals to Tomizawa that her father died taking a drug handled by Niimi's company just before she is taken away as well. After administrating a background check, Morozumi finds out that the phone number Tanada has been using belongs to a young man who died ten years ago.

The hijackers take Niimi, who went in the building with the money, to the security room, where Yamagiwa, Okanaka, Yuriko and Fuyuko are tied up. One of the four hijackers in the room informs Niimi that all they want is for him to publicly admit that his company handled lethal medicine that killed their friend and Fuyuko's father. The hijackers reveal themselves to be Mashiko, Tomizawa, Tanada and Gotō. Okanaka knew that there were only a total five hijackers, with Yamagiwa being the fifth one who oversaw the operation.

Although Niimi initially refused to admit that he distributed the drug while knowing the risks, he relents and Yuriko decides to stay by her father's side. Niimi apologizes to her and then confesses to the media. After Okanaka agrees to erase the security data of their kōhai, who helped the five before the switch during the hostages' escape, the five escape through the air vents and into the basement. However, Mashiko realizes that he does not have the car key, only to find that Iio had left it on the car for him. At a distance from the building, the timer reaches zero and the bomb turns out to be an explosive for fireworks instead. Finally able to move forward, Mashiko, Tomizawa, Tanada, Yamagiwa and Gotō readily surrender themselves to the police.

== Cast ==
Cast info.

- Satoshi Ohno as Satoru Mashiko (28), an employee of the cleaning company Time Cleaning.
- Sho Sakurai as Yukio Tomizawa (28), a life insurance salesman who works for Ronnie Life Insurance.
- Masaki Aiba as Akira Tanada (28), an employee of Cameo Coffee, a coffee shop inside Energy Bio Corporation.
- Kazunari Ninomiya as Shūji Yamagiwa (27), a temporary employee of Energy Bio Corporation's security center.
- Jun Matsumoto as Nozomu Gotō (27), a motorcycle courier.
- Meisa Kuroki as Yuriko Nīmi, the daughter of the president of Energy Bio Corporation.
- Yukiya Kitamura as Genji Morozumi, the chief detective of the building hijack case.
- Kazuki Kosakai as Haruo Īo, a new employee of Time Cleaning.
- Masahiko Tsugawa as Tomohiko Nīmi, the president of Energy Bio Corporation.

=== Guests ===
- Naohito Fujiki as Shinichirō Okanaka, the director of Energy Bio Corporation's security center,
- Nene Otsuka as Fuyuko Todoroki, an employee of Energy Bio Corporation.

Other cast members included Yasuhi Nakamura, Kisuke Īda, Shinji Rokkaku, Takeshi Ōbayashi, and Sayaka Morimoto.

== Production ==
Fuji Television announced on November 11, 2009, that all the members of Arashi would co-star in Saigo no Yakusoku.

=== Filming ===
On the 14th day of filming, all five members began filming together. On the 16th day of filming, Ohno and Kitamura filmed the air duct and lift scenes. On the 21st day of filming, it was the last day of filming after two months. According to director Yuichi Satō (佐藤 祐市, Satō Yuichi) and Arashi member Jun Matsumoto, filming ended by the end of 2009.

=== Music ===
It was announced on that Arashi themselves would provide the theme song "Sora Takaku" (空高く; lit. "Sky High") for the drama special. On January 7, 2010, a preview of the song was first aired on Mezamashi TV during an interview with Arashi.

== Release ==
=== Promotion ===
From December 28, 2009, to January 3, 2010, posters depicting Arashi with black tape over their mouths were wrapped around the pillars of Omotesandō Station. As a shocking promotional tactic, real ropes were wrapped around the pillars, making it look like the members were bound and gagged.

On January 5, 2010, Arashi appeared at the Fuji Television headquarters in Odaiba with a lighting ceremony to celebrate the then-upcoming drama special. The headquarters were lit with green, purple, yellow, blue and red to encapsulate the representative colors of Aiba, Matsumoto, Ninomiya, Ohno and Sakurai respectively.

=== Reception ===
The special received a viewership rating of 19.4% in the Kantō region.

=== DVD ===
Released on June 2, 2010, the DVD sold 162,000 copies in its first week, making it both the first drama-related product to have sold over 100,000 copies in the first week and the drama DVD with the highest first week sales recorded in Oricon drama DVD history.
