= Pui Pui Molcar =

Japanese anime television series

- Cover for the official DVD box set released by Bandai Visual

PUI PUI モルカー (Pui Pui Morukā)
- Anime television series
- Directed by: Tomoki Misato (season 1); Hana Ono (season 2)
- Produced by: Ikumi Hayashi
- Written by: Tomoki Misato
- Music by: Shota Kowashi
- Studio: Shin-Ei Animation; Japan Green Hearts (season 1); UchuPeople (season 2)
- Licensed by: NA: Netflix; SA/SEA: Muse Communication
- Original network: TXN (TV Tokyo, TV Osaka)
- Original run: January 5, 2021 – December 24, 2022
- Episodes: 24
- Anime film

Tobidase! Narase! Pui Pui Molcar
- Directed by: Tomoki Misato
- Written by: Tomoki Misato
- Music by: Shota Kowashi
- Studio: Shin-Ei Animation, Japan Green Hearts
- Released: July 22, 2021
- Runtime: 34 minutes
- Anime film

Pui Pui Molcar The Movie MOLMAX
- Directed by: Mankyū
- Written by: Yuuko Kakihara
- Music by: Shota Kowashi
- Studio: Monster's Egg
- Released: November 29, 2024
- Runtime: 69 minutes

Pui Pui Molcar (Japanese: PUI PUI モルカー, Hepburn: Pui Pui Morukā; "Pui Pui Cavy-Car") is a Japanese stop-motion short anime series produced by Shin-Ei Animation and Japan Green Hearts in cooperation with Bandai Namco Entertainment. The series is directed and written by Tomoki Misato, with Misato and the staff in Japan Green Hearts designing the characters and models and Shota Kowatsu composing the music. It aired in Japan on TV Tokyo through its Kinder TV children's variety program on January 5, 2021. The series' title is a play on the words marmot (モルモット, morumotto; the Japanese word for guinea pig) and car, which reflects the main characters. Upon its release, it was received positively by fans and critics due to its simple storyline in each episode.

A second season titled Pui Pui Molcar Driving School (Japanese: PUI PUI モルカー DRIVING SCHOOL, Hepburn: Pui Pui Morukā DRIVING SCHOOL; "Pui Pui Cavy-Car DRIVING SCHOOL") aired between October and December 2022.

A 3DCG film was set to premiere in Japanese theatres in 2024.

== Series setting ==
The series is aired as a two-minute-plus short animation segment on the children's variety program Kinder TV. Each short focuses on a world where people drive sentient vehicles that are hybrids between guinea pigs and motor vehicles. Though each episode's story varies, the core focus of the series focuses on the Molcars' antics and sometimes a bit of solving problems for their friends and their drivers. Episodes sometimes include parodies of famous movie genres for comedic effect.

=== Characters ===
There are five named Molcars in the series as profiled in the show's website:

Potato (ポテト, Poteto)
A male beige Molcar with orange patches. He is shown to be laid back but also ready to help anyone in need, something that is proven by helping out an ambulance Molcar weave through a traffic jam. Shown to like carrots.
Shiromo (シロモ, Shiromo)
A male white Molcar with a cowardly personality who easily gets into trouble. He yearns for Teddy "like an older sister", but his bad luck always leads him to trouble, from being hijacked to becoming a Zombie Molcar. Shown to like lettuce.
Abbey (アビー, Abī)
An off-white male Molcar with a spiky top and beginner's marks on the sides. He has a fear of cats which he had overcome with help from his friends. He also is profiled to be serious, curious, and extremely proud.
Choco (チョコ, Choko)
A female chocolate brown Molcar with flowers on her ears/side mirrors. Although profiled to be as somewhat of a fashionista, she is also shown to be strong and fit.
Teddy (テディ, Tedī)
A female dark brown Molcar who is known to eat anything, including garbage. Profiled as a tomboy, she has also showed a fearless personality, being able to face the zombie horde with weapons in and teaming up with Choco on a rescue mission.

The second season, Pui Pui Molcar Driving School, adds newer lead characters:

Rose (ローズ, Rōzu)
A white Molcar with red patches who is profiled as one who cares about fashion. Her actions with Abbey causes her and the others to be sent back to driving school. Previously a minor character in the first season.
Peter (ペーター, Pētā)
A light gray rookie Molcar currently enrolled at driving school.
Thumb (ひー, Hī), Shoe (ふー, Fū), and Knee (みー, Mī)
Molcars working for the driving school.

Aside from the named Molcars mentioned above, there are also several other unnamed Molcars distinguished by their colors as well as main uses, with some Molcars functioning as ambulances, police patrol cars, and food stands. These unnamed Molcars are being retroactively given names and monikers through a series of Twitter posts as part of a countdown to the compilation movie's release. The show also depicts human and non-human characters, mostly depicted as faceless figurines, although in several episodes, interior shots are shown as limited live-action scenes where drivers and passengers are played by actors; the first episode alone sees portrayals by director Tomoki Misato and older sister Mizuho, herself an actress. The 10th episode introduces the fictional magical girl anime Magica Morumi (魔法天使もるみ, Mahō Tenshi Morumi; lit. 'Magical Angel Morumi').

== Development ==
Tomoki Misato is a stop motion animator and director born in Tokyo, Japan and graduated from Musashino Art University in 2016. Though he made short films, he became famous in the animation industry when he directed the award-winning short My Little Goat in 2018, which he produced over a ten-year period. It was praised by critics for both its animation and story.

As an upcoming director, he began working with Pui Pui Molcar after being approached by Noboru Sugiyama, the executive producer at Shin-Ei Animation in an offer with Bandai Namco Entertainment to produce a short animation series that would air as one of the segments in Kinder TV. His original plan was to create a 30-minute short film but decided to create an omnibus short series instead. According to Misato himself, the series' quirky design and animation as well as its premise came from an idea back in 2019. He recalled that "if the car were a cute guinea pig, will the frustrating events that occur while driving be solved?" He also added, "To act on a society that is easily swept away by people, I also want to convey the fun and importance of it." Almost all of the episodes of the series was directed and written by Misato himself, though he was assisted by an animation crew composed of four people at Japan Green Hearts alongside Hana Ono and many others. He did point out that "[he] was worried about how would the story turn out in each episode in a fixed length of 2 minutes and 40 seconds". Sugiyama also said "Unlike live-action films, there are no coincidences in the world of Pui Pui Molcar. When Director Misato creates a set, everything is arranged in a particular way for a purpose."

The series took a year and a half to produce. Majority of the characters in the series were made using cotton and wool, with some of the effects done using both cotton yarn and some flashlights. In addition, pixilation and time-lapse photography were also used in the series to include live-action actors inside the Molcars in some episodes, as well as recordings of real guinea pig squeaks for the Molcars' voices. The series also incorporates elements of traditional 2D animation in the form of snippets.

== Media ==
=== Anime ===
Pui Pui Molcar aired in TV Tokyo as one of the segments in the Children's Variety Program Kinder TV on January 5, 2021. Each two-minute episode is aired at 7:30 AM. A second season aired on TV Tokyo from October 8 to December 24, 2022, with Hana Ono directing the series and UchuPeople taking over as main animation studio from Japan Green Hearts. Bandai Namco Entertainment streams the show officially in YouTube for free. Muse Communication licensed the series outside Japan to be aired also in YouTube in South and Southeast Asian territories. Netflix is streaming the series in North America and other select territories excluding some parts of Asia starting March 25, 2021.

Bandai Namco Arts, under the Bandai Visual label, released the first season of the series in both DVD and Blu-ray box sets on July 28, 2021.

==== Season 1 (2021) ====
No. overall	No. in season	Title	Original release date
1	1	"Who Caused the Traffic Jam?"; Transliteration: "Jūtai wa dare no sei?" (Japanese: 渋滞は誰のせい？)	January 5, 2021
At an elevated highway, Potato arrives at the back of a long traffic jam, making his driver, a female office worker (Mizuho Misato in the live action scenes), worried about coming to work on time. The cause of the congestion is revealed to be a headphones-wearing, speaker-mounted purple DJ Molcar listening to music and its equally distracted driver (Tomoki Misato) watching guinea pig videos on his cellphone. Back at the tail end of the jam, an ambulance Molcar comes behind Potato, its extreme anxiety being caused by its main passenger, a woman in critical condition with her male companion at her side. With the nearest hospital sighted a distance away and no other way off the elevated highway, Potato lifts the ambulance Molcar and makes it shimmy over the other Molcars in front. Seeing no harm being done, Potato does the same and soon every other Molcar follows suit, to the delight of Potato's driver. The shimmying Molcars eventually reach the head of the line, dislodging the headphones off the DJ Molcar and overwhelming it. The DJ Molcar then escapes the scene, leaving its driver to be arrested by police, while Potato and the other previously stranded Molcars head off to their respective destinations.
2	2	"Catch the Bank Robber!"; Transliteration: "Ginkō gōtō o tsukamaero!" (Japanese: 銀行強盗をつかまえろ！)	January 12, 2021
Shiromo is parked in front of a store, being fed lettuce to keep him preoccupied. Meanwhile, a bank next to the store is robbed by three men, but with police already en route, the trio Molcar-jack Shiromo to use as their getaway vehicle. The robbers hold off the police Molcars with carrots. Unknown to them, Shiromo starts to whittle away at their loot, leaving behind a literal money trail. As a result, police locate the robbers' hideout, arrest the trio, and award Shiromo with a medal for his actions. Shiromo is then escorted back to his original spot at the store, where his original driver is waiting to take themselves home.
3	3	"Cat Rescuing Operation"; Transliteration: "Neko kyūshutsu dai sakusen" (Japanese: ネコ救出大作戦)	January 19, 2021
Abbey is parked at a restaurant during a hot summer's day when he and the other Molcars in the parking lot hear meows. Abbey and eventually the others discover to their horror that the meows come from inside Abbey—his female driver apparently left behind her pet cat. Fear however becomes concern as the Molcars observe the cat starting to feel the effects of being in a hot Molcar. Being in the shade, however, proves too slow for the cat's relief. The Molcars then notice the ice cream inside the restaurant (and by extension the restaurant's air conditioning) and proceed to barge into the restaurant to search for something cool; they succeed in cooling the cat but at the expense of ruining the restaurant.
4	4	"Chewing Chewing Cleaning"; Transliteration: "Mushamusha osōji" (Japanese: むしゃむしゃおそうじ)	January 26, 2021
Teddy's male driver is surprised to learn that his Molcar is capable of eating the snack bags that he has just thrown away. As a result, the man eats more of his junk food and throws the bag to be eaten by Teddy. Eventually, however, Teddy reaches her limit and all the garbage she has eaten ends up in the driver's compartment, overwhelming her driver. Sensing she is actually not yet done, she goes to the nearest toilet lot and ejects more garbage and even her driver to their shock.
5	5	"PUI PUI Racing"; Transliteration: "Pui pui rēshingu" (Japanese: プイプイレーシング)	February 2, 2021
Potato, Shiromo, Abbey, Choco, and Teddy compete in a race with Abbey equipped with rocket boosters with the intention to be ahead of the competition. As soon as the race starts, Abbey's rockets malfunction, causing him to be left behind at the starting line. The others run the course filled with various obstacles such as ramps leading to pools and other construction obstacles. Along the way, Teddy eats a carrot that boosts her speed, but she goes so fast, she veers off course and hits a wall. Back at the starting line, Abbey's rockets finally fire, raising him and his driver off the ground and detaching themselves from Abbey, bringing both Molcar and driver back to earth. The rogue rockets fly across the city and one hits several boxes filled with carrots, spilling them unto the road. This causes the other competing Molcars to have a free meal just short of the finish line. Abbey catches up with the others and tries to have the last carrot, but is beaten to it by Choco. Distraught for not being able to partake on a carrot, Abbey sadly plods away from the group and unwittingly crosses the finish line, only realizing his come-from-behind win through the cheering crowd. Abbey's prize is a trophy full of vegetables which he shares with his fellow competitors.
6	6	"Zombies and Lunch"; Transliteration: "Zonbi to ranchi" (Japanese: ゾンビとランチ)	February 9, 2021
During a zombie apocalypse, Shiromo and Teddy are chased through the desert by a zombie horde. The Molcar duo find a garage to hide into and locate a spiked snowplow and a minigun which Teddy uses against the zombies. Elsewhere, a Burger Molcar trods through the desert. The chase that ensues between Teddy, Shiromo, and the zombie horde reaches and goes around the Burger Molcar, causing it to become dizzy and dislodge the large hamburger on its back. Teddy, Shiromo, and the zombies are about to fight over the giant hamburger, which happens to be edible, but the Burger Molcar blows a whistle to calm everyone down and pick what they want to eat. Shiromo takes the lettuce, Teddy the tomato slice, and the zombies the beef patty, leaving the bun to the birds. As everyone noshes, one zombie accidentally bites Shiromo, turning him into a zombie Molcar. Witnessing the transformation, Teddy and the Burger Molcar run away out of fear. Seemingly not aware what has happened to him, Shiromo then takes the beef patty away from the other zombies and goes after Teddy and the Burger Molcar, thus resuming the chase.
7	7	"It's a Prank? It's Sparkling Clean!"; Transliteration: "Dokkiri? Sukkiri!" (Japanese: どっきり？スッキリ！)	February 16, 2021
A long-haired Treasure Molcar (styled after Indiana Jones) embarks on a journey through deserts and jungles to retrieve a golden carrot from inside an ancient temple. Upon his return to civilization, however, the first group he meets—composed of Potato, Choco, and Tenten (a white-with-dark-gray-patches Molcar)—is terrified of him because of his muddied and fly-infested appearance. The group tries twice to get the Treasure Molcar into a Molcar wash, but both times, the Treasure Molcar refuses to enter, overwhelmed by the machinery inside. The group then espies the Treasure Molcar's map to the original golden carrot, giving Choco an idea. A plain carrot is spray-painted gold and placed inside the Molcar wash while with the help of the Molcar wash operator, a new map is drawn directing the Treasure Molcar to go through the Molcar wash to retrieve the imitation golden carrot. The ruse works; the fake golden carrot in the Molcar wash reminds the Treasure Molcar of the original one he retrieved and makes him unwittingly undergo the cleaning process. As a result, the Treasure Molcar emerges from the Molcar wash cleaner and with a lighter brown coat. Apparently having fun from the cleaning process, he then makes several passes through the Molcar wash and eventually lightens its coat further into a blond color with a sheen so bright sunglasses are required just to look at him.
8	8	"Mol Mission"; Transliteration: "Morumisshon" (Japanese: モルミッション)	February 23, 2021
The now-blonde Treasure Molcar from the previous episode has been kidnapped by a crime organization in hopes of getting a ransom. A rescue mission is launched with Choco and Teddy being brought in by way of a helicopter and infiltrating the crime gang's skyscraper headquarters through air ducts. Choco and Teddy manage to rescue the Treasure Molcar, but the crime organization unleashes its weapon, a flying mechanical shark which destroys the Molcars' helicopter. The flying shark then chases the Molcar group through the city, firing desctrutive lasers at them. The shark disappears then emerges from underground to try to eat Teddy, but the latter ejects an explosive which finally finishes the shark into a hunk of metal. Amongst the resulting debris, Teddy then uses the shark's dorsal fin to eke out a scare from her companions.
9	9	"Everything is a Surprise"; Transliteration: "Subette sapuraizu" (Japanese: すべってサプライズ)	March 3, 2021
During a winter's day at an intersection, the Molcars are having difficulties traversing the ice-covered roads. Abbey and Potato meet up with each other when they espy on a man practicing for his surprise marriage proposal before quickly hiding the engagement ring from his girlfriend. Elsewhere, a patrol Molcar loses some traction on the icy road and tries to pick itself up in a dance-like movement. This inspires the passing DJ Molcar to provide music. As a result, the Molcars at the intersection do several impromptu dance numbers, providing entertainment for passersby. Some Molcars accidentally turn themselves into snowballs, forcing the couple from earlier into the intersection amongst the Molcars. The couple then do a performance of their own and the man uses the opportunity for his marriage proposal. The girlfriend accepts and the couple get married on the spot. After the newlywed couple leave the scene on a wedding Molcar, the other Molcars slowly return to their respective engagements with the patrol Molcar continuing its dance before belatedly realizing the music has stopped.
10	10	"I want to Be a Hero"; Transliteration: "Hīrō ni naritai" (Japanese: ヒーローになりたい)	March 9, 2021
Abbey trains himself hard so he can be like the caped costumed superheroes of Western pop culture. His driver, an apparent anime otaku, has other ideas, however. After being bathed, Abbey is dyed pink, festooned in glitter, and plastered with decals bearing images of the magical girl Morumi. Abbey finds his new appearance embarrassing and after taking his driver to an anime specialty cafe, he interprets the stares from passersby, both human and Molcar alike, as poking fun at his appearance, exacerbating his embarrassment and forcing himself into a nearby alley to hide. A commotion then occurs when a cat is spotted high up a tree and perched on a branch that is about to break. Unknown to Abbey and his driver, the decal on his left side is Morumi herself and sensing his desire to help the cat, she lends him her powers in the form of a tiara and a pair of angel wings, enabling him to rescue the falling cat and take it to safety. As a result, Abbey gets to live out being a superhero and the associated admiration from everyone, albeit not in the way he originally wants it to be.
11	11	"Time Molcar"; Transliteration: "Taimu Morukā" (Japanese: タイムモルカー)	March 16, 2021
A Time Molcar (styled after the DeLorean from the Back to the Future movie franchise) arrives at a prehistoric ice age with its passengers, its mad scientist inventor and his young female companion, to know the ways of prehistoric man and the associated theory of evolution. Their arrival, however, extinguishes a large bonfire, earning the ire of the tribesmen that set it. The tribesmen chase and eventually corner the time traveling group to a steep rock formation, but the former group is scared off by the appearance of a large (live action) guinea pig, a possible ancestor to all Molcars. The time travel group thank the giant guinea pig and are about to leave when a snowstorm hits. Not wanting to leave the guinea pig out in the cold, the mad scientist and the girl have it wear a large striped sweater for it to wear. This random act of kindness, however, unwittingly alters the past as upon the time traveling group's return to the present time, every Molcar they encounter is clad in a sweater similar to the one they gave to the prehistoric guinea pig. This episode features Tsumugi, Mizuho Misato's pet guinea pig, whose squeaks were also used as "voices" for all Molcars in the series.
12	12	"Let's! Molcar Party!"; Transliteration: "Let's! Morukā pātī!" (Japanese: Let's！モルカーパーティー！)	March 23, 2021
Potato and his driver arrive home at night with his driver, exhausted from work, dozing off behind the wheel. He takes her inside their home and tucks her into the living room sofa. Her smartphone slides out from inside her person and he uses a chat app installed in it to tell the other Molcars that he is going to throw a party. What happens next is a virtual gathering of many Molcars featured in the series, all trying to have fun after a long day. At one point, the Molcars' shenanigans cause Potato's driver to briefly awaken, only for her to go back to sleep upon seeing nothing superficially unusual. The party then resumes overnight. The next morning, Potato's driver wakes up to find herself surrounded by Molcars sleeping inside her living room, while her equally exhausted Molcar is snoozing in her bedroom. This episode is the only one outside of the initial episodes in this season to feature a live action human actor, with actress Mizuho Misato reprising her role from the first episode.

==== Season 2 (2022) ====
No. overall	No. in season	Title	Original release date
13	1	"The Buildings are Falling Down!"; Transliteration: "Biru taoshichatta!" (Japanese: ビル倒しちゃった！)	October 8, 2022
Potato and his driver (Mizuho Misato again reprising her role in the interior scenes) have just disposed a soda can into a nearby trash bin as nearby, Abbey is being loaded with new rockets by his otaku driver. Rose, a beige Molcar with red patches and hoop earrings, passes Abbey and remembers him from his cat rescue in episode 10 of the first season. A chase between Abbey and Rose ensues, causing the former to step onto another soda can on the street, slip, and have his new rockets dislodge and ignite. Teddy catches one of the rockets, but nudges a nearby building housing a jewelry store, toppling it and several others in the process. Potato, Abbey, Rose, and Teddy, as well as Choco, who takes off with several items from the jewelry store shortly before the incident, and unlucky passerby Shiromo who happens to join the group, are brought to court along with their drivers. At court, the judge revokes the Molcars' licenses and sends the Molcars back to Driving School at a mountaintop outside the city.
14	2	"White-Painted Molcar's Counterattack"; Transliteration: "Shironuri Morukā no gyakushū" (Japanese: 白塗りモラカーの逆襲)	October 15, 2022
Potato and his friends arrive at Driving School and initially had fun at the playground, even eating carrots that are not supposed to be consumed. They are then met by Driving School staff consisting of Molcars Thumb, Shoe, and Knee, a military-style drill instructor, and his secretary. The drill instructor seethes at the new arrivals' shenanigans and backs them to another part of Driving School. There, he shows how proper Molcars should look like, standing erect with no decorations and in "proper form." To enforce this, Choco is deprived of her hair flowers (making Rose fear for her earrings) and the student Molcars are repainted mostly white with standard decals, student caps, and student license plates that read "RETAKE MOLCAR," all to the surprise of their arriving drivers. The drill instructor then gets inside Potato to check on the latter's interior, but Potato unconsciously tosses him around and ejects him through the back end. The drill instructor is then given a cold stare by all Molcars, even Thumb, Shoe, and Knee. Seeing his plan for assimilation backfiring, the drill instructor undoes his changes to the student Molcars and even has Choco's hair flowers returned to her.
15	3	"Honest Eating"; Transliteration: "Shokuyoku wa shōjiki" (Japanese: 食欲は正直)	October 21, 2022
New student Peter meets up with the other student Molcars. The drill instructor then shows various signs to look out for. Seeing Shiromo missing (he has gone to the toilet), the drill instructor then flashes various scenes from the first season which he alleges are violations the students have made, including Shiromo being used as a robbers' getaway vehicle in episode 2, distressing Shiromo's driver. Shiromo returns from his toilet trip when the lunch bell rings. The drill instructor tries to feed the Molcars soup which they do not find tasty but Peter and Teddy eat nonetheless. Shiromo's driver does not immediately leave to join the other drivers, instead feeding the latter a lettuce leaf first for his meal. Upon leaving, the driver is confronted by other Molcars, forcing him to give up his stash of lettuce leaves which the Molcars happily gorged upon. This and the fact the Molcars' soup bowls are mostly left untouched earn the drill instructor's further ire and thus more trouble for the Molcars.
16	4	"Glitchy Rescue"; Transliteration: "Bagu-tte resukyū" (Japanese: バグってレスキュー)	October 29, 2022
Rose and Potato watch on as Abbey, along with Peter, does some simulated driving using VR booths as part of their retraining in Driving School. To pass the time, Abbey's otaku driver plays a dating sim featuring the magical girl Morumi on his handheld game console, standing next to the orange cables connecting the VR booths to the main server computer. Potato sees the cables and eats part of one cable's insulation coating due to the color reminding him of carrots. The sparks from the cable's now exposed live wire startles the otaku into dropping his console and Morumi disappears from the game in the process. Meanwhile, Potato's appetite has also caused a bug in Abbey and Peter's driving test, morphing the virtual city into a post-apocalyptic one being invaded by a dinosaur. Seeing a virtual cat in danger, Abbey and Peter make their first moves to save it. Morumi then appears and once again lends her powers to the duo (identical to the events on episode 10 of the first season), enabling them to save the cat. Morumi returns to the dating sim game afterwards while Peter and Abbey emerge from the VR booths now wearing tiaras and wings.
17	5	"Love Letter from the Bum"; Transliteration: "Rabu retā wa oshiri kara" (Japanese: ラブレターはお尻から)	November 5, 2022
18	6	"Grasp the Victory! Munch Munch Athletic Meet"; Transliteration: "Shōri o nigire! Mogumogu daiundōkai" (Japanese: 勝利を握れ！もぐもぐ大運動会)	November 12, 2022
19	7	"Scary Undersea Tunnel"; Transliteration: "Kyōfu no kaitei tonneru" (Japanese: 恐怖の海底トンネル)	November 19, 2022
20	8	"Useless Us"; Transliteration: "Damedame na bokura" (Japanese: ダメダメなぼくら)	November 26, 2022
21	9	"Exciting! Lunar Training"; Transliteration: "Doki doki! Getsumen kyōshū" (Japanese: ドキドキ！月面教習)	December 3, 2022
22	10	"Who is that Girl?"; Transliteration: "Ano ko wa daare?" (Japanese: あの子はだぁれ？)	December 10, 2022
23	11	"Peter's Nightmare"; Transliteration: "Pētā no akumu" (Japanese: ペーターの悪夢)	December 17, 2022
24	12	"Goodbye! Driving School"; Transliteration: "Gubbai! Doraibingusukūru" (Japanese: グッバイ！ドライビングスクール)	December 24, 2022

=== Film ===
A Season 1 compilation film titled Tobidase! Narase! Pui Pui Molcar (Japanese: とびだせ！ならせ！ PUI PUI モルカー, Hepburn: Tobidase! Narase! PUI PUI Morukā; "Jump out! Break in! Pui Pui Cavy-Car") was released in theaters on July 22, 2021. The compilation movie was dedicated to Koji Tsujitani (1962–2018) in the end credits.

A 3DCG film titled Pui Pui Molcar The Movie MOLMAX (Japanese: PUI PUI モルカー ザ・ムービー MOLMAX, Hepburn: PUI PUI Morukā Za Mūbī MOLMAX) was announced on January 23, 2024. The film is directed by Mankyū, with Tomoki Misato credited with chief supervision, and Yuuko Kakihara writing the script. The film is set to premiere the same year. On August 5, 2024, it was revealed that the movie's release would be on November 29, 2024, and that it would include voice acting from Arashi's Masaki Aiba, and Akio Otsuka, who will play human characters in the Molcar's world. The trailer for the movie was released on September 30, 2024.

=== Merchandise ===
Several merchandise tied to the series were released, with Eikoh announced the characters of the series will be released as part of the Mochikororin Plush Mascot line of mini plush toys on February 5, 2021. Good Smile Company released a Nendoroid figure of Potato first announced on Wonder Hobby 33 in April 2022, that has compatibility with certain recently released Nendoroid figures. The show has also announced a collaboration with Bandai Namco Filmworks to promote the release of Mobile Suit Gundam: The Witch from Mercury, accompanied with an artwork by JNTHED.

A virtual pet collaboration with Bandai's Tamagotchi, the "Pui Pui Molcartchi", was released in October 2021.

=== Video game ===
A party game titled Pui Pui Molcar: Let's Molcar Party was released by Bandai Namco Entertainment in December 2021 for the Nintendo Switch.

== Reception ==
Upon the series' release, it was received positively by both fans and critics in Japan. Naoki Ogi, an educational critic, stated, "Reading the story from music, movements, and facial expressions in an anime without dialogue stimulates the imagination of children. The message is not explained in words, but is good from an educational point of view." She also added, "The current COVID-19 pandemic may actually influence the series' rise in its popularity." Hakusai Kobayashi of Famitsu also praised the show for its animation and simple storyline saying "It has a high degree of perfection as an animation work. I'm guessing that's the reason the show has become popular." Kodansha's Japanese automotive magazine Best Car has featured the series in a three-page article.

Reception outside Japan is just as positive. Kara Dennison of Otaku USA magazine stated, "Pui Pui Molcar doesn't involve any dialogue (at least so far): just squeaks. And what makes it accessible for little kids also makes it accessible for international viewers." Leandre Grecia of Top Gear Philippines found Pui Pui Molcar enjoyable even for older viewers, saying it is "a feel-good no-dialogue series containing sub-three-minute episodes, and we dare say the entire show has a decent mix of comedy, drama, and action." Grecia also added that the show teaches children "some subtle lessons on social responsibility, which can help give kids an idea or two on how to act properly toward other people and animals, and the environment."

Alicia Haddick of Otaquest mentioned that among the reasons for the series' popularity in and out of Japan are the simplistic design and inviting setting along with the Molcar concept, commenting that "Turning [cars] into the equivalent of pets and having them act as such is also an ingenious move that only endears them to the audience." Haddick added that the simple designs have caused the show to spawn fan art easily shared in social media and provide "a blank slate to personalize with self-made designs that fit into the basic idea of a Molcar. ... All the while, as plentiful YouTube videos show, it's easy to make a Molcar of your own."

The series also became a trending topic in Twitter in the month of January prior to its first airing. Japanese media review company Filmarks ranked the series first place of the most popular anime in the 2021 winter anime season, beating other popular series like SK8 the Infinity, Non Non Biyori Nonstop and World Trigger.
