= Mou Yuukai Nante Shinai =

- Promotional poster
- もう誘拐なんてしない
- Genre: Comedy; Mystery
- Based on: Mou Yuukai Nante Shinai by Tokuya Higashigawa
- Screenplay by: Kazunao Furuya
- Directed by: Yuichi Sato
- Starring: Satoshi Ohno; Yui Aragaki
- Theme music composer: Eishi Segawa
- Country of origin: Japan
- Original language: Japanese

Production
- Producers: Masataka Takamaru; Hiroko Emori

Original release
- Network: Fuji Television
- Release: January 3, 2012

Mou Yuukai Nante Shinai (もう誘拐なんてしない, I Won't Kidnap Anymore) is a Japanese drama special based on the novel of the same name by Tokuya Higashigawa and directed by Yuichi Sato. It received a viewership rating of 13.9%.

== Plot ==
Shotaro Tarui is an ordinary 29-year-old man who came to Tokyo 7 years ago, pursuing his childhood dream of becoming a hero. However, he now simply gets by as a part-time worker and has just lost his latest part-time job. The unexpected story unfolds as he finds himself planning a fake kidnapping after he suddenly receives a request from the daughter of a yakuza boss, Erika Hanazono.

== Cast ==
=== Main cast ===
- Satoshi Ohno as Shotaro Tarui
- Yui Aragaki as Erika Hanazono
- Maki Shinta as young Erika Hanazono
- Ryuta Sato as Kazuki Komoto
- Shihori Kanjiya as Satsuki Hanazono
- Hiroki Narimiya as Seiji Yamabe
- Masahiro Takashima as Takashi Kuroki
- Shota Yasuda as Kota Shiraishi
- Ryo Kimura as Shuhei Hirato
- Tokio Emoto as Toshiaki Kanda
- Sayaka Yamaguchi as Junko Tatsukawa
- Akiyoshi Nakao as Yuki Kato
- Kokoro Kuge as Shiori Arai
- Katsumi Takahashi as Tadao Yasukawa
- Jun Kaname as Yuya Takazawa
- Kinya Kitaoji as Shugoro Hanazono

=== Guest appearances ===
- Sho Sakurai as Kageyama (from Nazotoki wa Dinner no Ato de)
- Jun Matsumoto as Shuntaro Tokita (from Lucky Seven)
- Saki Fukuda as Shotaro's elementary school teacher
- Naoto Takenaka as Sliderman
- Katsuhisa Namase as the manager of the Hero Show
- Kei Tanaka as Youth A
- Yoji Tanaka as a barista
- Sumie Sasaki as a grocery shopkeeper
- Takashi Ukaji as a ramen shopkeeper
- Megumi Yokoyama as Mayuko Arai/Erika's mother
- Ikkei Watanabe as Kenjiro Takemura
- Kunihiro Matsumura as Hanazono's deliveryman
- Nobuhiko Takada as a bicycle courier
