= Taburakashi: Daiko Joyugyo Maki =

- Written by: Io Yasuda
- Starring: Mitsuki Tanimura; Koji Yamamoto; Yasunori Danta; Yuri Shirahane
- Opening theme: Sepia by Yu Takahashi
- Country of origin: Japan
- Original language: Japanese

Original release
- Network: NTV
- Release: 5 April 2012

Taburakashi: Daikō Joyūgyō Maki (たぶらかし ～代行女優業・マキ～) is a 2012 Japanese television drama series.

== Plot ==
Maki Todo, a young woman, comes to Tokyo with dreams of becoming an actress. However, the theatrical troupe she belonged to disbanded, and she has become burdened with 6 million yen worth of debt. Maki begins working as a stand-in actress, playing everything from a corpse to a ghost to a newlywed, but will she ever find her success as an actress?

== Cast ==
- Mitsuki Tanimura as Maki Tōdō
- Koji Yamamoto as Monzō Mizutori
- Yasunori Danta as Tokitada Matsudaira
- Yuri Shirahane as Mineko Fuji

== Guest stars ==
- Yoshiko Miyazaki as Sakurako Shiratori (Episode 1)
- Shugo Oshinari as Hiroto Shiratori (Episode 1)
- Chika Uchida as Yurie Shiratori (Episode 1)
- Rieko Miura as Nana Takeuchi (Episode 2)
- Asahi Uchida as Hirano (Episode 2)
