= Heaven's Story =

- Film poster
- Directed by: Takahisa Zeze
- Written by: Yuki Sato
- Starring: Moeki Tsuruoka; Tomoharu Hasegawa; Shugo Oshinari; Jun Murakami; Hako Yamazaki
- Cinematography: Atsuhiro Nabeshima; Koichi Saito; Yasushi Hanamura
- Edited by: Toshihiro Imai
- Music by: Goro Yasukawa
- Distributed by: Moviola
- Release date: October 2, 2010 (Japan)
- Running time: 278 minutes
- Country: Japan
- Language: Japanese

Heaven's Story (Japanese: ヘヴンズ ストーリー) is a 2010 Japanese drama film directed by Takahisa Zeze. It was screened in the Main Programme of the Forum section at the 61st Berlin International Film Festival, where it won the FIPRESCI Prize. It has also won the Séquences Prize at the Fantasia International Film Festival.

== Plot ==
Heaven's Story shows a murder and how it changes the lives of those people who were closely related to the victims.

== Cast ==
- Moeki Tsuruoka
- Tomoharu Hasegawa
- Shugo Oshinari
- Jun Murakami
- Hako Yamasaki
- Noriko Eguchi
- Mitsuru Fukikoshi
- Kyusaku Shimada
- Shun Sugata
- Ken Mitsuishi
- Kanji Tsuda
- Makiko Watanabe
- Nao Nagasawa
- Kōichi Satō
- Akira Emoto
