= Masaki Aiba =

Japanese musician and actor (born 1982)

- 相葉 雅紀
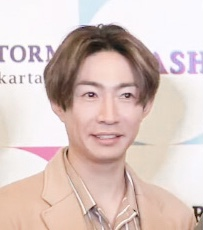
- Aiba in November 2019
- Born: Masaki Aiba; December 24, 1982 (age 43); Chiba, Chiba, Japan
- Other name: Aiba-chan
- Occupations: Singer; actor; television personality; radio host; dancer
- Spouse: Unknown (m. 2021)
- Children: 1
- Musical career
- Genre: J-pop
- Instruments: Vocals; guitar; harmonica; saxophone
- Years active: 1996–present
- Labels: Pony Canyon; Storm Labels
- Formerly of: Arashi

Masaki Aiba (相葉 雅紀, Aiba Masaki) (born December 24, 1982) is a Japanese singer, actor, television personality, radio host and dancer under Johnny & Associates, later of Starto Entertainment. He was a member of the boy band Arashi until the end of activities of the group, May 31, 2026.

Aiba began his career in the entertainment industry when he joined the Japanese talent agency Johnny & Associates in 1996, at the age of 13. Prior to his debut with Arashi in 1999, Aiba started an acting career when he was cast as the lead role of Gordie for the stage play Stand by Me, based on the film of the same name. In 2004, he became one of the co-hosts of the variety show Tensai Shimura Dōbutsuen (天才！志村どうぶつ園, Genius! Shimura Zoo), making him the first member of Arashi to regularly participate in a variety show not primarily hosted by Arashi.

== Early life ==
Aiba was born in Hanamigawa, Chiba as the first child of his family. He has a younger brother who is four years younger. Aiba was raised by his grandparents until he was four years old because his parents were busy running their newly opened Chinese cuisine restaurant then.

Prior to joining Johnny & Associates, Aiba watched a program called Love Love SMAP (愛ラブSMAP, Ai Rabu SMAP) and saw SMAP playing basketball on television. Wanting to play basketball with them, he sent in the application to join the talent agency himself, without exactly knowing what the agency specialized in until the day of auditions. Aiba became a Johnny's Jr. in August 1996 at the age of 13.

== Music career ==
In collaboration with the other members, he has written the lyrics to "Fight Song" and "5x10".

For his solo song "Hello Goodbye", Aiba played the blues harp harmonica in the interlude portion of the song. Aiba also used to play the saxophone; however, due to the collapse of one of his lungs in 2002, he was forced to stop playing.

== Acting career ==
=== Stage ===
Aiba began acting in a 1997 stage play based on an American coming of age film called Stand by Me with future bandmates Jun Matsumoto and Kazunari Ninomiya.

In 2005, Aiba took up the lead role of Keiji Takashima (高島 啓治, Takashima Keiji), a naive but honest station attendant living in a world after a World War III nuclear war, in Tsubame no Iru Eki (燕のいる駅, A Station with Swallows).

In 2007, Aiba portrayed Adam, a shy young man with a heart defect, in Wasurerarenai Hito (忘れられない人, Unforgettable Person). It was the first stage adaptation of the 1993 film Untamed Heart.

In early 2008, Aiba was given the lead role of Colin Briggs in the stage play called Greenfingers, which was adapted from the movie of the same name.

Aiba reunited with director Keiko Miyata (宮田 慶子, Miyata Keiko), who has been the director for his stage plays since 2005, and took on the lead role for Kimi to Miru Sen no Yume (君と見る千の夢, The Thousand Dreams I Dream With You), which ran from May 5 to 24, 2010. He portrayed a young man hovering over life and death due to a violent traffic accident.

In October 2024, Aiba took the role of Psychologist Edmund Einhard in Sony Music Group's room NB's project Reading High noir reading play "Thanatos", sharing the stage with Akio Otsuka and Saori Hayami. It is the first time Aiba participates in this kind of stage play. They reprise their roles in December 2026.

=== Drama ===
In 1997, Aiba made his drama debut portraying Akira, one of the many children left to survive in a city under government lockdown after a mysterious disease wipes out all the adults, in the drama Bokura no Yūki: Miman Toshi (ぼくらの勇気, Our Courage: Miman City). After the announcement of the formation of Arashi in September 1999 and their position as supporters for the 1999 Volleyball World Cup competition, all five members starred together for the first time in the volleyball-centered short drama V no Arashi.

Although Aiba was featured in a number of dramas such as Mukodono 2003 (ムコ殿2003, The Son-in-Law 2003) and Yankee Bokō ni Kaeru (ヤンキー母校に帰る, Drop-out Teacher Returns to School), he became more known for his appearances in variety shows instead and went on to focus on stage productions after Yankee Bokō ni Kaeru.

On August 2, 2009, it was announced that Aiba would not only act in his first drama series in nearly six years but also star as the lead actor for the first time. In My Girl, Aiba portrayed a young man who discovers that he has a five-year-old daughter after receiving the news that his girlfriend, who he has not seen in six years, was killed in an accident.

In January 2010, Aiba co-starred with the other members of Arashi in the human suspense drama special Saigo no Yakusoku. He portrayed Akira Tanada (棚田 昭, Tanada Akira), a 28-year-old coffee shop employee who is caught up in a building hijack. Starting January 2011, Aiba starred as genius bartender Ryū Sasakura (佐々 倉溜, Sasakura Ryū) in the drama adaptation of the manga Bartender. Aiba also made a guest appearance on the final episode of bandmate Ninomiya's drama Freeter, Ie o Kau (フリーター、家を買う。, Part-time Worker, Buys a House), which aired on December 21, 2010. In April 2012, Aiba once again starred in a lead role as "Katayama Yoshitaro" in the NTV drama adaption of the similarly named novel series, " Mikeneko Holmes no Suiri (三毛猫ホームズの推理). In 2013, took the lead role as a doctor in "Last Hope".

=== Film ===
In 2002, he made his motion picture debut in Pikanchi Life is Hard Dakedo Happy (ピカ☆ンチ Life is HardだけどHappy, Pikanchi Life is Hard But Happy), Arashi's first movie together, as the lead character Shun. He subsequently reprised his role for the 2004 sequel Pikanchi Life is Hard Dakara Happy (ピカ☆☆ンチ Life is HardだからHappy, Pikanchi Life is Hard Therefore Happy).

The group once again came together in 2007 to co-star in Kiiroi Namida (黄色い涙, Yellow Tears) with Aiba portraying an aspiring singer in the 1960s.

=== Animation ===
Aiba's debut as voice actor for a full-length animation film is with "Pui Pui Molcar The Movie ~ Molmax", a CG version of the series, released on November 29, 2024. Aiba has appeared in anime before, in one episode of KochiKame anime, with the other members of Arashi, in a mini sketch before the ending song Nice na Kokoroiki, which is sung by the group; in Crayon Shin-chan, in a short at the end of episode 983, as his character from his drama Boku to Shippo to Kagurazaka, and as character inspiration and voice actor for Koikeya SDGs Theater Suss and Tena, a mini anime from snack company Koikeya Inc.. For Molcar's movie, Aiba will play a human character in the Molcar's world. Details of the movie and of his character have not been revealed yet.

== Other ventures ==
=== Radio ===
Since October 5, 2001, Aiba has his own radio show Arashi's Aiba Masaki no Rekomen! Arashi Remix, which currently broadcasts on JOQR. On August 7, 2026, it was announced that the program would end at the end of September, closing a 25 year history with the station. Regarding this, Aiba commented that he would like to do another radio program in the future, as well as something with Nippon Cultural Broadcasting.

On May 17, 2009, Aiba hosted a special radio program on Tokyo FM called Muteki no Aiba-kun (ムテキの相葉クン!, Invincible Aiba).

=== Variety show host ===
In 2004 Aiba became a regular part of Ken Shimura's variety show Tensai! Shimura Dōbutsuen. With co-hosts of the show such as Tomomitsu Yamaguchi, Sayaka Aoki and Becky, Aiba interacts with various wild animals such as tigers, pandas and crocodiles in zoos both in and out of Japan, such as Singapore, South Africa, Philippines and Indonesia. After Shimura's passing on March 29, 2020, Aiba was given the lead of the show. The name for the show remained as a tribute to Shimura. As of June 3, 2020, NTV decided to end broadcasting "Tensai!" in September, stating as a reason that to continue filming on that stage, with all the memories gathered throughout almost 16 years that the show was on air, would be painfully difficult and heartbreaking. However, Aiba would continue as host of a new program with basically the same theme: the love for animals. The new show, I love みんなのどうぶつ園 (I love minna no doubutsuen), started airing in October. The show's format and name remained until April 2022, when it was renamed 嗚呼!!みんなの動物園 (Aa! Minna no doubutsuen), focusing now on the people who take care of rescued animals, mainly dogs and cats. Aiba, besides hosting the show, has an occasional corner trimming and washing rescued dogs, as part of his desire to take care of animals.

In 2013 Aiba began hosting a variety show Aiba Manabu airing in TV Asahi. Aiba and the audience enrich their knowledge about Japan through cooking and the local ingredients used, making ingredients (such as miso, tofu, soy sauce, etc.), making kitchenware from scratch, keeping indoor gardens. As part of the 10th anniversary celebration of the program, Aiba Manabu released on December 15, 2023, a recipe book with a variety of vegetable recipes chosen by Aiba and his co-hosts Eiji Kotoge and Yū Sawabe. In an interview regarding the book, Aiba said "This is the crystallization of 10 years of learning, for both performers and staff. I would be happy if readers could relax while reading this book, have fun thinking, 'What should I make next?' and get excited about cooking." On April 5, 2026, Aiba Manabu begins a new project imagined by Aiba. Using a 180–year old house as base, Aiba and team start with remodelations and adaptations to the house and the land around it. Taking advantage of the vast space behind the house, Aiba pilots an excavator to dig up the ground, and they cultivate fields for the summer. His plan is to turn the "Manabu House" into a base of operations, with possible expansion in the future to include a sushi store, a rotenburo and a pizza oven.

In 2014 he was one of the hosts for a two-week special live show that aired as part of TV Tokyo's 50th anniversary and Tokyo Tower's 55th anniversary celebrations, Tokyo Live 24 o'clock – Can Johnny's solve problems live!?, where 5 of Johnny's members alternated hosting the show every weeknight. Before the program started airing, members of the audience sent in messages sharing their joys and worries. The hosts tried to offer advice, while the audience voted with their TV for the options given. Aiba was the Wednesday host. The show became a regular program, with the same 5 hosts, airing every Sunday from October 2014 to September 2015.

In 2019, Aiba started hosting the program Hajimemashite! Ichiban tōi shinseki-san, in which guests get to know their "farthest relatives". Legally, a relative is considered to be the person with whom another is related, up to the sixth level of blood kinship, or by marriage, up to the third level. But the program examines the relationships between persons far removed from those limits. One of those examples was the family tree of singer and actor Daigo, who found out he was related (by in-law relationships) to John Lennon. Aiba continued as host in 2020, twice in 2021, twice in 2022, and again in 2023. Aiba hosted the special once again in 2024, making it the 8th time.

Starting in January 2021, Aiba hosts VS Damashii, which substituted Arashi's signature program VS Arashi, ended in December 2020. Aiba's program ended in Autumn 2023, after two incarnations (the original and Gradation), and coinciding with member Yuta Kishi leaving the agency and the Network's program reorganization period in October. A substitute program had not been revealed at the time, nor if Aiba would be hosting it. The substitute program was revealed on September 4, 2023, Mokushichi marubatsubu (木7◎×部), and the original idea of the program was of having school club-like activities, not available in school, with celebrities holding their own club activities, with Aiba and others in-studio watching over the challenges. The program started on October 26, and ended in March 2024, with its substitute's broadcast day changed to Saturday, shortened to 30 minutes, and broadcast area to the Kanto region. ending a long history of a national Arashi or Arashi member-hosted Thursday "Golden Hour" programming. Aiba's new program, Aiba marubatsubu, scheduled to start on April 13, originally continued with some of the activities of its predecessor.

=== Music show host ===
As part of Arashi, he led NHK's Kouhaku Uta Gassen's White Team from 2010 to 2014, and as himself, he was the 67th White Team Leader in 2016.

He hosted Fuji TV's FNS Kayōsai, aired on December 4 and 11, 2019, together with Mezamashi TV's Yūmi Nagashima. They repeat as hosts for FNS's Spring (2022), Summer (2020–2023), Autumn (2021) and Winter shows (2020–2022) For the 2023 Winter edition, he shares hosting duties with Fuji TV announcer Seika Inoue, since Nagashima would be on maternity leave. Inoue and Aiba continue for the Summer (2024–2026) and Winter (2024–2026) editions

=== Sports ===
From July 18 to 19, 2009, Aiba was appointed a Field Navigator for the Gymnastics Japan Cup 2009 (体操Japan Cup 2009, Taisō Japan Cup 2009). He was once again a navigator on October 18, 2009, for the World Artistic Gymnastics Championships 2009: London Rally (世界体操選手権2009 ロンドン大会, Sekai Taisō Senshuken 2009 Rondon Taikai).

In July 2010 Aiba was a Field Navigator for the Gymnastics Japan Cup 2010 (体操Japan Cup 2010, Taisō Japan Cup 2010). Aiba was the official navigator for Fuji Television's coverage of the 2010 World Artistic Gymnastics Championships, which was held in Rotterdam, Netherlands from October 16 to 24, 2010.

In 2016 he began hosting a sports show in NHK called Gutto! Sports, holding weekly warm discussions with guest athletes.

He was chosen, alongside his Arashi co-member Sho Sakurai, to host the NHK special program coverage for the Tokyo Olympics and Paralympics, celebrated from July 23, 2021.

On April 4, 2021, Aiba started a new corner in NHK's Sunday Sports, called "Aibuzz", short for "Aiba's Buzz", visiting athletes and sporting spots.

=== Documentaries and global environmental issues and SDG interest programs ===
From October 3, 2021, Aiba served as voice actor for Nissin Foods' subsidiary Koikeya's animated episodes of Suss to Tena (サスとテナ). The series focuses on sisters Suss and Tena and a tanuki named Bull, who are called to fight monsters caused by environmental and social problems. Aiba voices Aiba Sho (相葉蕉), a haiku poet who reflects about the episode's problem, and, at the end, gives haiku that triggers everyone to think about SDGs. The episodes aired on Tokyo MX and BS Asahi, and are hosted on Koikeya's YouTube channel.

Riku umi sora 4 K chūkei zekkei zenbu misemasu! Sekai shizen isan (陸・海・空 ４Ｋ中継 絶景ぜんぶ見せます！世界自然遺産) is NHK 4K channel's 5-episode series, started on March 18, 2023, in which Aiba, as special navigator, hosts a view at Japan's World Natural Heritage.

=== Other ===
Callaway Golf
Aiba was appointed as brand ambassador for Callaway Golf Company Japan in September 2024. He also opened the page Aiba Masaki with Callaway Golf on Instagram in which he shares his passion for the game, hoping "to convey its charm to those interested but that have never played, as well as to those who love it". On March 17, 2025, the "Callaway Aiba Masaki Line" clothing line was introduced. The clothing line includes tops, pants, caps, and gloves. Aiba thought of the design, not only as golf wear, but as everyday wear. Some of the designs feature artwork by Callaway's founder, Ely Callaway. The items became available exclusively at Callaway's flagship (Aoyama and Shinsaibashi) and online stores from March 27.

Nature and animal–related non-televised activities The National Museum of Nature and Science and NHK program Darwin ga kita collaboration exhibition "Super amazing world of life" (いきもの超ワールド展, Ikimono chō wārudo-ten) named Aiba as navigator for their "Survival strategies of living things" theme, scheduled from July 11 to October 12, 2026. Aiba is also a special navigator for the NHK program.

== Personal life ==
=== Health ===
Aiba suffered from pneumothorax twice, the first time in 2002, when Arashi was in the middle of the release of their song Nice na Kokoroiki. Aiba recalled this moment on the program These lyrics really hit home! Good phrase in March 2023. His doctor had warned him that this condition could recur. He was also informed that he could be forced to stop his artistic activities, not being able to sing or dance ever again. Seeing his groupmates participate in an event in Hawaii without him made him have mixed feelings. Listening to the aforementioned song, some of the lyrics motivated him to not give up. He ended up hospitalized 5 days, after undergoing surgery. The second time was in June 2011, during the taping of Arashi's signature program "Arashi ni shiyagare". Aiba felt a pain in his chest that scared him. He was taken to the hospital, where he was admitted immediately. He remained hospitalized for one week, and was under rest orders, having to suspend any and all strenuous activities, including rehearsals for a concert the group was holding the following month.

=== Marriage and family life ===
On September 28, 2021, Aiba announced his marriage through a letter he released in their fan club website. It was reported on October 23, 2022, via his agency, that he and his wife had welcomed their first born, a boy. The date of birth was not revealed. The birth of a second child in June 2025 was reported by Josei Seven, although there was no official information or confirmation.

== Commercials ==
CM

- Akita Foods
  - Kiyora Gourmet Preparation (2025-)
- Aqura Home Co., Ltd.(ja) (2023– )
- Asahi Group Holdings, Ltd.
  - Asahi Soft Drinks "Mitsuya Cider" (2020) with Arashi In 2021–2023, together with fellow Arashi member Sho Sakurai, and including Hey! Say! JUMP member Ryosuke Yamada, Snow Man members Ryohei Abe and Ren Meguro, and Johnny's Jr. group Bishounen in a series of commercials
  - Asahi Beer "Asahi zeitaku shibori" (March 2018)
- Bandai Namco Entertainment
  - Bandai Co., Ltd. Tamagotchi Mesutchi and Osutchi (1998) ~ with You Yokoyama and Jun Matsumoto
- Calbee Inc.
  - Frugra (April 2016-March 2018)
  - Potato Chip Crisp (August 2016-March 2018)
  - Jagabee (May 2017-March 2018)
- Duskin Co., Ltd. (ja)
  - Mister Donut Cotton Snow Candy (June 2014 – 2015)
- EBARA Foods Industry, Inc.(ja)
  - Ebara Yakiniku sauce Golden taste (March 2016-)
  - Ebara Sukiyaki Sauce (November 2016-)
- GungHo Online Entertainment, Inc.
  - Puzzles and Dragons (July 2016 – 2020) ~ with Arashi
- House Foods
  - Refreshing Super Catechin (2004)
  - Tongari corn (2007)
  - Vermont curry (ja) (2009-March 2013)
- House Wellness Foods Co., Ltd. (ja) C1000 Refresh Lemon & Lime (2007)
- Ikeda Mohando Pharmaceutical (ja)
  - Liquid Muhi S (2010- )
  - Muhi Alpha EX (2010- )
- Japanet Holdings
  - Japanet Takata (2026–)
- Kirin Company, Ltd
  - Kirin Beverage Company, Ltd
    - Kirin Mets Cola (December 2013-February 2016) ~ with Satoshi Ohno
    - Kirin Mets (March 2016-November 2016) ~ with Satoshi Ohno and Jun Matsumoto
- Kosé Corporation
  - Kosé Cosmeport
    - Je l'aime (2013 - 2020) - co-starring with Jun Matsumoto
    - Softymo Natu Savon Select (July 2017 – 2023)
- Lion Corporation
  - Soflan Premium Deodorant Plus with aroma and deodorant (March 2017-); 2021 with fellow Arashi member Kazunari Ninomiya, in a collaborative visual campaign with Top Super Nanox
- Meiji Co., Ltd.
  - Meiji Dairies Corporation
    - Meiji Delicious Low Fat Milk (April 2019 – 2023)
- Mercedes-Benz Japan
  - smart (November 2015-October 2016 / April 2017-April 2018)
  - Safe and Secure Campaign Radar Safety Package (April 2017-April 2018)
- Mikakuto Co., Ltd (ja)
  - throat lozenge (November 2011-November 2013)
  - throat lozenge EX (November 2011-November 2013)
  - Shigekicks Zerosh (July 2012 – 2014)
  - Gummy Gum (March 2013 – 2014)
  - Kororo (November 2014-October 2015)
- Morinaga & Company
  - Morinaga Milk Industry pino ice cream (May 1998 – 2000)
- Mynavi Corporation (2025– )
- Nissin Foods
  - Koikeya (2021- )
    - Koikeya The nori shio / The kōji shio (2021)
    - Koikeya The Ebi (2022)
    - KoiJaga (2022)
    - Koikeya Pride Potato (2023, with Sexy Zone's Kento Nakajima)
    - Koikeya The sozai no gochisō potato (2023)
    - Koikeya Farm (2024)
    - Kin no potato (2026, with Yumia Fujisaki)
- Rizap Group
  - ChocoZap (2025-)
- Seven & I Holdings
  - Seven-Eleven Japan (2025- ) (with Sho Sakurai)
- Sumitomo Life Insurance Company W Stage Future Design (April 2011-March 2015)
- Tokio Marine & Nichido (January 2022 – 2023)

== Filmography ==
=== Television ===
==== Television programs ====
Year	Title	Related program	Role	Notes	Ref.
2004–2020	Tensai! Shimura Dōbutsuen		Assistant to Ken Shimura; Host	Aiba became host after Shimura's death, in March 2020, until the end of the program Aiba and others interact with animals in and outside the studio	
2011	Masaki Aiba's Bartender Mission (special)	Bartender drama	Host	TV Asahi special	
2013–	Aiba Manabu		Host	Cooking show with cooking–related learning, helped by a base team, and an on–location or on–video guest. A new project starts in April 2026, "Manabu House", thought to be set as a base of operations.	
2019–2023	Hajimemashite! Ichiban tooi shinseki san		Host	Aiba shows guests a family tree with their farthest relatives (celebrity, politician, entrepreneur, etc.), either by consanguinity or by affinity	
2020–2022	I love Minna no Doubutsuen	Tensai! Shimura Dōbutsuen	Host	Followed same format as previous show	
2021–2023	VS Damashii	VS Arashi	Host	Replaced Arashi's program, keeping same format Program changed format and name to "VS Damashii: Gradation" in 2022	
2022–	Aa! Minna no doubutsuen	I love Minna no Doubutsuen	Host	Format changed, focusing on rescue animals	
2022	I love Lets become a family	I love Minna no Doubutsuen	Host	Special collaboration between NTV's I love Minna no Doubutsuen and NHK's Let's become a family (家族になろうよ, Kazoku ni narou yo), with Nahoko Suzuki from the NHK show appearing with Aiba on I love... and NTV's Rena Ichiki and Sunshine Ikezaki returning the favor on NHK.	
2023–2024	Mokushichi marubatsubu	VS Damashii	Host	Program gave opportunity to guest celebrities to have challenges not included in School Clubs	
2023–	Aiba Hiromi no o komaridesu kā? [ja]		Host	4 individual specials, co–hosted with Hiromi. Part of Thursday's regular programming starting in September 2025. Aiba and Hiromi travel through Japan's prefectures seeking to help people with their needs in a short period of time.	
2024–	Aiba marubatsubu	Mokushichi marubatsubu	Host	Co-host with Kazuki Enari. Some of the same format of previous one Moved to Saturday afternoon and only-Kanto broadcast area, ending Fuji TV's Arashi / Arashi member-controlled "Thursday Golden Hour"; Changed format to a different activity per episode, such as guests participating in a 13–character clue–related search for friends; Aiba, Enari and guests are "Menu Detectives", with winning team getting the dish guessed from clues by the restaurant's chef and/or owner; Aiba, Enari and guests pick from two clues from each one of the participants, with those answering correctly getting to enjoy specialty sushi; "Group-responsibility golf", where Aiba and Enari form teams of three with guests, and try to get a golf ball into the courses' holes in the least amount of hits.	
2024–	Monomane Monster		Host	Co-host with Heisei Nobushi Kobushi's Takashi Yoshimura; Celebrity impressions.	
2024	24-Hr TV Telethon		Chosen as 1st of 24 hosts	Hosts 1 of the 24 sections in this year's event	
2024	Geinō-kai shin'yū dokyumento jiman no tomodachi o jiman no furusato ni tsurete kaerimashita!		Guest	Hosted by Viking's Mizuki Nishimura and Eiji Kotoge. Kotoge takes long time friend Aiba to his hometown	
2024–2025	Ano koro kara watashitachi wa		Guest, host	2024: Traveled to Korea to meet with BTS's Jin; 2025: Travel to Osaka to meet with BTS's Jin	
2025–	Aiba Motors	Arashi ni Shiyagare section	Host	Co-hosted together with Eiji Kotoge. Based on Aiba's travel on motorcycle section on Arashi's Arashi ni Shiyagare	
2025–	Kuchi o Soroeta Kowai Hanashi: Saying the Same Mystery/Kuchi o soroeta Fushigina Hanashi	USO!? Japan	Host	Aiba and Snow Man's Tatsuya Fukasawa, together with guests ("SSM members") analyze scary, mysterious, and strange stories.	
2026	Friday Mystery Club (金曜ミステリークラブ, Kin'yō misuterīkurabu)		Guest	"Friendship appearance" in fellow Arashi member Kazunari Ninomiya's program. Aiba portrays a fireman in a representation of a case.	

==== Documentaries ====
Year	Title	Role	Notes	Ref.
2011–2012	21-nin no Wa	Narrator	Documentary series. Follows a group of students and their teachers from Isobe Elementary School in Soma City, Fukushima, after the earthquake and subsequent tsunami.	
2011	Japan's Wildlife: The Untold Story	Narrator	Documentary film. Nature photographers taking images of 30 sites around Japan over two and a half years	
2020	Daremo Shiranai Shimura Ken	Himself	24 Hour Television special. Biographical drama/documentary, with people related to Shimura talking about his life.	
2024	A large family on a mountaintop! The Honda family: 14 years of "laughter and tears" with 3 sons and 4 daughters. (山の上の大家族!本多さんチ 3男4女の「泣き笑い」14年, Yama no ue no dai kazoku! Honda-san chi 3 otoko 4 on'na no `nakiwarai' 14-nen) [ja]	Host	Documentary film. A deep look at a family who chose the mountains over the city, first covered on the news program "news every".	
2025	Darwin ga kita	Narrator	Monthly special from July 2025. Visits to nature areas around Japan	
2025	Aiba's Great Adventure	Host	Prime Video's nature adventure program by NHK's "Darwin" production team. Visits to unexplored areas of Japan	
2025	Walking with Dinosaurs Prologue	Navigator	Documentary special. The August 8 program showed highlights of the series that aired 2 days later.	
2026	Sekai de ake! Himitsu no doāzu	Host	Overseas travelogue	

==== Animation ====
Year	Title	Role	Notes	Ref.
2018	Crayon Shin-chan	Tatsuya Koenji	animated, voice, Short (episode 983) "Ora to Shippo to Kagurazaka dazo",	
2021	Sus to Tena	Shō Aiba	Animated, voice, 5 seasons	
2024	Tono to Inu	Tono	Animated, voice, plays one of the Lords	
2024	Pui Pui Molcar The Movie ~ Molmax	Many Many Eyes Company CEO	Animated movie, voice, plays one of the humans	

==== Dramas ====
Year	Title	Role	Notes	Ref.
1997	Bokura no Yūki: Miman Toshi	Akira		
1998	Don't Worry!	Hideto Enomoto	Episode 11: "Boku Tantei ni Naritai"	
1998	Boys Be... Jr.	Kanji Sugiyama / Naoyuki	Episodes: 6 "Imitation Couple", & 12 "Christmas wa Kimi to Isshoni"	
1998	Shōnentachi	Kei Matsushita		
1999	Nekketsu Ren'ai-dō	Yūji Ueda / Hiroshi Kanda / Yamanaka Taichi	Episodes: "Case 1: Iteza no O-gata Boy", "Case 3: Sasoriza no A-gata Boy", "Case 14: Oushiza no O-gata boy"	
1999	Ppoi!	Banri Kusaka		
1999	Kowai Nichiyōbi	Masaki Aiba	Episode 5: "Ugokasu Na!"	
1999	V no Arashi	Masaki Aiba	Lead role with Arashi members	
2000	Shijō Saiaku no Dēto	Date king / Yūichiro	Lead role	
2001	Mukodono	Ryo Takeyama		
2001	Shōnen Taiya: Gypsy	Roku	Four-episode drama	
2002	Shōnen Taiya: Aoki-san Chi no Oku-san	Masaki	Four-episode drama	
2003	Yoiko no Mikata	Akira Mataki	Episode: "Chichi to Musume... Namida no Doronko Asobi"	
2003	Kaigo Kazoku: Hana, Sakimakka	Akira Mataki	Television special	
2003	Gekidan Engimono: Kurū ga Mama	Kazuya	Lead role, four-episode drama	
2003	Yankee Bokō ni Kaeru	Tetsuji Yashiki		
2006	Triple Kitchen	Eisaku Odajima	Television special	
2006	Kuitan Special	Extra	Cameo appearance	
2009	My Girl	Masamune Kazama	Lead role	
2010	Saigo no Yakusoku	Akira Tanada	Lead role with Arashi members, television special	
2010	Freeter, Ie o Kau	Hirata	Episode: "Kaa-san ga, Waratta"	
2011	Bartender	Ryū Sasakura	Lead role	
2011	Freeter, Ie o Kau SP	Hirata	Guest appearance	
2012	Mikeneko Holmes no Suiri	Yoshitaro Katayama	Lead role	
2013	Last Hope	Takumi Hatano	Lead role	
2014	Miracle: Devil Claus' Love and Magic	Hikaru Yamamoto	Lead role	
2015	Yōkoso, Wagaya e	Kenta Kurata	Lead role	
2017	Kizoku Tantei	Kizoku Tantei	Lead role	
2017	Bokura no Yūki: Miman Toshi SP	Akira		
2018	Boku to Shippo to Kagurazaka	Tatsuya Kōenji	Lead role	
2019	Kizuna no Pedal	Miyazawa Takashi (adult)	Lead role, 24 Hour TV drama special	
2021	The Men of the Wada Family	Yū Wada	Lead role	
2023	Hitoribotchi ~ Hitori to hito o tsunagu ai no monogatari	Sugi Shinya	Lead role, TBS	
2023	Kyō Kara Hitman	Tokichi Inaba	Lead role, TV Asahi	
2025	The Great Chase ~Metropolitan Police Department SSBC Violent Crimes Unit~	Rintaro Nanami	Lead role, TV Asahi	
2026	The Great Chase ~Metropolitan Police Department SSBC Violent Crimes Unit~ Season 2	Rintaro Nanami	Lead role, TV Asahi	

=== Film ===
Year	Title	Role	Notes	Ref.
1998	Shinjuku Shōnen Tantei-dan	Sōsuke Hashiba		
2002	Pikanchi Life Is Hard Dakedo Happy	Shun Okano	Lead role	
2004	Pikanchi Life Is Hard Dakara Happy	Shun Okano		
2007	Kiiroi Namida	Shōichi Inoue	Lead role with Arashi members	
2014	Pikanchi Life Is Hard Tabun Happy	Shun Okano	Lead role with Arashi members	
2014	Miracle Debikuro-kun no Koi to Mahō	Hikari Yamamoto	Lead role	
2022	It's in the Woods	Jun'ichi Tanaka	Lead role	
2026	4 Outs: Back to the Ballgame	Yagami	Lead role	

== Discography ==
=== Solo songs ===
Song	Album	Release year	Ref.
Namida no nagare boshi (Shoichi Inoue version)	Kiiroi namida Soundtrack	2007	
Itsuka no Summer	One	2005	
Friendship	Time	2007	

=== Musical contributions ===
Are You Happy? song "Seishun boogie" (recording under Aiba's supervision)

== Stage ==
Year	Title	Role	Notes	Ref
1997	Stand By Me	Gordie	Lead role	
1997	Kyo to Kyo			
2005	Tsubame no Iru Eki	Keiji Takashima	Lead role	
2007	Wasurerarenai Hito	Adam	Lead role	
2009	Greenfingers	Colin Briggs	Lead role	
2010	Kimi to Miru Sen no Yume	Haruya Ikebe	Lead role	
2022	Yōkoso, Minato-sensei	Takanari Minato	Lead role	
2024, 2026	Thanatos	Edmund Einhard		
2025	Good Bye, Lenin!	Alex	lead role	

== Awards ==
Year	Organization	Award	Work	Result
2010	13th Nikkan Sports Drama Grand Prix (Autumn)	Best Actor	My Girl	Won
2010	TV Navi Drama Awards (Autumn)	Best Newcomer	My Girl	Won
2016	85th Television Drama Academy Awards	Best Actor	Yōkoso, Wagaya e	Nominated
2016	25th TV Life Awards	Best Actor	Yōkoso, Wagaya e	Won
2017	93rd Television Drama Academy Awards	Best Actor	Kizoku Tantei	Nominated
2017	21st Nikkan Sports Drama Grand Prix (Spring)	Best Actor	Kizoku Tantei	Nominated
2018	27th TV Life Awards	Best Actor	Kizoku Tantei	Won
2018	22nd Nikkan Sports Drama Grand Prix (Autumn)	Best Actor	Boku to Shippo to Kagurazaka	Won
2022	25th Nikkan Sports Drama Grand Prix	Best Actor	The Men of the Wada Family	Won
2024	32nd Hashida Prize	Drama	Hitoribotchi ~ Hitori to hito o tsunagu ai no monogatari	Won
2024	32nd Hashida Prize	Actor, singer and talent	"Hitoribotchi", "Kyou kara hitman", and activities in music and variety shows.	Won

== Books ==
Name	Release date	ISBN	Notes	Ref
Easy every day! Aiba Manabu's 365-day vegetable recipes	December 15, 2023	4910596186	Topped Oricon's Weekly Culinary & Gourmet Ranking in the first week of release	
