= Freestyle (art exhibition) =

Freestyle is an art exhibition by Japanese artist Satoshi Ohno, member of musical group Arashi. The first edition took place in 2008 in Omotesando Hills. Two more editions took place in 2015 and 2020 in Japan, as well as one in Shanghai in 2015.

== Freestyle beginnings ==
"Freestyle" ran from February 21 to 29, 2008, at Omotesando Hills Space O in Tokyo, with an expected number of 30,000 visitors. It included over 200 works in several forms. Many of Ohno's works created before he had entered Johnny & Associates, exhibited in Freestyle, included paintings, clay models, photographs, big objects d'art, and more. Ohno created all these works as part of his hobby, many done in his spare time, in off-days, between performances with his group, or acting break moments. When the exhibition opened, Ohno said "It's a strange feeling to have so many people see the work that I have been making for 10 years in such... big venue". A companion book, also named "Freestyle", was released days before, on February 8, and by the time the exhibition opened, it was already on its third printing. In May, the exhibition changed name to "Freestyle All Around Japan", opening in Osaka (Kyocera Dome Osaka 9F Sky Hall, May 14–18), Nagoya (Asunal Hall, May 28- June 1), Tokyo (JCB Hall, June 12–15), Sapporo (Sapporo Dome, in front of the West Gate Special venue) and Fukuoka (Zepp Fukuoka, June 18–22).

== Freestyle II ==
In 2015, Ohno announced a second edition of his art exhibition. With the name "Freestyle II", it would open in Tokyo, at Omotesando Space O, from July 24 to August 23, and Osaka from March 3 to April 3, 2016, after seven and a half years of the first one, which was visited by around 100,000 people in 6 venues. This time, 30 new works would be included in the exhibit: 15 figures and 15 paintings, some of the latter being oil paintings, a first for Ohno. As with the first one, a companion book would also be released, this time on July 24, taking the name of the exhibition. The book sold 115,000 units in the first week.

From July 9 to 29, Ohno's art would also be displayed in Shanghai, at the Shanghai Johhan Art Museum. This one, named as "Freestyle in Shanghai 2015", would include several of the works seen in "Freestyle", around 50-60 sculptures and 20 paintings. It was Ohno's first overseas art exhibition. About it, Ohno's comment was: “I did not imagine holding an exhibit overseas. I wonder what kind of reaction would they have?”. In just the first day, the exhibition hosted 1,600 people, and by the day before, over 24,000 advance tickets had been sold. Ohno traveled from Japan on the 5th-6th to check on the venue, where he wrote on red paint "Xie Xie", saying: "I'm looking forward to seeing how the people of Shanghai will view it and what their reactions will be."

== Freestyle 2020 ==
5 years later, in 2020, amidst the chaos brought by the COVID-19 pandemic, Ohno held the last exhibition before taking a break from public activities. "Freestyle 2020" was held from September 9 to November 8 at Roppongi Hills Observatory Tokyo City View in Tokyo. His comment about it: "This show will include previous works and a lot of newer ones, too. Looking back on my earlier works and spending time with them brought back lots of memories. From these past works, to the latest ones, FREESTYLE 2020 is packed with my latest thoughts and ideas. I hope everyone will find something to enjoy there”. The exhibition contained from miniature paintings, to a large head sculpture, to the painting of what would become Arashi's single "Kite" cover image. Later that year, it was revealed that the exhibition would be taken to the virtual world. Held on December 11, Ohno would take the digital visitors on a tour looking around through his works. It was also revealed that the physical exhibition would take place in Osaka's Grand Front Osaka, from December 21 to February 28, 2021, exclusively for members of Arashi's fan club, with projects and new goods unique to the Osaka venue.

As with the previous two events, a companion book was released by the time of the opening of the exhibition. The book ranked first in the "Oricon Weekly Book Ranking" dated October 19, after selling 40,000 units the first week of sales.

In addition to the exhibition, this year's event also had another thing close to Ohno's heart. It had been a dream of his to become a baker, and this year, in "Cafe The Sun", the café located next to the exhibition venue, a "bakery" was installed for the duration of the event, under the name "Satoshi's Curry Bread Bakery". The bakery offered curry bread with Ohno's original curry recipe. The recipe written on a recipe card was also enclosed with the purchase inside the paper bag as a bonus.
