= Sketches of Kaitan City =

- Theatrical release poster
- 海炭市叙景
- Directed by: Kazuyoshi Kumakiri
- Written by: Takashi Ujita
- Based on: Yasushi Sato
- Produced by: Michio Koshikawa
- Starring: Mitsuki Tanimura; Pistol Takehara; Ryo Kase; Kaho Minami; Kaoru Kobayashi
- Cinematography: Ryuto Kondo
- Edited by: Yoshisuke Hori
- Music by: Jim O'Rourke
- Distributed by: Slow Learner
- Release date: 18 December 2010 (Japan)
- Running time: 152 minutes
- Country: Japan
- Language: Japanese

Sketches of Kaitan City (Japanese: 海炭市叙景, Hepburn: Kaitanshi Jokei) is a 2010 Japanese drama film directed by Kazuyoshi Kumakiri and starring Mitsuki Tanimura and Ryo Kase.

== Cast ==
- Mitsuki Tanimura as Honami Ikawa
- Pistol Takehara as Futa Ikawa
- Ryo Kase as Haruo Meguro
- Masaki Miura as Hiroshi Hagiya
- Takashi Yamanaka as Makoto Kudou
- Kaoru Kobayashi as Ryuzo Hika
- Kaho Minami as Haruyo Hika

== Release ==
The film had its world premiere at the Tokyo International Film Festival in 2010. It was released in Japan on 18 December 2010.

== Reception ==
Dustin Chang of Twitch Film felt that the film "resembles strongly of the neo-neo realism of the Dardenne brothers' films but without their sense of hope". Meanwhile, Maggie Lee of The Hollywood Reporter noted Kazuyoshi Kumakiri's "low key but tender depictions of working class people and subtle assimilation of socio-economical realities, redolent of the works of Jia Zhangke and Wang Bing's West of the Tracks".
