= Shugo Oshinari =

Japanese actor (born 1981)

- 忍成 修吾
- Born: March 5, 1981 (age 45); Chiba, Chiba, Japan
- Occupation: Actor
- Years active: 1998–present
- Spouse: Unknown (m. 2022)

Shugo Oshinari (忍成 修吾, Oshinari Shūgo; born March 5, 1981) is a Japanese actor.

== Career ==
Oshinari co-starred in Shunji Iwai's All About Lily Chou-Chou with Hayato Ichihara. He also appeared in films such as Kenta Fukasaku's Battle Royale II: Requiem and Takahisa Zeze's Heaven's Story.

Oshino also played as Nakatsuka in the 2005 drama, Boys over Flowers.

== Personal life ==
On February 17, 2022, via his official Twitter account, Oshinari announced that he has married a non-celebrity woman, whom he had been seeing for quite some time.

He attended Chiba Keizai University High School.

== Filmography ==
=== Film ===
- Blue Spring (2001)
- All About Lily Chou-Chou (2001)
- Tomie: Re-birth (2001)
- Battle Royale II: Requiem (2003)
- The Cat Leaves Home (2004)
- Animus Anima (2005)
- Year One in the North (2005)
- Lorelei: The Witch of the Pacific Ocean (2005)
- School Daze (2005)
- Taki 183 (2006)
- Akihabara@Deep (2006)
- Baby, Baby, Baby! (2009)
- Heaven's Story (2010)
- The Lightning Tree (2010)
- The Egoists (2011)
- A Pale Woman (2013)
- Crying 100 Times: Every Raindrop Falls (2013)
- Kamen Rider Wizard in Magic Land (2013)
- Kabukicho Love Hotel (2014)
- Dark Side of the Light (2016)
- Impossibility Defense (2018)
- My Friend "A" (2018)
- We Are Little Zombies (2019)
- Mio on the Shore (2019)
- Stare (2020)
- Around the Table (2021)
- Scroll (2023)
- Shylock's Children (2023)
- Hakkenden: Fiction and Reality (2024)
- Paradise of Solitude (2024)
- Suicide Notes Laid on the Table (2025), Makoto Kaihara
- The Sickness Unto Love (2025), Yoshihiko Miyamine

=== Television ===
- Boys Over Flowers (2005), Nakatsuka
- Maō (2008), Soda Mitsuru
- Hanayome to Papa (2008), Kanda Ryuta
- Orthros no Inu (2009)
- Kagi no Kakatta Heya (2012), Nakano Shuya
- Taburakashi: Daikō Joyūgyō Maki (2012)
- Rekishi Hiwa Historia (2013), Saitō Hajime
- Gunshi Kanbei (2014), Konishi Yukinaga
- Death Note (2015), Mikami Teru
- Segodon (2018), Inoue Kaoru
- Piple (2020), Yasunari Shukugawa
- Reach Beyond the Blue Sky (2021), Iwasaki Yanosuke
- Kamen Rider Geats (2022), Girori
- Dai Byoin Senkyo / Captured Hospital (2023), Red Demon / Mimasaka Takashi
- What Will You Do, Ieyasu? (2023), Ōtani Yoshitsugu
- Masked Ninja Akakage (2025), Takigawa Kazumasu
- Brothers in Arms (2026), Bessho Shigemune
