= Mitsuki Tanimura =

Japanese actress

- 谷村 美月
- Born: June 18, 1990 (age 36); Sakai, Osaka, Japan
- Occupation: Actress
- Years active: 2002–present
- Agent: Hori Agency

Mitsuki Tanimura (谷村 美月, Tanimura Mitsuki) is a Japanese actress.

== Biography ==
Tanimura was born in Sakai, Osaka. She starred in Akihiko Shiota's Canary and Norio Tsuruta's Orochi. She has also appeared in films such as Takashi Miike's God's Puzzle, Junji Sakamoto's Strangers in the City, and Kazuyoshi Kumakiri's Sketches of Kaitan City.

== Filmography ==
=== Film ===
- Canary (2005)
- Tokyo Zombie (2005)
- The Girl Who Leapt Through Time (2006), Kaho Fujitani (voice)
- The Chasing World (2008)
- God's Puzzle (2008)
- Orochi (2008), Orochi
- Summer Wars (2009), Kazuma Ikezawa (voice)
- Kanikōsen (2009)
- Oblivion Island: Haruka and the Magic Mirror (2009), Miho (voice)
- Mei-chan no Shitsuji (2009)
- 13 Assassins (2010)
- Box! (2010)
- Strangers in the City (2010)
- Sketches of Kaitan City (2010)
- Hankyū Densha (2011), Miho
- Salvage Mice (2011)
- Soup (2012)
- Ace Attorney (2012)
- Wolf Children Ame and Yuki (2012), Doi's wife (voice)
- The Samurai That Night (2013)
- Girl in the Sunny Place (2013)
- The Liar and His Lover (2013)
- Sweet Poolside (2014)
- The Edge of Sin (2015)
- A Sower of Seeds 2 (2015)
- Recall (2018)
- Rose and Tulip (2019), Kaori
- Stare (2020), Fuyumi Mamiya
- Nobutora (2021)
- Love Song from Hiroshima (2025)
- Lives at Right Angles (2026)

=== Television ===
- Bio Planet WoO (2006), Ai Kumashiro
- 14-sai no Haha (2006), Mayu Yanagisawa
- Torihada (2007-2009), Woman
- Pandora (2008), Emi Mizuno
- Taiyo to Umi no Kyoshitsu (2008), Hana Sawamizu
- Mei-chan's Butler (2009), Tami Yamada
- Hissatsu Shigotonin 2009 (2009), Kisaragi
- Samurai High School (2009), Samurai Kōtarō's Wife
- Team Medical Dragon (2010), Fuyumi Magara
- Mori no Asagao (2010), Koharu Yoshioka
- Honjitsu wa Taian Nari (2012), twins Kagayama Himika and Kagayama Marika
- Taburakashi: Daikō Joyūgyō Maki (2012), Maki Tōdō
- Platinum Town (2012), Haruna Yamada
- Last Hope (2013), Kyōko Nishimura
- Yae's Sakura (2013), Tokie Oda
- Kōnodori (2015)
- Beppin san (2016), Akemi Ono
- Enjoy Drinking Alone (2021), Wakana Gotō
- Unbound (2025), Shizu
- Blossom (2026), Sanae Natsui
