= Kyou no Hi wa Sayounara =

- Promotional poster
- 今日の日はさようなら
- Genre: Drama
- Based on: Oozora e no Tabidachi ~Gan to Tatakai Nagara mo Yume Miteita Mirai by Kazuya Miyuki
- Written by: Atsuko Hashibe
- Directed by: Shintaro Sugawara
- Starring: Satoshi Ohno
- Theme music composer: Junichi Matsumoto
- Country of origin: Japan
- Original language: Japanese

Production
- Producers: Hidehiro Kawano; Hiroko Okura

Original release
- Network: Nippon TV
- Release: August 24, 2013

Kyou no Hi wa Sayounara (今日の日はさようなら, Farewell for Today) is a Japanese drama special, directed by Shintaro Sugawara, part of Nippon TV's annual 24 Hour Television: "Love Saves the Earth" telethon. It received a viewership rating of 23.4%.

== Plot ==
Kouta Fujioka is a 29-year old man who has a good family, including his father who always supports him, his mother who enjoys cooking, and his older sister with her bright personality. He also has a girlfriend named Etsuko Tanebe. Kouta wants people to eat delicious foods made by him and begins a job as an apprentice chef at a restaurant. One day, Kouta suddenly passes out and is sent to the hospital, where he is diagnosed with malignant lymphoma, completely changing his life. Given three months left to live, Kouta makes up his mind, with the support of his family and those he meets at the hospital, to accept his fate and "face a proper death".

== Cast ==
- Satoshi Ohno as Kouta Fujioka
- Tomokazu Miura as Kenjirou Fujioka
- Kayoko Kishimoto as Yasuko Fujioka
- Mimura as Koharu Fujioka
- Kyoko Fukada as Yuriko Ohkubo
- Fumino Kimura as Etsuko Tanebe
- Ryosuke Yamada as Harada
- Kyūsaku Shimada as Hiroki Murayama
- Ken Mitsuishi as Tetsuo Machida
- Rio Tanaka as Kouta Fujioka (child)
- Hana Ikeda as Koharu Fujioka (child)
