= Devil (TV series) =

- Maō (魔王)
- Genre: Drama; Suspense
- Created by: Park Chan Hong; Kim Ji Woo; Lee Duk Kwun
- Written by: Yōichi Maekawa; Masafumi Nishida
- Directed by: Arata Katō; Toshio Tsuboi; Tsuyoshi Katayama
- Starring: Satoshi Ohno; Toma Ikuta; Ryoko Kobayashi
- Theme music composer: Hydrant
- Opening theme: truth by Arashi
- Composer: Hiroyuki Sawano
- Country of origin: Japan
- Original language: Japanese
- No. of episodes: 11

Production
- Executive producers: Masanao Takahashi; Ryōsuke Watanabe
- Running time: approx. 49 minutes

Original release
- Network: TBS
- Release: July 4 – September 12, 2008

Related
- Ryūsei no Kizuna; Lucifer

Devil (Japanese: 魔王, Hepburn: Maō; lit. 'The Devil', or 'Demon King'), officially stylized as dEVIL, is a Japanese remake of the Korean suspense drama series titled The Devil which aired on KBS 2TV in 2007. The drama stars Satoshi Ohno of Arashi and Toma Ikuta, both under the talent agency Johnny & Associates.

== Synopsis ==
Ryo Naruse (Satoshi Ohno) is a two-faced lawyer: on the surface, he is a kind-hearted soul, representing the poor and earning the nickname "The Angel Lawyer" from the press; but unbeknownst to anyone else, he is also a "devil," meticulously plotting the perfect revenge against those responsible for his younger brother's death. Naoto Serizawa (Toma Ikuta) is a gung-ho detective whose overzealous methods mask a dark past which he is trying to overcome. When a family acquaintance of Serizawa's is murdered, Serizawa is thrust in the middle of a multiple-homicide case which stirs up memories of a dark event from his past.

== Opening theme song ==
The theme song for this series is "Truth" by Arashi, a popular Japanese boy band which Satoshi Ohno is the leader of. In a preview of "Truth" promotional video on TBS morning entertainment news program 2jichaō, Ohno explains that the meaning of the song is very close to the content and feel of the whole drama. Arashi displayed their dancing in the promotional video of "Truth" with Ohno as the lead. It was revealed in Maō's official blog (written by the staffs / producers and posted at their official site) Ohno diligently practiced the intricate dance move in between takes because of his busy schedule.

== Cast ==
=== Primary cast ===
- Satoshi Ohno as Ryo Naruse
- Toma Ikuta as Naoto Serizawa
- Ryoko Kobayashi as Shiori Sakita
- Kei Tanaka as Hitoshi Kasai
- Shugo Oshinari as Mitsuru Souda
- Tomohiro Waki as Yosuke Ishimoto
- Misa Uehara as Kaoru Takatsuka
- Mai Shinohara as Eri Nishina
- Yutaka Shimizu as Keita Yamano
- Kisuke Iida as Kanrikan Ishihara
- Toshihide Tonesaku as Takashi Kurata
- Michiko Kichise as Mari Serizawa
- Hitori Gekidan as Noriyoshi Serizawa
- Yuji Miyake as Hiromichi Nakanishi
- Koji Ishizaka as Eisaku Serizawa

=== Secondary cast ===
- Hiroki Kouno as young Toomo Manaka
- Toshi Takeuchi as Hideo Manaka
- Haruki Kimura as young Naoto Serizawa
- Kayano Masuyama as young Shiori Sakita
- Yuto Uemura as young Hitoshi Kasai
- Haruo Honma as young Mitsuru Souda
- Ryunoshin Nakamura as young Yosuke Ishimoto

=== Guest appearances ===
- Kazunari Ninomiya as Masayoshi Kumada (episode 1)
- Mayumi Asaka as Yoshimi Manaka (episodes 1, 2, 4)
- Tetsuo Morishita as Takahiro Kumada (episodes 1, 2)
- Kitaro as Kunio Hayashi (episodes 1, 2)
- Kaoru Okunuki as Tae Shintani (episodes 2–4)
- Momoka Oono as Sora Shintani (episodes 2–5, 7)
- Naomasa Musaka as Takahiro Ikehata (episodes 4–7)
- Yūka as Makiko Naruse (episodes 4–7)
- Outa Tanino as the real Ryo Naruse (episode 5)
- Kyusaku Shimada as Oosumi Kazuma (episodes 5–7, 9)

== Episodes ==
No.	Title	Directed by	Written by	Original release date	Rating
1	"The vengeful demon who threw away love – the grieving devil"	Arata Katō	Yōichi Maekawa	July 4, 2008	14.0%
2	"A treacherous snare... Parent and child torn apart"	Arata Katō	Yōichi Maekawa	July 11, 2008	12.6%
3	"One's true face is exposed, revenge for the sake of love"	Toshio Tsuboi	Yōichi Maekawa	July 18, 2008	9.2%
4	"Targeted devil, the gates of hell have opened"	Toshio Tsuboi	Masafumi Nishida	July 25, 2008	10.1%
5	"An advance murder notice...!? Receiving a red envelope from the devil"	Tsuyoshi Katayama	Masafumi Nishida	August 1, 2008	10.9%
6	"Tell me... who the real perpetrator is!!"	Arata Katō	Masafumi Nishida	August 8, 2008	7.6%
7	"The false siblings... A kind lie that invites death"	Toshio Tsuboi	Masafumi Nishida	August 15, 2008	12.1%
8	"The end to an impermissible love... For revenge, once more"	Tsuyoshi Katayama	Masafumi Nishida	August 22, 2008	11.5%
9	"I am the real perpetrator. The tragedy of a man who knew too much."	Arata Katō	Masafumi Nishida	August 29, 2008	11.5%
10	"The crumbling of a household... The last card is death!!"	Toshio Tsuboi	Masafumi Nishida	September 5, 2008	12.3%
11	"The final showdown. A bond severed by death!!"	Arata Katō	Masafumi Nishida	September 12, 2008	14.1%

== Awards ==
12th Nikkan Sports Drama Grand Prix (Summer)
Year	Recipient	Category	Result
2008	Maō	Excellence Award	Won
2008	Satoshi Ohno	Best Actor	Won
2008	Kei Tanaka	Best Supporting Actor	Won
2008	Ryoko Kobayashi	Best Supporting Actress	Won

12th Nikkan Sports Drama Grand Prix
Year	Recipient	Category	Result
2008	Maō	Best Drama	Won
2008	Satoshi Ohno	Best Actor	Won

5th TV Navi Drama Awards (July–September)
Year	Recipient	Category	Result
2008	Maō	Excellence Award	Won
2008	Satoshi Ohno	Best Actor	Won
2008	Kei Tanaka	Best Supporting Actor	Won
2008	Ryoko Kobayashi	Best Supporting Actress	Won

5th TV Navi Drama Awards
Year	Recipient	Category	Result
2009	Maō	Drama of the Year	Won
2009	Satoshi Ohno	Best Actor	Won

18th Annual TV Life Awards
Year	Recipient	Category	Result
2009	Maō	Best Drama	Won
2009	Satoshi Ohno	Best Actor	Won
2009	Arashi	Best Theme Song	Won
