= Satoshi Ohno =

Japanese idol, singer, actor

Satoshi Ohno 大野 智
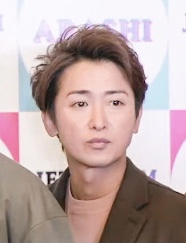
- Ohno in November 2019

Background information
- Born: November 26, 1980 (age 45)
- Origin: Mitaka, Tokyo, Japan
- Genre: J-pop
- Occupations: Singer; actor; radio host; dancer; choreographer
- Instrument: Vocals
- Years active: 1994–present
- Labels: Pony Canyon; J Storm
- Formerly of: Arashi
- Website: sato-jima.com

Satoshi Ohno (大野 智, Ōno Satoshi; born November 26, 1980) is a former Japanese idol, singer, actor, radio host, artist, dancer, and choreographer, registered under Johnny & Associates and later under Starto Entertainment. He was the lead vocalist and leader of the boy band Arashi, hence his nickname Leader (リーダー, Rīdā).

Ohno began his career in the entertainment industry when he joined the Japanese talent agency Johnny & Associates in 1994 at the age of 13. He started an acting career in 1997 when he was cast to be part of the stage play Kyo to Kyo. In 2008, Ohno became the first and the only artist from Johnny's to hold his own art exhibition, titled "Freestyle", and also received his first starring role in a Japanese television drama, Maō, for which he earned a handful of Best Actor awards. Since then, he continued to star in numerous dramas and movies, receiving a number of awards and nominations for his roles. For his work as an artist, a singer, and an actor in Kaibutsu-kun the Movie, Ohno became one of the recipients of GQ Japan's Men of the Year Award in 2011.

In February 2026, it was announced that, together with the end of activities of the group, Ohno would be leaving the agency on May 31, 2026.

In July 2026, Ohno appeared on a video reporting the opening of his official website and SNS.

== Early life ==
Ohno was born in Mitaka, Tokyo as the youngest child of his family. He has one older sister. During middle school, his mother sent in his application to Johnny & Associates without his knowledge. An invitation to audition was sent back to Ohno, and he subsequently became a trainee in October 1994. To focus on the stage play Kyo to Kyo, which ran from 1997 to 1998 during his trainee days, he withdrew from high school and moved to Kyoto.

== Career ==
Following Arashi's hiatus, Ohno had been absent from the public eye, except for a minimum of messages transmitted via the other members. In late April 2024, he provided an interview to a Post Seven reporter, in which he talked about meeting with the others at late night to talk, given the other's busy schedules. Among the things he talked about was Arashi's newly opened company and Ninomiya's independence from Smile-Up. He barely spoke about the hiatus and totally evaded the question of his commercial businesses opening around Miyakojima, Okinawa, including a hotel and a bar. Ohno has been investing in real estate since 2017, with plans to build a tourist resort. Of these, he said "I don't want to talk about it because it's private". He also talked about learning to drive. He said that it wasn't because of his needing to drive to Miyakojima, but because he felt it was time he learned, since, before, he had to rely on others to take him wherever he needed to go. About the return of activities as Arashi, Ohno said that nothing has been decided yet, not even a return concert that was rumored to be held in Spring next year.

On February 28, 2026, in a post by Starto Entertainment, it was announced that Ohno would leave the agency the same day of Arashi's end of activities, May 31, 2026. In a letter, also shared by Starto, Ohno thanks everyone involved during all the years of his career, including the members (of Arashi) and the fans, who have been supporting him since the beginning. He did not mention retiring from entertainment, but he did point out that after the last concert, he would like to do what he can at his own pace, being true to himself.

=== Music career ===
Before his music debut with Arashi, Ohno wanted to resign from Johnny & Associates. However, then-president Johnny Kitagawa asked him to help out with a song recording and to pack up for a trip to Hawaii, which turned out to be the place where the press conference announcing the formation of Arashi was held. With Ohno at the age of 18 at the time, Arashi was officially formed on September 15, 1999, and made their CD debut on November 3, 1999. Since much of his trainee days were spent in Kyoto, he was the least known member during Arashi's early days.

Ohno was the lead vocalist of Arashi. Although his music career is primarily with Arashi, he had a solo concert called 3104 (which can be read as his name Satoshi in Japanese) in 2006 and in 2009, became the first and only member in Arashi to release a solo single. It was a soundtrack for his drama Uta no Onii-san titled "Kumorinochi, Kaisei" (曇りのち、快晴) by Yano Kenta starring Satoshi Ohno. Ohno also provided the vocals to the insert song "Yukai Tsukai Kaibutsu-kun" (ユカイツーカイ怪物くん), which was released as a single on July 7, 2010, for the drama Kaibutsu-kun and sold around 59,000 copies on the first day.

==== Choreography ====
Ohno's work as a choreographer began in 2004 for his solo "Top Secret" during Arashi's 2004 Iza, Now Tour, and in 2006 for the group. Since then, he has done numerous solo and group dances, some of his notable group choreography including "Zero-G", the live performance for "Bittersweet", the interlude for the "Kokoro no Sora" music video, "Tsunagu", and "Do You...?".

Solo choreography
Year	Title
2004	"Top Secret"
2006	"Rain"
2007	"Song For Me"
2008	"Take Me Faraway"
2010	"Shizuka na Yoru ni"
2011	"Hung up on"
2012	"two"
2013	"Hit the floor"
2014	"Imaging Crazy"
2015	"Akatsuki"
2016	"Bad boy"

Group choreography
Year	Title
2006	"Ready to Fly"
2006	"Carnival Night Part 2"
2007	"Everybody Zenshin"
2007	"WAVE"
2011	"negai"
2012	"Tokei Jikake no Umbrella"
2012	"Up to You"
2012	"Cosmos"
2012	"Super Fresh"
2012	"Tsuite Oide"
2013	"Sayonara no Ato de"
2014	"Bittersweet" (live)
2014	"GUTS!" (chorus)
2014	"Zero-G"
2014	"TRAP"
2015	"Kokoro no Sora" (interlude)
2015	"Masquerade"
2016	"TWO TO TANGO"
2017	"Tsunagu"
2017	"Yoru no Kage"
2020	"Do You...?"

=== Acting career ===
==== Stage ====
In 1997, Ohno was a cast member of Kyo to Kyo with Musical Academy (MA) leader Shingo Machida and continued to act in other stage productions such as Koichi Dōmoto's Mask and Shōnentai's Playzone after Kyo to Kyo was over. Since then, he has done a number of stage plays such as True West with Masahiro Matsuoka and West Side Story with bandmates Sho Sakurai and Jun Matsumoto.

The Pū (プーシリーズ, Wind) series that Ohno starred in spanned from 2003 to 2008, consisting of Sengokupū (センゴクプー), Bakumatsu Banpū (バクマツバンプー), Tensei Kunpū (テンセイクンプー), and Amatsukaze (アマツカゼ). In Tensei Kunpū, Ohno portrayed a man named Kaoru Kazamine who was accidentally sent back to the Edo period of Japan through a system malfunction.

==== Drama ====
In 1999, Ohno made his TV drama debut in the volleyball-centered short drama V no Arashi (Vの嵐), which was Arashi's first drama together.

In 2008, Ohno was given his first starring role in the suspense drama Maō. He co-starred with Toma Ikuta and portrayed a two-faced lawyer who sought for revenge against the person who murdered his brother years ago.

In 2009, he starred in his first comedy drama Uta no Oniisan (歌のおにいさん, Brother of Songs). With Kanjani Eight member Ryuhei Maruyama as his co-star, Ohno played a musician who unexpectedly becomes a singing character for a children's program after being dumped by his girlfriend, kicked out of his band, and labelled useless by his family. Ohno also took part in a television mini-drama project titled 0 Gōshitsu no Kyaku (0号室の客, Guest in Room 0), which aired from October 2009 to April 2010 and starred a select number of different artists from Johnny's. Ohno was the lead actor in the first story of the project called "Akogare no Otoko" (憧れの男, Yearning Man), which ran for four episodes in total. The story was about a salaryman and a club hostess visiting a strange "Room 0" that can reveal anyone's "grade" as a human being.

In January 2010, Ohno co-starred with the other members of Arashi in the human suspense drama special Saigo no Yakusoku (最後の約束, Last Promise). Ohno portrayed Satoru Mashiko, a 28-year-old employee of a cleaning company who is caught up in a building hijack. Beginning in April 2010, Ohno starred in the live-action adaptation of the manga and anime Kaibutsu-kun. Ohno played Tarou Kaibutsu, the prince of Kaibutsu Land who is ordered by the king to go to the world of humans for training as he is deemed unfit for the succession of the throne. He then reprised his role of Kaibutsu-kun for the Kaibutsu-kun special which aired on June 26, 2010. Ohno also starred in the second story, Hajime no Ippo (はじめの一歩, First Step), of the Fall 2010 Yonimo Kimyōna Monogatari (世にも奇妙な物語) special that aired on October 4, 2010.

In October 2011, Ohno once again reprised his role of Kaibutsu-kun for another Kaibutsu-kun special, leading up to the story of the 3D movie version.

On January 3, 2012, Ohno starred in the drama special Mou Yuukai Nante Shinai (もう誘拐なんてしない, I Won't Kidnap Anymore). He played the role of Shotaro Tarui, a freeter who can't forget his childhood dream of being a hero. However, he finds himself planning a fake kidnapping after he receives a request from the daughter of a boss of racketeers, played by co-star Yui Aragaki. Beginning in April 2012, Ohno co-starred with Erika Toda in his first Getsuku drama, Kagi no Kakatta Heya (鍵のかかった部屋, Locked Room). He played the lead character, Kei Enomoto, an employee at a major security firm who has an obsession with keys and locks. Enomoto works with a pair of attorneys, solving mysteries that fall under the "locked room" genre, in which seemingly impossible crimes are committed.

On August 24, 2013, Ohno starred in the drama special Kyou no Hi wa Sayounara (今日の日はさようなら, Farewell for Today) which aired as part of the annual 24 Hour Television telethon in Japan. Ohno plays a 29-year-old man named Kouta who is diagnosed with malignant lymphoma. Given three months left to live, he makes a resolve to accept his fate and face death properly.

On January 3, 2014, Ohno reprised the role of Enomoto Kei for the Kagi no Kakatta Heya special. He also starred in the live-action adaptation of the manga Shinigami-kun beginning in April 2014. Ohno portrayed Shinigami-kun (Shinigami No.413) whose job is to pronounce death to expected people and take their souls to the spiritual world. As a rookie reaper, he tends to make biased decisions towards the human side which always causes him to be reprimanded by his boss.

Beginning in April 2016, Ohno starred in a drama titled Sekai Ichi Muzukashii Koi (世界一難しい恋, The World's Most Difficult Love). Ohno played Reiji Samejima, a company president in the hotel industry. Despite his success at work, he knows little about love. This romantic comedy follows Samejima as he pursues Misaki Shibayama, his very first love interest.

==== Film ====
In 2002, Ohno made his motion picture debut in Arashi's first movie together, Pikanchi Life Is Hard Dakedo Happy (ピカ☆ンチ Life is Hard だけど Happy, Pikanchi Life is Hard But Happy). He portrayed Haru, a bizarre high school student who gets swindled during his trip to Harajuku. Two years later in 2004, Ohno reprised his role for the sequel Pikanchi Life Is Hard Dakara Happy (ピカ☆☆ンチ Life is Hard だから Happy, Pikanchi Life is Hard Therefore Happy). Ohno reprised his role as Haru once again in 2014 in a spin-off of the two previous films, titled Pikanchi Life Is Hard Tabun Happy (ピカ☆★☆ンチ Life is Hard たぶん Happy, Pikanchi Life is Hard Maybe Happy).

In 2007, the group came together once again to act in their third movie together, Kiiroi Namida (黄色い涙, Yellow Tears), with Ohno acting as an oil painter.

In 2011, Ohno returned to the big screen starring as the lead actor in the film Kaibutsu-kun the Movie. His character, Tarou Kaibutsu, is about to be crowned king, but is met with unexpected booing. Trying to escape to the human world, Tarou and his three henchmen accidentally find themselves in a place known as the Curry Kingdom where he is mistaken as a legendary hero. The cast went overseas to India to shoot parts of the film. He became the first member in Arashi to star in a 3D film.

In May 2016 it was announced that Ohno would star as the lead actor in the summer 2017 film Mumon: The Land of Stealth (忍びの国). The film illustrates the epic battle between the Oda clan and the Iga ninja. Ohno plays Mumon, an Iga ninja renowned to be a deadly assassin with unmatched battle strength, but who is also equally lazy and only seeks to earn money to make his wife, Okuni, happy. In preparation for the film, Ohno underwent intensive training in sword fighting.

== Other ventures ==
=== Radio ===
Ohno had his own radio show called Arashi Discovery, which aired every weekday from Monday to Friday on FM Yokohama from October 1, 2002, to March 31, 2017.

=== Art ===
When Ohno was in the third grade, he was inspired by his classmate's Dragon Ball illustration to start drawing. Since then, he has been drawing his own artwork and making original figurines. In the November 3, 2025 live stream the group had for their fan club, celebrating their 26th anniversary, Ohno revealed that he had begun using an iPad to draw.

In 2008, he held an art exhibition called Freestyle, making him the first artist in Johnny's to hold one. In 2015, it was announced that Ohno would be holding a second art exhibition called Freestyle II in Tokyo from July 24 to August 23. In addition, Ohno held an art exhibition the same year in Shanghai from July 9 to 29, showcasing artwork from his first art exhibition, Freestyle. A new version of Freestyle, called Freestyle 2020 opened on September 9, 2020, and had pieces from his previous exhibitions, as well as new ones, including the cover art for Arashi's single "Kite".

As of 2019, Ohno has designed the charity T-shirt for NTV's 24-hour television telethon four times, making him the first artist to do so. He was in charge of designing the T-shirt for the first time in 2004. In 2012, Ohno collaborated with Japanese artist Yoshitomo Nara and their design sold 764,198 copies, setting a new record. In the following year, Ohno collaborated with Japanese artist Yayoi Kusama to design the T-shirt for that year's telethon. It sold 1,244,469 copies, making it the most successful in the history of the telethon. 2019 was the 2nd time he designed it by himself (各回の色とデザイン). He also designed the flower pattern of a jacket Arashi wore in the "Arafes 2020" concert.

Ohno's art was displayed in Japan Airlines "JAL Fly to 2020" Olympic campaign in 2015, as part of the design on the planes. Under the theme of "Hope for the future", the aircraft shows colorful flowers, Mt. Fuji, the four seasons, and people looking into the future, with Arashi's faces in the center of the design, under a five member-colored rainbow. JAL's Fly to 2020 aircraft operated from 27 June 2015 until 10 April 2016.

Because of his talent in the field of art, Ohno was appointed to host a four episode documentary for NHK entitled "Jakuchu Miracle World" starting on April 25, 2011. The documentary focused on analyzing artwork by a famous Edo era artist named Itō Jakuchū. On August 22, 2012, Ohno hosted another documentary for NHK entitled "Everything Is for the Sake Of Delivering Dreams ~Walt Disney Trajectory of Creation~". In commemoration of Walt Disney's 110th anniversary, the documentary explored and revealed the secrets behind the origins and processes of Disney's creations.

== SNS and official website opening ==
On July 3, 2026, Ohno appeared on a video shared on X and Instagram, mentioning the opening of a website on the 15, as well as mentioning the social media and inviting everyone to follow and visit, as he plans to update it with his activities and hobbies and future information on events to be held by him. Both media accounts as well as the website are under the name "Satojima", a sort of abbreviation for "Satoshi's Island" (さとしの島, Satoshi no shima). The website shows a countdown counting the days until its official opening.

== Commercials ==
大野智#CM

- Kentucky Fried Chicken Japan
  - Red Hot Chicken (2010–2011)
  - Habanero Boneless (2010)
  - Jalapeño Boneless (2011)
- Kracie Home Products (ja) "Naive" (ja) brand skin care
- Morinaga Confectionaries and Health Foods Industry
  - Morinaga small chocolate biscuit (October 2011-March 2014)
  - Bake creamy <melting cheese brulee> (October 2012-March 2014)
  - Baked chocolate "Bake" series (April 2014-May 2016)
  - Morinaga Milk Cocoa (October 2014-September 2016)
- Lawson
  - Onigiri-ya (November 2012-May 2015)
  - Handmade pasta (October 2014-May 2015)
  - Golden chicken umami salt (October 2014-May 2015)
- Hisamitsu Pharmaceutical Allegra FX (ja) (January 2013- )
- Kirin Company, Ltd.
  - Kirin Beverages Company, Ltd.
    - "Mets Cola", with Masaki Aiba (December 2013-February 2016)
    - "Mets", with Masaki Aiba and Jun Matsumoto (March 2016-November 2016)
- Ajinomoto
  - J-Oil Mills' Ajinomoto extra virgin olive oil (February 2017- )
- McDonald's Japan (September 2019-December 2019)
- Asahi Group Holdings, Ltd.
  - Asahi Soft Drinks "Mitsuya Cider" (2020) with Arashi as a group, including a video of Sho Sakurai with audio from him

== Discography ==
=== Singles ===
Title	Year	Peak		RIAJ certifications (sales thresholds)	Album
Title	Year	JPN	JPN Hot	RIAJ certifications (sales thresholds)	Album
"Kumorinochi, Kaisei" (Note: The song was released as a double A-side single with Arashi's "Believe" song and under the name Yano Kenta starring Satoshi Ohno.)	2009	1	2	2× Platinum	All the Best! 1999–2009
"Yukai Tsukai Kaibutsu-kun"	2010	2	2	Gold	Non-album single

=== Other charted songs ===
Title	Year	Peak	Album
Title	Year	JPN DL	Album
"Rain"	2005	39	One
"Shizuka na Yoru ni"	2010	63	Boku no Miteiru Fūkei
"Two"	2012	68	Popcorn
"Hit the Floor"	2013	40	Love
"Imaging Crazy"	2014	99	The Digitalian
"Akatsuki"	2015	50	Japonism
"Bad Boy"	2016	96	Are You Happy?

=== Musical contributions ===
Are You Happy? song "Miles Away" (recording under Ohno's supervision)

== Publications ==
- Freestyle (published on February 8, 2008, by M.Co.)
- Freestyle II (published on July 24, 2015, by M.Co.)
- Freestyle 2020 (published on September 20, 2020, by M.Co.)

== Filmography ==
=== TV dramas ===
Year	Title	Role	Notes
1999	V no Arashi	Satoshi Ohno	Lead role with Arashi members
2000	Shijō Saiaku no Dēto	Tatsuya Kudo	Episode: "Akuma no Christmas☆Kiss
2001	Speed Star	Hiroshi Sakurai	TV special
2002	Shōnen Taiya: "Aoki-san Uchi no Oku-san"	Satoshi	Lead role, mini-drama, with fellow Arashi members Sho Sakurai and Masaki Aiba
2003	Engimono	Mitsuo	Lead role, mini-drama, "Mitsuo"
2003	Yoiko no Mikata	Claim Agent Arashi	Episode 8 guest appearance
2004	Yon-bun no Ichi no Kizuna	Naoya Suzuki	TV special
2004	Gekidan Engimono	Junji Okinojima	Lead role, mini-drama, "Katte ni Nosutarujii"
2007	Yamada Tarō Monogatari	Villa Kubari no Oniisan	Episode 10 guest appearance
2008	Maō	Ryo Naruse	Lead role with Toma Ikuta
2009	Uta no Oniisan	Kenta Yano	Lead role
2009	0 Gōshitsu no Kyaku	Hiroyuki Matsuda	Lead role of first four episodes, "Akogare no Otoko"
2010	Saigo no Yakusoku	Satoru Mashiko	Lead role with other members of Arashi, television special
2010	Tokujo Kabachi!!	Shūhei Honda	Episode 10 guest appearance
2010	Kaibutsu-kun	Kaibutsu Tarou	Lead role
2010	Mō Kaette Kita Yo!! Kaibutsu-kun Subete Shinsaku Special	Kaibutsu Tarou	Lead role, television special
2010	Yonimo Kimyōna Monogatari: Hajime no Ippo	Hajime Shinozaki	Lead role, television special
2011	Kaibutsu-kun Shinsaku SP	Kaibutsu Tarou	Lead role
2012	Mou Yuukai Nante Shinai	Shotaro Tarui	Lead role
2012	Kagi no Kakatta Heya	Kei Enomoto	Lead role
2012	Papadol!	Satoshi Ohno	Episode 1 guest appearance
2013	Kyou no Hi wa Sayounara	Kouta Fujioka	Lead role, 24 Hour TV special
2014	Kagi no Kakatta Heya SP	Kei Enomoto	Lead role
2014	Shinigami-kun	Shinigami No. 413	Lead role
2016	Sekai Ichi Muzukashii Koi	Reiji Samejima	Lead role

=== Films ===
Year	Title	Role	Notes
2002	Pikanchi Life Is Hard Dakedo Happy	Haruhiko Kida (Haru)	Supporting role
2004	Pikanchi Life Is Hard Dakara Happy	Haruhiko Kida (Haru)	Lead role
2007	Kiiroi Namida	Kei Shimokawa	Lead role with Arashi members
2011	Kaibutsu-kun the Movie	Kaibutsu-kun	Lead role
2014	Pikanchi Life Is Hard Tabun Happy	Haruhiko Kida (Haru)	Lead role with Arashi members
2017	Mumon: The Land of Stealth	Mumon	Lead role

=== Documentaries ===
- Jakuchu Miracle World (NHK, 2011, navigator)
- Subete wa yume o todokeru tame ni ~ Walt Disney sōzō no kiseki ~ (NHK, 2012, navigator)

== Stage ==
Year	Title	Role	Notes
1997	Kyo to Kyo	Ushiwakamaru	
1997	Show Geki '97 Mask		
1998	Kyo to Kyo	Ushiwakamaru	
1999	Show Geki '99 Mask		
1999	Shōnentai Musical Playzone’99: Goodbye and Hello		
2001	Shōnentai Musical Playzone 2001 "Shinseiki" Emotion	Kare	
2003	Sengokupū	Fūsuke	Lead role
2004	True West	Austin	Lead role with Masahiro Matsuoka
2004	West Side Story	Riff	Supporting role
2005	Bakumatsu Banpū	Sōji Okita	Lead role
2006	Tensei Kunpū	Kaoru Kazamine	Lead role
2008	Amatsukaze	Nagi	Lead role

== Awards and nominations ==
Year	Organization	Award	Work	Result
2008	12th Nikkan Sports Drama Grand Prix (Summer)	Best Actor	Maō	Won
2008	58th Television Drama Academy Awards	Best Actor	Maō	Nominated
2008	12th Nikkan Sports Annual Drama Grand Prix	Best Actor	Maō	Won
2008	5th Annual TV Navi Drama Awards (July–September)	Best Actor	Maō	Won
2009	5th Annual TV Navi Drama Awards	Best Actor	Maō	Won
2009	18th Annual TV Life Awards	Best Actor	Maō	Won
2009	60th Television Drama Academy Awards	Best Actor	Uta no Oniisan	Nominated
2009	60th Television Drama Academy Awards	Best Theme Song	Uta no Oniisan	Won
2010	14th Nikkan Sports Drama Grand Prix (Spring)	Best Actor	Kaibutsu-kun	Won
2010	65th Television Drama Academy Awards	Best Actor	Kaibutsu-kun	Won
2010	6th Annual TV Navi Drama Awards (April–June)	Best Actor	Kaibutsu-kun	Won
2010	20th Annual TV Life Awards	Best Actor	Kaibutsu-kun	Won
2011	GQ Japan Men of the Year 2011 Awards	GQ Men of the Year 2011 (Note: Ohno was one of the five honorees for GQ Men of the Year 2011)		Won
2012	16th Nikkan Sports Drama Grand Prix (Spring)	Best Actor	Kagi no Kakatta Heya	Won
2012	73rd Television Drama Academy Awards	Best Actor	Kagi no Kakatta Heya	Won
2012	9th Annual TV Navi Drama Awards (April–June)	Best Actor	Kagi no Kakatta Heya	Won
2013	22nd Annual TV Life Awards	Best Actor	Kagi no Kakatta Heya	Won
2013	9th Annual TV Navi Drama Awards	Best Actor	Kagi no Kakatta Heya	Won
2013	16th Nikkan Sports Annual Drama Grand Prix	Best Actor	Kagi no Kakatta Heya	Won
2014	18th Nikkan Sports Drama Grand Prix (Spring)	Best Actor	Shinigami-kun	Won
2014	11th Annual TV Navi Drama Awards (April–June)	Best Actor	Shinigami-kun	Won
2015	24th Annual TV Life Awards	Best Actor	Shinigami-kun	Won
2016	20th Nikkan Sports Drama Grand Prix (Spring)	Best Actor	Sekai Ichi Muzukashii Koi	Won
2016	89th Television Drama Academy Awards	Best Actor	Sekai Ichi Muzukashii Koi	Won
2017	26th Annual TV Life Awards	Best Actor	Sekai Ichi Muzukashii Koi	Won
2017	20th Nikkan Sports Annual Drama Grand Prix	Best Actor	Sekai Ichi Muzukashii Koi	Won
2017	42nd Hochi Film Awards	Best Actor	Mumon: The Land of Stealth	Nominated
