= Sekai Ichi Muzukashii Koi =

- Promotional poster
- 世界一難しい恋
- Genre: Romance; Comedy
- Written by: Shigeki Kaneko
- Directed by: Satoru Nakajima; Shintaro Sugawara
- Starring: Satoshi Ohno; Haru
- Ending theme: "I Seek" by Arashi
- Country of origin: Japan
- Original language: Japanese
- No. of episodes: 10

Production
- Executive producer: Itaru Matsuoka

Original release
- Network: Nippon TV
- Release: 13 April – 15 June 2016

Sekai Ichi Muzukashii Koi (世界一難しい恋; transl. The World's Most Difficult Love) is a 2016 Japanese television drama series broadcast by Nippon TV. It received a viewership rating of 12.9% on average.

== Plot ==
34-year old Reiji Samejima is the successor of a traditional Japanese inn and a company president who has expanded the business into the hotel industry. Despite his good appearance and wealth, women eventually leave him because of his arrogant and childish personality. He is generous with himself, but strict with others. For the first time, Reiji falls in love with someone. Her name is Misaki Shibayama, an outspoken employee at Samejima Hotels who is not afraid to say what's on her mind. He begins to change as he pursues her with numerous romantic tactics over the course of the story with the help of his secretary Maiko Muraoki and chauffeur Katsunori Ishigami, hoping to eventually gain her love.

== Cast ==
- Satoshi Ohno as Reiji Samejima
- Haru as Misaki Shibayama
- Eiko Koike as Maiko Muraoki
- Kazuki Kitamura as Hideo Wada
- Tetta Sugimoto as Katsunori Ishigami
- Fumika Shimizu as Mahiro Hori
- Nozomu Kotaki as Ieyasu Miura
- Hiroki Miyake as Shizuo Otonashi
- Tomomi Maruyama as Goro Shirahama
- Kota Fudauchi as Sasahiro Matsukawa
- Makoto Wakabayashi as Jun Maruto
- Ryo Nishihiro as Taiyo Hiruma

== Episodes ==
No.	Title	Original release date	Ratings
1	"恋愛偏差値最低のセレブ社長が一目惚れ！優しい嘘で彼女にプロポーズ"	13 April 2016	12.8%
2	"ひねくれ社長の初恋は難関続出…目指せ器の大きい男！犬の散歩で求愛"	20 April 2016	12.9%
3	"ひねくれ社長が新人に恥ずかしすぎる告白 恋愛スイッチオンの秘策とは"	27 April 2016	13.1%
4	"恋愛師匠の必勝指令で一泊旅行…遂に愛の告白でアタマ真っ白"	4 May 2016	12.2%
5	"遂にカップルへ!?恋愛スキル総動員で待ちわびる最終回答"	11 May 2016	11.5%
6	"初恋成就でバカップル誕生！悲劇のダンスパーティ…真夜中に通じる心"	18 May 2016	11.7%
7	"お泊まりデート最高のキス!?純情オトコ心で破局の大ピンチ"	25 May 2016	13.0%
8	"新たな恋は足裏上手安らぎ秘書？ダメ親父教えるまごころ"	1 June 2016	12.1%
9	"諦め切れない恋と夢…偶然再会で最高のプロポーズ"	8 June 2016	13.0%
10	"最終回驚きの展開！結婚できる？あせる社長最後の危機"	16 June 2016	16.0%
