= Kagi no Kakatta Heya =

- Promotional poster
- 鍵のかかった部屋
- Genre: Locked-room mystery
- Created by: Yusuke Kishi
- Written by: Tomoko Aizawa; Michitaka Okada; Kosuke Nishi
- Directed by: Hiroaki Matsuyama; Hiromasa Kato; Yusuke Ishii; Hiro Kanai
- Starring: Satoshi Ohno; Erika Toda; Koichi Sato
- Opening theme: "PINK KILLS" by Ken Arai
- Ending theme: "Face Down" by Arashi
- Composer: Mark Todd
- Country of origin: Japan
- Original language: Japanese
- No. of episodes: 11

Production
- Executive producer: Ichiryu Obara
- Production companies: Grindstone Entertainment Group; Emmett/Furla Oasis; Garlin Pictures; Pacific View Management

Original release
- Network: Fuji Television
- Release: 16 April – 25 June 2012

Kagi no Kakatta Heya (鍵のかかった部屋, Locked Room) is a 2012 Japanese Getsuku television drama series distributed by Universal Pictures under the locked-room mystery genre broadcast by Fuji Television from April 16 to June 25, 2012. It is based on the Kei Enomoto novel series by Yusuke Kishi titled The Glass Hammer (硝子のハンマー), The House of Will-o'-the-Wisp (狐火の家), and The Locked Room Murders (鍵のかかった部屋). The drama stars Satoshi Ohno, Erika Toda, and Koichi Sato, and received a viewership rating of 16.0% on average. A drama special was later aired on January 3, 2014, which received a viewership rating of 15.9%.

== Plot ==
Kei Enomoto works for a Tokyo-based security company. Enomoto is not an easy person to familiarise oneself with, always calm, quiet, and unapproachable, with a past that is unknown to others. Considered a maniac in Physics, Science, and Architecture, he is certain of the fact that there is no lock that cannot be broken. One day, Enomoto is approached by attorney Junko Aoto, who asks Enomoto to help reveal a mystery behind a locked room murder. Possessing a vast amount of knowledge, Enomoto works side by side with Aoto and her senior attorney in the law firm, Gou Serizawa. Aoto is pure and acts upon her instincts, whereas Serizawa is a prideful elitist who sees time as money and will not take on any job that is not profitable. As the story unfolds, the three work closely together to solve locked room mysteries one after another.

== Cast ==
=== Main cast ===
- Satoshi Ohno as Kei Enomoto
- Erika Toda as Junko Aoto
- Koichi Sato as Gou Serizawa
- Rena Nōnen as Rina Mizuki (ep.1-9,11)
- Atom Shukugawa as Tachigawa (ep.1,4,10)
- Takashi Ukaji as Mitsuo Kono (ep.3,5,10-11)

=== Additional cast members ===
- Keisuke Horibe as Masatomo Kusakabe (ep.1)
- Morio Kazama as Seiichi Ikehata (ep.1)
- Akira Hamada as Maruyama (ep.1)
- Atsuko Anami as Fumiko Tashiro (ep.1)
- Tatsuo Nadaka as Odaka (ep.1)
- Ryunosuke Hashino as Daiki Matsuda (ep.1)
- Ken Maeda as Kawasaki (ep.1)
- Shido Nakamura as Aiichirou Aida (ep.2)
- Masahiro Takashima as Yoshio Takazawa (ep.2)
- Mayuko Fukuda as Miki Takazawa (ep.2)
- Momoka Yamada as Miki Takazawa (child) (ep.2)
- Soutarou Wada as Hiroki Takazawa (ep.2)
- Atsuki Ishii as Hiroki Takazawa (child) (ep.2)
- Hiroki Machida as student (ep.2)
- Saki Aibu as Nahoko Kurusu (ep.3)
- Shugo Oshinari as Shiyuuya Nakano (ep.3)
- Rio Yamashita as Mari Inagaki (ep.3)
- Masaru Hotta as (ep.3)
- Miho Shiraishi as Mika Kuwashima (ep.4)
- Satoru Matsuo as Toshiki Furumizo (ep.4)
- Reina Asami as Yaguchi (ep.4)
- Kazuko Kato as Etsuko Kuwashima (ep.4)
- Koichiro Kanzaki (ep.4)
- Hirofumi Arai as Shunji Sugisaki (ep.5)
- Megumi Seki as Kana Iikura (ep.5)
- Ayaka Komatsu as Misato Saito (ep.5)
- Keiko Horiuchi as Nao Hatakeyama (ep.6)
- Akito Kiriyama as Yuki Ioka(ep.6)
- So Yamanaka as Yakushiji (ep.6)
- Kotaro Yoshida as Masayuki Nishino(ep.7)
- Mitsuru Hirata as Haruhiko Endo (ep.7)
- Tomohiro Kaku as Takeru Nishino (ep.7)
- Ei Morisako as Manami Nishino (ep.7)
- Kokoa Ishii as Asuka Nishino (ep.7)
- Megumi as Rikako Anzai (ep.8)
- Mayuko Iwasa as Asami Tachibana (ep.8)
- Mirai Shida as Tomoko Nakata (ep.8)
- Atsuwo Ohuchi as reporter (ep.8)
- Sho Aikawa as Jiro Nonogaki (ep.9)
- Koh Takasugi as Kenya Sakaguchi (ep.9)
- Ryohei Suzuki as Mitsuo Hatta (ep.9)
- Yuki Sato as Katsumi Inuyama (ep.9)
- Hajime Inoue as Masashi Okasaki (ep.9)
- Rina Hatakeyama as Misa Hatta (ep.9)
- Ryo Iwamatsu as Koutatsu Togashi (ep.9)
- Yutaka Kato as security guard (ep.10)
- Hiroshi Tamaki as Manabu Satou (ep.10-11)
- Kazuma Suzuki as Masaki Ebara (ep.10-11)
- Shinsho Nakamaru as Tokuji Hisanaga (ep.10-11)
- Katsuhiko Sasaki as Shozo Ebara (ep.10-11)
- Mayuko Nishiyama as Hiromi Itou (ep.10-11)
- Tsubasa Honda as Shinobu Kawamura (ep.10-11)
- Daikichi Sugawara as Shinichi Iwakiri (ep.10-11)
- Yasuto Kosuda as Osamu Anyouji (ep.10-11)
- Tomomi Maruyama as Detective Manda (ep.10-11)

== Episodes ==
No.	Title	Original release date	Ratings
1	"The Standing Man"	April 16, 2012	18.3%
2	"The Locked Room"	April 23, 2012	16.5%
3	"The Labyrinth of the Board Edge"	April 30, 2012	14.4%
4	"Black Fang"	May 7, 2012	15.5%
5	"The Room That Wasn't Locked"	May 14, 2012	15.6%
6	"Locked Room Theater"	May 21, 2012	15.4%
7	"The House of Will-o'-the-Wisp"	May 28, 2012	16.1%
8	"Only the Dog Knows"	June 4, 2012	15.4%
9	"The Deceived Man"	June 11, 2012	16.0%
10	"The Glass Hammer (Part 1)"	June 18, 2012	13.8%
11	"The Glass Hammer (Part 2)"	June 25, 2012	17.5%
