= Shinigami-kun =

- Genre: Supernatural; Drama
- Based on: Shinigami-kun by Koichi Endo
- Written by: Hiroshi Hashimoto
- Starring: Satoshi Ohno; Mirei Kiritani; Masaki Suda; Yutaka Matsushige
- Ending theme: "Daremo Shiranai" by Arashi
- Country of origin: Japan
- Original language: Japanese
- No. of series: 1
- No. of episodes: 9

Production
- Producers: Sō Īda; Kimiko Nishikawa; Jun Shimoyama

Original release
- Network: TV Asahi
- Release: 18 April – 20 June 2014

Shinigami-kun (死神くん) is a Japanese television drama series based on the manga of the same name by Koichi Endo. The screenwriter is Hiroshi Hashimoto who is known for Thermae Romae 2 (2014) and Flying Colors (2015). Satoshi Ohno, who is a member of the Japanese idol group Arashi, played the lead role. Mirei Kiritani also appeared in a supporting role. It received an average viewership rating of 9.7%.

== Plot ==
Shinigami-kun, also known as Shinigami-kun #413, is a rookie grim reaper whose job is to inform people of their impending death and to bring their souls to the spirit world upon their death. He appears with his signature phrase "Congratulations! I'm here to call on you." However, because he is a rookie reaper, he has a tendency to make biased decisions toward the human side, breaking the rule of his world and causing him to get reprimanded by his superior.

== Cast ==
=== Main cast ===
- Satoshi Ohno as Shinigami-kun (the reaper)
- Mirei Kiritani as Kanshi-kan (death watcher)
- Masaki Suda as Akuma (devil)
- Yutaka Matsushige as Shunin (supervisor)

=== Guest appearances ===
- Riho Takada as Mami Kobayashi (ep.1)
- Shu Watanabe as Naoyuki Sanjō (ep.1)
- Kei Yamamoto as Tomekichi Satō (ep.5)
- Yu Takahashi as Sayaka Kirino (ep.6)
- Tetsuko Kuroyanagi (ep.7)
- Noriko Nakagoshi as Miho Uchida (ep.8)

== Episodes ==
| No. | Title | Directed by | Original release date | Ratings (%) |
|---|---|---|---|---|
| 1 | "心美人お迎えに参りました!あなたの命はあと3日 最期は僕が傍にいる" | Hideo Nakata | 18 April 2014 | 11.2% |
| 2 | "悪魔誕生 デスノートで上司のいじめに復讐する男!?" | Jōta Tsunehiro | 25 April 2014 | 10.1% |
| 3 | "あの海へ 余命2日の令嬢と愛の逃避行〜死神VS悪魔" | Masaya Kakehi | 2 May 2014 | 9.9% |
| 4 | "神の選択 密室火災…取り残された5人の運命は!?" | Keita Motohashi | 9 May 2014 | 10.3% |
| 5 | "老夫婦の幸せ ～オレオレ詐欺の孫に悪魔が囁く…!!" | Hideo Nakata | 23 May 2014 | 9.4% |
| 6 | "だまされ上手!? ～結婚詐欺師に1000万貢ぐいい女" | Jōta Tsunehiro | 30 May 2014 | 9.7% |
| 7 | "芸能界の女帝バトル…!? 栄光の人気歌手の最期の歌" | Masaya Kakehi | 6 June 2014 | 8.9% |
| 8 | "最終章!! ピーマンと僕の生きる道" | Keita Motohashi | 13 June 2014 | 8.4% |
| 9 | "さらば優しい死神!! 最期は僕の傍にいて" | Keita Motohashi | 20 June 2014 | 9.6% |

| Preceded by Watashi no Kiraina Tantei (17 January 2014 - 7 March 2014) | TV Asahi Friday Night Dramas; Fridays 23:15 - 24:15 (JST) | Succeeded by Tokumei Tantei Season 2 (4 July 2014 - 5 September 2014) |
