= Tenmongata =

Japanese research institute

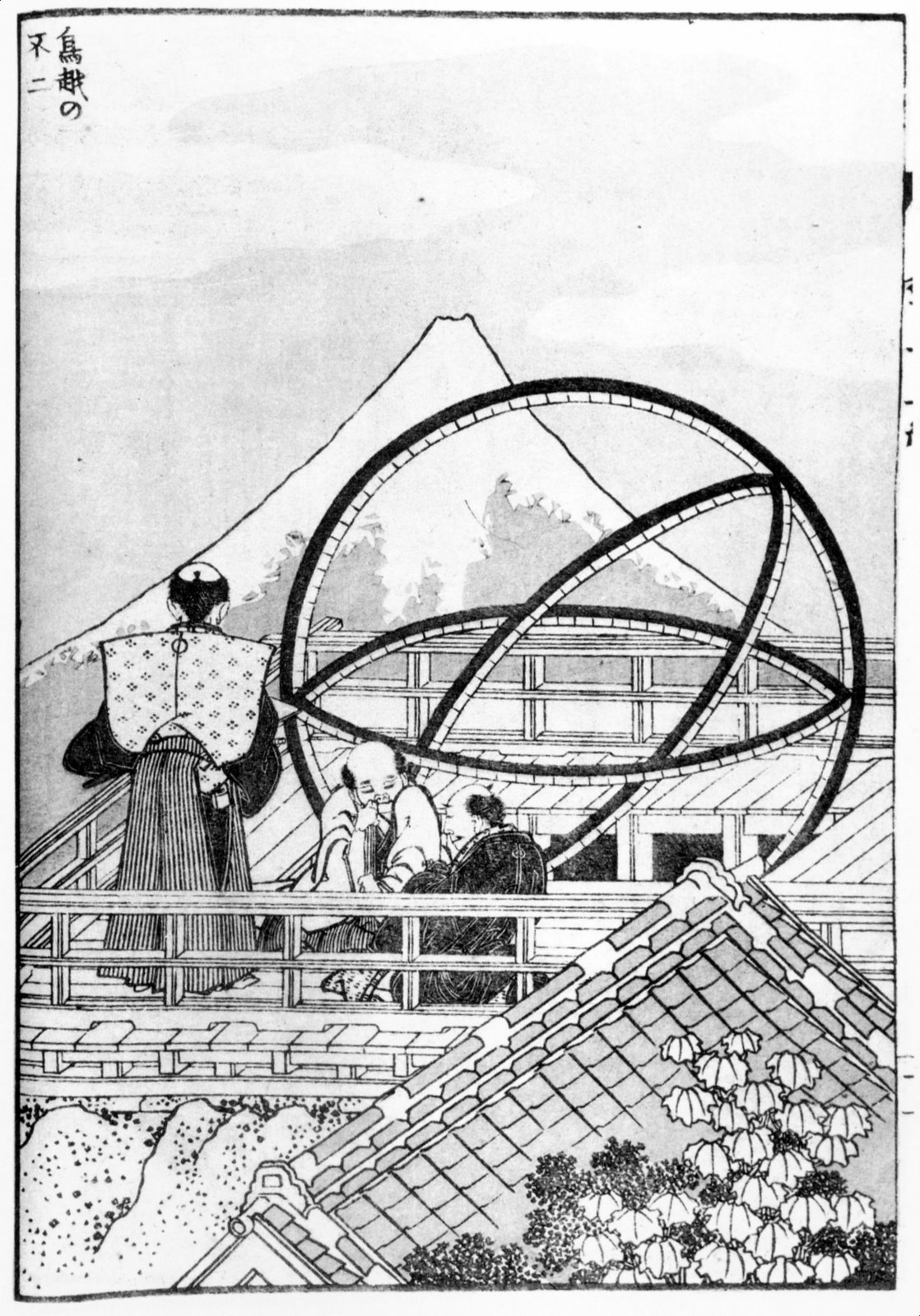
Asakusa Observatory of Tenmongata by Hokusai

The Tenmongata (天文方, Astronomy Agency) was an institute for astronomical studies operated by the Tokugawa shogunate in Edo, Japan (today's Tokyo). It is one of the predecessors of today's University of Tokyo.

== Overview ==
Traditionally, astronomical studies and revision of the calendar were carried out by the Onmyo-no-tsukasa (陰陽寮), which was established by Emperor Tenmu in the 7th century. The institute was established in 1684 when the Tokugawa Shogunate decided to switch from the Senmyō calendar, which had been in use for 823 years and had thus accumulated significant errors, to the newly invented Jōkyō calendar. The inventor of the calendar, Harumi Shibukawa, was appointed as the head of the institute.

The institute was also responsible for surveying, chorography, and translating European academic books and papers. The translation department (蛮書和解御用, Bansho Wagegoyo) eventually spun off to form the Bansho Shirabesho, one of the predecessors of humanities studies at the University of Tokyo.

The first modern map of Japan by Ino and Takahashi

The eighth shogun Yoshimune invested heavily in this institute to absorb European modern natural science, resulting in an accumulation of distinguished scholars, imported materials and equipments. The Kansei Calendar was developed by Yoshitoki Takahashi in 1798, which took into account the elliptical orbits of the sun and moon. His student Tadataka Ino and he completed the first comprehensive modern map of Japan in 1821.

The office of chief astronomer was officially hereditary, but often, outstanding astronomers were adopted, making it meritocratic in practice.

After the Meiji Restoration, it became one of the direct predecessors of sciences studies at the University of Tokyo.
