= Junichi Okada =

Japanese actor and singer (born 1980)

- 岡田 准一
- Okada at the 39th Tokyo International Film Festival in 2026
- Born: November 18, 1980 (age 45); Hirakata, Osaka, Japan
- Occupations: Singer; actor; martial artist; fight choreographer
- Years active: 1995–present
- Spouse: Aoi Miyazaki (m. 2017)
- Children: 4
- Musical career
- Genres: J-pop; hip hop
- Label: Avex Trax
- Formerly of: V6

Junichi Okada (岡田 准一, Okada Jun'ichi; born November 18, 1980) is an actor, fight choreographer and a former member of Japanese boy band V6, under the extinct Johnny & Associates.

== Early life ==
Okada and his sister were raised by their mother, a piano teacher, after their parents divorce, when he was in second grade in Elementary School. Since she gave classes until late at night, Okada felt lonely. He continued searching for a father-figure in all around him. When he turned 14, his mother told him, "I don't intend to rely on you for my care when I get older. So you too should become a man who can survive on your own." Growing up in a fatherless household, her words resonated deeply with him, and, in the summer of his third year of junior high school, in 1995, they were put to the test. Thanks to his mother, Okada participated in Johnny's Pre-School, part of the NTV program Tensai, Takeshi no Genki ga Deru Terebi (天才・たけしの元気が出るテレビ!!).

== Career ==
On October 2, 2023, it was announced that Okada would be leaving Johnny's on November 30.

=== Music career ===
Okada, who was now living on his own in Tokyo, three months after the audition for the program that got him in Johnny & Associates at the age of 14, was chosen by Johnny Kitagawa, adding him to the soon–to–become idol group V6, of which he would be the youngest member. Unlike the rest of the members in the group, he did not have much experience as a Johnny's Jr., and the feeling he could not advance, even with the help of the others, frustrated him. The first time that he had been on a music program was after the debut of V6. Their debut song was "Music For the People".

Okada can play the guitar, as well as the piano. His voice is in the middle range. His solos usually included slower ballads. Later in his career as member of V6, he was given longer solo songs, such as "Way of Life". He also revealed that during V6's 2008 concert Vibes, he was directing most of the lightning, staging, and costumes.

=== Acting career ===
==== Dramas ====
In a Shounen Club Premium interview on May 7, 2009, he said that the Japanese drama Kisarazu Cat's Eye caught the attention of viewers and directors, and made them aware of his acting ability. The success of the drama led to the making of two movie sequels, Kisarazu Cat's Eye: Nihon Series and Kisarazu Cat's Eye: World Series. His other notable dramas include Tiger & Dragon, a comedy drama about rakugo, a form of Japanese comedy acted only by one person telling that story. and SP (also known as Security Police), an action suspense drama about a team of security police bodyguards in charge of protecting important people in the government. With Shinichi Tsutsumi as his co-star, the drama drew in overall ratings of 15.35% despite its Saturday 11:00 p.m. (JST) time slot; its special episode broadcast in 2008 also received a viewership rating of 21.5%.

After several years of "drama hiatus", Okada played the main character, Kuroda Kanbei, in the January 2014 NHK historical drama, Gunshi Kanbei (軍師官兵衛). Kanbei was a man of ambition who served as the chief strategist under Toyotomi Hideyoshi in the Sengoku period.

==== Movies ====
He made a big leap in his movie career with Tokyo Tower in 2005. In the movie he portrayed a young college student torn between his love for a lady twenty years his senior and the views society has on these kinds of relationship. After that came Hana, directed by Hirokazu Kore-eda. In the movie, Okada portrayed Sōza, a samurai uninterested in killing his enemy and focused on what he could do today to be a better person instead. The movie earned him a nomination for the Blue Ribbon Awards, but he declined this nomination. Nevertheless, he was awarded the Ishihara Yujiro New Actor Award at Nikkan Sports Film Award for his role in Hana. Later, he was involved in movies such as Flowers in the Shadows, portraying a young man in debt because of pachinko, and Otonari (おとなり), an unconventional love story between two neighbors who have never met each other and only follow the other person's life through the sounds they hear from the other side of the wall.

In 2012, Okada played the role of Shibukawa Shunkai, an astronomer who invented the Jōkyō calendar used for many decades, in the movie Tenchi: The Samurai Astronomer, directed by Yōjirō Takita. The director has previously won an Academy Award for Best Foreign Language Film, Departures, in 2009. Later that year, it was announced that Okada would appear in another film set for a spring 2013 release, The Eternal Zero, directed by Takashi Yamazaki. The film follows the journey of a kamikaze pilot named Kyuzo Miyabe, a man described as a coward who volunteered to die for his country.

== Personal life ==
He married actress Aoi Miyazaki on 23 December 2017. In May 2018, it was announced that he and his wife were expecting their first child. It was announced via fax message that their son was born in October 2018. In August 2025, his wife revealed in an interview with Josei Seven that she had given birth to their fourth child earlier that year. She also stated that she chose not to announce her second, third, and fourth pregnancies to avoid media attention.

== Martial arts practitioner ==
In 2010, Okada had reported in a press conference that he is certified to teach Jeet Kune Do and Kali in Japan, the latter was used by him as his main martial art when the SP series was filmed. Trained under USA Shooto instructor Yorinaga Nakamura.

While filming for The Fable: The Killer Who Doesn't Kill, Okada trained for a fight scene using jiu-jitsu. He continued training under jiu-jitsu artist Tomoyuki Hashimoto (CARPE DIEM), getting a brown belt in 2022. Okada participated for the first time in a public match in the International Brazilian Jiu-Jitsu Federation (IBJJF) World Master 2023 in Las Vegas, USA, on 31 August 2023, in the Master 3 Brown Belt Light Featherweight Division, winning his first round, but losing on the quarterfinals against Andrew Steve Slackta.

On October 27, 2024, it was reported that Okada had reached a significant milestone by earning his fifth black belt in Brazilian Jiu-Jitsu. The news was reported by the Carpe Diem Hiroo gym, to which he belongs.

== Filmography ==
=== Film ===
Year	Title	Role	Notes	Ref.
2003	Cosmic Rescue: The Moonlight Generations	Azuma Sawada	Lead role	
2003	Kisarazu Cat's Eye: Nihon Series	Kōhei "Bussan" Tabuchi	Lead role	
2003	Hard Luck Hero	Takashi Asai	Lead role	
2005	Tokyo Tower	Toru Kojima	Lead role	
2005	Hold Up Down	Koichi Sawamura	Lead role	
2005	Fly, Daddy, Fly	Soon-Shin Park	Lead role	
2006	Hana	Sōzaemon Aoki (Sōza)	Lead role	
2006	Kisarazu Cats Eye: World Series	Kōhei "Bussan" Tabuchi	Lead role	
2006	Tales from Earthsea	Prince Arren (voice)	Lead role	
2008	Flowers in the Shadows	Shin'ya	Lead role	
2009	Romantic Prelude	Satoshi Nojima	Lead role	
2010	SP: The Motion Picture	Kaoru Inoue	Lead role	
2011	SP: The Motion Picture II	Kaoru Inoue	Lead role	
2011	From Up on Poppy Hill	Shun Kazama (voice)	Lead role	
2012	Tenchi: The Samurai Astronomer	Shibukawa Shunkai (Santetsu Yasui)	Lead role	
2013	Library Wars	Atsushi Dojo	Lead role	
2013	The Eternal Zero	Kyūzō Miyabe	Lead role	
2014	A Samurai Chronicle	Shōzaburō Dan'no	Lead role	
2015	Library Wars: The Last Mission	Atsushi Dojo	Lead role	
2016	Everest: The Summit of the Gods	Makoto Fukamachi	Lead role	
2016	Fueled: The Man They Called Pirate	Tetsuzō Kunioka	Lead role	
2017	Reminiscence	Detective Atsushi Shikata	Lead role	
2017	Sekigahara	Ishida Mitsunari	Lead role	
2018	Samurai's Promise	Shinbei Uryū	Lead role	
2018	It Comes	Nozaki	Lead role	
2019	The Fable	Akira Satō	Lead role	
2021	The Fable: The Killer Who Doesn't Kill	Akira Satō	Lead role	
2021	Baragaki: Unbroken Samurai	Hijikata Toshizō	Lead role	
2022	Hell Dogs	Shōgo Kanetaka	Lead role	
2022	A Life of Climber	Narrator	Documentary	
2023	Hard Days	Kudō	Lead role	
2026	Children Untold	Toru Kikuzawa		
2026	Sukiyaki	Hachidai Nakamura	Lead role	

=== TV dramas ===
Year	Title	Role	Notes	Ref.
1995	V no Honoo	Junichi Okada		
1997	D×D	Toranosuke Kihara		
1998	Pu-Pu-Pu Jump	Kazuya Omine	Lead role	
1999	Shin Oretachi no Tabi	Shinroku Kumazawa		
1999	Dear Friend	Yuuji Yamamuro	TV movie	
2000	Mona Lisa no Hohoemi	Takuro Okajima		
2000	Oyaji	Tadashi Kanzaki		
2001	Chūshingura 1/47	Chikara Oishi	TV movie	
2001	Hanran no Voyage	Kunpei Sakaue		
2002	Love Quotient	Ryuji		
2002	Kisarazu Cat's Eye	Kōhei Tabuchi (Bussan)	Lead role	
2003	The Eldest Boy and His Three Elder Sisters	Ichiro Kashiwakura		
2005	Taika no Kaishin	Nakatomi no Kamatari	Lead role, miniseries	
2005	Fuyu no Undokai	Kikuo Kitazawa	Lead role, TV movie	
2005	Tiger & Dragon	Ryuji Yanaka (Kotatsu)		
2006	Niji wo Kakeru Ōhi	Yi Un	Miniseries	
2007	SP	Kaoru Inoue	Lead role	
2014	Gunshi Kanbei	Kuroda Kanbei	Lead role; Taiga drama	
2015	Library Wars: Book of Memories	Atsushi Dōjō	Lead role, TV movie	
2019	The Great White Tower	Gorō Zaizen	Lead role, miniseries	
2023	What Will You Do, Ieyasu?	Oda Nobunaga	Taiga drama	
2025	Last Samurai Standing	Saga Shūjirō	Lead role; also producer and action planner	

=== Television animation ===
Year	Title	Role	Notes	Ref.
2019	Crayon Shin-chan	Gorō Zaizen	Episode 997	

=== Other television ===
Year	Title	Notes	Ref.
2012–present	The Profiler	As host	
2013	64th NHK Kōhaku Uta Gassen	As a judge	
2025	Dareka to Nakai	co-host (the program ended before Okada had opportunity to appear).	
2026	Happyō! # Kotoshi Ichiban Kiita Uta ~ Nenkan Music Award 2026 ~	Co-host with Mone Kamishiraishi	

=== Japanese dub ===
Year	Title	Role	Notes	Ref.
2004	Thunderbirds	Alan Tracy		

== Awards and nominations ==
Year presented, name of the award ceremony, category, nominee(s) of the award, and the result of the nomination
Year	Award ceremony	Category	Nominated work(s)	Result
2002	32nd Television Drama Academy Awards (ja)	Best Actor	Kisarazu Cat's Eye	Nominated
2005	9th Nikkan Sports Drama Grand Prix	Best Supporting Actor	Tiger & Dragon	Won
2006	19th Nikkan Sports Film Awards	Ishihara Yujiro New Actor Award	Hana Yori mo Naho, Kisarazu Cat's Eye: World Series	Won
2008	56th Television Drama Academy Awards	Best Actor	SP	Won
2014	27th Nikkan Sports Film Awards	Best Actor	The Eternal Zero, A Samurai Chronicle	Won
2014	39th Hochi Film Awards	Best Actor	The Eternal Zero	Won
2015	57th Blue Ribbon Awards	Best Actor	A Samurai Chronicle	Nominated
2015	38th Japan Academy Film Prize	Best Actor	The Eternal Zero	Won
2015	38th Japan Academy Film Prize	Best Supporting Actor	A Samurai Chronicle	Won
2015	83rd Television Drama Academy Awards	Best Actor	Gunshi Kanbei	Won
2017	40th Japan Academy Film Prize	Best Actor	Fueled: The Man They Called Pirate	Nominated
2018	60th Blue Ribbon Awards	Best Actor	Reminiscence, Sekigahara	Nominated
2018	27th Tokyo Sports Film Awards	Best Actor	Sekigahara	Nominated
2018	41st Japan Academy Film Prize	Best Actor	Sekigahara	Nominated
2018	43rd Hochi Film Awards	Best Actor	Samurai's Promise	Nominated
2019	73rd Mainichi Film Awards	Best Actor	Samurai's Promise	Nominated
2019	42nd Japan Academy Film Prize	Best Actor	Samurai's Promise	Nominated
2021	34th Nikkan Sports Film Awards	Best Actor	Baragaki: Unbroken Samurai, The Fable: The Killer Who Doesn't Kill	Nominated
2021	46th Hochi Film Awards	Best Actor	Baragaki: Unbroken Samurai, The Fable: The Killer Who Doesn't Kill	Nominated
2022	64th Blue Ribbon Awards	Best Actor	Baragaki: Unbroken Samurai, The Fable: The Killer Who Doesn't Kill	Won
2022	47th Hochi Film Awards	Best Actor	Hell Dogs	Nominated
