= Tenchi: The Samurai Astronomer =

- Film poster
- Kanji: 天地明察
- Revised Hepburn: Tenchi Meisatsu
- Directed by: Yōjirō Takita
- Written by: Masato Katō; Yōjirō Takita
- Based on: Tenchi Meisatsu by Tow Ubukata
- Starring: Junichi Okada; Aoi Miyazaki; Ryuta Sato; Takashi Sasano; Ichikawa Somegorō VII; Kiichi Nakai; Matsumoto Kōshirō IX
- Narrated by: Hiroyuki Sanada
- Music by: Joe Hisaishi
- Release date: 15 September 2012
- Running time: 141 minutes
- Country: Japan
- Language: Japanese

Tenchi: The Samurai Astronomer (Japanese: 天地明察, Hepburn: Tenchi Meisatsu; lit. 'Insight on Earth and Sky') is a 2012 Japanese film directed by Yōjirō Takita.

== Cast ==
- Junichi Okada as Yasui Santetsu, the son of a prominent family who succeeded in changing a former calendar to the Jōkyō calendar during the Edo Period. He plays Go for living, but has interest in astronomy and is given the order to make a correct calendar by astronomical observations.
- Aoi Miyazaki as En, who works at Konno-Hachimangu Shrine where Santetsu and En meet while Santetsu is watching the question on a sangaku and En is cleaning the precinct. En is attracted to the straightforward nature of Santetsu, and after waiting for him to accomplish this challenge she marries him.
- Kiichi Nakai as Tokugawa Mitsukuni
- Ichikawa Ennosuke IV as Seki Takakazu, an arithmetician who lives a not-so-wealthy life. Although the story depicts his interaction with Santetsu through the Sangaku the Konno Hachiman Shrine, the confrontation between the two is depicted at the end of the story.
- Matsumoto Kōshirō IX as Hoshina Masayuki, a Japanese daimyo of Aizu domain, who gives Santetsu the chance to make a correct calendar and supports his entire challenge.
- Shōta Sometani as the fourth shogun Ietsuna
- Takashi Sasano as Takebe Den'nai, an old man with a big heart who leads the observation team. He travels to the countryside with Santetsu and others, but collapses during the grueling journey and leaves the team. Den'nai and Santetsu promise to see each other again in Choshi, but Den'nai dies of illness.
- Ittoku Kishibe as Itō Shigetaka, an old man who leads the team after the death of Takebe.
- Dai Watanabe as Andō Yūeki
- Kenichi Yajima as Hotta Masatoshi
- Keiji Mutoh as Heisuke
- You Yokoyama as Honinbo Dosaku, who is Santetsu's rival in Go, and asks Santetsu to play Go in reality.
- Hiroyuki Sanada as the narrator

== Plot ==
In the days when Copernicus's Heliocentrism was unknown to many, there was a man named Santetsu Yasui who attempted to create a correct calendar using astronomical observations.

Santetsu Yasui was born into the Yasui family, a prominent family that teaches Go to the shogun, is an honest man with no desire for advancement. He loves observing the stars and solving arithmetic problems and is often overly enthusiastic about them.

One day he goes to Konno-Hachimanngu Shrine to see new sangaku where he meets a girl named En, who works there and later becomes his wife, after he completes his challenge for making a new calendar. En tells Santetsu about the man who answered the question on sangaku at first sight.

On that day, Santetsu and his Go rival Hon'inbō Dōsaku agree to have a real game, not a predetermined performance in front of the Shogun Tokugawa Ietsuna and their own Go master. Their game is interrupted by a solar eclipse which is considered as an indication that bad things will happen. Although these two get scolded by their masters since their Go performance is not what it is supposed to be, the Ietsuna finds the game interesting.

In those days, Japan used the Senmyō calendar introduced from China which showed discrepancy little by little. Then Hoshina Masayuki gave Santetsu the order to make a correct calendar by astronomical observations. The process of correcting the calendar has to be done by Imperial Court and this makes his challenge hard and troublesome.

The film chronicles Santetsu Yasui's life as a mathematician and inventor of the Jōkyō calendar. It is an adaptation of the novel Tenchi meisatsu by Tow Ubukata.

== Reception ==
The film received mostly positive reviews. Rabble was critical of the runtime and complexities of the plot but ultimately called it a "whimsical cinematic experience." The Japan Times said that it was "probably the best film about calendar making you’ll ever see." Geek of Oz called it "a well executed period piece."

Variety was more critical, stating that Tenchi would only appeal to "science geeks."
