= Shibukawa (surname) =

Shibukawa (written: 渋川) is a Japanese surname. Notable people with the surname include:

- Kazuko Shibukawa (渋川 佳寿子, born 1947), Japanese actress and voice actress
- Kiyohiko Shibukawa (渋川 清彦, born 1974), Japanese actor
- Shibukawa Shunkai (渋川 春海, 1639–1715), Japanese astronomer
