= Tora and Mike =

Japanese manga and original net animation (ONA) series

- Manga volume 1 cover

トラとミケ (Tora to Mike)
- Genre: Slice of life
- Manga
- Written by: Nekomaki
- Published by: Shogakukan
- Magazine: Josei Seven
- Original run: May 17, 2018 – present
- Volumes: 3
- Original net animation
- Directed by: Yuzo Yamamoto
- Music by: Kyohei Matsuno
- Studio: Charaction
- Released: August 5, 2021 – present
- Runtime: 1 minute 45 seconds
- Episodes: 4

Tora and Mike (Note: English title is taken from japanesebooks.jp) (Japanese: トラとミケ, Hepburn: Tora to Mike) is a Japanese manga series written and illustrated by Nekomaki. It has been serialized once in a month in Shogakukan's Josei Seven magazine since May 17, 2018 issue and has been collected in three tankōbon volumes. A short original net animation (ONA) series adaption by Charaction premiered on August 5, 2021, and it is streaming on manga's official Twitter account. Also, this manga was the judges' choice of manga category in 21st Japan Media Arts Festival Awards.

== Characters ==
Tora (トラ)
Voiced by: Haruka Kitagaito
Mike (ミケ)
Voiced by: Kyoko Nakae
Saba-chan (サバちゃん)
Voiced by: Satoshi Moritaka
Sin-chan (シンちゃん)
Voiced by: Daisuke Hatooka
Rumi-chan (ルミちゃん)
Voiced by: Hikaru Kayō
Mr. Ueda (上田さん)
Voiced by: Sho Ito
Gensai (幻斎じい)
Voiced by: Kōhei Mitoma

== Media ==
=== Manga ===
Written by Nekomaki, Tora and Mike serialized in Shogakukan's Josei Seven magazine from May 17, 2018. Shogakukan has had its chapters collected into three tankōbon volumes. The first volume was published on June 18, 2019.

No.	Release date	ISBN
1	June 18, 2019	978-4-09-396544-6
2	July 16, 2020	978-4-09-396549-1
3	July 8, 2021	978-4-09-396551-4

=== Anime ===
This original net animation (ONA) is produced by Japanese studio Charaction and directed by Yuzo Yamamoto. Planning by Minoru Hirata, art direction by Minobu Yamada and Kyohei Matsuno composed the music.
