= Fuji Television sexual harassment scandal =

Sexual assault allegations against Fuji Television

In December 2024, Japanese magazines such as Josei Seven and Shūkan Bunshun reported on sexual harassment and assault allegations against former television personality Masahiro Nakai. The reports also alleged that executives at Fuji Television (Fuji TV) were involved in covering up the accusations. The scandal resulted in several advertisers ending their partnerships with Fuji TV and led to the resignation of senior executives in January 2025. Due to its scale, the controversy has been referred to as the Fuji Television problem (フジテレビ問題, Fuji Terebi Mondai) or the Fuji Television incident (フジテレビ騒動, Fuji Terebi Sōdō).

== Background ==
Following the allegations first reported by Shūkan Bunshun in December 2024, the first press conference was held on January 17, 2025, by then–Fuji Television President Koichi Minato. The conference was criticized not only for being held behind closed doors, but also for allowing attendance only by a limited number of members from the broadcaster's press club. Transcripts and other materials were not permitted to be published by Japanese newspapers, online news outlets, or even Fuji TV itself, nor was live broadcasting allowed. The event coincided with the 30th anniversary of the Great Hanshin–Awaji Earthquake.

The company's corporate governance and compliance system came under heavy criticism, leading 75 advertising companies to withdraw their commercials from Fuji TV. Management accountability was questioned, resulting in the resignations of President Minato and Fuji Media Holdings (FMH) and Fuji Television Chairman Shuji Kano.

Although not directly related to the case, questions were also raised about the responsibility of FMH and Fuji Television Director and Advisor Hisashi Hieda and his influence on decisions made by employees and other executives.

Media and public pressure led Nakai to announce his retirement from all entertainment activities on January 23, just days after the first press conference, taking responsibility for the controversy.

On January 27, Fuji Television held a second press conference, which also drew strong criticism from the public for the way some reporters questioned the management team.

Shūkan Bunshun, which had first reported the case, revised portions of its original article on the morning of the second press conference, publishing a correction in its digital edition. This revision caused inconsistencies between the reporters' questions and the management's answers, leading to confusion and resulting in an unusually long press conference lasting more than ten hours.

Public criticism of Bunshun's editorial stance grew, and the issue developed into a wider debate about media ethics in Japan. Bunshun later issued an apology for the corrections.

In a self-examination program broadcast by Fuji Television in July 2025, Director F of the Announcements Department testified that the company's initial response—limiting information sharing to two doctors at the company's health consultation center—should have involved outside experts, calling the approach "inconsiderate." Reflecting on his decision to inform the victim of her removal from the program, he expressed regret, saying, "I wonder if I really had no choice but to cut short her hope of somehow overcoming her painful experience and moving forward."

Minato stated, "I truly apologize for not being able to fully empathize with the woman's feelings and for causing her pain." Ota said, "I didn't intend to protect Mr. Nakai, but looking back, I can't help but think that I did."

== History ==
=== Timeline ===
==== 2013 ====
- A case identified in the third-party investigation involved a Fuji TV executive also named in the Nakai case (not directly related to Nakai).

==== 2021 ====
- A "suite room meeting" was held at a foreign-affiliated hotel. The third-party investigation identified this case as involving the same Fuji TV executive connected to the Nakai case (Nakai-related).

==== 2023 ====
- May – A barbecue was reportedly attended by Tsurube, Hiromi, Nakai, the executive, and a woman. According to reports, nothing happened on that occasion.
- June – Nakai, a Fuji TV executive, and a woman allegedly met at a party. When the executive was unable to attend, Nakai and the woman were left alone. Allegations later surfaced that an incident occurred behind closed doors. Nakai and the woman reportedly reached a settlement, with media outlets claiming the payment was approximately ¥90 million.

==== 2024 ====
- August – The woman, identified as an announcer, left Fuji TV.
- December 19 – Josei Seven reported the incident.
- December 26 – Shūkan Bunshun reported the incident.
- December 27 – Fuji TV released a statement on its website, denying employee involvement.

==== 2025 ====
===== January =====
- January 8 – Bunshun reported that the woman had consulted with a Fuji TV executive. Fuji suspended broadcasts of Dareka to Nakai.
- January 9 – Nakai was expected to issue an apology.
- January 14 – Dalton Investments, a major shareholder, sent its first letter to Fuji Media Holdings (FMH), calling for the establishment of a third-party committee.
- January 16 – Bunshun reported another alleged incident involving a Fuji TV executive, Nakai, and another woman.
- January 17 – Fuji TV President Minato held the first press conference, with limited media access and restrictions. Minato acknowledged being aware of the incident since June 2023. A third-party committee was established. The story began receiving international coverage in France, including reports from Le Parisien and Le Figaro.
- January 18 – Advertisers including Meiji Yasuda Life, Nippon Life, Toyota, and NTT East suspended their commercials on Fuji TV.
- January 19 – Josei Seven summarized the developments up to that date.
- January 20 – YouTuber Kanon Aoki alleged sexual abuse by a Fuji TV executive. By this point, approximately 40 sponsors had halted advertising on the network.
- January 21 – Additional international media outlets began reporting the case.^{et al.} Kikkoman requested the removal of Kuishinbo, a long-running program, which was replaced by a news program.
- January 22 – Dalton Investments sent a second letter to FMH, referencing the first press conference and requesting an unrestricted second conference. By this date, 75 companies had withdrawn advertisements from Fuji TV and its affiliates.
- January 23 – Fuji Media Holdings held an extraordinary board meeting, requested by Kiyoto Saito, president of Nippon Cultural Broadcasting, a major FMH shareholder. Nakai announced his retirement from the entertainment industry.
- January 24 – Fuji TV began replacing commercials with Ad Council Japan public service announcements (PSAs) and informed sponsors they would not be billed for January and February placements.
- January 27 – Fuji TV held a board meeting before the second press conference. Executives Kano and Minato resigned. Bunshun corrected information previously published on December 26 and later apologized for the confusion.
- January 30 – FMH announced plans to revise its March earnings forecast, projecting losses of approximately ¥9.8 billion. Twenty-eight affiliates were expected to lose around ¥1.4 billion, with an additional ¥300 million in related losses. Fuji TV stated it was considering legal action against Nakai and Bunshun. Tsurube's Sushiro commercials stopped airing.
- January 31 – Fuji TV announced the cancellation of the spring edition of the long-running FNS Music Festival scheduled for April.

===== February =====
- February 1–3 – Former Fuji TV announcer Yutaka Hasegawa appeared on Horiemon's YouTube channel on February 1, alleging sexual harassment by two superiors. On February 2, he apologized, claiming his comments were meant as a joke. On February 3, he asked the public to refrain from harassment, stating that as a former Fuji TV employee, he was willing to act as the "bad guy" if it would help bring change.
- February 3 – Production issues arose due to sponsor withdrawals and denied filming permits. The program Run for Money was affected. Dalton Investments sent a third letter demanding Hieda's resignation.
- February 4 – The Ministry of Internal Affairs and Communications stated there was no reason to revoke Fuji TV's broadcasting license. The third-party committee began employee interviews.
- February 5 – FNS 27-Jikan TV was temporarily suspended. Yoshimoto Kogyo announced self-restraint measures for artists due to possible compliance issues.
- February 6 – Expo 2025 and Sushiro resumed advertising on Fuji TV.
- February 7 – Kinliser resumed advertising.
- February 8 – Women began posting on social media using the hashtag #私が退職した本当の理由 ("The real reason I quit").
- February 25 – The number of Fuji TV sponsors stood at 72.
- February 27 – Adviser Hieda resigned. President Shimizu reported that February broadcasting revenue had declined by about 90%, with PSAs replacing ads from 311 companies by the end of January. Fuji TV announced the establishment of the "Revitalization and Reform Project Headquarters."

===== March =====
- March 27 – Fuji TV and FMH held board meetings and a joint press conference. Decisions included Hieda's June resignation, reducing the number of directors to ten, setting an approximate average director age of 50, and ensuring women would make up 30% of the board.
- March 31 – Fuji TV received the results of the third-party investigation and held a press conference.

===== April =====
- April 4 – The Kansai TV labor union announced it was considering a strike if management, including former Fuji TV Vice President Ota and adviser Hieda (also an outside director for Kansai TV), did not resign by April 8. Ota subsequently resigned as president of Kansai TV.
- April 16 – Dalton Investments sent Fuji TV a letter proposing twelve candidates for its Board of Directors.

===== May =====
- May 9 – Nakai provided six hours of testimony to the third-party committee.
- May 12 – Nakai's legal team disputed the committee's findings.
- May 22 – Nakai's team received a response letter.
- May 30 – Nakai's team re-submitted an information request.

===== June =====
- June 5 – Fuji TV announced plans to sue former president Minato and Director Ota.
- June 14 – Advertisements were scheduled to resume in July at the discretion of sponsors, pending the June 25 shareholder meeting.

===== August =====
- August 18 – Amuse Inc. denied a Josei Seven claim that Masaharu Fukuyama had refused to answer questions from Fuji TV's third-party committee.
- August 28 – Fuji TV filed lawsuits against former executives Minato and Ota.

===== September =====
- September 10, 12 – Fuji Media Holdings sells overseas market shares of Toei Animation. Profits expected to grow because of the sale, to around 16.5 billion yen, 6.5 billion over the predicted gains.
- September 27– Mitsubishi Electric and others have announced to return by October's restructuring period.

==== 2026 ====
- Mid–July – Company meeting in which new department (A.I. Center), and A.I. tool are revealed to the company, as headed and designed by former programming executive involved in the Nakai incident.

== First (un)reported incident ==
In December 2024, reports emerged in Japanese tabloid newspapers alleging that Nakai had engaged in nonconsensual sexual activity with an unnamed woman in her twenties in June 2023.

After the alleged incident, Fuji Television executives were reportedly informed, but the broadcaster took no public action against Nakai, and the matter was not widely covered in the Japanese media. Subsequent reports suggested that although some executives were aware of the issue, Fuji TV's compliance department had not been notified and the information was not shared internally.

The story began to gain wider attention after two Japanese tabloids covered it: Josei Seven on December 19, 2024, followed by Shūkan Bunshun on December 26, 2024. According to Josei Seven, the woman had planned to have dinner with Nakai and a Fuji TV employee in 2023, but when the employee failed to attend, a dispute reportedly occurred. (Note: Initially, the tabloid magazines Josei Seven and Shūkan Bunshun reported that the settlement amount was 90 million yen. However, in an interview published by another tabloid, Shūkan Post, on January 17, 2025, the woman stated, "I did not receive 90 million yen," suggesting that the settlement was significantly smaller. Nakai's representatives declined to comment on the amount, citing confidentiality. The Japanese Wikipedia subsequently removed the 90 million yen figure and replaced it with the expression "settlement money" (解決金).)

Fuji TV released a statement on its official website on December 27, 2024:

We have recently received reports in some weekly magazines and other media concerning our employees.
The content of the article is untrue, and the employee in question was not involved in any way, including the arrangement of the dinner meeting mentioned in the article.
We were not aware of the existence of the meeting, and there is no evidence that the employee was absent without notice on the day of the meeting.
We have also informed the publisher to that effect. We will refrain from commenting on other matters related to privacy.

We remain sincere in our relationships with performers and stakeholders and will continue to strengthen compliance efforts.

Regarding this matter, there have been speculative articles and social media posts concerning our employees and related parties.
We cannot tolerate any content that may lead to defamation or slander, and we ask that you refrain from sharing such content.

Although Fuji TV denied the involvement of the executive mentioned in reports, a follow-up article alleged that the same executive had entertained a company announcer at a dinner party attended by Nakai.

At this point, coverage in Japan remained limited to tabloid outlets. French media, including Le Parisien and Le Figaro, were among the first international outlets to report on the incident.

Following the growing controversy, several broadcasters suspended or withdrew programs featuring Nakai. On January 8, 2025, Fuji TV announced the temporary suspension of his co-hosted program Dareka to Nakai, originally scheduled to air on January 12.

The show, formerly titled Matsumo to Nakai and co-hosted by Nakai and Hitoshi Matsumoto, had already been slated to end in March 2025, partly due to Matsumoto's own sexual assault allegations. It was rebranded as Someone and Nakai, introducing new co-hosts such as Arashi's Kazunari Ninomiya and Tsuyoshi Muro. Although Junichi Okada had been scheduled to appear as a guest co-host on January 12, the broadcast was canceled. The program was officially terminated on January 22, 2025.

== Other claims ==
Several individuals have accused Fuji TV employees of sexual harassment.

- Former Sky PerfecTV! announcer and YouTuber Kanon Aoki alleged that she was sexually harassed in the past, which she discussed on her YouTube channel. Aoki initially posted about the incident on X (formerly Twitter) on January 14, 2025, and later elaborated in a video released on January 20. In the video, she stated that her work required interaction with Fuji TV's production department, describing it as "a revolving door" of people coming and going. Aoki described her alleged harasser as a high-ranking and influential executive at the station, claiming that the person had shown her compromising photos with other celebrities. However, she chose not to reveal the individual's name, citing concerns for her safety and potential legal repercussions.
- Former announcer Yutaka Hasegawa, who worked at Fuji TV from 1999 to 2013, appeared in a YouTube video uploaded on February 1, 2025, by Takafumi Horie. Hasegawa claimed that sexual harassment at the station was not limited to female employees, alleging that he had been harassed by two senior male colleagues. During the 55-minute discussion, he commented that announcers had to comply with instructions from the general programming staff despite taking a separate "announcement exam." One of the individuals he named, Shunsuke Kasai, a former freelance announcer for Fuji TV, denied the allegation on his blog. Kasai stated that he had no recollection of the dinner in question and disputed Hasegawa's account, saying, "I can completely deny the 'tribute,'" and "I think he's misremembering." On February 2, Hasegawa posted on X (formerly Twitter) that his comments were intended as a joke, writing that he felt guilty for causing trouble to Kasai and another colleague. He later asked his followers not to post defamatory comments about either colleague and stated that his intention was to criticize Fuji TV's internal system rather than individuals.
- In the same February 1 YouTube video, Hasegawa and Horie discussed the treatment of female employees at Fuji TV, alleging that women, regardless of their roles, were expected to serve as "hostesses." Hasegawa referenced former announcers Aya Takashima and Ayako Kato, noting that Kato had previously mentioned during a 2017 episode of Kujipan that she was asked to pose seductively during her job interview. She later learned from human resources that the question was inappropriate and could have been considered harassment.
- Reports have also resurfaced about Fuji TV's "Announcer Calendar," featuring 12 female announcers in their 20s and 30s. The annual calendar, first released in 2014, is produced in collaboration with the fashion magazine JJ (published by Kobunsha). The 2025 edition was released under the theme "The Element of Smiles." Critics have argued that the project reinforces outdated gender norms.
- A journalist also recalled two books published by Fuji Television Publishing, Anna Book (1987) and Anna Book 2 (1991), which featured interviews with the network's announcers. Some interviewees reportedly described instances of sexual harassment by senior staff members. The books were criticized for including sexually suggestive questions and imagery, including covers featuring female announcers posed as if they were nude.

== Initial response ==
On January 17, 2025, Fuji Television held a press conference in response to the allegations, but the event was widely criticized, leading to major repercussions such as the full suspension of commercial broadcasts.

On January 21, Kiyoto Saito, president of Nippon Cultural Broadcasting—a major shareholder of Fuji TV's parent company, Fuji Media Holdings (FMH), and a key member of the Fujisankei Communications Group—requested that FMH convene an extraordinary board of directors meeting. Acting in the joint names of all seven outside directors, including Saito, the group sought an explanation from FMH regarding the matter. In response, FMH held the meeting on January 23.

Fuji Television held another extraordinary board meeting on January 27, during which discussions reportedly included the potential resignation of President Koichi Minato. A press conference was held later that day at 4:00 p.m.

The issue has been reported not only in Japan but also by several international media outlets, including France, the United States, the United Kingdom, South Korea, Singapore, Germany, and China. Coverage appeared in Variety, The Times, BBC News, KBS, The Straits Times, German-language outlet Sumikai, the Associated Press, Malay Mail, Sing Tao Daily, and Deadline Hollywood. Bloomberg News also reported on Fuji Media Holdings' plans to establish an independent investigation panel.

=== Hieda's resignation ===
Advisor Hisashi Hieda was described in the media as being "on the run"—a reference to the title of a Fuji TV program—after his car was reportedly not seen in the parking lot of the hotel where he had been staying since the January 27 press conference. A source from the network stated that Hieda had been attempting to avoid direct contact with reporters seeking comment.

On February 27, during a press conference held by Fuji Media Holdings (FMH) following a regular board meeting, it was announced that Hieda—who was absent due to hospitalization for a compression fracture sustained in a fall at his home—had resigned as a member of the Management Advisory Committee. FMH President Osamu Kanemitsu also announced that he and Fuji Television President Kenji Shimizu had been newly appointed to the committee, with Kanemitsu taking Hieda's place.

The Management Advisory Committee was established in June 2023. Most of its members are independent outside directors, and the committee is chaired by one of them. In response to inquiries from the board of directors, the committee deliberates and provides advice and recommendations on general management issues, the appointment and dismissal of directors, remuneration for directors excluding those on the Audit and Supervisory Committee, and other matters deemed necessary by the board.

On the same day, the Nippon Broadcasting System, a radio station under the Fuji Media Holdings group, updated its official website to publish the results of an internal survey on "dinners with celebrities or program-related personnel." The report stated that "no inappropriate dining with celebrities or individuals related to programs was confirmed."

=== Company restructuring ===
On July 10, 2025, Fuji Television announced a major internal reorganization. The Announcers Office was separated from the Programming Department, elevated to a station-level division, and placed under the Corporate Headquarters, which reports directly to the president. This change removed announcer management from the control of the Programming and Production Departments, which had previously overseen casting.

A new management department was also created within the station to strengthen oversight of announcer casting. The General Programming Division, which had supervised the Variety Production Department, was dissolved. In its place, a three-division system was introduced, consisting of the Corporate Headquarters, Content Strategy Headquarters, and Studio Strategy Headquarters, all reporting directly to the president.

Under this system, programming functions were transferred to the Content Investment Strategy Bureau within the Content Strategy Headquarters. The Production Department was consolidated into the Studio Strategy Headquarters and reorganized into three studios: Studio 1, responsible for dramas and films, and Studios 2 and 3, responsible for variety and information programs.

One year later, on August 4, 2026, it was revealed that "Mr. A", one of the people involved in the case, who was head of programming at the time of the incident, and who was demoted and had received one-month disciplinary leave of absence because of it, had developed an A.I. tool based on his knowledge of the network programming, and was now in charge of a new department, the "A.I. Center". It wasn't announced until a mid–July company meeting that the former executive had been provided with the opportunity to open a new section, after his tool had been received with praise. According to a Fuji TV insider, only a very small number of people within Fuji TV knew about "Mr. A's" AI development and the establishment of the new department. As a result, whenever the media asked about it, they repeatedly gave vague answers. "Mr. A's" transfer to a newly established AI department, as well as the full scope of the AI developed by Mr. A, which had been kept hidden even from employees, was revealed to all employees for the first time after that meeting, according to another insider. The tool was designed to act as a sounding board and advisor during creative work, optimizing on-air structure, idea generation, program length, and segment development, and is already being used in the new programming. The decision to entrust the future to someone who represents Fuji's old regime has caused quite a few employees to express their displeasure.

== Stock prices and investor movements ==
In response to the controversy, on January 14, 2025, the American investment fund Dalton Investments—which holds approximately 7% of Fuji Media Holdings (FMH) shares—sent a letter to the company requesting the establishment of a third-party committee to investigate the incident and restore public confidence.

Following the company's initial press conference, Dalton Investments sent a second letter to FMH on January 22, describing the event as a "virtual car crash" and suggesting that upper management may have been involved in a cover-up. The firm requested that a second press conference, open to cameras, be held within the week.

On February 3, Dalton Investments sent a third letter to FMH, this time demanding the resignation of advisor Hisashi Hieda. The letter stated that "he has immense control and influence over the Board of Directors, and this scandal has revealed that corporate governance is completely dysfunctional," and criticized the company's leadership structure, saying, "it is hard to believe that a single individual has been allowed to dominate this large broadcasting group for nearly 40 years." The firm warned that "sponsors and partners will not return unless this structure is urgently reviewed."

After Hieda's resignation, Dalton Investments sent another letter in April, proposing 12 candidates for FMH's Board of Directors. The list included financiers, business leaders, and figures from the entertainment industry, along with recommendations for further governance reforms.

As a result of the controversy and related factors, FMH's stock price fell by 13% over three weeks. However, figures such as entrepreneur Takafumi Horie and investor Shinta Tabata, along with lawyer and YouTuber Takeshi Okano, announced plans to buy FMH shares to participate in the upcoming shareholders' meeting. These developments led to speculation among individual investors and a rebound in the stock price.

The temporary surge in FMH's stock value despite the scandal was attributed to buybacks by short sellers, as well as FMH's low price-to-book ratio and unrealized gains in its real estate holdings, such as Sankei Building.

Meanwhile, NTT Docomo, which holds about 3% of FMH's shares, also requested that Fuji Television investigate the causes of the scandal and provide regular updates on its findings. Both domestic and international shareholders have continued to urge Fuji Television to take corrective action.

In September 2025, Fuji Media Holdings decided to sell about 100 billion yen of their shares of Toei Animation in overseas markets. Fuji HD's shareholding ratio (based on voting rights) is expected to drop from about 8.31% to about 3.19% due to the sale. Its net profit is expected to rise to 16.5 billion yen (previously expected 10 billion yen) for the fiscal year ending March 2026.

== Press conferences ==
=== January 17: Press conference by Fuji Television President Koichi Minato ===
At 3:00 p.m. on January 17, Fuji Television President Koichi Minato (at the time) held a press conference regarding the allegations in the large conference room on the 10th floor of Fuji Television's headquarters. The conference was moved up from the regular press event originally scheduled for February.

The press conference lasted about one hour and 45 minutes. During the briefing, it was revealed that the company had been aware of the Nakai allegations since June 2023, shortly after the incident occurred, and had appointed an outside attorney to verify the facts and assess the company's response. Fuji Television announced the formation of an investigation committee, with Minato confirming that he himself would be subject to its review. He stated that he was "shocked" when the allegations were published by Shūkan Bunshun, explaining that dinner gatherings with female announcers had been common practice when he produced variety programs in the 1980s and 1990s—one reason he decided to hold the press conference. Social media users also noted that the company's 1980s slogan, "If it's not fun, it's not TV," may have implicitly referred to such events.

The press conference was organized at the request of the press club, which includes newspaper and broadcast company representatives. Thirty-three journalists from 19 organizations attended. Weekly magazines, online outlets, and foreign media not affiliated with the club were barred from attending or filming. NHK and commercial broadcasters in Tokyo (excluding Tokyo MX) were allowed to observe but were not permitted to ask questions.

Filming was prohibited, and photography was permitted only at the beginning of the event. Details of the discussion were released only after it ended. Because of these restrictions, the press conference was covered mainly through still images, leading some to deride it as a "picture-story show" press conference. According to Bunshun Online, President Minato—who had initially opposed holding a press event—was joined by FMH Managing Director Masato Ishihara, a close associate of advisor Hisashi Hieda. The decision to restrict access reportedly went against objections from some board members. The Independent also reported that Minato stated he believed Fuji Television employees had done nothing wrong.

The company's handling of the press conference drew widespread criticism from both the media and the public.

Fuji TV employees and alumni also voiced disapproval. Announcer Manami Miyaji stated on Live News It! that "the press conference was not made completely public, even to employees. I hope management will offer an honest explanation and disclose information sincerely." Former Fuji reporter and current Kanagawa Governor Yuji Kuroiwa also commented, "I thought Fuji TV's press conference would be broadcast live, so I was surprised it wasn't. I was shocked there was no video."

The presence of a Red Fuji painting behind the speakers during the event also drew attention, with some viewers calling it "tone-deaf." Additionally, when the company's own news program Live News It! initially aired the press conference with the caption "Fuji Television President Apology," it was reportedly changed to "Fuji President Explanation" after complaints from the president's office.

On January 19, the petition platform Change.org hosted a campaign initiated by Minami Akira, a former Asahi Shimbun journalist and current Ryukyu Shimpo editorial board member, calling on Fuji Television to "redo" the press conference. The petition, titled "We Demand the Truth Be Revealed," criticized the company for holding an "unfair" and restricted press event and urged management to hold an open conference allowing full participation and recording. The campaign quickly gained support from journalists and public figures across Japan.

=== January 22: Kansai Television President Toru Ota's press conference ===
Toru Ota, a former drama producer and executive officer of Fuji Television who later served as managing director at Fuji TV and is currently president of Kansai Television—a semi-key station in the Kansai region affiliated with Fuji—held a press conference on January 22 following his arrest related to the same issue. Unlike the Fuji Television press conference, which faced criticism for being "closed," Kansai Television allowed non-affiliated media to attend and ask questions, though the event was not broadcast live.

Regarding the Nakai incident at Fuji Television, Ota stated, "This was an incident when I was working at Fuji Television. It happened one and a half years ago. Kansai Television has no involvement in this matter. I would like to sincerely apologize to everyone and the staff for the inconvenience and concern caused."

Concerning his response at the time of the incident, Ota explained that he had immediately reported it to Fuji Television President Koichi Minato on the same day. He emphasized that the victim's care and privacy were prioritized, with a limited number of employees assigned to support her, and noted that the staff might have been able to offer closer attention.

Kansai Television also reported that nearly 30 companies had suspended their commercials due to the issue, which were temporarily replaced with AC Japan PSAs. Ota expressed that he was deeply shocked by the Nakai and Fuji Television incident and emphasized that Kansai Television intends to investigate similar issues internally. He stated, "We are planning to conduct a thorough investigation in accordance with our human rights policy."

The press conference, including a question-and-answer session, lasted approximately two hours and ten minutes.

=== January 27: Extended "long-running press conference" ===
On January 27, Fuji Television held a press conference lasting approximately 10 hours and 25 minutes, beginning around 4:00 p.m. and concluding at 2:25 a.m. on January 28. About 400 members of the press attended, including freelance journalists. Fuji TV announced that the conference would continue until every question had been addressed. The event was streamed on TVer, Nico Nico, and Abema, and the full conference was also made available on Fuji TV's FNN YouTube channel. Chief producer Takashi Watanabe explained the decision to broadcast the conference: "As soon as the press conference was decided, it was determined to show it as-is. If it seemed like we were hiding something, it would be the end of the company." The broadcast was delayed by 10 minutes to protect the privacy of those involved.

During the press conference, 10 programs were either canceled or postponed to accommodate coverage. Attendees included former Fuji TV President Koichi Minato, Chairman Shuji Kano, Vice Chairman Ryunosuke Endo, Fuji Media Holdings President Osamu Kanemitsu, and newly appointed Fuji TV President Kenji Shimizu. Hisashi Hieda, the 87-year-old chairperson of the Fujisankei Communications Group and influential Fuji TV executive, did not attend and did not resign, which drew attention. Kano explained that daily operations were handled by Minato and himself, while Endo stated that "all respective board members will take responsibility once the results of the third-party investigation are out."

Regarding Nakai's dinner party, Fuji TV repeatedly stated that internal hearings found no evidence that executives were involved. Minato clarified that Nakai had informed the company of the incident in July 2023, and the company initially understood it as a private matter between Nakai and the woman, leading them to refrain from further investigation. A correction to Shukan Bunshun's original reporting, clarifying that the woman had not been invited by an executive, was issued before the conference.

Fuji TV announced that a third-party investigation would be conducted under the guidelines of the Japan Federation of Bar Associations, with a committee headed by Akira Takeuchi, a lawyer experienced in corporate fraud investigations. Takeuchi will be joined by two lead members, with additional members to be decided later. Results are expected by the end of March. Newly appointed president Shimizu stated, "This incident has brought home to us the weight of trust and the severity of losing it. We will take strict action against any deviant behavior and thoroughly implement measures to prevent recurrence of such acts."

At the conclusion of the broadcast, anchors Minoru Aoi and Manami Miyaji reflected on the press conference. News department editor-in-chief Hidetoshi Hiramatsu said, "Fuji TV brought it on itself to have a press conference that lasted over 10 hours," while Watanabe noted that the event was treated as a program rather than a simple stream, emphasizing the need to accurately convey the proceedings. Watanabe also expressed regret over the lack of camera coverage at the January 17 conference, highlighting the gap between the broadcaster and the public.

Coverage by other broadcasters was limited; neither NHK nor TV Asahi broadcast the press conference live. Viewership for Fuji TV programs covering the press conference was two to four times higher than the four-week average preceding the event.

=== February 27, 2025: Board meeting and subsequent press conference ===
On February 27, Fuji Television and its parent company, Fuji Media Holdings (HD), held a regular board meeting at their headquarters in Odaiba, Tokyo. Following the meeting, Fuji TV President Kenji Shimizu addressed the press. He announced the establishment of the "Revitalization and Reform Project Headquarters" and apologized to all parties affected by the incident, acknowledging that retaining Nakai was a mistake.

The Revitalization and Reform Project Headquarters also announced the creation of a working group aimed at preventing future incidents and reforming corporate culture. Six measures, already implemented, were outlined: strengthening the effectiveness of the compliance system, imposing stricter penalties for compliance violations, harassment, and human rights violations, clarifying and widely publicizing the scope of individuals eligible to use the reporting system, formulating guidelines for dining out and meetings, implementing human rights and compliance education and training, and initiating dialogue as part of human rights due diligence.

=== March 27, 2025: Board meeting and subsequent press conference ===
On the afternoon of March 27, Fuji Television held an extraordinary general shareholders meeting and a board of directors meeting, during which it decided to review its management structure. Following the meetings, Fuji Television President Kenji Shimizu and Fuji Media Holdings (FMH) President Osamu Kanemitsu addressed the press. Significant changes were announced to restore trust in the company.

First, Hisashi Hieda resigned as director effective June. Second, the total number of directors was reduced from 22 to 10, with the proportion of female directors increased to 30% and the age of new directors lowered to around 50. President Shimizu explained that the decision to create a more compact board aimed to separate the execution of duties from the supervisory function of directors. Regarding the timing of these changes prior to the resolution of the third-party committee, President Kanemitsu stated that "it was better to do everything we could as soon as possible to restore trust. We recognized that renewing the management structure was a major point, so we wanted to make a decision and announce it as soon as possible."

Regarding sponsors, President Shimizu noted that the company did not have a clear outlook for April, as approximately 70% of sponsors were still holding their decisions.

=== March 31, 2025: Third-party committee report and press conference ===
On March 31, the investigation report of the third-party committee was released on the official website of Fuji Media Holdings. The committee held a press conference at 5:00 p.m. on the same day. In response, Fuji Television Network, Inc. and its parent company, Fuji Media Holdings, Inc., also held a press conference attended by the station's president, Kenji Shimizu.

The investigative report alone spans 273 pages, and including the results of a separate questionnaire for executives and employees, as well as a summary version, the total report amounts to 394 pages.

The report concluded that the woman had been subjected to sexual violence by Nakai, as defined by the World Health Organization (WHO). It also found numerous other instances of sexual harassment and power harassment by individuals other than Nakai, including a case in which a female announcer was forced to attend a dinner party unrelated to her job and was kissed by a male employee.

The report further indicated that sexual harassment of female employees was widespread not only within Fuji Television but also at advertising agencies, sponsors, program performers, and companies where interviews were conducted. Additional issues emerged, including the discovery that many employees were unable to report misconduct because, in some cases, complaints submitted to supervisors were leaked to perpetrators, resulting in disadvantages for the victims.

In response to the report, President Kenji Shimizu issued an apology for the company's handling of the incidents, its corporate culture, and governance, and pledged to implement improvements.

=== April 4, 2025: Kansai TV President Ota's press conference ===
On April 4, 2025, Kansai TV President Toru Ota held a press conference in which he announced his resignation. He stated that his previous role as vice president of Fuji TV, and the network's delayed or insufficient response to related incidents, had directly harmed Kansai TV.

According to a station spokesperson, Kansai TV was projected to incur losses totaling approximately ¥900 million by the end of April, including ¥300 million in losses from January to March. Total sales were reported to be about 70% lower than the previous year. At the time, 63 companies had suspended the airing of commercials within the station's programming, and the company had received approximately 170 complaints, many requesting Ota's resignation.

During the press conference, Ota announced that Sumiro Fukui, the chairman of the Board of Directors, would serve as acting president, and that Hisashi Hieda would remain on the board of directors until June.

=== June 6, 2025: Fuji TV press conference ===
On June 6, 2025, Fuji Television president Kenji Shimizu held a press conference, during which he announced that the broadcaster was pursuing legal action against former president and CEO Koichi Minato and former senior managing director Toru Ota under the Companies Act, and that preparations for litigation had begun.

Shimizu also stated that a former programming manager found to have been involved in the incident would be demoted by four levels and placed on a one-month disciplinary leave.

== Employee reactions and influence ==
Membership in the labor union, which had previously been low for a commercial broadcaster, increased rapidly, with reports indicating that several announcers had recently joined.

On the January 20 edition of Mezamashi 8, announcer Yoshihisa Sakanushi became emotional and cried when discussing the issue on air, drawing criticism from some viewers.

In response to intensive media coverage, female announcers were required to take taxis to and from work to avoid direct reporting. This contrasts with 2015, when low viewership affected employee salaries. At that time, bonuses and other supplementary income, such as taxi fares, were cut. The company restricted taxi use to late-night and early-morning hours and encouraged carpooling. Popular female announcers sometimes used taxis, but fares were paid out-of-pocket, while others shared the cost.

The controversy also affected production sites, with screenwriter Koki Mitani and comedian Ryota Yamasato reporting issues such as being denied permission for location filming.

Current and former female announcers and program guests at Fuji TV have also been the target of online slander and false rumors, which they publicly denied. Fuji TV has also announced it is considering legal action.

On January 23, at 14:30, Ryunosuke Endo, chairman of the Japan Commercial Broadcasting Federation and Vice Chairman of Fuji TV, held a press conference. Following the announcement of Masahiro Nakai's retirement from entertainment, the Fuji TV Vice Chairman held an additional press conference.

Later the same day, at 17:30, Fuji TV conducted a remote information session for employees.

=== Role of the female announcer ===
Female announcers at Fuji TV have a long history, predating the Equal Employment Opportunity Law. Historically, the perception was that "the news is for men to read." Main announcers were typically male, while female announcers often held supporting roles, including serving tea to the main cast. Misuzu Tamaru, who declined a job offer from a trading company to join Fuji TV, was one of the pioneers of this shift, working alongside main anchor Masataka Itsumi. Mitsuko Yorichika, a former NHK announcer who later joined Fuji, was considered the original "talent female announcer," appearing in television magazines. While Yorichika primarily worked on information programs, her popularity led Shochiku Films to cast her as a bar hostess.

As the role of announcers evolved, Fuji TV began using external announcers in news programs and variety shows, returning female announcers to secondary roles and making them more easily replaceable. Starting with "Oretachi Hyokinzoku", female announcers were nicknamed "hyokin anna," marking the beginning of the "celebrity announcer" phenomenon.

Casting of female announcers has historically emphasized appearance. Candidates were selected for attractiveness and screen presence, often wearing attire considered visually appealing on camera. Many commercial network announcers were expected to hold titles such as "Miss [school name]," representing prestigious institutions like Keio University. Age was also a consideration; women around 30 were sometimes regarded as "window-sitters," expected to decide quickly whether to continue in their roles, pursue freelance work, or marry—often to prominent individuals, including celebrities, athletes, entrepreneurs, or heirs to companies. Many announcers subsequently pursued careers as celebrities themselves.

At the January press conference, former president Minato stated that female announcers who had become celebrities often attended social gatherings with other celebrities and athletes. While some participated reluctantly and others out of curiosity, female announcers shared common concerns regarding these interactions.

== Other coverage ==
On January 29, NTV's morning program DayDay reported that Nakai and the woman were scheduled to meet at a social gathering. According to the program, Tsurube, Hiromi, Nakai, an executive, and the woman planned to play golf on that day, but Tsurube injured his back. The group instead held a barbecue at Nakai's house. Hiromi, who was in charge of the barbecue, reportedly had little interaction with the woman. As the weather grew cold, Hiromi and Tsurube left early. The incident between Nakai and the woman allegedly occurred a month later.

On January 30, the TBS program Hiruobi discussed the press conference held on January 27. Mamoru Nishiyama, Associate Professor at J. F. Oberlin University's School of Business Management, appeared as a guest. The discussion focused on the original reporting sources, comparing their reports with statements from Fuji TV and the individuals involved. Nishiyama questioned the authenticity of the reports and criticized the lack of a formal press conference by the media to apologize for any errors and their consequences. He also noted that if the investigation confirmed the executive's involvement, Fuji TV would need to take appropriate action.

On February 4, during a session of the House of Representatives Budget Committee, Minister for Internal Affairs and Communications Seiichiro Murakami stated that there was no reason to revoke Fuji TV's broadcasting license. He explained that licenses are granted only if a station has sufficient funds to maintain its operations, and the lack of funds after obtaining a license is not grounds for revocation under the Radio Law. Fuji TV continued to lose sponsors during this period.

On February 5, Yoshimoto Kogyo issued a statement regarding the self-restraint of its affiliated talent, without naming specific individuals. The agency represents Hitoshi Matsumoto, Nakai's co-host on Matsumo to Nakai (later renamed Dareka to Nakai). The statement noted: "We are currently investigating the facts with outside lawyers and others as we have found that some talents belonging to our company are suspected of non-compliance."

On March 31, 2025, during NTV's News Zero, anchor Sho Sakurai commented on the results of the third-party investigation. Speaking as an entertainer, Sakurai stated: "As someone who works in the entertainment industry, I would like to work with all the producers to make them aware of the voiceless voices, to prevent any damage from occurring."

== Aftermath of the scandal ==
=== Lack of advertisement and substitution with AC Japan commercials ===
Since the press conference on January 17, many sponsors, including Nippon Life and Toyota, suspended their commercials on Fuji TV due to the scandal.

These commercials were largely replaced by AC Japan advertisements, with exceptions such as Takasu Clinic and Very Best Law Office. According to FNN, from January 18 to 20, over 350 commercials were replaced, and by January 20, 75 sponsors had withdrawn their ads from Fuji TV and its affiliates. By January 25, over 120 companies had suspended advertising on the network.

The use of AC Japan commercials is a common practice to fill advertising slots when there are no paying sponsors.

The suspension and replacement of commercials caused several effects across Fuji TV programming:

- On Sazae-san, a long-running Sunday evening anime, the number of commercial sponsors decreased from eight on January 12, the week before the press conference, to four on January 19. Preview commercials, which are not normally aired, were also shown. By January 26, only Nishimatsuya's commercials were broadcast, but on January 28, Nishimatsuya also suspended its commercials. The Hasegawa Machiko Art Museum did not cancel its commercials.
- On Chibi Maruko-chan, also broadcast on Sunday evenings, the sponsor list was not displayed on the January 26 episode. Instead, still images from the main story were shown, including Maruko with a surprised expression after the opening and Maruko enchanted by a monster after the ending.
- The first episode of the Tuesday 9 drama Aishī ~Momentary Memory Investigation Hiigari Team~, broadcast on January 21, had no sponsor list displayed.
- NTT replaced Fuji TV's commercial slots across all group companies and postponed new advertising contracts for the time being.

Fuji TV President Kenji Shimizu reported that the network's broadcast revenue in February decreased by approximately 90% compared to the previous year, following the continued suspension of commercials in response to the Nakai-Fuji TV scandal. He stated that the outlook for April and beyond was uncertain, as it coincided with a period of program reorganization. According to Fuji TV, as of January, 311 companies and organizations had replaced their commercials with public service announcements. By February 25, only 72 companies continued to sponsor Fuji TV.

=== Companies that continue to support Fuji via their ads ===
One of the few individuals who continue supporting Fuji TV is Katsuya Takasu, owner of the cosmetic surgery provider Takasu Clinic. According to Takasu:

All the companies that have withdrawn their commercials from Fuji are non-owner companies. We don't discuss things internally like other companies. I make all my decisions based on what I like and dislike. To be honest, I have absolutely no interest in this recent Fuji TV commotion. I'm just a sponsor of Fuji's Sakagami Animal Kingdom because I like it. I'm not supporting the TV station; I'm supporting the show I like. That stance hasn't changed since the old days. I sponsored Matsu-chan (Matsumoto Hitoshi) because I liked him. There has been criticism, mainly on social media, about continuing to advertise on Fuji. But I don't care at all. I'm giving money to a show that everyone enjoys, so why should I be criticized? It's my money, not the viewers', so there's no reason for the internet to say anything about it. To me, it's like volunteering. I think the people who withdrew from sponsorship are small-minded.

According to a programming executive at a major commercial broadcasting station, producing a television program costs at least 8 million yen during prime time, and up to 40 million yen at the highest end. Fuji TV's programs are generally more expensive than those of other stations. Companies that continue to place commercials during this period provide crucial support for the network. An employee of a major advertising agency explained:

Television stations do not make official announcements about sponsors' movements, so the exact figures are not known, but currently only a handful of companies continue to place commercials on Fuji. Most of them are in the cosmetic surgery and mail-order industries, and they are unlisted companies.

=== Impact on FNS affiliate stations ===
Fuji Network System (FNS) affiliate stations have also been affected by the withdrawal of commercials from programs produced by Fuji TV. Kyushu Electric Power, Seibu Gas, and JR Kyushu announced on January 22 that they would take similar measures against FNS affiliate stations in the Kyushu region. In addition to replacing commercial slots, Kyushu Electric Power announced that it would postpone new advertising contracts for the time being.

On January 23, Nishi-Nippon Railroad, Kyudenko, and Fukuoka Financial Group announced similar measures, with Nishi-Nippon Railroad also postponing its appearance in programs produced by Fuji TV. Shikoku Electric Power (Yonden) announced on January 21 that it would replace advertising slots on FNS affiliate stations in the Chugoku and Shikoku regions. York-Benimaru also replaced its arrangements with FNS affiliated stations in the Tohoku region. In Hokkaido, Hokkaido Electric Power Company, Yotsuba Milk, and Hokkaido Bank made arrangements to suspend or replace commercials from Fuji TV programs broadcast by Hokkaido Cultural Broadcasting (UHB). Kansai Television also suspended commercial placements, spreading the impact further.

Even when FNS affiliate stations broadcast network programs produced by Fuji TV or other affiliates, sponsors who have stopped advertising on Fuji TV may still have their commercials aired as usual.

Sponsors of the same affiliate station may take different approaches. For example, when Osaka Gas and Kansai Electric Power withdrew their commercials from Kansai TV, KEPCO targeted only programs produced by Fuji TV, while Osaka Gas withdrew all contracted commercials, including locally produced programs.

In response, FNS stations issued statements. Hokkaido Cultural Broadcasting apologized, stating, "As a member of the Fuji TV network, we deeply apologize for the great concern we have caused to our viewers, business partners, and many other people." UHB reported that internal interviews with employees revealed no problems. TV Miyazaki announced it was conducting additional surveys to strengthen compliance, while TV Shizuoka said it was conducting an anonymous in-house survey to improve the workplace environment. Kagoshima Television Station expressed gratitude for viewer and client support despite the circumstances. Television Nishinippon Corporation also issued a statement during a program broadcast on January 22, apologizing and pledging to ensure transparent corporate management.

The Kansai TV Labor Union began questioning the future of President Ota, Chairman Fukui Sumiro, and former director and advisor Hisashi Hieda, urging employees to vote on establishing the right to strike. After the release of Fuji TV's third-party investigation results, the union demanded Ota's resignation. One employee stated:

We are already inviting employees to vote to establish the right to strike, and the deadline is 6 p.m. on the 8th of this month (April). If management does not resign by then, I think we will go on strike. There is significant anger among employees toward Mr. Ota and other management who have not stepped down despite being held accountable by a third-party committee.

Another employee added:

The union is increasingly concerned that if we miss this opportunity, we will not be able to regain trust. If the board of directors were functioning properly, we would not have to take this step, but currently there are no executives who can voice objections to Fukui's one-person control.

President Ota announced his resignation on April 4, 2025.

=== Impact on other stations (not FMH related) ===
Other stations also announced internal investigations to determine whether there were any inappropriate activities involving celebrities or sponsors. However, NHK Chairman Nobuo Inaba stated on January 22, 2025, that there are no plans to conduct an investigation at this time. According to Inaba, "NHK has a well-established harassment-related reporting system, and we are aware that there are no similar cases."

In 2018, former Tokio member Tatsuya Yamaguchi received a suspended sentence after being found guilty of indecent behavior with a high school-aged girl he met through an NHK E-TV program. The difference with the Fuji TV case is that NHK discovered and reported the incident. A weekly magazine reporter noted the similarities:

There was a suspicion of a cover-up on the part of NHK's program, and there were some reports that the victim protested to NHK, but NHK denied all of it. Yamaguchi learned the victim's contact information because the victim was told by the program staff to exchange contact information, but NHK did not hold a press conference or investigate through a third-party committee.

The TV Asahi Program Council held a meeting on February 20 to discuss the theme "What we should learn from Fuji TV's troubles." Some committee members expressed hope for change in the industry, stating:

A crisis is the greatest opportunity. I hope that this incident will lead to greater awareness and action to 'protect announcers and women,' and that people will say that 'the TV industry has become much safer and cleaner since then.'

In response, Chairman Hayakawa Hiroshi commented:

The unique feature of this incident is that the details of the case are confidential, so everyone is commenting blindly, and the seriousness of the trouble is not well understood. Many things escalated because Nakai was not asked about the situation. I realized that the most important thing was to understand the details of what had happened.

President Shinozuka Hiroshi added:

We established a human rights policy in February last year and are promoting human rights due diligence, but I realized once again that even if we put a system in place, it is important to put soul into it. We will create a workplace where everyone can work with peace of mind. We need to think carefully so that we do not allow distrust of the media to increase any further.

On December 23, 2025, an incident was reported involving the Tokyo Metropolitan Police Department Press Club, an NTV reporter, a female reporter, newspaper reporters and an NHK reporter. According to the post in Josei Seven Plus, the incident happened in July 2025, in a karaoke room after-party. Both the NTV and the female reporters supposedly told people around them that they were drunk and had no memory of the incident. The NTV reporter exposed his lower body and committed lewd acts against the female reporter, being cheered on by those in the party. The whole incident was filmed by the NHK reporter, and the video was allegedly seen by those in the room and others. The female reporter was deeply shocked that she was filmed. NTV answered about the incident:

In July of this year, a reporter from our news department became extremely drunk at a drinking party outside of work hours. Based on accounts from those involved, it is possible that other attendees engaged in inappropriate behavior toward the reporter while he was unconscious and asleep. We are currently investigating this. We have not confirmed that the reporter willingly engaged in such behavior or was involved in filming or leaking the video. However, the fact that the reporter became so drunk at the party that he lost his memory and slept in his underwear shows a gross lack of awareness as a reporter for a news organization, and the head of the news department has already severely reprimanded the reporter."

As for the NHK reporter, the network's answer was as follows:

After receiving an inquiry from an outside party, we have confirmed that it was a private event, and will refrain from providing a detailed response. The reporter deleted the video he filmed at the event, denies leaking it, and states that he did not engage in any inappropriate behavior. We have strictly instructed him to behave with responsibility as a member of the public media, both in his personal and professional lives. We urge him to reflect deeply as the year comes to an end.

"Many of our colleagues are angry at the company's reporters, who have been so harsh in their criticism of Masahiro Nakai and Johnny Kitagawa's sexual assault cases, and Taichi Kokubun's compliance violations. The atmosphere in the press club as a whole has become worse, and it's a nuisance," said a reporter in the social affairs department of a national newspaper.

=== Possible lawsuits ===
On January 30, 2025, FMH announced that it would revise its full-year earnings forecast for the fiscal year ending March 2025 downward. Fuji TV's new president, Kenji Shimizu, stated that net sales are expected to decrease by ¥50.1 billion, from ¥598.3 billion to ¥548.2 billion, and net profit by 66.2%, from ¥29.0 billion to ¥9.8 billion. Fuji Television's total broadcasting revenue is expected to decline by ¥23.3 billion. Fuji's 28 affiliates are projected to lose between ¥1.3 billion and ¥1.4 billion, with additional losses of ¥200 million to ¥300 million (approximately US$1.29 million to $1.93 million) expected. There is no guarantee that commercials will resume after the committee results are presented in March.

Attorney Masaki Kito noted the possibility that Nakai could be sued for compensation, though "depending on the nature of the act, the amount of [damages] will vary." Considerations include Nakai's involvement with the woman, Fuji TV's participation, and Bunshun's "corrected mistake." Kito stated, "It depends on the conclusion of the third-party committee, but it could be several billion yen to ¥10 billion in some cases."

According to lawyer Ryosuke Nishiwaki, former head of the TV Asahi legal department, a "shareholder derivative lawsuit" could follow if the economic situation continues. In such a case, shareholders (with a minimum of one share held for at least six months) can sue company officers on behalf of the company if it does not act within 60 days when the officers cause damage to the company. Officers are then required to compensate the company for the damages out of their personal assets. It is unclear how many defendants there could be in the case of Fuji TV/FMH; there were 15 directors, including Minato and Kano, who had already resigned. Compensation could amount to several billion yen divided among the defendants, and it is likely that directors' personal assets would not cover the full amount.

There is suspicion of a significant breach of duty among executives at the center of Fuji Television's management. The Companies Act requires directors to "immediately" report to the officer in charge of auditing when they "discover that there is a fact that may cause significant damage to the company." However, the outside director, the member of the Audit and Supervisory Committee, and the person in charge of compliance were not informed until the weekly magazine interview. The third-party committee report could serve as evidence in a lawsuit. Depending on its contents, it is conceivable that the company, under pressure from shareholders, could file a lawsuit against executives on its own without waiting for a shareholder derivative lawsuit.

=== Others affected ===
After learning on January 29 of his participation in the "Nakai barbeque," Tsurube was removed from his Sushiro commercial on January 30. He was also affected in relation to the BS11 program Mugaku Tsuru no Ma, originally scheduled to air on February 4, which was subsequently removed from the broadcast schedule. Tsurube had hosted the program for over 20 years at the Osaka comedy hall "Mugaku."

On February 6, Sushiro posted on its official website regarding the removal of Tsurube's advertisements. The post stated that, after apologizing for the inconvenience, the company had decided to remove the ads after learning of his participation in the barbeque, due to the unclear nature of the situation. Internal communications between the company and Tsurube's agency were subsequently held, after which the company decided to resume airing the commercials.

In August 2025, Masaharu Fukuyama's agency, Amuse Inc., reported that "in March of this year, we received a request for cooperation from the third-party committee established by Fuji Media Holdings" regarding Fukuyama's attendance at social gatherings hosted by then-Fuji TV executive director Ryo Ota. A Josei Seven magazine article had claimed that Fukuyama had refused to cooperate with the committee due to a busy schedule. The agency denied these allegations, stating that Fukuyama had submitted written responses to the committee's questions, in accordance with the report. The company explained that the report had not been published at the time due to its "extremely confidential" nature and referred readers to Fukuyama's comments provided in the magazine interview.

=== Third-party committee investigations ===
On February 4, it was announced that the third-party committee had begun its investigations. The committee started by examining the employees of Fuji Media Holdings and Fuji Television to determine whether other incidents similar to Nakai's had occurred. A second inquiry is planned to investigate the company's corporate culture. Officials questioned whether the investigation should be expanded to include other areas, such as production companies and external contractors.

On February 7, Kinliser announced via X (formerly Twitter) that it would resume running commercial ads in Fuji TV programming. The company stated that discussions had taken place with involved parties and that it was taking into account changes implemented by the broadcaster. However, it noted that some points remained controversial and that new information could emerge following the third-party committee's findings. The company also expressed hope that resuming the ads would encourage the broadcaster's employees to work diligently and maintain confidence in the future. Kinliser added that it would continue monitoring Fuji TV's activities.

On February 10, Fuji Media Holdings announced that it had established a "hotline exclusively for the third-party committee for external parties" to solicit information regarding similar cases between that day and February 24. This hotline is intended to collect information from former employees of Fuji Media Holdings and Fuji TV, as well as external parties who had dealings with the companies, regarding harassment incidents occurring at meetings hosted by the company from April 2016 onward.

=== March 31: Results of the third-party committee ===
On March 28, Fuji TV announced that it had received the results of the third-party investigation, contained in a 394-page report.

According to the report, Fuji TV, through the "Reconstruction and Reform Project" and the "Recurrence Prevention and Culture Reform Working Group," established directly under it, formulated a plan for the reconstruction and reform of the company. Fuji TV stated that it would revise the plan in accordance with the findings of the investigation. The company acknowledged serious deficiencies in its risk management that allowed incidents such as Nakai's to occur. In addition to reviewing regulations, rules, and organizational structures, the company noted the importance of transforming organizational and corporate culture. Fuji TV stated: "As a broadcasting company entrusted with the public airwaves, we must carefully grasp social changes and values, and continue to have a healthy social sense, a sense of responsibility, and a strong awareness of human rights."

Third-party committee head Akira Takeuchi compared the Fuji case with the Johnny & Associates case, which Fuji TV's news department (FNN) reported on. Takeuchi stated, "Fuji Television's news bureau is also part of the Fuji Television organization, and since Fuji Television has lost trust, I think there is a problem as to whether stakeholders will trust what the news department investigates (themselves)." Regarding the FNN-produced program The Sexual Assault Problem at the Former Johnny's Office and the Silence of the Media, Takeuchi said that the report was only a self-examination, and that Fuji did not conduct sufficient or objective verification, limiting what could be learned from it. He added: "I believe that it would not have been enough for Fuji TV's news bureau to examine this issue alone."

On April 1, the Japan Commercial Broadcasters Association (JBA) received the report from Fuji TV. In response, the JBA issued a written severe warning to Fuji TV on April 2. Ryunosuke Endo, president of JBA and former vice president of Fuji TV, resigned the same day. Until a new president is appointed, managing director Takuya Horiki will serve as acting president.

The former Fuji TV announcer who was the victim of the incident stated on April 1 through her attorney: "The damage I suffered will never go away, and what I have lost will never come back. I honestly feel relieved that my views were expressed in the investigation report. There are many facts I learned for the first time from the report, and I feel frustrated all over again." She added, "I sincerely hope that this kind of thing will disappear from society as a whole."

According to Josei Jishin, Nakai may not have known that the program cancellation was related to him, believing instead that it was due to Matsumoto. President Minato and Director Ota had received reports of the assault but had considered continuing the program until August 2023 to avoid speculation and protect the woman. The decision to end the program was made with the April 2025 reorganization. Nakai was informed by a programming executive with whom he was close and was told it was a comprehensive programming decision. Nakai was already aware of the Bunshun investigation.

On May 12, Nakai's legal team requested disclosure of the materials used to prepare the investigation report, including evidence used to determine that sexual violence occurred. They argued that the report lacked neutrality and fairness, severely damaging Nakai's honor and social status. Despite Nakai responding to the committee's hearing on March 9 for about six hours, the summary of his statements was barely reflected in the report. Although the report found Nakai guilty of "sexual violence," detailed interviews conducted by his attorneys found "no actual violent or coercive sexual acts commonly conjured up in the Japanese word 'sexual violence'." The legal team requested a sincere response from the committee to protect Nakai's human rights.

A subsequent request on May 30 by Nakai's team sought further clarification, including: (1) hearing records and evidence used in preparing the report, (2) evidence used to determine sexual violence occurred, and (3) materials showing the correspondence between evidence and findings. They also requested clarifications regarding (1) the WHO definition of "sexual violence," (2) the interpretation of "as an extension of work," (3) the scope and period of the committee's investigation, and (4) confidentiality misunderstandings. Nakai's team noted that there was no employment or supervisory relationship between Nakai and the woman as of June 2, 2023, and described the committee's handling of private interactions as a unilateral classification of "sexual violence." The committee responded on May 22 that it would refrain from disclosing the requested information, citing concerns that disclosure would "impair independence and neutrality." The deadline for the new request was set for June 6.

=== May 16, 2025: FMHD director candidates announced, Dalton proposal opposed ===
Fuji Media Holdings (FMHD) announced four new director candidates at its regular board meeting on May 16. None of the 12 candidates recommended by Dalton Investments were included. The announced candidates included 11 individuals, such as former FamilyMart president Sawada Takashi, former Mori Building director and senior managing executive officer and CFO Horiuchi Tsutomu, Fuji Television executive officer Yanagi Atsushi, and Hanada Saori of Atsumi Sakai Foreign Law Joint Enterprise. Dalton had proposed 12 candidates as shareholders, but none were included. FMHD also decided to oppose Dalton's proposal.

At a press conference following the board meeting, Fuji Television president Kenji Shimizu stated that the four candidates were the best suited to advance the company's management reform plan, including the creation of a human-rights–focused workplace. He explained the opposition to Dalton's proposal, saying, "The candidates proposed by the company are the best, and considering the desirable size of the board of directors, we have determined that it would not be appropriate to increase the number of directors."

Kondo Takami, president of NEXYZ.Group, a media advertising business and one of Dalton's proposed director candidates, told TBS, "I never thought they would remove Kitao. I think there's a high possibility that things will become a quagmire. Including the extraordinary general meeting of shareholders, this will definitely become a battle of some kind," indicating the possibility of an all-out confrontation between FMHD and Dalton ahead of the June shareholders’ meeting. Another related source stated that SBI chairman and Dalton candidate Kitao Yoshitaka was "furious" and added, "If things continue like this, there's no backing down."

== Impact on program productions ==
=== Impact on programs sponsored by a single company ===
Programs sponsored by a single company, including those broadcast on BS Fuji, a BS digital broadcasting station affiliated with Fuji Television, were also affected. As a result, Live News & Weather was organized as an alternative program starting on January 28. Ironically, Spot News, which had been discontinued at the end of March 2018, was revived for the first time in nearly seven years.

The status of programs sponsored by a single company is listed below.

Program names	Producing channel	Sponsor(s)	Solicitations, etc.	Source(s)
Kuishinbo! Bansai	Fuji TV	Kikkoman	Postponed/suspended	
Please, let me have delicious memories (おいしい記憶きかせてください)	BS Fuji	Kikkoman	Program moved to Kikkoman's YouTube channel from 15 February 2025	
Music Fair	Fuji TV	Shionogi Healthcare	Requested removal of company name from program; commercials replaced with AC Japan ads	
Minna no Keiba	Fuji TV	Japan Racing Association(JRA)	Suspension of commercial arrangements	
BS Super Keiba	BS Fuji	Japan Racing Association(JRA)	Suspension of commercial arrangements	
Promise with the Earth ~ Scenery etched in your heart ~ (地球との約束〜心に刻む景色〜)	Fuji TV	INPEX	Postponed/suspended	
Future Runners: 17 Futures (フューチャーランナーズ〜17の未来〜)	Fuji TV	MS&AD Insurance Group	Removal of sponsor display	
MLB Show-Time	Fuji TV	Dip Corporation	Sponsorship withdrawn; broadcast schedule changed to undecided	
Mom, Have Another Drink (おふくろ、もう一杯)	Fuji TV	Toyo Suisan	Postponed/suspended	
Street Corner Palette: Treasure for the Future (街角パレット〜未来へのたからもの〜)	Fuji TV	MIRARTH Holdings	Postponed/suspended	
1H Sense (1Hセンス)	Fuji TV	Mercedes-Benz	Postponed/suspended	

=== Impact on other programs ===
- The Fuji Sankei Group Advertising Grand Prix event was cancelled. According to its official site, the judging period was scheduled for late January to early February, with the ceremony planned for April.
- On January 31, 2025, it was announced that the FNS Music Festival, which was scheduled to air as a spring special in April, was cancelled due to a lack of sponsors. The program had been held for more than 50 years, featuring seasonal specials in spring, summer, and autumn.
- On February 3, 2025, it was reported that the show Run for Money was facing production difficulties. The program was affected by both a shortage of sponsors and restrictions on filming locations.
- On February 4, it was announced that the summer program FNS Day would be temporarily suspended due to uncertainty over funding and filming locations. That year's general emcee was expected to be a member of a popular idol group. An official stated, "We have begun informing some of the talents who were already scheduled to appear about the current situation." The program had aired annually since 1987, except for 2020 when it was cancelled due to the COVID-19 pandemic, and in 2021 and 2022 when it was replaced by FNS Laugh & Music. Former president Koichi Minato revived it in 2023. On February 21, Fuji TV officially announced the postponement of the broadcast, issuing a statement on its website apologizing to viewers.
- The July Wednesday drama slot was left uncertain. The series, with a police theme, was reportedly set to star Jun Matsumoto of Arashi.
- Programs previously featuring Masahiro Nakai were replaced across multiple networks. Fuji TV expanded Mr. Sunday into the time slot formerly occupied by Dareka to Nakai. TBS replaced Masahiro Nakai's Friday Smiles with Open the Door to Knowledge! Door × Door Quest. On TV Asahi, Nakai Masahiro no Doyoubi na Kai (2019–2024) was replaced by Wide! Scramble.
- The broadcaster WOWOW cancelled a planned February 21 airing of the film Watashi wa Kai ni Naritai, posting an apology on its website: "We have been broadcasting and streaming in accordance with company guidelines, but after considering customer feedback and the current situation, we have decided to cancel future broadcasts and streams."
- In the February 2 and 9 episodes of Sazae-san, sponsor credits were removed after Nishimatsuya withdrew its sponsorship.
- On February 17, 2025, Fuji TV suspended its comedy program Girigiri o Semeru Node Tsudzuku Dake Yarimasu Hōritsu Owarai without explanation. The official site stated that the date of the next broadcast had not been determined. Mitsuyo Ota, president of Titan—the agency representing the comedy duo Bakushō Mondai, which includes Hikaru Ota, the show's narrator—acknowledged the suspension on social media.
- The film Under Ninja appeared to benefit from the shortage of commercial slots, as Fuji replaced advertisements with public service announcements and in-house promotions, including ads for this movie. On February 12, director Yuichi Fukuda posted on X that audience numbers had "suddenly increased" since the previous weekend. By February 26, the film's box office revenue had surpassed 1 billion yen, although critical reception remained largely negative.

=== Commercial returns and comebacks ===
On June 14, 2025, Nikkan Gendai reported that sponsors might resume airing commercials after the broadcast of Fuji TV's July Monday drama. Companies such as Suntory, S.T., Kao, Menard, and Fujipan were expected to return to advertising following a months-long suspension. Of these, only Fujipan was reportedly hesitant to resume. In April, Takeshi Niinami, president of the Japan Association of Corporate Executives and chairman of Suntory Holdings, praised Fuji TV's measures to prevent a recurrence of past issues. Regarding the decision to resume advertisements, he stated that the final decision would be made after the shareholders' meeting on June 25. Government Chief Cabinet Secretary Hayashi also granted ministries and agencies permission to resume advertising at their discretion.

On July 28, 2025, several major companies resumed airing commercials on Fuji TV.

Meanwhile, Nippon Life, Suzuki, and JR Central stated that they had no plans to resume commercial broadcasts as of July.

As of September 27, 2025, about 40% of the sponsors Fuji TV had in 2024 had returned, the latest being Suntory Holdings, Toyota Motor Corporation, NTT DoCoMo, etc., which resumed in July. Meiji Yasuda Life Insurance and Japan Life Insurance were expected by the end of September, beginning of October. Mitsubishi Electric would return by October coinciding with the Fall restructuring.

== Corporate lawsuit ==
On August 28, 2025, Fuji Television filed a lawsuit in the Tokyo District Court against former president Koichi Minato and former Executive Vice President Toru Ota, alleging negligence in their management duties, including failure to conduct a thorough investigation and implement preventive measures. The company sought ¥5 billion (approximately US$34 million) in damages for their alleged mishandling of the scandal.

According to Kyodo News, the scandal—first revealed by a weekly magazine report in December 2024—triggered a mass withdrawal of sponsors. Fuji TV stated that it had suffered revenue losses as of the end of June. Meanwhile, The Japan Times and Reuters reported that the broadcaster alleged Minato and Ota failed to adequately respond to the case, including by not conducting a full investigation or establishing preventive measures when the alleged sexual assault was initially reported to management.

== Public opinion ==
The Mainichi Shimbun conducted a public opinion poll from February 15 to 16, 2025, regarding the recent series of issues at Fuji Television. When asked about the decision by multiple companies to suspend commercial airings on Fuji TV in response to the scandal, 58% of respondents said they "thought it was appropriate," while 16% said they "did not think it was appropriate," and 25% responded that they "could not say either way." When asked—using a multiple-choice format—what actions Fuji TV should take to regain public trust, the most common response, at 52%, was "replacing the management team." Other responses included "implementing measures to prevent recurrence" (48%), "clarifying allegations involving Fuji TV employees" (45%), and "disclosing the reality of entertainment activities involving female announcers and employees" (42%), each chosen by more than 40% of respondents. Twenty percent of respondents selected all four options, suggesting that the network would need to take comprehensive steps to restore credibility.

In response to the poll results, on February 25, manga artist Mayumi Kurata suggested that "if Fuji Television cannot attract sponsors, it should immediately bring to light stories that other media outlets are unwilling or unable to report." Kurata added, "As members of the media, I hope that those working in the field will treat this as a once-in-a-lifetime opportunity and report with the spirit of making their mark on the history of major media. I hope they will pull off a 'broadcasting accident' that will go down in history."

Following the coverage of the scandal, women began sharing personal experiences of power and sexual harassment on social media under the hashtag #私が退職した本当の理由 (Watashi ga taishoku shita hontō no riyū, That's the real reason I quit my job!), described as Japan's version of the #MeToo and the Weinstein effect. By February 8, just days after the first posts appeared, the number of testimonies had grown significantly. Women shared the realities behind resignation letters that often cited "personal reasons," revealing experiences of humiliation and harassment by superiors during business trips or in the early stages of their employment. Some accounts described harassment by male supervisors, while others detailed inaction by female supervisors who ignored reports. In certain cases, individuals who reported incidents were subsequently dismissed or transferred. Although the movement received widespread support, it also faced backlash, with some men criticizing women for speaking out.
