= Yasui Santetsu =

Yasui Santetsu may refer to:

- Yasui Santetsu (Yasui house), go player and head of the Yasui house between 1612 and 1644
- Shibukawa Shunkai (1639–1715), Japanese astronomer and go player originally named Yasui Santetsu
