= Tokyo Tower (film) =

- Theatrical release poster
- Directed by: Takashi Minamoto
- Screenplay by: Takashi Minamoto
- Based on: Tokyo Tower by Kaori Ekuni
- Produced by: Hirohito Watanabe; Seiji Okuda
- Starring: Junichi Okada; Hitomi Kuroki; Jun Matsumoto
- Cinematography: Kazuki Hakama
- Edited by: Mototaka Kusakabe
- Music by: Hajime Mizoguchi
- Distributed by: Toho
- Release date: January 15, 2005 (Japan)
- Running time: 125 minutes
- Country: Japan
- Language: Japanese

Tokyo Tower (Japanese: 東京タワー, Hepburn: Tōkyō Tawā) is a 2004 Japanese romance film written and directed by Takashi Minamoto. Its Japanese release was on January 15, 2005. The film is based on a bestselling novel by Kaori Ekuni. Junichi Okada plays a 21-year-old man who falls in love with a woman who is 20 years older, played by Hitomi Kuroki. The theme song is sung by Norah Jones.

== Plot ==
Toru, a 20-year-old man, falls in love with a woman who is not only married but also 20 years older. Complicating matters even further, she also happens to be a good friend of his own mother. She has all the possessions she could ever want. But something is missing.

The story unfolds in tandem with that of Toru's friend, Koji, who also falls in love with a married woman.

The two couples struggle to deal with the complexities of their choices in an effort to find a balance between the forces of love and the reality surrounding them.

== Cast ==
- Junichi Okada as Toru Kojima
- Hitomi Kuroki as Shifumi
- Jun Matsumoto as Koji
- Shinobu Terajima as Kimiko
- Kento Handa
- Aya Hirayama
- Rosa Kato
- Goro Kishitani
- Hiroyuki Miyasako
- Kimiko Yo
- Mylène Demongeot as the governess

== Reception ==
In 2005, Japan Times described Tokyo Tower as "wish fulfillment raised to the nth-power". In the review, critic Mark Schilling commended Junichi Okada's performance "on high burn, with welcome flashes of grit" as "a boy who plays the traditional girl's pining and sighing role, while stoutly resisting the usual label for his sort: gigolo". Schilling went on to argue that Shinobu Terajima had "the strongest performance" in the film as Kimiko, a desperate 35-year-old housewife having a parallel affair with a younger man, writing: "In conveying the touch of madness that descends on those truly in love, aged appropriately or no, she breathes real life into the film's gaudily lit tower of dreams."
