= Kuishinbo! Bansai =

- くいしん坊！万才
- Country of origin: Japan
- Original language: Japanese

Production
- Producer: Mae Ikuyoshi
- Running time: 5 minutes
- Production companies: Fuji Television; Kyodo Television

Original release
- Network: Fuji Television
- Release: October 2, 1974 – November 22, 2025

Kuishinbo! Bansai (くいしん坊！万才) is a five-minute Japanese cooking show aired by Fuji Television and other networks. The program is co-produced between Fuji Television and production company Kyodo Television. The program was broadcast at 5:25 pm JST.

== Overview ==
Broadcasting began on October 2, 1974 (Fuji TV's official website says it was June 1975, when the fixed reporters were hired). The program was sponsored for fifty years by Kikkoman, where each episode features a tour of famous dishes from all over Japan. Filming takes place not only in Japan but also overseas.

Due to the effects of the 2025 Fuji TV crisis motivated by scandals committed by Masahiro Nakai that were left unreported, Kikkoman was one of the companies that opted to withdraw from advertising on the network, prompting the program to be suspended for the first time in its history. On October 16th, Fuji TV announced that the show would end on November 22, 2025; the show will resume broadcasting on October 26th and two regular episodes will air in the following weeks prior to its formal conclusion.

== Reporters ==
No.	Reporter	Release	Episodes
1	Fumio Watanabe	1975–1977	515
2	Katsu Ryuzaki	1977–1978	390
3	Masanori Tomotake	1979–1981	794
4	Joe Shishido	1982–1983	509
5	Yūsuke Kawazu	1984	228
6	Tatsuo Umemiya	1985–1987	623
7	Takenori Murano	1988–1990	617
8	Takuro Tatsumi	1991–1993	606
9	Shinji Yamashita	1994–1997	782
10	Kai Shishido	1998–1999	284
11	Shuzo Matsuoka	2000–2025	

== Specials ==
A 40th anniversary special was broadcast on August 22, 2015. A repeat of the February 1, 1987 episode aired on December 15, 2019, due to the death of Tatsuo Umemiya. The episode showcased hikizuri udon from Takabatake, Yamagata. A few weeks later, on January 26, 2020, following the death of Jo Shishido, an older episode (dated January 28, 1982) showcasing yukedake from Matsumae, Hokkaido was broadcast.
