= Hana (film) =

Hana (Hana yori mo Naho - 花よりもなほ)
- Directed by: Hirokazu Kore-eda
- Written by: Hirokazu Kore-eda
- Produced by: Nozomu Enoki; Shiho Sato; Hijiri Taguchi
- Starring: Junichi Okada; Rie Miyazawa
- Cinematography: Yutaka Yamasaki
- Edited by: Hirokazu Kore-eda
- Distributed by: Shochiku (Japan); Funimation (USA)
- Release date: June 3, 2006
- Running time: 127 minutes
- Country: Japan
- Language: Japanese

Hana - the Tale of a Reluctant Samurai, known in Japan as Hana yori mo Naho (花よりもなほ), is a 2006 Japanese jidaigeki by director Hirokazu Kore-eda. The film was released in the United States by Funimation who also gave it an English-language dub.

== Story ==
The story takes place over one year during Japan's Genroku era, beginning at the start of 1702.

A young and inexperienced samurai, Aoki Sozaemon, has come from Matsumoto to Edo. Living in a slum, he waits to locate and take revenge against his father's killer, to restore honor to his clan's name. However, his impoverished, revenge-driven life takes a negative toll on him, as does his discovery that his intended victim, another low-status samurai, has a wife and young children. Eventually, Soza must decide: to kill, or not kill?

Making up the backdrop of the film are the many other residents of the slum, including children, the landlord, a group putting on an amateur play, as well as a young widow, Osae, with whom Soza becomes romantically involved.

Unbeknownst to everyone, also living in the slum are a small group of samurai, members of The 47 Ronin, hiding and planning before their revenge attack on Kira Yoshinaka's mansion. This occurs one year later at the climax of the film.

== Cast ==
- Junichi Okada as Sōzaemon "Sōza" Aoki
- Rie Miyazawa as Osae
- Tadanobu Asano as Jubei Kanazawa
- Arata Furuta as Sadashiro
- Susumu Terajima as Kichiemon Terasaka
- Teruyuki Kagawa as Jirozaemon Hirano
- Jun Kunimura as Isekan
- Seiji Chihara as Tomekichi

== Reception ==
Film critic Andrew Thayne of the Asian Movie Pulse said that "Koreeda makes an unconventional take on the samurai film, as a young samurai struggles with his role as both samurai and son."
