= Flowers in the Shadows =

- Film poster
- Directed by: Yuichiro Hirakawa
- Based on: Kagehinata ni Saku by Hitori Gekidan
- Starring: Junichi Okada; Aoi Miyazaki; Atsushi Itō; Aya Hirayama; Tamaki Ogawa; Takashi Tsukamoto; Toshiyuki Nishida; Tomokazu Miura
- Music by: Hiroyuki Sawano
- Release date: January 26, 2008 (Japan)
- Running time: 129 minutes
- Country: Japan
- Language: Japanese
- Box office: ¥1.95 billion

Flowers in the Shadows (Japanese: 陰日向に咲く, Hepburn: Kagehinata ni Saku) is a 2008 Japanese drama film directed by Yuichiro Hirakawa.

== Cast ==
- Junichi Okada
- Aoi Miyazaki
- Atsushi Itō
- Aya Hirayama
- Tamaki Ogawa
- Takashi Tsukamoto
- Toshiyuki Nishida
- Tomokazu Miura
- Toshie Negishi
- Kami Hiraiwa
- Tomoko Ikuta

== Reception ==
The film grossed ¥1.95 billion in Japan.
