= Dareka to Nakai =

Japanese television program

Dareka to Nakai (だれかtoなかい), formerly known as Matsumo to Nakai (まつもtoなかい) was a talk variety show that was broadcast every Sunday from 21:00 to 21:54 (JST) on Fuji Television and other FNS stations from April 30, 2023, to December 15, 2024, starring Masahiro Nakai.

It was originally hosted by Hitoshi Matsumoto and Nakai, but due to Matsumoto taking a break from his entertainment activities, the program was renamed to Dareka to Nakai and co-hosted by Kazunari Ninomiya and Tsuyoshi Muro.

== Overview ==
A program where the host matches two celebrities he wants to meet, and holds face-to-face talks.

Two special programs titled “Matsumo to Nakai~Matching Night~” were broadcast on November 21, 2020, and February 19, 2022, in the “Saturday Premium” slot, it became a regular program starting in April 2023. The program's title was changed to Matsumo to Nakai and it aired every Sunday at 9:00 pm. Since becoming regular, it was basically a 1-hour with no 2 hour special program.

In the first regular broadcast, Nakai and guest Shingo Katori, Nakai's co-member in SMAP, co-starred for the first time in six years. Views on on-demand platforms (TVer/FOD) reached 2.49 million times in one week, 2.45 million times were on TVer alone, making it the highest ever recorded figure for a Fuji TV variety show, and the most popular variety show of all time among all commercially broadcast variety shows.

On January 8, 2024, Yoshimoto Kogyo announced that Matsumoto, would be suspending his activities indefinitely, due to sexual assault allegations. The programs that had already been recorded in 2023 were under consideration of air time. The show scheduled to be broadcast on January 14, aired, but after that, the broadcast had not yet been decided. On this occasion, only one sponsor's commercial aired with mention, while the other sponsors aired their commercials withdrawing their name from the sponsorship list. On January 21, it was announced that Masahiro Nakai would be the sole MC starting on January 28, while having guests co-hosts on the program.

At the end of the January 28 show, the name change to Dareka to Nakai was announced. Furthermore, on the 31st, it was announced that Arashi's Kazunari Ninomiya, recently independent (in October 2023) from Smile-Up (formerly Johnny & Associates), and who was a guest on the show on January 28, would appear regularly as the new co-host. On February 16, at Fuji TV's regular press conference, president Koichi Minato said about future co-hosts, "It is possible that people will get a sense of the meaning of the title and will be rotated". On the April 14 show, Tsuyoshi Muro was announced as the new MC, relieving Ninomiya from hosting duties.

=== Cancellation and effect of the scandal ===
On December 12, 2024, it was reported that the program would end in March 2025. Tsuyoshi Muro would end his hosting duties on December 1, 2024, and that on January 12, 2025, Junichi Okada, former member of V6, and Nakai's junior from the Johnny's era, would become the third partner. However, due to reports regarding Nakai's sexual abuse scandal, the broadcast on January 12, which was Okada's debut episode, was to be replaced. But, on the 8th, the broadcast from the 12th was suspended for the time being. In the end, it was officially decided that the program would end on January 22, 2025. The broadcast on December 15, 2024, became the de facto final episode. On January 23, 2025, Nakai announced that he would retire from the entertainment industry.

According to the report of the third-party investigation result by Josei Jishin, it is possible that Nakai did not know that the cancellation of the program was because of him, but because of Matsumoto, as he was told this. President Minato and Director Ota had already received the report of the assault from the female, but had considered to continue with the program by August 2023, because the sudden cancellation would cause speculation and could hurt her. When she left is when the decision to end the program with the April 2025 reorganization was taken. Nakai was informed of the decision by the programming executive with whom he was close, and Nakai asked him if it was because of him. The executive told him it was a comprehensive programming decision. Nakai was already aware of Bunshun's investigation.
