= Josei Seven =

Women's magazine published by Shogakukan

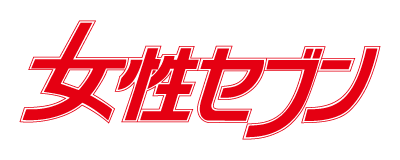
Josei Seven logo

Josei Seven (Japanese: 女性セブン, Hepburn: Josei Sebun) is a weekly women's magazine published by Shogakukan, released every Thursday. The main content is articles related to the imperial family and celebrities, but there are also pages for news articles and reader submissions.

From the second half of 1998 to the second half of 2023, it claims to have been the number one weekly magazine for women in circulation for 25 consecutive years.

== History and scandals ==
The magazine was first published in April 1963, at a time marked by economic growth as Japan was nearing the 1964 Summer Olympic Games as well as the increase in the number of marriages by love.

By the 2000s, it had become famous for reporting on scandals. In 2006, lawyer Yuko Sumita sued the publication for posting false articles about dieting. On September 25, 2009, he lost the appeal and was ordered to pay compensation of 100,000 yen. Between 2007 and 2012, it received complaints and corrections from the Imperial Family due to misinformation on their behalf.

In the October 10, 2013 issue, the magazine carried an article with the title "Radioactive contamination from China and South Korea: This food is dangerous!", where it discovered that radioactive substances were detected in agricultural products in 17 prefectures including Niigata Prefecture. The report resulted in a protest from the Niigata Prefectural Office, causing Shogakukan to publish an apology statement on October 24. On July 27, 2016, the Tokyo District Court issued a lawsuit against the publisher, Shogakukan, and the photographer for causing mental distress by publishing a secretly taken photo of Akina Nakamori inside her home in the issue released on November 7, 2013. The court ordered Josei Seven to pay 5.5 million yen, and the photographer received a summary order from the Tokyo Summary Court for violating the Misdemeanor Act (voyeurism).

The December 19, 2024 issue had information on Masahiro Nakai's troubles with women. It was reported that Nakai had paid a settlement of approximately 90 million yen, and that Fuji Television employees were also involved. The following week, Shūkan Bunshun followed suit, and Josei Seven continued reporting on the matter. All of Nakai's regular programs were terminated, and as of January 20, 75 companies had stopped placing commercials on Fuji Television. On January 23, Nakai announced that he would retire from entertainment activities on the same date.
