= Jōkyō calendar =

Japanese lunisolar calendar

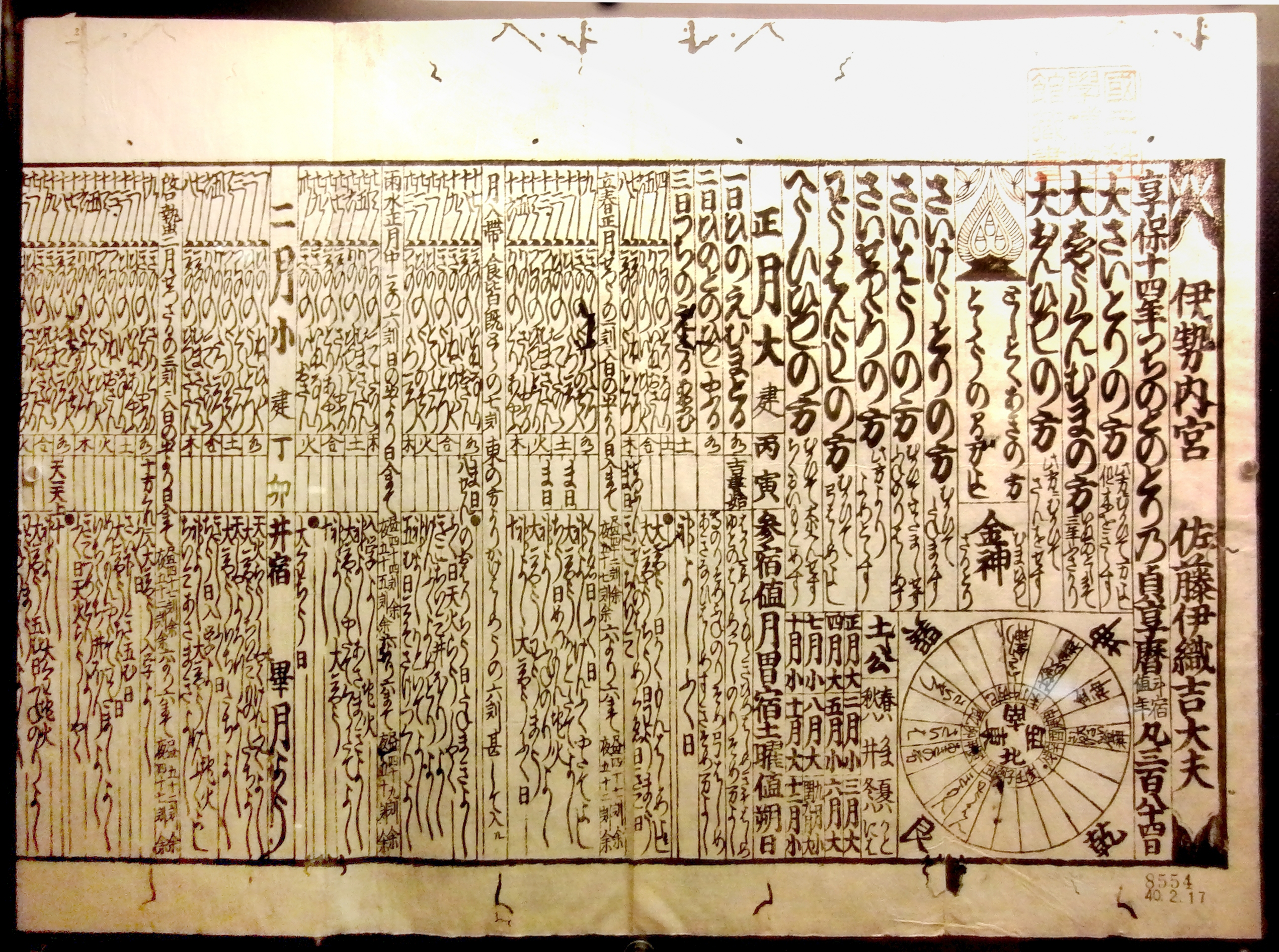
Jōkyō calendar published in 1729. Exhibit in the National Museum of Nature and Science, Tokyo, Japan.

The Jōkyō calendar (貞享暦, Jōkyō-reki) was a Japanese lunisolar calendar, in use from 1684 to 1753. It was officially adopted in 1685.

== History ==
The Jōkyō-reki system was developed and explained by Shibukawa Shunkai. He recognized that the length of the solar year is 365.2417 days.

Shibukawa discovered errors in the traditional Chinese calendar, the Senmyō calendar, which had been in use for 800 years.

== See also ==
- Japanese calendar
- Sexagenary cycle
- Jōkyō
