= Shibukawa Shunkai =

Japanese scholar, go player and astronomer

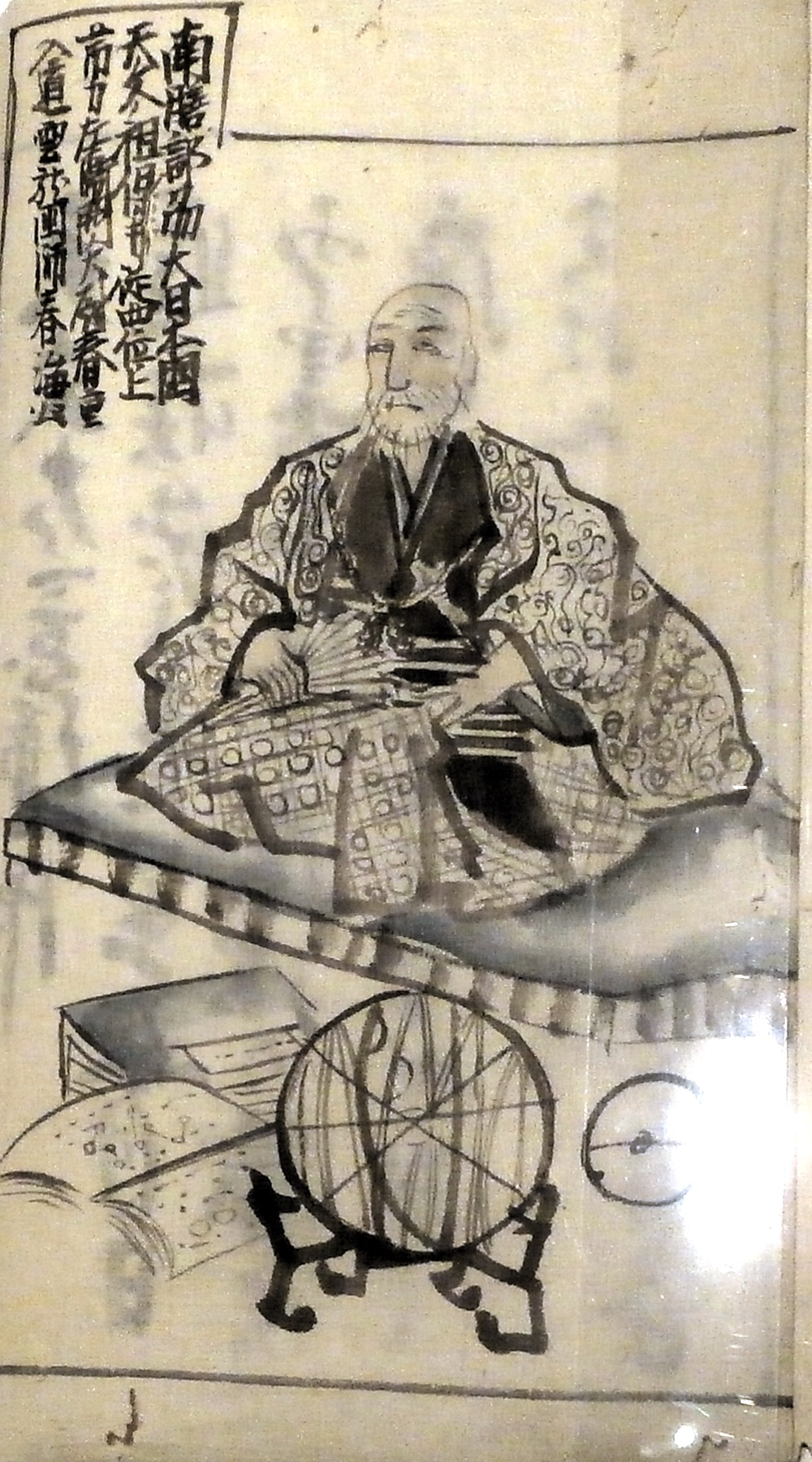
Shibukawa Shunkai

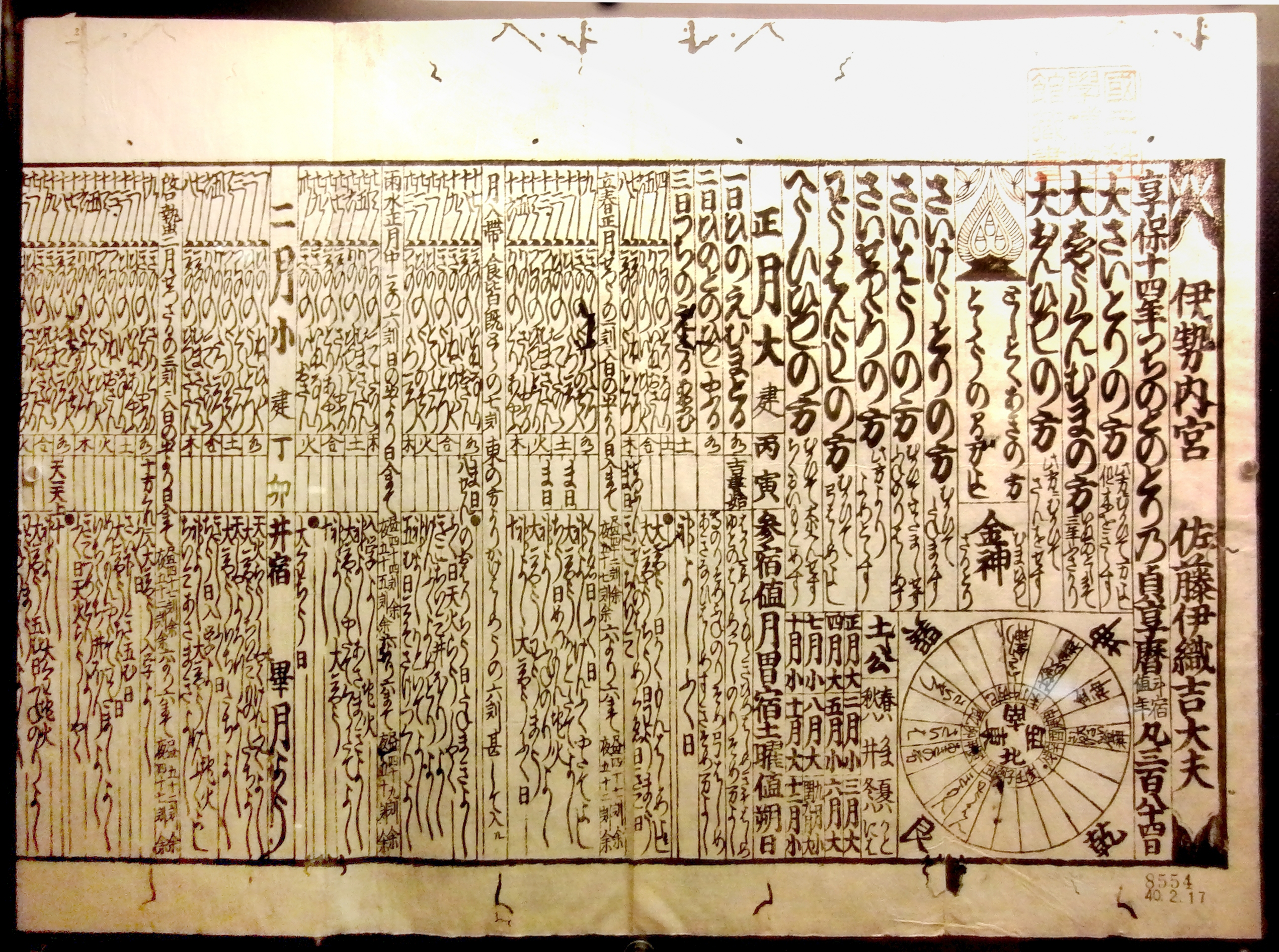
Jōkyō calendar published in 1729. Exhibit in the National Museum of Nature and Science, Tokyo, Japan.

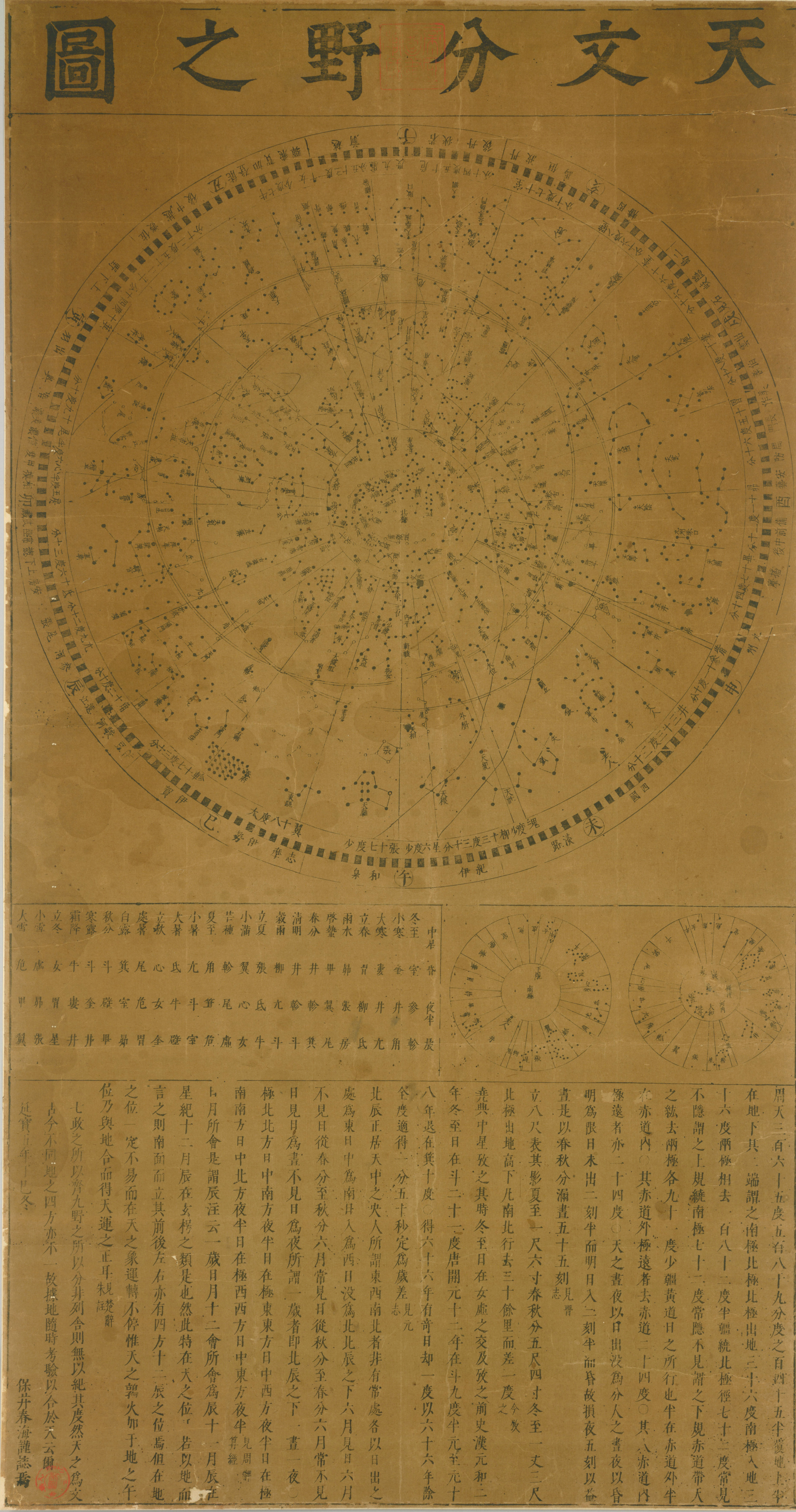
"Tenmon Bunya no Zu", written by Shibukawa Shunkai in 1677. "Tenmon Bunya no Zu" means star chart.

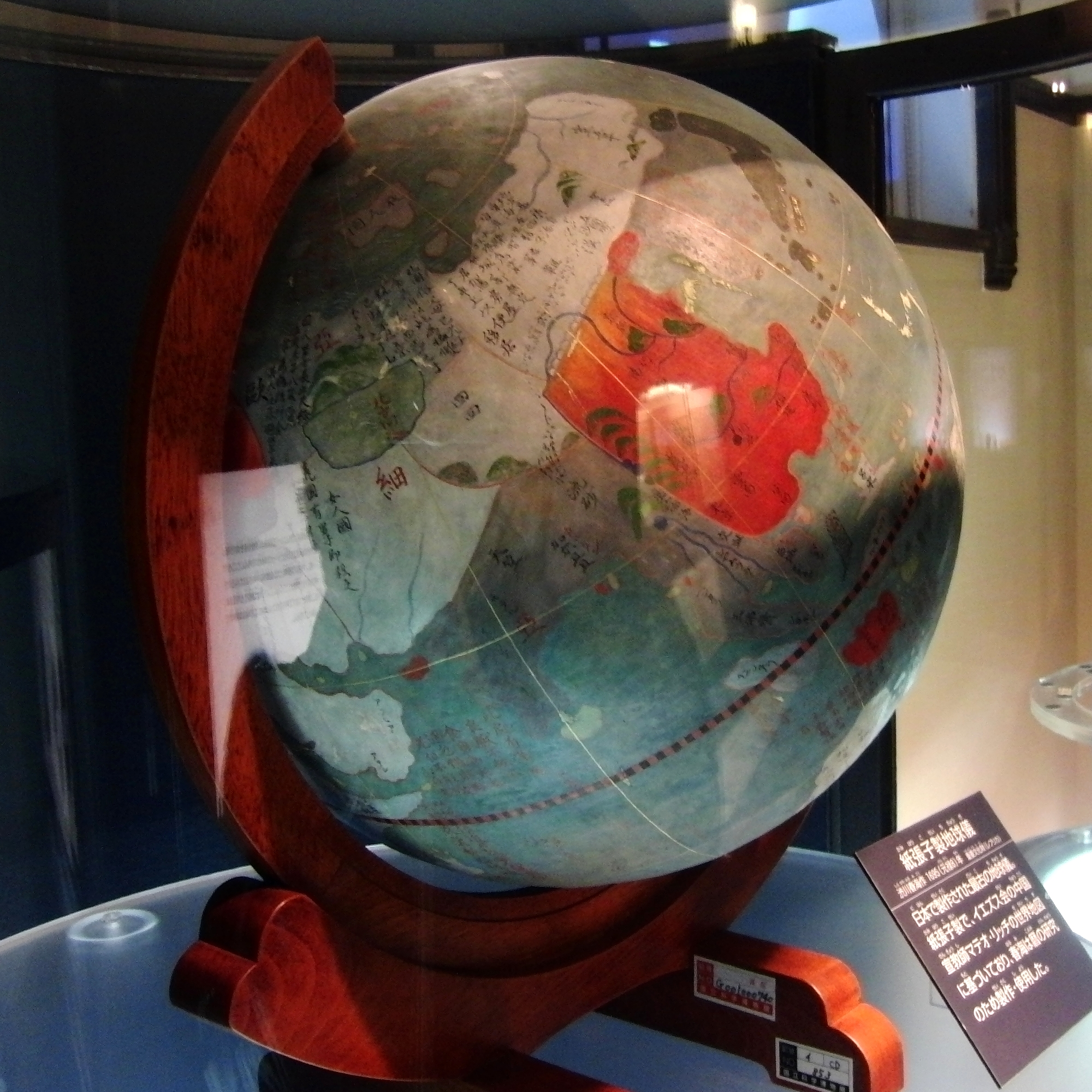
Papier-mache globe created by Shibukawa Shunkai in 1695. One of the Important Cultural Properties of Japan. Exhibit in the National Museum of Nature and Science, Tokyo, Japan.

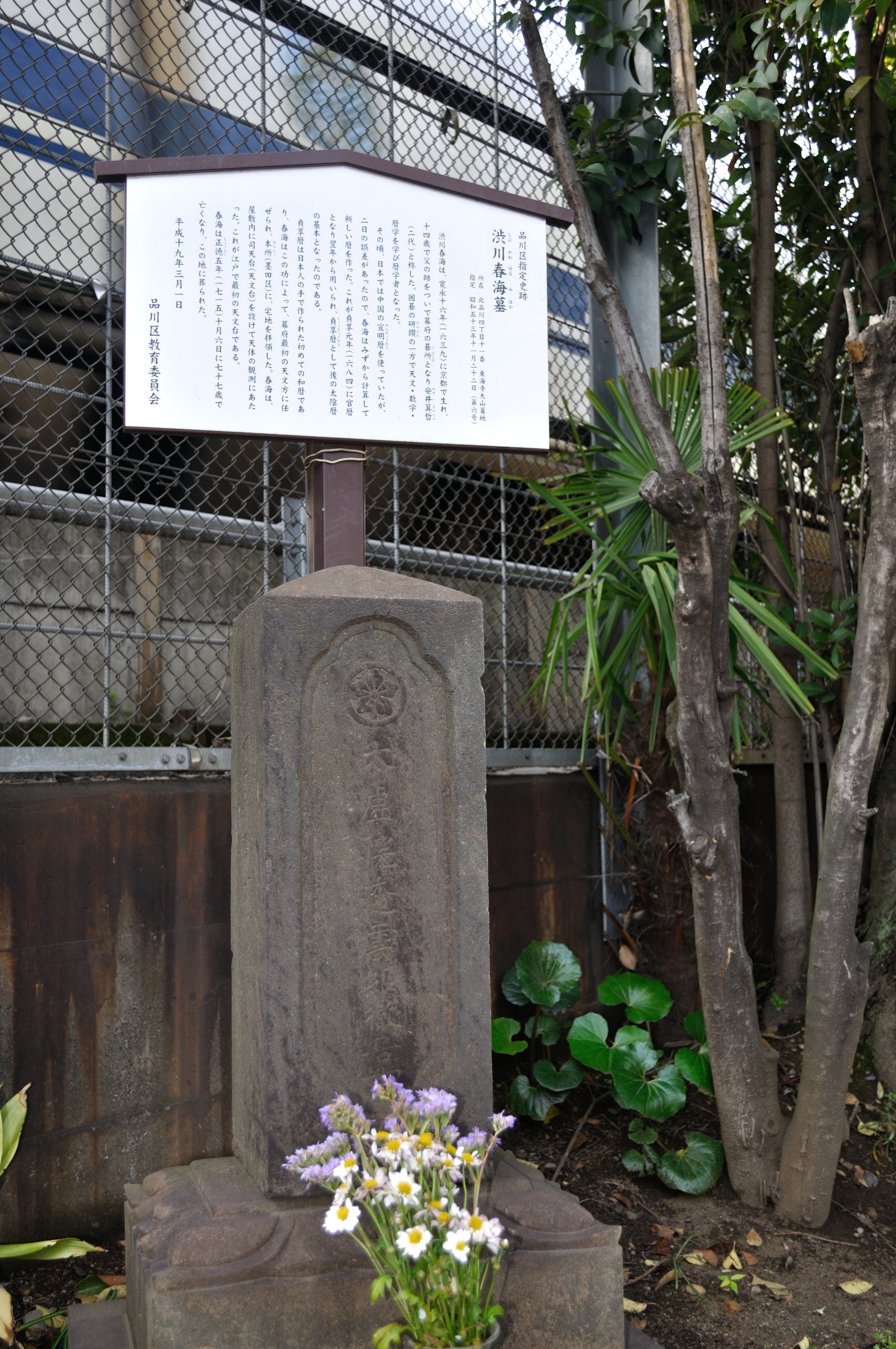
Shunkai's grave at Tokyo

Shibukawa Shunkai or Shibukawa Harumi (渋川 春海, December 27, 1639 – November 1, 1715) born as Yasui Santetsu (安井 算哲), later called Motoi Santetsu (保井 算晢), was a Japanese scholar, go player and the first official astronomer appointed of the Edo period. He revised the Chinese lunisolar calendar at the shogunate request, drawing up the Jōkyō calendar which was issued in 1684 during the Jōkyō era. In 1702, he changed his name to Shibukawa Sukezaemon Shunkai and retired by 1711. As a go player, he was affiliated with the Yasui house, calling himself initially (after his father) Yasui Santetsu II. He is mentioned as a Tengen player in Yamashita Keigo's book: Challenging Tengen.

Shibukawa Shunkai (as Yasui Santetsu) is the central character in the 2012 film Tenchi: The Samurai Astronomer by Yōjirō Takita.
