= KAT-TUN discography =

- Studio albums: 11
- Extended plays: 1
- Live albums: 12
- Compilation albums: 1
- Singles: 28
- Video albums: 12
- Music videos: 29
- Mini-albums: 1
- Digital downloads: 1

This is the discography for Japanese boy band KAT-TUN.

== Albums ==
=== Studio albums ===
Title	Album details	Peak chart positions		Certifications (sales thresholds)
Title	Album details	JPN	KOR	Certifications (sales thresholds)
Best of KAT-TUN	Released: March 22, 2006; Label: J-One (JACA-5038); Format: CD	1	—	750,209 (Triple Platinum)
Cartoon KAT-TUN II You	Released: April 18, 2007; Label: J-One (JACA-5055~5056); Format: CD	1	—	500,000 (Double Platinum)
KAT-TUN III: Queen of Pirates	Released: June 4, 2008; Label: J-One (JACA-5099~5100); Format: CD	1	—	282,402 (Platinum)
Break the Records: By You & For You	Released: April 29, 2009; Label: J-One (JACA-5142, JACA-5143); Format: CD	1	—	250,000 (Platinum)
No More Pain	Released: June 16, 2010; Label: J-One (JACA-5224, JACA-5226); Format: CD + DVD, CD	1	12	182,563 (Gold)
Chain	Released: February 22, 2012; Label: J-One (JACA-5301/5302, JACA-5303); Format: CD + DVD, CD	1	18	133,262 (Gold)
Come Here	Released: June 25, 2014; Label: J-One (JACA-5415, JACA-5417); Format: CD + DVD, CD	1	—	100,000 (Gold)
CAST	Released: July 18, 2018; Label: J-One (JACA-5734-5735/5736-5737/5738); Format: CD + DVD, CD	1	—	139,203 (Gold)
IGNITE	Released: July 31, 2019; Label: J Storm; Format: CD + DVD, CD	1	—	116,739 (Gold)
Honey	Released: March 29, 2022; Label: J Storm; Format: CD + DVD, CD + Blu-ray, CD	1	—	110,366 (Gold)
Fantasia	Released: February 15, 2023; Label: J Storm; Format: CD + DVD, CD + Blu-ray, CD	1	—	102,463 (Gold)

=== Mini-albums ===
Title	Album details	Peak chart positions	Certifications (sales thresholds)
Title	Album details	JPN	Certifications (sales thresholds)
Kusabi (楔 -kusabi-)	Released: November 27, 2013; Label: J-One (JACA-5384/5385, JACA-5386/5387, JACA-5388); Format: CD + DVD, CD	1	189,338 (Gold)

=== Compilation albums ===
Title	Album details	Peak chart positions	Certifications (sales thresholds)
Title	Album details	JPN	Certifications (sales thresholds)
KAT-TUN 10th Anniversary Best ″10Ks!″	Released: March 22, 2016; Label: J-Storm (JACA-5585~5587, JACA-5588~5590, JACA-5591~5592); Format: CD + DVD, CD	1	209,095 (Gold)

== Singles ==
Year	Title	Peak	RIAJ Certifications (sales thresholds)	Album	Ref
Year	Title	JPN	RIAJ Certifications (sales thresholds)	Album	Ref
2006	"Real Face"	1	1,046,125 (Million)	Best of KAT-TUN	
2006	"Signal"	1	569,527 (Double Platinum)	Cartoon KAT-TUN II You	
2006	"Bokura no Machi de"	1	558,491 (Double Platinum)	Cartoon KAT-TUN II You	
2007	"Yorokobi no Uta"	1	373,965 (Platinum)	KAT-TUN III: Queen of Pirates	
2007	"Keep the Faith"	1	459,919 (Platinum)	KAT-TUN III: Queen of Pirates	
2008	"Lips"	1	421,902 (Platinum)	KAT-TUN III: Queen of Pirates	
2008	"Don't U Ever Stop"	1	447,971 (Platinum)	Break the Records: By You & For You	
2008	"White X'mas"	1	291,184 (Platinum)	Break the Records: By You & For You	
2009	"One Drop"	1	331,248 (Platinum)	Break the Records: By You & For You	
2009	"Rescue"	1	377,097 (Platinum)	Break the Records: By You & For You	
2010	"Love Yourself (Kimi ga Kirai na Kimi ga Suki)"	1	439,736 (Platinum)	No More Pain	
2010	"Going!"	1	283,168 (Platinum)	No More Pain	
2010	"Change Ur World"	1	264,303 (Platinum)	Chain	
2011	"Ultimate Wheels"	1	250,000 (Platinum)	Chain	
2011	"White"	1	174,332 (Gold)	Chain	
2011	"Run For You"	1	179,296 (Gold)	Chain	
2011	"Birth"	1	250,000 (Platinum)	Chain	
2012	"To the Limit"	1	170,296 (Gold)	Come Here	
2012	"Fumetsu no Scrum"	1	175,936 (Gold)	Come Here	
2013	"Expose"	1	173,400 (Gold)	Come Here	
2013	"Face to Face"	1	150,310 (Gold)	Come Here	
2014	"In Fact"	1	160,192 (Gold)	Non-album single	
2015	"Dead or Alive"	1	205,500 (Gold)	Non-album single	
2015	"Kiss Kiss Kiss"	1	166,122 (Gold)	Non-album single	
2016	"Tragedy"	1	144,954 (Gold)	Non-album single	
2016	"Unlock"	1	217,454 (Gold)	Non-album single	
2018	"Ask Yourself"	1	152,988 (Gold)	CAST	
2021	"Roar"	1	267,508 (Platinum)	Honey	
2021	"We Just Go Hard" feat. AK-69/ "Euphoria"	1	250,000 (Platinum)	Honey	

== Digital singles ==
Year	Download details
2013	Bounce Girl: Limited period song download; Exclusive to Music.jp; Released: August 29, 2013; Format: Digital download
2022	Crystal Moment: Released: February 4, 2022; Format: Digital download
2022	Zero Kara Ichi He: Released: February 4, 2022; Format: Digital download

NOTE:
All of the singles that were released from 2006 until 2016, except for the song Bounce Girl, were included in the first two discs of all the versions of the compilation album titled KAT-TUN 10TH ANNIVERSARY BEST "10Ks!". Bounce Girl was only included in the Disc 3 of the 1st Limited Version of the said compilation album as part of the selected songs by KAT-TUN fans.

== Videos ==
Year	Video details	Peak		Certifications (sales thresholds)
Year	Video details	Music DVD	Overall DVD	Certifications (sales thresholds)
2003	Okyakusama wa Kamisama - Concert 55man nin Ai no Request ni Kotaete (お客様は神サマーConcert 55万人愛のリクエストに応えて！！): Released: February 26, 2003; Label: Johnny's Entertainment (JEBN-19); Format: DVD	1	1	172,926 (Gold)
2005	KAT-TUN Live Kaizokuban (KAT-TUN Live 海賊帆): Released: May 3, 2005; Label: J-Storm (JABA-5008); Format: DVD	1	1	400,758 (Platinum)
2006	Real Face Film: Released: March 22, 2006; Label: J-Storm (JABA-5011); Format: DVD	1	1	500,000 (Double Platinum)
2006	Dream Boys: Released: June 28, 2006; Label: J-Storm (JABA-5012); Format: DVD	1	1	179,722 (Gold)
2007	Live of KAT-TUN "Real Face": Released: April 11, 2007; Label: J-Storm (JABA-5016~5017); Format: DVD	1	1	240,627 (Platinum)
2007	Tour 2007 Cartoon KAT-TUN II You: Released: November 21, 2007; Label: J-Storm (JABA-5029~5030, JABA-5031~5032); Format: DVD	1	3	227,640 (Platinum)
2009	KAT-TUN Live Tour 2008 Queen Of Pirates: Released: January 1, 2009; Label: J-Storm (JABA-5044~5045); Format: DVD	1	1	207,400 (Platinum)
2009	KAT-TUN Live Break the Records: Released: December 16, 2009; Label: J-Storm (JABA-5062~5064, JABA-5065~5066); Format: DVD	1	1	198,672 (Gold)
2010	KAT-TUN~No More Pain~World Tour 2010: Released: December 29, 2010; Label: J-Storm (JABA-5074~5076, JABA-5077~5078); Format: DVD	1	1	120,437 (Gold)
2012	KAT-TUN LIVE TOUR 2012 CHAIN TOKYO DOME: Released: November 21, 2012; Label: J-Storm (JABA-5105~5106); Format: DVD	1	1	78,938
2014	Countdown Live 2013 KAT-TUN: Released: May 14, 2014; Label: J-Storm (JABA-5116~5117); Format: DVD	1	1	66,267
2015	KAT-TUN LIVE TOUR 2014 come Here: Released: April 22, 2015; Label: J-Storm (JABA-5136~5139, JABA-5140~5143, JABA-5144~5145); Format: DVD	1	1	100,000 (Gold)
2015	KAT-TUN LIVE 2015 QUARTER in Tokyo Dome: Released: October 14, 2015; Label: J-Storm (JABA-5151~5153, JABA-5154~5155); Format: DVD	1	1	68,148
2016	KAT-TUN 10th Anniversary Live Tour ″10Ks!″: Released: August 17, 2016; Label: J-Storm (JABA-5164~5166, JABA-5167~5168); Format: DVD	1	1	100,000 (Gold)
2019	KAT-TUN Live Tour 2018 Cast: Released: April 17, 2019; Label: J-Storm (JABA-5333~5335, JAxA-5084~5085); Format: DVD, Blu-ray	1	1	76,755
2020	KAT-TUN Live Tour 2019 Ignite: Released: April 8, 2020; Label: J-Storm (JABA-5373~5374, JAXA-5112~5113); Format: DVD, Blu-ray	1	1	
2021	15th Anniversary Live KAT-TUN: Released: November 24, 2021; Label: J-Storm; Format: DVD, Blu-ray			
2022	KAT-TUN Live Tour 2022 HONEY: Released: November 2, 2022; Label: J-Storm; Format: DVD, Blu-ray			
