= Come Here (KAT-TUN album) =

Studio album by KAT-TUN
- Released: June 25, 2014
- Recorded: 2014
- Genre: Pop rock
- Length: 63:13 (Limited Edition); 71:44 (Regular Edition)
- Label: J-One
- Producer: Johnny H. Kitagawa (executive)

KAT-TUN chronology
Kusabi (2013)	Come Here (2014)	Cast (2018)

Singles from Come Here
- 1. "To the Limit" Released: June 27, 2012; 2. "Fumetsu no Scrum" Released: September 12, 2012; 3. "Expose" Released: February 6, 2013; 4. "Face to Face" Released: May 15, 2013

Come Here, stylised as come Here, is the seventh full-length studio album and eighth original album by Japanese boy band KAT-TUN, released in Japan on June 25, 2014, under the label J-One Records. The album contains four previously released tracks—"To the Limit", "Fumetsu no Scrum", "Expose" and "Face to Face"—all of which were number one on the Oricon weekly singles chart.

== Album information ==
Come Here is the eighth original album release from KAT-TUN, released approximately seven months after their previous original album Kusabi. The release comes in two versions - Regular Edition and Limited Edition.

The stylised version of the album's title, "come Here", has only the "H" in capitals to signify the H for KAT-TUN fans named "hyphens", that concerts are their "home", that they have matured into adults ("H" can be read as ecchi), and finally because "H" is the eighth letter of the alphabet and it is their eighth overall album.

Both versions of the album include four previously released singles, four solo songs, and eight new songs. The Regular Edition contains two extra bonus tracks, "Sunrise" and "Yasashii Ame (優しい雨)". The Limited Edition contains a DVD containing the music video and making for the lead track, "Come Here".

== Promotion ==
The singles contained in the album were all released prior. However, they have been rearranged to exclude the vocals of former group member Koki Tanaka. "To the Limit" was released as the first single on June 27, 2012. It peaked at number one on the Oricon weekly singles chart and sold over 156,300 copies in Japan. The second single "Fumetsu no Scrum" was released on September 12, 2012, which peaked at number one on the weekly Oricon singles chart, selling over 157,000 copies in Japan.

On February 6, 2013, "Expose" was the third single released from the album. It peaked at number one on the weekly Oricon singles chart and sold over 154,700 copies in Japan. On May 15 the same year, the fourth single "Face to Face" was released. It peaked at number one on the weekly Oricon singles chart and sold over 131,800 copies in Japan. "In Fact", which was the last single released before the album, on June 4, 2014, is not included.

In conjunction with the release of Come Here, the group will embark on a summer nationwide tour in Japan starting July 8, 2014. The tour will be their first as four members, and ends at Kyocera Dome on December 30 and 31, 2014, making it two consecutive years that the group performs a countdown concert at the dome.

== Track listing ==
Limited edition
No.	Title	Lyrics	Music	Length
1.	"Come Here"	Rucca	Ichiro Suezawa, Drew Ryan Scott, Goldfingerz	4:01
2.	"Triangle"	Noyce'	Shun Kusakawa, L-m-T, Daichi	3:56
3.	"Expose"	Miwa*	Erik Sahlen, Yoko Hiramatsu	4:33
4.	"Art of Life" (Vocal by Tatsuya Ueda)	Mz Hz	Thomas Klintstrom, KAZ-AKI, DJ Air	3:59
5.	"Fumetsu no Scrum"	Masanco	Janne Hyoty, Caroline Gustavsson	3:29
6.	"Crescent" (クレセント, Vocal by Yuichi Nakamaru)	Yuichi Nakamaru, Winess	Filip "LeForce" Lindfors, Yoko Hiramatsu	3:40
7.	"Fake" (フェイク)	Forest Young	Daichi, Shunsuke Harada	3:23
8.	"Break UR Cage"	Kahlua	Manabu Marutani, Katsuhiko Yamamoto, Command Freaks	3:21
9.	"Emerald" (Vocal by Kazuya Kamenashi)	Kazuya Kamenashi	Daishi Dance	3:50
10.	"Star"	Koudai Iwatsubo	Koudai Iwatsubo	5:00
11.	"Whenever I Kiss You" (Vocal by Junnosuke Taguchi)	Nao	Nao	4:05
12.	"Summer Emotion"	Rabbitman, Noyce'	Rabbitman	4:01
13.	"To the Limit"	M.U.R., Masanco	Tom Diekmeier, Junior H Johansson	4:07
14.	"Hide and Seek"	Miyakei	Forest Young, Pinkcastar	3:48
15.	"Face to Face"	AGKY	Andreas Johansson, Laika Leon	4:23
16.	"My Every Time"	Rucca	JongSung Yoon, JungSuk Jang, TaeSoo Jung	3:29
17.	"Come Here" (Music video)
18.	"Come Here" (Making of clip)

Regular edition
No.	Title	Lyrics	Music	Length
1.	"Come Here"	Rucca	Ichiro Suezawa, Drew Ryan Scott, Goldfingerz	4:01
2.	"Triangle"	Noyce'	Shun Kusakawa, L-m-T, Daichi	3:56
3.	"Expose"	Miwa*	Erik Sahlen, Yoko Hiramatsu	4:33
4.	"Art of Life" (Vocal by Tatsuya Ueda)	Mz Hz	Thomas Klintstrom, KAZ-AKI, DJ Air	3:59
5.	"Fumetsu no Scrum"	Masanco	Janne Hyoty, Caroline Gustavsson	3:29
6.	"Crescent" (クレセント, Vocal by Yuichi Nakamaru)	Yuichi Nakamaru, Winess	Filip "LeForce" Lindfors, Yoko Hiramatsu	3:40
7.	"Fake" (フェイク)	Forest Young	Daichi, Shunsuke Harada	3:23
8.	"Break UR Cage"	Kahlua	Manabu Marutani, Katsuhiko Yamamoto, Command Freaks	3:21
9.	"Emerald" (Vocal by Kazuya Kamenashi)	Kazuya Kamenashi	Daishi Dance	3:50
10.	"Star"	Koudai Iwatsubo	Koudai Iwatsubo	5:00
11.	"Whenever I Kiss You" (Vocal by Junnosuke Taguchi)	Nao	Nao	4:05
12.	"Summer Emotion"	Rabbitman, Noyce'	Rabbitman	4:01
13.	"To the Limit"	M.U.R., Masanco	Tom Diekmeier, Junior H Johansson	4:07
14.	"Hide and Seek"	Miyakei	Forest Young, Pinkcastar	3:48
15.	"Face to Face"	AGKY	Andreas Johansson, Laika Leon	4:23
16.	"My Every Time"	Rucca	JongSung Yoon, JungSuk Jang, TaeSoo Jung	3:29
17.	"Sunrise"	25→graffiti	Rock Stone, Steven Lee, Jimmy Richard	3:53
18.	"Yasashii Ame" (優しい雨 "Gentle Rain")	Nai-T、Kahlua	Nai-T	4:35

== Charts ==
Chart	Peak	Sales
Japan Oricon Weekly Chart	1	75,026
Japan Oricon Monthly Chart	4	75,026
Japan Oricon Yearly Chart	48	88,080
Billboard Japan Top Albums	1	__
