= Tatsuya Ueda =

Japanese idol, singer, and actor (born 1983)

Tatsuya Ueda 上田竜也
- Born: October 4, 1983 (age 43)
- Origin: Kanagawa, Japan
- Genre: J-pop
- Occupations: Singer–songwriter; actor; TV host; radio host
- Instruments: Vocals; piano
- Years active: 1998–present
- Label: J-One Records
- Formerly of: KAT-TUN; B.B.A.; M.A.D.; B.B.D.; Toshi Otoko Unit
- Website: Tatsuya Ueda's Official site Tatsuya Ueda Starto Entertainment profile

Tatsuya Ueda (上田 竜也, Ueda Tatsuya; born October 4, 1983), is a Japanese singer and actor under Starto Entertainment. Born in Kanagawa in Japan. He joined the Japanese talent agency Johnny & Associates in 1998. In March 2006 he debuted as a member of KAT-TUN, group to which he belonged until its disbanding in April 2025. The group's name was an acronym based on the first letter of each member's family name, until the departure of Jin Akanishi (2010), Koki Tanaka (2013) and Junnosuke Taguchi (2016), after that, Ueda took the T's for TaTsuya. Since 2016 until the end, KAT-TUN's name stood for Kazuya KAmenashi, TaTsuya Ueda, and Yuichi Nakamaru. Ueda is also an amateur boxer.

== Group participation ==
- B.B.A.
- M.A.D.
- B.B.D.
- KAT-TUN
- Toshi Otoko Unit
- MOUSE PEACE (Solo concert's band)

== Career ==
Joined Johnny & Associates after the audition on June 22, 1998. In 2001, he was grouped up as KAT-TUN for NHK program "Pop Jam" to backdance for Kinki Kids' Koichi Domoto. He debuted as part of KAT-TUN with the release of "Real Face" single on March 22, 2006.

On September 8–21, 2008, he held his first solo concert tour called "MOUSE PEACE". A new version of his solo concert tour, "MOUSE PEACE uniting with FiVe TATSUYA UEDA LIVE 2010", was held from August 4 – October 3, 2010. He announced in his Instagram and fan club that, after 13 years, he would have his solo tour "MOUSE PEACE 2024", which took place starting in Zepp Sapporo on January 6, 2024.

In 2009, he first starred as Romeo in stage play "Romeo and Juliet," at Tokyo Globe Theatre (March 4–29, 2009) and Sankei Hall Breeze (April 2–5, 2009). In addition, in April, he debuted in Fuji TV drama series "Konkatsu!". In October 2013, it was announced that Ueda would be starring in a stage play in 2014, titled "Tōmin suru kuma ni soine shite goran". It was Ueda's stage comeback since "Romeo and Juliet".

In October 2011, Ueda announced his second drama series, "Runaway~Aisuru Kimi no Tame ni" on TBS. He was reported to shave his head during a scene in the drama. In May 2012, Ueda announced his third drama series, "Boys on the Run" on TV Asahi.

Long time member of the so-called "Aniki Kai", a group of Johnny's who admire Arashi's Sho Sakurai, Ueda had the opportunity in 2022 to work with his "Aniki", for the first time, in the series "Nemesis", protagonized by Sakurai, as Kensho Hoshi, a strange craftsman with a mysterious shop, who gets to work with Sakurai's Naoki Kazama. He reprised his role in 2023's movie version. Ueda reported in an Instagram post on December 10, 2023 that he and Sakurai were working on a pair of songs for his solo concert tour "MOUSE PEACE 2024". The name of the songs had not yet been revealed, but was released later.

== Other activities ==
=== Boxer ===
Ueda is an amateur boxer. He has been interested in boxing since around 2007. His boxing activities have been reflected in both drama and sports and variety programs.

=== Social Networking ===
Ueda started using Instagram on February 14, 2023, a month after fellow KAT-TUN member Kamenashi and a month before Nakamaru. He is the only one who posted in English in their opening post, in which he shared an image of himself and his dog. Further posts with co-stars, friends and KAT-TUN members, like the one on March 22, KAT-TUN's debut anniversary, have been in Japanese, with some including phrases in English.

=== Writer ===
Ueda penned his first novel, "Kono koe ga todoku made", based loosely on his life. According to Ueda, he started writing when KAT-TUN's third member had decided to leave, around 2015. He began recording his feelings as a member, before deciding to make it a novel. He had done around 2/3 of the work, when he consulted the agency, who would discourage him from continuing. With the changes in the agency and his own work structure, he thought that he might be able to continue, so he went and consulted the agency again. As he continued writing, now his feelings about the group's disbandment were also included. The main character, Ryu, embodies aspects of Ueda's personality and life, as he mentioned in a comment. With the end of KAT-TUN, the book's characters' many challenges, worries and struggles, shared with friends, reflect Ueda's thoughts on friendship and dreams. He hopes that the book is read by people in group activities around the world, as well as fans and other people who support them. The novel was released on June 27, 2025. Ueda held a talk event in Tokyo (July 1), and handing-over events in Tokyo, Osaka and Aichi (July 2, 3 and 6) to celebrate the release.

== Filmography ==
=== Television ===
- 2000 – Kowai Nichiyoubi (NTV, episode 8, episode 15)
- 2001 – Shijou Saiyaku no Date
- 2009 – Konkatsu! (Fuji TV) – Kuniyasu Amamiya
- 2011 – Runaway ~Aisuru Kimi no Tame ni~ (TBS) – Kuya Takimoto
- 2012 – Boys on the Run (TV Asahi) – Ryuu Andou
- 2017 – Shikaku Tantei Higurashi Tabito (NTV) – Tsuruta Kamekichi
- 2017 – Shinjuku Seven (TV Tokyo) – Nanase
- 2019 – Setsuyaku Rock (NTV) – Takao Matsumoto
- 2021 – Nemesis (NTV) – Kensho Hoshi
- 2024 - Mars:Zero's revolution (TV Asahi) - Masaru Enjo (episode 5)

=== Film ===
- 2013 – The Eternal Zero
- 2023 – Nemesis: The Mystery of the Golden Spiral, Kensho Hoshi
- 2026 – Tokyo Burst: Crime City, Kaito

== Stage plays ==
- "Shock" musicals
  - Millenium Shock (2000)
  - Show geki Shock (2001, 2002)
  - Shock is Real Shock (2003)
  - Endless Shock (2024)
- Dream Boy musicals
  - Magical Musical Dream Boy (2004)
  - Hey! Say! Dream Boy (2005)
  - KAT-TUN vs Kanjani 8 Dream Boys(2006)
- Romeo and Juliet (2009)
- Tōmin suru kuma ni soine shite goran (冬眠する熊に添い寝してごらん) (2014)
- Aoi Hitomi (青い瞳) (2015)
- After Life (2023)
- The Dinner Table Detective (2025) (Musical play)
- The Talented Mr. Ripley (2026)
- Knockin' on Locked Door (2026)

== Solo concerts ==
- Tatsuya Ueda Live 2008 「Mouse Peace」 (September 8–21, 2008, at Johnnys Theatre)
- Mouse Peace uniting with FiVe TATSUYA UEDA LIVE 2010 (August 4 – October 3, 2010, 7 performances in 5 cities)
- Mouse Peace 2024 (January 6, 2024, "All Zepp" nationwide tour starting in Zepp Sapporo)
- Mouse Peace 2024 1st Bite (October 31, 2024, Pacifico Yokohama)
- Mouse Peace 2025 2nd Bite (October 29–30, 2025, Tokyo Yoyogi National Stadium 1st Gymnasium)

== Discography ==
=== Solo songs and Duets ===
Year	Title	Details
2006	Butterfly	Duet with former KAT-TUN member Jin Akanishi. Featured in album Best of KAT-TUN
2007	Lost	Featured in album Cartoon KAT-TUN II You
2008	Ai no Hana	Featured in single Don't U Ever Stop
2009	Hana no Mau Machi	Featured in album Break the Records: By You & For You
2010	Rabbit or Wolf?	Featured in album No More Pain
2010	NEET Man ニートまん	Featured in single Change Ur World
2012	~Again	Featured in album Chain
2013	Monster Night	Featured in mini-album Kusabi
2014	Art of Life	Featured in album Come Here
2015	Arigatou	Duet with Kamenashi Kazuya. Featured in single Kiss Kiss Kiss
2019	World's End	Featured in album CAST

=== EPs ===
- ギリスト! LCDA-0084 (release on February 7, 2024) (digital and streaming) (opened at 1st. place on the weekly Oricon chart for digital albums, with 6293 downloads)
1. ギリスト! (Girist) (co-written with Sho Sakurai)
2. 光射す方へ (Hikari sasu kata e) (co-written with Sho Sakurai)
3. カンタービレ (Cantabile)
4. Lollipop
5. ヤンキー片想い中 (Yankī kataomoi-chū)
6. 花の舞う街 (Hana no mau machi)

== Books ==
- Kono koe ga todoku made release: June 27, 2025 (novel, ISBN 978-4-04-115953-8)

== Awards ==
Years	Awards
2009	TVNavi Magazine Awards [Summer 2009]: Best Newcomer for "Konkatsu!"
