= Junnosuke Taguchi =

Japanese singer

Junnosuke Taguchi 田口 淳之介
- Also known as: Junno
- Born: November 29, 1985 (age 40); Sagamihara, Kanagawa, Japan
- Genre: J-pop
- Occupations: Singer-songwriter; actor; model
- Instrument: Vocals
- Years active: 1999–present
- Label: J-One Records (2006–2016) Immortal (2016–2017) Universal J (Present)
- Formerly of: KAT-TUN
- Website: junnosuke-t.com www.universal-music.co.jp/taguchi-junnosuke/

Junnosuke Taguchi (田口 淳之介, Taguchi Junnosuke; born November 29, 1985) in Sagamihara, Kanagawa, Japan), is a singer-songwriter, actor, and model. He is a former member of the Japanese idol group KAT-TUN.

He joined the talent agency Johnny & Associates in 1999 and officially debuted as part of KAT-TUN in 2006. Apart from activities as a member of KAT-TUN, he has acted in the film Mohōhan, alongside SMAP's leader Masahiro Nakai, and appeared in several dramas, most notably hit drama Legal High.

After leaving KAT-TUN and Johnny & Associates began a career as a solo artist (first single release in November 2016) and also began doing some modeling.

In 2017 announced signed an exclusive two-year contract with Universal Music Group. A single will be released April 2017 and will be his solo artist major label debut.

== History ==
Taguchi officially joined Johnny & Associates in May 1999. He was selected to join KAT-TUN when it formed in 2001, and subsequently debuted with the group in 2006.

In 2001, he made his first appearance in a drama, in Omae no Yukichi ga Naiteiru. In 2005, he had his first drama lead role when he replaced agency mate Hiroki Uchi, who was temporarily suspended from activities, in Ganbatte Ikimasshoi.

Announced in 2015 that he would leave KAT-TUN and his management company. Final performance with KAT-TUN was in March 2016. In September 2016, Taguchi opened his official website to announce the launch of his solo career. His first single, "Hero", was released in November 2016.

Started runway model work in March 2017 as well with his appearance in the Kobe Collection Fashion Show S/S 2017. Currently he is a print model for pnck.jp clothing and also announced print model work for Hombre Nino clothing in the 2017 season.

In April 2017, he had his major label solo debut single with Universal Music Group with "Connect". In June of the same year, he released his first photo book, titled Junnosuke Taguchi's Photo Collection in the Moon (田口 淳之介写真集 On the Moon, Taguchi Junnosuke Shashinshu On the Moon).

On May 22, 2019, Taguchi was arrested along with his girlfriend, actress Rena Komine, for marijuana possession.

== Personal life ==
Taniguchi announced via his YouTube account on September 22, 2026, that he had married an ordinary woman and that they had already welcomed the birth of their first child, a son. On November 12 he shared a video with her, being the first time she appeared without her face covered. They also shared the opening of official Instagram accounts.

== Appearances ==
=== Dramas ===
- Omae no Yukichi ga Naiteiru (2001) as Haruki Hijikata
- Shounen wa Tori ni Natta (2001)
- Ganbatte Ikimasshoi (2005) as Saburō Nakata
- Happy! (2006) as Keiichirō Ōtori
- Happy!2 (2006) as Keiichirō Ōtori
- Hanayome to Papa (2007) as Seiji Miura
- Yūkan Club (2007) as Granmanie Bidō
- Kochira Katsushikaku Kameari Kōenmae Hashutsujo (2009) as Kakunoshin Araki
- Inu o Kau to Iu Koto ~Sky to Wagaya no 180-nichi~ (2011) as Katsuhiko Hotta
- Legal High (2012) as Ranmaru Kaga
- Osozaki no Himawari ~Boku no Jinsei, Renewal~ (2012) as Kaoru Aoyama
- Legal High SP (2013) as Ranmaru Kaga
- Nanatsu no Kaigi (2013) as Hiromitsu Saeki
- Legal High Season 2 (2013) – Ranmaru Kaga
- Kyouwa Kaisha Yasumimasu (2014) as So Oojiro

=== Movies ===
- Mohōhan: Copycat Killer (2002) as Shinichi Tsukata

=== Stage plays ===
- No Words, No Time ~Sora ni Ochita Namida~ (2013)
- Forrest Gump (2014) as Forrest

=== TV programs ===
- Kyōkun no Susume (2014–present) Regular guest

=== Radio ===
- Tokyo-FM Tag-Tune Driving Host
- KAT-TUN no Gatsūn Co-host

=== Commercials ===
- Lotte
  - Sou
  - Crunky (2002)
  - Plus X (2003)
- Rohto
  - Mogitate Kajitsu (2005, 2007, 2008)
  - Rohto C Cube (2005)
  - Sesera (2006)
- SKY Perfect JSAT Corporation
  - SKY PerfecTV! (2006)
  - SKY PerfecTV Premium Service (2006)
- NTT DoCoMo
  - New 9 Series (2006)
  - FOMA903i (2006)
- GungHo Online Entertainment
  - Puzzle & Dragons Z (2013)

== Discography ==
=== Solo artist discography ===
Date	Details	Title	Peak Oricon Position
November 2, 2016	Single-3 versions	Hero	1-Oricon Indie Chart-November 14, 2016
2019	Cosmos City		

=== Solo songs as a KAT-TUN member ===
Year	Title	Details
2007	Samurai Love Attack	Featured in album Cartoon KAT-TUN II You
2008	Natsu no Basho (夏の場所)	Featured in single Don't U Ever Stop
2009	Wind	Featured in album Break the Records: By You & For You
2010	Love Music	Featured in album No More Pain
2010	Girls (NTT presented by Junnosuke Taguchi)	Featured in single Change Ur World
2012	Finale	Featured in album Chain
2013	Flash	Featured in single Face to Face
2014	Whenever I Kiss You	Featured in album Come Here

== Awards and recognitions ==
- 2007: 11th Nikkan Sports Drama Grand Prix: Runner-up for Best Supporting Role for Yūkan Club
- 2008: 5th TVNavi Magazine Awards: Best Newcomer for Hanayome to Papa
