= Yuichi Nakamura (disambiguation) =

Yuichi Nakamura may refer to:

- Yūichi Nakamura (actor) (born 1987), Japanese actor active from 2003 to 2011 and from 2014 to present
- Yuichi Nakamura (voice actor) (born 1980), Japanese voice actor

== See also ==
- Yuichi Nakamaru, Japanese singer-songwriter and presenter
