= Kaitō Yamaneko =

- Genre: Drama
- Written by: Shōgo Mutō
- Directed by: Ryūichi Inomata; Ryō Nishimura; Naoko Komuro
- Starring: Kazuya Kamenashi; Hiroki Narimiya; Suzu Hirose
- Opening theme: Antonín Dvořák "Symphony No. 9" the fourth movement
- Ending theme: "Unlock" by KAT-TUN
- Country of origin: Japan
- Original language: Japanese
- No. of series: 1
- No. of episodes: 10

Production
- Producers: Hibiki Itō; Yūta Fukuo; Jun Shimoyama
- Running time: 54 minutes

Original release
- Network: NTV
- Release: January 16 – March 19, 2016

Kaitō Yamaneko (怪盗 山猫; English title "The Phantom Thief Yamaneko") is a Japanese television drama series that premiered on NTV on 16 January 2016. It is based on the mystery novel by Manabu Kaminaga, who is known for Psychic Detective Yakumo. Kazuya Kamenashi, a member of the musical group KAT-TUN, played the lead role. Suzu Hirose and Hiroki Narimiya appeared in supporting roles. The first episode received a viewership rating of 14.3%.

== Cast ==
- Kazuya Kamenashi as Yamaneko, a thief and a private detective
- Hiroki Narimiya as Hideo Katsumura, a copywriter
- Suzu Hirose as Mao Takasugi
- Nanao as Sakura Kirishima, a detective
- Hiroyuki Ikeuchi as Katsuaki Inui, a detective
- Kuranosuke Sasaki as Shūgo Sekimoto, a detective chief inspector
- Shizuka Nakamura as a mysterious woman

Preceded by Okitegami Kyōko no Bibōroku (October 10, 2015 - December 12, 2015)	NTV Saturday Dramas; Saturdays 21:00 - 21:54 (JST)	Succeeded by Omukae desu April 2016 -
