= Kusabi =

EP by KAT-TUN
- Released: November 27, 2013
- Recorded: 2013
- Genre: Pop rock
- Length: 49:56
- Label: J-One
- Producer: Johnny H. Kitagawa (executive)

KAT-TUN chronology
Chain (2012)	Kusabi (2013)	Come Here (2014)

Kusabi (楔-kusabi-; "Wedge") is the first mini album and seventh original album by Japanese boy band KAT-TUN, released in Japan on November 27, 2013, under the label J-One Records. The title track "Kusabi" was used as the theme song for the drama Henshin Interviewer no Yūutsu starring KAT-TUN member Yuichi Nakamaru and actress Fumino Kimura, while "Gimme Luv" was used in a Suzuki Solio Bandit television commercial.

Kusabi debuted at the number one spot top the Oricon weekly album chart, selling over 168,209 copies in its first week of release. The album is KAT-TUN's seventh consecutive album to achieve number one, putting them in a tie with singer Hikaru Utada for most consecutive album number ones in Oricon chart history. Kusabi sold 10,917 copies in its second week, 3,442 copies in its third week and 1,832 copies in its fourth week. The album has sold 189,338 copies so far.

== Album information ==
Kusabi is the first mini album release from KAT-TUN, released approximately one year and nine months after their previous studio album Chain. All of the tracks included on the album are new, with none having been released in singles. The release comes in three versions - Regular Edition, Limited Edition 1, and Limited Edition 2.

All versions of the album include "Kusabi", "Gimme Luv", "On & On", and "Fire and Ice". The Regular Edition contains seven tracks, with "Bless", "4U" and "Phoenix" included. The Limited Edition 1 has a total of six tracks, with "Boku Nari no Koi" and "Monster Night", a solo by KAT-TUN member Tatsuya Ueda, and a DVD containing the music video and making for "Kusabi", and the music video for "Monster Night". Limited Edition 2 contains five tracks, with "Fantastic Planet" as the only additional track, and a DVD containing the music video for "Gimme Luv".

== Promotion ==
As the first release after former member Koki Tanaka's departure, the album was marketed as the group's first work as four members. This included KAT-TUN performing the title track "Kusabi" on television music programs Live Monster, Shonen Club Premium, Best Artist 2013, and Music Station which they were guests on.

Special campaigns were held to promote the album. Each copy of the album contains a unique user code. From its release date until 1 December, people could use the code to sign up to receive a KAT-TUN New Year Greetings card in 2014, and together with it were given an option to ballot for invitations to an event, KAT-TUN 2014 The First Meeting. In addition, a B2-size poster is given free when purchasing the bundled set of all three versions.

In conjunction with the release of Kusabi, the group is also set to perform their first concert in almost two years, at Kyocera Dome on 30 and 31 December.

== Track listing ==
Regular Edition
No.	Title	Lyrics	Music	Length
1.	"Kusabi" (楔-kusabi- "Wedge")	Rucca	Koudai Iwatsubo, Kinboom	4:07
2.	"Gimme Luv"	Kahlua	Rock Stone, Steven Lee, Jimmy Richard	4:08
3.	"On & On"	Noyce'	King of Slick, Laika Leon	3:42
4.	"Fire and Ice"	Forest Young	Steven Lee, Sebastian Thott, Didrik Thott	4:00
5.	"Bless"	Rucca	Yannis Constantinou, Kevin Charge, Claire Rodrigues	3:58
6.	"4U"	25→graffiti	Steven Lee, Jimmy Richard	3:58
7.	"Phoenix"	Maiko Kawabe Rivera	Maiko Kawabe Rivera	4:43

Limited Edition 1
No.	Title	Lyrics	Music	Length
1.	"Kusabi" (楔-kusabi- "Wedge")	Rucca	Koudai Iwatsubo, Kinboom	4:07
2.	"Gimme Luv"	Kahlua	Rock Stone, Steven Lee, Jimmy Richard	4:08
3.	"On & On"	Noyce'	King of Slick, Laika Leon	3:42
4.	"Fire and Ice"	Forest Young	Steven Lee, Sebastian Thott, Didrik Thott	4:00
5.	"Boku Nari no Koi" (僕なりの恋 "My Own Kind of Love")	Iwatsubo	Iwatsubo	5:22
6.	"Monster Night" (Vocal by Tatsuya Ueda)	Ueda, Masami Okaza	RAT-0124	4:09
7.	"Kusabi" (Video clip + Making clip)
8.	"Monster Night" (Music Video)

Limited Edition 2
No.	Title	Lyrics	Music	Length
1.	"Kusabi" (楔-kusabi- "Wedge")	Rucca	Koudai Iwatsubo, Kinboom	4:07
2.	"Gimme Luv"	Kahlua	Rock Stone, Steven Lee, Jimmy Richard	4:08
3.	"On & On"	Noyce'	King of Slick, Laika Leon	3:42
4.	"Fire and Ice"	Forest Young	Steven Lee, Sebastian Thott, Didrik Thott	4:00
5.	"Fantastic Planet"	Ori	Simon Janlov, Shirose	3:36
6.	"Gimme Luv" (Music Video)

== Charts ==
Chart	Peak	Sales
Japan Oricon Weekly Chart	1	168,209
Japan Oricon Monthly Chart	1	168,209
Japan Oricon Yearly Chart	30	179,126
Billboard Japan Top Albums	1	__
