= Yuichi Nakamaru =

Japanese singer-songwriter, actor, and television personality

Yūichi Nakamaru 中丸雄一
- Also known as: Nakamaru, Yucchi, YUCCI
- Born: September 4, 1983 (age 42); Kita, Tokyo, Japan
- Genres: J-pop
- Occupations: Singer; actor; host
- Alma mater: Waseda University
- Instrument: Vocals
- Years active: 1998–present
- Label: J-One Records
- Spouse: Rina Sasazaki (m. 2024)
- Website: Yuichi Nakamaru Starto Entertainment profile

Yūichi Nakamaru (中丸雄一, Nakamaru Yuuichi; born on September 4, 1983 in Kita-ku, Tokyo, Japan), is a Japanese singer-songwriter, actor, television personality and radio host under Starto Entertainment. He joined the talent agency Johnny & Associates in 1998 and then officially debuted as part of KAT-TUN in 2006, group to which he belonged until its disbandment in April 2025.

Individually, he has acted in numerous drama serials and is most known as a commentator and host of his own segment on NTV information variety show Sunday Countdown Show Shūichi.

== Early life and education ==
Nakamaru was born in Kita-ku, but raised in Sumida-ku, Tokyo. He is the oldest child in a family of five composed of his parents and two younger sisters with 6 and 4 years age difference respectively. He has a fear of heights and phobia of needles.

His reason for applying to Johnny & Associates was that in the last year of junior high school, a female classmate who liked Johnny's idols told him to try out and prepared his application form to the point that he only needed to sign it.

His special skill is in beatboxing and this talent has been recognized by various other celebrities such as Rag Fair's Okkun and Masi Oka.

In April 2008, he entered Waseda University and majored in Human Environmental Sciences through the university's undergraduate correspondence course e-school. He successfully graduated in March 2013.

== Career ==
Nakamaru officially joined Johnny & Associates in November 1998 with bandmate Kazuya Kamenashi and agency mates Jin Akanishi, Takahisa Masuda, Taisuke Fujigaya and Ryōichi Tsukada, who were all in the same audition. He was a member of four temporary units while still a Johnny's Jr. – Boys Be Ambitious (B.B.A), Musical Academy Dancing (M.A.D), Best Beat Dancing (B.B.D), and Toshi Otoko.

He joined KAT-TUN when it formed in 2001, and debuted as part of the group in 2006. Besides singing and beatboxing in KAT-TUN, he also wrote lyrics for his solo songs or duet songs with the other members. For rap lyrics, he uses the alias Yucci.

In 2009, he appeared in his first ever leading role in a drama in TBS TV's "Rescue ~Tokubetsu Kōdo Kyūjotai".

On April 27, 2021, Nakamaru was revealed as the second member in a new Johnny's YouTube channel, ジャにのちゃんねる (Janinochaneru), led by Arashi's Kazunari Ninomiya.

On March 23, 2023, Nakamaru celebrated Japan's win at the 2023 World Baseball Classic as well as KAT-TUN's 17th debut anniversary in post in his just-opened Twitter and Instagram, though he posted he had been using Twitter since 2010. His SNS is the latest after fellow KAT-TUN members Kamenashi and Ueda. He also posted that he would be using his SNS to share updates on his original manga, as well as daily rantings.

Nakamaru reported that he went under agent and management mixed contract since January 2024 for his activities with the agency on his newly opened YouTube channel "Nakamaru Ginga Channel".

Nakamaru reappeared in a live event, when he took the stage as MC at the opening ceremony of the "Osaka Comic Convention 2025" held in Intex Osaka on May 2, 2025, following his self-impossed hiatus after news of his secret rendezvous with a 20-year old woman in a Tokyo hotel in August 2024, and the dissolution of KAT-TUN in March. He also participated as an exhibitor, with his manga "Yamada-kun no zawameku jikan".

== Other activities ==
=== Mangaka ===
Yuichi Nakamaru became an official manga artist with his first manga, titled Yamada-kun no Zawameku Jikan (山田君のざわめく時間; lit. 'Yamada's Noisy Time'). It was serialized in Kodansha's Monthly Afternoon magazine from June 23 to November 25, 2023. Its chapters were compiled in a single tankōbon volume, which was released as a physical book and in digital form on January 23, 2024.

=== YouTuber ===
In 2021, a new Johnny's YouTube channel called ジャにのちゃんねる (Jyaninochaneru), led by Arashi's Kazunari Ninomiya, was opened. The channel is also run by Nakamaru, Hey! Say! JUMP's Ryosuke Yamada, and Sexy Zone's Fuma Kikuchi.

He opened a channel for himself, called "Nakamaru Ginga Channeru" (中丸銀河ちゃんねる), with the first video posted on 13 January 2024. The channel's content covers all kinds of activities, from solo talk, to interviews with friends, to gameplays, to travel reports, and work related activities, such as posts about his manga. The official opening is set for the 20th.

== Personal life ==
Nakamaru announced his marriage to former NTV announcer Rina Sasazaki on 16 January 2024 through the agency's official site. Nakamaru and Sasazaki met in 2015, when she started working at NTV and became a co-worker at Shuichi. Sasazaki eliminated all posts from her SNS on the 16.

On August 7, 2024, Shūkan Bunshun reported that Nakamaru had secretly met with a 20-year-old college student at a hotel. Nakamaru responded with an apology "to all concerned", through his agency, which also posted a comment regarding his "lack of awareness and responsibility". As a consequence, of his own volition, he would refrain from all activities for an undisclosed period of time, that included his regular appearances in NTV's Shuichi, TV Asahi's Kaji yarō, and Asahi Osaka's Asa da! Namadesu tabi sarada, as well as YouTube channel "Yoninochannel", which posted on its community page the suspension of video updates until further notice. On January 3, 2025, Starto Entertainment informed that Nakamaru would be resuming activities from that day on.

== Filmography ==
=== Television ===
==== Dramas ====
- P.P.O.I. (1999) as Suga Shika
- Sushi Ōji! (2007) as Tarō Kawahara
- Rescue ~Tokubetsu Kōdo Kyūjotai (2009) as Daiichi Kitajima
- Last Money: Ai no Nedan (2011) as Keigo Ōno
- Hayami-san to Yobareru Hi (2012) as Kaoru Hayami
- Omoni Naitemasu (2012) as Keisuke Akamatsu
- The Wrong Man (2013) as Yasushi Kawamura
- Henshin Interviewer no Yūutsu (2013) as Jirō Shirakawa/Kirio Aonuma
- First Class (2014) as Itsuki Nishihara
- 99.9: Criminal Lawyer – Episode 10 (2016) as Yoichi Ishikawa
- Massage Tantei Joe (2017) as Yabukihara Jo

==== TV movies ====
- Kowai Nichiyōbi (1999)
- Kowai Nichiyōbi ~New Chapter~ (1999)
- Tōsan Special Drama in FNS 27Jikan TV (2000)
- Kowai Nichiyōbi ~2000~ (2000) as Tōru
- Kindaichi Case Files (2005) as Nakane
- Haha no Okurimono (2009) as Masaaki Wakamori
- Hanchou 3 (2010) as Shinobu Sonoda
- Dachitabi ~First Chapter Dal Segno na Camp~ (2011) as Yūichi Takamaru
- Hayami-san to Yobareru Hi SP Part I (2012) as Kaoru Hayami
- Hayami-san to Yobareru Hi SP Part II (2012) as Kaoru Hayami
- Lucky Seven SP (2013) as Masaru Wakunaga
- The Partner ~Itoshiki Hyakunen no Tomo e~ (2013) as Noriaki Hatakeyama

==== TV programs ====
- YOUtachi! (2006–2007) Co-host
- Dosp 2 Geinōkai Sushi Zatsugaku Ōji Ketteisen! (2008)
- Sushi Ōji! KAT-TUN Nakamaru ga Iku! Hong Kong Gourmet Tour!! Sekaiichi Sushi Ōji e no Michi (2008)
- Shounen Club (2006–2011) Co-host
- Tensai o Tsukuru! Galileo Nōken (2009–2011)
- Sunday Countdown Show Shūichi (2011–present) Commentator
- Sekai Rūtsu Tankentai (2017–) MC
- NTV's 24-Hr TV (2022) (co-host, as member of YouTube channel Jyaninochaneru)

=== Movies ===
- Sushi Ōji! Goes to New York (2008) as Tarō Kawahara

=== Stage plays ===
- Nakamaru-kun no Tanoshii Jikan (2008) as himself
- Dream Boys (2011) as Yūichi

=== Anime ===
- Crayon Shin-chan Sushi Ōji Dazo! (2008) as himself

=== Radio ===
- R-One KAT-TUN Co-host
- KAT-TUN no Gatsūn Co-host

=== Commercials ===
- Asahi Group Holdings, Ltd.
  - Wonda Coffee (2022) With Arashi's Kazunari Ninomiya
  - Clear Asahi beer (April 2023) As part of Jyaninochannel
- LAWSON (2015)
- Lotte
  - Sou
  - Crunky (2002)
  - Plus X (2003)
- Misawa Homes
- NTT DoCoMo
  - New 9 Series (2006)
  - FOMA903i (2006)
- Rohto
  - Mogitate Kajitsu (2005, 2007, 2008)
  - Rohto C Cube (2005)
  - Sesera (2006)
- SKY Perfect JSAT Corporation
  - SKY PerfecTV! (2006)
  - SKY PerfecTV Premium Service (2006)

== Discography ==
=== Solo songs ===
| Year | Title | Details |
|---|---|---|
| 2005 | Understandable | Performed in Spring 05 Looking KAT-TUN, Looking 05 KAT-TUN concert, featured in DVD KAT-TUN~No More Pain~World Tour 2010 |
| 2005 | Shooting Star | Performed in Looking KAT-TUN 2005ing concert, featured in DVD KAT-TUN~No More Pain~World Tour 2010 |
| 2007 | My Weather | Featured in DVD Live of KAT-TUN "Real Face" |
| 2007 | Key of Life | Featured in album Cartoon KAT-TUN II You and DVDs Tour 2007 Cartoon KAT-TUN II You, KAT-TUN~No More Pain~World Tour 2010 |
| 2008 | Smack | Featured in single Don't U Ever Stop and DVD KAT-TUN Live Tour 2008 Queen Of Pirates |
| 2009 | White World | Featured in album Break the Records: By You & For You and DVD KAT-TUN Live Break the Records |
| 2010 | Answer | Featured in single Going! |
| 2010 | Film | Featured in album No More Pain and DVD KAT-TUN~No More Pain~World Tour 2010 |
| 2012 | Step by Step | Featured in album Chain and DVD KAT-TUN Live Tour 2012 Chain Tokyo Dome |
| 2013 | Snowflake | Featured in single Expose |
| 2014 | Crescent (クレセント) | Featured in album Come Here |
| 2018 | The way | Featured in album Ask Yourself |

=== Collaboration Songs ===
| Year | Title | Details |
|---|---|---|
| 2006 | One on One | With Tanaka Koki and was featured in album Best of KAT-TUN |
| 2010 | GIRLS | With Taguchi Junnosuke and Tanaka Koki under the name NTT and was featured in single Change Ur World |
| 2015 | Kirarito (キラリト) | With Taguchi Junnosuke and was featured in single Kiss Kiss Kiss |

== Manga ==
=== Volumes ===
| No. | Title | Japanese release date | Japanese ISBN |
|---|---|---|---|
| 01 | Yamada's noisy time Yamada-kun no Zawameku Jikan (山田君のざわめく時間) | January 23, 2024 | 4065314518 |

== Awards ==
2009
- 6th TVNavi Magazine Awards: Best Newcomer for "Rescue ~Tokubetsu Kōdo Kyūjotai"
