= Best of KAT-TUN =

Studio album by KAT-TUN
- Released: March 22, 2006 (Japan)
- Recorded: 2006
- Genres: Pop, rock
- Length: 1:08:15 (Regular Edition)
- Labels: J-One Records; JACA-5038 (Regular Edition)

KAT-TUN chronology
Best of KAT-TUN (2006)	Cartoon KAT-TUN II You (2007)

Singles from Best of KAT-TUN
- 1. "Real Face" Released: March 22, 2006

"Best of KAT-TUN" is the debut album by Japanese boy band KAT-TUN, released in Japan on March 22, 2006 by J-One Records. Despite the title, it is not a greatest hits compilation album. Seven songs on the record, however, were part of KAT-TUN's live tour set list prior to their debut and were already familiar with longtime fans.

The album was part of a tripartite release also consisting of the group's debut single and its tie-in DVD. All three releases were immensely successful on the Oricon albums, singles and DVD charts with "Real Face" and "Real Face Film" being certified as the best-selling single and domestic music DVD of the year respectively. The album itself was the eleventh best-selling album of the year.

== Album information ==
Most of the songs on the album were written for KAT-TUN either by in-house Johnny's Entertainment songwriters or lyricists with a track record of successful hit records for other artists. KAT-TUN members, with the exception of Junnosuke Taguchi, co-wrote 3 songs for the album which were sung as duets. All rap lyrics were also written by Koki Tanaka himself.

== Chart performance and reception ==
In its first week of release, Best of KAT-TUN sold 556,548 copies in Japan, the highest first-week sales for the group to date. The album actually debuted at number 1 on the Oricon daily album charts the day before its release since its official release date fell on a national holiday. Therefore, it didn't officially chart for the week. KAT-TUN were awarded six awards at the 21st Japan Gold Disc Awards (the Japanese equivalent of the Grammy Awards) with Best of KAT-TUN named on "The Best 10 Albums (Domestic)" list. Soon after the home success, Best of KAT-TUN was then released in Taiwan and Thailand in 2006 by EMI Taiwan and EMI Thailand, respectively.

It stayed on the Oricon Top 30 Albums chart for 7 weeks with a total of 743,359 copies sold at the end of its chart-run. Oricon certified the album as the 11th best-selling record of the year and was later certified Triple Platinum by RIAJ denoting over 750,000 shipments.

== Track listing ==
1. "She Said..." (Ryo Taguchi, Axel G, Katsumi Ohnishi, FLYING GRIND, JOKER) – 3:43
2. "Never Again" (SPIN, Steven Lee, Joey Carbone FLYING GRIND, JOKER) – 3:49
3. "I Like It" (Sean Thomas, SPIN, FLYING GRIND) – 4:26
4. "Miracle" (hamai, Minoru Kumorita, Seikou Nagaoka) - 4:22
5. "Blue Tuesday" (Yoji Kubota, Arata Tanimoto, Tomoki Ishizuka) – 4:33
6. "Rhodesia" (CHOKKAKU) - 5:06
7. "Gold" (Stefan Aberg, Stefan Engblom, SPIN, FLYING GRIND, JOKER) - 4:53
8. "Wilds of My Heart" (SPIN, zero-rock, Gyo Kitagawa, JOKER) – 3:59
9. "Special Happiness"^{1} (K², Gajin, Yoshihiko Chino) – 5:02
10. "One on One"^{2} (JOKER, Yuichi Nakamaru, mo'doo-, Izutsu "Growth" Shintaro, Takahito Eguchi) – 4:58
11. "Butterfly"^{3} (Jin Akanishi, Tatsuya Ueda, velvetronica) – 4:52
12. "Rush of Light" (ma-saya, Watermelon 6, CHOKKAKU) - 4:26
13. "Harukana Yakusoku (ハルカナ約束)" (SPIN, Kousuke Morimoto, ha-j, JOKER) - 3:53
14. "Precious One" (Kaori Niimi, Yuuki Shirai, Yoshinao Mikami, ha-j) - 5:15
15. "Real Face #1" (Shikao Suga, Tak Matsumoto, Akihito Tokunaga, JOKER) - 4:58

^{1} Kazuya Kamenashi and Junnosuke Taguchi duet.
^{2} Koki Tanaka and Yuichi Nakamaru duet.
^{3} Jin Akanishi and Tatsuya Ueda duet.

=== Sales and certifications ===
Country	Provider	Sales	Certification
Japan	RIAJ	743,359	Triple Platinum

== Chart positions ==
Country	Peak Position
Oricon Weekly Albums Chart (Japan)	1
