= To the Limit (song) =

Single by KAT-TUN
- B-side: Walking In The Light; Spirit; Sorezore No Sora
- Released: June 27, 2012
- Recorded: 2012
- Genre: Pop rock
- Label: J-One
- Songwriter(s): M.U.R., masanco, Tom Diekmeier, Junior H Johansson, Tom Diekmeier, Billy Marx Jr.
- Producer(s): Johnny H. Kitagawa

KAT-TUN singles chronology
"Birth" (2011)	"To the Limit" (2012)	"Fumetsu no Scrum" (2012)

"To the Limit" is the eighteenth single by Japanese boy band KAT-TUN. The single's title track is the CM song for ‘Suzuki Solio Bandit‘. The song will contain the message, “Don’t be complacent and satisfied with your present state, grab your future and dreams while bravely facing difficulties.” The rock beat number with their passionate message will rouse your heart.

== Single information ==
The single will be available in 2 versions, a limited edition and a regular edition. A DVD with the music video of “TO THE LIMIT” will be included in the limited edition, and just the CD for the regular edition with the bonus track “SPIRIT“. The track, “SPIRIT“, is the theme song for NTV's live coverage of baseball games for the program, “Dramatic Game 1844” and also the theme song for NTV's news and sports program “Going！Sports & News“. The song is about the importance of bonding with friends, and going forward towards a dream. On the radio show of KAT-TUN's Kamenashi Kazuya, ‘Kamenashi Kazuya no HANG OUT‘, KAT-TUN's single “TO THE LIMIT‘ was revealed. NTV's morning news program ZIP! revealed the preview with KAT-TUN's comments. This will be their first time to create a PV with a storyline.

== Chart performance ==
In its first week of its release, the single topped the Oricon singles chart, reportedly selling 156,351 copies. Since releasing their debut single, “Real Face” (March 2006), KAT-TUN has topped the single ranking 18 consecutive number one singles on the Oricon Weekly Singles Chart since their debut with all their singles sold more than 200,000 copies and continued to hold the most consecutive number one singles since debut with fellow Johnny's group, NEWS. This also marks their 7th consecutive year to place 1st in the charts. KAT-TUN placed at No.14 in the second weeks, reportedly selling 8,166 copies and in the third weeks of its release the single placed at No.37, reportedly selling 2,421 copies.

By the end of the year, To the Limit was reported by Oricon to sell 170,296 copies and was later certified Gold by RIAJ denoting over 100,000 shipments.

== Track listing ==
Regular Edition
No.	Title	Lyrics	Music	Length
1.	"To The Limit"	M.U.R., masanco	Tom Diekmeier, Junior H Johansson, Tom Diekmeier, Billy Marx Jr.
2.	"Sorezore No Sora (それぞれの空)"	miwa*, t-oga, Crews	King of slick, KOUDAI IWATSUBO, Billy Marx Jr.
3.	"Spirit"	miwa*	Albi Albertsson, Stephan Elfgren, DAICHI, Albi Albertsson
4.	"To The Limit" (Original Karaoke オリジナル・カラオケ)
5.	"Sorezore No Sora (それぞれの空)" (Original Karaoke オリジナル・カラオケ)
6.	"Spirit" (Original Karaoke オリジナル・カラオケ)

CD + DVD, Limited Edition
No.	Title	Lyrics	Music	Length
1.	"To the Limit"	Sean-D	Janne Hyoty, DAICHI, Paul Oxley, Billy Marx Jr
2.	"Walking In The Light"	mikalune	Daddylong, Naoshi Shimada
3.	"To the Limit" (Video clip + Making clip ビデオ・クリップ＋メイキング)
4.	"Walking In The Light" (Original Karaoke オリジナル・カラオケ)

== Chart ==
Chart	Peak	Sales
Japan Oricon Weekly Chart	1	156,351
Japan Oricon Monthly Chart	5	156,351
Japan Oricon Yearly Chart	44	170,296
