= Change Ur World =

Single by KAT-TUN

from the album Chain
- B-side: Remember; NEET Man; Give Me, Give Me, Give Me; Never×Over~「-」Is Your Part~; Girls
- Released: November 17, 2010
- Recorded: 2010
- Genre: Pop rock
- Label: J-One Records
- Songwriters: Lyrics: Laika Leon, ECO, Joker; Music: Andreas Johansson, Anderz Wrethov, JUNYT
- Producer: Johnny H. Kitagawa

KAT-TUN singles chronology
"Going!" (2010)	"Change Ur World" (2010)	"Ultimate Wheels" (2011)

"Change Ur World" is the thirteenth single by Japanese boy band KAT-TUN. It was released on November 17, 2010 by their record label J-One Records. The title track was used as the 2nd theme song for the Nippon Television TV Show, Going! Sports & News, which is co-hosted by member Kazuya Kamenashi.

== Chart performance ==
In its first week of its release, the single topped the Oricon singles chart, reportedly selling 230,829 copies. KAT-TUN gained their thirteenth consecutive number one single on the Oricon Weekly Singles Chart since their debut with all their singles sold more than 200,000 copies and continued to hold the second most consecutive number one singles since debut with fellow Johnny's group, NEWS.

By the end of the year, "Change Ur World" was reported by Oricon to sell 264,303 copies and was later certified Platinum by RIAJ denoting over 250,000 shipments.

== Track listing ==
Regular
No.	Title	Lyrics	Music	Length
1.	"Change Ur World"	Laika Leon, ECO, Joker	Andreas Johansson, Anderz Wrethov, JUNYT
2.	"Give Me, Give Me, Give Me"	Sean-D, Joker	Jeff Miyahara
3.	"Never×Over~「-」Is Your Part~"	Koki Tanaka, Minori	Hans Johnson, t-oga, NAO, ATSUSHI, Tatsuya Ueda, King of Slick, Magnus Funemyr
4.	"Change Ur World" (Original Karaoke オリジナル・カラオケ)
5.	"Give Me, Give Me, Give Me" (Original Karaoke オリジナル・カラオケ)
6.	"Never×Over~「-」Is Your Part~" (Original Karaoke オリジナル・カラオケ)

Limited Edition 1
No.	Title	Lyrics	Music	Length
1.	"Change Ur World"	Laika Leon, ECO, Joker	Andreas Johansson, Anderz Wrethov, Andreas Johansson, JUNYT

Limited Edition 1 DVD
No.	Title	Length
1.	"Change Ur World" (Video clip + Making clip ビデオ・クリップ＋メイキング)

Limited Edition 2
No.	Title	Lyrics	Music	Length
2.	"Remember"	Sean-D, Joker	Shusui, Fredrik Hult, Carl Utbult, JUNYT
3.	"NEET Man ニートまん"	Tatsuya Ueda	黒須克彦, Mousepeace
4.	"GIRLS（NTT presented by Junnosuke Taguchi）"	NTT	Eiji Kawai, NTT

== Sales and certifications ==
Country	Provider	Sales	Certification
Japan	RIAJ	264,303	Platinum

== Plagiarism allegations ==
On November 30, 2010, independent artist AVTechNO! posted an entry on his blog expressing shock at the similarities between the first minute of KAT-TUN's track "Never×Over~「-」Is Your Part~" and his own work, "DYE", first released on February 1, 2010. Videos comparing the two works have been posted on video sharing sites such as YouTube and Nico Nico Douga, and have since gathered over a million views combined.

Never×Over~「-」Is Your Part~ is credited to a panel of composers who created member solo songs that had been released in the past. The song consists of old member solo songs put together in a new arrangement.

Lyrics: Koki Tanaka, Minori

Music: Hans Johnson, t-oga, NAO, ATSUSHI, Tatsuya Ueda, King of Slick, Magnus Funemyr

Arrangement: Hans Johnson

The breakdown of applicable sections

- T-oga (Kazuya Kamenashi solo "SWEET" composer)
- NAO (Taguchi Junnosuke solo "LOVE MUSIC" composer)
- ATSUSHI (Koki Tanaka solo "PIERROT" composer)
- Tatsuya Ueda (Tatsuya Ueda solo "RABBIT OR WOLF?" composer)
- King of Slick (Yuichi Nakamaru solo "FILM" composer)
- Magnus Funemyr (Yuichi Nakamaru solo "FILM" composer)
