= In Fact (song) =

Single by KAT-TUN
- B-side: Believe In Myself; Birds; My Secret; Black; Dangerous
- Released: 4 June 2014
- Recorded: 2014
- Genre: Pop rock
- Label: J-One
- Songwriters: Miyakei, Kahlua, pinkcastar, TKMZ
- Producer: Johnny H. Kitagawa

KAT-TUN singles chronology
| "Face To Face" (2013) | "In Fact" (2014) | "Dead Or Alive" (2015) |

"In Fact" is the 22nd single by Japanese boy band KAT-TUN, released in Japan on June 4, 2014, under the label J-One Records. "In Fact" is the main theme song for TV drama series First Class starring Yuichi Nakamaru, which premieres April 19. The first-run limited edition and regular edition also contain "Believe In Myself," the theme song for "Going! Sports & News" featuring Kamenashi Kazuya, and the image song for Nippon Television networks Professional Baseball broadcast "Dramatic Game 1844."

In Fact debuted at the number one spot top the Oricon weekly single chart, selling over 145,872 copies in its first week of release. KAT-TUN achieved their 22nd consecutive No.1 with their 22nd single, "In Fact". They are currently behind Kinki Kids who are with 33 consecutive No.1 singles since debut. In Fact sold 6,997 copies in its second week. The single has sold 160,192 copies so far.

== Single information ==
In Fact is the twenty-second single release from KAT-TUN, released approximately one year after their previous single Face to Face. The release comes in three versions - Regular Edition, Limited Edition, and First Press Edition . All versions of the album include "In Fact", and "Believe In Myself". The Regular Edition contains six track, with "Birds" and original karaoke included. The Regular Edition (First Press) contains seven tracks, with My Secret", "Black" and "Dangerous" and original karaoke included. The Limited Edition includes "In Fact" and "Believe In Myself" on CD, comes with a bonus DVD with a music video for the title song and its making-of.

== Promotion ==
In Fact Bundled Set of All 3 Editions comes with a bonus of KAT-TUN "B2-sized poster".

== Track listing ==
Regular Edition
| No. | Title | Lyrics | Music | Length |
|---|---|---|---|---|
| 1. | "In Fact" | Miyakei, Kahlua | pinkcastar, TKMZ, |
| 2. | "Believe In Myself" | Laika Leon | Eiji Kawai |
| 3. | "Birds" | KOUDAI IWATSUBO | KOUDAI IWATSUBO, Kinboom |
| 4. | "In Fact" (Original Karaoke オリジナル・カラオケ) |
| 5. | "Believe In Myself" (Original Karaoke オリジナル・カラオケ) |
| 6. | "Birds" (Original Karaoke オリジナル・カラオケ) |

CD + DVD, Limited Edition
| No. | Title | Lyrics | Music | Length |
|---|---|---|---|---|
| 1. | "In Fact" | Miyakei, Kahlua | pinkcastar, TKMZ, DREADSTORE COWBOY |
| 2. | "Believe In Myself" | Laika Leon | Eiji Kawai |
| 4. | "In Fact" (Video clip + Making clip ビデオ・クリップ＋メイキング) |

Regular Edition (First Press)
| No. | Title | Lyrics | Music | Length |
|---|---|---|---|---|
| 1. | "In Fact" | Miyakei, Kahlua | pinkcastar, TKMZ, DREADSTORE COWBOY |
| 2. | "My Secret" | FOREST YOUNG | STEVEN LEE, Sebastian Thott, Didrik Thott, Billy Marx Jr. |
| 3. | "Black" | 25→graffiti | DAICHI, KAY |
| 4. | "Dangerous" | Rucca | Carl Bjorsell, Didrik Thott, Takarot |
| 5. | "My Secret" (Original Karaoke オリジナル・カラオケ) |
| 6. | "Black" (Original Karaoke オリジナル・カラオケ) |
| 7. | "Dangerous" (Original Karaoke オリジナル・カラオケ) |

== Charts ==
| Chart | Peak | Sales |
|---|---|---|
| Japan Oricon Weekly Chart | 1 | 145,872 |
| Japan Oricon Monthly Chart | 3 | 157,440 |
| Japan Oricon Yearly Chart | 43 | 160,192 |
