= Going! =

Single by KAT-TUN

from the album No More Pain
- B-side: Fall Down; Smile; I Don't Miss U; Answer
- Released: May 12, 2010
- Recorded: 2010
- Genre: Pop rock
- Label: J-One Records
- Songwriters: Eco, Joker, Shusui, Sakoshin, Taku Yoshioka
- Producer: Johnny H. Kitagawa

KAT-TUN singles chronology
"Love Yourself (Kimi ga Kirai na Kimi ga Suki)" (2010)	"Going!" (2010)	"Change Ur World" (2010)

"Going!" is the twelfth single by Japanese boy band KAT-TUN. It was released on May 12, 2010 by their record label J-One Records. The title track was used as the theme song for the Nippon Television TV Show, Going! Sports & News, which is co-hosted by member Kazuya Kamenashi.

== Single information ==
Twelfth single release from KAT-TUN including the song "Going!," theme song of a Japanese TV program, "Going! Sports & News." Regular edition includes a bonus track "Fall Down" and two karaoke tracks. Limited edition A includes a bonus track "Smile" and a bonus DVD with a music video and making-of footage of the single. Limited edition B includes two bonus tracks "I don't miss U" (Koki Tanaka solo) and "Answer" (Yuichi Nakamaru solo). Features alternate jacket artwork.

== Chart performance ==
In its first week of its release, the single topped the Oricon singles chart, reportedly selling 230,452 copies. KAT-TUN gained their twelfth consecutive number one single on the Oricon Weekly Singles Chart since their debut and continued to hold the second most consecutive number one singles since debut with fellow Johnny's group, NEWS.

By the end of the year, Going! was reported by Oricon to sell 283,168 copies and was later certified Platinum by RIAJ denoting over 250,000 shipments.

== Track listing ==
Regular
No.	Title	Lyrics	Music	Length
1.	"Going!"	Eco, Joker	Shusui, Sakoshin, Taku Yoshioka
2.	"Fall Down"	Sean-D, Joker	Steven Lee, Black Zack
3.	"Going!" (Original Karaoke オリジナル・カラオケ)
4.	"Fall Down" (Original Karaoke オリジナル・カラオケ)

Limited Edition 1
No.	Title	Lyrics	Music	Length
3.	"Smile"	Takehiko Iida, SPIN	Takehiko Iida, ha-j

Limited Edition 1 DVD
No.	Title	Length
1.	"Going!" (Video clip + Making clip ビデオ・クリップ＋メイキング)

Limited Edition 2
No.	Title	Lyrics	Music	Length
2.	"I Don't Miss U"	Joker, Axel-G	Alfred Tuohey, Thanh Bui, Wayne Milton
3.	"Answer"	Yuichi Nakamaru, t-oga	三上吉直

== Sales and certifications ==
Country	Provider	Sales	Certification
Japan	RIAJ	283,168	Platinum
