= Dead or Alive (KAT-TUN song) =

"Dead Or Alive"

Single by KAT-TUN
- B-side: White Lovers; You are Delicious!; Polaris; Hanasanaide Ai
- Released: 21 January 2015
- Recorded: 2015
- Genre: Pop rock
- Label: J-One
- Songwriter(s): Jovette Rivera, Maiko Kawabe Rivera
- Producer(s): Johnny H. Kitagawa

KAT-TUN singles chronology
"In Fact" (2014)	"Dead Or Alive" (2015)	"Kiss Kiss Kiss" (2015)

"Dead Or Alive" is the 23rd single by Japanese boy band KAT-TUN, released in Japan on January 21, 2015, on the J-One Records label. It is their first single in eight months, since the release of "In Fact". The title track "Dead Or Alive" the main theme song for the film Joker Game starring member Kamenashi Kazuya, released on January 31, 2015. In addition, the single will include a Kamenashi Kazuya solo song and music video, the last member to release his solo promotional video in conjunction with the group's single releases. Titled "Hanasanaide Ai", his upcoming track is written and composed by Kinki Kids' Domoto Tsuyoshi.

== Single information ==
"Dead or Alive" is the twenty-third single release from KAT-TUN, released approximately eight months after their previous single In Fact. The release comes in three versions - Regular Edition, Limited Edition 1, and Limited Edition 2. All versions of the album include "Dead or Alive". The Regular Edition contains six track, with "White Lovers", "You are Delicious!" and original karaoke included. The Limited Edition 1 contains four tracks, with "Polaris", original karaoke included and comes with a bonus DVD with the title song and its making-of. The Limited Edition 2 includes "Hanasanaide Ai" on CD, comes with a bonus DVD with a music video for the solo song of Kamenashi Kazuya.

Lyrics, music and arrangement of "Dead or Alive" is by Jovette Rivera and Maiko Kawabe Rivera, the couple who are also responsible for KAT-TUN's past album highlights (Phoenix, Moon, 1582, Taboo, Water Dance). The song is described as a hard tune which depicts the paper-thin extremity between life and death as geniuses put their intelligence to the test for this dramatically impactful and large-scale game. This work shows how KAT-TUN continues to dig even deeper as they mature. On the other hand, Kamenashi is emotional, expressing a "love that doesn't let go", in a lot of ways, in his solo video for "Hanasaide Ai", a song written and composed by Kinki Kids' Domoto Tsyuyoshi. The song was written in 2002 and was his very first solo song.

== Promotion ==
On December 27, 2014, KAT-TUN performed "Dead Or Alive" for the first time, on the music variety program Samaazu no Utafuri! aired on NTV in Japan.

== Track listing ==
Regular Edition
No.	Title	Lyrics	Music	Length
1.	"Dead or Alive"	Jovette Rivera, Maiko Kawabe Rivera	Jovette Rivera, Maiko Kawabe Rivera
2.	"White Lovers"	Rucca	Shun Kusakawa, L-m-T, Daichi
3.	"You are Delicious!"	Forest Young	Stephan Elfgren, Hani Alwani, Magnus Bertelsen
4.	"Dead or Alive" (Original Karaoke オリジナル・カラオケ)
5.	"White Lovers" (Original Karaoke オリジナル・カラオケ)
6.	"You are Delicious!" (Original Karaoke オリジナル・カラオケ)

CD + DVD, Limited Edition 1
No.	Title	Lyrics	Music	Length
1.	"Dead or Alive"	Jovette Rivera, Maiko Kawabe Rivera	Jovette Rivera, Maiko Kawabe Rivera
2.	"Polaris"	Koudai Iwatsubo, Kahlua	Magnus Funemyr, Koudai Iwatsubo
3.	"Polaris" (Original Karaoke オリジナル・カラオケ)
4.	"Dead or Alive" (Video clip + Making clip ビデオ・クリップ+メイキング)

CD + DVD, Limited Edition 2
No.	Title	Lyrics	Music	Length
1.	"Dead or Alive"	Jovette Rivera, Maiko Kawabe Rivera	Jovette Rivera, Maiko Kawabe Rivera
2.	"Hanasanaide Ai"	Domoto Tsuyoshi	Domoto Tsuyoshi
3.	"Hanasanaide Ai" (Video clip)

== Chart performance ==
"Dead or Alive" debuted at the number one spot on the Oricon weekly single chart, selling over 191,505 copies in its first week of release. This was the 23rd consecutive number-one single for KAT-TUN, putting them in second place behind Kinki Kids with 34 consecutive number-one singles since debuting. KAT-TUN topped the Oricon Monthly Chart for January 2015 with 199,598 copies sold. The single has sold 205,500 copies so far.

Chart	Peak	Sales
Japan Oricon Weekly Chart	1	191,505
Japan Oricon Monthly Chart	1	199,598
Japan Oricon Yearly Chart	30	205,500
