= Kazuya Kamenashi =

Japanese singer (born 1986)

Kazuya Kamenashi 亀梨 和也
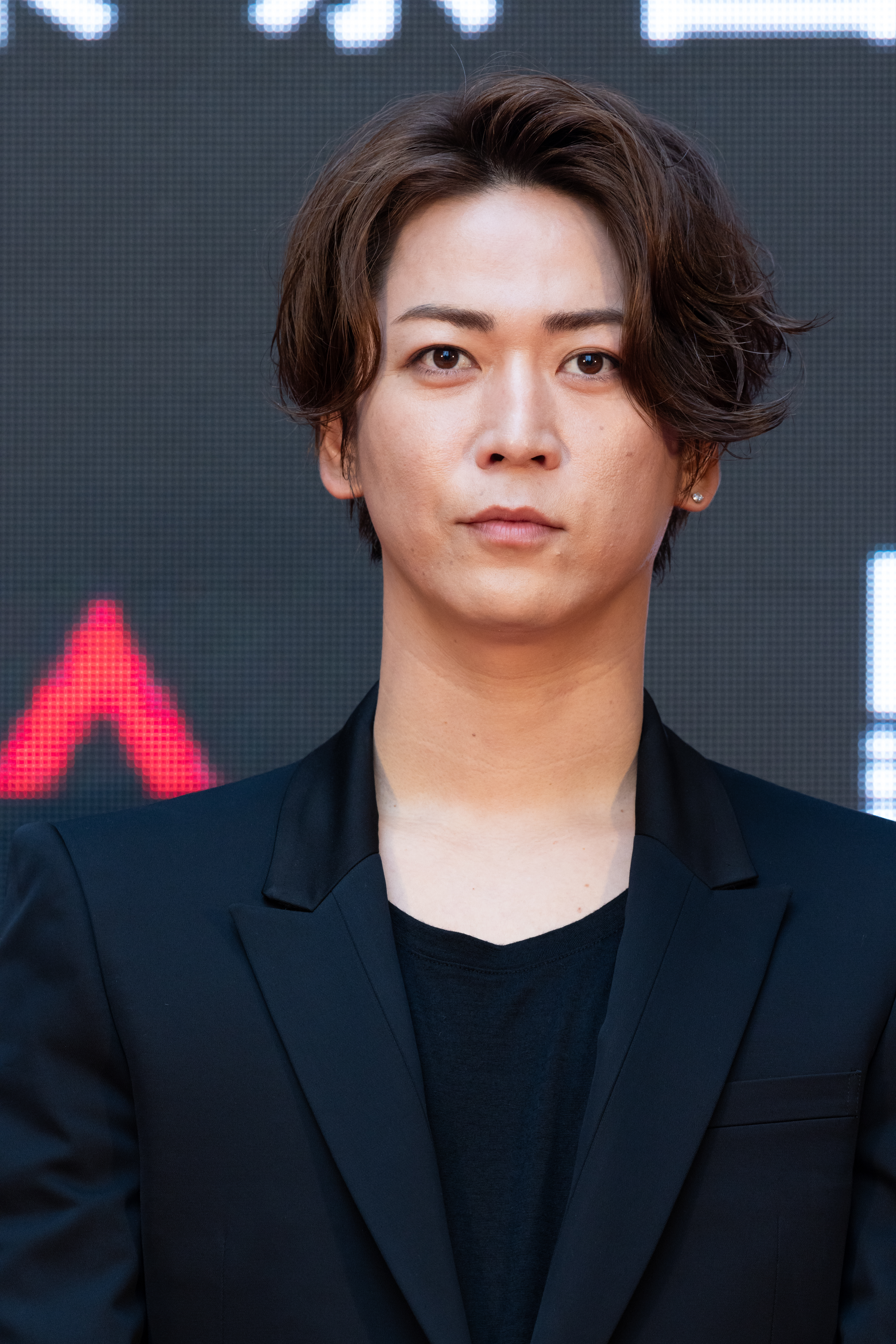
- Kamenashi at the 37th Tokyo International Film Festival in 2024

Background information
- Also known as: Kame, Kame-chan, Kazu
- Born: February 23, 1986 (age 40); Edogawa, Tokyo, Japan
- Genre: J-pop
- Occupations: Singer; actor; TV and radio host; TV producer; magazine model
- Instrument: Vocals
- Years active: 1998–present
- Label: J Storm
- Formerly of: KAT-TUN; Shūji to Akira; Kame to Yamapi
- Spouse: Minami Tanaka (m. 2026)
- Website: kazuya-kamenashi.com

Kazuya Kamenashi (亀梨 和也, Kamenashi Kazuya; born February 23, 1986) is a Japanese singer, actor, host, producer and magazine model. Born and raised in Edogawa, Tokyo. He joined the Japanese talent agency, Johnny & Associates at the age of 12. Former member of KAT-TUN under Starto Entertainment.

He was drafted as a member and co-lead vocalist of the popular J-pop group KAT-TUN in 2001. He is also one half of the temporary group, Shūji to Akira, whose only single "Seishun Amigo" became the best-selling single of 2005 in Japan. Individually, he is a popular actor who has played the lead role in several television dramas.

Kamenashi announced that he would leave Starto in March 2025, when his contract expired.

== Early life ==
Born in Edogawa, Tokyo on February 23, 1986, Kamenashi is the third child of his parents. He has two older brothers, Yūichirō and Kōji, and one younger brother, Yūya. He also has two sisters-in-law and a niece from his second brother's marriage and a nephew from his first brother's marriage. His given name comes from a character from the manga, Touch, written by a Japanese manga artist, Mitsuru Adachi. Coincidentally, bandmate Tatsuya Ueda was also named after the twin brother of Kamenashi's namesake.

An avid baseball fan and player like the character he was named after, Kamenashi once represented his country in the junior world league as shortstop though he had to give up the sport professionally due to lack of spare time after he was accepted into Johnny's Entertainment despite having the support of Johnny Kitagawa, the agency's president, to pursue both careers.

== Career ==
According to an entertainment insider, Kamenashi has considered leaving both KAT-TUN and Starto. A date has not been revealed yet. He has concentrated in building an individual career. The last time he participated with KAT-TUN was in 2022. The news was confirmed on February 12, 2025. KAT-TUN disbanded on March 31, 2025, and Kamenashi left that same day.

Kamenashi and former KAT-TUN co–member Jin Akanishi posted on November 8, 2026 on their respective SNS a message, Kamenashi posted the words "Coming soon" and Akanishi posted "Hello" along with a joint website under the domain "jinkame.com", and in it, their names and a clock countdown marking two days.

=== Acting career ===
In 2009, Kamenashi was cast in a live-action adaptation of a wine-themed manga, Kami no Shizuku, as the leading actor. Voters awarded him, his co-stars (Riisa Naka and Seiichi Tanabe) and the drama a near clean sweep of the winter edition of the Nikkan Sports Drama Grand Prix Awards in March 2009. He made a guest appearance as a doctor on the third episode of TBS drama series, Mr. Brain, opposite his talent agency senior Takuya Kimura. Kamenashi also made his film debut on July 11, 2009, reprising his role of Ryū Odagiri, now a trainee teacher in Gokusen The Movie. The movie earned half a billion yen in its opening weekend landing at the top spot of the box office and stayed in the top ten for six consecutive weeks. It later ranked at number 16 on Japan's 2009 yearly box office results raking in US$33,963,369 at the end of its run.

In 2010, he was cast in the leading role of Kyohei Takano for a live-action adaptation of popular manga, Yamato Nadeshiko Shichi Henge, which aired on NTV. It was named Best Drama by voters of the 13th Nikkan Sports Drama Grand Prix Awards in March 2010 while Kamenashi and his co-star, Aya Omasa, were also awarded Best Actor and Best Supporting Actress respectively.

In 2011, he took on a role as Bem from the adaptation of anime Yōkai Ningen Bem. He received Best Actor award from Nikkan Sports Drama Grand Prix and Television Drama Academy Awards that year. Following the success of the drama, Yōkai Ningen Bem was made into film in 2012. At the end of its run, the film had grossed US$12,628,578 gross.

In 2013, Kamenashi starred in the movie It's Me, It's Me. The movie premiered in 15th Udine Far East Film Festival Italy in April, and Kamenashi won the My Movie Audience Award.

In 2016, Kamenashi was cast in the drama, The Mysterious Thief Yamaneko, which was based on the novel "Kaito Tantei Yamaneko Series" by Manabu Kaminaga as Yamaneko.

In 2017, he appeared in the drama Boku unmei no hito desu alongside his former co-star from Nobuta wo produce, Tomohisa Yamashita. In March 2017 Kamenashi together with Tao Tsuchiya in Live Action Film popular Japanese shojo manga PとJK, Also in May 2017 he co-starring Lily Franky as supporting actor, in an independent film A Beautiful Star (美しい).

In 2018, he was back in filming drama series, taking the lead of Final Cut, (Fuji TV), He also appeared in TV Movie Tegami: Keigo Higashino (東野圭吾 手紙) Based on the popular novel Tegami by Keigo Higashino.

In 2019, he was cast alongside Fumi Nikaido as main in a re-make of a masterpiece Strawberry Night into Strawberry Night Saga (Fuji TV).

=== Music ===
As a Junior, Kamenashi was a back dancer for senior performers such as KinKi Kids, V6, Tackey & Tsubasa and Arashi, appearing both in music shows as well as concerts.

While on KAT-TUN, Kamenashi debuted as a solo artist with his single "Rain" in 2019. Seven years later, as an independent artist, Kamenashi releases his first solo album, "Wave", on July 8, 2026.

== Other endeavors ==
=== Modeling and fashion ===
Kamenashi walked the runway in 2008 for Hermès' men's autumn/winter 2008 collection in Tokyo. In 2010, Kamenashi won the annual Best Jeanist award with more than 29,000 votes in the men's category, almost triple that of the second runner-up, Masaki Aiba. This is his fifth consecutive win and is thus promoted into the hall of fame, making him Eternal Best Jeanist and ineligible for future runs.

=== Baseball ===
Kamenashi threw the first pitch at the Pacific League opening ceremony for the 2009 baseball season at a match in Chiba City featuring the Chiba Lotte Marines against the Fukuoka SoftBank Hawks on July 19, 2009.

Kamenashi participated in the Central League's Yomiuri Giants 23rd FanFiesta 2009 on November 23, 2009, and led his team to victory. He participated during the 1st inning as shortstop and for the 2nd and 3rd innings as pitcher. He belonged to the Black Rose Variety Team led by SMAP's Nakai Masahiro against the Giants Select Members Team.

In 2012, he was given the opportunity to do live coverage of Major League Baseball between Oakland Athletics and Yomiuri Giants. He also threw the ceremonial pitch against Jemile Weeks.

Kamenashi is a commentator and host on the sports shows Going! Sports&News and Dramatic Game.

=== Social networking ===
2023 started with a New Year's greeting from Kamenashi on his newly opened Instagram. In the post, a stuffed turtle, a classic image linked to him because of the kanji in his last name, invites fans to follow him. Kamenashi was the first in KAT-TUN to open an SNS account.

=== "Inside 23" ===
Kamenashi has a project in which he "experiments" different things. Opened on February 23, 2024, "Inside 23" has seen a "Talk-(musical) showcase", a clothing line, and the fans participating asking for goods to include (like jewelry), as he said in his radio program "KAT-TUN Kamenashi Kazuya no Hang Out" on February 8, 2024, when he was still planning the site. In the "Inside 23 experiment No.0/No.B" solo concert held on February 23, 2024, Kamenashi had Tomohisa Yamashita as a guest.

== Personal life ==
Kamenashi announced his marriage to Minami Tanaka in a message to his official fan club on June 29, 2026. In the same message, he revealed that that Tanaka was pregnant. The met at a photo shoot for the November 2023 issue of the Japanese magazine Maquia, which featured Tanaka on the cover, and acted together in the 2024 drama Destiny. Rumors of their relationship surfaced in early 2024.

== Discography ==
=== Singles ===
List of singles, with selected chart positions and sales
Title	Release date	Peaks	Sales
Title	Release date	JPN	Sales
"Sayonara Arigato"	November 6, 2013	1	JPN: 100,206
"Rain"	May 15, 2019	1	JPN: 153,179
"Cross"	August 18, 2023	1	JPN: 103,244

=== Solo songs ===
Year	Title	Details	Ref.
2002	Hanasanaide Ai (離さないで愛)	Featured in DVD Kyakusama wa Kamisama	
2005	Natsu no Owari (夏の終わり)	Performed during program Shounen Club	
2005	Kizuna (絆)	Featured in single Seishūn Amigo	
2006	00'00'16	Featured in DVD Real Face Concert	
2006	Special Happiness	Duet with KAT-TUN member, Junnosuke Taguchi. Featured in album Best of KAT-TUN	
2007	Someday for Somebody	Featured in album Cartoon KAT-TUN II You	
2008	w/o notice??	Featured in single "Don't U Ever Stop"	
2009	1582	Featured in album Break the Records: By You & for You	
2010	Aishiteiru Kara (愛しているから)	Featured in single Love Yourself (Kimi ga Kirai na Kimi ga Suki)	
2010	Into Mine	Performed during stage show Dream Boys	
2010	Plastic Tears	Performed during program Shounen Club	
2010	Sweet	Featured in album No More Pain	
2011	Lost My Way	Performed during stage show Dream Boys	
2012	Bad dream	Performed during stage show Dream Boys	
2012	Zutto (ずっと)	Featured in album Chain	
2014	Emerald	Featured in album Come Here	
2015	Arigatou (ありがとう)	Duet with KAT-TUN member, Tatsuya Ueda. Featured in single KISS KISS KISS	
2015	Hanasanaide Ai (離さないで愛)	Featured in single Dead or Alive	
2016	Vanilla Kiss	Featured in "Bijoude" Jewelry commercial	
2017	~Follow Me~	Featured in single Senaka goshi no Chance	
2018	Wonderful World	Featured in single Ask Yourself	
2018	One way love	Featured in album CAST	
2019	CAN'T CRY	Featured in album IGNITE	
2021	Pure Ice	Featured in single Roar	
2022	Yoru wa Aiteru (夜は空いてる)	Featured in album Honey	
2023	Mikansei na (未完成な)	Featured in album Fantasia	
2025	The Truth	Used as theme song for the sports program "Going! Sports＆News" 15th Anniversary	

=== Albums ===
Year	Title	Details	Ref.
2026	Wave	Release: 2026-07-08; Format: First press limited edition (CD + BR/DVD); Normal edition (CD)	

=== Collaboration songs ===
Year	Title	Details	Ref.
2025	Kame no ongaeshi	Included in Rockon Social Club collaboration album The Show Man	

== Filmography ==
=== Film ===
Year	Title	Role	Notes	Ref.
2009	Gokusen: The Movie	Ryū Odagiri		
2012	Humanoid Monster Bem movie	Bem	Lead role	
2013	It's Me, It's Me	Hitoshi Nagano	Lead role	
2014	The Vancouver Asahi	Roy Naganishi		
2015	Joker Game	Jiro Katou	Lead role	
2017	A Beautiful Star	Kazuo Osugi		
2017	Policeman and Me	Kōta Sagano	Lead role	
2020	Stigmatized Properties	Yamame Yamano	Lead role	
2023	Lumberjack the Monster	Akira Ninomiya	Lead role	
2025	Sham	Michihiko Narumi		
2025	Stigmatized Properties 2	Himself		
2027	Kaiji 4	Kazuya Hyodo		

=== TV dramas ===
Year	Title	Role	Notes	Ref.
1999–2001	Kinpachi-sensei	Akihiko Fukagawa	2 seasons	
2000	Shijou Saiaku no Date	Toru	Lead role; episode 16	
2005	Gokusen	Ryū Odagiri	Season 2	
2005	Kinda'ichi Case Files	Hajime Kindaichi	Lead role	
2005	Nobuta wo Produce	Shūji Kiritani	Lead role	
2006	Supplement	Yūya Ishida	Lead role	
2006	Yuuki	Yūki Sanda	Lead role; television film	
2006	Kuitan SP	Hiroto Kanzaki	Cameo appearance; television film	
2006	Tatta Hitotsu no Koi	Hiroto Kanzaki	Lead role	
2007	Tokkyu Tanaka San Go	Toru Shibahara	Episode 9	
2008	One-Pound Gospel	Kōsaku Hatanaka	Lead role	
2009	Kami no Shizuku	Shizuku Kanzaki	Lead role	
2009	Mr. Brain	Dr. Masakazu Wakui	Episode 3	
2010	The Wallflower	Kyohei Takano	Lead role	
2011	Kinpachi-sensei: Final	Akihiko Fukagawa	Television film	
2011	Yokai Ningen Bem	Bem	Lead role	
2012	Dragon Seinendan	Nazo no Sōsai	Special appearance; episode 9	
2013	Tokyo Bandwagon	Ao Hotta	Lead role	
2015	Second Love	Kei Taira	Lead role	
2016	The Mysterious Thief Yamaneko	Yamaneko	Lead role	
2017	I'm Your Destiny	Makoto Masaki	Lead role	
2017	Jidai wo Tsukutta Otoko Aku Yu Monogatari	Yū Aku	Lead role; television film	
2018	Final Cut	Keisuke Nakamura / Keisuke Hayakawa	Lead role	
2018	Tegami	Naoki Takeshima	Lead role; television film	
2019	Strawberry Night Saga	Kazuo Kikuta	Lead role	
2021	Red Eyes	Kyosuke Fushimi	Lead role	
2021–2023	The Scales of Justice	Kazuya Takano	Lead role; 2 seasons	
2022	Shoutai	Keiichi Kaburagi	Lead role	
2024	Ōoku	Tokugawa Ieharu		
2024	Destiny	Masaki Nogi		
2026	Water Margin	Lin Chong		
2026	Zenigata Heiji	Zenigata Heiji	Lead role; television film	

=== TV programs ===
Year	Program	Role	Ref.
Occasional event	Zoomin!!!Saturday	Producer	
2010–present	Going Sports & News	Baseball reporter/MC	
2008 - 2011	Radio: Ks by Ks	Host	
2011–present	Radio: Hang Out	Host	
2010–present	Dramatic Game	Game commentator	

== Live performances ==
=== Stage shows ===
Year	Title	Role
2002	SHOCK	Dancer
2004	DREAM BOY	Supporting role/dancer
2004	SUMMARY of Johnnys World with NEWS	Lead role
2005	Hey!Say! Dream boy! with Kanjani8	Lead role
2006	DREAM BOYS with Kanjani8	Lead role
2007	DREAM BOYS 2007	Lead role
2008	DREAM BOYS 2008	Lead role
2009	DREAM BOYS 2009	Lead role
2011	DREAM BOYS 2011	Lead role
2012	DREAM BOYS 2012	Lead role
2015	Aoi Shushi wa Taiyo no Naka ni Aru	Lead role
2020	Maigo no Jikan -Kataru Shitsu-	Lead role

=== Concerts ===
Year	Title	Role
2001	Kinki Kids First Concert Boku no Senaka ni wa Hane ga Aru	Backup dancer
2001	Sugao 3	Backup dancer
2003–present	Johnnys Countdown Concert	Johnny's Entertainment performer
2017	KAT-TUN KAZUYA KAMENASHI CONCERT TOUR 2017 Theー ~Follow Me~	Main performer

== Awards ==
Years	Awards
2005	44th Television Drama Academy Awards: Best Supporting Actor - "Gokusen 2"; 8th Nikkan Sports Drama Grand Prix: Best Supporting Actor - "Gokusen 2"
2006	47th Television Drama Academy Awards: Best Actor - "Nobuta wo Produce"; Japan Gold Disc Awards: Song Of The Year - "Seishun Amigo"; 23rd Best Jeans Award: Best Male Jeanist
2007	24th Best Jeans Award: Best Male Jeanist; 1st Astar TV Drama Awards: Best New Asian Star of 2007 for Japan
2008	25th Best Jeans Award: Best Male Jeanist
2009	26th Best Jeans Award: Best Male Jeanist; 12th Nikkan Sports Drama Grand Prix (Winter): Best Actor - "Kami no Shizuku"
2010	13th Nikkan Sports Drama Grand Prix (Winter): Best Actor - "Yamato Nadeshiko Shichi Henge"; 13th Nikkan Sports Drama Grand Prix (Annual): Best Actor - "Yamato Nadeshiko Shichi Henge"; 27th Best Jeans Award: Best Male Jeanist; TV Navi Drama Awards (January–March) : Best Actor - "Yamato Nadeshiko Shichi Henge"
2011	15th Nikkan Sports Drama Grand Prix (Fall): Best Actor - Yokai Ningen Bem; 15th Nikkan Sports Drama Grand Prix (Annual): Best Actor - Yokai Ningen Bem; 71st Television Drama Academy Awards: Best Actor - Yokai Ningen Bem
2013	15th Udine Far East Film Festival, Italy - My Movie Audience Award (It's Me, It's Me)
2016	19th Nikkan Sports Drama Grand Prix (Winter): Best Actor - Kaito Yamaneko
2017	Nikkan Sports Drama Grand Prix (Spring): Best Actor - Boku, Unmei no hito desu
