= Face to Face (KAT-TUN song) =

"Face To Face"

Single by KAT-TUN
- B-side: DRAMATIC; ANO HI NO MAMA; FLASH; LIVE ON
- Released: 15 May 2013
- Recorded: 2013
- Genre: Pop rock
- Label: J-One
- Songwriter(s): AGKY, Andreas Johansson, Laika Leon, Quark not Dirty
- Producer(s): Johnny H. Kitagawa

KAT-TUN singles chronology
"Expose" (2012)	"Face To Face" (2013)	"In Fact" (2014)

"Face To Face" is the 21st single by Japanese boy band KAT-TUN. The song "Face To Face" is the theme song for member Kamenashi Kazuya’s movie Ore Ore (It’s Me, It’s Me) which is scheduled to open in theaters on 25 May 2013. This will mark the first time for the group to sing the theme song for a movie.

== Single information ==
The single will be released with three different types; limited edition, first pressed regular edition, and regular edition. Both limited and first pressed regular editions will come with a DVD, and the first pressed regular edition will include a coupling track titled “FLASH“, a solo song by Taguchi Junnosuke. The regular edition will only have a CD, and one of the coupling tracks will be “DRAMATIC” which is the image song for NTV’s live coverage of professional baseball game ‘Dramatic Game 1844′, and is also used as the theme song for NTV’s ‘Going! Sports&News’.

== Chart performance ==
In its first week of its release, the single topped the Oricon singles chart, reportedly selling 131,843 copies. With this single, their number of consecutive singles topping the chart has reached 21, as they’ve been topping the chart since their debut single “Real Face” (released in March 2006). KAT-TUN placed at no. 16 in the second weeks, reportedly selling 10,546 copies and in the third weeks of its release the single placed at no. 32, reportedly selling 3,491 copies.

By the end of the year, Face To Face was reported by Oricon to sell 150,310 copies and was later certified Gold by RIAJ denoting over 100,000 shipments.

== Track listing ==
Regular Edition
No.	Title	Lyrics	Music	Length
1.	"FACE to Face"	AGKY	Andreas Johansson, Laika Leon, Quark not Dirty
2.	"DRAMATIC"	Laika Leon	Billy Marx Jr.
3.	"ANO HI NO MAMA (あの日のまま)"	Nai-T	twenty forty
4.	"FACE to Face" (Original Karaoke オリジナル・カラオケ)
5.	"DRAMATIC" (Original Karaoke オリジナル・カラオケ)
6.	"ANO HI NO MAMA (あの日のまま)" (Original Karaoke オリジナル・カラオケ)

CD + DVD, Limited Edition
No.	Title	Lyrics	Music	Length
1.	"FACE to Face"	AGKY	Andreas Johansson, Laika Leon, Quark not Dirty
2.	"LIVE ON"	RUCCA	RAT-0124, DREADSTORE COWBOY
4.	"FACE to Face" (Video clip + Making clip ビデオ・クリップ＋メイキング)

CD + DVD, Regular Edition (First Press)
No.	Title	Lyrics	Music	Length
1.	"FACE to Face"	AGKY	Andreas Johansson, Laika Leon, Quark not Dirty
2.	"FLASH (田口淳之介ソロ曲)(music video)"	Junnosuke Taguchi	Daniel Sherman, Andy Gilbert, Claire Rodrigues, TAKAROT
3.	"SPECIAL EIZOU (video)"

== Charts ==
Chart	Peak	Sales
Japan Oricon Weekly Chart	1	131,843
Japan Oricon Monthly Chart	4	145,880
Japan Oricon Yearly Chart	45	150,310
