= Fumetsu no Scrum =

Single by KAT-TUN
- B-side: in the DARK; BLACK OR WHITE; RADIO
- Released: September 12, 2012
- Recorded: 2012
- Genre: Pop rock
- Label: J-One
- Songwriter(s): masanco, JOKER, Janne Hyöty, Caroline Gustavsson
- Producer(s): Johnny H. Kitagawa

KAT-TUN singles chronology
"To the Limit" (2012)	"Fumetsu no Scrum" (2012)	"Expose" (2013)

"Fumetsu no Scrum" is the nineteenth single by Japanese boy band KAT-TUN. The song "Fumetsu no Scrum" is the theme song for MBS/TBS’s drama. “Dragon Seinendan” stars Yasuda Shota, who is a member of Kanjani 8, and is Yasuda’s first solo serial drama. The drama tells the story of the opening of a door that takes one away from daily life into a fantasy.

== Single information ==
Nineteenth single release from KAT-TUN featuring the theme of TV series Dragon Seinendan starring Yasuda Shota. With lyrics like “Chase your dreams with your buddies!”, “Fumetsu no Scrum” is a song describing the bond that exists among friends. Always game for new challenges, KAT-TUN is releasing the single as the first part of a new project. In addition to the “Fumetsu no Scrum”, there will also be member Tanaka Koki’s solo track along with the inclusion of the PV in the first press regular edition of the single. This will be linked to the solo PVs of the other members in subsequent KAT-TUN singles. Furthermore, the release will include a special clip featuring all five KAT-TUN members and it has been said that the choreography to the song was created by member Taguchi Junnosuke.

== Chart performance ==
In its first week of its release, the single topped the Oricon singles chart, reportedly selling 157,059 copies. This is KAT-TUN’s 19th consecutive single to top the single charts since debuting with “Real Face” back in March 2006 and continued to hold the most consecutive number one singles since debut with fellow Johnny's group, NEWS. KAT-TUN placed at no.7 in the second weeks, reportedly selling 11,862 copies and in the third weeks of its release the single placed at no.20, reportedly selling 3,366 copies.

By the end of the year, Fumetsu no Scrum was reported by Oricon to sell 175,936 and was later certified Gold by RIAJ denoting over 100,000 shipments.

== Track listing ==
Regular Edition
No.	Title	Lyrics	Music	Length
1.	"Fumetsu no Scrum (不滅のスクラム)"	masanco, JOKER	Janne Hyöty, Caroline Gustavsson	03:30
2.	"RADIO"	miwa*, SHIROSE	雨宮康夫, SHIROSE, AARON KAI, DREADSTORE COWBOY	04:14
3.	"Fumetsu no Scrum" (Original Karaoke オリジナル・カラオケ)
4.	"RADIO" (Original Karaoke オリジナル・カラオケ)

CD + DVD, Limited Edition
No.	Title	Lyrics	Music	Length
1.	"Fumetsu no Scrum (不滅のスクラム)"	masanco, JOKER	Janne Hyöty, Caroline Gustavsson
2.	"in the DARK"	KOUDAI IWATSUBO	Jon Hällgren, KOUDAI IWATSUBO, FLYING GRIND	04:10
3.	"Fumetsu no Scrum" (Video clip + Making clip ビデオ・クリップ＋メイキング)			00:34:53
4.	"in the DARK" (Original Karaoke オリジナル・カラオケ)

CD + DVD, Regular First Pressed Edition
No.	Title	Lyrics	Music	Length
1.	"Fumetsu no Scrum (不滅のスクラム)"	masanco, JOKER	Janne Hyöty, Caroline Gustavsson
2.	"BLACK OR WHITE (Tanaka Solo)"	Tanaka Koki	Tom Diekmeier, Junior H Johansson	03:55
3.	"BLACK OR WHITE" (Video clip + Special Documentary)

== Chart ==
Chart	Peak	Sales
Japan Oricon Weekly Chart	1	157,059
Japan Oricon Monthly Chart	4	172,287
Japan Oricon Yearly Chart	39	175,936
