= Expose (song) =

Single by KAT-TUN
- B-side: Steps to Love; Brand New Day; Connect & Go; Snowflake; Haruka higashi no sora e
- Released: February 6, 2013
- Recorded: 2013
- Genre: Pop rock
- Label: J-One
- Songwriters: miwa, Erik Sahlen, Yoko Hiramatsu
- Producer: Johnny H. Kitagawa

KAT-TUN singles chronology
| "Fumetsu no Scrum" (2012) | "Expose" (2013) | "Face To Face" (2013) |

"Expose" 」（エクスポーズ） is the 20th single by Japanese boy band KAT-TUN. The song "Expose" is the theme song for the Suzuki Solio Bandit TV-CM. The single was to have included the CM songs for Suzuki's 'Solio', "Steps to Love", "Brand New Day", and "Connect & Go".

== Single information ==
Regular edition includes two new songs and their instrumental versions. Limited Editions 1 includes "Steps to Love" and "Brand New Day" as B-side songs and comes with a DVD including a promotion video and as well as an original video produced by Yuichi Nakamaru. Limited Editions 2 includes "Connect & Go" as the B-side. Comes with a DVD including a promotion video for "Connect & Go" as well as the music video for Yuichi Nakamaru's solo song. Jacket designs are different between Limited Editions and regular edition.

== Chart performance ==
In its first week of its release, the single topped the Oricon singles chart, reportedly selling 154,710 copies. With this single, their number of consecutive singles topping the chart has reached 20, as they've been topping the chart since their debut single “Real Face” (released in March 2006). KAT-TUN is the second artist (including both male/female and solo/group) to top the single chart for 20 consecutive singles since the debut. It was only achieved by their senior KinKi Kids 8 years and a month ago with “Anniversary” (released in December 2004). KinKi Kids is still renewing their record, and their number is now 32 consecutive singles since their debut single “Glass no Shounen” (released in July 1997). KAT-TUN placed at no.8 in the second weeks, reportedly selling 10,998 copies and in the third weeks of its release the single placed at no.23, reportedly selling 3,265 copies.

By the end of the year, Expose was reported by Oricon to sell 173,400 copies and was later certified Gold by RIAJ denoting over 100,000 shipments.

== Track listing ==
Regular Edition
| No. | Title | Lyrics | Music | Length |
|---|---|---|---|---|
| 1. | "EXPOSE" | miwa* | Erik Sahlen, Yoko.Hiramatsu | 04:33 |
| 2. | "Haruka higashi no sora e (遙か東の空へ)" | ORI | Kei Yoshikawa | 04:47 |
| 3. | "EXPOSE" (Original Karaoke オリジナル・カラオケ) |
| 4. | "Haruka higashi no sora e (遙か東の空へ)" (Original Karaoke オリジナル・カラオケ) |

CD + DVD, Limited Edition 1
| No. | Title | Lyrics | Music | Length |
|---|---|---|---|---|
| 1. | "EXPOSE" | miwa* | Erik Sahlen, Yoko.Hiramatsu |
| 2. | "STEPS TO LOVE" | Cootie, miwa* | Charlie Mason, Ronald Soelkner, Daniel Nitt | 03:54 |
| 3. | "BRAND NEW DAY" | ORI | King of slick | 03:57 |
| 4. | "EXPOSE" (Video clip + Making clip ビデオ・クリップ＋メイキング) |

CD + DVD, Limited Edition 2
| No. | Title | Lyrics | Music | Length |
|---|---|---|---|---|
| 1. | "EXPOSE" | miwa* | Erik Sahlen, Yoko.Hiramatsu |
| 2. | "Connect & Go" | miwa* | ROCK STONE, Daddylong, Robert Vadadi | 04:03 |
| 3. | "Snowflake (Nakamaru Solo)" | Yuichi Nakamaru | King of slick, Kiyohito Komatsu | 04:27 |
| 4. | "Connect & Go" (Video clip + Making clip ビデオ・クリップ＋メイキング) |
| 5. | "Snowflake (Nakamaru Solo) (music video)" |

== Chart ==
| Chart | Peak | Sales |
|---|---|---|
| Japan Oricon Weekly Chart | 1 | 154,710 |
| Japan Oricon Monthly Chart | 3 | 170,759 |
| Japan Oricon Yearly Chart | 36 | 173,400 |
