= Kiss Kiss Kiss (KAT-TUN song) =

Single by KAT-TUN
- B-side: Phantom; Ray; Kirarito; Arigatou; Race Goes On; Nothing Else Matters
- Released: 11 March 2015
- Recorded: 2015
- Genre: Pop rock
- Label: J-One
- Songwriter(s): 25→graffiti, Ocean94
- Producer(s): Johnny H. Kitagawa

KAT-TUN singles chronology
"Dead Or Alive" (2015)	"Kiss Kiss Kiss" (2015)	"Tragedy" (2016)

"Kiss Kiss Kiss" is the 24th single by Japanese boy band KAT-TUN, released in Japan on March 11, 2015, on the J-One Records label. The song will be used as theme song for the new TV Asahi drama "Second Love" start Feb 6 starring member Kamenashi Kazuya. The group has finished their solo member music video project tied with their single releases and with the new single, the group has a new project called "Shuffle KAT-TUN". Included in the single are two new songs each featuring two pairs; Taguchi Junnosuke and Nakamaru Yuichi / Kamenashi Kazuya and Ueda Tatsuya. The last time the group featured duets in a release was during their debut album "Best of KAT-TUN". The unit songs are titled Kirarito and Arigatou with the members writing the lyrics for their songs.

== Single information ==
"Kiss Kiss Kiss" is the twenty-four single release from KAT-TUN. The release comes in three versions - Regular Edition, Limited Edition 1, and Limited Edition 2. All versions of the album include "Kiss Kiss Kiss". The Regular Edition contains six track, with "Race Goes On", "Nothing Else Matters" and original karaoke included. The Limited Edition 1 contains four tracks, with "Phantom", original karaoke included and comes with a bonus DVD with the title song and its making-of. The Limited Edition 2 includes "Kirarito" and "Arigatou" on CD.

== Track listing ==
Regular Edition
No.	Title	Lyrics	Music	Length
1.	"Kiss Kiss Kiss"	25→graffiti	Ocean94
2.	"Race Goes On"	NOYCE'	King of slick
3.	"Nothing Else Matters"	RUCCA	Jon Hallgren, Peter Boyes
4.	"Kiss Kiss Kiss" (Original Karaoke オリジナル・カラオケ)
5.	"Race Goes On" (Original Karaoke オリジナル・カラオケ)
6.	"Nothing Else Matters" (Original Karaoke オリジナル・カラオケ)

CD + DVD, Limited Edition 1
No.	Title	Lyrics	Music	Length
1.	"Kiss Kiss Kiss"	25→graffiti	Ocean94
2.	"Phantom"	KAHLUA	Manabu Marutani, Kenichi Takemoto, Command Freaks
3.	"Phantom" (Original Karaoke オリジナル・カラオケ)
4.	"Kiss Kiss Kiss" (Video clip + Making clip ビデオ・クリップ+メイキング)

CD + DVD, Limited Edition 2
No.	Title	Lyrics	Music	Length
1.	"Kiss Kiss Kiss"	25→graffiti	Ocean94
2.	"Ray"	FOREST YOUNG	TKMZ Victor Newman
3.	"Kirarito"	Taguchi Junnosuke and Nakamaru Yuichi	Albi Albertsson, DAICHI, MUSSASHI
4.	"Arigatou"	Ueda Tatsuya	Kei Yoshikawa, Eiji Kawai
5.	"Ray" (Original Karaoke オリジナル・カラオケ)
6.	"Shuffle KAT-TUN" (Video clip)

== Chart performance ==
"Kiss Kiss Kiss" debuted at the number one spot on the Oricon weekly single chart, selling over 153,457 copies in its first week of release. This was the 24th consecutive number-one single for KAT-TUN, putting them in second place behind Kinki Kids with 34 consecutive number-one singles since debuting.

Chart	Peak	Sales
Japan Oricon Weekly Chart	1	153,457
Japan Oricon Monthly Chart	6	163,263
Japan Oricon Yearly Chart	41	166,122
