= Chain (KAT-TUN album) =

Studio album by KAT-TUN
- Released: February 22, 2012
- Recorded: 2012
- Genre: Pop rock
- Label: J-One
- Producer: Johnny H. Kitagawa (executive)

KAT-TUN chronology
No More Pain (2010)	Chain (2012)	Kusabi (2013)

Singles from Chain
- 1. "Change Ur World" Released: November 17, 2010; 2. "Ultimate Wheels" Released: February 2, 2011; 3. "White" Released: May 18, 2011; 4. "Run for You" Released: August 3, 2011; 5. "Birth" Released: November 30, 2011

Chain is the Sixth studio album by Japanese boy band KAT-TUN and was released in Japan on February 22, 2012, by J-One Records. On January 13, KAT-TUN endorsed the mobile game site "entag!" which used KAT-TUN's album track "Smile for You" as a CM song and the first-ever KAT-TUN animation, "Ai wa KAT-TUN", voiced by KAT-TUN themselves, was launched on entag! site for a limited period. Ai wa KAT-TUN hit 1,000,000 views in just 2 weeks.

== Album information ==
Sixth album release from KAT-TUN including five single tracks, seven new songs, and five new songs featuring member's solo part (total of 17 songs). Regular Edition contains a bonus hidden track, "CHAIN OF LOVE". The jacket design used for the limited edition is different from the one used for the regular edition. This edition includes a lyrics card. The jacket design used for the limited edition is different from the one used for the regular edition. This edition includes a bonus DVD with music video(s) and bonus video footage. Comes with a booklet.

== Chart performance ==
In its first week of its release, the album topped the Oricon album chart, reportedly selling 110,055 copies. This feat will mark their sixth consecutive album to top the Oricon Album Charts since their first album, “Best of KAT-TUN” (released in March 2006). This record has surpassed rock band The Checker's record of topping five consecutive albums and with this, KAT-TUN broke the record for the first time in 24 years and 10 months. KAT-TUN placed at No.8 in the second weeks, reportedly selling 10,761 copies and in the third weeks of its release the single placed at No.25, reportedly selling 4,235 copies.

By the end of the year, Chain was reported to selling 133,262 copies and was later certified Gold by RIAJ denoting over 100,000 shipments.

== Track listing ==
No.	Title	Writer(s)	Length
1.	"Lock On"	Sean-D, Albi Albertsson
2.	"One Day"	Sean-D, JUNKOO / ROCK STONE
3.	"Birth"	Sean-D, Janne Hyöty / DAICHI / Paul Oxley, Billy Marx Jr.
4.	"Ultimate Wheels"	Laika Leon / Jane Doe, Andreas Johansson / Anderz Wrethov, Billy Marx Jr. / Yukihide "YT" Takiyama
5.	"Finale" (Junnosuke Taguchi Solo)	Junnosuke Taguchi / NAO
6.	"Step By Step" (Yūichi Nakamaru solo)	Andreas Johansson / Karol"Kase"Cholopecki, Eiji Kawai
7.	"Run for You"	Sean-D, GOOD COP / SWE-LO, 18degrees.（Ken Arai）
8.	"Ano Hi no you ni"	miwa*, Joker, Masaya Wada（RzC）, Billy Marx Jr.
9.	"Zutto" (Kazuya Kamenashi solo)	Hiroshi Okazaki / t-oga
10.	"Smile For You"	Yuichi Yagi / ECO, Go Fisher Sato
11.	"Hakanai Yubisaki"	Mika Watanabe, Ryosuke "Dr.R" Sakai, Billy Marx Jr.
12.	"~Again" (Tatsuya Ueda Solo)	MOUSE PEACE "Tatsuya", MOUSE PEACE "Masami", Tomoki Kikuya
13.	"Change Ur World"	Laika Leon / ECO, Joker, Andreas Johansson / Anderz Wrethov, JUNYT
14.	"Dangerous Cat ~MAKE ME WET~" (Tanaka Koki Solo)	Joker, Keichi Kondo
15.	"Hodoukyou"	KOUDAI IWATSUBO / ECO, KOUDAI IWATSUBO
16.	"White"	ECO, Joker, Shusui / DAICHI, pinkcastar
17.	"Soldier"	Laika Leon, King of slick / Albi Albertsson / Kirstine Lind
18.	"Chain of Love" (Bonus hidden track for regular edition only)	COOTIE、MASANCO、t-oga / EDBERGER NIKLAS

== Charts ==
Chart	Peak	Sales
Japan Oricon Weekly Chart	1	110,055
Japan Oricon Monthly Chart	3	120,816
Japan Oricon Yearly Chart	47	133,262
