= No More Pain =

Studio album by KAT-TUN
- Released: June 16, 2010
- Recorded: 2010
- Genre: Pop rock
- Label: J-One
- Producer: Johnny H. Kitagawa (executive)

KAT-TUN chronology
Break the Records: By You & for You (2009)	No More Pain (2010)	Chain (2012)

Singles from No More Pain
- 1. "Love Yourself (Kimi ga Kirai na Kimi ga Suki)" Released: February 10, 2010; 2. "Going!" Released: May 12, 2010

No More Pain (stylized as NO MORE PAIИ) is the fifth studio album by Japanese boy band KAT-TUN and was released in Japan on June 16, 2010 by J-One Records. The album was released in two editions: a limited-edition version with a DVD and a regular edition which features the bonus track, "Hello".

== Album information ==
Fifth album release from KAT-TUN including solo song by each member and more for 14 tunes total. Regular edition includes a bonus track "Hello". Limited edition includes a bonus DVD with the music video form the album and making-of. Features alternate jacket artwork. Adam Greenburg on Allmusic gave the album three out of five stars, stating that "The album doesn't deliver anything new to the world of Japanese boy bands, but it keeps Kat-Tun in form. They don't obviously improve on previous works or detract from their legacy, as it were. Perfectly middle of the road."

== Chart performance ==
No More Pain debuted at No.1 on Oricon Weekly Album Chart as of June 28 with first week sales of 154,096 copies and making KAT-TUN the first male group in 9 years to have 5 consecutive No.1 original albums after Kinki Kids from 1996-2001.

By the end of the year, the album was reported by Oricon to sell 182,563 copies and was later certified Gold by RIAJ denoting over 100,000 shipments.

== Track listing ==
Track	Lyrics	Composition
1. N.M.P	MASANCO / SEAN-D Rap Lyrics: Joker	STEVEN LEE
2. Love yourself ~Kimi ga kirai na kimi ga suki~	Eco Rap Lyrics: Joker	Taku Yoshioka
3. Faraway	MASANCO	KING OF SLICK
4. The D-Motion	ECO English Lyrics co-ordinated by JIN AKANISHI	OSCAR HOLTER / JAKKE ERIXSON
5. Right Now	ECO Rap Lyrics JOKER	STEVEN LEE
6. Rockin' All Nite	MASANCO Rap Lyrics JOKER	DREADSTORE COWBOY
7. Going!	ECO Rap Lyrics JOKER	TAKU YOSHIOKA
8. Sweet (Kamenashi Kazuya Solo)	N	GYO KITAGAWA
9. Love Music (Taguchi Junnosuke Solo)	TAGUCHI JUNNOSUKE	NAO
10. Make U Wet ~Chapter 2~ (Tanaka Koki Solo)	JOKER	NAO TANAKA
11. Rabbit or Wolf? (Ueda Tatsuya Solo)	UEDA TATSUYA	EIJI KAWAI
12. Film (Nakamaru Yuichi Solo)	NAKAMARU YUICHI / T-OGA	KING OF SLICK
13. Promise Song	KATSUHIKO KUROSU	KAORU OKUBO

== Charts and certifications ==
Chart (2010)	Peak position
Japan Oricon Weekly Album Chart	1
Japan Oricon Yearly Album Chart	35

=== Sales and certifications ===
Country	Provider	Sales	Certification
Japan	RIAJ	182,563	Gold
