= KAT-TUN =

Japanese boy band

- Origin: Tokyo
- Genres: J-pop; rock
- Years active: 2001–2025
- Labels: J-One Records; J Storm
- Past members: Kazuya Kamenashi; Jin Akanishi; Junnosuke Taguchi; Koki Tanaka; Tatsuya Ueda; Yuichi Nakamaru
- Website: J Storm; STARTO ENTERTAINMENT

KAT-TUN (カトゥーン, Katūn) was a Japanese boy band under Starto Entertainment. Their formation under Johnny & Associates was in 2001. The group's name was originally an acronym based on the first letter of each member's family name: Kazuya Kamenashi, Jin Akanishi, Junnosuke Taguchi, Koki Tanaka, Tatsuya Ueda, and Yuichi Nakamaru. Their debut on March 22, 2006, was marked by a tripartite release of a CD single, album and music DVD on their exclusive record label J-One Records. Since then, all of their single, album and music DVD releases have debuted at number one on the Oricon music and DVD charts.

In 2010, Akanishi left the group to start a solo career, making the group's acronym then come from Kamenashi, Taguchi, Tanaka, Ueda, and Nakamaru, and the group toured with five members. In 2013, Tanaka's contract was terminated for several violations, leaving KAT-TUN as a four-man ensemble, and Tatsuya Ueda took the T to keep the acronym. By the end of March 2016, Taguchi left both the group and the agency, leaving KAT-TUN with only three remaining members.

On February 12, 2025, the members announced they would disband on March 31.

== History ==
=== 2001–2005: Formation and pre-debut activities ===
Before becoming KAT-TUN, each member belonged to different trainee units within Johnny & Associates. In 2001, eight members were chosen to become a temporary dancing unit in order to support Koichi Domoto in the NHK music program, Pop Jam. The eight members were switched around before it officially became KAT-TUN, with the current three members plus Jin Akanishi, Koki Tanaka and Junnosuke Taguchi. Although the formation was only meant to be a temporary support unit, KAT-TUN gained a great deal of attention and became a solid unit.

In 2002, in response to many requests, KAT-TUN held their first concert called Okyaku-sama wa Kami-summer - Concert 55man Nin Ai no Request ni Kotaete!! (お客様は神サマーConcert 55万人愛のリクエストに応えて!!), for which 550,000 people tried to get tickets. That same year, they performed eleven shows in a single day. This is the current record in Japan for the most performances in one day. Since then, KAT-TUN has held concerts in Japan almost every season.

In 2003–2004, their popularity rose to that of a debuted group, to the point where they performed on Music Station multiple times before debuting. In 2005, KAT-TUN released their first major DVD, KAT-TUN Live Kaizokuban (KAT-TUN Live海賊帆; lit. KAT-TUN Live: Pirate Sails), which topped the Oricon yearly chart for the best-selling DVD. At the 20th Japan Gold Disc Awards, Live Kaizokuban placed on the Music Video Of The Year list.

=== 2006: Debut and Best of KAT-TUN ===
On March 22, KAT-TUN released their debut single "Real Face", accompanied by an album, Best of KAT-TUN and a DVD Real Face Film. These were released on their own label J-One Records. The group also went on a nationwide tour, Live of KAT-TUN "Real Face", in support of the album. Within the first week, Best of KAT-TUN, "Real Face" and Real Face Film topped all three Oricon weekly charts by selling 556,548 copies, 754,234 copies and 374,202 copies respectively Total 1,684,984 copies. They became the second artists to do so, the first being Ayumi Hamasaki. With these numbers, KAT-TUN holds the record for the highest weekly single debut sales (previously held by Arashi with their debut single "Arashi" of 557,000 copies sold in 1999). In addition, "Real Face" topped the Oricon charts for three weeks straight, becoming the first debut single to do so in Japan in 8 years 8 months since KinKi Kids' debut single "Garasu no Shōnen." The single sold over a million copies in nine weeks, making "Real Face" the highest selling single for the year 2006.

In March 2006, KAT-TUN became the first group to hold their own performances in Japan's most popular stadium, Tokyo Dome, before debuting. They performed to 110,000 people over two days and about 630,000 people in total during the tour. About three months after releasing "Real Face", KAT-TUN released their second single, "Signal", on July 19.

On October 12, member Akanishi announced a hiatus from the group in order to study linguistics abroad in the United States, leaving KAT-TUN as a five-member group for six months. The remaining members continued activities by releasing their third single, "Bokura no Machi de" as the theme song to members Kamenashi and Tanaka's drama, Tatta Hitotsu no Koi and their second album, Cartoon KAT-TUN II You on December 7.

KAT-TUN is the first group in Japan to have all three singles from debut to exceed 500,000 in yearly sales, taking first, fifth and thirteenth place on the Oricon yearly singles chart.

=== 2007: Cartoon KAT-TUN II You ===
Under the same name as their second album, KAT-TUN started their second nationwide tour, Tour 2007 Cartoon KAT-TUN II You, still without Akanishi, on April 3. The next day, KAT-TUN began to host their own variety show Cartoon KAT-TUN, which aired every Wednesday from 11:55 p.m. to 12:26 a.m.

Akanishi returned to Japan on April 19 and officially resumed work activities on April 20. Akanishi joined the rest of KAT-TUN during their tour on April 21 in Sendai for the encore, marking his official return to KAT-TUN.

On June 6, KAT-TUN released their fourth single, "Yorokobi no Uta", as the theme song to Tanaka's drama, Tokkyu Tanaka 3 Go.

On November 21, they simultaneously released their fifth single, "Keep the Faith", as the theme song to members Akanishi and Taguchi's drama, Yukan Club, and the DVD to their Tokyo Dome Live of KAT-TUN "Real Face" concert. The DVD marked their fifth consecutive release topping the Oricon musical DVD chart, and set the opening week record for the year. KAT-TUN took the annual number one position on the Oricon musical DVD charts for the third time in a row with the release.

After KinKi Kids, KAT-TUN is the second artist to have all singles since debut to exceed 300,000 in sales during their first week.

=== 2008: Queen of Pirates ===
KAT-TUN released 'Lips', the theme song to Kamenashi's drama based on the manga One Pound Gospel, as their sixth single on February 6. The single topped at number one on the Oricon charts.

KAT-TUN released their seventh single "Don't U Ever Stop" on May 14, which topped the weekly Oricon chart. On May 15, during the MC segment promoting "Don't U Ever Stop" on Music Station, Kamenashi announced that two shows had been added to their Tokyo Dome tour dates, resulting in a total of four consecutive days at the Dome. This marked a historic event in the Dome's history, as KAT-TUN became the first Japanese artist to hold four consecutive days at the stadium since it opened in 1988. Other Japanese artists, such as SMAP, X Japan and Ayumi Hamasaki have had three consecutive days at the Dome. The Rolling Stones and Michael Jackson have played multiple days at the Dome, but they were not consecutive.

On June 4, KAT-TUN released their third album, KAT-TUN III: Queen of Pirates.

On December 3, KAT-TUN released "White X'mas", their first Christmas single.

On December 21, it was announced that KAT-TUN would release a new single "One Drop" as a tie-in theme song to Kamenashi's new drama, Kami no Shizuku, just two months after their "White X'mas" single. The release consisted of three versions: Limited Edition w/DVD, Regular Edition (First Press) and a Regular Edition.

=== 2009–2010: Break the Records: By You & For You, Akanishi Jin's departure and No More Pain ===
On February 10, KAT-TUN released their first single since March 2009, which was used for Kamenashi's live-action drama adaptation of Tomoko Hayakawa's manga series Yamato Nadeshiko Shichi Henge, which premiered January 15 on TBS. The single, "Love Yourself (Kimi ga Kirai na Kimi ga Suki)", debuted at number one on the Oricon weekly singles chart, resulting in KAT-TUN's eleventh consecutive number one single since their debut. It became KAT-TUN's first single to sell more than 350,000 copies in its first week since the May 2008 release of their single "Don't U Ever Stop", which sold more than 381,000 copies in its first week.

On March 24, Johnny & Associates announced that KAT-TUN would go on their first Asia concert tour as a five-member group while Akanishi held his own solo concerts in the United States, making him the first Johnny's artist to perform solo in the United States. KAT-TUN is set to have their Asia Tour from early May to late August and although the majority of the concerts will be held in Japan, KAT-TUN will also be heading to Bangkok on July 31, Seoul from August 6 to 7, and Taipei from August 27 to 28; other sources say that a Hawaii concert is also being considered. Due to his absence from KAT-TUN's Asia concert tour and single promotions, Akanishi did not participate in the recording of KAT-TUN's twelfth single "Going!" set for release on May 12. Due to the political unrest in Thailand, Johnny & Associates announced on May 15 that KAT-TUN's concert in Bangkok would be indefinitely postponed.

KAT-TUN released their first 2010 album, No More Pain, on June 16 in two versions: a limited and regular edition that both include solo songs by each member. The limited edition contains thirteen songs and a bonus DVD with the PVs and making-of's the album's songs while the regular edition contains a bonus track.

Johnny & Associates announced on July 17 that Akanishi would leave the group in late 2010 to pursue a solo career while the rest of the members would continue to work as a five-member group. On July 21, Akanishi himself confirmed through the official Johnny's mobile site, Johnny's Web, that he would leave KAT-TUN to focus on his solo career, although he had not appeared on any event to his fans until October.

KAT-TUN continued as a group of five. On August 28, the last day of their World Big Tour 2010, KAT-TUN revealed their 2011 tour plan to celebrate their fifth anniversary by performing at industrial complexes in five cities in Japan and expanding its overseas tour to five different countries including Korea, Taiwan, Thailand, China, and Hawaii. The Hawaii concert would make them the first Johnny artist to hold a concert in Hawaii. The World Big Tour is where former member Tanaka Koki gave the name "hyphens" to the fans, saying that the fans unite KAT-TUN together.

On October 13, KAT-TUN announced the release of their new single, "Change Ur World", which was KAT-TUN's 13th single and the first single after Akanishi's official departure, was released on November 17. The single debuted at number one on the Oricon weekly singles chart for selling 230,829 copies, resulting in KAT-TUN's thirteenth consecutive number one single since their debut plus all of their 13 singles sold over 200,000 copies in the first week.

On December 29, KAT-TUN released KAT-TUN -NO MORE PAIИ- WORLD TOUR 2010 DVD, featuring their last day in Japan leg of their successful World Big Tour 2010 at Kyocera Dome and more concert footages from their Korea and Taiwan legs.

=== 2011: Fifth anniversary ===
The group announced a release of their 14th single on 2010s Christmas Eve, "Ultimate Wheels" on February 2, 2011, along with a tie-in CM of Suzuki Solio car that the group endorsed. On January 6, KAT-TUN announced its plan of KAT-TUN Live Tour 2011 during May to October. The tour includes the 5 big dome tour at Sapporo Dome, Tokyo Dome, Nagoya Dome, Yahoo Dome in Fukuoka, and Kyocera Dome in Osaka and a special live event in Kawasaki on July 17–19. KAT-TUN will become the fourth Johnny group to be able to conquer the 5 big domes in Japan after SMAP, KinKi Kids and Arashi. After October, the group will start their Asia Tour that includes Thailand, Taiwan, and Korea. "Ultimate Wheels" became their 14th straight No.1 single since their debut. The total number of copies sold in the first week was over 180,000 copies, reported by Oricon. Early March, KAT-TUN announced three new songs in three days, including "Perfect" for Kamenashi's new Aoki TV commercial, "White" for a Sofina commercial, and "Diamond" as the theme song of NTV telecasts of Yomiuri Giants baseball games.

It was announced on March 29 that Johnny's Company would start a new charity project called Marching J, a fundraising project for the Tohoku earthquake victims. The first part of the project started as an event held from April 1 through April 3. From the company, SMAP, Tokio, KinKi Kids, V6, Arashi, Tackey and Tsubasa, NEWS, Kanjani8, KAT-TUN, Hey! Say! JUMP and some of Johnny's Juniors participated in this first event. The first event will be held in Tokyo, in front of the first Yoyogi gymnasium. Groups took turns according to their schedule and will have a talk session in front of the fans, also calling out for donations for the earthquake victims. And due to this disaster, all the planned events to celebrate KAT-TUN's 5th debut anniversary were canceled.

On May 18, KAT-TUN's 15th single, "White", was released with "Perfect" as its coupling song. By this time, they also announced another two new songs, "Cosmic Child" for a Wing TV commercial, and "Run For You" for a New Suzuki Solio commercial. On May 29, KAT-TUN with all its five members joined another Marching J project, "Johnny's Charity Baseball Tournament" with other Johnny artists and juniors at Tokyo Dome, in which the ticket sales would be donated for Japan's earthquake and tsunami victims.

It was announced in mid-June that members Kazuya Kamenashi, Koki Tanaka and Yuichi Nakamaru would star in this year's Dream Boy musicals as the leads, shows will commence from September 3 to 25.

On September 8, 2011, it was confirmed that KAT-TUN would host a new TV show titled KAT-TUN no Zettai Manetaku Naru TV, their first show since Cartoon KAT-TUN ended in March 2010. The new show began airing on October 18 on NTV. During the broadcast of the first episode, it was revealed that the show will only air for a limited time until the end of December 2011 with a total of 10 episodes. On September 30, 2011, KAT-TUN announced their 17th single "Birth" as the soundtrack to Kamenashi Kazuya's drama "Youkai Ningen Bem" would have been released on November 30. "Birth" became their 17th straight No.1 single on the Oricon's weekly chart since their debut.

=== 2012: Chain ===
KAT-TUN began their new year with an extreme special TV show titled KAT-TUN no Sekaiichi Dame Yoru Ni, a one-off show broadcast on the night of January 1 on TBS. A few weeks later they announced the release of their sixth album, titled Chain, scheduled for release on February 22. On January 13, KAT-TUN endorsed the mobile game site Entag which used KAT-TUN's album track "Smile for You" as the commercial song and the first-ever KAT-TUN animation, "Ai wa KAT-TUN", voiced by KAT-TUN themselves, was launched on The Entag site for a limited period. On February 11, they kicked off their nationwide tour "KAT-TUN Live Tour 2012 Chain". This tour covered 12 cities, including Sendai. The tour started in Niigata and will end in Sendai. They will become the first Johnnys group to perform in the affected areas after the earthquake and tsunami disaster. Music Station presented on Jan 13 with a special report for the 'Most Powerful Group BEST 20' which listed the Top 20 most powerful groups of all time in terms of physical single and album sales, KAT-TUN was listed at number 16 with their five-year debut, 17 singles and 5 albums, together they have sold over 8,450,000 records. Music Station hints to this ranking included the debut single 'Real Face' which became 2006's number 1 selling single and how they managed to hold 8 consecutive concerts at Tokyo Dome. Among the groups in Top 20, KAT-TUN is apparently the newest group on the list.

KAT-TUN's 6th studio album, "CHAIN", reached No.1 on Oricon album ranking on March 5, making them the first male artist in history to have six consecutive No.1 albums ever since the debut. KAT-TUN broke the record for the first time in 24 years and 10 months. On March 8, it was announced that the second episode of KAT-TUN no Sekaiichi Dame Yoru Ni will be aired on April 3.

Official confirmations for the upcoming 2012 shows for Johnny's long-running Dream Boys musicals were released, and once again member Kamenashi reprises his role as the main lead for the musical. According to confirmation, the shows will begin in September. On April 20–22, KAT-TUN performed at Tokyo Dome as parts of their LIVE TOUR 2012 CHAIN tour. According to news reports, KAT-TUN's original idea "Flash-Tree" spotlights was introduced for the first time in Johnny and also Tokyo Dome's 25m moving stage was the longest in Johnny's history.

On June 27, KAT-TUN released its 18th single To The Limit, which was used as a tie-up song for Suzuki Solio Bandit CM. On June 29 Music Station reported that KAT-TUN ranked as No.10 best-selling Heisei era's idol with the total sales of 6,661,293 copies from 17 singles. In early August it was announced that KAT-TUN's Sekaiichi Dame Yoru Ni TV special will be turned into a regular show due to the success of the previous 2 special episodes. The regular show was renamed KAT-TUN Sekaiichi dame na yoru! and began airing on August 24 on TBS.

KAT-TUN's 19th single "Fumetsu no Scrum" which was used as the theme song for Kanjani8 member Yasuda Shota's drama Dragon Seinendan, was released on September 12 and sold around 157,000 copies within its first week of release, this gives KAT-TUN their 19th consecutive #1 single since their debut in 2006. In November, KAT-TUN achieved their 9th consecutive no.1 music-DVD, and 8th no.1 overall DVD with their live DVD, "KAT-TUN LIVE TOUR 2012 CHAIN TOKYO DOME." The latter achievement puts them at 3rd place among male groups who have done the most no.1 overall DVDs in history after B'z and Mr.Children.

=== 2013–2014: Tanaka Koki's departure and Come Here ===
"Expose" sold 155,000 copies in the first weeks. With this single, their number of consecutive singles topping the chart has reached 20. KAT-TUN is the second artist to top the singles chart for 20 consecutive singles since the debut. It was only achieved by their senior KinKi Kids 8 years and a month ago with “Anniversary”.

In October 2013, Koki Tanaka was removed from the band and the talent agency for having violated his contract, leaving KAT-TUN as a four-man ensemble.

The mini album "Kusabi" was released on November 27, 2013, on J-Storm. The title track "Kusabi" was used as the theme song for the drama Henshin Interviewer no Yūutsu starring KAT-TUN member Yuichi Nakamaru and actress Fumino Kimura, while "Gimme Luv" was used in a Suzuki Solio Bandit television commercial. "Kusabi" debuted at the number one spot top the Oricon weekly album chart, selling approximately 168,000 copies in its first week of release. The album is KAT-TUN's seventh consecutive album to achieve number one, putting them in a tie with singer Hikaru Utada for most consecutive album number ones in Oricon chart history.

"In Fact" was their 22nd single released on June 4, 2014, under the label J-One Records. The title track "In Fact" was the main theme song for the TV drama series "First Class". In Fact debuted at the number one spot top the Oricon weekly single chart, selling over 146,000 copies in its first week of release. With this, KAT-TUN achieved their 22nd consecutive No.1 with their 22nd single.

On June 25, "Come Here" album was released and KAT-TUN became the first artist in history to have 8 consecutive No.1 albums since debut according to Oricon.

=== 2015: Taguchi Junnosuke's departure ===
"Dead or Alive" was released on January 21, 2015, and it debuted at the number one spot on the Oricon weekly single chart, selling over 192,000 copies in its first week of release. With this, KAT-TUN has then achieved their 23rd consecutive No.1 with their 23rd single. They are currently behind KinKi Kids who are with 34 consecutive No.1 singles since debut. This album includes a new song written by Shikao Suga, named "Kimi no yume boku no yume", written as an answer song to KAT-TUN's song Real Face.

On November 24, 2015, before their performance at Best Artist, Junnosuke Taguchi surprised the audience by announcing that he had decided to quit not only KAT-TUN but also from Johnny's Entertainment and that he would retire from the industry by Spring the following year.

In the March 25, 2016, live broadcast of TV Asahi's Music Station and TBS's KAT-TUN no sekaiichi Tame ni naru tabi!, Taguchi had his last appearances as member of the group. On the Music Station show, the 4 members sang "Real Face". After it, Taguchi leaves, and the 3 remaining members sing a new song written by Shikao Suga, named "Kimi no yume boku no yume", which was written as an answer song to KAT-TUN's song Real Face. The song was to be included in their next album, "KAT-TUN 10th Anniversary BEST 10Ks".

=== 2016–2019: Hiatus, recharging period, Cast and Ignite ===
KAT-TUN released two more singles as a four-member group—"Tragedy" on February 10, 2016, followed by "Unlock" on March 2, 2016, both of which had reached number 1 in Oricon chart in their first week. A compilation album entitled "KAT-TUN 10th Anniversary BEST 10Ks" and a 3-Dome Tour entitled "KAT-TUN 10th Anniversary Live Tour 10Ks" were announced by the three remaining members through their official website. They also announced that the group activities of KAT-TUN will be on a temporary, indefinite hiatus (or so-called "recharging period") starting on May 1, 2016, as each member focused more on their solo projects and works. KAT-TUN 10th Anniversary Best "10Ks" album was then released on March 22, 2016 (the same date with their debut album released back in 2006) and has reached number 1 in the Oricon chart in its first week. On August 17, 2016, KAT-TUN released the DVD for KAT-TUN 10th Anniversary Live Tour "10Ks!” and it reached the number one spot in the Oricon Chart as well.

While the group activities are temporarily on hold, each member had their own individual projects, apart from the regular TV programs where they were regulars individually. All had been part or starred in different dramas, movies and theatrical plays and all three also had the chance to perform in a concert and stage shows.

On January 1, 2018, on the annual Johnny's Countdown, a big surprise had been announced and that KAT-TUN had finally resumed their group activities. The group sang their debut song, "Real Face", which was then followed by their song "Ask Yourself", the main theme song for Kamenashi's drama. After the performance, the group also announced that concert dates had been decided, which would be happening on April 20–22, 2018. The group later announced they would be releasing Cast on 18 July, their first original album in four years. On July 31, 2019, KAT-TUN released their ninth full album, Ignite.

=== 2021–2023: Resuming of group activities and Honey ===
In January 2021, NTV drama 'Red Eyes: Kanshi Sousa-han' premiered on January 23, starred Kamenashi. The title of the theme song was "Roar", and it's a song about one's determination to keep walking towards the future even though the present is ambiguous and has no correct answer. The single was released on March 10 as KAT-TUN's first single in three years. To commemorate the 15th anniversary of debut, KAT-TUN embarked on their nationwide tour '15th Anniversary Live KAT-TUN' on March 20 at Yoyogi National Stadium First Gymnasium (Tokyo), and wrapped up on June 9 at Marine Messe Fukuoka, 22 performances in 7 cities. Their live tour was later released through DVD and Blu-ray on November 24, which feature footage from the group's concert on May 29 at Pia Arena MM. On September 8, KAT-TUN announced double sided A-side single "We Just Go Hard" (featuring AK-69), the single was the image song for NTV's broadcast of professional baseball Dramatic Baseball 2021 as well as the theme song for NTV's 'Going! Sports & News'. Meanwhile, "Euphoria" as the theme song for Bishounen's drama The High School Heroes that premiered on July 31.

In February 2022, KAT-TUN announced the release of their digital single "Crystal Moment", as the theme song for NTV's coverage of the Beijing 2022 Winter Olympics, the rap lyrics were written by Arashi's Sho Sakurai.

For the first time in about two and a half years, KAT-TUN announced the release of the 10th full album Honey. Two songs, "Ain't Seen Nothing Yet" and "Sting", are the lead songs, with the album released on March 29. They also held "KAT-TUN Live Tour 2022 Honey" from April 1 to June 4, via eight locations.

On February 15, 2023, “Fantasia” album was released following KAT-TUN's "Honey" released in March 2022. "With the theme of "genreless", it is a work that collects songs of various genres. Contains 15 songs including DIRTY LUV, Wild Rose, Love Lots Together, and others.

=== 2024: Nakamaru's activities suspension ===
On August 7, 2024, Shūkan Bunshun reported that Nakamaru had secretly met with a 20-year-old college student at a hotel. Nakamaru responded with an apology "to all concerned", through his agency, which also posted a comment regarding his "lack of awareness and responsibility". As a consequence, of his own volition, he would refrain from all activities for an undisclosed period of time, Nakamaru resumed activities with the group the following January.

=== 2025: Disbandment and "Break the KAT-TUN" concert ===
In early February 2025 it was reported that Kamenashi had considered leaving KAT-TUN and Starto. On February 12, Starto announced that KAT-TUN would disband and that Kamenashi would leave the agency upon the expiration of Kamenashi's contract on March 31. Nakamaru and Ueda would remain with Starto under individual contracts. The three members were considering making arrangements to create a place where they can meet the fans in the near future, according to the wishes of the members.

On March 31, the group held a livestream event, with the three appearing in the studio where the music video of their debut song "Real Face" was filmed. With tears in their eyes, the members reminisced on their difficult story together. In August, a farewell concert was announced, Break the KAT-TUN, a live performance, to be held at ZOZO Marine Stadium in Chiba Prefecture on November 8th. Only one venue performance was announced. Former members Junnosuke Taguchi and Jin Akanishi reacted to the performance. Taguchi thanked the group, posting on his X that he wasn't able to see them live, but humorously used the name of the concert as "Break the ATA-MA" because of him having a fever and a headache since the day before. As for Akanishi, he shared on his Instagram photos inside of the venue, as well as backstage with himself and his former co-members.

=== 2026: Post disbandment ===
On March 22, 2026, what would have been its 20th anniversary, it was announced that the group would be releasing its discography on streaming sites. From KAT-TUN's debut song "Real Face" (released on March 22, 2006) to their last album "Fantasia" (released on February 15, 2023), a total of 29 singles and 13 albums were released, with 273 songs added to already released songs, for a total of 312 songs.

== Past Members ==
- Kazuya Kamenashi (亀梨 和也, Kamenashi Kazuya) (born February 23, 1986), (Main Vocals) (2001 - 2025)
- Jin Akanishi (赤西 仁, Akanishi Jin) (born July 4, 1984), (Main Vocals) (2001 - 2010)
- Junnosuke Taguchi (田口 淳之介, Taguchi Junnosuke) (born November 29, 1985), (Sub Vocals) (2001 - 2015)
- Koki Tanaka (田中 聖, Tanaka Kōki) (born November 5, 1985), (Rapper, Sub Vocals) (2001 - 2014)
- Tatsuya Ueda (上田 竜也, Ueda Tatsuya) (born October 4, 1983), (Sub Vocals) (2001 - 2025)
- Yuichi Nakamaru (中丸 雄一, Nakamaru Yuichi) (born September 4, 1983), (Sub Vocals) (2001 - 2025)

== Discography ==
- Best of KAT-TUN (2006)
- Cartoon KAT-TUN II You (2007)
- KAT-TUN III: Queen of Pirates (2008)
- Break the Records: By You & for You (2009)
- No More Pain (2010)
- Chain (2012)
- Come Here (2014)
- CAST (2018)
- IGNITE (2019)
- Honey (2022)
- Fantasia (2023)

== Other activities ==
=== TV shows ===
KAT-TUN had regularly appeared on NHK's Johnny's Jr. show Shounen Club and became the regular hosts and leaders of the show until 2006 when they made their official debut. They also became part of other variety programs like Minna no Terebi and KAT-TUNx3. KAT-TUN even became special supporters for the FIVB World Grand Champions Cup in 2005, wherein their song "Gloria" served as its theme song.

From 2005 to January 2007, KAT-TUN was a regular participant in the variety show Utawara Hot Hit 10 with Jun Matsumoto. From October 8, 2006, members Tanaka Koki & Nakamaru Yuichi hosted the show YouTachi! YOUたち! together, until the show ended on September 30, 2007.

From April 4, 2007, KAT-TUN then began hosting their own talk show Cartoon KAT-TUN every Wednesday until March 24, 2010, comprising a total of 152 episodes. This was their last regular show as a 6-member group.

After becoming a 5-member group, their next TV show titled KAT-TUN no Zettai Manetaku Naru TV began on October 18, 2011, on NTV and lasted only for a total of 10 episodes, with the show's finale on December 20, 2011.

KAT-TUN then also had a one-off TV special titled KAT-TUN no Sekaiichi Dame Yoru Ni which was aired on the night of January 1, 2012, on TBS. It was soon followed by another special episode on April 3, 2012. Following the success of the two special episodes of the show, it became KAT-TUN's third regular TV show. The show was then renamed as KAT-TUN Sekaiichi Dame na Yoru! and began airing from August 24, 2012, until December 28, 2012.

On January 11, 2014, after becoming a four-man group, KAT-TUN became guests for a special program titled KAT-TUN Sekaiichi Tame ni Naru Tabi where they traveled to Okinawa (for two episodes), Aomori, Hokkaido and Kumamoto. The 5-part special became a success that the show was soon confirmed to become another regular show for KAT-TUN, retaining the same title of the program. The first episode aired on April 17, 2015, and lasted until the 42nd episode on March 25, 2016.

In 2014, KAT-TUN also became the main hosts for the Shounen Club Premium, replacing Taichi Kokubun from TOKIO. Their stint as the show's main hosts started from April 2014 until March 2016. Another Johnny's group NEWS then replaced them as the hosts of the show.

In 2021, the program "Nani suru KAT-TUN" started during the 15th anniversary celebrations, with Nakamaru, Ueda and Kamenashi. The program ended in 2025, due to KAT-TUN's disbanding. The last episode featured only Ueda and Kamenashi, with a stuffed animal taking the place for Nakamaru. Ueda commented: "This program started on our 15th anniversary, and I never thought it would continue for four years. The members are quite eccentric, but we were able to take on the challenge with your warm support". Kamenashi's comment: "I'm truly grateful from the bottom of my heart for being given this environment and being able to get together every month and talk. From now on, the members will spend time together. I hope to continue to do my best". With images since the first episode and a collage of memories, the program ended with the members walking off stage with the "Nakamaru" stuffed animal.

=== Radio ===
The group has had three different radio shows, each hosted by different members and all have aired for several years.

Former members Jin Akanishi, Koki Tanaka and Junnosuke Taguchi hosted KAT-TUN Style together from April 2006 until March 2012. Yuichi Nakamaru and Tatsuya Ueda hosted R-One KAT-TUN every Tuesday from 12 am – 12:30 am.

Kazuya Kamenashi had his own radio show called Kamenashi Kazuya - Kase by Kase until it ended on September 20. He has a new radio show called Kamenashi Kazuya - Hang Out and currently airs every Saturday from 10:20 am – 10:50 am.

Taguchi Junnosuke also had his own radio show called "Tag-tune driving" and a radio show together with Yuichi Nakamaru called "KAT-TUN no Gatsūn" from April 2012 and ended in March 2016.

=== Musicals ===
As a group, KAT-TUN has appeared in Koichi Domoto's Shock musical, Summary of Johnnys World with NEWS and Ya-ya-yah and Johnny's long-running Dream Boys musicals from 2004 to 2006.

Since 2004, member Kazuya Kamenashi has played the lead role in Dream Boys musicals consecutively each year, after senior Hideaki Takizawa handed down the role to Kamenashi. Kamenashi and fellow KAT-TUN member Koki Tanaka paired up to play the lead roles for the shows held in 2007 and 2008. The pair collaborated once again as the leads for the 2011 shows alongside fellow KAT-TUN member Yuichi Nakamaru. The 2012 shows for the musical began in September, and once again Kamenashi reprised his role as the lead for the musical.

=== Concerts ===
KAT-TUN regularly held concerts in Japan since their first concert in 2002, helping them to gain popularity. It was considered remarkable for a Johnny's group which had not yet officially debuted.

KAT-TUN was the first Japanese artist to perform for four days in a row at Tokyo Dome during their Queen of Pirates tour. The following year, they broke their own record becoming the first artists ever to perform for eight consecutive days at Tokyo Dome during their Break The Records: By You & For You 2009 tour. Now, Johnny & Associates submitted this new record to Guinness Book of World Records for KAT-TUN to be recognized as the Japanese boy band who broke the records in Tokyo Dome performances.

The group (excluding Jin Akanishi) held their biggest concert tour in 2010 titled KAT-TUN -NO MORE PAIИ- WORLD TOUR 2010 which consisted of concerts in major cities across Japan. The tour also included concerts held in Taiwan and Korea; the first time the group had toured outside Japan for their official concerts. Although during their pre-debut years, KAT-TUN had on several occasions toured overseas with their senior groups, while they were still Johnny Jrs.

Their nationwide tour for 2012 titled KAT-TUN LIVE TOUR 2012 CHAIN began in Nagiita on Feb 11, they toured 12 cities across Japan including Sendai; one of the worst affected areas by the Tohoku earthquake & tsunami disaster back in March 2011.

=== Commercials ===
KAT-TUN regularly appeared in TV commercials to endorse for NTT docomo, SKY PerfecTV!, Rohto and Lotte from 2005 to 2009.

Since 2010, member Kazuya Kamenashi endorses Panasonic's Lamdash shaver and DOLTZ electric toothbrush, and AOKI 3D slim suits. Kamenashi also endorses KIRIN's 'Gogo no Kocha' tea since March 2012, and is endorsing SOURS Gummies since early 2013.

Since early 2011, the group together has endorsed Suzuki's 'SOLIO' car, and has sung commercial theme songs for Sofina and Wing products. The group are also currently endorsing the mobile game site entag!.

=== Events ===
On August 26–27, 2006 KAT-TUN members were the main personality supporters for the NTV telethon 24 Hour Television: Love Saves the Earth charity program.

== Awards ==
Years	Awards
2006	Japan Gold Disc Awards: Music Video Of The Year - KAT-TUN Live Kaizokuban
2007	Japan Gold Disc Awards: Single Of The Year - "Real Face"; Japan Gold Disc Awards: The Best 10 Singles - "Real Face"; Japan Gold Disc Awards: The Best 10 Singles - "Signal"; Japan Gold Disc Awards: The Best 10 Singles - "Bokura no Machi de"; Japan Gold Disc Awards: The Best 10 Albums - Best of KAT-TUN; Japan Gold Disc Awards: The Best Music Videos - Real Face Film
2008	Japan Gold Disc Awards: The Best 10 Singles - "Keep the Faith"; Japan Gold Disc Awards: The Best 10 Singles - "Yorokobi No Uta"; Japan Gold Disc Awards: The Best Music Videos - Live of KAT-TUN "Real Face"; The 17th TV Life Annual Drama Awards: Best Theme Song - "Keep the Faith"
2009	Japan Gold Disc Awards: The Best 10 Singles - "Lips"; Japan Gold Disc Awards: The Best 10 Singles - "Don't U Ever Stop"
2010	Japan Gold Disc Awards: The Best 5 Singles - "Rescue"
