= Jin Akanishi discography =

- Studio albums: 8
- EPs: 2
- Singles: 8
- Video albums: 3

The discography of Japanese recording artist Jin Akanishi.

== Studio albums ==
List of albums, with selected chart positions
Title	Album details	Peak positions				Sales	Certifications
Title	Album details	JPN	TWN	TWN East Asian (Note: Position were taken as follows: "Bandage" 2009 week 48, Olympos 2010 week 13, "Eternal" 2011 week 49, Yellow Gold Tour 3011 2011 week 51, Test Drive 2011 week 51, "Seasons" 2012 week 7 Japonicana 2012 week 11.)	US Dance	Sales	Certifications
Olympos	Released as Lands, a collaborative unit with Takeshi Kobayashi; Released: January 13, 2010 (JPN); Label: J Storm; Formats: CD	1	12	5	—	JPN: 143,000	RIAJ: Gold
Japonicana	Released: March 6, 2012 (US); Label: Warner; Formats: CD, digital download	2	—	— (Note: Charted at number 9 on the Western chart.)	10	JPN: 80,000	RIAJ: Gold
#JustJin	Released: November 6, 2013 (JPN); Label: Warner; Formats: 2CD, digital download	3	—	—	—	JPN: 47,000	
Me	Released: June 24, 2015 (JPN); Label: Go Good Records; Formats: CD, CD/DVD, digital download	3	—	—	—	JPN: 38,000	
Audio Fashion	Released: June 22, 2016 (JPN); Label: Go Good Records; Formats: CD, CD/DVD, digital download	2	–	–	–	JPN: 35,000	
Blessèd	Released: December 12, 2017 (JPN); Label: Go Good Records; Formats: CD, CD/DVD, digital download	4	—	— (Note: Charted at number 9 on the Western chart.)	—	JPN: 33,282	
Thank You	Released: May 15, 2019; Label: Go Good Records; Formats: CD, digital download	2	—	—	—	JPN: 20,280	
Yellow Note	Released: December 27, 2023; Label: Go Good Records; Formats: CD, digital download	1	—	—	—		
"—" denotes items that did not chart or were not released in that territory.

== Compilation and other albums ==
List of albums, with selected chart positions
Title	Album details	Peak positions				Sales	Certifications
Title	Album details	JPN	TWN	TWN East Asian	US	Sales	Certifications
À la carte (rearranged album)	Released: August 1, 2018; Label: Emi Records; Formats: CD, CD+DVD, CD+BluRay, digital; Normal, Limited edition, and Universal Music exclusive edition CD+DVD and CD+BluRay	—	—	—	—		
Our best	Released: April 22, 2020; Label: Go Good Records; Formats: CD, CD+DVD, CD+BluRay, digital; Normal, Limited edition type A and type B	—	—	—	—		
"—" denotes items that did not chart or were not released in that territory.

== Extended plays ==
List of extended plays, with selected chart positions
Title	Album details	Peak positions			Sales	Certifications
Title	Album details	JPN	TWN	TWN East Asian	Sales	Certifications
Test Drive	Released: December 7, 2011 (JPN); Label: Warner; Formats: CD, digital download	1	16	3	JPN: 123,000	RIAJ: Gold
Mi Amor	Released: November 12, 2014 (JPN); Label: Go Good Records; Formats: CD, digital download	3	—	—	JPN: 38,000	
"—" denotes items that did not chart or were not released in that territory.

== Singles ==
List of singles, with selected chart positions
Title	Year	Peak chart positions					Sales	Certifications	Album
Title	Year	JPN Oricon	JPN Hot 100 (Note: Sources for chart positions are as follows: "Bandage", "Genki", "Eternal", "Test Drive", "Seasons", "Sun Burns Down", "Hey What's Up?", "Ai Naru Hō e", "Good Time".)	TWN	TWN East Asian	US Dance Club Songs	Sales	Certifications	Album
"Bandage" (as Lands)	2009	1	1	—	4	—	JPN: 257,000	RIAJ (physical): Platinum	Olympos
"Eternal"	2011	1	1	20	4	—	JPN: 242,000	RIAJ (physical): Platinum	#JustJin
"Test Drive" (featuring Jason Derülo)	2011	—	16	—	—	48			Japonicana
"Seasons"	2011	1	24	—	3	—	JPN: 114,000	RIAJ (physical): Gold	#JustJin
"Sun Burns Down"	2012	—	23	—	—	35			Japonicana
"Hey What's Up?"	2013	2	2	—	—	—	JPN: 127,000	RIAJ (physical): Gold	#JustJin
"Ai Naru Hō e" (アイナルホウエ; "To Where Love Rings")	2013	3	4	—	—	—	JPN: 49,000		#JustJin
"Good Time"	2014	2	8	—	—	—	JPN: 45,000		Me
"Choo choo shitain" (with Takayuki Yamada, as Jintaka)	2016								
"—" denotes items that did not chart or were not released in that territory or did not chart.

=== Promotional singles ===
Title	Year	Peak chart positions	Album
Title	Year	JPN Hot 100	Album
"Genki" (元気; "Happy")	2010	57	Olympos
"Mi Amor"	2014	—	Mi Amor / Me
"Let Me Talk to U"	2015	—	Me

=== Other charted songs ===
Title	Year	Peak chart positions	Album
Title	Year	JPN RIAJ Digital Track Chart (Note: The RIAJ Digital Track Chart is a depreciated chart that ran from 2009 until early 2012 and tracked full-length cellphone downloads.) (Note: Sources for chart positions are as follows: "Tipsy Love", "My MP3".)	Album
"Tipsy Love"	2011	50	Test Drive
"My MP3"	2011	55	Test Drive

== Video albums ==
List of media, with selected chart positions
Title	Album details	Peak positions			Certifications
Title	Album details	JPN DVD	JPN Blu-ray	TWN	Certifications
Yellow Gold Tour 3011	Released: May 4, 2011 (JPN); Label: Warner; Formats: DVD	1	—	2	RIAJ: Gold
Jin Akanishi Japonicana Tour 2012 in USA	Released: September 25, 2013 (JPN); Label: Warner; Formats: DVD, Blu-ray	8	19	—	
Jin Akanishi’s Club Circuit Tour	Released: April 2, 2014 (JPN); Label: Warner; Formats: DVD, Blu-ray	4	7	—	
"—" denotes items that did not chart or were not released in that territory or did not chart.

== Other appearances ==
The following songs are recordings crediting Jin Akanishi as a soloist, that and have not appeared on a release by him.

Title	Year	Other artists	Album
"Lovejuice"	2008		"Don't U Ever Stop" (single)
"Care"	2009		Break the Records: By You & for You
"Helpless Night"	2009	Crystal Kay	Best of Crystal Kay
"A Page"	2010		"Love Yourself (Kimi ga Kirai na Kimi ga Suki)" (single)
