= Bandage (disambiguation) =

A bandage is a medical treatment.

Bandage or Bandages may also refer to:

- Adhesive bandage, a bandage used to stick on the skin
- Bandage (film), a 2010 Japanese film
- "Bandage" (song) a song by Lands
- Bandages (album), by the Edgar Broughton Band
- "Bandages" (song), by Hot Hot Heat
