= Test Drive (EP) =

EP by Jin Akanishi featuring Jason Derulo
- Released: November 8, 2011
- Recorded: 2011
- Genre: Pop; dance
- Length: 22:57 (CD)
- Label: Warner Music Japan

Jin Akanishi chronology
Test Drive (2011)	Japonicana (2012)

Jason Derulo singles chronology
"Breathing" (2011)	"Test Drive" (2011)	"Fight for You" (2011)

"Test Drive" is the extended play (EP) by Japanese singer and former KAT-TUN member Jin Akanishi, serving as his debut single in the United States. The EP which features American singer Jason Derulo was released digitally to the American market on November 8, 2011, while on December 7, 2011 was released physically in Japan where it topped the Oricon and Billboard album charts.

== Background ==
In February 2010 Akanishi held over 30 concerts titled "You & Jin" in Japan, while in June had 3 sold-out shows at Club Nokia in Los Angeles. In July was announced that he would permanently leave the group KAT-TUN, becoming the first solo artist of Johnny & Associates to perform in the United States. In November was held tour "Yellow Gold Tour 3010", named after the tour's title song "Yellow Gold", and the venues included were Rosemont Theatre in Rosemont, The Warfield in San Francisco, House of Blues in Houston, Club Nokia in Los Angeles, and MTV Iggy Studio and Best Buy Theater in New York City. After signing a global deal with Warner Music Group in December 2010, on March 2, 2011 in Japan was released his first single "Eternal".

== Release ==
The extended play was released as "Test Drive (Remixes) feat. Jason Derulo" on November 8, 2011 through all major digital music stores, serving as his US debut single. As "Test Drive featuring Jason Derulo" or simply "Test Drive", was released in Japan on December 7, in standard and limited edition, both featuring three versions of the title track, plus the songs "My MP3" and "Paparats". The standard edition features also a bouns track "Tipsy Love", while limited instead a DVD with making-of and music video.

To promote the record were held a number of promotional events on the 8th of November, including a Ustream Q&A session, followed by a single release party at the Beverly Center, attended by 300 fans. It was followed on December 28 by his second physical single release in Japan, "Seasons". Later on January 6, 2012, was held a sold-out concert at 12,000 seat Yokohama Arena, which live was streamed at the Grammy Museum.

== Track listing ==
All tracks are written by J. R. Rotem, Jason Derulo, Jin Akanishi.

U.S. Digital EP
No.	Title	Length
1.	"Test Drive" (7th Heaven Mix)	3:38
2.	"Test Drive" (Main Mix)	3:20
3.	"Test Drive" (Funkystepz Mix)	4:11
4.	"Test Drive" (Static Revenger Dub)	5:37
Total length:		16:44

Japanese Standard Edition CD
No.	Title	Length
1.	"Test Drive featuring Jason Derulo" (7th Heaven Mix)	3:39
2.	"Test Drive featuring Jason Derulo" (Main Mix)	3:20
3.	"Test Drive featuring Jason Derulo" (Static Revenger Mix Show Edit)	4:50
4.	"My MP3"	3:28
5.	"Paparats"	3:58
6.	"Tipsy Love"	3:44
Total length:		22:57

Japanese Limited Edition CD
No.	Title	Length
1.	"Test Drive featuring Jason Derulo" (7th Heaven Mix)	3:39
2.	"Test Drive featuring Jason Derulo" (Main Mix)	3:20
3.	"Test Drive featuring Jason Derulo" (Funkystepz Mix)	4:11
4.	"My MP3"	3:28
5.	"Paparats"	3:58
Total length:		18:32

Japanese Limited Edition DVD
No.	Title	Length
1.	"Test Drive featuring Jason Derulo" (Music Video)
2.	"Test Drive featuring Jason Derulo" (Making of the Music Video)

== Charts and certifications ==
The release charted in both single, and as far as the sales are concerned, most albums charts. The digital EP reached the number one spot on iTunes Dance album charts, and tenth spot on the overall Albums chart. On the Billboard charts, it peaked at number one on Hot Singles Sales, number two on Dance Singles Sales, and number eleven for five weeks on Hot Dance Club Songs.

In Japan has reached number sixteen on the Billboards Japan Hot 100 and debuted at number one on the Top Album chart. It has debuted on the Oricon's weekly album charts at number one, selling nearly 109,000 copies in its first week of release, and charted for seven weeks. It was the best performance by a Japanese artist's foreign album release since Hikaru Utada released Exodus in 2004. It was the 55th best-selling album of the year in Japan, and was certified Gold by RIAJ.

Chart (2010–11)	Peak position
Oricon Weekly Albums	1
Billboard Japan Top Albums	1
Billboard Japan Hot 100	16
Billboard U.S. Hot Dance Club Songs	11
Billboard Hot Singles Sales	1
Billboard Dance Singles Sales	2
