= Shibamoto =

Shibamoto (written: 芝本 or 柴本) is a Japanese surname. Notable people with the surname include:

- Ren Shibamoto (芝本 蓮, born 1999), Japanese footballer
- Yuki Shibamoto (柴本 幸, born 1983), Japanese actress
