= Fantastipo (song) =

Single by Toraji Haiji
- Language: Japanese
- Released: January 26, 2005
- Genre: Pop; disco
- Length: 15:42
- Label: Johnny's Entertainment
- Songwriter(s): Yōji Kubota; Akio Shimizu; Chokkaku

"Fantastipo" (ファンタスティポ) is a song recorded by Japanese idol unit Toraji Haiji for the film Fantastipo, which stars the Toraji Haiji members. It was released on January 26, 2005. It is their first and only single. The song was written by Yōji Kubota and Akio Shimizu, and arranged by Chokkaku. "Fantastipo" is a 70's mirror ball disco number with a steady kayōkyoku melody.

Toraji Haiji performed the song for the first time on television on Music Station on January 21, 2005. The following week they performed on Hey! Hey! Hey! Music Champ and Utaban.

"Fantastipo" was a commercial hit, selling over 200,000 copies in its first week, and debuting at number one on the Oricon Singles Chart. It charted for 25 weeks. In February 2005, the single was certified for Platinum by the Recording Industry Association of Japan for shipments of over 250,000 copies. "Fantastipo" sold over 420,000 copies by the end of the year and was the 9th best-selling single of 2005.

== Track listing ==
No.	Title	Lyrics	Music	Arrangement	Length
1.	"Chit-chat" (オシャベリ Oshaberi)				7:05
2.	"Fantastipo" (ファンタスティポ)	Yōji Kubota	Akio Shimizu	Chokkaku	4:19
3.	"Fantastipo (instrumental)"				4:18
Total length:					15:42

Limited edition – DVD
No.	Title	Length
1.	"Fantastipo music video"
2.	"How to Dance" (Choreography video)

== Credits and personnel ==
- Toraji Koinobori (Taichi Kokubun) – Vocals
- Haiji Koinobori (Tsuyoshi Domoto) – Vocals
- Chokkaku – Music programming, keyboards, guitar
- Takeshi Taneda – Bass guitar
- Rush by Takashi Kato – Strings
- Masayuki Iwata – Chorus
- Yukako Ichiki – Chorus
