= Hey What's Up? =

Single by Jin Akanishi

from the album #JustJin
- B-side: "Key To Your Heart"
- Released: August 7, 2013
- Recorded: 2013
- Genre: Pop
- Length: 4:33
- Label: Warner Music Japan
- Songwriters: Jin Akanishi, Zen Nishizawa

Jin Akanishi singles chronology
"Sun Burns Down" (2012)	"Hey What's Up?" (2013)	"Ai Naru Hō e" (2013)

"Hey What's Up?" is the third physical solo single by Japanese singer-songwriter Jin Akanishi, released on August 7, 2013.

== Background ==
In 2013 "Hey What's Up?" was chosen as the first official theme song for the Tokyo Girls Collection fashion show, which was held on the 31st of that same month at the Saitama Super Arena. In October was released the fifth single "Ai Naru Hō e" (To Where Love Rings), and in November his second studio album #JustJin.

== Release ==
The single was released in two different editions, the standard or regular edition, which opposite of the limited edition's only b-side song "Key To Your Heart", it additionally includes the song "Summer Loving". There three different limited editions; the edition A includes a DVD featuring the title track’s music video as well as its making-of video, edition B a DVD documenting the single's recording and jacket photo session, while the edition C is CD-only (not standard) and features a 24-page photo booklet. There are three different cover artworks for the limited edition.

Akanishi commented about the title track, "Since the theme is "summer party", I absolutely wanted to put in a party scene. I wanted to present the amusement of Japan".

== Chart performance ==
The single was released on August 7, 2013 by Warner Music Japan, approximately a year and a half following his American debut studio album Japonicana.

In the first week it debuted at number two on Oricon weekly singles chart. It stayed on the charts for nine weeks, and with 127,000 copies sold it was the 52nd best-selling single of the year, and was certified Gold by RIAJ denoting over 100,000 shipments.

It has peaked at number two on the Billboards Japan Hot 100, and the Hot Singles Sales chart. It also peaked at number thirteen on Hot Top Airplay, and number eighteen on Adult Contemporary Airplay.

== Track listing ==
All lyrics are written by Jin Akanishi; all music is composed by Jin Akanishi, Zen Nishizawa.

Standard Edition
No.	Title	Length
1.	"Hey What's Up?"	4:33
2.	"Key To Your Heart -Kimi no Kokoro no Kagi-" (～君のココロの鍵～)	3:33
3.	"Summer Loving"	3:46
4.	"Hey What's Up?" (Instrumental)	4:33
5.	"Key To Your Heart -Kimi no Kokoro no Kagi-" (Instrumental)	3:33
6.	"Summer Loving" (Instrumental)	3:46

== Charts ==
Charts (2013)	Peak position
Oricon Weekly Singles	2
Billboard Japan Hot 100	2
Billboard Japan Adult Contemporary Airplay	18
