= Ninja (group) =

Japanese boy band

Ninja (忍者)
- Also known as: Shounen Ninja, Yonjuushi
- Origin: Japan
- Genres: J-Pop, Enka
- Years active: 1990–1996
- Labels: Nippon Columbia
- Past members: Susumu Yanagisawa; Yasunobu Shiga; Naoto Endo; Koyo MaedaShinya Masaki; Nobuhide Takagi; Eiji Furukawa

Ninja (忍者, Ninja) was a Japanese idol group managed by Japanese talent agency Johnny & Associates from 1990 to 1997. They were well known for their acrobatic stage performances and remaking Hibari Misora's songs during their debut years.

== History ==
Before their debut in 1985, they were active under stage name Shounen Ninja (少年忍者), who were active as back-dancers to the Shonentai in their television stage performances and in their musical series Playzone. In early 1988, two years before major debut, they made their first stage performances along with Otokogumi and Shonentai together as "Gosanke (少年御三家)" on Nippon Budokan.

In August 1990, they made music major debut with the single "Omatsuri Ninja" released under Nippon Columbia label. It is partial remake of the Hibari Misora's single Matsuri Manbo released back in 1952. Although the single debuted at number three during its first week of release, by the end of year it had received an awards from the category "Best New Artist" on the 32nd Japan Record Awards, on the 21st Japan Music Awards and on the 19th FNS Music Festival. On the same year, they made their first television appearance on the national end-year program Kōhaku Uta Gassen. In 1991, with the release of the fourth single "Himiko", they started to release original songs as a group. In 1993, Shiga and Furukawa left group and released together as 6-member their final single "Harapeko". In 1994, they've releases single Do Your Best under alias stage name Yonjuushi (四銃士). In 1995, they've released cover single Money Magic, originally performed by Godiego, initialing became their first cover single for the first time in since 1991. In 1996, they've released final single "Tatoe Kimi ga Usotsuitemo", which did not chart on the Oricon Weekly Charts. With the released of the final studio album Hi La Ri, they've completely disappeared from the music scene, without public statement about hiatus or band disband.

In 2023, Shiga has confessed to the public for the first time for being the victim of the Johnny Kitagawa sexual abuse scandal. He is active as a member of the Johnny's Association for Sexual Assault Issues.

== Former members ==
=== Ninja ===
- Susumu Yanagisawa (柳沢(やなぎさわ) 超(すすむ), Yanagisawa Susumu; born March 7, 1967): leader
- Yasunobu Shiga (志賀(しが) 泰伸(やすのぶ), Shiga Yasunobu; born August 3, 1968)
  - left the group in 1994
- Naoto Endo (遠藤(えんどう) 直人(なおと), Endou Naoto; born April 20, 1969)
- Shinya Masaki (正木(まさき) 慎也(しんや), Masaki Shinya; born May 29, 1969)
- Nobuhide Takagi (高木(たかぎ) 延秀(のぶひで), Takagi Nobuhide; born March 11, 1970)
- Eiji Furukawa (古川(ふるかわ) 栄司(えいじ), Furukawa Eiji; born July 11, 1971)
  - left the group in 1994

=== Shounen Ninja ===
- Nobutoshi Nakamura (中村(なかむら) 亘利(のぶとし), Nakamura Nobutoshi; born February 9, 1970)
  - was part of the Shounen Ninja, however due to his actives with the group Cha-Cha, he left the Ninja before group change name and major debut.

== Discography ==
=== Singles ===
Year	Album	Chart positions (JP)	Label
1990	"Omatsuri Ninja" (お祭り忍者)	3	Nippon Columbia
1991	"Ringo Hakusho" (リンゴ白書)	9	Nippon Columbia
1991	"O-i! Kurumayasan" (おーぃ！車屋さん)	11	Nippon Columbia
1991	"Himiko" (秘・美・子)	17	Nippon Columbia
1992	"Kimi ni Want You" (君に御中)	21	Nippon Columbia
1992	"Harassho" (ハラショ!)	20	Nippon Columbia
1992	"Naminda Naminda no Karaoke Box" (涙 涙のカラオケボックス)	49	Nippon Columbia
1993	"Nihon" (日本)	48	Nippon Columbia
1993	"Nihon Bugi" (日本ブギ)	37	Nippon Columbia
1993	"Harapeko"	57	Nippon Columbia
1994	"Do Your Best"	59	Nippon Columbia
1995	"Monkey Magic" (モンキー・マジック)	69	Nippon Columbia
1995	"Tatoe Kimi ga Uso wo Tsuitemi" (たとえ君が嘘をついても)	-	Nippon Columbia

==== Video singles ====
Year	Album	Chart positions (JP)	Label
1990	"Omatsuri Ninja/Burai" (お祭り忍者/無頼)	3	Nippon Columbia
1991	"Ringo Hakusho/Kiri no Persona" (リンゴ白書/霧の仮面（ペルソナ）)	9	Nippon Columbia
1991	"O-i! Kurumayasan/Heysay Boogie" (おーぃ！車屋さん/ヘイセイ・ブギー)	11	Nippon Columbia
1991	"Himiko/Replay" (秘・美・子/リプレイ)	17	Nippon Columbia

=== Albums ===
==== Studio albums ====
Title	Album details	Peak chart positions
Title	Album details	JPN Oricon
Ninja (忍者)	Released: 1990.10.2; Label: Nippon Columbia; Formats: CD, Cassette tape	-
Ninja Hakusho (NINJA白書)	Released: 1991.3.21; Label: Nippon Columbia; Formats: CD	11
Summer Fiesta	Released: 1991.8.1; Label: Nippon Columbia; Formats: CD	-
Ninja San Jou (忍者参上)	Released: 1991.12.21; Label: Nippon Columbia; Formats: CD	-
Maitta (まいった)	Released: 1992.7.10; Label: Nippon Columbia; Formats: CD	-
Summer Ski	Released: 1993.4.1; Label: Nippon Columbia; Formats: CD	-
Nihon Ichi (日本一)	Released: 1993.7.21; Label: Nippon Columbia; Formats: CD	-
Hi La Ri	Released: 1996.1.20; Label: Nippon Columbia; Formats: CD	-

==== Compilation albums ====
Title	Album details	Peak chart positions
Title	Album details	JPN Oricon
Do Our Best	Released: 1994.12.21; Label: Nippon Columbia; Formats: CD	-

== Videography ==
	Release	Title
1	1991.10.1	Summer Fiesta Ninja Live
2	1991.10.1	Summer Fiesta Ninja Documentary
3	1992.10.1	On & Off
4	1993.3.1	Fuyu no Jin '93
5	1993.12.1	Ninja Kenmonroku
