= Mi Amor (Jin Akanishi EP) =

EP by Jin Akanishi
- Released: November 12, 2014
- Recorded: 2014
- Genre: Pop, dance, contemporary R&B
- Length: 26:58
- Label: Go Good Records
- Producer: Jin Akanishi

Jin Akanishi chronology
| #JustJin (2013) | Mi Amor (2014) |

Mi Amor is the second extended play by Japanese singer-songwriter Jin Akanishi. It was released on November 12, 2014, by his newly founded independent record label Go Good Records. The title song is a blend of EDM and pop music.

== Background ==
On March 2, 2014, it was announced that Akanishi had decided not to renew his contract with Johnny & Associates, and had left the agency as of February 28. On July 4, it was announced that he had set up his own independent label, Go Good Records, and had opened his new fan club, "JIP's" (Jin's Important People).

On August 6, under Go Good Records, Akanishi re-debuted with his fifth physical single "Good Time". The single was also made available on the iTunes Store across the globe.

== Release ==
The EP was released in two different editions, standard and limited. The physical CD standard edition comes with the bonus track "Replay". The limited edition, like the digitally released EP at the iTunes Store, contains only six songs, and also includes a DVD featuring the title track's music video as well as its making-of video. The limited edition B includes documentary footage of Shanghai West Bund Music Festival where Akanishi performed in September 2014, and a "Good Time" special event.

The title song in Spanish language means "My Love". He wrote the lyrics to title song after composing the music, and commented about the title track, "Words such as conflict, love, shooting star, and wish came to mind, and it became a natural and abstract love song. In this song, there are no lyrics in the hook. It's unusual in J-pop where feelings are expressed through the track itself. It's a song that fuses EDM and POP in a new approach".

Akanishi himself worked on the music video production. The video features a shirtless Akanishi showing his tattoos and playing a guitar that emits laser beams. He said, "I felt that it was necessary to incorporate one thing with impact in the Music Video. As a result of thinking about the song's theme and other things associated with the track, a contradictory guitar came to mind. Then, thinking about the contradictory guitar, I decided to make an original laser guitar that combines a retro acoustic guitar and a futuristic laser beam".

== Touring ==
On November 11 Akanishi went on a nationwide "Jindependence" tour from Zepp Sapporo, which ended on December 2 at Zepp Tokyo, with a total of 11 shows in 5 cities.

== Chart performance ==
The album debuted on the Oricon's weekly album charts at number three, selling 35,022 copies in its first week of release, and charted for four weeks. On Billboard's Japan Top Albums chart, it peaked at number three. It peaked at number four on Billboard's Japan Top Independent Albums and Singles chart, while on the Oricon Indies Albums chart it peaked at number one. It was the top-selling indie album of the year.

== Track listing ==
All tracks are written by Jin Akanishi, Zen Nishizawa, Dominic Pierson

Standard edition
| No. | Title | Length |
|---|---|---|
| 1. | "Mi Amor" | 4:19 |
| 2. | "Baila" | 3:27 |
| 3. | "Baby Girl" | 4:18 |
| 4. | "Lucky" | 3:50 |
| 5. | "Anything You Want" | 3:33 |
| 6. | "Replay" (Standard bonus track) | 3:57 |
| 7. | "Lenny J" | 3:29 |
| Total length: | | 26:58 |

== Charts ==
| Chart (2014) | Peak position |
|---|---|
| Oricon Weekly Albums | 3 |
| Oricon Indies Albums | 1 |
| Billboard Japan Top Albums | 3 |
| Billboard Japan Top Independent | 4 |
