= Toraji Haiji =

Japanese pop music group

- Origin: Japan
- Genre: Pop
- Years active: 2004–2005
- Label: Johnny's Entertainment
- Past members: Taichi Kokubun; Tsuyoshi Domoto

Toraji Haiji (トラジ・ハイジ, Toraji Haiji) was a temporary idol unit formed in December 2004 by Taichi Kokubun of Tokio and Tsuyoshi Domoto of Kinki Kids. The unit was created to promote the 2005 comedy film Fantastipo, which stars Kokubun and Domoto.

Their first appearance as a unit was on 21 January 2005 when they performed their debut song "Fantastipo" on Music Station. They also performed the song on Hey! Hey! Hey! Music Champ and Utaban on 24 January and 27 January, respectively. "Fantastipo" was released on 26 January 2005. The song was used as the theme song for the film. It sold over 201,000 copies in its first week and topped the Oricon Singles Chart. "Fantastipo" charted for 25 weeks and sold over 420,000 copies, becoming the ninth best-selling single of 2005 in Japan.

On 24 August 2005, Toraji Haiji released a DVD titled Fantastipo. The DVD peaked at number four on the Oricon Comprehensive DVD Chart and charted for six weeks.

Fantastipo will be released on Blu-ray on 26 December 2018.

== Members ==
- Toraji Koinobori (鯉之堀トラジ) - Taichi Kokubun (Tokio)
- Haiji Koinobori (鯉之堀ハイジ) - Tsuyoshi Domoto (KinKi Kids)
