= Good Time (Jin Akanishi song) =

Single by Jin Akanishi
- B-side: "Heart Beat"
- Released: August 6, 2014
- Recorded: 2014
- Genre: Pop; dance; contemporary R&B
- Length: 3:54
- Label: Go Good Records
- Songwriters: Jin Akanishi; Zen Nishizawa; Dominic Pierson; Justin (This Just-In) Wilson)
- Producers: Jin Akanishi; Justin (This Just-In) Wilson

Jin Akanishi singles chronology
"Ai Naru Hō e" (2013)	"Good Time" (2014)

"Good Time" is the fifth physical solo single by Japanese singer-songwriter Jin Akanishi. It was released on August 6, 2014, by his newly founded independent record label Go Good Records. It was also made available on iTunes Store across the globe.

== Background ==
In 2014, on March 2 was made known to the public that Akanishi had decided not to renew his contract with Johnny & Associates, and had left the agency as of February 28. On July 4, was announced that he had set up his own independent label, Go Good Records, and that opened his new fan club, "JIP's" (Jin's Important People). In November was released new EP Mi Amor.

== Release ==
The single was released in two different editions, the standard and limited edition. The standard edition besides the title song also includes "Heart Beat" and "Slow" as well their instrumental versions. The limited edition A additionally contains only "Slow" and includes a DVD featuring the title track's music video as well as its making-of video, while edition B additionally contains only "Heart Beat" and 24-page photo book.

Akanishi commented about the title track how he "wrote this song with the image of summer", and expressed hope that those who listen to this song "enjoy every day of their lives".

== Chart performance ==
The single was released on August 6, 2014, and in the first week it debuted at number two on Oricon weekly singles chart, selling 39,746 copies. It stayed on the charts for six weeks. It has peaked at number eight on the Billboards Japan Hot 100, and at number two on the Hot Singles Sales chart. As was released by an independent label, it peaked at number three on Billboard Japan Top Independent Albums and Singles chart, while on Oricon Indies Singles chart peaked at number one, as well was the third top-selling Indie single of the year.

== Track listing ==
All tracks are written by Jin Akanishi, Zen Nishizawa, Dominic Pierson, Justin (This Just-In) Wilson).

Standard Edition
No.	Title	Length
1.	"Good Time"	3:54
2.	"Heart Beat"	3:54
3.	"Slow"	3:48
4.	"Good Time" (Instrumental)	3:54
5.	"Heart Beat" (Instrumental)	3:54
6.	"Slow" (Instrumental)	3:48

== Charts ==
Chart (2014)	Peak position
Oricon Weekly Singles	2
Oricon Indies Singles	1
Billboard Japan Hot 100	8
Billboard Japan Top Independent	3
