= Fantastipo =

- Directed by: Shogo Yabuuchi
- Written by: Shogo Yabuuchi
- Produced by: Julie K. Fujishima; Kazuteru Harafuji
- Starring: Tsuyoshi Domoto; Taichi Kokubun; Akira Takarada; Medaka Ikeno
- Cinematography: Kenji Takama
- Music by: Fantastipo by Toraji Haiji
- Distributed by: Geneon Entertainment
- Release date: February 10, 2005
- Running time: 109 minutes
- Country: Japan
- Language: Japanese

Fantastipo (ファンタスティポ) is a 2005 Japanese film directed by Shogo Yabuuchi starring Tsuyoshi Domoto (Kinki Kids) and Taichi Kokubun (TOKIO). The theme song "Fantastipo" is sung by the special unit of the 2 lead actors Toraji Haiji.

== Story ==
The film mainly revolves around two siblings; the mostly dependable Toraji (Taichi Kokubun of TOKIO), and the free-spirited Haiji (Tsuyoshi Domoto of Kinki Kids). The two suddenly become President and Executive Director of Armadillo, Inc. as a result of their father, Kintaro Koinobori (Akira Takarada), stepping down from his position and appointing his sons in his stead.

With the help of their father, the two brothers continue to keep Armadillo Inc. at the top of the heap. Slowly, but surely the relationship among all three begins to deteriorate in the process.

Through trials and tribulations, the siblings slowly begin to learn the true meaning of family.

Will the family hold together? Will they pull through? The answer may lie in a song the boys are composing.

That song's name is Fantastipo

== Trivia ==
- Fantastipo marks Tsuyoshi Domoto's return to the silver screen, last appearing in Kindaichi Shonen's Case File: Legend of Shanghai Mermaid in 1997. The film is a milestone for Taichi Kokubun, who makes his feature film debut.
- The "Fantastipo" single and Toraji Haiji unit was a big hit in 2005. Especially famous for their uniquely cute dance choreography and catchy single which sold more than 400,000 copies.
- Fantastipo is the fourth movie released under the banner of Johnny's Entertainment J STORM Company.

== Cast ==
Actor	Role
Tsuyoshi Domoto	Haiji
Taichi Kokubun	Toraji
Akira Takarada	Kintarō Koinobori
Medaka Ikeno	Frankie
Nanako Ôkôchi	Matthewko
Kimika Yoshino	Kahori
Hiroshi Fujioka	
