= Hikaru Genji (band) =

Japanese boy band

Hikaru Genji 光GENJI(ひかるゲンジ)
- Origin: Japan
- Genres: Pop
- Years active: 1987–1995
- Label: Pony Canyon
- Past members: Hikaru; Kohji Uchiumi; Mikio Osawa (1987–1994); Genji; Kazumi Morohoshi; Hiroyuki Sato (1987–1994); Junichi Yamamoto; Akira Akasaka; Atsuhiro Sato; Hidetaka Tashiro (1987)

Hikaru Genji (光GENJI(ひかるゲンジ)) was a Japanese pop music idol group named after the character Hikaru Genji of The Tale of Genji. They were managed by Japanese talent agency Johnny & Associates from 1987 to 1995.

== History ==
Until the appearance of another pop group represented by Johnny & Associates (Hey! Say! 7) in 2007, Hikaru Genji held the record for the youngest male group to top the Oricon singles charts. In 1988, Hikaru Genji became the second artist in history to monopolize the top three spots on the Oricon singles chart and the third artist in history to dominate the top two spots on the charts. They also won the Japan Record Award in the 30th Japan Record Awards for their song "Paradise Ginga" that same year, making them the second Johnny's artist to win the award after Masahiko Kondo and the last before Johnny & Associates established a policy that would decline all future nominations of awards from organizations such as the Japan Record Awards and the Japan Academy Awards.

In 1994, Mikio Osawa and Hiroyuki Sato left the group and the remaining members formed Hikaru Genji Super 5, which disbanded a year later. Of these five, Kazumi Morohoshi and Junichi Yamamoto have since left the company. Only Atsuhiro Sato and Kohji Uchiumi currently remain with Johnny & Associates as Akira Akasaka was arrested for possession of methamphetamine on October 28, 2007, and was subsequently fired.

== Members ==
Hikaru

- Kohji Uchiumi (内海(うちうみ) 光司(こうじ), Uchiumi Kōji; born January 11, 1968): Leader
- Mikio Osawa (大沢(おおさわ) 樹生(みきお), Ōsawa Mikio; born April 20, 1969): Vocal

Genji

- Kazumi Morohoshi (諸星(もろほし) 和己(かずみ), Morohoshi Kazumi; born August 12, 1970): Center
- Hiroyuki Sato (佐藤(さとう) 寛之(ひろゆき), Satō Hiroyuki; born November 2, 1970): Vocal
- Junichi Yamamoto (山本(やまもと) 淳一(じゅんいち), Yamamoto Jun'ichi; born February 28, 1972): Main Vocal
- Akira Akasaka (赤坂(あかさか) 晃(あきら), Akasaka Akira; born May 8, 1973): Vocal
- Atsuhiro Sato (佐藤(さとう) 敦啓(あつひろ), Satō Atsuhiro; born August 30, 1973): Vocal

== Hikaru Genji Discography ==
=== Singles ===
1. "Star Light"
2. "Glass no Jūdai" (ガラスの十代)
3. "Paradise Ginga" (パラダイス銀河)
4. "Diamond Hurricane" (Diamond(ダイヤモンド)ハリケーン)
5. "Tsurugi no Mai" (剣の舞)
6. "Chikyū wo Sagashite" (地球をさがして)
7. "Taiyō ga Ippai" (太陽がいっぱい)
8. "Kōya no Megalopolis" (荒野のメガロポリス)
9. "Little Birthday"
10. "Co Co Ro"
11. "Waratte Yo" (笑ってよ)
12. "Kaze no Naka no Shonen" (風の中の少年)
13. "Kiseki no Megami" (奇跡の女神)
14. "Winning Run"
15. "Growing Up"
16. "Take Off"
17. "Lila no Saku koro Barcelona" (リラの咲くころバルセロナへ)
18. "Meet Me"
19. "Ai Shite mo ii Desu Ka" (愛してもいいですか)
20. "Kimi to Subayaku Slowly" (君とすばやくSLOWLY)
21. "Yūki 100%" (勇気100%, Courage 100%)
22. "Boys in August"
23. "Kono Aki... Hitorijanai" (この秋···ひとりじゃない)
24. "Bravo! Nippon: Yuki to Kōri no Fantasy" (BRAVO!Nippon～雪と氷のファンタジー～)
25. "Yōsorō! Mirai he Yoroshiku" (ヨーソロー!未来へよろしく)
26. "Try to Remember"

=== Albums ===
1. Hikaru Genji (光GENJI)
2. Hi!
3. Hey! Say!
4. Hello... I Love You
5. Furikaette Tomorrow (ふりかえってTomorrow)
6. Cool Summer
7. White Dreaming with Hikaru Genji (White Dreaming with 光GENJI)
8. 333 Thank You
9. Hito Natsu Hito Yoru (ひと夏ひと夜)
10. Victory
11. Best Friends
12. Pocket Album: 7 Tsuno Hoshi (Pocket Album~7つの星)
13. Dream Passport
14. Speedy Age
15. Welcome
16. Uchū Yū Ei (宇宙遊詠)
17. Heart'n Hearts
18. Forever Yours
19. Super Best Try to Remember
20. See You Again

== Hikaru Genji Super 5 Discography ==
=== Singles ===
1. "Melody Five"
2. "Don't Mind Namida" (Don't mind 涙)
3. "Bye-Bye"

=== Album ===
1. Someone Special

== Awards ==
=== Japan Record Awards ===
Year	Nominee / work	Award	Result
1988	"Paradise Ginga"	Japan Record Award	Won

=== Japan Gold Disc Awards ===
Hikaru Genji won fifteen awards from Recording Industry Association of Japan's annual music awards ceremony, the Japan Gold Disc Awards.

Year	Nominee / work	Award	Result
1988	Hikaru Genji	New Artist Award	Won
1988	Hikaru Genji	Best 5 New Artist Award	Won
1988	"Glass no Jūdai"	Singles Award	Won
1988	"Starlight"	Singles Award	Won
1988	Hikaru Genji	Album Award	Won
1989	Hikaru Genji	Best 5 Artists	Won
1989	"Paradise Ginga"	Grand Prix Singles Award	Won
1989	"Paradise Ginga"	Best 5 Singles Award	Won
1989	"Diamond Hurricane"	Best 5 Singles Award	Won
1989	"Tsurugi no Mai"	Best 5 Singles Award	Won
1989	Hi!	Album Award	Won
1990	"Taiyō ga Ippai"	Best 5 Singles Award	Won
1991	Furikaette Tomorrow	Album Award	Won
1992	333 Thank You	Album Award	Won
1993	Best Friends	Album Award	Won
