= Eternal (Jin Akanishi song) =

Single by Jin Akanishi

from the album #JustJin
- B-side: "Murasaki"
- Released: March 2, 2011
- Recorded: 2011
- Genre: Pop
- Length: 5:38
- Label: Warner Music Japan
- Songwriter: Jin Akanishi

Jin Akanishi singles chronology
"Bandage" (2009)	"Eternal" (2011)	"Seasons" (2011)

"Eternal" is the first solo single by Japanese singer-songwriter and former KAT-TUN member Jin Akanishi, released on March 2, 2011 by Warner Music Japan. It topped both Oricon and Billboard Japan Hot 100 singles charts.

== Background ==
In February 2010 Akanishi held over 30 concerts titled "You & Jin" in Japan, while in June had 3 sold-out shows at Club Nokia in Los Angeles. In July was announced that he would permanently leave the group KAT-TUN, becoming the first solo artist of Johnny & Associates to perform in the United States. In November was held tour "Yellow Gold Tour 3010", named after the tour's title song "Yellow Gold", and the venues included were Rosemont Theatre in Rosemont, The Warfield in San Francisco, House of Blues in Houston, Club Nokia in Los Angeles, and MTV Iggy Studio and Best Buy Theater in New York City. Akanishi signed a global deal with Warner Music Group in December 2010.

== Release ==
The single was released in standard and limited editions. The limited edition A comes with a bonus DVD with music video of "Eternal" and its making-of plus cover photo shooting from the video making, while limited edition B comes with a 24-page special photo booklet. They both feature an alternate cover artwork.

== Chart performance ==
The single was released on March 2, 2011 by Warner Music Japan, and on its debuting first day it topped the Oricon daily singles chart with 161,000 copies sold. By the end of the week it sold 217,000 copies, marking the first time a solo artist’s first week sales exceeded 200,000 in 2 years (the last time was in 2009 when Yusuke’s "Himawari" sold 219,000 copies), It was also the best-selling single of the month, and as it charted for twelve weeks, it was the 8th best-selling single with 241,630 copies sold in the first six-months. By the end of the year it was reported by Oricon that it was 23rd best-selling single, and was certified platinum by RIAJ denoting over 250,000 shipments.

It has also peaked at number one on the Billboard's Japan Hot 100 and Hot Singles Sales, as well number six on Hot Top Airplay.

== Track listing ==
All tracks are written by Jin Akanishi.

Regular Edition
No.	Title	Length
1.	"Eternal"	5:38
2.	"Murasaki" (ムラサキ)	3:13
3.	"Eternal" (Instrumental)	5:38
4.	"Murasaki" (Instrumental)	3:13

CD + DVD, Limited Edition A
No.	Title	Length
1.	"Eternal" (Video clip + Making clip)
2.	"Murasaki"
3.	"Eternal" (Instrumental)
4.	"Murasaki" (Instrumental)

Limited Edition B
No.	Title	Length
1.	"Eternal"
2.	"Murasaki"
3.	"Eternal" (Instrumental)
4.	"Murasaki" (Instrumental)

== Charts ==
Chart (2011)	Peak position
Oricon Weekly Singles	1
Billboard Japan Hot 100	1
Taiwan G-Music	20
Taiwan G-Music East Asian	4
