= Yuki Shibamoto =

Japanese actress (born 1983)

- 柴本 幸
- Born: 18 October 1983 (age 42); Tokyo, Japan
- Education: Keio University Department of Literature
- Occupations: Actress, Recorder player, Composer
- Years active: 2007–present
- Notable work: Watashi wa Kaininaritai; Tajomaru; A Midsummer Night's Dream; Bandage
- Television: Fūrin Kazan; Shika Otoko awoniyoshi
- Height: 170 cm (5 ft 7 in)
- Parents: Toshio Shiba (father); Kyoko Maya (mother)
- Relatives: Azusa Mano (aunt)
- Website: Official website

Yuki Shibamoto (柴本 幸, Shibamoto Yuki; born 18 October 1983, in Tokyo) is a Japanese actress, recorder player, and composer.

Her father is Toshio Shiba, her mother is Kyoko Maya, and her aunt is Azusa Mano, who are all also actors.

== Filmography ==
=== TV dramas ===
Year	Title	Role	Network	Ref.
2007	Fūrin Kazan	Yūhime	NHK	
2008	Shika Otoko awoniyoshi	Mie Nagaoka	Fuji TV	
2008	Tokyo Dai Kūshū	Kazue Yamada	NTV	
2009	Akuma no Temariuta	Satoko Aochi	Fuji TV	
2010	Shinsanmono	Maki Yanagisawa	TBS	
2010	Rikon Syndrome	Kako Tanaka	NTV	
2011	Kōkōsei Restaurant	Hitomi Togo	NTV	
2012	Unmei no Hito	Fusako Aoyama	TBS	
2012	NHK Saga Hōsōkyoku 70 Shūnenkinen Chiiki Drama "Ano hito ano Ni"		NHK Saga	
2012	Usuzakura-ki	Chiharu Nagao	NHK BS Premium	
2012	Keigo Higashino Mysteries	Kumiko Ando	Fuji TV	
2012	Aibō Season 11	Machiko Fushigida	TV Asahi	
2013	dinner	Eriko Motomiya	Fuji TV	
2014	ST Aka to Shirō no Sōsa File	Momoko Tsutsui	NTV	
2014	N no tame ni	Yuki Miyamoto	TBS	
2014	Tokkō Jimuin Minowa	Saori Shinjo	YTV	
2015	Genkai Shūraku Kabushikigaisha	Mariko Ninomiya	NHK	
2015	Red Cross: Onna-tachi no Akagami	Tami Muramoto	TBS	
2015	Gisō no Fūfu	Sumire Hara	NTV	
2016	Doctor Chōsa Han: Iryō Jiko no Yami o Abake	Nanami Kotozuka	TV Tokyo	
2016	Kasei Otto no Mitazono	Ran Fujikawa	TV Asahi	
2016	Munesue Keiji no Nise Kanzen Hanzai	Nobue Mizuno	TV Asahi	
2016	Hōigaku Kyōshitsu no Jiken File 42	Mariko Shinkai	TV Asahi	

=== Films ===
Year	Title	Role	Ref.
2007	Tonari Machisensō	Kinoshita	
2008	Watashi wa Kai ninaritai	Toshiko	
2009	A Midsummer Night's Dream	Yuriko	
2009	Tajomaru	Akohime	
2010	Bandage	Arumi	
2019	Ghost Master		

=== Stage ===
Year	Title	Role
2009	Tattoo	
2009	Kaidan Botan Dōrō	Oro
2010	Jeanne d'Arc	
2011	Suzakuke no Metsubō	Akitsuko Matsunaga

=== Magazines ===
Title	Publisher	Notes
Boao	Magazine House	Exclusive model

=== Advertisements ===
Year	Title
2007	Eisai Chocola BB Royal "Tsukare ni Todoke"
