= Seasons (Jin Akanishi song) =

Single by Jin Akanishi

from the album #JustJin
- B-side: "The Firth Season"
- Released: December 28, 2011
- Recorded: 2011
- Genre: Pop
- Length: 4:07
- Label: Warner Music Japan
- Songwriters: Jin Akanishi, Zen Nishizawa, Dominic Pierson

Jin Akanishi singles chronology
"Eternal" (2011)	"Seasons" (2011)	"Sun Burns Down" (2012)

"Seasons" is the second solo single by Japanese singer-songwriter Jin Akanishi, released on December 28, 2011.

== Background ==
The single was released in the same month as the extended play Test Drive, and on January 6, 2012, was followed by a sold-out concert at 12,000 seat Yokohama Arena, which was live streamed at the Grammy Museum.

== Release ==
The single was released in two different editions, the regular or standard edition, which includes a special 16-page photo booklet, and a limited edition, which includes a DVD featuring the title track's music video as well as its making-of video. There are four different cover artworks for the limited edition to match the single's four seasons theme. Akanishi commented about the title track, "It’s a love song, but it is not only for men and women, or lovers. It’s a song of love toward everything, including family or friends who you cherish".

== Chart performance ==
The single was released on December 28, 2011, by Warner Music Japan, and in the first week of January 2012 it debuted at number one on Oricon weekly singles chart. It stayed on the charts for eight weeks, and with 114,000 copies sold it was the 67th best-selling single of the year, and was certified Gold by RIAJ denoting over 100,000 shipments.

It has also peaked at number twenty four on the Billboards Japan Hot 100, and number one on the Hot Singles Sales chart.

== Track listing ==
All tracks are written by Jin Akanishi, Dominic Pierson.

Regular Edition
No.	Title	Length
1.	"Seasons"	4:07
2.	"The Fifth Season"	3:33
3.	"Seasons" (Instrumental)	4:07
4.	"The Fifth Season" (Instrumental)	3:33

CD + DVD, Limited Edition
No.	Title	Length
1.	"Seasons" (Video clip + Making clip)

== Charts ==
Chart (2012)	Peak position
Oricon Weekly Singles	1
Billboard Japan Hot 100	24
Taiwan G-Music East Asian	3
