= Ai Naru Hō e =

Single by Jin Akanishi

from the album #JustJin
- B-side: "Forever"
- Released: October 2, 2013
- Recorded: 2013
- Genre: Pop
- Length: 4:01
- Label: Warner Music Japan
- Songwriter(s): Jin Akanishi, Zen Nishizawa, Lensei
- Producer(s): Jin Akanishi

Jin Akanishi singles chronology
"Hey What's Up?" (2012)	"Ai Naru Hō e" (2013)	"Good Time" (2014)

"'Ai Naru Hō e'" (アイナルホウエ, "To Where Love Rings") is the fourth physical solo single by Japanese singer-songwriter Jin Akanishi, released on October 2, 2013.

== Background ==
The song was announced on August 31, 2013, at the Tokyo Girls Collection fashion show, which was held that same month at the Saitama Super Arena. In November was released his second studio album #JustJin.

== Release ==
The single was released in two different editions, the standard or regular edition, which opposite of the limited edition's only b-side song "Forever" it additionally includes the song "One Last Time". There two different limited editions; the edition A includes a DVD featuring the title track’s music video as well as its making-of video, while edition B features a special photo book.

Akanishi commented about the title track how it's a "support song" that sings "to come in the direction where love sounds".

The music video was directed by Takeshi Maruyama, and it shows people of different nationalities from babies to grandparents.

== Chart performance ==
The single was released on October 2, 2013 by Warner Music Japan, and in the first week it debuted at number three on Oricon weekly singles chart, selling 42,263 copies. It stayed on the charts for six weeks. It has peaked at number four on the Billboards Japan Hot 100, and at number two on the Hot Singles Sales chart. It also peaked at number thirteen on Hot Top Airplay, and number twenty-two on Adult Contemporary Airplay.

== Track listing ==
All lyrics are written by Jin Akanishi; all music is composed by Jin Akanishi, Lensei, Zen Nishizawa, Dominic Pierson

Standard Edition
No.	Title	Length
1.	"Ai Naru Hō e" (アイナルホウエ)	4:01
2.	"Forever"	3:15
3.	"One Last Time"	3:25
4.	"Ai Naru Hō e" (Instrumental)	4:01
5.	"Forever" (Instrumental)	3:15
6.	"One Last Time" (Instrumental)	3:25

== Charts ==
Charts (2013)	Peak position
Oricon Weekly Singles	3
Billboard Japan Hot 100	4
Billboard Japan Adult Contemporary Airplay	18
