= Sun Burns Down =

Single by Jin Akanishi

from the album Japonicana
- Released: January 24, 2012
- Recorded: 2011–2012
- Genre: Dance, electronic
- Length: 3:36
- Label: Warner Music Japan
- Songwriter(s): J. Akanishi, Jeremy Reeves
- Producer(s): The Stereotypes

Jin Akanishi singles chronology
| "Seasons" (2011) | "Sun Burns Down" (2012) | "Hey What's Up?" (2013) |

"Sun Burns Down" is a digital single by Japanese singer-songwriter Jin Akanishi, released on January 24, 2012.

== Background ==
Prior to the single release, on January 6, 2012 was held a sold-out concert at 12,000 seat Yokohama Arena, which was streamed live at the Grammy Museum. It was followed by the release of debut studio album Japonicana in March 2012.

== Release ==
The single was made available digitally through all digital retailers and streaming services from January 24, and its music video premiered on January 20 on YouTube. It was produced by The Stereotypes.

== Chart performance ==
The single was released by Warner Music Japan, and in the first week debuted at number twenty-three on Billboard Japan Hot 100, and the successive week peaked at number nineteen. On the Billboard Japan Top Airplay peaked at number seven. In American Billboard charts it peaked at number one on Hot Singles Sales, and on Dance Singles Sales, while number thirty-five on Hot Dance Club Songs chart.

== Track listing ==
All tracks are written by J. Akanishi, J. Reeves

| No. | Title | Length |
|---|---|---|
| 1. | "Sun Burns Down" | 3:36 |
| 2. | "Sun Burns Down" (Bill Hamel & Meaux Green Remix) | 5:11 |
| 3. | "Sun Burns Down" (7th Heaven Club Mix) | 6:51 |
| 4. | "Sun Burns Down" (Razor & Guido Main) | 8:12 |

== Charts ==
| Chart (2012) | Peak position |
|---|---|
| Billboard Japan Hot 100 | 23 |
| Billboard Dance Singles Sales | 1 |
| Billboard Hot Dance Club Songs | 35 |
