= Jin Akanishi =

Japanese musician and actor (born 1984)

- 赤西 仁
- Born: July 4, 1984 (age 42); Kōtō, Tokyo, Japan
- Occupations: Singer-songwriter; actor
- Spouse: Meisa Kuroki (m. 2012; div. 2023)
- Children: 2
- Musical career
- Genres: J-Pop; dance; R&B; hip hop; electronic
- Instrument: Vocals
- Years active: 1998–present
- Labels: J-One; Warner; Go Good/EMI (current)
- Website: jinakanishi.com

Jin Akanishi (赤西 仁, Akanishi Jin; born July 4, 1984) is a Japanese singer-songwriter and actor. He has been active since 1998 as one of the two lead vocalists of the J-pop boy-band KAT-TUN before starting a solo career in 2009. Akanishi has also acted in several films and dramas.

== Biography ==
=== Early life ===
Akanishi was born in Chiba Prefecture, Greater Tokyo Area, Japan on July 4, 1984, as the eldest of two sons. He has a younger brother Reio, who also works in the entertainment industry as an actor under the stage name Fuuta. Akanishi moved to Tokyo in the first grade.

In 1997, when he was still in grade school, a classmate sent in a photo of him to idol magazine Myojo, and he was featured in the "Cool Classmates" corner of the issue. Akanishi expressed interest in the entertainment industry and his mother thus sent in an application to Johnny's Entertainment on his behalf in 1998. Though he technically failed his audition on November 8, 1998, he was told to stay when he tried to return his number plate to a man who happened to be Johnny Kitagawa himself.

=== 2001–2009: Early career and debut of KAT-TUN ===
After he was made a Johnny's Jr. member in 2000, Akanishi was part of a number of groups like Musical Academy Dancing, J2000 and B.A.D., before being drafted into a six-member unit in 2001 with other juniors Kazuya Kamenashi, Junnosuke Taguchi, Koki Tanaka, Tatsuya Ueda and Yuichi Nakamaru. Though the group was originally meant to only be backup dancers for Koichi Domoto of KinKi Kids, the sextet's unexpected popularity led their agency to allow them to expand into a separate group called KAT-TUN, an acronym formed by the first letter of the members' surnames. Despite the group's popularity (they even released DVDs of their live concerts in 2003 and 2005—a first for Johnny's groups that hadn't debuted), they were not allowed to make their bow until five years later in 2006, to immense success.

Much to the Japanese public's surprise, Akanishi announced in a press conference on October 13, 2006, that he was leaving the country to study English abroad for an indefinite amount of time. Despite his absence, KAT-TUN were obliged to continue its activities Akanishi finally returned from Los Angeles in the United States after six months on April 19, 2007. He quickly resumed work by joining his bandmates on their nationwide tour on April 21.

Akanishi was also a songwriter for the group, having written songs for KAT-TUN and for himself, including "Hesitate", "Love or Like" (from Cartoon KAT-TUN II You), "Lovejuice" (B-side of the limited edition 2 of "Don't U Ever Stop"), "Care" (from Break the Records: By You & For You), and "Wonder". The song "Wonder" is a collaboration with R&B artist, Crystal Kay in 2009, and Akanishi also featured in her song "Helpless Night". He can play the guitar and has composed both music and lyrics for "Murasaki (ムラサキ)", "ha-ha" and "Pinky". He also collaborated with bandmate Ueda to create the song, "Butterfly" (from Best of KAT-TUN).

=== 2009–2010: Solo debut and working with LANDS ===
At the event of Tokyo Girls Collection on September 5, 2009, Jin appeared as a special guest to promote his new movie, Bandage, and he performed the movie's theme song which marked this as the solo debut under the temporary band unit, LANDS, with Takeshi Kobayashi, the producer of Mr. Children. Kobayashi wrote the lyrics and music of their debut single "Bandage". It was released on November 25, and debuted at number one on the Oricon charts. In 2010, on January 13, was released the studio album Olympos, which also topped the Oricon charts. On January 19, the band held their only live concert, titled LANDS Last Live.

Akanishi had a series of solo concerts, titled "You & Jin", comprising a total of 32 shows from February 7 to 28, 2010. The song "A Page", he co-wrote, composed and arranged, featured at his concerts, was released as part of KAT-TUN's 11th single, "Love Yourself (Kimi ga Kirai na Kimi ga Suki)", on the 2nd limited edition. On June 19 and 20, Akanishi's solo tour "You & Jin" had a 3 sold-out show tour in Los Angeles, California.

In the last show of his "You & Jin" concert Akanishi announced a tour in the United States. In July, Akanishi announced that he would permanently leave the band KAT-TUN, becoming a solo artist of Johnny & Associates. On September 16, dates were released for Akanishi's November tour "Yellow Gold Tour 3010", named after the tour's title song "Yellow Gold", and the cities included were Chicago, New York City, Houston, Los Angeles and San Francisco. The tour featured songs entirely in English, mostly written and produced by the Akanishi himself.

On December 9, 2010, it was announced that Jin will be joining the Warner Music Group and Warner Music Japan on a global basis and became responsible for his recording career in both English and Japanese language. After the "Yellow Gold Tour 3010" ended with success, Jin returned to Japan to hold "Yellow Gold Tour 3011" with total 12 concerts in Osaka-jō Hall, World Memorial Hall, Nippon Budokan and Saitama Super Arena.

=== 2011–2013: The U.S. debut, Japonicana and #JustJin ===
Jin's first solo single titled "Eternal" was released on March 2, 2011, in Japan, and topped both Oricon and Japan Hot 100 charts. His debut single in the United States was the digitally released extended play Test Drive released on November 8, a collaboration with singer-songwriter Jason Derulo and producer J. R. Rotem. It reached the number one spot on the iTunes Dance Charts, and tenth spot on the overall Albums chart. The Japanese release was on December 7, and it peaked at number fourteen on the Japan Hot 100, and topped both Oricon and Billboard album charts in Japan. On December 28, was released his second physical single in Japan, Seasons, which also topped the charts.

In 2012, on January 26 his second US digital single "Sun Burns Down" was released, and reached the number one spot on the iTunes Dance Charts again. On March 6, was released his debut studio album Japonicana, on which collaborated with The Stereotypes and Static Revenger. It reached number two on the Oricon charts. From March 9 to 17 was held a promotional concert tour, which started at Club Nokia in Los Angeles. In Japan from April to May was scheduled to hold 7 concerts in 5 cities including Tokyo and Osaka for a total of 70,000 people, but his further plans were abruptly cancelled due to a penalty by his own agency Johnny's Entertainment because didn't contacted his agency beforehand and reported his marriage at time.

In 2013, on August 7 was released his third single in Japan, "Hey What's Up?", which was chosen as the first official theme song for the Tokyo Girls Collection fashion show, which was held on the 31st of that same month at the Saitama Super Arena. It reached number two on the Oricon charts. On October 2 was released the fourth single "Ai Naru Hō e" (To Where Love Rings), which reached number three on the charts.

On November 6 Akanishi released his second studio album #JustJin. The self-produced album included all the singles released in Japan since his solo debut in 2011, and a second bonus disc featured songs written in English during his Japonicana era. It reached number three on the charts.

=== 2014–present: Indies debut and Mi Amor ===
In 2014, on March 2 was made known to the public that Akanishi had decided not to renew his contract with Johnny & Associates, and had left the agency as of February 28. On July 4, was announced that he had set up his own independent label, Go Good Records, and that opened his new fan club, "JIP's" (Jin's Important People).

On August 6, under Go Good Records Akanishi re-debuted with his fifth physical single "Good Time". It reached number two on the charts. The single was also made available on the iTunes Store across the globe.

On November 12 Akanishi released his second extended play, Mi Amor, and the second release from his own record label. It reached number three on the charts. The entire album was written, composed, and produced by Akanishi himself. The previous day of the release, on November 11 Akanishi went on a nationwide "Jindependence" tour from Zepp Sapporo, which ended on December 2 at Zepp Tokyo, with a total of 11 shows in 5 cities.

He collaborated with Takayuki Yamada in August 2016 to form the unit called "Jintaka", which disbanded 2 months later. The duo released their only single "Choo choo shitain" on September 21.

Akanishi and former KAT-TUN co–member Kazuya Kamenashi posted on November 8, 2026 on their respective SNS a message, Kamenashi posted the words "Coming soon" and Akanishi posted "Hello" along with a joint website under the domain "jinkame.com", and in it, their names and a clock countdown marking two days.

== Filmography ==
Akanishi made his debut as an actor in 1999 in a cameo appearance in the second episode of NTV's romance comedy, P.P.O.I., and also had small roles in TV Asahi's Best Friend, Omae no yukichi ga naiteiru and in NHK series, Haregi, Koko Ichiban. He also started appearing in musicals from 2000 taking on supporting roles in Millennium Shock (2000), Show Geki Shock (2001–2002), Dream Boy (2004) and Dream Boys (2006). Akanishi returned to the small screen in 2005 in the second season of the award-winning and popular NTV school drama, Gokusen, starring opposite Yukie Nakama and former bandmate Kazuya Kamenashi. The show won "Best Drama" at the 44th Television Drama Academy Awards and ended its run with an average viewership rating of 27.8%. He also had a supporting role in NTV's romance series, Anego, the same year.

In 2007, Akanishi starred in his first lead role in Yukan Club, a school comedy series, with ex-bandmate Junnosuke Taguchi and was voted "Best Actor" at the 11th Nikkan Sports Drama Grand Prix. He made his debut as a voice actor in 2008 for the Japanese dub of Speed Racer, providing the voice for protagonist Speed played by Emile Hirsch.

In 2009, Akanishi was cast as the lead actor in the movie Bandage directed by Takeshi Kobayashi and released on January 16, 2010. This marked his debut on the big screen.

In 2013, he made his Hollywood debut with the film 47 Ronin which also had Keanu Reeves in the lead role. Akanishi played the role of Chikara Oishi, the samurai leader's son, played by Hiroyuki Sanada and a close friend to Reeves' character, Kai. The film's director, Carl Rinsch, said he was "impressed by Akanishi's English abilities and motivation". Thus, he turned out to be the second Johnny & Associates artist within the agency after Ninomiya Kazunari in Letters From Iwo Jima to star in a Hollywood movie and the third overall to work with an American director.

Film
Year	Title	Role	Notes
2008	Speed Racer	Speed Racer (voice)	Dubbed the Japanese version of the movie.
2010	Bandage	Natsu Takasugi	Main role and singing voice
2013	47 Ronin	Chikara Oishi	Supporting role
Television
Year	Title	Role	Notes
1999	Nekketsu Ren-ai Dou		1999 TV series, NTV. Minor role
1999	P.P.O.I.	Hisashi Kimura	1999 TV series, NTV. Supporting role.
1999	Kowai Nichiyōbi		1999 TV series, NTV
1999	Best Friend	Ryota Shibuya	1999 TV series, TV Asahi. Supporting role
2000	Taiyō wa Shizumanai		2000 TV series, Episode 6, Fuji TV. Minor role
2000	Haregi, Koko Ichiban		2000 TV series, NHK. Supporting role
2001	Omae no Yukichi ga Naiteiru	Naoto Inoue	2001 TV series, TV Asahi
2005	Xmas Nante Daikirai	Sho Kitagawa	2004 TV series, NTV
2005	Gokusen 2 (ごくせん 2005)	Hayato Yabuki	2005 TV series, NTV. Ensemble cast
2005	Anego (アネゴ)	Akihiko Kurosawa	2005 TV series, NTV
2007	Yukan Club (有閑倶楽部)	Miroku Shochikubai	2007 TV series, NTV. Ensemble cast
2016	Midnight Taxi 2 (午夜计程车第二季)	Ueno	2015–2016 Webseries, Episode 10, Youku Tudou, China.
2023	The Legends of Changing Destiny (凌云志)	Erlang Shen	2023 Webseries, Youku, China.
2025	Romantics Anonymous	Hiro Takada	2025 TV series

=== Theatre ===
Year	Title	Role	Notes
2002	Shock		Ensemble cast
2004	Dream Boy		Ensemble cast
2004	Summary		Ensemble cast
2006	Dream Boys		Ensemble cast

== Personal life ==
Akanishi wed Japanese actress and model Meisa Kuroki in a private ceremony on February 2, 2012, just two weeks after they'd released official statements denying they were seeing one another. The marriage immediately had a negative effect on Akanishi's career, not only because he failed to inform his talent agency, Johnny & Associates, of his plans to wed but because rumors began circulating that Kuroki was pregnant at the time of the wedding. In response to the scandal, his talent agency made the decision to cancel his solo tour. Together, Akanishi and Kuroki have a daughter, Theia Akanishi (Japanese: 赤西 ティア, Akanishi Tia), who was born September 23, 2012, and a son, whose name has not yet been revealed to the public, who was born June 6, 2017. In 2018, it was reported that the family had returned to Japan, having previously resided in Hawaii, and that Theia was attending the American School in Japan. On December 25, 2023, Akanishi and Kuroki announced they had divorced.

== Discography ==
Studio albums

- Japonicana (2012)
- #JustJin (2013)
- Me (2015)
- Audio Fashion (2016)
- Blessèd (2017)
- Thank You (2019)
- Yellow Note (2023)

== Awards and nominations ==
Year	Award	Nominated work	Category	Result
2007	TV Life Annual Drama Awards	Yukan Club	Best Actor	Won
2008	11th Nikkan Sports Drama Grand Prix	Yukan Club	Best Actor	Won
2009	TBS TV Station Program Countdown	Jin Akanishi	Most Trendy Male Artist	Won
2010	35th Hochi Film Awards	Bandage	Best Actor	Nominated
2010	35th Hochi Film Awards	Bandage	Best Newcomer	Nominated
2013	World Music Awards	Jin Akanishi	World's Best Entertainer of the Year	Nominated
2013	World Music Awards	Jin Akanishi	Worlds Best Male Artist	Nominated
2013	World Music Awards	Jin Akanishi	Worlds Best Live Act	Nominated
2016	IQiyi All-Star Carnival	Jin Akanishi	Most Popular Artist in Asia	Won
2016	IQiyi All-Star Carnival	Jin Akanishi	Music of the Year	Won
