= JustJin =

Studio album by Jin Akanishi
- Released: November 6, 2013
- Recorded: 2013
- Genre: Pop, dance, contemporary R&B
- Length: 46:36
- Label: Warner Music Japan
- Producer: Jin Akanishi

Jin Akanishi chronology
Japonicana (2012)	JustJin (2013)	Mi Amor (2014)

Singles from JustJin
- 1. "Eternal" Released: March 2, 2011; 2. "Seasons" Released: December 28, 2011; 3. "Hey What's Up?" Released: August 7, 2013; 4. "Ai Naru Hō e" Released: October 2, 2013

JustJin (stylized as #JustJin) is the second studio album by Japanese singer-songwriter Jin Akanishi, released on November 6, 2013, by Warner Music Group.

== Background ==
This is Akanishi's second full studio album after Japonicana, released on March 6, 2012, both physically and digitally in America. Besides the singles released in 2013, "Hey What's Up?" and "Ai Naru Hō e", it also includes two singles previously released in 2011, "Eternal" and "Seasons".

== Release ==
The album was released in two different editions, standard and limited. The limited edition A comes with an additional CD with eight new English-language songs written between 2012 and 2013, while edition B includes music videos from the four singles featured in the album. The songs on Disc 1 are mostly in Japanese, while those on Disc 2 are mostly in English.

== Touring ==
From November 14 to December 19 the "Club Circuit" concert tour was held, with 12 concerts in 5 cities in Japan. It also included songs from the Japonicana album, as its promotional tour wasn't held in Japan.

== Chart performance ==
The album debuted on the Oricon's daily album charts at number one, selling 23,036 copies. It stayed at number three on the weekly charts, selling 38,542 copies in its first week of release, and charted for seven weeks. On Billboard's Japan Top Albums chart it peaked at number four.

== Track listing ==
Standard edition
No.	Title	Lyrics	Music	Length
1.	"Ai Naru Hō e" (アイナルホウエ)	Jin Akanishi	Jin Akanishi, Zen Nishizawa, Dominic Pierson, Lensei	4:03
2.	"Get Up"	Jin Akanishi	Jin Akanishi, Zen Nishizawa, Dominic Pierson, Lensei	4:04
3.	"Love Song"	Jin Akanishi	Jin Akanishi, Zen Nishizawa, Dominic Pierson	4:30
4.	"Hey What's Up?"	Jin Akanishi	Jin Akanishi, Zen Nishizawa	4:33
5.	"Scream It"	Jin Akanishi	Jin Akanishi, Zen Nishizawa, Dominic Pierson	3:40
6.	"Seasons"	Jin Akanishi, Dominic Pierson	Jin Akanishi, Dominic Pierson	4:09
7.	"Ano Natsu" (アノナツ)	Jin Akanishi	Jin Akanishi, Zen Nishizawa, Dominic Pierson	4:39
8.	"Eternal"	Jin Akanishi	Jin Akanishi	5:36
9.	"TGC"	Jin Akanishi, Zen Nishizawa, Dominic Pierson	Jin Akanishi, Zen Nishizawa, Dominic Pierson	3:20
10.	"Temporary Love"	Jin Akanishi, Zen Nishizawa, Dominic Pierson	Jin Akanishi, Zen Nishizawa, Dominic Pierson	3:55
11.	"New Life"	Jin Akanishi, Zen Nishizawa, Dominic Pierson	Jin Akanishi, Zen Nishizawa, Dominic Pierson	4:03
Total length:				46:36

All lyrics are written by Jin Akanishi; all music is composed by Jin Akanishi, Zen Nishizawa, Dominic Pierson.

Limited edition Disc 2
No.	Title	Length
1.	"TGC"	3:20
2.	"Temporary Love"	3:55
3.	"OohLaLa"	3:38
4.	"Go Higher"	3:28
5.	"Slow Jam"	4:42
6.	"Summer Loving"	3:46
7.	"Ain't Enough"	3:48
8.	"New Life"	4:03
Total length:		30:43

== Charts ==
Charts (2013)	Peak position
Oricon Weekly Albums	3
Billboard Japan Top Albums	4
