= Junichi Yamamoto (singer) =

Japanese singer, actor, tarento, and wrestler

Junichi Yamamoto 山本 淳一
- Born: 28 February 1972 (age 54); Hachiōji, Tokyo, Japan
- Occupations: Singer; actor; tarento
- Years active: 1987–2013; 2014–

Junichi Yamamoto (山本 淳一, Yamamoto Jun'ichi; born 28 February 1972, in Hachiōji, Tokyo) is a Japanese singer, actor, tarento, and professional wrestler. He is a former member of Hikaru Genji (later changed the name to Hikaru Genji Super 5).

Yamamoto graduated from Hachioji-shi Linnan Middle School and Sumida Industrial High School. He is nicknamed Bungee (バンジー, Banjī) and Jun-kun (淳くん). Yamamoto is currently represented with Wing Run.

== Participated units in Johnny's career ==
- Hikaru Genji
- Shōnen Gosanke
- Hikaru Genji Super 5
- Say-S
- Junichi & J Jr

== Discography ==
=== Singles ===
#	Date	Title
1	16 Dec 1992	Arashi ni nare
2	25 Jun 2008	Chikyū wa tomodachi –Eco Rap– (Ayame Kojima × Junichi Yamamoto)
3	6 Aug 2011	Makenai
4	16 May 2012	Shōnen

=== Mini albums ===
#	Date	Title	Recordings	Ref.
1	6 Nov 2002	Artless	1. Eternaly; 2. It's All My Things; 3. Ashita no Uta; 4. Yō wa Mata Nobori	
2	20 Dec 2003	Forge a Link	1. Te o Tsunagō; 2. Dust in the Wind; 3. Keep on Movin'; 4. I Wish I Will..	
3	15 Apr 2016	Keep Chasing	1. Shōnen; 2. Zettai; 3. Fuwari; 4. Nijiiro no Sekai; 5. Yell –Message–; 6. Go Straight	

=== Albums ===
#	Date	Title
1	3 Oct 2012	Junichi Yamamoto

== Filmography ==
Run	Title	Role	Network
7 Oct 1987 –	Abunai Shōnen I, II		TX
11 Oct 1988	Starlight Kids: Shin Hokutoshichisei Densetsu	Shigeru	TBS
17 Jan 1991	Yonimo Kimyōna Monogatari: Jikan yo Tomare		CX
15 Oct 1992	Hikō Shōnen-tachi		NTV
26 Dec 1992	Eiga mitaina Koi shitai: Merry Christmas o Kimi ni		TX

=== Variety shows ===
Dates	Title	Network	Notes	Ref.
6 Apr 2011	Ītabi Yume Kibun SP	TX	Co-starred with Mikio Osawa	
6 Nov 2015	Downtown Now	CX	Co-starred with Kazumi Moroboshi	
23, 30 May 2016	Kore, mō Jikōda yo ne?: Imadakara Kiicha imasukedo...	TX	Co-starred with Mikio Osawa	

=== Films ===
Date	Title	Role	Distributor
18 Dec 1988	Fu-shi-gi-na Baby		Toho
	Eiga Nintama Rantarō	Gekki	

=== Stage ===
Title
Family Musical Pino
Mori wa Ikiteiru

=== Radio ===
Run	Title	Network
	Sore ike! Friday Night	Tochigi Broadcasting
10 Apr 1994 – 31 Mar 2002	Junichi Yamamoto no Just In Music	ABC Radio

=== Internet ===
Run	Title	Website
Aug 2007 – Jun 2008	Junichi Yamamoto no Million Dollar Happy	A'! Toodoroku Hōsōkyoku
24 Mar 2009 – 30 Mar 2010	Minna no Negai o Kanaetai! Kayōbi	A'! Toodoroku Hōsōkyoku
7 Oct 2007 –	Jun! Jun! Megumi! No Akiba Daisuki	A'! Toodoroku Hōsōkyoku

=== Advertisements ===
Run	Brand	Product	Advert	Ref.
Aug–Sep 2016	Theater Pro Wrestling Kachōfūgetsu	Idea Porter Ninja Wars	Ninja Wars Talk Event	

== Bibliography ==
Year	Title	Publisher	Notes
1990	Egao	Shueisha	Hikari genji Zenshū Dai 5-kan. Released in December 1990.
