= Lands (band) =

- Origin: Japan
- Genres: Alternative rock, experimental, Rock, Ska
- Years active: 2009–2010
- Labels: J Storm
- Members: Principal: Jin Akanishi (2009–10, vocals, lyrics); Takeshi Kobayashi (2009-10, keyboardist, producer, composer, lyrics); Other: Kaneko Nobuaki (2009-10, baterist); Shunji Iwai (2009-10, lyrics)
- Website: www.j-storm.co.jp/others

Lands (stylized as LANDS) is a temporary musical band created by the producer of Japanese pop-rock band Mr. Children, Takeshi Kobayashi (小林 武史, Kobayashi Takeshi). The group was created to promote the film Bandage, which stars the Japanese singer and actor Jin Akanishi as the leader and vocalist Natsu (ナツ) of the fictional band. The band released their debut single "Bandage", on November 25, 2009. The single topped the Oricon chart selling 211,000 copies in the first week.

== History ==
In October 2008, it was announced that Jin Akanishi would be starring in a film titled Bandage, where he would play the character Natsu the leader and vocalist of Lands, a four-member band that is set in the 1990s. The film was directed by Takeshi Kobayashi, who was also chosen to create the music for the film. In early November 2008. it was revealed that Kobayashi had written at least five songs for the film and that the fictional band would be planning a "real world" debut. In September 2009, it was reported that Lands would make their debut later in the fall with the single, "Bandage". Nearly a month later it was confirmed that the single would be released on November 25, 2009.

The single debuted at number one on the Oricon single chart. The band released their debut — and last album, Olympos, on January 13, 2010. The album also debuted at number one on the Oricon weekly album charts with the sales of over 103,000 copies. On January 19, 2010, the group held a concert titled, Lands Last Live.
