= Bandage (film) =

- Theatrical release poster
- Directed by: Takeshi Kobayashi
- Screenplay by: Shunji Iwai; Chika Kan
- Based on: Good Dreams by Chika Kan
- Produced by: Takeshi Kobayashi; Shunji Iwai
- Starring: Jin Akanishi; Kie Kitano; Kengo Kora; Yuki Shibamoto; Nobuaki Kaneko; Hideyuki Kasahara
- Cinematography: Kôji Onomichi
- Edited by: Takeshi Kobayashi
- Music by: Takeshi Kobayashi
- Distributed by: Toho
- Release date: January 16, 2010 (Japan)
- Running time: 119 minutes
- Language: Japanese
- Box office: $4,489,883

Bandage (Japanese: バンデイジ, Hepburn: Bandeiji), stylized as BANDAGE, is a 2010 Japanese independent film directed by Takeshi Kobayashi, who also served as the editor, producer and composer. It was written and produced by Shunji Iwai. The film is based on the original novel Good Dreams (Japanese: グッドドリームズ, Hepburn: Guddodorīmuzu) by Chika Kan. Iwai adapted the screenplay along with Kan and renamed it Bandage.

The movie title has actually two meanings, a literal one, which is a play on the words "Band Age", because the story takes place in Japan's early 1990s, the boom of indie rock bands. And a figurative one, in which a certain character uses music as a "bandage" to heal the feeling of worthlessness.

== Plot ==
Back in the 1990s, far before the manufactured pop acts that are now seen on TV, there was a flood of indie rock bands that were televised during talent contests that guaranteed instant fame. Amongst that band boom, a group of young musicians managed to dominate the music scene, a band that shone brightest for a brief moment in time.

Between popularity and talent, they go through various trials and lineup changes in the process. As Lands begins to climb the ladder towards major stardom, tensions within the band rise, they clash with the dark side of music industry, greed and discord surfaces, inevitable frictions emerge, and unrequited love strains their friendship, threatening to pull their bonds apart. These ups and downs are shown from the perspective of Asako, a high school girl who becomes the band's manager through an unexpected coincidence.

== Production ==
Apart from being Kobayashi's directorial debut, he is also in charge of the music production. The project was originally taken by Ryuhei Kitamura, then dropped in 2006. When filming finally started in late 2008, Kobayashi hand-picked a completely different cast for the movie, casting pop singer and actor Jin Akanishi with actress Kie Kitano for the lead roles.

== Music ==
In addition to the film, Jin Akanishi, who portrays the lead singer of Lands in the movie, collaborated in real life with Takeshi Kobayashi to create the rock band Lands as a temporary unit. On September 5, 2009, they debuted at the fashion event Tokyo Girls Collection, appearing as a special guest, performing the movie's theme song.
Kobayashi wrote most of the lyrics and music of the band, with special collaboration of Shunji Iwai and also Jin Akanishi. Although not an official member, the songs feature actual drummer and actor Nobuaki Kaneko of Rize, who also plays the role of the drummer in the film.

Their first single, "Bandage" was released on November 25, 2009, reaching number one in the Oricon chart. Later on, they also released a studio album titled Olympos in January 2010, which also ranked number one in the Japanese music charts. During their short life, Lands has had two consecutive number one releases, breaking a Japanese soundtrack record for an album released in the name of a movie character. The only other time in the history of Japanese music this had happened was in 1996, when Kobayashi's Yentown band (made for Shunji Iwai's movie Swallowtail Butterfly) topped the Oricon charts with their album Montage.

Lands held their first and last concert on January 19, 2010, called Lands Last Live in the Tokyo Metropolitan Area.

== Cast ==
- Jin Akanishi as Natsu Takasugi, Lands vocalist
- Kie Kitano as Asako Suzuki, a high school student
- Kengo Kora as Yukiya Nagato, Lands guitar player
- Yuki Shibamoto as Arumi Suzuhata, Lands keyboardist
- Hideyuki Kasahara as Kenji Yamane, Lands bass player
- Nobuaki Kaneko as Ryuji, Lands drummer
- Ayumi Ito as Nobuko Yukari, Lands manager and former musician
- Anne Watanabe as Miharu, Asako's friend
- Kazuo Zaitsu
- Yoshiyuki Ishizuka
- Mayu Kitaki
- Yoshimasa Kondo as Kokubo
- Hatsunori Hasegawa
- Yuki Saito
- Sogen Tanaka
- Kazuma Suzuki as Toda (Long Run Records employee)
- Toru Kizu
- Natalia Silkina

== Details ==
The pre-screening was held on November 2, 2009 at the Tokyo International Forum.

The movie sold 70,000 advance tickets on its first day of availability, selling more than the big budget movies of the season (Gokusen: The Movie sold 25,000 advance tickets and 20th Century Boys 1: Beginning of the End sold 2,500 advance tickets), setting a live action film record.

== Awards and nominations ==
- 2010 (12th) Udine Far East Film - April 23 – May 1 - "My Movies Audience Award"
- 2010 (23rd) Nikkan Sports Film Awards - December 28, 2010 "Fan Award (Japanese Movie)"
- 2010 35th Hochi Film Awards - 5 Nominations - Best Actor (Jin Akanishi) and Best Newcomer (Jin Akanishi)
