= Johnny & Associates =

Japanese talent agency (1962–2023)

Johnny & Associates, Inc.
- Final logo used from 2018 to 2023

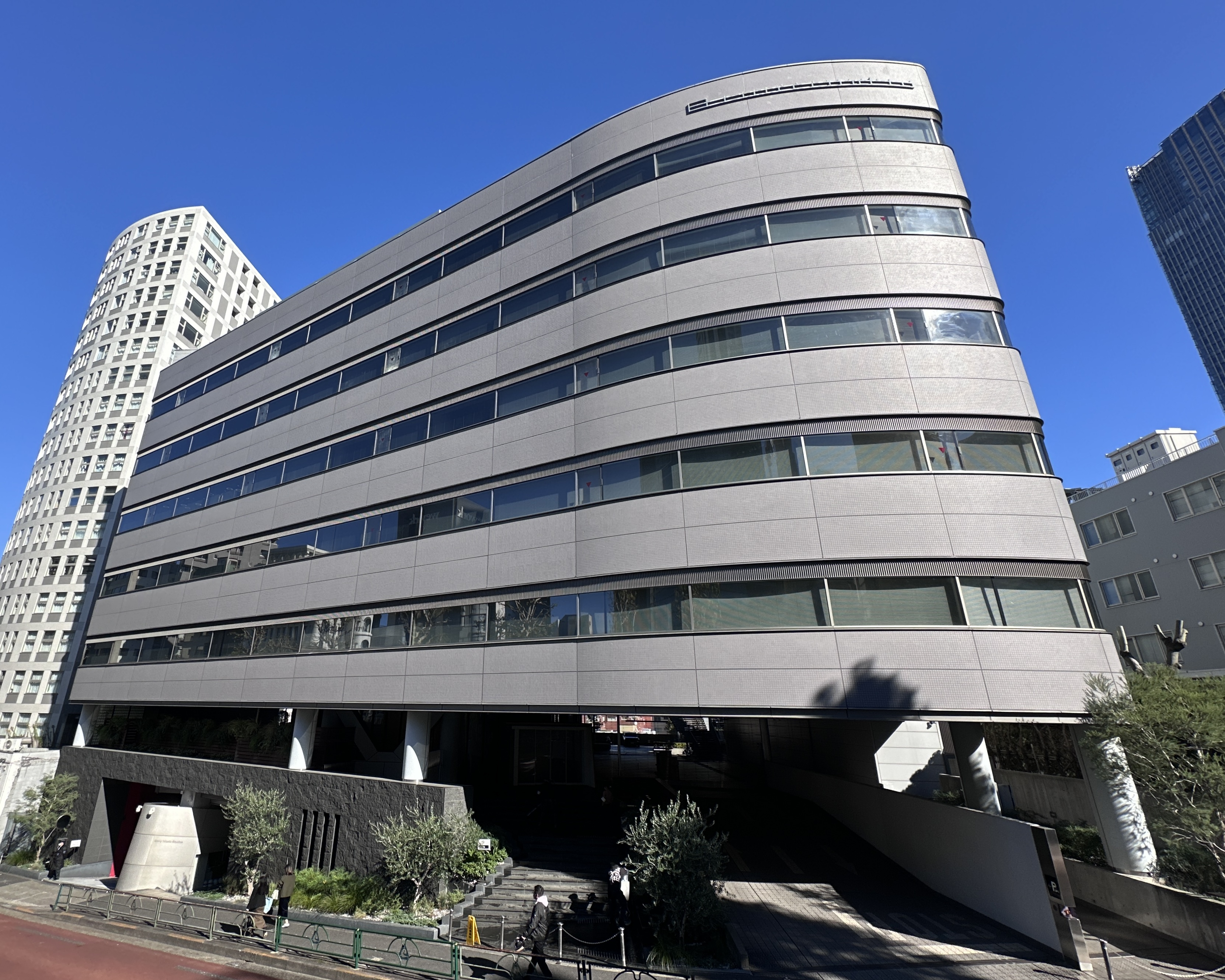
- Headquarters in Minato, Tokyo
- Type: Private (kabushiki gaisha)
- Industry: Entertainment
- Founded: June 1962; 64 years ago
- Founder: Johnny Kitagawa
- Defunct: October 2, 2023; 3 years ago
- Successor: Starto Entertainment
- Headquarters: 9-6-35, Akasaka, Minato, Tokyo, Japan
- Key people: Noriyuki Higashiyama (President & CEO)
- Number of employees: 130
- Subsidiaries: Artbank; MCO; J Base; Johnnys' Island; Johnny's Shuppan; Johnny's Entertainment; Johnny's Music Company; MENT Recording; Tsuzuki Studio; The New Tokyo Globe Theatre; Young Communications; Unison
- Website: www.smile-up.inc

Johnny & Associates, Inc. (Note: 株式会社ジャニーズ事務所, Kabushiki gaisha Janīzu Jimusho) was a Japanese talent agency formed by Johnny Kitagawa in 1962, which managed groups of male idols known as Johnny's. (Note: ジャニーズ, Janīzu) The company had a significant impact on pop culture with male idols and boy bands in Japan since the 1980s. Until 2019, the company was known for its strict policies regarding music distribution abroad and its strict control over the right of publicity to using the likeness of idols under its management.

In the wake of continuing child sexual abuse cases directed against Kitagawa, who died in 2019, his niece, Julie Keiko Fujishima, stepped down as president in September 2023. On October 2, 2023, Johnny & Associates announced that they would be splitting into two entities: The existing company would be rebranded to Smile-Up, a firm focused on reparations for Kitagawa's sexual abuse cases, and Starto Entertainment, a talent agency managing the acts that had been managed under Johnny & Associates.

== History ==
=== 1962–1989 ===
In 1962, Kitagawa launched his first group, Johnnys. In its early days, Kitagawa's agency rented an office space owned by Watanabe Productions, operating under its management as well. Six years later, Four Leaves, a boy band created by the agency, became successful. Four Leaves left a lasting legacy to the industry because it was produced as a "Group sounds band that does not play instruments", a product of Kitagawa's taste for emphasizing the attributes, personality and physical abilities of a performer. Kitagawa formed a number of other successful acts, such as Masahiko Kondō, whose song "Orokamono" (愚か者, Fool), won the 1987 Japan Record Award, and Hikaru Genji, the first Johnny group with three singles on the Japanese Oricon yearly chart in 1988.

Johnny & Associates played an integral role in the post-war growth of Japanese boy bands and the idol industry. While there were idols since the 1970s who were able to sing and dance at the same time, the agency popularized the idea of performance-oriented idols in the 1980s. Kitagawa himself was credited with pioneering the idol system where trainees (known as Johnny Jr.) are admitted into the agency at a young age to train in singing, dancing, and acting until their debut.

=== 1990–2009 ===
Around the 1990s, Johnny & Associates' marketing strategy changed to include variety show hosting as a specialty in their talents. At the time, the agency focused on marketing the singing and dancing talents of their acts until they would retire around age 25 as they aged out of the industry. Taking note of former Shibugakitai member Hirohide Yakumaru's success as an MC on Hanamaru, Johnny & Associates subsequently trained their more recent groups to have public personas as well.

During the 1990s Johnny & Associates began declining nominations from the Japan Record Awards and the Japan Academy Awards, partly due to a dispute about the musical genre of one of their groups at the 32nd Japan Record Awards. Another reason cited was that the nominations would engender competition among Johnny groups and with other nominees.

In 1997 the agency founded a record label, Johnny's Entertainment. Starting in 1996, the agency also began hosting a New Year's Eve countdown concert known as Johnny's Countdown Live broadcast live on Fuji TV from the Tokyo Dome with a different theme each year.

In 2006, Oricon sued journalist Hiro Ugaya when he was quoted in a Cyzo magazine article suggesting that the company manipulated its statistics to benefit certain management companies and labels (specifically, Johnny & Associates). Ugaya condemned the action as a strategic lawsuit against public participation, and it was later dropped by Oricon with no charges filed against the journalist.

In 2007, a temporary Johnny's Jr. group, Hey! Say! 7, broke a record as the youngest male group to ever top Oricon charts, with an average age of 14.8 years. Later that year, Hey! Say! JUMP broke a record as the largest group to debut in Johnny's history, with ten members.

By 2008, Johnny & Associates was known as the "top 3" recording artist companies.

=== 2010–2023 ===
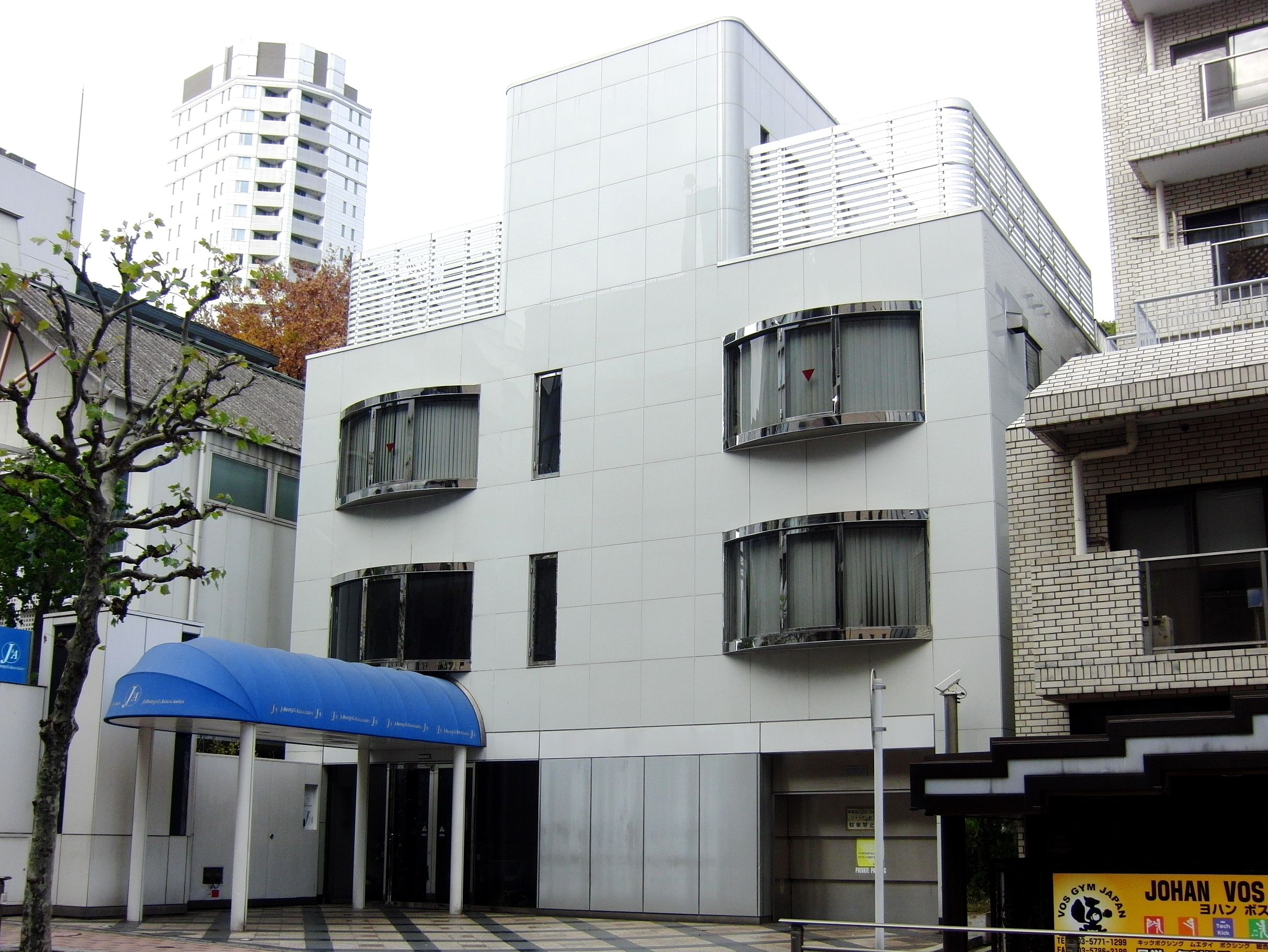
Headquarters in Minato, Tokyo (1998–2018)

On November 19, 2010, Masahiko Kondo received the Best Vocal Performance award at the 52nd Japan Record Awards; Kondo was the first Johnny recipient since Ninja refused to perform live at the 1990 awards.

On September 18, 2011, Kitagawa received Guinness World Record awards for the most number-one singles (232) and the most concerts (8,419 from 1974 to 2010) produced by an individual. His shows have been attended by an estimated 48,234,550 people.

In 2016, SMAP, which had been active for 30 years and was called a nationally popular group, suddenly broke up. The reason was said to be a feud between the female manager Michi Iijima in charge and Mary Yasuko Fujishima, who was an executive at the office, a sister of Johnny Kitagawa. Iijima later established a new company, and the three members who left the office belonged to her company. (Note: For some time after this, the three who resigned from Johnny's were unable to get jobs, and in July 2019, the Fair Trade Commission issued a warning to the Johnny's for allegedly pressuring them not to appear on TV, which could violate the Antimonopoly Act (Japan).)

In 2018, Johnny & Associates, especially Kitagawa, who had been previously known for strictly controlling access to their acts, established a YouTube channel for their trainee groups, Johnny's Jr. In January 2019, Hideaki Takizawa was named the president of a new subdivision of the company called Johnny's Island, where he would manage and oversee the debut of trainee group Snow Man. After Kitagawa's death on July 9, 2019, his niece, Julie Keiko Fujishima was made the new president of the agency, while Takizawa and Suguru Shirahase became the vice presidents and Kitagawa's older sister, Mary Yasuko Fujishima, became the executive director. However, Mary Yasuko Fujishima died on August 14, 2021.

After that, Johnny & Associates made their discography available on streaming platforms and opened social media accounts. On November 1, 2022, Takizawa resigned from his position as vice president and departed from Johnny & Associates. Yoshihiko Inohara, a former member of V6, replaced Takizawa as vice president.

On 4 September 2023 it was announced that Julie Fujishima would step down as president of the company and Noriyuki Higashiyama would become president.

=== 2023: Company rebranding ===
Logo used beginning October 2023.

In the wake of continuing sexual abuse allegations directed against Kitagawa, who died in 2019, his niece, Julie Keiko Fujishima, stepped down as president in September 2023. On October 2, 2023, Johnny & Associates announced that they would be splitting into two entities: Smile-Up, a firm focused on reparations for Kitagawa's sexual abuse cases, and Starto Entertainment, a talent agency managing existing acts under Johnny & Associates.

Starto Entertainment, which takes the place of the entertainment side of Johnny's, started activities in April 2024, with an all-agency concert series, with Arashi's Jun Matsumoto and Super Eight's Tadayoshi Okura as co-directors. Groups Timelesz, Super Eight and West. performed before their fans soon after their respective name change. Under the name of "We are! Let's get the party STARTO!!", the concert series took place over three days, in Tokyo Dome on April 10 and at Kyocera Dome Osaka on May 29 and 30, with appearances of NEWS, Super Eight, KAT-TUN, Hey! Say! JUMP, Kis-My-Ft2, Timelesz, A.B.C-Z, WEST., King & Prince, SixTones, Snow Man, Naniwa Danshi and Travis Japan.

== Charity activities ==
=== J-Friends ===
In 1998, Johnny's groups KinKi Kids, V6 and Tokio, formed a special charity-oriented group called J-Friends, to raise funds for the 1995 Hanshin and Awaji earthquake victims. The group continued with several activities, until their disbandment in 2003.

=== Marching J ===
The agency continued its fundraising project, now with Marching J, for the Tōhoku earthquake victims in 2011. Its first event was held on April 1–3. Hey! Say! JUMP, SMAP, Tokio, KinKi Kids, V6, Arashi, Tackey and Tsubasa, NEWS, Kanjani8, KAT-TUN and Johnny's Juniors participated in the fundraiser, which included talk sessions and a cappella performances. The agency planned to hold one fundraiser per month for a year. The next event, a baseball tournament featuring Johnny's Jrs., was held on May 29. Johnny & Associates cancelled or postponed 18 concerts, including shows by Tomohisa Yamashita and Tackey & Tsubasa. Generators, trucks and 2,000 litres (530 US gal) of gasoline which would have been used at the concerts were donated to the relief effort.

=== Smile-Up Project ===
Charity activities continued as Johnny's "Smile Up! Project". On May 13, 2020, it was reported that 76 of Johnny's artists from 15 groups, including V6, Arashi, News and others, would be included in the temporary unit "Twenty Twenty", as part of Johnny's charity project with support activity to prevent the spread of COVID-19. This group sang the song "Smile", written by Mr. Children's Kazutoshi Sakurai, which was released as a single in digital form on June 22, and on CD on August 12. Yuya Tegoshi was taken off the grouping, due to reports of his failing to keep orders to stay at home during the emergency situation in April. Later on, it was revealed that his contract had been terminated, and that he had left the company.

Activities continued on the end-of-year period with a new awareness campaign against COVID-19 and the flu, starting on November 24. "Aitsu", the new project, revolves around a series of movies continuing the health measure awareness used from the beginning of the pandemic, like the correct form of washing hands, the continuous use of a mask, among others. The movies were distributed around Japan and were included in the Smile Up! Project's social network accounts.

Even in the middle of the turmoil surrounding the agency, as Smile Up, they posted a new charity event to help out the people affected in the Noto Peninsula earthquake that happened as 2024 rolled in. On January 4, the company announced through its official website that it would set up donation boxes at concert and theater performance venues where its artists would perform, and its XXXXX Pop Up Stores in Shibuya, Nagoya, Osaka and Fukuoka, in order to support the victims. "By conducting this fundraising campaign as part of "Smile Up! Project", we aim to provide continued support. The entire SMILE-UP Group sincerely prays for the earliest possible recovery and reconstruction so that everyone affected by the disaster can return to their normal lives." One day later, they also posted information on the donation of 50 million yen to the Noto Peninsula Earthquake Disaster Relief Fund.

=== Charity activities as Starto ===
Starto Entertainment continued the charity projects as part of their 2024 activities, with the single "We are", sung by the special unit "STARTO for you", formed by 75 members of 14 groups. The single was released in digital form on April 10, and as CD on June 12, with sales of the single going to Noto Earthquake relief funds. Additional information is expected to be released at a later date.

As of June 5, 2024, the "Smile-Up Project" is no longer, being reborn under the name "Mindful", for which a new company has been established. General Incorporated Association "Mindful" will take over the charity activities, as well as other social contribution activities, like mental health care (which includes the support for sexual assault victims), enrollment support for higher education students in the Nursing field, and others.

== Views and controversies ==
=== Accessibility to talents ===
The business model of Johnny & Associates has an agency at the center in most areas in which it operates; the company has had its own recording, publishing, producing, filmmaking, merchandising, and advertising arms, a vertical integration that parallels Japanese keiretsu system, and for most of its history transmitted information directly to fans exclusively through the Family Club, a tightly controlled, membership-based platform on which its artists and their fans can communicate and share information with each other. During the 20th century, the F.C. was largely maintained through mail and fax.

Johnny & Associates has exercised strict control over their talent's likeness, to the point where photographs were initially not even posted on the company's official website and silhouettes were used in place of actual imagery on official websites of films and television in which the talent appeared. The agency began changing their stance on posting photos of their talent on different sites around 2007, with the agency, as well as the fans, keeping a vigilant watch on what was shared, with the latter alerting people against doing it because of the possible consequences. Official events, such as the naming of Hideaki Takizawa as "Japan-UAE Goodwill Ambassador" in 2017, saw full view photographs shared online, while the agency's paid subscription services, like Johnny's Web, shared digital content in limited quantities. While some of the initial "photos" were life-like drawings or paintings, a small amount of authentic photos where being shared by some drama and other TV program websites, with the usage permit for these being cleared, as in the case of SMAP's Goro Inagaki's drama, for example. Even singer Hikaru Utada felt the pressure of Johnny's policy about their artists' photos, when she deleted a photo of an uchiwa fan with the face of Arashi's Sho Sakurai that she had posted on her blog, substituting it with a hand-drawn teddy bear and a written message, and later, with a hand-drawn version of the fan. Apparently, one of the events that started the movement to freeing the images of Johnny's idols online, was NHK's 2009 Kōhaku Uta Gassen, as the agency reached an agreement with the network to air the program in a paid on demand format.

In January 2018, Johnny & Associates lifted their photo ban completely and allowed the press to post approved images of their talent more freely. In March 2018, Johnny & Associates launched a YouTube channel for selected Johnny's Jr. groups. Since Kitagawa's death in 2019, Johnny & Associates have expanded accessibility for their talent. This includes the opening of an official Twitter account for itself (which shares information about Johnny's talent, mostly in English), as well as different social media accounts for the artists.

=== Sexual abuse cases ===
==== Original allegations and 2001 lawsuit ====
Several former acts from Johnny & Associates, including former Four Leaves member Koji Kita in 1988 and former Johnny Jr.'s member Junya Hiramoto in 1996, alleged that Johnny Kitagawa had been sexually abusing several boys at the agency in their books. In 2001, Shūkan Bunshun ran a series of similar sexual harassment allegations along with claims that Kitagawa had allegedly forced the boys to drink alcohol and smoke. Johnny & Associates sued Shukan Bunshun for defamation, and in 2002, the Tokyo District Court ruled in favor of Kitagawa, awarding him ¥8.8 million in damages. In 2003, the fine was lowered to ¥1.2 million on the basis that the drinking and smoking allegations were defamatory, while the sexual harassment claims were not. Kitagawa filed an appeal to the Supreme Court of Japan. It was rejected in 2004. The case saw minimal coverage in Japan, with many journalists attributing it to Kitagawa's influence on Japanese mass media.

==== 2023 BBC documentary and new claims ====
On March 7, 2023, the BBC released a documentary centered on the sexual harassment claims against Kitagawa titled Predator: The Secret Scandal of J-Pop. In response, Johnny & Associates released a statement stating that they were working on creating "transparent organizational structures" that will be announced later in the year. Due to the release of the documentary, reports from books and magazines dated back to the 1960s began to surface, with the first report appearing in Weekly Sankei's 29 March 1965 issue.

A follow-up program by the BBC aired in 2024, called Our World: The Shadow of a Predator. On April 25, Smile Up sent the BBC a letter protesting the editing of Higashiyama's words in the interview included in the program, as well as demanding a correction and apology for the problems caused by it to both Higashiyama and the victims who agreed to be interviewed. On May 3, 2024, the BBC refuted Smile-up's claims via X.

===== The new claims =====
On April 12, 2023, musician and former Johnny's Jr. member Kauan Okamoto claimed Kitagawa had abused him since he was 15, and that he was not the only victim. As a response, Johnny & Associates stated they were working on transparency from within company and were working with their affiliates, to ensure thorough compliance with laws and strengthen organizational governance. The presidents of television networks Fuji TV, NHK, TV Asahi, and Nippon TV all stated in press conferences that they did not tolerate any kind of sexual violence and were conducting internal investigations. The networks continued to work with talent from Johnny & Associates.

On May 14, 2023, Johnny Kitagawa's niece and company head Julie Keiko Fujishima issued an apology to all talent who had been allegedly sexually abused by Kitagawa and claimed not to know any other information. She stated was committed to implementing measures addressing the victim's needs. In the following days, more victims came out stating Kitagawa abused them, including former Johnnys Jr. Yasushi Hashida and former Kis-My-Ft2 member Kyohei Iida, the latter saying he left his group due to being repeatedly sexually assaulted.

As of 2 October 2023, 478 people reportedly have claimed to have been victimized by Kitagawa and 325 of them sought compensation. Only 150 have been confirmed to have been part of the company. Updated numbers as of 16 February, mention 957 claimants, 282 notified of the details of compensation, 246 have accepted the details, and 201 have been paid. An independent investigation established by Johnny & Associates reported its findings on August 29, 2023, saying that Kitagawa repeatedly committed sexual abuse from the early 1970s until the mid-2010s. Johnny & Associates held a press conference on September 7 to formally acknowledge Kitagawa's abuse for the first time, while Fujishima resigned as CEO to assume the position as a representative director. Former Johnny's talent Noriyuki Higashiyama took over as CEO. As a response to the investigation's findings, several companies cancelled their contracts with entertainers from Johnny & Associates, including Tokio Marine Nichido, Asahi Group, and Japan Airlines.

On 31 October 2024, Bunshun reported that a man had claimed to have been assaulted by Kitagawa inside the NHK's restroom when he was auditioning for a program when he was in high school. According to reports, his claims were not clear, as he failed to prove them and provide full information. Smile-Up filed a lawsuit against him, claiming they did not have a reason to compensate him. The result of the lawsuit, filed in Chiba, was that Smile-Up did not have to pay.

==== Broadcaster response ====
This led to a particularly divided response among the broadcasters. NHK restricted and cancelled artists appearances, while the four commercial broadcasters with numerous regular programs are taking a flexible stance, allowing the talent to continue appearing on their programs, keeping a close eye on the response from their offices.

===== NHK =====
On 8 September 2023, NHK, the Japanese public broadcaster, said in a statement that they took the matter seriously, and that they would "work harder to ensure that human rights are more respected in the broadcasting industry" when it comes to using performers who best fit program content and production. The public broadcaster added that it did not fully acknowledge the sexual abuse matter despite various weekly magazine articles about the allegations and a Tokyo High Court ruling in 2004. A few weeks later, NHK announced that it would suspend new contracts with Johnny's performers–including for their annual New Year's Eve television special Kōhaku Uta Gassen–until the company has implemented compensation and recurrence prevention measures. In February 2024, the company announced a strict policy of terminating the appearance of talents formerly affiliated with Johnny & Associates on its programs and not allowing them to appear on new programs after FY2024. In October 2024, NHK Chairman Nobuo Inaba announced at a regular press conference that, he had confirmed efforts of Smile-Up to compensate victims and prevent recurrence and the separation of management from Starto Entertainment is steadily progressing, and that requests to perform–including Kōhaku Uta Gassen for current Starto celebrities would resume. Commercial broadcasters had already announced on the resumption of new appointments to celebrities belonging to Starto.

====== Fuji Television ======
On September 7, 2023, Fuji Television Hideaki Tatematsu, head of the programming and production bureau, responded, “There was no problem with the talent on the program, so we will continue to cast the talent as before. At a regular press conference on September 29, President Koichi Minato stated that sexual assault is unacceptable and asked the company to consider changing the name of the company and separating the company in charge of victim relief from the company in charge of managing the talent. Regarding the future use of the talent belonging to the company in programs, President Minato said, “We will make an appropriate decision while confirming that measures for victims are being steadily implemented. At a regular press conference on February 16, 2024, Toru Ota, the managing director, said, "We have heard that compensation for victims is progressing and that the new company, Starto Entertainment, will officially begin operations in April. For our part, we are willing to cast new talent from the former Johnny's if the compensation issue is progressing".

====== TBS Television ======
20 September 2023, TBS Television (Japan) President Takashi Sasaki stated, “We will continue to closely monitor trends in the improvement of the human rights environment (on the part of Johnny & Associates),” and added, “In the meantime, there will be no change in the current contracted talent who are performing in the future. We will continue to monitor the situation closely,” he said. Regarding future appointments, he said, “We will make an appropriate decision while keeping a close eye on how the Johnny's will improve human rights and how it will make steady progress in this area. On March 5, 2024, they held a briefing for the press on the April programming lineup and said that it would “continue to solemnly continue” the use of talent belonging to Smile-Up. (formerly Johnny & Associates).

====== TV Asahi ======
On September 26, 2023, Hiroshi Shinozuka, president of TV Asahi, announced that he had asked the office to consider changing the company name, compensate the victims, and take thorough measures to prevent recurrence. He also stated that he did not believe that there was any problem with the talent himself regarding his appearance on the program, and explained that there would be no change in the policy of making a comprehensive judgment based on the program's planned content. On March 8, 2024, a briefing on the April reorganization was held, at which Director General Akihiro Okukawa and General Manager Taichi Kono of the Content Organization Bureau took the stage. They said, "We are not aware of any problems with the talent, so we will continue to make a comprehensive judgment based on the content of the project as we have in the past. I believe that Smile-Up. is in charge of compensating the victims, but I would like to ask that you continue to proceed with this matter in good faith and as quickly as possible. We will continue to monitor the situation closely and continue our dialogue with the office".

====== Nippon TV ======
On September 25, 2023, Nippon TV president Akira Ishizawa announced that the company had made a verbal request to Johnny's to change the name of the company and reform the organization. He also made a request in writing for the implementation of measures to prevent recurrence and to create an environment that facilitates the activities of the talents belonging to the company, claiming that relief measures for victims are inadequate. At a press conference on November 27, President Ishizawa revealed that regarding the policy of appointing talents to programs, Executive Director Hiroyuki Fukuda expressed his basic opinion, "We will reconsider once we confirm the progress of the case and the response of the other party, but we will not make any new casting or booking in the absence of such a confirmation". On the other hand, regarding the continued use, he said, seeking understanding, “We have also confirmed that Smile-Up is making progress in dealing with the victims. We may have a different way of thinking than NHK.” At the regular press conference on April 22, 2024, President Akira Ishizawa explained that he is continuing dialogue with both Smile-Up and Starto Entertainment. He said that CEO Atsushi Fukuda visited Nippon TV December of the previous year. He then stated that he was aware that the production site had entered the stage of considering new appointments of talents after receiving reports that the situation was progressing steadily.

==== Establishment of the Victim Relief Committee ====
On 13 September 2023 was announced on the official site the establishment of the Victim Relief Committee & compensation reception desk. The Victim Relief Committee will be entrusted with determining the amount of compensation based on the contents of the declarations made by the victims, as said on the announcement. The committee is composed of three lawyers with no ties to Johnny's Office, nor to the victims seeking compensation. On 2 October, an external Chief Compliance Officer (CCO) will be appointed to formulate and implement basic policies on human rights and develop internal rules. According to the site, the agency plans to announce more specific measures based on the recommendations of the Special Team for Recurrence Prevention. In addition, the agency promised to not receive remuneration for the talent's program and commercial advertisement appearances for one year, with all income going directly to the artist.

===== Compensation information =====
As of August 14, 2026, Smile–Up had received 1044 claims, of which 226 people had not responded. Of the remaining 818 people, 816 have been notified of the compensation details by the Victim Relief Committee people: 585 people for compensation, 231 people that there will be no compensation. For the remaining 2, investigation is still under way.

==== Lawsuit against Smile-Up, and the counterlawsuit ====
Two ex-Johnny's members filed a lawsuit in U.S. for 300 million dollars over sexual assault. Junya Tanaka, 43, and Kyohei Iida, 37, filed a lawsuit in Clark County, Nevada. According to the lawsuit, Tanaka, then 15, had accompanied Kitagawa to Las Vegas in 1997, when he was molested by Kitagawa in the hotel. Iida claimed the same happened to him in 2002. Smile-Up responded that they would proceed, consulting their lawyers in the U.S. In February 2025, Smile-Up filed their own lawsuit against the two, and two other claimants. Smile-Up's lawsuit said the three victims' refusal to accept the framework should absolve the company of paying compensation to them. For the other victim, the company is seeking confirmation that it has no obligation to pay more than the amount of compensation offered by the relief committee. Tanaka and Iida held a press conference on February 6. At the news conference, Tanaka emphasized that Smile-Up's lawsuit was filed shortly after it became clear that the company had been sued in the United States. Yuko Atsumi, a lawyer representing the victims, said Smile-Up is unilaterally imposing its own framework on the victims. She also said the lawsuit could be a means of preventing victims from taking legal action in the United States. A representative of Smile-Up told The Asahi Shimbun that the company intends to proceed with compensation payments in accordance with decisions of the victims relief committee. In November 2024, the company sued Shimon Ishimaru, 57, former deputy chief of the Johnny's Sexual Assault Victims Association, dissolved in September 2024. The company is seeking confirmation that it does not have to pay more than 18 million yen in damages to Ishimaru, the figure proposed by the victims relief committee.

Regarding the Shimon Ishimaru lawsuit, on February 13, a trial started at the Saitama District Court in which SMILE-UP. filed a request for confirmation of non-existence of debt. Ishimaru had asked Smile-Up for compensation of about 1.8 billion yen, but Smile-Up offered 18 million yen. The difference between both remained unresolved, and Smile filed a civil suit to confirm that Ishimaru's liability for multiple damages did not exceeded 18 million yen. At the first oral argument held in December last year, Ishimaru asked for compensation of about 180 million yen, a midpoint between the two amounts. On that day, he was preparing for his argument, and the judge questioned him about the evidence he had submitted so far, and asked him to submit additional documents. Preparations for the next hearing will be held behind closed doors, followed by public oral arguments. Revising the case, after the court asked Ishimaru to submit a breakdown of the original claim amount, he decided to request 2.2 billion yen. Ishimaru said, "I was willing to go down to 180 million yen if they were willing to negotiate", but when the negotiations broke down, I decided to claim the full amount". Regarding the difference between the original claim and the revised amount, Ishimaru said that he was only considering adding the legal costs, which could amount to about 400 million yen.

=== Media blacklisting investigation ===
For years, Johnny & Associates has been suspected of having connections with the mass media to produce extensive and favorable coverage on the company, its acts, and Kitagawa, while reducing coverage on anything perceived to be a threat to their image and sales. An example noted by journalists mention that Kitagawa would threaten to withdraw his talent from certain music programs and channels if they provide unfavorable coverage or invite competing boy bands from other agencies.

On July 18, 2019, Johnny & Associates was investigated by the Fair Trading Commission for potentially violating the Anti-Monopoly Act due to accusations of pressuring the media to reduce coverage on Atarashii Chizu, a group made up of former SMAP members Shingo Katori, Tsuyoshi Kusanagi, and Goro Inagaki. Despite lack of hard evidence, Johnny & Associates received a warning.

==== Press conference reporter blacklisting ====
On October 2, 2023, during a press conference addressing sexual assault allegations Johnny & Associates staff were videorecorded holding documents with lists labelled "NG (no good) Reporters," with at least 6 portrait photos and their corresponding seat numbers. According to the NHK the documents were brought in by FTI Consulting, a United States-based consulting company hired by Johnny & Associates to manage the press conference, to blacklist specific media reporters. During the conference each media outlet was allowed one question after being picked by the moderator.

On October 4, 2023, Johnny & Associates denied involvement, stating "No one from our company has seen anything." Inohara on seeing the blacklist during a rehearsal meeting between Johnny & Associates and FTI Consulting staff reportedly pushed back, saying "What does this mean? It's no good if we don't call on everyone." On October 5, 2023, Johnny & Associates issued a press release stating a media blacklist was never produced nor requested by their staff. When asked to issue an apology FTI Consulting allegedly countered that they can only do so once it is cleared by their main office in the US.

On October 5, 2023, FTI Consulting admitted the existence of the 'blacklist' as well as a candidate list of "preferable" reporters. According to the firm the lists were given to the conference moderator. Mutual concerns over reporters who could spend long periods of time talking about their own opinions, or ask thoughtless questions (or remarks) that could be unnecessarily stressful, painful, and/or uncomfortable to the victims who are watching the conference was given as a reason to create the blacklist. Contradicting Johnny & Associates' claims FTI stated both parties confirmed their policy on conducting the press conference.

The press conference attracted criticism from journalists, broadcasters, and politicians at a time when Johnny & Associates was attempting to mend its public image and relationship with the media. Arc Times editor Toshihiko Ogata (Note: Arc Times is a YouTube-based organization, with Toshihiko Ogata and Isoko Mochizuki as its members, but they were conspicuous by their lack of manners at the press conference. At the October 2 press conference, Ogata, as did Mochizuki, without being appointed, forced questions without a microphone, causing an uproar in the audience.) who was attending commented "As expected, it was a rigged press conference. We also got ahold of this list and are waiting for a formal response. I think it's amazing that the NHK was able to capture that footage." Shūkan Bunshun journalist Ryūtarō Nakamura commented "This is a total out. With this it's obvious that their unscrupulous ways haven't changed. 'We didn't know' or 'a third-party was responsible' is not valid.

At the September 7 press conference attended by Noriyuki Higashiyama, Yoshihiko Inohara, and former president Julie Keiko Fujishima attracted a great deal of public attention and was broadcast live on almost all television stations in the afternoon. The total household viewership of NHK and four commercial broadcasters in the Kanto region, where the press conference was broadcast, exceeded 20%. At this high-profile press conference, Tokyo Shimbun reporter Isoko Mochizuki, who is said to have been on the blacklist, persistently asked Noriyuki Higashiyama if he himself had been a victim of sexual assault.

Sociologist Noritoshi Furuichi complained about the question, saying that this was an act of outing in public and an extremely ugly comment based on onlookers' guts that could lead to second rape. Furuichi also criticized the Tokyo Shimbun, saying that if the newspaper is supposed to be a media outlet that respects human rights, but is allowed to violate the human rights of individuals for the sake of the greater good as “that's what reporters do,” then it is no different from the Japanese media during World War II.

== Company renaming ==
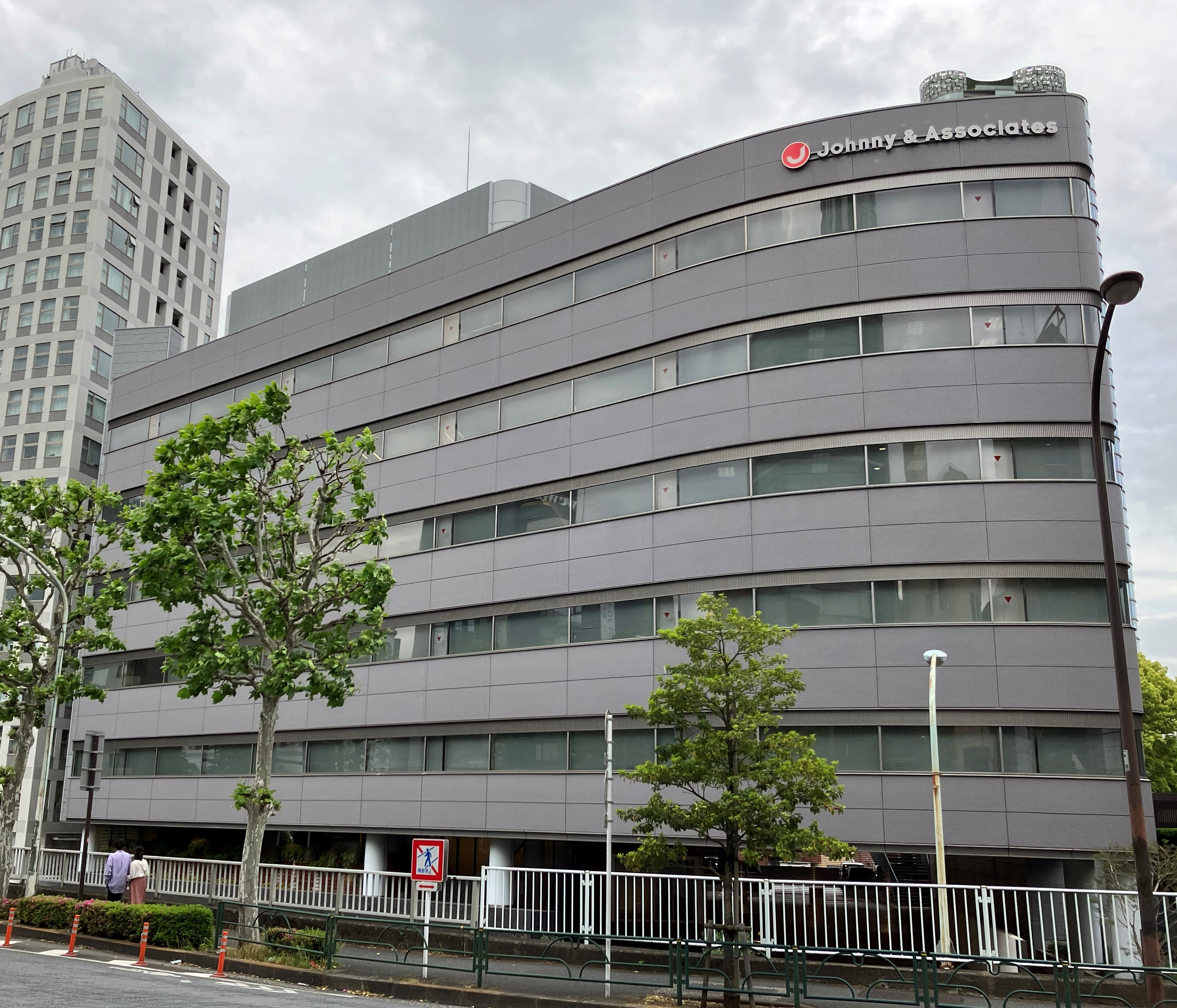
Headquarters in Minato, Tokyo (2018-present) prior to the renaming. It was SMEJ's Nogizaka Building (2001-2018) and still houses Sony Music Studios Tokyo on the basement levels.

Several Japanese news outlets reported on October 1, 2023 that Johnny & Associates was considering creating a new company to manage its performers, while the current Johnny & Associates would change its name and continue to exist for the purpose of compensating abuse victims. It was also reported that Noriyuki Higashiyama, who became the head of Johnny & Associates after the resignation of Julie K. Fujishima, was also expected to head the new company. On October 2, Johnny & Associates held a press conference to outline their plans, announcing that they would be renaming the current company to Smile Up–taking a name that they had used in their 2020 charity project–effective October 17. Smile Up will continue to exist under the ownership of Fujishima and will eventually close down once all sexual abuse compensation requests, which numbered 325 at the time of the announcement, have been processed. On November 22, 2023 the company began to compensate the first 35 victims of the sexual harassment scandal while Smile-Up! received reports from 834 people until November 22, 2023 claiming to be harassed by Kitagawa.

Higashiyama told reporters that performers working under the new, yet-to-be-named management company "will have the freedom to pursue their own career paths without being restricted or entirely dependent on the company." It was also announced that anything bearing the name "Johnny", such as related companies and company sections like Johnny's Island and J-Storm and performing groups such as Johnny's West and Kanjani Eight, would undergo changes to remove any trace of the Johnny's name. Higashiyama said that "all things with the Johnny's name will have to go," while Fujishima, who did not attend the October 2 press conference, said that she wanted to "erase all that remains of Johnny from this world."

It was revealed on December 8, 2023, that the new artist management company would be called "Starto Entertainment", a name fusing the word "star" and the hiragana と (to), with the meaning for the latter to be "toward the future". The name of the new company was decided after reviewing 140,156 fan applications. Higashiyama was to replace Fujishima in both the new artist management company, as well as in the presidency of the original, but Higashiyama declined the role in the new one. Atsushi Fukuda, president of a consulting company, was appointed as president of Starto.

On September 28, 2026, Higashiyama offered a press conference regarding his stepping down as president on the 30, due to the culmination of his term.

== Trainees ==
Trainees under the former company name of Johnny & Associates were known as Johnny's Jr. and have traditionally performed on Johnny's related variety shows and as backup dancers for the agency's groups. However, in recent years select Junior groups have taken on levels of visibility akin to mainstream senior acts, including national commercial sponsorships, solo concerts, national tours, and starring film and television roles.

=== Notable trainees ===
- HiHi Jets (ja) - formed 2015
- Bi Shonen (美 少年) - formed 2016
- 7 Men Samurai - formed 2018
- Shonen Ninja (少年忍者) - formed 2018
- SpeciaL (ja) - formed 2018
- Go!Go!Kids (ja)- formed 2022
- Lil Kansai (Lil かんさい) - formed 2019
- Boys be (ja) - formed 2020
- AmBitious (ja)- formed 2021

== Former artists ==
=== Former recording artists ===
- Johnnys (1962–1967)
  - Hiromi Maie (1962–?)
  - Osami Iino (1962–1968)
  - Ryo Nakatani (1962–?)
  - Teruhiko Aoi (1962–1967)
- Four Leaves (1968–1976)
  - Kōji Kita (1966–1989)
  - Takashi Aoyama (1966–1978)
  - Toshio Egi (1966–?)
  - Masao Orimo (1966–?)
  - Eiji Nagata (1966–1977)
- Hiromi Go (1971–1975)
- Teruyoshi Aoi (1973–1976)
- Jo Toyokawa (1975–1979)
- Little Gang (1975–1976)
- Mayo Kawasaki (1976–1989)
- Masahiko Kondō (1977–2021)
- Toshihiko Tahara (1979–1994)
- Ippei Hikaru (1980–1985)
- Shibugakitai (1982–1988)
  - Hirohide Yakumaru
  - Toshikazu Fukawa
  - Masahiro Motoki
- Shigeyuki Nakamura (1982–1993)
- The Good-Bye (1983–1990)
- Hikaru Genji (1987–1995)
  - Mikio Ôsawa (1982–1994)
  - Kazumi Morohoshi (1984–1994)
  - Hiroyuki Satō (1983–1994)
  - Junichi Yamamoto (1986–2002)
  - Akira Akasaka (Note: Akasaka was arrested for drug possession on October 28, 2007. Johnny & Associates announced his dismissal on October 29, 2007.) (1987–2007)
- SMAP (1990–2016)
  - Katsuyuki Mori (1987–1996)
  - Goro Inagaki (1987–2016)
  - Tsuyoshi Kusanagi (1987–2016)
  - Shingo Katori (1988–2016)
  - Masahiro Nakai (1986–2020)
- Otokogumi (1988–1993)
  - Shoji Narita
  - Kazuya Takahashi
  - Koyo Maeda
- Ninja (1990–1997)
- TOKIO
  - Hiromu Kojima (1990–1994)
  - Tatsuya Yamaguchi (Note: Yamaguchi was suspended indefinitely on April 26, 2018, after he was referred to prosecutors for sexually harassing a teenage girl. On May 2, 2018, he handed his resignation letter to TOKIO's leader, Shigeru Joshima. Yamaguchi officially resigned on May 6, 2018.) (1989–2018)
  - Tomoya Nagase (1992–2021)
- V6 (1995–2021)
  - Coming Century (1995–2021)
    - Go Morita (1995–2021)
    - Ken Miyake (1993–2023)
    - Junichi Okada (1995-2023)
- Tackey & Tsubasa (2002–2018)
  - Tsubasa Imai (Note: Imai announced his departure on September 13, 2018. The announcement came with a notice of disbandment from Tackey & Tsubasa. Imai, who has Ménière's disease, will be focusing on his health.) (1995–2018)
  - Hideaki Takizawa (1995–2022)
- NEWS
  - Hironori Kusano (2001–2008)
  - Takahiro Moriuchi (2001–2003)
  - Yuya Tegoshi (2003–2020)
  - Ryo Nishikido (1997–2019)
  - Tomohisa Yamashita (1996–2020)
- KAT-TUN
  - Koki Tanaka (Note: Tanaka contract with Johnny & Associates was terminated on September 30, 2013 due to several contract violations.) (1998–2013)
  - Jin Akanishi (1998–2014)
  - Junnosuke Taguchi (1999–2016)
- Hey! Say! JUMP
  - Ryutaro Morimoto (Note: On June 27, 2011, Morimoto was suspended indefinitely for underage smoking. His profile was removed from the official Johnny & Associates website in 2012.) (2004–2011)
- Kanjani Eight
  - Ryo Nishikido (1997–2019)
  - Subaru Shibutani (2004–2018)
- Tegomass (2006–2020)
- Sexy Zone
  - Marius Yo (2011–2022)
  - Kento Nakajima (2008-2024)
- King & Prince
  - Genki Iwahashi (2010–2021)
  - Sho Hirano (2012–2023)
  - Yuta Jinguji (2010–2023)
  - Yuta Kishi (2009–2023)
- Kis-My-Ft2
  - Kyohei Iida (2001–2006)
  - Hiromitsu Kitayama (2002–2023)
- Shonentai
  - Noriyuki Higashiyama (1979–2023)
  - Kazukiyo Nishikiori (1977–2020)
  - Katsuhide Uekusa (1980–2020)
- A.B.C-Z
  - Fumito Kawai (1999-2023)

Project groups

- Johnny's Junior Special (1975)
- Tanokin Trio (1980–1983)
- J-Friends (1998) (Note: J-Friends consists of Tokio, V6, KinKi Kids, who performed as a charity group.)
- Secret Agent (2000) (Note: Secret Agent consists of Noriyuki Higashiyama and Ryo Nishikido, who performed the theme song for the drama Heisei Meoto Jawan.)
- MiMyCen (2001) (Note: MiMyCen consists of Go Morita, Ken Miyake, and Junichi Okada, who performed the theme song for the variety show MiMyCen!)
- Ya-Ya-yah (2002) (Note: MiMyCen consists of Kota Yabu, Hikaru Yaotome, Naoya Akama, Shoon Yamashita, Taiyo Ayukawa, and Masaki Hoshino, who performed the theme song for the anime Nintama Rantarō and had a variety show of the same name.)
- Toraji Haiji (2005) (Note: Toraji Haiji consists of Tsuyoshi Domoto and Taichi Kokubun, who performed the theme song for the film Fantastipo.)
- Shūji to Akira (2005) (Note: Shūji to Akira consists of Kazuya Kamenashi and Tomohisa Yamashita, who performed the theme song for the drama Nobuta wo Produce.)
- GYM (2006) (Note: GYM consists of Golf, Tomohisa Yamashita, and Mike, who performed the theme song for the Women's Volleyball games.)
- Kisarazu Cats Eye feat. MCU (2006) (Note: Kisarazu Cats Eye feat. MCU consists of Junichi Okada, Sho Sakurai, Yoshinori Okada (non-Johnny's), Tsukamoto Takashi (non-Johnny's), and Ryuta Sato (non-Johnny's), who performed the theme song for the drama Kisarazu Cat's Eye: World Series.)
- Trio the Shakiiin (2007) (Note: Trio the Shakiiin consists of Noriyuki Higashiyama, Go Morita, and Kenta Suga (non-Johnny's), who performed the theme song for the drama Kuitan.)
- Hey! Say! 7 (2007) (Note: Hey! Say! 7 consists of Yuya Takaki, Daiki Arioka, Ryosuke Yamada, Yuto Nakajima, and Yuri Chinen, who performed "Hey! Say!", the theme song for the anime Lovely Complex.)
- Matchy with Question (2008) (Note: Matchy with Question consists of Masahiko Kondo, Daijiro Yonemura, Yoshihiro Yodogawa, Kazuyori Fujiie, Akun Igo, and Daisuke Ishigaki, who performed the theme song for the anime Naruto.)
- The Shigotonin (2009) (Note: The Shigotonin consists of Noriyuki Higashiyama, Masahiro Matsuoka, and Tadayoshi Okura, who performed the theme song for the drama Hissatsu Shigotonin.)
- NYC boys (2009) (Note: NYC boys consists of Ryosuke Yamada, Yuri Chinen, Yuma Nakayama, Kento Nakajima, Fuma Kikuchi, Hokuto Matsumura, and Yugo Kochi, who performed the theme song for the Women's Volleyball games.)
- Snow Prince Gasshodan (2009) (Note: Snow Prince Gasshodan consists of Shintarō Morimoto, Shintarō Kishimoto, Reia Nakamura, Kei Kurita, Yūya Ōtsuka, Tatsuya Horinouchi, Aoi Okada, Yūki Haba, Ryō Hashimoto, Mizuki Inoue, and Aoi Chino, who performed the theme song for the film Snow Prince: Kinjirareta Koi no Melody.)
- Lands (2009) (Note: Lands consists of Jin Akanishi and Takeshi Kobayashi, who performed as a tie-in to the film Bandage.)
- Marching J (2011) (Note: Marching J consists of Tokio, V6, KinKi Kids, Hey! Say! JUMP, SMAP, Arashi, Tackey and Tsubasa, NEWS, Kanjani8, KAT-TUN and Johnny's Juniors, for a total of 83 people who performed as a charity group.)
- A.N. Jell (2011) (Note: A.N. Jell consists of Hikaru Yaotome, Taisuke Fujigaya, Yuta Tamamori, and Miori Takimoto (non-Johnny's), who performed as a tie-in to the drama Ikemen desu ne.)
- The Monsters (2012) (Note: The Monsters consists of Shingo Katori and Tomohisa Yamashita, who performed the theme song for the drama Monsters.)
- Hottake Band (2014) (Note: Hottake Band consists of Kazuya Kamenashi and Koji Tamaki, who performed the theme song for the drama Tokyo Bandwagon.)
- Jigoku-zu (2016) (Note: Jigoku-zu consists of Tomoya Nagase, Ryunosuke Kamiki (non-Johnny's), Kenta Kiritani (non-Johnny's), and Nana Seino (non-Johnny's), who performed the theme song for the film Too Young to Die! Wakakushite Shinu.)
- Kame to Yamapi (2017) (Note: Kame to YamaP consists of Kazuya Kamenashi and Tomohisa Yamashita, who performed the theme song for the drama Boku, Unmei no Hito Desu.)
- A.Y.T (2017) (Note: A.Y.T consists of Yuya Takaki, Hikaru Yaotome and Daiki Arioka from Hey! Say! JUMP, who performed the theme song for the drama Koshoku Robot.)
- Twenty Twenty (2020) (Note: Twenty Twenty consists of V6, KinKi Kids, Arashi, NEWS, Kanjani8, KAT-TUN, Kis-My-Ft2, Hey! Say! JUMP, Sexy Zone, A.B.C-Z, West (band), King & Prince, SixTones, Snow Man, Tomohisa Yamashita, a total of 75 members participated as a charity group.)
- STARTO for you (2024) (Note: STARTO for you consists of NEWS, Super eight, KAT-TUN, Kis-My-Ft2, Hey! Say! JUMP, Timelesz, A.B.C-Z, West (band), King & Prince, SixTones, Snow Man, Naniwa Danshi, Travis Japan, Ae! group a total of 75 members participated as a charity group.)

=== Former actors ===
- Nobuhiro Aoyama
- Keiichi Miyoshi (1982–1991)
- Mizuki Sano (1991–2019)
- Kazunari Ninomiya (1996–2023)
- Toma Ikuta (1996–2023)
- Shunsuke Kazama (1997–2023)
- Bunichi Hamanaka (1999–2023)
- Jun Matsumoto (1996–2024)

=== Former entertainers ===
- Tsuyoshi Domoto (1991–2024)

== See also ==
- List of record labels
- Hadaka no Shōnen
