= Japonicana =

- US cover

Studio album by Jin Akanishi
- Released: March 6, 2012
- Recorded: 2011–2012
- Genre: Pop, dance, contemporary R&B, electronic, soul, rock
- Length: 29:12 (US)
- Label: Warner Music Group

Jin Akanishi chronology
Test Drive (2011)	Japonicana (2012)	#JustJin (2013)

Singles from Japonicana
- 1. "Test Drive" Released: November 8, 2011; 2. "Sun Burns Down" Released: January 24, 2012

Alternative cover
- Japanese cover

Japonicana is the debut studio album by Japanese singer-songwriter Jin Akanishi. It was simultaneously released in the United States on March 6, 2012, both physically and in major digital stores, and day after on March 7 in Japan, by Warner Music Group.

== Background ==
On January 6, 2012, was held a sold-out concert at 12,000 seat Yokohama Arena, which was streamed live at the Grammy Museum. In the same month, on January 24 was released digital single "Sun Burns Down".

== Release ==
The album's name is a combination of Japan and America, while the last part is taken from the Spanish "a" sound, which makes a noun feminine. On his debut studio album, Akanishi collaborated with The Stereotypes and Static Revenger.

It was released in the United States and Japan in different editions. The United States physical edition compared to the digital on iTunes lacks a bonus track "Tell Me Where", while Japanese in addition have "Body Talk", "Yellow Gold" (standard), "Magnitude" (standard) and "Bass Go Boom" (limited).

== Touring ==
From March 9 to 17 was held a promotional concert tour, which started at Club Nokia in Los Angeles, and continued at Centre For Performing Arts in Vancouver, Hawaii Theatre in Honolulu, Best Buy Theater in New York City, and The Warfield in San Francisco.

In Japan from April to May was scheduled to hold 7 concerts in 5 cities including Tokyo and Osaka for a total of 70,000 people, but his further plans were abruptly cancelled due to a penalty by his own agency Johnny's Entertainment because he didn't contact his agency beforehand to report his marriage at the time.

== Chart performance ==
The album has debuted on the Oricon's daily album charts at number one, and stayed as the number two on the weekly charts, selling 69,887 copies in its first week of release. It charted for seven weeks, and with 80,331 copies sold it was the 86th best-selling album of the year in Japan.

It was certified Gold by RIAJ denoting over 100,000 shipments.

On the Billboards Japan Top Albums chart peaked at number two. On the American Billboard charts peaked at number ten on Dance/Electronic Albums charts, number thirteen on Heatseekers Albums, number two on Heatseekers Pacific, and number ten on Heatseekers Middle Atlantic chart.

== Track listing ==
United States edition
No.	Title	Length
1.	"Sun Burns Down"	3:36
2.	"California Rock" (feat. Prophet)	3:28
3.	"That's What She Said" (feat. Uffie)	3:33
4.	"Like You"	4:07
5.	"Set Love Free"	3:30
6.	"Aphrodisiac" (feat. Static Revenger)	3:42
7.	"Oowah"	3:37
8.	"Test Drive" (feat. Jason Derulo, 7th Heaven Mix)	3:37
Total length:		29:12

Japanese standard edition
No.	Title	Length
1.	"Sun Burns Down"	3:36
2.	"California Rock" (feat. Prophet)	3:28
3.	"That's What She Said" (feat. Uffie)	3:33
4.	"Like You"	4:07
5.	"Set Love Free"	3:30
6.	"Aphrodisiac" (feat. Static Revenger)	3:42
7.	"Oowah"	3:37
8.	"Test Drive" (feat. Jason Derulo, 7th Heaven Mix)	3:37
9.	"Tell Me Where" (Bonus track)	3:24
10.	"Yellow Gold" (Bonus track)
11.	"Magnitude" (Bonus track)
12.	"Body Talk" (Bonus track)

Japanese limited edition Disc 1
No.	Title	Length
1.	"Sun Burns Down"	3:36
2.	"California Rock" (feat. Prophet)	3:28
3.	"That's What She Said" (feat. Uffie)	3:33
4.	"Like You"	4:07
5.	"Set Love Free"	3:30
6.	"Aphrodisiac" (feat. Static Revenger)	3:42
7.	"Oowah"	3:37
8.	"Test Drive" (feat. Jason Derulo, 7th Heaven Mix)	3:37
9.	"Tell Me Where" (Bonus track)	3:24
10.	"Pin Dom" (Bonus track)
11.	"Bass Go Boom" (Bonus track)

Japanese limited edition Disc 2
No.	Title	Length
1.	"Sun Burns Down" (Music Video)
2.	"Making of Music Video & Behind The Scenes of Album Photo Session"
3.	"Life in L.A." (The Takeover - Complete Edition Episode)
4.	"Making of Test Drive" (The Takeover - Complete Edition Episode)
5.	"In The Studio" (The Takeover - Complete Edition Episode)
6.	"Hanging with Stereotypes" (The Takeover - Complete Edition Episode)
7.	"Behind The Scenes of Photo Session" (The Takeover - Complete Edition Episode)
8.	"The Day of Test Drive Launch" (The Takeover - Complete Edition Episode)
9.	"Making of Sun Burns Down" (The Takeover - Complete Edition Episode)

== Charts ==
Chart (2012)	Peak position
Oricon Weekly Albums	2
Billboard Japan Top Albums	2
Billboard U.S. Dance Albums	10
Heatseekers Albums	13
Heatseekers Pacific	2
Heatseekers Middle Atlantic	10
