= Bandage (song) =

Single by Lands

from the album Olympos
- Released: November 25, 2009
- Genre: Rock
- Length: 11:14 (Regular pressing); 5:36 (CD+DVD)
- Label: J Storm
- Songwriter(s): Takeshi Kobayashi
- Producer(s): Kobayashi

Lands singles chronology
"Bandage" (2009)	"Eternal" (2011)

"Bandage" is a song by Japanese rock band, Lands and serves as their debut single as well as the lead single from their debut album Olympos. The song was written and produced by composer Takeshi Kobayashi (小林 武史, Kobayashi Takeshi) and serves as the theme song of the film with the same name that stars Jin Akanishi, who plays the leader and vocalist of the fictional band. "Bandage" was released on November 25, 2009, their record label J Storm.

== Background ==
Back in November 2008, it was reported that Lands was planning on making their "real world" debut, In September 2009, it was confirmed that the band would be making their debut in the fall of 2009 with the CD release of "Bandage", which was also confirmed to be the theme song of the movie also titled, Bandage. In October, the release date of the song was announced.

== Track listing ==
All tracks are written by Takeshi Kobayashi

CD
No.	Title	Length
1.	"Bandage"	5:38
2.	"Bandage" (Backing Track)	5:36

DVD
No.	Title	Length
1.	"Bandage" (Music Video and Making)

== Chart performance ==
On the Japan Hot 100 "Bandage" debuted at number 87. The following week the song went straight to the number-one spot on the chart. It peaked at number one on the Hot Singles Sales, and number nine on the Hot Top Airplay chart. On the Oricon chart, "Bandage" claimed the number-one spot with 211,000 copies sold. In total the single has sold about 248,000 copies and has been certified Platinum by the Recording Industry Association of Japan.

== Charts ==
Chart	Peak position
Oricon Weekly Chart	1
Billboard Japan Hot 100	1

== Format ==
- CD single (JACA-5185)
- CD+DVD (JACA-5183)
