= White X'mas (KAT-TUN song) =

Single by KAT-TUN

from the album Break the Records: By You & For You
- A-side: "White X'mas"
- Released: December 3, 2008 (Japan); December 17, 2008 (South Korea)
- Recorded: 2008
- Genre: Pop
- Label: J-One Records; JACA-5125 (First Press Limited Edition); JACA-5127 (Limited Edition)

KAT-TUN singles chronology
| "DON'T U EVER STOP" (2008) | "White X'mas" (2008) | "One Drop" (2009) |

"White X'mas" is the eighth single by Japanese boy band, KAT-TUN, and their second from their fourth studio album, Break the Records: By You & For You. It was released in Japan on December 3, 2008, and became KAT-TUN's eleventh consecutive number one record and eighth number one single on the Oricon charts, respectively.

== Single information ==
The single was released in a limited capacity for the Christmas season from its release date to December 26, 2008 in two pressings. The first press edition came with a DVD featuring a short film about the making of the single's music video, the music video itself and a twenty-page photo booklet while the regular limited edition included the single's instrumental track. Both pressings featured alternate jacket artwork. The single was also made available for download via Chaku-Uta via Japanese DWANGO websites from November 19, 2008, to December 2, 2008. DWANGO also began airing a preview of the track's music video on November 19.

The single was KAT-TUN's first holiday-themed song to be released commercially, their second ballad to be released as a single since "Bokura no Machi de" in 2006 and their second consecutive single with no tie-ins to endorsements or television dramas. It is also the first KAT-TUN record to be released in South Korea, when it became available in stores on December 17, 2008. White X'mas is certified Platinum by RIAJ for shipment of 250,000 copies. In 2010, CDTV announced "Your Most Beloved Winter Songs of 2000s" ranking and White X'Mas topped the ranking.

== Promotion ==
KAT-TUN performed the song live on television for the first time on Music Station on November 21, 2008, and returned the week after on November 28 for an encore performance. M-ste also invited the group for the third consecutive week on December 5, 2008. The group also performed their song on Hey! Hey! Hey! Music Champ (on December 1), their own variety show Cartoon KAT-TUN (December 3) and Utaban (December 4). Yuichi Nakamaru paid a visit to Shounen Club on December 14 and performed the song live with NEWS' Keiichiro Koyama and Kanjani∞'s Ryuhei Maruyama as part of a special medley which included "Don't U Ever Stop" and "Lips". The group were invited to perform on NTV's "Best Artist 2009" year-end special on December 16. Other subsequent performances of the song were on the group's own variety show, Cartoon KAT-TUN, on December 24 and Music Station year-end special, Super Live, on December 26 where they sang the song as part of a medley including "Don't U Ever Stop". The last performance of the song in 2008 took place at Shounen Club Premium on December 28.

== Chart performance and sales ==
=== Sales and certifications ===
| Country | Provider | Sales | Certification |
|---|---|---|---|
| Japan | RIAJ | 291,184 | Platinum |

== Track listing ==
- Limited edition track listing

| No. | Title | Writer(s) | Length |
|---|---|---|---|
| 1. | "White X'mas" | ECO (lyrics), NAO (music & arrangement), ha-j (arrangement) | 4:52 |
| 2. | "White X'mas (Instrumental)" |

- DVD track listing
1. "White X'mas" (music video)
2. "White X'mas" (making of)
