= Love Yourself (Kimi ga Kirai na Kimi ga Suki) =

Single by KAT-TUN

from the album No More Pain
- B-side: "The D-Motion"; "Heart Beat"; "Aishiteiru Kara"; "A Page"
- Released: February 10, 2010
- Recorded: 2009
- Genre: Pop rock
- Label: J-One Records
- Songwriters: Eco, Joker, Tatsugoo
- Producer: Johnny H. Kitagawa

KAT-TUN singles chronology
"Rescue" (2009)	"Love Yourself (Kimi ga Kirai na Kimi ga Suki)" (2010)	"Going!" (2010)

"Love Yourself (Kimi ga Kirai na Kimi ga Suki)" (Love yourself ～君が嫌いな君が好き～; "Love Yourself ~I Love the You That You Hate~") is the eleventh single by Japanese boy band KAT-TUN. It was released on February 10, 2010, by their record label J-One Records. The title track was used as the theme song for the Tokyo Broadcasting System drama, Yamato Nadeshiko Shichi Henge, which stars member Kazuya Kamenashi.

== Background ==
In late December 2009, it was confirmed that the B-side of the single, "The D-Motion", would be used to promote Docotomo DX (デコとも★DX), where the group would also appear in the commercial. In the following month, it was announced KAT-TUN was to perform the theme song to member Kazuya Kamenashi's drama on TBS, Yamato Nadeshiko Shichi Henge. It was also announced that the title of the song was "Love Yourself (Kimi ga Kirai na Kimi ga Suki)" and that the song was written to convey the message of the drama.

== Single information ==
The single is released in three pressings - two different limited editions which both include a DVD featuring the single's two music videos for the title track (in Type A) and "The D-Motion" (in Type B) and a featurette of the making of the music videos respectively. The two limited edition pressings also feature two new solo songs by members Kazuya Kamenashi ("Aishiteiru Kara (愛しているから)") and Jin Akanishi ("A Page") in Type A and Type B, respectively.

== Promotion ==
On January 29, 2010, KAT-TUN performed "The D-Motion" on Music Station.

== Chart performance ==
The single sold 157,000 copies on its first day, debuting at No. 1 on the Oricon Daily Singles Chart. By the end of the week, KAT-TUN gained their eleventh consecutive number one single on the Oricon Weekly Singles Chart since their debut, selling 354,231 copies and holding the second most consecutive number one singles since debut with fellow Johnny's group, NEWS. This was KAT-TUN's first single to sell more than 350,000 copies in its first week since the May 2008 release of their single "Don't U Ever Stop," which sold more than 381,000 copies in its first week. At the end of the year, Billboard Japan announced the single as the 9th Hot Singles Sales Year End 2010.

By the end of the year, Love Yourself (Kimi ga Kirai na Kimi ga Suki) was reported by Oricon to sell 439,736 copies and was later certified Platinum by RIAJ denoting over 250,000 shipments.

== Track listing ==
Regular
No.	Title	Lyrics	Music	Length
1.	"Love Yourself (Kimi ga Kirai na Kimi ga Suki)" (Love yourself ～君が嫌いな君が好き～)	Eco, Joker	Tatsugoo
2.	"The D-Motion"	Eco, Jin Akanishi	Oscar Holter, Jakke Erixson, Thomas Haraldsson, Junior H Johansson
3.	"Heart Beat"	Shigeo, Shun	Shigeo	4:01
4.	"Love Yourself (Kimi ga Kirai na Kimi ga Suki)" (Original Karaoke オリジナル・カラオケ)
5.	"The D-Motion" (Original Karaoke オリジナル・カラオケ)
6.	"Heart Beat" (Original Karaoke オリジナル・カラオケ)

Limited Edition 1
No.	Title	Lyrics	Music	Length
3.	"Aishiteiru Kara" (愛しているから)	Kazuya Kamenashi, Satomi, Yuka Kawamura	Kawamura

Limited Edition 1 DVD
No.	Title	Length
1.	"Love Yourself (Kimi ga Kirai na Kimi ga Suki)" (Video clip + Making clip ビデオ・クリップ＋メイキング)

Limited Edition 2
No.	Title	Lyrics	Music	Length
3.	"A Page"	Josh, Akanishi	Akanishi

Limited Edition 2 DVD
No.	Title	Length
1.	"The D-Motion" (Video clip + Making clip ビデオ・クリップ＋メイキング)

== Charts and certifications ==
=== Charts ===
Chart (2010)	Peak position
Billboard Japan Hot 100	1
Billboard yearly Japan Hot 100	15
Japan Oricon Daily Singles Chart	1
Japan Oricon Weekly Singles Chart	1
Japan Oricon Yearly Singles Chart	11

=== Sales and certifications ===
Region	Certification	Certified units/sales
Japan (RIAJ)	Platinum	439,736
