= KAT-TUN III: Queen of Pirates =

Studio album by KAT-TUN
- Released: June 4, 2008
- Recorded: 2007–2008
- Genre: Pop, rock
- Length: 60:57
- Label: J-One; JACA-5099~5100 (Limited Edition); JACA-5101 (Regular Edition)
- Producer: Johnny H. Kitagawa (executive), Julie K.

KAT-TUN chronology
Cartoon KAT-TUN II You (2007)	KAT-TUN III: Queen of Pirates (2008)	Break the Records: By You & For You (2009)

Singles from KAT-TUN III: Queen of Pirates
- 1. "Yorokobi no Uta" Released: June 6, 2007; 2. "Keep the Faith" Released: November 21, 2007; 3. "Lips" Released: February 6, 2008

KAT-TUN III: Queen of Pirates is the third studio album by Japanese boy band KAT-TUN and was released in Japan on June 4, 2008 by J-One Records. The album was issued in two editions; the limited edition came with four bonus tracks, a DVD with an extended version of the music video for their 2008 single "Don't U Ever Stop" and a short film chronicling the making of the video.

KAT-TUN began issuing singles from the album nearly a year before it was released; "Yorokobi no Uta", "Keep the Faith" and "Lips" all reached number one on the Oricon singles chart. The album itself became KAT-TUN's tenth consecutive chart-topper since their debut in 2006 and was certified platinum by the Recording Industry Association of Japan in June 2008.

According to Oricon, the album is the 35th best-selling album of 2008.

== Album information ==
The album was recorded in Tokyo and at the NRG Recording Studios in Los Angeles. With the exception of Koki Tanaka who composed his own rap verses, it is the first album to not feature any songs written by KAT-TUN. The album's musical styles consist mostly of hard rock, pop and dance. KAT-TUN employed a variety of songwriters with a history of producing hit singles to helm the record. The former lead vocalist of acclaimed rock band Boøwy, Kyosuke Himuro, composed the second single "Keep the Faith" with frequent KAT-TUN collaborator, Spin. Akio Shimizu, guitarist for heavy metal band Anthem and lyricist of Tokio's 2006 number one single "Mr. Traveling Man", co-wrote "Ai no Command" with N.B.Comics. The latter penned the first single "Yorokobi no Uta". Erykah, who wrote KAT-TUN's kōhai Hey! Say! 7's 2007 number one debut single "Hey! Say!", composed the last track of the regular edition, "Nannen Tattemo". Narumi Yamamoto, the lyricist who co-wrote hit singles for Kou Shibasaki and Yuna Ito, also contributed a song to the album with the tenth track, "Our Story: Prologue"."Six Senses", a song KAT-TUN had been performing since their junior days, was also recorded for the first time and included as a bonus track.

=== Promotion ===
Tanaka, Junnosuke Taguchi, Yuichi Nakamaru and Tatsuya Ueda began playing a minute and a half long previews of several tracks of the album on their respective radio shows, KAT-TUN Style and R-One KAT-TUN, from May 21–28, 2008. The songs that were leaked were: "Taboo", "Mother/Father", "Affection: Mō Modorenai", "Hell, No", "Un" and "Distance".

== Chart performance ==
In its first week of release, KAT-TUN III -Queen of Pirates- sold 240,317 copies, a slight drop from the first-week sales of the group's second album. Despite the downward pattern of sales for KAT-TUN's studio albums, the singles from the album which were all released months in advance had already racked up over a million shipments altogether by the time the album was available in stores. KAT-TUN debuted at number 1 for the tenth consecutive time (albums and singles combined) and became one of only four groups in Japanese music history to reach this record; the others being Johnny & Associates labelmates, NEWS, KinKi Kids and the disbanded Hikaru Genji.

The album stayed on the Oricon albums chart for five weeks and has sold over 282,402 copies to date. The album was the twenty-fifth best-selling album for the first half of the year and RIAJ certified it platinum denoting more than 250,000 shipments.

== Track listing ==
1. "Taboo" (Masanco, M.Y) - 3:20
2. "Keep the Faith" (Kyosuke Himuro, Spin, Joker, Ha-j) - 3:45
3. "Affection: Mō Modorenai (Affection ～もう戻れない～)" (Soba, Erik Lidbom) - 3:34
4. "Hell, No" (Yuki Shirai, Mika Arata, Joker, Steven Lee, Joey Carbone) - 3:58
5. "Distance" (Gin.K, Erik Lidbom) - 3:08
6. "Mother/Father" (Ami, Joker, Yoshinao Mikami, A.k.a.) - 4:14
7. "Lips" (Axel-G, Joker, Yukihide "YT" Takiyama) - 4:16
8. "Yorokobi no Uta" (N.B.Comics, Joker, Zero-rock, Gin.K) - 3:59
9. "Un" (Hidenori Tanaka, Kōsuke Noma) - 4:45
10. "Our Story: Prologue (Our Story ～プロローグ～, Our Story: Purorōgū)" (Narumi Yamamoto, Erik Lidbom) - 3:47
11. "Nannen Tattemo (何年たっても)" (Erykah, Joker, Mike Rose, Masayuki Iwata) - 4:56
12. "Shot!"^{1} (Ami, Yoshinao Mikami, Dreadstore Cowboy) - 3:57
13. "12 o'clock'"^{1} (A.k.a., Joker, Mike Rose) - 4:19
14. "Ai no Command (愛のコマンド, Love's Command)"^{1} (Akio Shimizu, N.B. Comics, Joker) - 4:17
15. "Six Senses"^{1} (Joker, Yokono Kōhei, Peter Funk) - 4:39

^{1}Limited edition bonus tracks.
DVD track listing

1. "Don't U Ever Stop: Limited Edition" (Extended music video)
2. "Don't U Ever Stop" (Making of)

=== Sales and certifications ===
Country	Provider	Sales	Certification
Japan	RIAJ	282,402	Platinum

== Credits ==
Recording staff

- Producer: Julie K.
- Executive producer: Johnny H. Kitagawa
- Recording engineers: Yuji Oshima, Takashi Inoue, Teturo Takeuchi, Shigeru Tanida and Dan "mfdc" Certa
- Assistant engineers: Yoko Sato, Fumi Shinohara, Shinya Matsuo, Hiroshi Abe and Dave Colvin
- Mixing: Yuji Oshima, Teturo Takuechi and Hiroshi Yokote
- Mastering: Stephen Marcussen
- Management: Yukihide "YT" Takiyama (for Los Angeles recording staff)
- Recording studios (Tokyo): Warner Music Recording Studio, Victor Studio, Sony Studio, 603 Studio, On Air Azabu Studio, Sound City
- Recording studios (Los Angeles): NRG Recording Studios

Art staff

- Art director: Nagi Noda
- Designer: Atsushi Ishiguro
- Photographer: Shoji Uchida
- Stylists: Noriko Takahashi and Keiko Saito
- Hair & make-up: Koichi Toyofuku, Yoshinori Takeuchi, Chiemi Oshima and Asami Nemoto
- Special effects: Shinichi Wakasa and Trigon Graphics Service

Music personnel
- Performers: Kazuya Kamenashi, Jin Akanishi, Junnosuke Taguchi, Koki Tanaka, Tatsuya Ueda and Yuichi Nakamaru
- Bass: Ha-j, Billy Sheehan, Takeshi Taneda, Hitoki, Yuichi Takama and Nathan East
- Drums: Masafumi Minato, Carmine Appice, Hideo Yamaki, Simon Phillips, Koji Hasegawa, Turkey, John JR Robinson and Dave Weck
- Guitars: Yukihide "YT" Takiyama, George Lynch, Naoki Hayashibe, Rui Momota, Michael Thompson and Akio Shimizu
- Keyboards: M.Y, Ha-j, Erik Lidbom, Steven Lee, Yoshinao Mikami, Gin.K, Kousuke Noma, Masayuki Iwata, Dreadstore Cowboy, Mike Rose, Akio Shimizu and peter funk
- Programming: ha-j, Erik Lidbom, Steven Lee, A.k.a., Keita Kawaguchi, Masayuki Iwata, Dreadstore Cowboy, Mike Rose, Akio Shimizu and peter funk
- Saxophone: Ayako
- Song co-ordination: Joey Carbone
- Turn tables: Koba Da Beat
