= List of Hot 100 number-one singles of 2009 (Japan) =

This is a list of number one singles on the Billboard Japan Hot 100 chart in 2009.

Date	Song	Artist
January 5	"Stay with Me"	Kumi Koda
January 19	"Yume no Tsubomi"	Remioromen
January 26	"Velonica"	Aqua Timez
February 2	"Free"	Mao Abe
February 9	"Yakusoku"	KinKi Kids
February 16	"Wao!"	Unicorn
February 23	"One Drop"	KAT-TUN
March 2	"Milk"	Aiko
March 9	"Rule"	Ayumi Hamasaki
March 16	"Believe"	Arashi
March 23	"Rescue"	KAT-TUN
March 30	"Wild"	Namie Amuro
April 6	"One Room Disco"	Perfume
April 13	"It's All Love!"	Kumi Koda and Misono
April 20	"Niji"	Kobukuro
April 27	"Someday"	Exile
May 4	"Aitai"	Yuzu
May 11	"Koi no Abo"	NEWS
May 18	"Ashita ga Kuru Nara"	Juju and Jay'ed
May 25	"Love Forever"	Miliyah Kato and Shota Shimizu
June 1	"Keshin"	Masaharu Fukuyama
June 8	"Ashita no Kioku"	Arashi
June 15	"Again"	Yui
June 22	"Haruka"	Greeeen
June 29	"Spirit"	V6
July 6	"Tanpopo"	Yusuke
July 13	"Everything"	Arashi
July 20	"Tanabata Matsuri"	Tegomass
July 27	"Stay"	Kobukuro
August 3	"Fireworks"	Exile
August 10	"Ayakashi"	Koichi Domoto
August 17	"Ichibu to Zenbu"	B'z
August 24	"Ichibu to Zenbu"	B'z
August 31	"Yume o Arigatō"	Yuko Hara
September 7	"Sotto Kyutto"	SMAP
September 14	"Niji"	Yuzu
September 21	"Sono Sake e"	Dreams Come True featuring Fuzzy Control
September 28	"Blame It on the Girls"	Mika
October 5	"Yell"	Ikimono-gakari
October 12	"Colors (Melody and Harmony)"	Jejung and Yuchun
October 19	"It's All Too Much"	Yui
October 26	"My Lonely Town"	B'z
November 2	"Boku wa Kimi ni Koi o Suru"	Ken Hirai
November 9	"Swan Song"	Kinki Kids
November 16	"Kyū Jō Show!!"	Kanjani 8
November 23	"My Girl"	Arashi
November 30	"Loveless"	Tomohisa Yamashita
December 7	"Bandage"	Lands
December 14	"Nōdōteki Sanpunkan"	Tokyo Jihen
December 21	"Kimi ni Sayonara o"	Keisuke Kuwata
December 28	"Hatsukoi"	Masaharu Fukuyama

== See also ==
- Lists of Hot 100 number-one singles of 2009
