= Bokura no Machi de =

Single by KAT-TUN

from the album Cartoon KAT-TUN II You
- A-side: "Bokura no Machi de"
- B-side: "Way of Love, Le Ciel ~Kimi no Shiawase Inoru Kotoba~ [X'mas Remix 5 Version] (First Press CD Only)"
- Released: December 7, 2006 (Japan)
- Recorded: 2006
- Genre: Pop
- Length: 4:47
- Label: J-One Records; JACA-5048~5049 (CD+DVD Limited Edition); JACA-5050 (First Press); JACA-5051 (Regular Edition)
- Songwriter: Kazumasa Oda

KAT-TUN singles chronology
"Signal" (2006)	"Bokura no Machi de" (2006)	"Yorokobi no Uta" (2007)

"Bokura no Machi de" (僕らの街で in Japanese text, translates to "In Our City") is the third overall single by the Japanese boy band KAT-TUN, and the second from their second studio album, Cartoon KAT-TUN II You. The first ballad to be released as a single, it is also the first commercially released song to not feature Jin Akanishi who took a sabbatical from the group in October 2006 to study in Los Angeles. The single was released in three editions; a regular edition with instrumental versions of the title track and a b-side, a first press limited edition with a bonus track and its instrumental version and a limited edition with the single's music video.

It was released on December 7, 2006, and became KAT-TUN's third consecutive number 1 on the Oricon singles charts.

== Single information ==
"Bokura no Machi de" was written entirely by folk singer-songwriter Kazumasa Oda for KAT-TUN. He was an active participant in the recording studio attending each member's recording session from start to finish while providing advice for each of them. The song was featured as the ending theme song to Kazuya Kamenashi and Koki Tanaka's romance drama, Tatta Hitotsu no Koi, and as such, the lyrics correspond with the troubled relationship Kamenashi's character and his love interest (portrayed by Haruka Ayase) once shared.

== Promotion ==
KAT-TUN debuted the song on television on Utawara on December 3, 2006, and were guests on their senpai Masahiro Nakai's talk show Utaban on the day the single was released. The group performed on Music Station the day after and were invited to perform on Music Station's special end-of-year show, Super Live, on December 22 where they also performed their debut hit single, "Real Face". The group rounded off the year by performing with other Johnny's Entertainment groups on the special end-of-year countdown concert at Tokyo Dome.

On March 18, 2007, co-lead vocalist Kazuya Kamenashi was a guest on Shounen Club Premium where he collaborated with Tokio vocalist and keyboardist Tomoya Nagase and Kokubun Taichi for a one-off performance of the single. KAT-TUN also performed with Every Little Thing on their talk show Cartoon KAT-TUN on February 27, 2008, singing the title track and ELT's single, "Shapes of Love".

== Chart performance ==
In its first week of its release, the single knocked off KinKi Kids' "Harmony of December" from the top spot on the Oricon singles chart. It reportedly sold 410,103 copies and was certified as the 13th best-selling song of 2006 with those numbers alone. By the end of its chart run in early 2007, the song had reportedly sold over 558,491 copies and was later certified Double Platinum by RIAJ denoting over 500,000 shipments.

The single was honored at the 21st Japan Gold Disc Awards when it placed on the "Best 10 Singles (Domestic)" list along with "Real Face" and "Signal".

== Track listings ==
- Normal Edition

No.	Title	Writer(s)	Length
1.	"Bokura no Machi de (僕らの街で)"	Kazumasa Oda (lyrics, music & arrangement)	4:47
2.	"Way of Love"	ma-saya (lyrics), Koutaro Egami (music & arrangement)	3:41
3.	"Bokura no Machi de (僕らの街で) (Instrumental)"		4:47
4.	"Way of Love (Instrumental)"		3:41

- First Press Edition

No.	Title	Writer(s)	Length
1.	"Bokura no Machi de (僕らの街で)"	Kazumasa Oda (lyrics, music & arrangement)	4:47
2.	"Way of Love"	ma-saya (lyrics), Koutaro Egami (music & arrangement)	3:41
3.	"Le Ciel ~Kimi no Shiawase Inoru Kotoba~ (君の幸せ祈る言葉) [X'mas Remix 5 Version]"	SPIN (lyrics), Akihito (music) & ha-j (arrangement)	4:38
4.	"Le Ciel ~Kimi no Shiawase Inoru Kotoba~ (君の幸せ祈る言葉) [X'mas Remix 5 Version] (Instrumental)"		3:41

- Limited Edition

No.	Title	Writer(s)	Length
1.	"Bokura no Machi de (僕らの街で)"	Kazumasa Oda (lyrics, music & arrangement)	4:47
2.	"Way of Love"	ma-saya (lyrics), Koutaro Egami (music & arrangement)	3:41
3.	"Bokura no Machi de (music video)"

=== Sales and certifications ===
Country	Provider	Sales	Certification
Japan	RIAJ	558,491	Double Platinum
