= Yorokobi no Uta =

Single by KAT-TUN

from the album KAT-TUN III: Queen of Pirates
- A-side: "Yorokobi no Uta"
- B-side: "Your Side"
- Released: June 6, 2007 (Japan)
- Recorded: 2007
- Genre: Pop, rock
- Length: 4:02
- Label: J-One Records; JACA-5061~5062 (Limited Edition); JACA-5063 (Regular Edition)
- Songwriters: N.B.Comics, zero-rock

KAT-TUN singles chronology
"Bokura no Machi de" (2006)	"Yorokobi no Uta" (2007)	"Keep the faith" (2007)

"Yorokobi no Uta" (喜びの歌 in Japanese text, translates to "Song of Joy") is the fourth overall single by Japanese boy band, KAT-TUN, and the first from their third studio album, KAT-TUN III: Queen of Pirates. The single was released in two editions; a regular edition with the songs and its instrumental versions and a limited edition with a DVD of the music video.

It was released on June 6, 2007, and became KAT-TUN's fourth consecutive number 1 on the Oricon singles charts with more than 300,000 copies sold in its first week.

== Song information ==
"Yorokobi no Uta" was written and composed by N.B.Comics and zero-rock. Koki Tanaka penned his own rap verses whilst the track was arranged by Gin.K. Though Jin Akanishi appeared in the music video for "YOU", this song is the first official single to mark his homecoming after a six-month hiatus which he spent studying English in Los Angeles. The song was also used as the theme song for Tanaka's romantic comedy series, Tokkyu Tanaka 3 Go, which aired on TBS.

== Promotion ==
Tatsuya Ueda and Yuichi Nakamaru first performed the song live when they were guests on Shounen Club on June 3, 2007. KAT-TUN as a whole went on to debut the song on their own variety show Cartoon KAT-TUN on June 6. Other subsequent performances on television include Music Station on June 8 and again on June 22. The group also performed "Your Side" during the latter guest appearance. The song was a part of KAT-TUN's 2007 summer nationwide tour set list and can be found on "Tour 2007 cartoon KAT-TUN II You" DVD which was filmed during their last tour date at the Tokyo Dome. The song was also sung as part of a medley performance on Music Station on December 21, 2007.

== Chart performance and reception ==
In its first week of release, "Yorokobi no Uta" debuted at number 1 with 300,396 copies sold knocking off L'Arc-en-Ciel's "Seventh Heaven" from the top spot. It stayed on the charts for 5 weeks and has reportedly sold over 373,965 copies and was later certified Platinum by RIAJ denoting over 250,000 shipments.

The song was named the sixth best-selling song of 2007 by Oricon and was honored at the 22nd Japan Gold Disc Awards when it placed on the "Best 10 Music Singles (Domestic)" list alongside "Keep the faith".

== Track listing ==
- Normal Edition

No.	Title	Writer(s)	Length
1.	"Yorokobi no Uta (喜びの歌)"	N.B.Comics (lyrics), zero-rock (music), Gin.K (arrangement)	4:02
2.	"Your Side"	N.B.Comics (lyrics), Shusui, Stefan Engblom, Axel Bellinder (music), FLYING GRIND (arrangement)	3:32
3.	"Yorokobi no Uta (喜びの歌) (Instrumental)"		4:02
4.	"Your Side (Instrumental)"		3:32

=== Sales and certifications ===
Country	Provider	Sales	Certification
Japan	RIAJ	373,965	Platinum
