= Keep the Faith (KAT-TUN song) =

"Keep the faith"

Single by KAT-TUN

from the album KAT-TUN III: Queen of Pirates
- A-side: "Keep the faith"
- B-side: Crazy Love; Lovin'U (First Press CD Only)
- Released: November 21, 2007 (Japan)
- Recorded: 2007
- Genre: Rock, pop
- Length: 3:47
- Label: J-One Records; JACA-5076~5077 (CD & DVD Limited Edition); JACA-5078 (First Press Limited Edition); JACA-5079 (Regular Edition)
- Songwriters: Kyosuke Himuro, SPIN, JOKER, ha-j

KAT-TUN singles chronology
"Yorokobi no Uta" (2007)	"Keep the faith" (2007)	"LIPS" (2008)

"Keep the faith" is the fifth overall single by the Japanese boy band, KAT-TUN, and the second from their third studio album, KAT-TUN III: Queen of Pirates. It was released in three editions with three different covers; the regular edition contains all the songs and its instrumental versions, the first press edition came with a bonus track entitled "Lovin'U" and its instrumental track and the second limited edition was packaged with a DVD with the single's music video and a short film about the making of the music video.

The single was released on November 21, 2007, and was KAT-TUN's fifth consecutive number 1 on the Oricon weekly singles chart.

== Song information ==
"Keep the faith" was co-written by the former Boøwy lead vocalist and lyricist Kyosuke Himuro (who later released a cover version of the song on a 2008 compilation of his) and SPIN, a frequent songwriter for the group. Koki Tanaka also provided his own rap verses whilst ha-j arranged the track. A hard rock number, the song was used as the theme song to Jin Akanishi and Junnosuke Taguchi's school comedy series, Yukan Club, shown on NTV.

== Promotion ==
KAT-TUN first performed the song live on Music Station on November 14, 2007, and on their own late-night variety/talk show Cartoon KAT-TUN on November 21, the day the single was released. The group made their third appearance on Utaban on November 29, performed on Hey! Hey! Hey! Music Champ on December 3 and on NTV's "Best Artists 2007" special on December 11. KAT-TUN also visited Shounen Club Premium and Music Lovers on December 16 before returning to Music Station on December 21 to perform a medley of the single and "Yorokobi no Uta".

== Chart performance and reception ==
In its first week of release, "Keep the faith" debuted at number 1 with 350,863 copies sold knocking Hey! Say! JUMP's official debut single "Ultra Music Power" from the top spot. It stayed on the charts for 16 weeks and was certified as the fifth best-selling single of 2007 with total reported sales of over 459,919 units by the end of its chart-run. KAT-TUN became one of only two artists in Japanese music history to sell more than 300,000 copies of five or more consecutive singles in the first week (the other being another JE boy band and senpai, KinKi Kids).

The single was certified platinum by the Recording Industry Association of Japan in November 2007 denoting more than 250,000 shipments. The song was honored at the 22nd Japan Gold Disc Awards when it was placed on the "Best 10 Music Singles (Domestic)" list alongside "Yorokobi no Uta".

== Track listing ==
- Normal edition

No.	Title	Writer(s)	Length
1.	"Keep the faith"	Kyosuke Himuro (music & lyrics), SPIN (lyrics), JOKER (rap), ha-j (arrangement)	3:47
2.	"Crazy Love"	SPIN (lyrics), Yoshinao Mikami (music & arrangement), ha-j (arrangement)	4:36
3.	"Keep the faith (instrumental)"		3:47
4.	"Crazy Love (instrumental)"		4:36

- First press edition

No.	Title	Writer(s)	Length
1.	"Keep the faith"		3:47
2.	"Crazy Love"		4:36
3.	"Lovin'U"	kodamax (music, lyrics & arrangement)	4:56
4.	"Keep the faith (instrumental)"		3:47
5.	"Crazy Love (instrumental)"		4:36
6.	"Lovin'U (instrumental)"		4:56

- DVD

No.	Title	Length
1.	"Keep the faith (music video)"
2.	"Keep the faith (making of PV)"

=== Sales and certifications ===
Country	Provider	Sales	Certification
Japan	RIAJ	459,919	Platinum
