= List of Oricon number-one singles of 2009 =

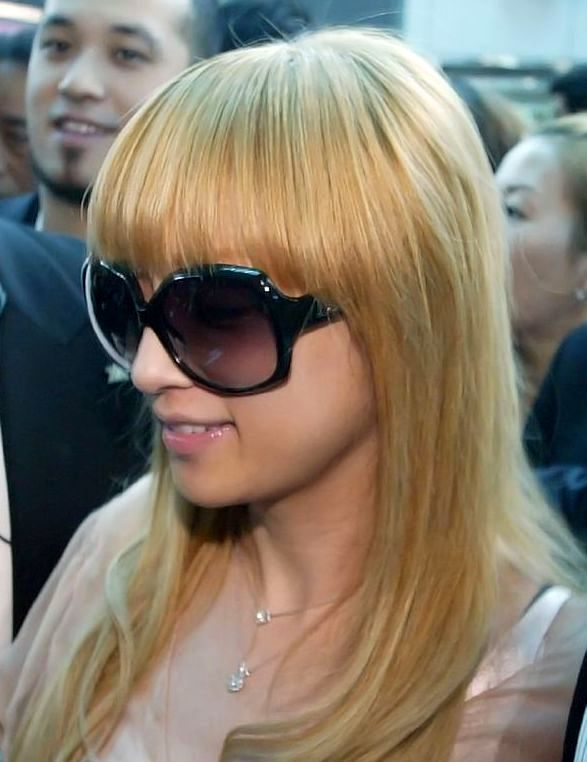
Pop singer Ayumi Hamasaki is the only solo female artist and first female artist to have 20 consecutive singles to debut at number one.

The highest-selling singles in Japan are ranked in the Oricon Weekly Chart, which is published by Oricon Style magazine. The data are compiled by Oricon based on each singles' weekly physical sales. In 2009, 51 singles reached the peak of the chart.

Sisters Kumi Koda and Misono's "It's All Love!" made them the fourth group of siblings to have a number one on the charts. However, they are the first siblings to have a number one debut on the charts in its initial week. Enka singer Junko Akimoto's "Ai no Mama de" (愛のままで, As Love Without Change) makes her the oldest singer at the age of 61 years to have a number one single. The record was previously held by Kazumasa Oda's "Kokoro" (こころ, Heart) which was released in 2007. Korean pop boy band TVXQ's "Share the World/We Are!" debut at number-one on the charts, making them first foreign artist to have six number one singles in Japan.

Rock boy band KAT-TUN's "Rescue" makes them the third group to ten consecutive number one singles since their debut. KinKi Kids' "Yakusoku" (約束, Promise) extended their record for having the most consecutive number one singles since their debut. They also extended their Oricon record for having a number one single for 13 consecutive years since their debut. Pop singer Ayumi Hamasaki's "Rule/Sparkle" makes her the only solo female artist and the first female artist to have 20 consecutive singles to debut at number one. R&B singer Namie Amuro's Wild/Dr. debuted atop of the charts and made her the only female artist to have a top ten single each year for 15 years. "Milk/Nageki no Kiss" (milk/嘆きのキス, Milk/Grief's Kiss) is Aiko's first number one single in her 11-year career.

Pop boy band NEWS' "Koi no ABO" (恋のABO, Love's ABO) makes them the second group to have 11 consecutive number one singles since their debut. Pop boy band Arashi's "Believe/Kumorinochi, Kaisei" and "Ashita no Kioku/Crazy Moon (Kimi wa Muteki)" are the first singles in seven years to sell over 500,000 copies consecutively with first week sales. This feat was last achieved by Keisuke Kuwata in 2001.

== Chart history ==
| Issue Date | Singles | Artist(s) | Reference(s) |
|---|---|---|---|
| January 12 | "Stay with Me" | Kumi Koda | |
| January 19 | "Ai Kakumei" (愛・革命, Love Revolution) | Hideaki Takizawa | |
| January 26 | "Ai no Mama de" (愛のままで, Still in Love) | Junko Akimoto | |
| February 2 | "Bolero/Kiss the Baby Sky/Wasurenaide" | TVXQ | |
| February 9 | "Yakusoku" (約束, Promise) | KinKi Kids | |
| February 16 | "Rōkyōku Ichidai" (浪曲一代, Waves of Songs) | Kiyoshi Hikawa | |
| February 23 | "One Drop" | KAT-TUN | |
| March 2 | "Milk/Nageki no Kiss" (milk/嘆きのキス, Milk/Grief's Kiss) | Aiko | |
| March 9 | "Rule/Sparkle" | Ayumi Hamasaki | |
| March 16 | "Believe/Kumorinochi, Kaisei" | Arashi | |
| March 23 | "Rescue" | KAT-TUN | |
| March 30 | "Wild/Dr." | Namie Amuro | |
| April 6 | "One Room Disco" | Perfume | |
| April 13 | "It's All Love!" | Kumi Koda x Misono | |
| April 20 | "Sora (Utsukushii Ware no Sora)" (空 ～美しい我の空, Sky ~The Beautiful Sky) | Tsuyoshi | |
| April 27 | "The Monster: Someday" | Exile | |
| May 4 | "Share the World/We Are!" | TVXQ | |
| May 11 | "Koi no ABO" (恋のABO, Love's ABO) | NEWS | |
| May 18 | "Sha La La/Mugen no Hane" (シャ・ラ・ラ/無限の羽, Sha La La/Infinite Feather) | Hideaki Takizawa | |
| May 25 | "Shōganai Yume Oibito" | Morning Musume | |
| June 1 | "Keshin" | Masaharu Fukuyama | |
| June 8 | "Ashita no Kioku/Crazy Moon (Kimi wa Muteki)" | Arashi | |
| June 15 | "Again" | Yui | |
| June 22 | "Infinity" | Girl Next Door | |
| June 29 | "Spirit" (スピリット, Supiritto) | V6 | |
| July 6 | "Tanpopo/Kaizokusen/Sono Kobushi" (たんぽぽ/海賊船/其の拳, Dandelion/Pirate Ship/The Fist) | Yusuke | |
| July 13 | "Everything" | Arashi | |
| July 20 | "Tanabata Matsuri" (七夕祭り, Tanabata Festival) | Tegomass | |
| July 27 | "Akuma na Koi/NYC" (悪魔な恋/NYC, Devilish Love/NYC) | Yuma Nakayama w/B.I.Shadow, NYC Boys | |
| August 3 | "The Hurricane (Fireworks)" | Exile | |
| August 10 | "Ayakashi" (妖～あやかし～, Marine Ghost) | Koichi Domoto | |
| August 17 | "Ichibu to Zenbu/Dive" | B'z | |
| August 24 | "Sunrise/Sunset (Love Is All)" | Ayumi Hamasaki | |
| August 31 | "Tokimeki no Rumba" (ときめきのルンバ, Tokimeki no Runba, Rumba of Palpitation) | Kiyoshi Hikawa | |
| September 7 | "Sotto Kyutto/Superstar" (そっと きゅっと/スーパースター★, Sotto Kyutto/Sūpāsutā★, Softly Hard/Superstar) | SMAP | |
| September 14 | "Guilty" | V6 | |
| September 21 | "Rain" | Tsuyoshi Domoto | |
| September 28 | "Alive/Physical Thing" | Kumi Koda | |
| October 5 | "Hikari Hitotsu" (ヒカリひとつ, One Light) | Hideaki Takizawa | |
| October 12 | "Colors (Melody and Harmony)/Shelter" | Jejung & Yuchun (from TVXQ) | |
| October 19 | "It's All Too Much/Never Say Die" | Yui | |
| October 26 | "My Lonely Town" | B'z | |
| November 2 | "River" | AKB48 | |
| November 9 | "Swan Song" (スワンソング, Suwan Songu) | KinKi Kids | |
| November 16 | "Kyū Jō Show!!" | Kanjani Eight | |
| November 23 | "My Girl" | Arashi | |
| November 30 | "Loveless" | Tomohisa Yamashita | |
| December 7 | "Bandage" | Lands | |
| December 14 | "Nōdōteki Sanpunkan" | Tokyo Incidents | |
| December 21 | "Kimi ni Sayonara o" (君にサヨナラを, Good Bye To You) | Keisuke Kuwata | |
| December 28 | "Hatsukoi" | Masaharu Fukuyama | |
