= Cartoon KAT-TUN II You =

Studio album by KAT-TUN
- Released: April 18, 2007 (Japan)
- Recorded: 2006–2007
- Genres: Pop, rock
- Length: 1:00:42 (First Press & Regular Edition); 01:22:11 (Limited Edition)
- Labels: J-One Records; JACA-5055~5056 (Limited Edition); JACA-5057 (First Press); JACA-5058 (Regular)
- Producers: Johnny H. Kitagawa (executive), Julie K.

KAT-TUN chronology
Best of KAT-TUN (2006)	Cartoon KAT-TUN II You (2007)	KAT-TUN III: Queen of Pirates (2008)

Singles from Cartoon KAT-TUN II You
- 1. "Signal" Released: July 19, 2006; 2. "Bokura no Machi de" Released: December 7, 2006

Cartoon KAT-TUN II You is the second studio album by Japanese boy band KAT-TUN, released in Japan on April 18, 2007 by J-One Records. It is the group's first album that does not feature all six members, as Jin Akanishi had taken a sabbatical to study overseas six months prior to recording the songs. The album was released in three editions; a regular version with all 14 tracks, a first press edition with the same track listing as its regular counterpart with a 40-page photo booklet, and a limited edition which came with extra extended play versions of seven bonus tracks. The limited edition did not feature the song "You".

With the release of this album, KAT-TUN became the first group in Japanese music history to have all of their collective releases (three singles, two albums, and five DVDs at the time) reach number 1 on the charts. KAT-TUN went on a seven-city nationwide tour from April 3, 2007 to June 17, 2007 in support of the album. The last performance at Tokyo Dome was filmed and released on DVD entitled "Tour 2007 Cartoon KAT-TUN II You" on November 21, 2007.

== Album information ==
The album's title is similarly named to the group's late-night talk show, Cartoon KAT-TUN, which began airing two weeks before the album's release on Nippon Television. The album was recorded in Tokyo and Bennett Studios in Englewood, New Jersey, in the United States. Songwriters who presided over the group's debut album also contributed several tracks to the record. Ma-saya, who worked with KAT-TUN before, penned their second single, "Signal", and the third track, "Splash...". Kazumasa Oda, folk singer-songwriter formerly of Off Course, wrote their third single, "Bokura no Machi de", a tender love ballad. Yoji Kubota, a prolific lyricist for many of Japan's contemporary pop artists, wrote "Movin on..." with arranger Nao Tanaka and also penned "Heartbreak Club". The group's senpai (peer mentor), Takizawa Hideaki of Tackey & Tsubasa, composed the music for "My Angel, You are Angel". All tracks from the bonus CD are songs KAT-TUN had been performing in concerts and Shōnen Club since their junior days. The second track, "Peak", was used in a commercial for NTT DoCoMo's 903iTV series of cellphones in which Kazuya Kamenashi starred.

KAT-TUN members also received a solo track each which they co-wrote themselves, with the exception of Kazuya Kamenashi and Junnosuke Taguchi. The fourteenth track, "You", was not officially released as a single but a music video was shot marking Jin Akanishi's return to the group. The song also served as a theme song to Kamenashi's drama, Suppli. All rap lyrics featured in the album were also written by Koki Tanaka himself; he also co-wrote his rap verses in "Fight All Night" with Tomohisa Yamashita of News and with bandmate Yuichi Nakamaru for "No Matter Matter".

== Chart performance and reception ==
In its first week of release, Cartoon KAT-TUN II You sold 270,976 copies in Japan, a sharp drop from the first-week sales of their debut album. Despite the stark difference in reported sales, the album's two singles which had been released months in advance had seen more than 1 million shipments altogether before the album's release in April 2007. The album's first week numbers were enough to grab the number 1 spot on the Oricon album charts, however, and it stayed on the charts for another 3 weeks before dropping off the top 30.

The album has sold more than 354,973 copies to date and was certified as the 30th best-selling album of 2007 by Oricon at the end of the year and was later certified double platinum by RIAJ denoting over 500,000 shipments. KAT-TUN also won six awards at the 21st Japan Gold Disc Awards with "Signal" and "Bokura no Machi de" placing on "The Best 10 Singles (Domestic)" list.

== Track listing ==
Regular and First Press edition

1. "Signal" (ma-saya, Joey Carbone, Lisa Huang, AKIRA, Joker) - 3:37
2. "Peak" (Buduo Koike, Ayumi Miyazaki) - 4:13
3. "Splash..." (ma-saya, DoiToki, Seikou Nagaoka) - 4:59
4. "Bokura no Machi de (僕らの街で)" (Kazumasa Oda) - 4:42
5. "Make U Wet"^{1} (Joker, silvertongue, Akira) - 3:06
6. "Key of Life"^{2} (Yuichi Nakamaru, Nao Tanaka) - 4:06
7. "Lost"^{3} (Tatsuya Ueda, Ayumi Miyazaki) - 4:13
8. "Jumpin' Up" (Ami, Shoichirou Hirata, Masayuki Iwata, Joker) - 4:17
9. "Samurai*Love*Attack (サムライ☆ラブ☆アタック)" ^{4} (Anchang, ha-j) - 3:58
10. "Freedom" (Gota Nishidera, Makihiko Araki) - 4:42
11. "Someday for Somebody"^{5} (H.U.B., Koutaro Egami, Seikou Nagaoka) - 4:21
12. "Movin' On" (Yoji Kubota, Nao Tanaka, Joker) - 4:09
13. "Utai Tsuzukeru Toki (うたいつづけるとき)" (Narumi Yamamoto, Satomi Narumoto, Seikou Nagaoka) - 5:28
14. "You"^{6} (kenko-p, Sakoshin, Chokkaku, Joker) - 4:26

^{1} ^{2} ^{3} ^{4} ^{5} Koki Tanaka, Yuichi Nakamaru, Tatsuya Ueda, Junnosuke Taguchi and Kazuya Kamenashi solo tracks, respectively.
^{6} Regular and First Press Edition only.

Limited edition bonus EP

1. "Freeze (フリーズ)" (kenshin, Kaori Niimi, Joey Carbone, Anthony Mazza, ha-j, Taku Yoshioka) -3:06
2. "Love or Like" (Jin Akanishi, Spin, Akira) - 4:06
3. "Fight All Night" (Atozi Makoto, LaVenDer, Masaya Suzuki, Joker, Tomohisa Yamashita) - 2:29
4. "Heartbreak Club" (Yoji Kubota, Arata Tanimoto, Chokkaku) - 4:18
5. "My Angel, You are Angel" (Takeshi, Hideaki Takizawa, Hiroshi Shinkawa) - 4:15
6. "No Matter Matter (ノーマター・マター)" (Ayumi Miyazaki, Hideyuki "Daichi" Suzuki, Joker, Yucci) - 3:51
7. "Peacefuldays" (Akio Shimizu) - 4:15

=== Sales and certifications ===
Country	Provider	Sales	Certification
Japan	RIAJ	500,000	Double Platinum

== Credits ==
- Producer – Julie K.
- Executive producer – Johnny H. Kitagawa
- Management – Toshiya Kamada, Kaio Tsuruta and Atsushi "Sushi" Kosugi
- A&R – Jun Inoue
- Recording engineer – Dave Darlington
- Mastering – Hiroshi Kawasaki
- Mixing – Hideyuki "AK" Akimoto, Shigeru Tanida, Mikirou Yamada, Hiroshi Yokote, Manabu Yokota, Maki Kosugi, Tetsuro Takeuchi and Noboyuki Aoyagi
- Assistant mixers – Masahiro Shinbo, Takeshi Inoue, Kei Iizuka, Shinya Matsuo and Tadashi Hashimoto
- Recording studios – Victor Studio, Warner Music Recording Studio, Folio Sound, On Air Azabu Studio, Little Bach studio and Johnny's Studio (Tokyo); Bennett Studios (New York City)
- Art director – Shirohide Azuma
- Designer – Kohsuke "Tommy" Tomizu
- Photographer – Takeshi Machara
- Stylist – Hiro
- Hair and make-up – Koichi Toyofuku and Yoshinori Takeuchi
- Promotion – Yuichiro Iida, Shogo Okusu and Daigo Imai
- Sales promotion – Chiho Kitabayashi
- Artist promotion – Suguru Shirahase and Masami Yazaki
- Artist management – Ritsuro Sekiguchi
