= Utawara Hot Hit 10 =

Japanese music television program

Utawara Hot Hit 10 (ウタワラ Hot Hit 10) was a weekly Japanese music television program broadcast on Sundays 7:58 pm – 8:54 pm on Nippon Television. The series ended its run on January 28, 2007.

== Content ==
Utawara was a direct successor to its previous incarnation titled Minna no Terebi that began on April 10, 2005. Hosted by comedian Akiko Wada, Arashi member and actor of Hana Yori Dango Jun Matsumoto, Hello! Project idol singer Aya Matsuura, and perpetual guest stars KAT-TUN from Johnny's Jimusho, the show generally follows a Top Ten countdown format, covering the scope of the week's top singles in Japanese music. A panel of celebrity guests often sat next to the stage to provide commentary.

Early in the show's run, features continued from Minna no Terebi included covers of the week's songs by the hosts and guests of the show. The covers have moved to side with the emergence of new corners and features. As the show has progressed, KAT-TUN has played a larger role, starting with a special performance early in the show and eventually earning their own corner with their debut CD.

Weekly segments include a corner by comedian Tomochika playing a veteran singer on the decline of her career visiting various locales in Japan, usually punctuated by her covering a song from the week's countdown.

== Cast ==
- Jun Matsumoto
- Akiko Wada
- Aya Matsuura
- KAT-TUN
- Tomochika
- Hinoi Team
