= Lips (song) =

Single by KAT-TUN

from the album KAT-TUN III: Queen of Pirates
- A-side: "LIPS"
- B-side: LOVE; MESSAGE FOR YOU; (First Press CD Only)
- Released: February 6, 2008 (Japan)
- Recorded: 2008
- Genre: Pop rock
- Length: 4:21
- Label: J-One Records; JACA-5082~5083 (CD & DVD Limited Edition); JACA-5084 (First Press Limited Edition); JACA-5085 (Regular Edition)
- Songwriters: Axel-G, Yukihide "YT" Takiyama

KAT-TUN singles chronology
"Keep the faith" (2007)	"Lips" (2008)	"DON'T U EVER STOP" (2008)

"Lips" is the sixth single by Japanese boy band, KAT-TUN, and the third and last song to be commercially released from their third studio album, KAT-TUN III: Queen of Pirates. The single was released in three editions and as such, there are three different covers; the regular edition contains the title track, the B-side and its instrumental tracks, the first press edition came with a bonus track entitled "Message for You" and its instrumental version and the second limited edition was packaged with a DVD with the music video and a short film about the making of the PV.

The single was released on February 26, 2008, and became KAT-TUN's sixth consecutive number 1 single on the Oricon weekly singles charts & LIPS is the 9th most sold single in 2008 according to Oricon.

== Song information ==
"Lips" was written by Axel-G, who penned "She Said..." for the group's debut album. The music and arrangement was composed by Yukihide "YT" Takiyama whilst Koki Tanaka wrote his own rap verses under his pen name, JOKER. Described by co-lead vocalist Kazuya Kamenashi as the most intense hard rock song the group had ever done, the song speaks of an obsession with a girl's "dyed red lips" and the difficult relationship they share. The lyrics go on to urge the girl not to take on all the blame for the couple's troubles and to not "let go of [his] hand". Though not present in the studio version, Kamenashi usually screams after he sings the introductory verse during live performances. The song is also the theme song for Kamenashi's television drama, 1 Pound no Fukuin, which aired on NTV.

== Promotion ==
KAT-TUN performed the song on television for the first time on their own variety show Cartoon KAT-TUN on January 12, 2008. The group also sung on Music Station on February 1 and February 8, 2008, Fuji TV's Hey! Hey! Hey! Music Champ on February 4 and on NTV's Music Fighter on February 8.

== Chart performance ==
In its first week of release, "Lips" made its bow at number one on the Oricon singles chart knocking off Thelma Aoyama's "Soba ni Iru ne" from the top spot with 351,254 copies sold. It is the group's sixth consecutive chart-topper since their debut. The song spent 15 weeks on the chart and has reportedly sold over 421,902 copies to date and was certified platinum by the Recording Industry Association of Japan.

In February 2008, Lips was honored at the 23rd Japan Gold Disc Awards when it placed on the "Best 10 Music Singles (Domestic)" list alongside "Don't U Ever Stop".

== Track listings ==
- Normal Edition Track listing

No.	Title	Writer(s)	Length
1.	"LIPS"	Axel-G, Yukihide "YT" Takiyama	4:21
2.	"LOVE"	Axel-G, JOKER, Erik Lidbom, Yukihide "YT" Takiyama	3:15
3.	"LIPS (Instrumental)"		4:21
4.	"LOVE (Instrumental)"		3:15

- First Press edition track listing

No.	Title	Writer(s)	Length
1.	"LIPS"	Axel-G, JOKER, Yukihide "YT" Takiyama	4:21
2.	"LOVE"	Axel-G, JOKER, Erik Lidbom, Yukihide "YT" Takiyama	3:15
3.	"MESSAGE FOR YOU"	soba, Erik Lidbom	4:32
4.	"LIPS (Instrumental)"		4:21
5.	"LOVE (Instrumental)"		3:15
6.	"MESSAGE FOR YOU (Instrumental)"		4:32

- DVD track list

No.	Title	Length
1.	"LIPS (music video)"	4:30
2.	"LIPS (making of PV)"

=== Sales and certifications ===
Country	Provider	Sales	Certification
Japan	RIAJ	421,902	Platinum
