= Signal (KAT-TUN song) =

Single by KAT-TUN

from the album Cartoon KAT-TUN II You
- A-side: "Signal"
- B-side: "I'll be with you"
- Released: July 19, 2006 (Japan)
- Recorded: 2006
- Genre: Pop
- Length: 3:39
- Label: J-One Records; JACA-5043 (Limited); JACA-5044 (Normal Edition)
- Songwriters: Ma-saya, Joker, Joey Carbone, Lisa Huang and Akira

KAT-TUN singles chronology
"Real Face" (2006)	"Signal" (2006)	"Bokura no Machi de" (2006)

"Signal" is a song written by Ma-saya, Joker, Joey Carbone, Lisa Huang and Akira for the second single and second studio album of the Japanese boy band, KAT-TUN. It was released on July 19, 2006 in Japan, and became the group's second consecutive number one single on the Oricon daily and weekly singles charts.

== Release and promotion ==
The single was released in two pressings - a regular version with instrumental versions of all the songs and a limited edition containing the songs, the music video of the title track and a short film of the making of the music video. The single was used in a commercial for NTT DoCoMo's FOMA "9 Series" cell phone which all KAT-TUN members starred in.

KAT-TUN performed the song on television for the first time on Utawara, a variety talk show where they were already regulars alongside senpai Jun Matsumoto of Arashi, on July 16, 2006. They sang on Fuji TV's Hey! Hey! Hey! Music Champ the day after and made their second appearance on Masahiro Nakai's Utaban on July 20. KAT-TUN performed on Music Station on July 21 and two days later, returned to Utawara where they performed two weeks in a row - the latter performance being a medley of "Six Senses", "Real Face" and the single itself.

Other subsequent performances were on Utawara on October 1 and November 26 - the latter being a medley performance of "SIGNAL", "Shorty" and "Understandable" and Shounen Club on November 5, which Yuichi Nakamaru performed alone.

== Chart performance and reception ==
Following the immensely successful chart performance of their debut single "Real Face", "SIGNAL" was released on July 19, 2006 and continued the band's chart-topping run on the Oricon singles chart when it debuted at number 1 knocking off Koichi Domoto's double a-side single "Deep in Your Heart/+Million But -Love" by selling 450,752 copies in its first week. The song was certified as the fifth best-selling song of 2006 by Oricon with reportedly 569,527 copies sold at the end of its chart run and was later certified Double Platinum by RIAJ denoting over 500,000 shipments.

The single was honored at the 21st Japan Gold Disc Awards when it placed on the "Best 10 Singles (Domestic)" list along with "Real Face" and "Bokura no Machi de".

== Track listings ==
- Regular Edition

No.	Title	Writer(s)	Length
1.	"Signal"	Ma-saya (lyrics), Joker (rap), Joey Carbone & Lisa Huang (music), Akira (arrangement)	3:39
2.	"I'll be with You"	Yuuki Shirai (lyrics), Shusui, Carl Sahlin, Peter Ledin and Peter Moden (music), Seikou Nagaoka (arrangement)	3:30
3.	"Signal (Instrumental)"
4.	"I'll be with You (Instrumental)"

- Limited Edition

No.	Title	Length
1.	"Signal"
2.	"I'll be with You"
3.	"Signal (music video"
4.	"I'll be with You (making of music video)"

=== Sales and certifications ===
Country	Provider	Sales	Certification
Japan	RIAJ	569,527	Double Platinum
