= Don't U Ever Stop =

Single by KAT-TUN

from the album Break the Records: By You & For You
- A-side: "Don't U Ever Stop"
- B-side: w/out notice??; Natsu no Basho; Lovejuice; Parasite; Ai no Hana; Smack; (all available on limited editions only)
- Released: May 14, 2008 (Japan)
- Recorded: 2008
- Genre: Pop, rock
- Length: 4:14
- Label: J-One Records; JACA-5092 (Limited Edition 1); JACA-5093 (Limited Edition 2); JACA-5094 (Limited Edition 3); JACA-5095 (Regular Edition)
- Songwriters: SPIN, JOKER, Shusui, Fredrik Hult,

KAT-TUN singles chronology
"LIPS" (2008)	"Don't U Ever Stop" (2008)	"White X'mas" (2008)

"Don't U Ever Stop" is the seventh single by Japanese boy band, KAT-TUN, and the first single from their fourth studio album, Break the Records: By You & For You. The single was released in four editions and as such features four different covers; the three limited editions featured two solo songs (and its instrumental tracks) from two members each.

The first single with no tie-ins to commercials or television dramas since "Real Face", "Don't U Ever Stop" was released on May 14, 2008 and became KAT-TUN's seventh consecutive single to debut at number 1. The single was the eight bestselling single in Japan according to Oricon for 2008.

== Song information ==
The single is co-written by SPIN, a frequent songwriter for KAT-TUN who is also known for writing hit singles for Arashi ("Kitto Daijōbu", "Love so sweet", "Pikanchi Double" and "Hero" all reached number 1). The track's music was composed by Shusui, Fredrik Hult, Carl Utbult and additional arrangement was done by Yukihide "YT" Takiyama. The solo tracks featured on the three limited editions are "w/o notice??" (sung by Kazuya Kamenashi), "Natsu no Basho (夏の場所)" (Junnosuke Taguchi), "LOVEJUICE" (Jin Akanishi), "PARASITE" (Koki Tanaka), "Ai no Hana (愛の華)" (Tatsuya Ueda) and "SMACK" (Yuichi Nakamaru).

== Release and promotion ==
KAT-TUN performed the song on television for the first time on Music Station on April 25, 2008 and again on May 2, 2008. The group returned to the show on May 16 to sing it for the third time as part of a medley which included each of their respective solo songs. On May 11, Taguchi and Ueda appeared and performed the song on their kōhai Hey! Say! JUMP's variety show, Hi! Hey! Say, while Tanaka was a guest performer on HSJ's other show, Show wa Hey! Say!, the day after. All three rejoined the rest of the group on May 12 to perform on Fuji TV's Hey! Hey! Hey! Music Champ. Two days later, the band debuted the song on their own show, Cartoon KAT-TUN—the same day the single was released in Japan. On May 15, KAT-TUN made their fourth appearance on SMAP member Masahiro Nakai's Utaban and a day later, sang on Shounen Club Premium.

== Chart performance ==
In its first week of release, the single reportedly sold over 381,672 copies and knocked off NEWS' "Summer Time" from the top spot on Oricon's singles chart. It also debuted at number 1 on Billboard's Japan Hot 100. The song's total reported sales currently stand at 447,971 copies. The song was the second best-selling single for the first half of 2008 behind Thelma Aoyama's "Soba ni Iru ne" and later ranked as the eighth bestselling single of the year by Oricon and was later certified Platinum by RIAJ denoting over 250,000 shipments.

The song was honored at the 23rd Japan Gold Disc Awards when it placed on the "Best 10 Music Singles (Domestic)" list alongside "Lips".

== Track listings ==
- Regular edition track listing

No.	Title	Writer(s)	Length
1.	"Don't U Ever Stop"	SPIN, JOKER, Shusui, Fredrik Hult, Carl Utbult, Yukihide "YT" Takiyama	4:14
2.	"Don't U Ever Stop (Instrumental)"		4:14

- Limited edition 1 track listing

No.	Title	Writer(s)	Length
1.	"Don't U Ever Stop"
2.	"w/out notice?? (Kamenashi)"	n (lyrics) and AKIRA (music & arrangement)	3:38
3.	"Natsu no Basho (夏の場所) (Taguchi)"	NAO & Micro (lyrics); Micro, Nagacho & RYLL (music & arrangement)	4:46
4.	"w/out notice?? (Instrumental)"		3:38
5.	"Natsu no Basho (夏の場所) (Instrumental)"		4:46

- Limited edition 2 track listing

No.	Title	Writer(s)	Length
1.	"Don't U Ever Stop"
2.	"Lovejuice (Akanishi)"	Jin Akanishi (lyrics), Adrian Newman, Jade MacRae & Yuya Saito (music & arrangement)	3:49
3.	"Parasite (Tanaka)"	JOKER (lyrics); Atushi & Axel-G (music); Atsushi (arrangement)	4:07
4.	"Lovejuice (Instrumental)"		3:49
5.	"Parasite (Instrumental)"		4:07

- Limited edition 3 track listing

No.	Title	Writer(s)	Length
1.	"Don't U Ever Stop"
2.	"Ai no Hana (愛の華) (Ueda)"	Tatsuya Ueda (music & lyrics), ha-j (arrangement)	6:02
3.	"Smack (Nakamaru)"	Yuichi Nakamaru (lyrics), Tadashi Tanaka (music & arrangement)	4:19
4.	"Ai no Hana (愛の華) (Instrumental)"		6:02
5.	"Smack (Instrumental)"		4:19

=== Sales and certifications ===
Country	Provider	Sales	Certification
Japan	RIAJ	447,971	Platinum
