= Rescue (KAT-TUN song) =

Single by KAT-TUN

from the album Break the Records: By You & For You
- A-side: "RESCUE"
- B-side: "7 DAYS BATTLE, On Your Mind - Please Come Back to Me - (First Press CD Only)"
- Released: March 11, 2009 (Japan)
- Recorded: 2009
- Genre: Pop, rock
- Label: J-One Records; JACA-5138~5139 (CD+DVD - First Press Limited Edition); JACA-5140 (First Press Normal Edition); JACA-5141 (Normal Edition)

KAT-TUN singles chronology
"One Drop" (2009)	"Rescue" (2009)	"Love Yourself (Kimi ga Kirai na Kimi ga Suki)" (2010)

"Rescue" is the tenth single by Japanese boy band, KAT-TUN, and their fourth single from their fourth studio album, Break the Records: By You & For You. It was released on March 11, 2009 and became the group's tenth consecutive number one single on the Oricon daily and weekly charts tying them with NEWS for the second longest streak of number one singles since their debut in Japanese music history.

== Single information ==
The single was released in three pressings - a first press limited edition which included a DVD featuring the single's music video and a featurette of the making of the former, a first press normal edition which included a bonus track, and a regular edition with the instrumental versions of the single and its B-side track, "7 Days Battle".

== Chart performance ==
In its first week of its release, the single topped the Oricon singles chart, reportedly selling 322,597 copies. KAT-TUN gained their tenth consecutive number one single on the Oricon Weekly Singles Chart since their debut with all their singles sold more than 200,000 copies and continued to hold the second most consecutive number one singles since debut with fellow Johnny's group, NEWS. By the end of the year, "Rescue" was reported by Oricon to sell 377,097 copies and was later certified Platinum by RIAJ denoting over 250,000 shipments.

The song was honored at the 24th Japan Gold Disc Awards when it placed on the "Best 10 Music Singles (Domestic)".

== Track listings ==
- Normal Edition

No.	Title	Writer(s)	Length
1.	"RESCUE"	ECO (lyrics); JOKER (rap); Shusui, Tord Bäckström, Bengt Girell, Jan Nilsson (composers); Stefan Åberg, ha-j (arrangers)
2.	"7 DAYS BATTLE"	Sean-D (lyrics); JOKER (rap); Fredrik Hult, Sebastian Thott, Didrik Thott (composers, arrangers)
3.	"RESCUE (Instrumental)"
4.	"7 DAYS BATTLE (Instrumental)"

- First Press Limited Edition

No.	Title	Length
1.	"RESCUE"
2.	"7 DAYS BATTLE"
3.	"RESCUE (music video)"
4.	"RESCUE (making of music video)"

- First Press Normal Edition

No.	Title	Writer(s)	Length
1.	"RESCUE"
2.	"7 DAYS BATTLE"
3.	"On Your Mind - Please Come Back to Me -"	SPIN (lyrics); Sharon Vaughn, Harry Sommerdahl, Niklas Jarl (composer); Yoshinao Mikami (arranger)

=== Sales and certifications ===
Country	Provider	Sales	Certification
Japan	RIAJ	377,097	Platinum
