= Real Face =

Single by KAT-TUN

from the album Best of KAT-TUN
- A-side: "Real Face"
- B-side: GLORIA; Will Be All Right
- Released: March 22, 2006 (Japan)
- Recorded: 2006
- Genre: Pop; rock
- Length: 5:07
- Label: J-One Records; JACA-5030~5035 (Limited Edition); JACA-5036 (Normal Edition)
- Songwriters: Shikao Suga, Joker, Tak Matsumoto

KAT-TUN singles chronology
"Real Face" (2006)	"SIGNAL" (2006)

"Real Face" is a song written by Shikao Suga, Joker, Tak Matsumoto and Chokkaku for the debut single and debut album of the Japanese boy band, KAT-TUN. It was released on March 22, 2006, and debuted on the Oricon daily and weekly singles charts at number 1 where it stayed on the latter for 3 weeks. The song would eventually sell over a million copies by the end of 2006 and was named Japan's best-selling single of the year.

== Song information ==
There are three different versions of the song in KAT-TUN's discography:

- the single (debut, 2006) version, which was arranged by Chokkaku
- the version named "Real Face #1", included in Best of KAT-TUN, released simultaneously with the debut single, arranged by Matsumoto. It was used as the theme song for Taguchi's two-part drama movie, Happy!, aired by TBS on April 7, 2006, and December 26, 2006, respectively.
- Real Face #2", released in 2018, of which the lyrics were re-written by Suga, coinciding with the reduction of the group to 3 people. The song was included on the "Ask Yourself" single

=== Other versions ===
Suga recorded the song, including it on his albums "Sugarless II" and "Sugarless III".

Matsumoto used the music for his song "Guitar Hero", included in Tak Matsumoto Group's album TMG II

== Release and promotion ==
The single was released in two pressings - a normal edition containing the instrumental versions of all the songs released in this single and six limited editions containing the three songs with a music video of the single focusing on each respective member. As such, there are seven different covers. It was part of a tripartite release by the group and became available in stores on the same day as KAT-TUN's debut album, Best of KAT-TUN, and the tie-in DVD for the single, Real Face Film. All three releases were also available as a box set which has since gone out of print.

KAT-TUN performed the song on television for the first time on Music Station on March 10, 2006, and sang on variety show Utawara two days later where they were already regular guests with Jun Matsumoto of Arashi. They followed up with their first appearance on Hey! Hey! Hey! Music Champ on March 13 and performed live at the Tokyo Dome on March 17 which was simulcast on Music Station. The group were invited to Utaban for the first time on March 23 and performed on Music Fighter the day after. KAT-TUN rounded off the month by performing on Music Station for the third time in less than a month for the show's spring special episode on March 31.

Other subsequent promotional performances for the single were on CDTV (April 1), Hey! Hey! Hey! Music Champ (April 3), Shounen Club (April 9 and 16), Utawara (April 16, May 14, July 30, September 17 and November 5), Music Station (April 28 and December 22) and NTV's Minna Terebi 24 Hours TV charity fundraiser special (August 26). KAT-TUN also acted as hosts of the latter event. The group also collaborated with the song's lyricist, Shikao Suga, for a one-off live performance on Hey! Hey! Hey! Music Champ on May 12, 2008. On Shounen Club Premium in March 2011, KAT-TUN member Kamenashi performed a rock version of Real Face with Suga.

== Chart performance and reception ==
The single displaced NEWS' double A-side single "Sayaendou/Hadashi no Cinderella Boy" from the top spot and stayed at number 1 for 3 weeks on the Oricon weekly singles chart, a feat rarely achieved in the Japanese music industry, selling over 754,234 copies in its first week which broke fellow JE boy band, Arashi's record for their debut single, "Arashi." By the end of the year, the single had sold over a million copies and was certified as the best-selling single of 2006 by Oricon. Real Face was reported in 2010 by the Oricon's magazine, OriStar, for having sold over 1,046,125 copies and was later certified Million by RIAJ denoting over 1,000,000 shipments.

The single was honored at the 21st Japan Gold Disc Awards when it was named "Single of the Year (Domestic)" and placed on the "Best 10 Singles (Domestic)" list along with "SIGNAL" and "Bokura no Machi de". .

== Track listings ==
- Normal Edition

No.	Title	Writer(s)	Length
1.	"Real Face"	Shikao Suga (lyrics), Joker (rap), Tak Matsumoto (music), Chokkaku (arrangement)	5:07
2.	"Gloria"	Yoji Kubota (lyrics), Kouji Makaino (music), Seikou Nagaoka (arrangement)	4:30
3.	"Will Be All Right"	KAT-TUN (lyrics), Joker (rap), Kazuhiro Hara (music & arrangement)	4:40
4.	"Real Face (Instrumental)"
5.	"Gloria (Instrumental)"
6.	"Will Be All Right (Instrumental)"

- Limited Edition

No.	Title	Length
1.	"Real Face"
2.	"Gloria"
3.	"Will Be All Right"
4.	"Real Face (music video) (six different versions with each respective one focusing on one member)"

=== Sales and certifications ===
Country	Provider	Sales	Certification
Japan	RIAJ	1,046,125	Million
