= Break the Records: By You & for You =

Break the Records: By You & For You

Studio album by KAT-TUN
- Released: April 29, 2009
- Recorded: 2008–2009
- Genres: Pop, rock
- Label: J-One
- Producer: Johnny H. Kitagawa (executive)

KAT-TUN chronology
KAT-TUN III: Queen of Pirates (2007)	Break the Records: By You & For You (2009)	No More Pain (2010)

Singles from Break the Records: By You & For You
- 1. "Don't U Ever Stop" Released: May 14, 2008; 2. "White X'mas" Released: December 3, 2008; 3. "One Drop" Released: February 11, 2009; 4. "Rescue" Released: March 11, 2009

Break the Records: By You & For You (stylized as Break the Records -by you & for you-) is the fourth studio album by Japanese boy band KAT-TUN and was released in Japan on April 29, 2009 by J-One Records. The album was released in two editions: a limited-edition version with a 36-page photo booklet included and a regular edition which features the bonus track, "Moon".

It was the last album to feature Jin Akanishi.

== Content ==
Fourth album release from KAT-TUN including the songs "Don't U Ever Stop," "White X'mas (album version)," "One Drop," "Rescue," and more for 15 songs total. Regular edition includes one bonus track "Moon". Limited Edition includes special booklet. Features alternate jacket artwork. Adam Greenburg on Allmusic gave the album three out of five stars, stating that "this [album] probably isn't the best KAT-TUN album by any measure, but it shows a lot of incremental gains in ability and composition over previous efforts. The rawest energy and emotion captured by the band in some other releases may not always be present, but on Break the Records KAT-TUN nevertheless take a lot of steps in the right direction toward being a more mature band."

== Track listing ==
No.	Title	Writer(s)	Length
1.	"Don't U Ever Stop"	Spin, Joker, Shusui, Fredrik Hult, Carl Utbult, Yukihide YT Takiyama
2.	"Sadistic Love"	Masanco, Joker, Steven Lee, Eigo
3.	"Rescue"	Eco, Joker, Shusui, Tord Bäckström, Bengt Girell, Jan Nilsson, Stefan Åberg, Ha-j
4.	"Water Dance"	Masanco, Joker, M.Y., Yuichi Hamamatsu
5.	"One Drop"	Spin, Joker, T-oga, Mur, Ha-j
6.	"White World" (Yūichi Nakamaru solo)	Katsuhiko Sugiyama
7.	"Care" (Jin Akanishi solo)	Akanishi, Kazunari Ohno, Noriyoshi Matsushita
8.	"1582" (Kazuya Kamenashi solo)	N, M.Y., Yuichi Hamamatsu
9.	"Pierrot" (Koki Tanaka solo)	Joker, Atsushi
10.	"Hana no Mau Machi" (Tatsuya Ueda solo, 花の舞う街 "The Town Where Flowers Dance")	Ueda, Kao
11.	"Wind" (Junnosuke Taguchi solo)	Taguchi, Gin Kitagawa
12.	"Kimi Michi" (君道 "Your Road")	Mugen, Hidenori Tanaka, Kōsuke Noma
13.	"Shunkanshūtō" (春夏秋冬 "The Four Seasons")	Eco, Joker, Kōji Makino, Kaoru Okubo
14.	"White X'mas" (Album version)	Eco, Joker, Nao, Ha-j
15.	"Neiro"	Spin, Ryōsuke Shigenaga, Yoshinao Mikami
16.	"Moon" (Regular edition only)	Eco, Masanco, Jovette Rivera, Joey Carbone

== Chart positions ==
RIAJ certified Break the Records: By You & For You platinum denoting more than 250,000 shipments by September 2009.

Chart (2010)	Peak position
Japan Oricon Weekly Album Chart	1
Japan Oricon Yearly Album Chart	27

== Certifications ==
Country	Provider	Sales	Certification
Japan	RIAJ	243,305	Platinum
