= Lists of Hot 100 number-one singles of 2009 =

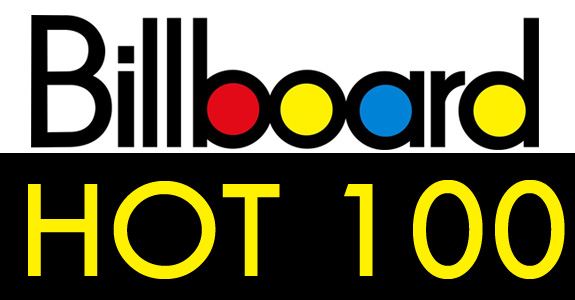

Lists of Hot 100 number-one singles of 2009 are lists of singles released in 2009 as ranked by Billboard magazine in the United States and associated magazines in other countries.

== Lists ==
- List of Billboard Hot 100 number-one singles of 2009
- List of Hot 100 number-one singles of 2009 (Japan)
- List of Canadian Hot 100 number-one singles of 2009
- List of Hot 100 number-one singles of 2009 (Brazil)

== See also ==
- Lists of number-one songs
