= Kanako Yanagihara =

Japanese actress, comedian, and tarento (born 1986)

- Born: February 3, 1986 (age 40); Nakano, Tokyo, Japan
- Occupations: Actress; comedian

Kanako Yanagihara (柳原 可奈子, Yanagihara Kanako) (born February 3, 1986, in Nakano, Tokyo, Japan) is a Japanese actress, comedian, and tarento, who has been featured in Cartoon KAT-TUN, the live-action drama Otomen, and collaborated on the music for Keroro Gunso the Super Movie 3: Keroro vs. Keroro Great Sky Duel. She is represented with Ohta Production.

== Film ==
- Maboroshi no Yamataikoku (2008) as Tamago
- Giovanni's Island (2014)

== Television ==
- Maru maru chibi maruko chan (Fuji TV/2007)
- Oniyome nikki: Ii yu da na (Fuji TV/2007)
- Nanase Once More (NHK/2008)
- Bakushō Reddo Kāpetto (2008)
- Otomen (Fuji TV/2009)
- Sora kara Nihon o Mite miyō, voice of Kumomi, (TV Tokyo/2009-2010)
