= Love of My Life (Japanese TV series) =

- Genre: Romance
- Starring: Kazuya Kamenashi; Haruka Ayase; Koki Tanaka; Yūta Hiraoka; Erika Toda
- Theme music composer: KAT-TUN
- Ending theme: Bokura no Machi de
- Country of origin: Japan
- Original language: Japanese
- No. of seasons: 1
- No. of episodes: 10 (list of episodes)

Production
- Producer: Norihiko Nishi
- Production location: Yokohama
- Running time: Saturday; 21:00-21:54

Original release
- Network: NTV
- Release: October 14 – December 16, 2006

Related
- My Boss My Hero; Enka no Joou

Love of My Life (たったひとつの恋, Tatta Hitotsu no Koi; also known as Just One Love) is a Japanese drama series, produced and aired in 2006 by NTV. It is a 10-episode drama series that was aired from October 14, 2006 through December 16, 2006.

== Synopsis ==
A story of love between the son of a man who runs a ship-repair factory beset with financial troubles and the well-bred daughter of a national jewelry chain store owner. The backdrop of the story is Yokohama, Japan.

A boy and a girl from highly different social backgrounds meet and fall in love, though not without obstacles. The setting is in Yokohama, a modern port city known for its romantic atmosphere. Hiroto Kanzaki (Kazuya Kamenashi) works hard every day and night for the survival of a small ship repair factory (inherited from his father) as well as the survival of his mother and younger brother, who are suffering from health problems. Living such an underprivileged life, Hiroto has forgotten how to smile. In contrast to him, Nao (Haruka Ayase) is the daughter of a popular jewelry shop owner in a fashionable street in Yokohama. She attends a prestigious exclusive women's college and grew up cheerful and blessed with affluent love. From the moment Hiroto meets her, his closed mind slowly opens up to Nao, who is so innocent that she utters whatever she thinks. Their three close friends, who are also 20-year-olds, play an important role in their developing relationship.

The scriptwriter is Eriko Kitagawa, who earned the nickname "The Goddess of Love Stories." This classic love story enables those who are in the same generation to feel empathy, or be envious of the characters' lives; and the rest, who were once 20-year-olds, to reminisce about their own "Love of My Life."

== Cast ==
- Kamenashi Kazuya as Hiroto Kanzaki (神崎弘人, Kanzaki Hiroto)
- Ayase Haruka as Nao Tsukioka (月丘菜緒, Tsukioka Nao)
- Tanaka Koki as Kou Kusano (草野甲, Kusano Kou)
- Yūta Hiraoka as Ayuta Ozawa (大沢亜裕太, Ozawa Ayuta)
- Toda Erika as Yuuko Motomiya (本宮裕子, Motomiya Yuuko)
- Kaname Jun as Tatsuya Tsukioka (月丘達也, Tsukioka Tatsuya)
- Tanaka Yoshiko as Mitsuko Tsukioka (月丘みつこ, Tsukioka Mitsuko)
- Zaitsu Kazuo as Yasuhiko Tsukioka (月丘雅彦, Tsukioka Yasuhiko)
- Yo Kimiko as Akiko Kanzaki (神崎亜紀子, Kanzaki Akiko)
- Saito Ryusei as Ren Kanzaki (神崎廉, Kanzaki Ren)

== Episode Titles ==
- Episode 01: Love across classes
- Episode 02: Holding hands
- Episode 03: We're through
- Episode 04: My rage, your tears
- Episode 05: You won't be around
- Episode 06: Our secret
- Episode 07: But, I...
- Episode 08: Goodbye
- Episode 09: We can definitely meet again
- Episode 10: Just one love
