= Rola Chen =

Chinese model in Japan (b. 1987)

Chinese name
- Simplified Chinese: 陈怡
- Traditional Chinese: 陳怡
Transcriptions
Standard Mandarin
- Hanyu Pinyin: Chén Yí

Japanese name
- Kana: ローラ・チャン
Transcriptions
- Romanization: Rōra Chan

Chen Yi (born May 13, 1987, in Hangzhou, Zhejiang), better known as Rola Chen, is a Chinese model and actress who works in Japan.

== Biography ==
=== Early life ===
While in middle school, she was nicknamed "Flower" (花). According to Chen, in China, the most beautiful girl in a school earns this title. She describes herself as a hardcore narcissist, as she photographs herself at least 100 times within a day by using her own digital camera, while she often [intentionally] mocks herself (especially on her blog) even using vulgar words.

=== Career ===
Rola participated in the Super Girl show and made it into the top 50, being discovered by a music producer from Japan. After a visit to Japan in October 2006, she made her debut in May 2007.

She has appeared in over 36 television programs, over 30 magazines, two radio programs, one television drama, one television commercial (for a canned coffee brand product of Asahi Soft Drinks) and released a photo book titled Rola♥Rola.

Her current noted works include her appearance in the 2008-launched NHK educational program "Chinese [language] on TV", where she has appeared as the host alongside Eiko Koike (as the student role) since March 31, 2008.
