= Ayumi Kataoka =

Japanese baseball player

Ibaraki Golden Golds – No. 1
- Second baseman
- Born: 14 November 1986 (age 38); Higashi-ku, Kumamoto, Kumamoto Prefecture
- Bats: Right bat

Career highlights and awards
- As a player: Kumamoto Prefectural Kumamoto Commercial High School; Ibaraki Golden Golds (2005–); Samurai (2012–); As a manager: Ibaraki Golden Golds (2011–)

Ayumi Kataoka (片岡 安祐美, Kataoka Ayumi, born 14 November 1986, in Higashi-ku, Kumamoto, Kumamoto Prefecture) is a Japanese female baseball player (infielder) and manager.

Kataoka graduated from Ryutsu Keizai University Faculty of Economics Faculty of Business.

Currently, she belongs to the community people baseball club team Ibaraki Golden Golds. As a tarento, Kataoka belongs to the entertainment office Sato-kikaku where the inquiries of the same team are established.

== Television ==
| Year | Title | Network | Notes |
|---|---|---|---|
| | Dora Go! | TV Tokyo | Appeared with Takahiro Azuma, who shared the same office |
| 2015 | Mecha-Mecha Iketeru! | Fuji TV | Kataoka won the test herself |
| 2016 | Joshi Athlete ga iku! Kagoshima meguri Tabi | BS NTV | Co-starred with Miho Koga, who was also born from Kumamoto |
| 2016 | Boat Race Live: Shōri e no Turn | BS Fuji | |

== Radio ==
| Year | Title | Network | Notes |
|---|---|---|---|
| 2016 | Fumio Takada no Radio Beverly Hiru zu | NCB | "Kore ga Ryūkō Saizensenda! Shōta no nan demo Banzuke" guest |

== Advertisements ==
| Year | Title | Notes |
|---|---|---|
| 2007 | Pola Keshōhin "Whitissimo" | First advert appearance |

== Posters ==
| Year | Title |
|---|---|
| 2006 | Hōjin-kai |
| 2007 | Shōbōdanin Boshū poster |

== Photo albums ==
| Year | Title | Notes |
|---|---|---|
| 2008 | Touch Up! | Produced by manga artist Mitsuru Adachi |
