= Chisako Takashima =

Japanese media tarento and violinist

Chisako Takashima(A-24)
- 高嶋 ちさ子
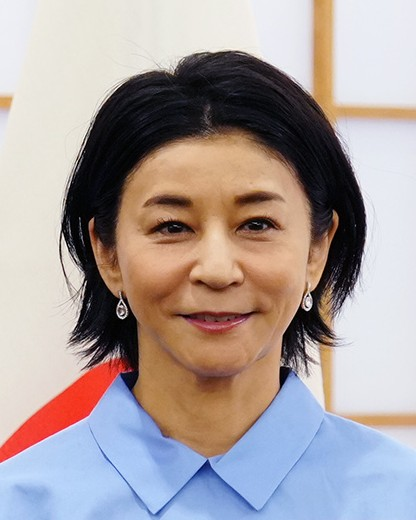
- Born: August 24, 1968 (age 57); Tokyo, Japan
- Education: Yale School of Music
- Occupations: Tarento, violinist, music producer
- Years active: 1994–
- Agent: J-two
- Relatives: Hiroyuki Takashima (father); Tadao Takashima (uncle); Masahiro Takashima (cousin); Masanobu Takashima (cousin)
- Website: Official website

Chisako Takashima (高嶋 ちさ子, Takashima Chisako; born August 24, 1968) is a Japanese tarento and violinist. She was born in Tokyo.

== Filmography ==
=== TV and radio series ===
Year	Title	Network	Notes	Ref.
2001	Geijutsu ni Koishite!	TV Tokyo	Moderator	
	NDS presents Chisako Takashima Gentle Wind	FM Aichi		
	Watashi wa Akiramenai	NHK		
2009	Umi o Watatta Samurai Kan'ichi Asakawa	BS Asahi		
2012	Ogiyahagi no Aisha Henreki No Car, No Life!	BS NTV		

=== Advertisements ===
Title	Notes
Honda Fit aria	
Nihon Denwa Shisetsu	
Lawson Premium Roll Cake	

=== Films ===
Year	Title	Notes
2003	Bayside Shakedown 2	

== Discography ==
=== Singles ===
Year	Title	Notes
1996	"The Charm Of English Muffin"	
1996	"Kuro Neko no Tango"	

=== Albums ===
Year	Title	Notes	Ref.
1995	Chocolate Fashion 1		
1995	Chocolate Mix		
1996	English Muffin		
1996	Akuma no Romance		
1997	Colorful	Violinist for "Orange"	
1998	Rare Chocolate		
1999	Chisa & Mino		
2000	Mezamashi Classics		
2000	Cinema Paradiso: Cinema on Violin		
2000	Kaze no Tōrimichi		
2001	Lovin' You		
2001	Mezamashi Classics 2		
2001	Chisa & Mino 2		
2001	Chisako! Early Best! 1995-1998		
2001	Angel's Dream: In Paradium		
2002	Simba		
2002	Meza Cla 2003: Chisako Takashima to Nakama-tachi		
2003	Around The World: Chisako Takashima & Prague Camerata		
2004	Mezamashi Classics Best		
2004	freedom: chisako style music		
2005	Crossover Selection		
2005	Classical Selection		

=== CD extras ===
Year	Title	Notes
1996	Carmen Fantasy	
1996	Aishū no Europe: Europe	

== Awards ==
Year	Title	Notes
1997	Concerto Competition Prize	
