= Cartoon KAT-TUN =

Television series

Cartoon KAT-TUN (カートゥンKAT-TUN, Kātun Katūn) was a Japanese variety show hosted by KAT-TUN, a Japanese boy band formed by Johnny & Associates. The show began airing on April 4, 2007, and ended on March 24, 2010. It aired every Wednesday from 11:55 pm to 12:26 am on NTV for 3 years. The theme song for the first season of the show was "Girlfriend" by Avril Lavigne, Shelter by Corrinne May for the second season and Come On Eileen by Dexy's Midnight Runners for the third season.

== Season 1 Segments ==
=== 100Q ===
This is the main segment of the show where the guest fills out a questionnaire with 100 questions before the show. The questions and answers are displayed on a rotating ring in front of KAT-TUN and the guest during the show. When any of the members have an interest in any of the questions, they simply "touch" the ring and it momentarily stops so the guest can elaborate on their answer. At the official website, under 100Q, all of the question and answers that the guest filled out are there.

=== Mini Stage ===
Mini Stage is where KAT-TUN performs their songs live. They usually do so when they recently released a single.

=== DAT-TUN5 ===
It's a game of bingo-darts where they use a five by five square dart board. The first team with five darts in a row (in any direction) wins. If the guest wins, they receive a golden dart, but if KAT-TUN loses five times consecutively they receive a punishment game.

=== Half and Half ===
Guests must ask KAT-TUN a Yes or No question that splits the group in half in order to receive a delicious food prize. The guests have 3 chances but usually KAT-TUN is lenient and splits in half so the guest can receive their present.

=== Smile Athlete No. 1 Decision Battle ===
This corner is the punishment game received when KAT-TUN loses five consecutive DAT-TUN5 games. They have to complete a series of athletic games while maintaining their smiles. Whoever stops smiling will be punished by the Tickling Guan Yin. When this happens, they are strapped to a board decorated to look like Guan Yin, and his multiple hands from behind the board mercilessly tickles them.

=== Dangerous Present Exchange ===
A corner where KAT-TUN and their guest pretend to be smuggling illegal goods, which are actually presents for each other. They come up with special code words, and the gifts are custom made (designed, produced) by KAT-TUN and their guest.

=== ♥disk ===
♥disk is a part of the show where they invite various artists to come and talk about their favorite songs. They ask question such as "Do you have any songs in which the lyrics touch you?" and "Which artist influences you the most?".

== Season 2 ==
=== What is Love? ===
The show's format was completely revamped in June 2008 in favour of a six-month-long special in which each KAT-TUN member is given the task to find out the true definition of love by their own means. KAT-TUN is seen seemingly living in an underground bunker where they host guests on the show in each respective member's room. Most conversations revolve around the topics of love and relationships in lieu with the theme though new episodes have not strictly followed the format. A good majority of the new format have also seen KAT-TUN venturing out of the studio to do various activities with guests.

== Season 3 ==
=== Lessons of Life ===
KAT-TUN members get sent to various locations to learn different lessons of life. For the first time the show had a live audience in the studio which allowed them to connect with their fans and made for a livelier atmosphere. For the majority of the show they were split into two filming teams of three KAT-TUN members; Kamenashi, Tanaka, Ueda on one team and Akanishi, Taguchi, Nakamaru on the other. When the teams arrived at their destined location they would be surprised by guests (usually comedians) to join them on their trip. Each team rotated creating film for the show and a lot of times each trip would span two episodes. Film is watched in the studio with all six members and at the very end of the show an "Omiyage" or souvenir is brought back to the studio for the rest of the members to enjoy.

== Episodes ==
=== Season 1 ===
Episode #	Air Date	Ratings	Guests & Content
1	April 4, 2007	2.9%	100Q: Ai (Singer); Note: Aired 30 minutes late due to baseball game
2	April 11, 2007	4.2%	100Q: Izumi Mori (Model/Host); DAT-TUN5: Musashi (Kickboxer)
3	April 18, 2007	5.9%	100Q: SEAMO (Singer/Rapper); DAT-TUN5: Atsushi Tsutsumishita (Comedian); Note: Aired 30 minutes late
4	April 25, 2007	4.8%	100Q: Hideo Tokoro (Martial artist); DAT-TUN5: Takeda Nobuhiro (Soccer player)
5	May 2, 2007	6.9%	100Q: Mari Sekine (Celebrity/Music Japan host); DAT-TUN5: Avril Lavigne (Singer)
6	May 9, 2007	5.1%	100Q: mihimaru GT (Singers); DAT-TUN5: George Tokoro (musician); Note: First episode with Jin Akanishi
7	May 16, 2007	4.0%	100Q: Homare Sawa, Eriko Arakawa & Azusa Iwashimizu (Japanese national female soccer players); DAT-TUN5: Tokoro George (Musician)
8	May 23, 2007	4.8%	100Q: Crystal Kay (Singer); DAT-TUN5: MEGUMI (Actress/Singer)
9	May 30, 2007	4.8%	100Q: Miki Maya (Actress); Note: Aired 30 minutes late
10	June 6, 2007	4.7%	Smily Athlete Part 1: Limbo; DAT-TUN5: Miki Maya (Actress); Mini Stage: Yorokobi no Uta by KAT-TUN
11	June 13, 2007	4.9%	100Q: Becky (Host); Mini Stage: Your Side by KAT-TUN
12	June 20, 2007	6.3%	Smily Athlete Part 2: Back muscle strength test; 100Q: Sadao Abe (Actor)
13	June 27, 2007	4.1%	100Q: Nobuhiko Takada (Pro-Wrestler); Dangerous Present Exchange: Ne-Yo (Singer); From KAT-TUN to Ne-Yo: Original Sneakers designed by Koki; From Ne-Yo to KAT-TUN: Ne-Yo T-Shirts & his new single; Note: Aired 15 minutes late
14	July 4, 2007	4.9%	100Q: Eiko Koike (Actress); DAT-TUN5: Sasaki Kazuhiro (Professional Baseball player)
15	July 11, 2007	4.0%	100Q: MCU (Rapper); DAT-TUN5: Ayumi Kataoka (Professional Baseball player); Note: Aired 10 minutes late
16	July 18, 2007	4.7%	100Q: Nao Matsushita (Singer/Actress/Pianist); Dangerous Present Exchange: Rihanna (Singer); From KAT-TUN to Rihanna: Original Hat designed and ordered by KAT-TUN; From Rihanna to KAT-TUN: Autographed umbrellas for each member
17	July 25, 2007	3.4%	Smily Athlete Part 3; 100Q: Chisako Takashima (Violinist)
18	August 1, 2007	5.3%	100Q: Gal Sone (Sonene from Gyaruru and a competitive eater)
19	August 8, 2007	4.6%	100Q: Chihara Kyoudai (Comedian Duo from Osaka)
20	August 15, 2007	5.0%	100Q: Show Aikawa (Actor/Composer); Mini Stage: GOLD by KAT-TUN
21	August 22, 2007	5.0%	100Q: Maki Nishiyama (CanCam model); ♥disk: Sowelu (Singer)
22	August 29, 2007	7.4%	George Tokoro; Okinawa Special (Part 1)
23	September 5, 2007	5.5%	George Tokoro; Okinawa Special (Part 2)
24	September 12, 2007	5.4%	George Tokoro; Okinawa Special (Part 3 END); 100Q: Leah Dizon (Model/Singer); Note: Aired 30 minutes late due to Prime Minister Abe's resignation
25	September 19, 2007	6.5%	100Q: Kanako Yanagihara (Comedian); Badminton: Leah Dizon (Model/Singer)
26	September 26, 2007	4.8%	Okinawa Special (Extra Unaired Scenes)
27	October 3, 2007	4.2%	100Q: Arata Furuta (Actor); ♥disk: Hideaki Tokunaga (Guitarist); Note: Aired 30 minutes late due to Gyoten News Special
28	October 10, 2007	2.9%	100Q: KREVA (Rapper); ♥disk: TRF (Band)
29	October 17, 2007	4.5%	100Q: Minami (actress; main guest) & Tsurutarō Kataoka (actor); ♥disk: Aya Kamiki (Singer)
30	October 24, 2007	4.9%	100Q: Norifumi Yamamoto (Mixed Martial Arts Fighter)
31	October 31, 2007	4.2%	100Q: Maki Horikita (Actress)
32	November 7, 2007	5.3%	Cooking Challenge: Maki Horikita (Actress); Tanaka Koki Birthday Celebration; Preview of [Keep The Faith] PV by KAT-TUN
33	November 14, 2007	3.4%	100Q: Chara (Singer); KAT-TUN Collection: ハルカナ約束 by KAT-TUN
34	November 21, 2007	4.9%	100Q: Jun Hasegawa, Elli-Rose, Saya (ViVi models); Mini Stage: KEEP THE FAITH by KAT-TUN
35	November 28, 2007	4.1%	100Q: Hyde, Ken (L'Arc-en-Ciel); SP Medley: Crystal Kay & KAT-TUN; Note: Aired 15 minutes late
36	December 5, 2007	4.5%	100Q: DJ Ozma (Singer)
37	December 12, 2007	2.6%	♥disk: Ataru Nakamura (Singer); 100Q: Mie Sadamoto (JJ model); Note: Aired 60 minutes late due to soccer game
38	December 19, 2007	2.7%	100Q: Jinnai Takanori (Actor); Dangerous Present Exchange: Aly&AJ (Singers); From KAT-TUN to Aly&AJ: Rodeo Ball; From Aly&AJ to KAT-TUN: Aly&AJ Hello Kitty T-Shirts; Note: Aired 30 minutes late
39	December 26, 2007	4.4%	Recap of memorable guest moments throughout 2007 & deleted scenes
-	January 2, 2008	-	No Episode Aired
40	January 9, 2008	4.8%	100Q: Toda Erika (Actress)
41	January 16, 2008	6.4%	KAT-TUN no Senpai Oshiete Kudasai! Unaired Footage SP
42	January 23, 2008	4.4%	100Q: F-BLOOD (Singers); Dangerous Present Exchange: Alicia Keys (Singer); From KAT-TUN to Alicia Keys: Beginner Magic Kits; From Alicia Keys to KAT-TUN: Hats
43	January 30, 2008	6.2%	100Q: Shoko Nakagawa "Shoko-tan" (Singer/Host)
44	February 6, 2008	5.6%	100Q: Reiko Tokita (JJ Model) & Ryota Yamasato (Comedian)
45	February 13, 2008	3.2%	100Q: M-Flo (Hip-Hop Group)
46	February 20, 2008	4.7%	100Q: Satomi Takasugi (Singer)
47	February 27, 2008	5.4%	100Q: Every Little Thing (Singer/Guitarist)
48	March 5, 2008	5.6%	100Q: Yoko Kumada, Misako Yasuda, Jun Natsukawa (gravure idols)
49	March 12, 2008	5.9%	Hokkaidō Special Part 1 (Jin Akanishi & Yuichi Nakamaru) - Guest: MEGUMI
50	March 19, 2008	5.8%	Hokkaidō Special Part 2 (Jin Akanishi & Yuichi Nakamaru) - Guest: MEGUMI
51	March 26, 2008	4.4%	100Q: Episode Recaps; Note: Aired 30 minutes late
52	April 2, 2008	4.8%	100Q: Hiroyuki Miyasako & Eriko Sato (Actor/Comedian & Actress)
53	April 9, 2008	4.7%	"Jitsu wa boku" Special; Note: Aired 30 minutes late
54	April 16, 2008	4.3%	KAT-TUN No-Plans Trip Special
55	April 23, 2008	4.5%	KAT-TUN No-Plans Trip Special Continued
56	April 30, 2008	3.8%	"Heroes" SP: Masi Oka (US-based Actor/Digital Effects Artist)
57	May 7, 2008	5.5%	100Q: Tomochika (Comedian)
58	May 14, 2008	5.6%	100Q: Haruka Ayase (Actress/Singer); Mini Stage: DON'T YOU EVER STOP by KAT-TUN
59	May 21, 2008	5.0%	Okonomiyaki Challenge: Haruka Ayase (Actress/Singer)
60	May 28, 2008	5.3%	100Q: Black Mayonnaise (Comedians)

=== Season 2 ===
In search of "What is Love?"

Episode #	Air Date	Ratings	Guests & Content
61	June 4, 2008	4.1%	Love Series 1
62	June 11, 2008	3.3%	Love Series 2; Note: Aired 30 minutes late
63	June 18, 2008	2.9%	Love Series 3
64	June 25, 2008	3.4%	Love Series 4
65	July 2, 2008	4.0%	Love Series 5
66	July 9, 2008	3.7%	Love Series 6; Guest: Usher
67	July 16, 2008	3.3%	KAT-TUN Sendai SP Part 1
68	July 23, 2008	5.3%	KAT-TUN Sendai SP Part 2
69	July 30, 2008	6.3%	Shopping at Nakano Broadway—Guest: Shoko Nakagawa "Shoko-tan": Note: This is Shoko-tan's 2nd appearance on the show and only Jin Akanishi and Koki Tanaka were present.
70	August 6, 2008	4.4%	Guest: Puffy (musicians)
71	August 13, 2008	3.3%	KAT-TUN Sendai SP unaired scenes Part 3
72	August 20, 2008	2.3%	Guests: Dewi Sukarno (socialite) & Leona Lewis (singer)
73	August 27, 2008	4.4%	Guest: Shingo Yanagisawa (actor/comedian)
74	September 3, 2008	4.3%	Hollywood SP — Guests: Will Smith & Jodie Foster
75	September 10, 2008	4.7%	Sex and the City SP—Shopping at Shibuya 109 (Kazuya Kamenashi): Guests: Patricia Field (stylist/fashion designer), Akane Osawa (model) and Rola Chen (model)
76	September 17, 2008	5.1%	Guest: Tomochika (comedian); Note: This is Tomochika's 2nd appearance on the show.
77	September 24, 2008	3.8%	KAT-TUN six-month love series unreleased scenes SP
78	October 1, 2008	4.4%	Guest: Kaori Manabe (model/TV host)
79	October 8, 2008	3.5%	Guest: Misako Yasuda (gravure idol)
80	October 15, 2008	5.4%	Guest: Rikimaru, Itou & Usagi
81	October 22, 2008	6.0%	Guest: Shimizu Michiko
82	October 29, 2008	4.6%	Guest: Ogura Yuko
83	November 5, 2008	3.8%	Guest: Harisenbon
84	November 12, 2008	6.6%	Guest: Kanako Yanagihara
85	November 19, 2008	4.4%	Guest: Kendo Kobayashi
86	November 26, 2008	5.4%	Guest: Haruna Ai
87	December 3, 2008	3.8%	Guest: Maki Sakai, Ryota Yamasato; Mini Stage: White X' mas by KAT-TUN
88	December 10, 2008	4.4%	Guest: Nadagi Takeshi
89	December 17, 2008	2.0%	Guest: Kurita Kanichi
90	December 24, 2008	5.5%	Guest: X-Mas Special
91	January 7, 2009	4.7%	Guest: Outdoor shooting (Fuyuno Nagano Honkitsu Tour)
92	January 14, 2009	3.5%	Guest: Outdoor shooting (Fuyuno Nagano Honkitsu Tour)
93	January 21, 2009	5.5%	Guest: Nukumizu Youichi
94	January 28, 2009	4.6%	Guest: Ayako Nishikawa
95	February 4, 2009	5.6%	Guest: Akina, Audrey (owarai) (オードリー) - Toshiaki Kasuga and Masayasu Wakabayashi
96	February 11, 2009	3.8%	Guest: Yoshizumi Ishihara; Mini Stage: One Drop by KAT-TUN
97	February 18, 2009	5.3%	Guest: Hayashi Yoshiharu
98	February 25, 2009	3.9%	Guest: Robert (ロバート) Baba Hiroyuki, Hiroshi Yamamoto and Ryuji Akiyama.
99	March 4, 2009	3.4%	Guest: Furuta Arata; Mini Stage: Rescue by KAT-TUN
100	March 11, 2009	5.0%	Guest: Hanya
101	March 18, 2009	3.9%	Guest: Becky
102	March 25, 2009	3.9%	Guest: Becky
103	April 1, 2009	4.7%	Guest: Harumi Edo, COWCOW
---	April 5, 2009	11.4%	KAT-TUN 先辈 100件事 II SP
104	April 8, 2009	6.1%	Parts of 先辈 100件事 II SP
105	April 15, 2009	4.3%	Guest: Tsutomu Sekine, parts of 先辈 100件事 II SP
106	April 22, 2009	5.5%	Guest: Tomochika, Ikeda & Kuwabata Ohara
107	April 29, 2009	5.6%	Best of Season 2 episodes

=== Season 3 ===
mission... members of KAT-TUN learn various things.

Episode #	Air Date	Ratings	Guests & Mission
108	May 6, 2009	5.9%	KAT-TUN @ Studio; AT-N - Circus; Guest: 柳原可奈子 (Kanako Yanagihara)
109	May 13, 2009	6.7%	KAT-TUN @ Studio; K-TU - Hiking (高尾山 Takao-san); Guest: ロバート (Robert) - Comedy Trio; 秋山竜次 (Akiyama Ryuuji),山本博 (Yamamoto Hiroshi),馬場裕之 (Baba Hiroyuki)
110	May 20, 2009	5.1%	KAT-TUN @Studio; AT-N - Camping; Guest: 大沢あかね (Osawa Akane)
111	May 27, 2009	5.6%	KAT-TUN @Studio; K-U @ Animal Plaza - Dog Lovers; Guest: インパルス-Duo (Impulse); 堤下敦 (Atsushi Tsutsumishita), 板倉俊之 (Itakura Toshiyuki)
112	June 3, 2009	4.8%	KAT-TUN @Studio, AT-N - Maru pool dive
113	June 10, 2009	5.2%	Break the Records Con'09 MC parts, Maru bungee jump
114	June 17, 2009	5.5%	KAT-TUN @Studio; K-TU - Big Family Visit - Part 1; Guest: ロバート (Robert) - Comedy Trio; 秋山竜次 (Akiyama Ryuuji),山本博 (Yamamoto Hiroshi),馬場裕之 (Baba Hiroyuki)
115	June 24, 2009	5.8%	KAT-TUN @Studio; K-TU - Big Family Visit - Part 2; Guest: ロバート (Robert) - Comedy Trio, 秋山竜次 (Akiyama Ryuuji),山本博 (Yamamoto Hiroshi),馬場裕之 (Baba Hiroyuki)
116	July 1, 2009	5.7%	Studio; AT-N - Eating Big Food; Guest: 品川庄司 (Shinagawa Shoji) - Comedy duo, 品川祐 (Shinagawa Hiroshi),庄司智春 (Shoji Tomoharu)
117	July 8, 2009	4.4.%	KAT-TUN @Studio; Guest: 久本雅美 (Masami Hisamoto)
118	July 15, 2009	4.9%	KAT-TUN @Studio; AT-N - SR (Super Ranger) Rescue; Guest: 近藤春菜 (Kondo Haruna)
119	July 22, 2009	5.7%	KAT-TUN @Studio; K-TU - Hiking @ Mt. Mitake (御岳山); Guests: 板倉俊之 (Itakura Toshiyuki), 庄司智春 (Shouji Tomoharu)
120	July 29, 2009	5.9%	KAT-TUN @Studio; AT-N - Kindergarten class; Guest: 柳原可奈子 (Yanagihara Kanako)
121	August 5, 2009	4.6%	KAT-TUN @Studio; K-TU - Tennis with 松岡修造 (Matsuoka Shuzo) - Part 1; Guest:虻川美穂子 (Abukawa Mihoko), 伊藤さおり (Ito Saori)
122	August 12, 2009	4.8%	KAT-TUN @Studio; K-TU - Tennis with 松岡修造 (Matsuoka Shuzo) - Part 2; Guest:虻川美穂子 (Abukawa Mihoko), 伊藤さおり (Ito Saori)
123	August 19, 2009	4.1%	KAT-TUN @Studio; AT-N - Villain acting; Guest: くわばたりえ (Kuwabata Rie), 柴崎蛾王 (Shibazaki Gao)
124	August 26, 2009	5.7%	KAT-TUN @Studio; K-TU - Hiking @Mt. Fuji (富士山) - Part 1; Guest: ロバート (Robert) - Comedy Trio, 秋山竜次 (Akiyama Ryuuji), 山本博 (Yamamoto Hiroshi), 馬場裕之 (Baba Hiroyuki)
125	September 2, 2009	5.5%	KAT-TUN @Studio; K-TU - Hiking @Mt. Fuji (富士山) - Part 2; Guest: ロバート (Robert) - Comedy Trio, 秋山竜次 (Akiyama Ryuuji), 山本博 (Yamamoto Hiroshi), 馬場裕之 (Baba Hiroyuki)
126	September 9, 2009	3.3%	KAT-TUN @Studio; AT-N - Nagasaki - Part 1; Guest: 大沢あかね (Osawa Akane), 武田修宏 (Nobuhiro Takeda)
127	September 16, 2009	5.2%	KAT-TUN @Studio; AT-N - Nagasaki - Part 2; Guest: 大沢あかね (Osawa Akane), 武田修宏 (Takeda Nobuhiro)
128	September 23, 2009	4.5%	KAT-TUN @Studio; 「カツカツ」秋のオキテ100連発スペシャル - Favorite clips of Season 3
129	September 30, 2009	3.3%	KAT-TUN @Studio; 「カツカツ」秋のオキテ100連発スペシャル - Favorite clips of Season 3 - Part 2
130	October 7, 2009	5.1%	KAT-TUN @Studio; K-TU - Super Cheap Bus Trip (激安バスツアーのオキテ); Guest: Black Mayonnaise (Comedians)
131	October 14, 2009	4.9%	KAT-TUN @Studio; K-TU - Super Cheap Bus Trip - Part 2 (激安バスツアーのオキテ); Guest: Black Mayonnaise (Comedians)
132	October 21, 2009	5.5%	KAT-TUN @ Studio; AT-N - Morisanchu's Okite; Guests: 森三中 (Morisanchu) - Comedy Trio; 黒沢宗子 (Kurosawa Kazuko), 村上知子 (Murakami Tomoko), 大島美幸 (Oshima Miyuki)
133	October 28, 2009	4.0%	KAT-TUN @Studio; K-TU - rules of weekend celebrities; Guest: 藤あや子 (Fuji Ayako)
134	November 4, 2009	3.8%	KAT-TUN @ Studio; KAT-TUN - 絶対真似したくなるオキテSP
135	November 11, 2009	4.3%	KAT-TUN @Studio; KAT-TUN - 絶対真似したくなるオキテSP - Part 2
136	November 18, 2009	4.8%	KAT-TUN @Studio; AT-N - Outdoors (Autumn) Okite - Part 1; Guests: 森三中 (Morisanchu) - Comedy Trio
137	November 25, 2009	4.4%	KAT-TUN @Studio; AT-N - Outdoors (Autumn) Okite - Part 2; Guest: 森三中 (Morisanchu) - Comedy Trio
138	December 2, 2009	4.4%	KAT-TUN @Studio; K-TU - Women's Fishing Okite; Guest: 田村亮 (Ryo Tamura) (from ロンドンブーツ1号2号 (London Boots Ichi-go Ni-go) - Comedy Duo), 児島玲子 (Kojima Reiko)
139	December 9, 2009	4.5%	KAT-TUN @Studio; AT-N @ モテマナーのオキテ; Guest: はるな愛 (Haruna Ai)
140	December 23, 2009	3.8%	KAT-TUN - Christmas Bus Tour; Guest: ロバート (Robert) - Comedy Trio
---	January 6, 2010	9.2%	KAT-TUN @ Studio; KAT-TUN 先辈 100件事 III SP
141	January 6, 2010	4.4%	KAT-TUN @Studio; KAT-TUN 先辈 100件事 III SP Rules of Adulthood - unaired scenes part 1
142	January 13, 2010	5.0%	KAT-TUN @Studio; KAT-TUN 先辈 100件事 III SP Rules of Adulthood - unaired scenes part 2
143	January 20, 2010	5.6%	KAT-TUN @Studio; K-TU @ Shimokitazawa (下北沢); Guest: 有吉弘行 (Hiroiki Ariyoshi)
144	January 27, 2010	3.6%	KAT-TUN @Studio; Taguchi, Nakamaru - 五反田のオキテ; Guest: 品川区五反田, ケンドーコバヤシ
145	February 3, 2010	3.6%	KAT-TUN @Studio; K-TU @ ちょいモテ不動産のオキテ (real estate); Guest: 大久保佳代子 (Kayoko Okubo)
146	February 10, 2010	5.4%	KAT-TUN @Studio; T-TUN @ Winter Date - Part 1; Guests: スザンヌ (Suzanne), 神戸蘭子 (Kanbe Ranko), 柳原可奈子 (Yanagihara Kanako)
147	February 17, 2010	4.7%	KAT-TUN @Studio; T-TUN @ Winter Date - Part 2; Guests: スザンヌ (Suzanne), 神戸蘭子 (Kanbe Ranko), 柳原可奈子 (Yanagihara Kanako)
148	February 24, 2010	4.5%	KAT-TUN @Studio; K-TU @ 美人すぎるOOのオキテ (Too Beautiful Okite); Guest: Kirin 麒麟 (Comedian)
149	March 3, 2010	4.3%	Kamenashi, Tanaka - Winter Date Okite; Guest: Satoda Mai 里田まい (Idol), Barbie バービー (Comedian)
150	March 10, 2010	5.2%	Ueda, Nakamaru - エスコートのオキテ - Escort Okite; Guest: Kiritani Mirei (model) 桐谷美玲
151	March 17, 2010	5.3%	Akanishi, Taguchi - 下町ハイカラデートのオキテ (Haikara Date at Shitamachi); Guest: Reina Triendl トリンドル玲奈, Christina クリスティーナ (JJ Model)
152	March 24, 2010	4.9%	KAT-TUN @Studio; CTKT Episode FINALE - Memorable scenes, Top 3 viewer's choice clips from all 3 Seasons; Cartoon KAT-TUN's "Good-bye Message"
