= Tomochika =

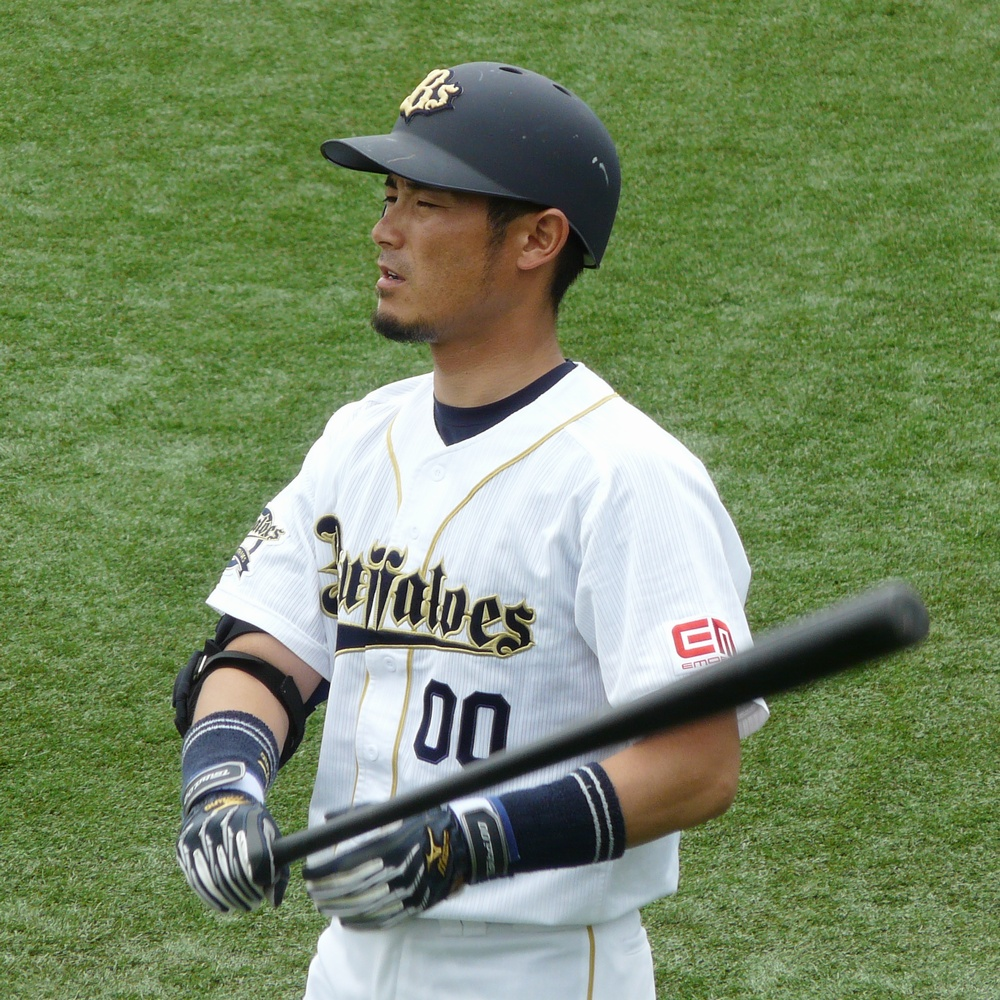
- Tomochika Tsuboi, Japanese baseball player
- Pronunciation: tomotɕika (IPA)
- Gender: Male

Origin
- Origin: Japanese
- Meaning: Different meanings depending on the kanji used

Other names
- Alternative spelling: Tomotika (Kunrei-shiki) Tomotika (Nihon-shiki) Tomochika (Hepburn)

Tomochika is both a masculine Japanese given name and a Japanese surname.

== Written forms ==
Tomochika can be written using different combinations of kanji characters. Here are some examples:

- 友親, "friend, parent"
- 友近, "friend, near"
- 友約, "friend, agreement"
- 友盟, "friend, alliance"
- 友誓, "friend, pledge"
- 知親, "know, parent"
- 知近, "know, near"
- 知約, "know, agreement"
- 知盟, "know, alliance"
- 知誓, "know, pledge"
- 智親, "intellect, parent"
- 智近, "intellect, near"
- 智約, "intellect, agreement"
- 智盟, "intellect, alliance"
- 共親, "together, parent"
- 共近, "together, near"
- 朋親, "companion, parent"
- 朋近, "companion, near"
- 朝親, "morning/dynasty, parent"
- 朝近, "morning/dynasty, near"
- 朝約, "morning/dynasty, agreement"
- 朝盟, "morning/dynasty, alliance"

The name can also be written in hiragana ともちか or katakana トモチカ.

== Notable people with the given name Tomochika ==
- Tomochika Miyano (宮野 ともちか), Japanese manga artist
- Tomochika Mizokami (溝上 知親; born 1977), Japanese Go player
- Tomochika Tsuboi (坪井 智哉; born 1974), Japanese baseball player
- Tomochika (友近), Japanese comedian, enka singer

== Notable people with the surname Tomochika ==
- Toshirō Tomochika (友近 聡朗) (born 1975), Japanese footballer and politician
