= One Drop (KAT-TUN song) =

Single by KAT-TUN

from the album Break the Records: By You & For You
- A-side: "ONE DROP"
- B-side: "D-T-S, On My Mind (First Press CD Only)"
- Released: February 11, 2009 (Japan)
- Recorded: 2008
- Genre: Pop; rock
- Length: 4:14
- Label: J-One Records; JACA-5128 (Limited Edition with DVD); JACA-5130 (Regular Edition: First Press); JACA-5131 (Regular Edition)
- Composers: t-oga, M.U.R. (music),
- Lyricists: Spin (lyrics), Joker (rap lyrics)

"One Drop" is a Japanese language song, and the ninth single, by Japanese boy band, KAT-TUN, and their third from their fourth studio album, Break the Records: By You & For You. It was released on February 11, 2009 and is the group's ninth consecutive number one single on the Oricon daily and weekly charts.

The song is sung in Japanese, but includes a few phrases sung in English, of which the title comes from the phrase "Only lonely your tear drop oh ...."

== Single information ==
The single was released in three editions and featured alternate jacket artwork. The limited edition came with a DVD featuring the music video and a featurette on the making of the video, the first press edition included a bonus track and the regular pressing came with the instrumental versions of the songs on the single."One Drop" is also the theme song for co-lead vocalist Kazuya Kamenashi's drama, Kami no Shizuku, in which he plays the lead character whilst "D-T-S" was used as the insert song for the Lotte "Plus X" television commercials.

== Chart performance ==
In its first week of its release, the single topped the Oricon singles chart, reportedly selling 281,359 copies. KAT-TUN gained their ninth consecutive number one single on the Oricon Weekly Singles Chart since their debut with all their singles sold more than 200,000 copies and continued to hold the second most consecutive number one singles since debut with fellow Johnny's group, NEWS.

By the end of the year, "One Drop" was reported by Oricon to sell 331,248 copies and was later certified Platinum by RIAJ denoting over 250,000 shipments.

== Track listings ==
- Limited edition track listing

No.	Title	Writer(s)	Length
1.	"ONE DROP"	Spin (lyrics), Joker (rap lyrics), t-oga, M.U.R. (music), ha-j (arrangement)
2.	"D-T-S"	Sean-D (lyrics), Joker (rap lyrics), Morino (music), ha-j (arrangement)

- First press edition track listing

No.	Title	Writer(s)	Length
1.	"ONE DROP"
2.	"D-T-S"
3.	"On My Mind"	madoca (lyrics); Ryuichiro Yamaki (music and arrangement)

- Regular edition track listing

No.	Title	Length
1.	"ONE DROP"
2.	"D-T-S"
3.	"ONE DROP (Instrumental Version)"
4.	"D-T-S (Instrumental Version)"

=== Sales and certifications ===
Country	Provider	Sales	Certification
Japan	RIAJ	331,248	Platinum
