= Koki Tanaka =

Japanese singer–songwriter and actor (born 1985)

Koki Tanaka 田中 聖
- Born: November 5, 1985 (age 40); Kashiwa, Chiba, Japan
- Genres: J-pop; Indie rock
- Occupations: Singer–songwriter; actor
- Instruments: Vocals; guitar
- Years active: 1998–present
- Labels: Project KOKI (current); Natural Ace Records (former); J Storm (former)
- Website: tanakakoki.official.ec

Koki Tanaka (田中 聖, Tanaka Kōki) is a Japanese singer–songwriter and actor. He was a member of Jpop idol boy band KAT-TUN from their debut until September 30, 2013, when his contract with Johnny & Associates (the company that manages KAT-TUN) was terminated. When he was a member of KAT-TUN, he was recognized as the rapper in the group and has a hip-hop-influenced style. Out of the other members, Tanaka was most often paired up with Yuichi Nakamaru and they even formed a comedy duo 'TaNaka'. After leaving Johnny & Associates, Tanaka formed his own indie rock band called INKT.

== Biography ==
=== Early life ===
Born in Chiba, Chiba prefecture; Japan on November 5, 1985, Tanaka is the second oldest of 5 siblings, all brothers and raised by their single mother. His younger brother Juri is also an actor and signed with Johnny & Associates. Juri along with Tanaka's youngest brother Subaru even appeared alongside Tanaka in the first episode of the TV series Tokkyu Tanaka 3 Go in which Tanaka played the lead role. His younger brother Hyouga is also an actor, and Tanaka's older brother is named Kazunaru.

Before Tanaka was born, his mother thought he would be a girl, so she thought of the name Maria (Saint). But he turned out to be a boy instead, so the Kanji letter of his name '聖' was kept, but its pronunciation was changed to “Kōki” (“Kōki” also means “Saint” in Japanese). Furthermore, when he was little his face was so cute and feminine that he was often mistaken for a girl.

Tanaka graduated from Horikoshi High School, and eventually went to study at Josai International University, but he quit halfway. He loves animals so much that he originally wanted to become a veterinarian.

=== Career ===
Tanaka joined Johnny & Associates in 1998 when he was only 13 years old, he once stated the reason why he applied was “My mother sent the application form behind my back. So I went to the audition without knowing anything at all. She told me it was because my cousin applied too. Therefore, we went to the audition together. But in the end, my cousin failed, while I passed.”

He became a member of Jpop idol boy band KAT-TUN from their debut in 2001 until September 30, 2013, when his contract with Johnny & Associates was terminated due to several contract violations and he left the company. In November the same year he formed his own Indie rock band called INKT and was the lead vocalist in the band, and they finally released their debut album on November 8, 2014. On September 1, 2017, it was announced on the band's website that INKT has now officially disbanded. After the band's disbandment, Tanaka still continues to release music and perform in live shows as a solo artist.

On January 23, 2019, Tanaka released his first solo album Easter under his own record label 'Project KOKI', followed by a solo national tour in Japan from February 2 to April 6, 2019. On July 31, 2019, Tanaka released his solo single Round and Round / end of begin and held a one-man solo live tour in August and a band tour in October. He then released a mini album LOUDER on October 2, 2019.

On January 5, 2020, Tanaka started his own official YouTube channel where he uploads original content often featuring him with his younger brother Hyouga.

In 2020 Tanaka announced that he would write, direct and star in his own stage show called OLD Maid-JOKER, the shows were originally scheduled to begin in June 2020 but had to be postponed due to the COVID-19 pandemic, the shows have since been rescheduled to play from April 21–25, 2021.

Since February 22, 2021 Tanaka has started a radio podcast show with his brother Hyouga called Tanaka Family Raaaaadio which broadcasts shows weekly every Sundays in Japan.

As an actor, Tanaka has appeared in a string of Japanese TV series and movies and has won 2 awards for his acting work in My Boss My Hero.

== Personal life ==
Tanaka can play several instruments. His main instrument is the guitar; he can also play the piano and the shamisen. He wrote most of the rap lyrics for KAT-TUN's songs and his solos, going by the pen-name of "JOKER". While in INKT, he wrote all the band's songs under his name 'KOKI'.

=== Legal troubles ===
On May 24, 2017, Tanaka was arrested for marijuana possession during a traffic stop, despite claiming the cannabis in his car were not his he was tested positive to the drug and was detained for 2 weeks while investigations were ongoing. He was eventually released from jail on June 7, on June 30 it was reported that Tanaka will not be prosecuted for marijuana possession charges as the police were not able to obtain enough evidence to prosecute him.

On February 24, 2022, Tanaka was arrested by police in Nagoya for alleged possession of methamphetamine. Tanaka has denied the allegations, and was quoted as saying that he did not know anything about the drugs.

On September 12, 2023, Tanaka was sentenced to 12 months in prison for possession and use of methamphetamines by a Chiba court. The prosecution alleged that Tanaka ingested illicit drugs at home on June 28, 2022. The following day he was arrested near Kashiwa station with 0.062 grams of methamphetamines found on his person. It occurred just nine days after his 20-month sentence by a Nagoya court on separate drug charges.

== Discography ==
=== INKT ===
Studio albums

Year	Album information	Chart position (debut week)	Sales
Year	Album information	JPN	Sales
2014	INKT: Format: CD, DVD; Release date: November 8, 2014; Record label: Natural Ace Records; Language: Japanese	17	JPN:
2015	サイサリス (Saisarisu): Format: CD, DVD; Release date: April 25, 2015; Record label: Natural Ace Records; Language: Japanese		JPN:
2016	Life's Color: Format: CD, DVD; Release date: September 21, 2016; Record label: Natural Ace Records; Language: Japanese		JPN:
2017	Square: Format: CD, DVD; Release date: May 3, 2017; Record label: Natural Ace Records; Language: Japanese		JPN:

=== Solo ===
Singles

Year	Single information	Chart position (debut week)	Sales
Year	Single information	JPN	Sales
2019	Round and Round / end of begin: Format: CD, DVD; Release date: July 31, 2019; Record label: Project KOKI; Language: Japanese		JPN:

Studio albums

Year	Album information	Chart position (debut week)	Sales
Year	Album information	JPN	Sales
2019	Easter: Format: CD, DVD; Release date: January 23, 2019; Record label: Project KOKI; Language: Japanese		JPN:
2019	LOUDER: Format: CD, DVD; Release date: October 2, 2019; Record label: Project KOKI; Language: Japanese		JPN:

== Live performances ==
=== Concerts ===
This is a list of all the live concerts that Tanaka has performed at and will perform in either solo or with his rock band INKT.

Year	Concert title	Role	Venues and dates
2014	INKT Fan Meeting Vol.1	Lead performer	Shinagawa Prince Hotel Stellar Ball; Tokyo (November 6)
2015	INKT 1st Live ~ The Birth of INKT	Lead performer	TSUTAYA O-WEST; Tokyo (January 18) & BIGCAT live house; Osaka (February 21)
2015	INKT one-man Live ~ Painting with INKT	Lead performer	EX Theater Roppongi; Tokyo (May 5)
2015	サイサリス (Saisarisu) Tour 2015	Lead performer	touring 7 different cities in Japan at various venues (1 concert in each city with a total of 7 shows), from July 19 to August 7
2015	Muscle King Party	Guest performer	TSUTAYA O-WEST (August 21)
2015	AOMORI ROCK FESTIVAL'15 ~ summer of demon	Guest performer	Night Koshiyama; Aomori (September 12)
2015	Saitama Super Arena 15th Anniversary presents "Meat Rock Festival 2015"	Guest performer	Saitama Super Arena; Saitama (September 13)
2015	GoneR Presents "Day of the Dead Vol.6"	Guest performer	Fushimi JAMMIN; Aichi (September 23)
2015	Gacharic Spin 6th Anniversary 2-Man Tour"	Guest performer	Nishikawaguchi LIVE HOUSE Hearts; Saitama (October 3), LIVE HOUSE J; Nagano (October 4)
2015	Piano Zombie vs INKT 2-Man Live	Lead performer	Kashiwa PALOOZA; Kashiwa, Chiba (October 25)
2015 - 2016	Re:birth of INKT Tour 2015-2016	Lead performer	8 different venues in various cities in Japan, from December 5, 2015, to January 4, 2016
2016	INKT / Gacharic Spin / Kamen Joshi 3-Man Live	Lead performer	Electric Lady Land; Nagoya (February 6)
2016	PALOOZA presents CIRCUIT SEX MACHINEGUNS VS INKT	Lead performer	Kashiwa PALOOZA (February 11)
2016	Summer Demon Phenomenon 2016 "ROAD TO 10th ANNIVERSARY series" INKT VS Summer Demon	Lead performer	Shinjuku ACB Hall; Tokyo (February 19)
2016	INKT 2-Man Live Tour	Lead performer	7 different venues in various cities in Japan, from April 2 - May 1, 2016
2016	LOKA ~ THE ORIGINS TOUR 2016	Lead performer	Yokohama Club Lizard; Yokohama (May 4), Shinsaibashi Club DROP (May 21) & Nagoya HOLIDAY NEXT (May 29)
2016	INKT FC Members-only Live 2016	Lead performer	Gakugeidaigaku Maple House; Tokyo (May 8)
2016	Louder!!!!!	Lead performer	Shibuya THE GAME; Tokyo (May 28)
2016	North Kanto Overheat Fire	Lead performer	Nagoya Fushimi JAMMIN; Aichi (June 4) & Esaka MUSE; Osaka (June 5)
2016	INSOLENCE JAPAN TOUR 2016	Lead performer	Shibuya THE GAME (June 9), Nagoya RAD HALL; Aichi (June 11) & Harbor Studio; Kobe (June 12)
2016	PALOOZA Thanksgiving THE45th.~P Seitansai~	Lead performer	Kashiwa PALOOZA (July 18)
2016	INKT SUMMER CIRCUIT Live 2016	Lead performer	5 shows in Gakugeidaigaku Maple House from July 3–31
2016	JUNGLE LIFE×CLUB251 presents “Whiteboard Jungle”	Lead performer	Shimokitazawa CLUB251; Tokyo (July 28)
2016	UZMK presents "Effected ☆ fuck ups" vs America-mura DROP 13th Anniversary live	Guest performer	America-mura DROP; Osaka (August 7 & 8)
2016	Muscle King Party Vol.3	Lead performer	TSUTAYA O-WEST (August 22)
2016	"King Chimera" live	Guest performer	Shibuya Clubasia; Tokyo (September 21)
2016	BIG BOMBER CAMP 2016 - TOKYO 7	Lead performer	Shibuya REX; Shibuya (October 6)
2016	INKT Live House tour 2016	Lead performer	total of 16 shows in various venues across Japan from October 1 - November 19, with a special additional "Xmas night" show at Kashiwa PALOOZA in Chiba on December 14
2016	Heart Town Festival 2016	Guest performer	Taichung Intercontinental Baseball Stadium; Taichung, Taiwan (November 26)
2016	UCHUSENTAI: NOIZ presents "BIG BOMBER CAMP 2016	Guest performer	Nagoya ell.FITS ALL; Nagoya (November 30)
2016	Beach Walker 2016	Guest performer	Harbor Studio; Kobe (December 9)
2016	Pulse Factory presents "Life with a mortality rate of 100%" live	Guest performer	Umeda Zeela; Osaka (December 10)
2016	Tokyo Lalara vol. 6	Guest performer	Hatsudai DOORS; Tokyo (December 16)
2016	Gacharic Spin × INKT live	Lead performer	Nagoya ell.FITS ALL (December 22)
2016	TONEAYU Presents "watered down PARTY! ~ Lack of oxygen speeding the old year SPECIAL ~"	Lead performer	Shibuya GUILTY; Shibuya (December 29)
2016	PALOOZA presents "Brand New Vibe Road to Zepp Divercity Special Countdown Party to 2017"	Guest performer	Kashiwa PALOOZA (December 31)
2017	KING presents "KING OF ROCK SHOW New Year Special	Guest performer	Kashiwa PALOOZA (January 7)
2017	L & P Attractive presents "All Happiness !! Extra edition" [Sushi Fest]	Guest performer	Osu RAD HALL; Nagoya (February 3)
2017	Nagoya Large Circuit Festival RAD CREATION presents "Tora Rock Festival 2017"	Guest performer	this festival had several shows at various different venues in Aichi Prefecture, but INKT only guest performed at 1 show on February 4
2017	Muscle King Party ~ MTR Birthday Festival ~	Guest performer	TSUTAYA O-WEST (February 16)
2017	"Wicked!!!" live	Guest performer	Daikanyama LOOP; Tokyo (February 17)
2017	Palooza presents "Bakugan Festival"	Lead performer	Kashiwa PALOOZA (February 25)
2017	HateItOrLoveIt & Club Lizard Yokohama Presents "Rabbit's Revenge Vol.4" Club Lizard 15th Anniversary & Closure live	Guest performer	Club Lizard; Yokohama (March 10)
2017	INKT Live house tour 2017	Lead performer	almost 50 shows held at many different venues across Japan from March 4 - July 23
2017	PALOOZA meets WHITE SHADOW "SHADOW NET" live	Lead performer	Kashiwa PALOOZA (May 11)
2017	Knock Out Kashiwa Idiot" live	Lead performer	Kashiwa PALOOZA (December 31)
2018	Hide tribute 2018	Guest performer	Kashiwa PALOOZA (May 5 & 6)
2019	Tanaka Koki presents Easter TOUR 2019	Lead performer	Koki Tanaka's first national solo tour held at various venues across Japan from February 2 to April 6.
2019	The Last Day of Heisei! Epikkus FES!	Guest performer	Zepp DiverCity TOKYO (April 30)
2019	Natsu no Mamono by SILLYTHING	Guest performer	Tokyo CLUB LINER (June 2)
2019	KOKI TANAKA "THE ONE MAN ~ 0 ~"	Lead performer	Tanaka's one-man live tour with 3 shows held in Tokyo, Osaka and Aichi from August 3–11
2019	Reiwa First Summer	Lead performer	Shibuya Eggman; Tokyo (August 31)
2019	Natsu no Mamono 2019	Guest performer	Saitama Tobu Zoo (September 28)
2019	KOKI TANAKA "LOUDER" tour	Lead performer	Tanaka's national live tour with 14 shows held across Japan from October 5 to November 4

=== Stage shows ===
Year	Title	Role
2001 - 2003	Dream Boys	Dancer
2002	Shock	Dancer
2004	Dream Boys	Supporting role & dancer
2006	Summary of Johnny's World	Main cast
2007	Dream Boys	Lead role
2008	Dream Boys	Lead role
2011	Dream Boys	Lead role
2021	OLD Maid-JOKER	Lead role, writer & director

== Filmography ==
=== Film ===
Year	Title	Role
2000	Colorful	main role
2012	Ooku ~ Eien	supporting role
2014	Sanbun no Ichi (One Third)	main role

=== Television ===
TV series
Year	Broadcast	Title	Role
1999	NTV	Nekketsu Ren-ai Dou	
1999	NTV	Kowai Nichiyobi	
1999	NTV	Kowai Nichiyobi ~Shinsho~	
2000	NTV	Tenshi ga Kieta Machi	
2000	NTV	Kowai Nichiyobi 2000	
2001	TBS	Never Land	Shigehisa Iwatsuki (supporting role)
2006	NTV	Takusan no Ai wo Arigato	
2006	NTV	My Boss My Hero	Kazuya Manabe (main role)
2006	NTV	Tatta Hitotsu no Koi	Kou Kusano (main role)
2007	NTV	Tokkyu Tanaka San Go	Ichiro Tanaka (lead role)
2009	TV Asahi	Hissatsu Shigotonin 2009	Ren (main role, episodes 13 - 22)
2012	TBS	Ooku ~ Tanjou	Gyokuei (main role)
Drama SPs (special TV movies)
Year	Broadcast	Title	Role
2005	NTV	Kindaichi Shōnen no Jikenbo 2005	supporting role
2007	TV Asahi	Byakkotai	Gisaburo Shinoda & Yusuke Shinoda (main role)
2010	NTV	Rikon Syndrome (Divorce Syndrome)	main role
2010	TV Asahi	Hissatsu Shigotonin 2010 SP	Ren (main role)
2012	TV Asahi	Hissatsu Shigotonin 2012	Ren (main role)
2013	TV Asahi	Hissatsu Shigotonin 2013	Ren (main role)

== Other works ==
=== Books ===
- 田中聖 10845: Released on July 15, 2015.

== Awards ==
- 50th Television Drama Academy Awards: Best Supporting Actor for My Boss My Hero (2006).
- 2006 TVNavi Awards: Best Newcomer for My Boss My Hero (2006).
