= Mary Yasuko Fujishima =

Japanese businessperson and promoter (1926–2021)

- Born: Mary Kitagawa; December 26, 1927; Los Angeles, California, United States
- Died: August 14, 2021 (aged 93); Tokyo, Japan
- Education: Los Angeles City College
- Occupations: Businessperson; promoter
- Years active: 1962–2019
- Known for: Vice president of Johnny & Associates
- Spouse: Taisuke Fujishima
- Children: Julie Keiko Fujishima
- Parent: Taido Kitagawa (father)
- Relatives: Johnny Kitagawa (brother)

Mary Yasuko Fujishima (Japanese: 藤島メリー泰子, Hepburn: Fujishima Merī Yasuko; December 26, 1927 – August 14, 2021), also known professionally by her birth name, Mary Kitagawa (メリー 喜多川, Merī Kitagawa), was a Japanese businessperson and promoter. Fujishima was the vice president of Johnny & Associates, a talent agency founded by her younger brother Johnny Kitagawa, from its foundation in 1962 to 2019. After 2019, she retired and became the honorary chairperson of Johnny & Associates until her death in 2021.

Fujishima's aggressive business practices were credited for the success of Johnny & Associates, including the development of the fan clubs of their boy bands. She was the manager of Johnnys and Four Leaves; she was also influential in the development of boy bands such as Tanokin Trio, Shibugakitai, Hikaru Genji, SMAP, Tokio, and Arashi. Nicknamed the company's "matriarch", Fujishima was known for being protective over the company's image and would combat any unfavorable media coverage, including covering up the sexual abuse scandal of Johnny Kitagawa throughout his lifetime.

== Early life ==
Mary Yasuko Fujishima was born Mary Kitagawa in Los Angeles, California, on December 26, 1927. Her father was Taido Kitagawa, a Buddhist monk for Koyasan Buddhist Temple. She was the older sister of Johnny Kitagawa. According to Hiroshi Kosuga, a writer of several books about the Kitagawa family and a close acquaintance of Fujishima, Fujishima was a "mother figure" to Johnny, having taken care of him since their mother died when she was seven years old and he was two years old. Kosuga noted that she seemed to be aware of Johnny's sexuality, but she would shut down any conversation about it.

Fujishima's family moved to Japan but returned to the United States after World War II. She then attended and graduated from Los Angeles City College. After returning to Japan in the 1950s, she opened a snack bar called Spot with Ryōichi Hattori's wife. She married writer Taisuke Fujishima, and, together, they have one daughter, Julie Keiko Fujishima.

== Career ==
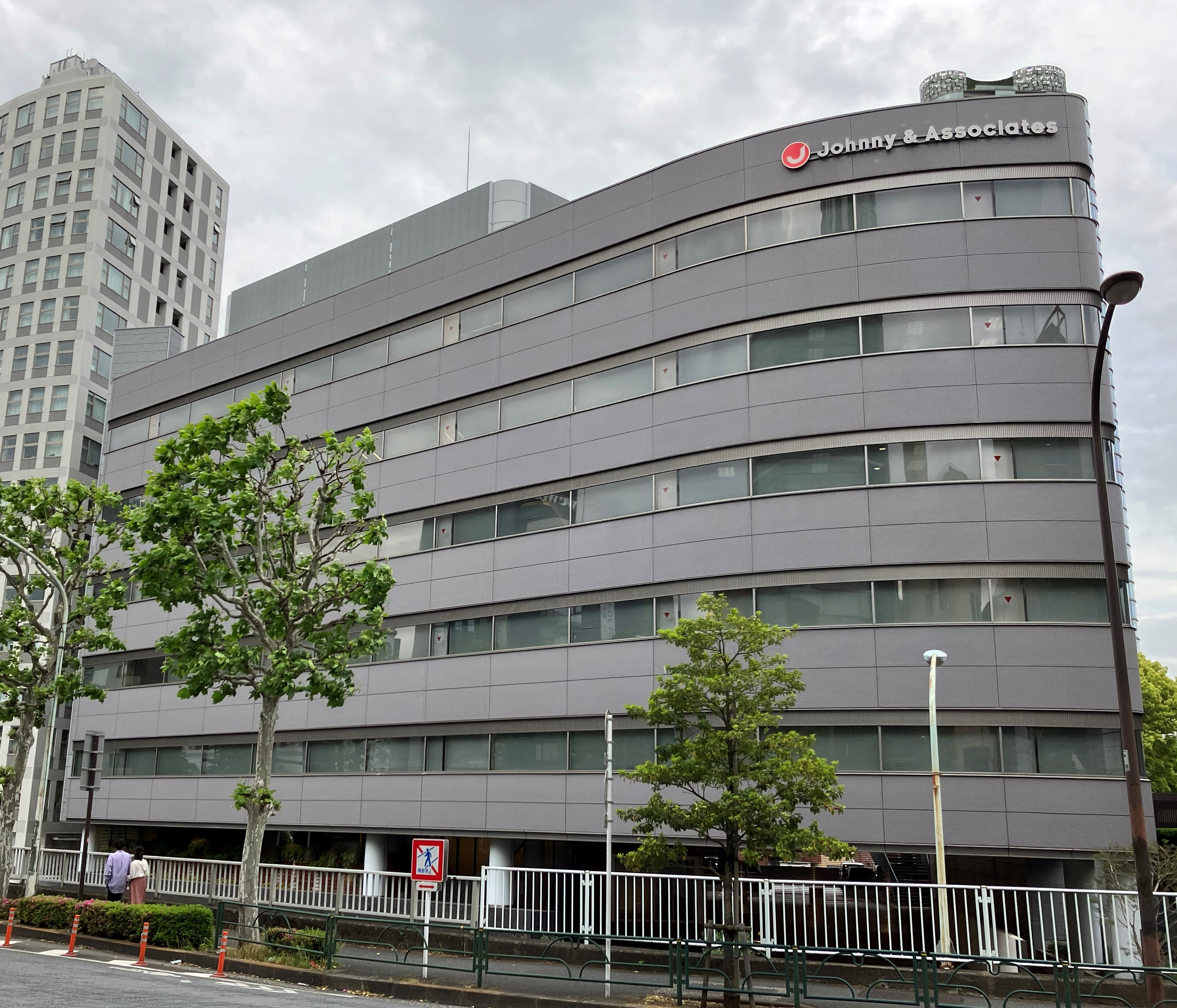
Fujishima helped Johnny Kitagawa launch Johnny & Associates (pictured in 2023) and served as vice president from 1962 to 2019.

In 1962, Fujishima helped Johnny Kitagawa launch his talent agency Johnny & Associates. She served as the company's vice president and managed its business affairs. Fujishima was the manager for the company's first boy bands, Johnnys and Four Leaves. She then helped develop later acts, including Tanokin Trio, Shibugakitai, Hikaru Genji, SMAP, Tokio, and Arashi. Fujishima was also heavily involved in managing the fan clubs of the company's acts. According to writer Hiroshi Kosuga, he described Fujishima as someone with strong networking skills, and she would regularly invite television station executives over to her apartment for dinner. Both Kosuga and writer Kazuhiko Nita believed Johnny & Associates became successful in part due to Fujishima's business management skills, while Johnny focused on scouting talent. Fujishima rarely made public appearances.

Fujishima was viewed as a "matriarch" by the acts employed within Johnny & Associates, which Kosuga stated extended to the company's culture. By extension, Fujishima would refer to the company's acts as "her children", and their fan clubs were built on the concept of "family"; consequently, Fujishima viewed acts who leave Johnny & Associates negatively and would blacklist them from making media appearances with current Johnny & Associates members.

Fujishima was fiercely protective over Johnny & Associates would aggressively combat any unfavorable media coverage about Johnny or any act employed within the company. Notably, Fujishima reportedly had mainstream media stop reporting an infidelity scandal involving Masahiko Kondō, a known favorite employee of hers, that had resulted with Akina Nakamori's suicide attempt; in addition, she orchestrated a press conference between Kondō and Nakamori with the intention of only salvaging Kondō's public image. Over the span of Johnny's lifetime, Fujishima actively covered up his sexual abuse of young boys.

On January 29, 2015, through an interview with Shūkan Bunshun, Fujishima named her daughter, Julie Keiko Fujishima, as Johnny & Associates' successor. At the same time, Fujishima allegedly had an intense rivalry with Michi Iijima, the manager of SMAP and head of J Dream, the company's subsidiary dedicated to managing the aforementioned boy band. In the same interview, Fujishima had invited Iijima and stated to her, "If you're against it, I'll have you take SMAP and leave starting today." Their rivalry, compounded with Fujishima's interview, reportedly influenced Iijima to leave the company and media to report that four members of SMAP were considering also leaving and disbanding the group.

In September 2019, Fujishima retired from Johnny & Associates and became the company's honorary chairperson, while Julie Keiko Fujishima took over the company.

== Death ==
Fujishima died on August 14, 2021, from pneumonia, in a hospital in Tokyo, Japan. A private memorial service was held with her close relatives.
