= Johnny Kitagawa =

Japanese talent manager and sex offender (1931–2019)

- ジャニー喜多川
- Born: John Hiromu Kitagawa; October 23, 1931; Los Angeles, California, U.S.
- Died: July 9, 2019 (aged 87); Shibuya, Tokyo, Japan
- Citizenship: United States (jus soli); Japan
- Occupations: Business magnate; promoter; record producer
- Known for: Founder of Johnny & Associates; Johnny Kitagawa sexual abuse scandal
- Parent: Taido Kitagawa (father)
- Relatives: Mary Yasuko Fujishima (sister); Taisuke Fujishima (brother-in-law); Julie Keiko Fujishima (niece)
- Musical career
- Genre: J-pop
- Years active: 1962–2019
- Military service
- Branch: United States Army
- Service years: 1952–1953

John Hiromu Kitagawa (Japanese name Hiromu Kitagawa; (Note: Japanese: 喜多川 擴) October 23, 1931 – July 9, 2019), known professionally as Johnny Kitagawa, (Note: Japanese: ジャニー喜多川, Hepburn: Janī Kitagawa) was a Japanese business magnate, promoter, and record producer. He was best known as the founder of Johnny & Associates, a talent agency for numerous popular boy bands in Japan. In 2023, after his death, a BBC documentary, Predator: The Secret Scandal of J-Pop, reignited discussion of allegations that he had taken advantage of his position to engage in improper sexual relationships with boys under contract to his talent agency. This led to an independent probe which concluded that Kitagawa had "repeated and widely" abused boys in his organizations since the 1970s.

Kitagawa assembled, produced and managed more than a dozen popular bands, including Tanokin Trio, Hey! Say! JUMP, SMAP, Arashi, Kanjani8, V6, NEWS and KAT-TUN. Kitagawa's influence spread beyond music to the realms of theatre and television. Regarded as one of the most powerful figures in the Japanese entertainment industry, he held a virtual monopoly on the creation of boy bands in Japan for more than 40 years. Kitagawa also founded the idol trainee system, where talents are signed on to the agency and trained until they are ready to debut professionally, which has been adopted by other idol industries. Kitagawa himself avoided the public spotlight. He rarely permitted his photograph to be taken, and did not make public appearances with his groups. He held the Guinness World Records for the most No. 1 artists, the most No. 1 singles, and the most concerts produced by an individual. A memorial concert was held after his death in 2019, with 154 of Kitagawa's artists and other celebrities in attendance. Until the release of the documentary in 2023, he remained highly regarded in Japan after his death.

From 1988 to 2000, Kitagawa was the subject of a number of allegations that he had taken advantage of his position to engage in improper sexual relationships with boys under contract to his talent agency, though no criminal charges were ever filed against him. In 2023, four years after his death, those allegations became publicized more widely after the BBC documentary and the subsequent independent probe which identified Kitagawa as a sex offender active from the early 1970s until the mid-2010s, who raped hundreds of boys who were members of his talent agency before their debut. As of 2023, a reported number of 478 persons have claimed to have been victimized by Kitagawa, of those, 325 sought compensation, and 150 have been confirmed to have belonged in the company. Later in the year, Johnny & Associates announced its name would change to SMILE UP, and that anything bearing the name "Johnny", such as related companies and performing groups, would be changed to remove Kitagawa's name.

== Early life ==
John Hiromu Kitagawa was born in 1931 in Los Angeles, he was a United States citizen by birth. He returned with his family to Japan in 1933. His father, Rev. Taido Kitagawa, was a Buddhist priest and the third head bishop of the Koyasan Buddhist Temple in Little Tokyo from 1924 to 1933. His older sister was Mary Yasuko Fujishima. Kitagawa taught English to orphans from the Korean War for the United States Army. In the early 1950s, he returned to Japan to work at the United States Embassy. While walking through Yoyogi Park in Tokyo, he encountered a group of boys playing baseball. He recruited them to form a singing group, acting as their manager. He named the group "Johnnys".

Johnnys achieved a measure of success by using a then-novel formula of mixing attractive performers singing popular music with coordinated dance routines. Johnnys were the first all-male pop group in Japan, and set the pattern that Kitagawa followed with his subsequent acts. The term "Johnny's" came to apply generically to any of the performers under Kitagawa's employ. Concurrently, he graduated from Sophia University and received his bachelor's degree in International Studies.

== Career ==
=== Founding Johnny & Associates ===
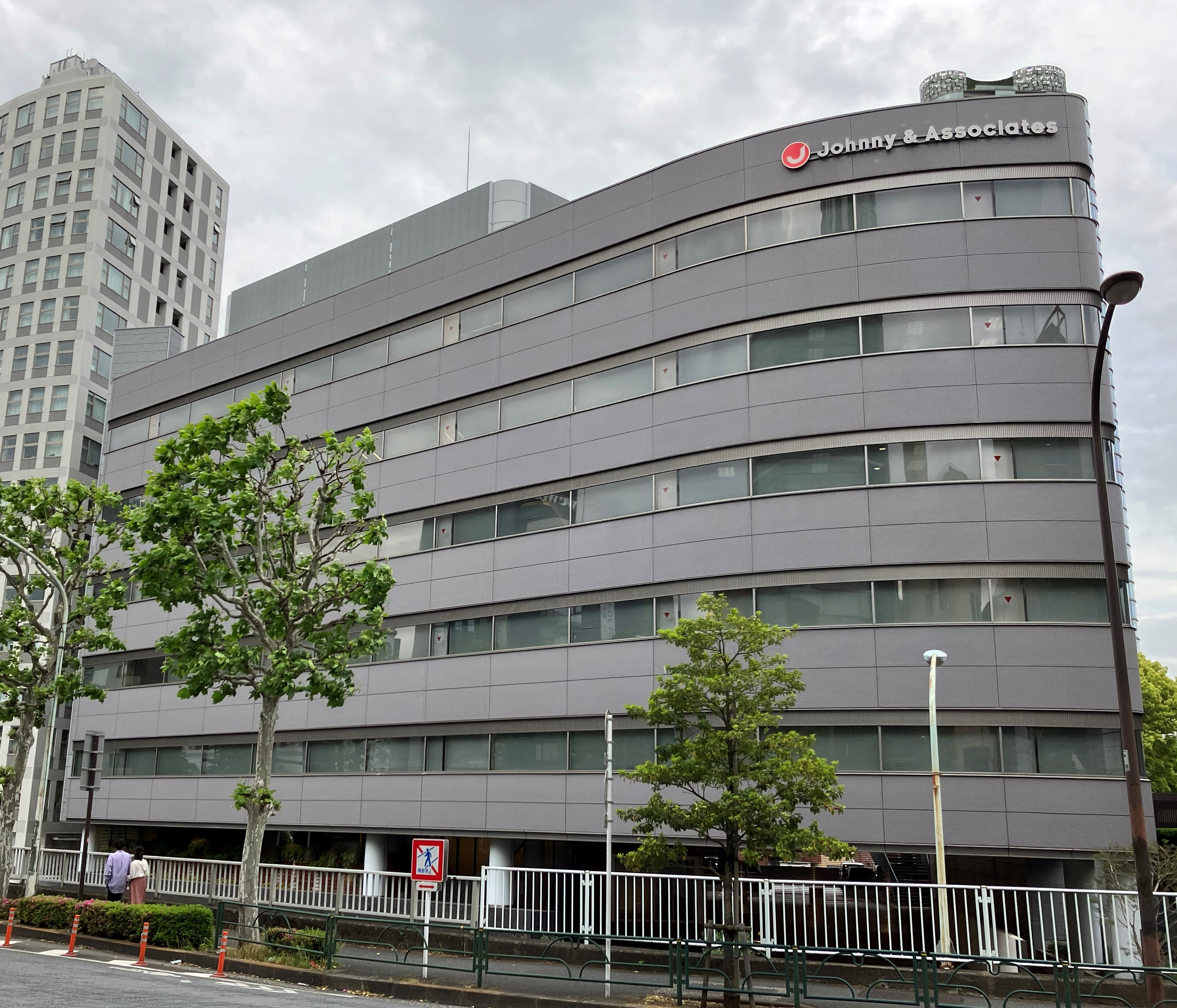
Headquarters of Johnny & Associates

In 1968, Kitagawa achieved wider success with a four-member boy band known as Four Leaves. The song and dance group met with success, as reflected by seven consecutive appearances on the annual invitation-only Kōhaku Uta Gassen, beginning in 1970. Four Leaves performed together for ten years before disbanding in 1978. In 2002, Kitagawa oversaw the band's reunion. Kitagawa went on to assemble, produce and manage many of the top all-male bands in Japan, including groups such as Hey! Say! JUMP, SMAP, Tokio, V6, Arashi, Tackey & Tsubasa, Kanjani8, NEWS, KAT-TUN, and KinKi Kids among many others.

Kitagawa was able to expand his sphere of influence to television, as his performers regularly appeared on television, with many appearing on their own variety programs. They regularly acted as pitchmen for commercial products, and appeared in movies. The success of Kitagawa's performers led to increased profitability, and Johnny & Associates generated 2.9 billion yen in annual profits at the height of the boy band boom. In 1997, performers belonging to the talent agency appeared in more than 40 television programs, and another 40 commercials. The success of his company made Kitagawa one of the richest men in Japan. He held the Guinness World Records for the most No. 1 artists, the most No. 1 singles, and the most concerts produced by an individual.

=== The formula ===
Kitagawa repeatedly employed a standard formula in the development and marketing of his acts. Johnny & Associates held open tryouts for potential performers. The production agency recruited boys as young as ten into a talent pool known as Johnny's Juniors. Successful applicants lived in a company dormitory and attended a company-run school. They trained to hone their showmanship in the form of singing, dancing and acting. Kitagawa held an annual summer festival known as "Johnny's Summary".

I'm not very interested in records. Once you release a record, you have to sell that record. You have to push one song only. You can't think of anything else. It's not good for the artist.

— Johnny Kitagawa, June 1996

Promising members of Johnny's Jr. appeared alongside established members of Kitagawa's stable of entertainers. The junior members acted as background dancers for the major acts, to allow for name recognition prior to being launched as a separate group. The members of the Juniors appeared in on Hachi-ji da J, a weekly television variety show. Members sang, danced, and performed in comedic sketches as they further developed the skills to graduate to a major act.

Kitagawa's focus was on the development of his groups as complete entertainers. Shonentai, for example, did not release a single until it had been together for more than seven years. In a 1996 interview, Kitagawa said "I'm not very interested in records. Once you release a record, you have to sell that record. You have to push one song only. You can't think of anything else. It's not good for the artist."

Once launched, Kitagawa was known to use his established groups to induce television stations to report on his newer acts, and ensure favorable press coverage for his acts and himself. Programs that gave unfavorable coverage did not receive interviews or television appearance from popular stars managed by Kitagawa. Kitagawa maintained a high degree of control over his acts, to the extent that their images did not appear on the company website. Performers were expected to maintain a public image that was conducive to marketing to young women. As a result, members of bands produced by Kitagawa avoided public mention of their private lives. Kitagawa himself avoided the public spotlight. He rarely permitted his photograph to be taken, and did not make public appearances with his groups.

== Death ==
On July 9, 2019, Kitagawa died at a hospital in Tokyo after suffering a subarachnoid hemorrhage stroke on June 18, at the age of 87. A memorial concert was held on September 4, 2019, at the Tokyo Dome, with 154 of Johnny's artists and other celebrities in attendance, including Akiko Wada and Dewi Sukarno. His body was cremated, and his ashes were distributed to several people, including Masahiro Nakai.

Following Kitagawa's death in 2019, Johnny & Associates began expanding accessibility for their talent. This included the opening of an official Twitter account for itself (which shared information about Johnny's talent, mostly in English), as well as different social media accounts for the artists.

== Sexual abuse by Kitagawa ==
=== Allegations made during Kitagawa's lifetime ===
In the early 1960s, Kitagawa was accused of sexually assaulting students at Shin Geino Gakuin, a talent training school located in Toshima Ward, Tokyo. In 1988, former Four Leaves member Koji Kita alleged in his book Dear Hikaru Genji that he had been propositioned by Kitagawa and that Kitagawa operated a casting couch. In 1989, Johnnys member Ryo Nakatani published similar allegations in his book Johnny's Revenge. In 1996, former Johnny Jr.'s member Junya Hiramoto alleged in his book All About Johnnys that Kitagawa shared the boys' communal dormitory and insisted on washing their backs at bath time.

In 2001, Shūkan Bunshun ran a series of similar sexual harassment allegations along with claims that Kitagawa had allegedly forced the boys to drink alcohol and smoke. Johnny & Associates sued Shukan Bunshun for defamation, and in 2002, the Tokyo District Court ruled in favor of Kitagawa, awarding him ¥8.8 million in damages. In 2003, the fine was lowered to ¥1.2 million on the basis that the drinking and smoking allegations were defamatory, while the sexual harassment claims were not. Kitagawa filed an appeal to the Supreme Court of Japan. It was rejected in 2004. The case saw minimal coverage in Japan, with many journalists attributing it to Kitagawa's influence on Japanese mass media. In 2023, The Asahi Shimbun speculated that the Japanese media also initially did not take the news seriously because men were not seen as sexual assault victims at the time and thus the news was seen as "gossip"; and because Shūkan Bunshun had lost the initial lawsuit. Altogether, there were at least eight books and magazine articles about the abuse before the 2023 BBC documentary.

=== Sexual abuse scandal ===
In March 2023, the BBC released a documentary centered on the sexual abuse claims against Kitagawa, Predator: The Secret Scandal of J-Pop, presented by Mobeen Azhar, who investigated why public opinion of him was still favourable at the time. Azhar started researching the topic in 2019 following Kitagawa's death. Throughout production of this documentary, Azhar and Inman stated that, with the exception of Shūkan Bunshun, Japanese media and industry professionals generally declined to talk to them, and they were advised multiple times not to create the documentary. In response to the documentary, Johnny & Associates stated that they were creating "transparent organizational structures" that would be announced later in the year.

In April 2023, musician and former Johnny's Jr. member Kauan Okamoto told a press conference held at the Foreign Correspondents' Club of Japan that he had been subjected to sexual abuse by Kitagawa on a number of occasions between 2012 and 2016, and called on the management to acknowledge the misconduct. Okamoto estimated that between 100 and 200 boys were invited to Kitagawa's home during his time at Johnny's, and claimed that when Kitagawa told one of his guests to go to bed early, everyone knew "it was your turn". In response to Okamoto's press conference, Johnny & Associates released a statement saying that it would "continue its unified effort to thoroughly ensure compliance without exception, and tackle strengthening of a system of governance," but the company did not directly address the allegations at the time. Later that month, NHK reported that Johnny & Associates was interviewing their employees and talent, and had sent a document out to business partners saying that they were looking into the allegations. The document said that the company took the allegations seriously and that their investigations so far had uncovered no cases of misconduct, adding that they were aware that such in-house interviews were not enough to uncover the truth. After the press conference, NHK reported on the abuse on April 13. This was the first television report on the scandal by NHK.

On May 14, 2023, Julie Keiko Fujishima, Kitagawa's niece and president of Johnny & Associates, issued an apology to those who had alleged sexual abuse by Kitagawa. She added that she was committed to implementing measures addressing the victims' needs. Two days after Johnny & Associates released their statement, Okamoto and former Johnny's Jr. Yasushi Hashida, attended a parliamentary meeting at the National Diet organized by the Constitutional Democratic Party. Hashida said that he was sexually abused around twice by Kitagawa when he was 13 years old. Both Hashida and Okamoto credited coverage of the sexual abuse allegations by the foreign press as being key to paving the way for its coverage in the domestic press.

In July 2023, the United Nations Human Rights Council investigated Kitagawa's abuse at the agency. An independent probe established by Johnny & Associates reported the findings of their investigation on August 29, 2023, saying that Kitagawa repeatedly committed sexual abuse from the early 1970s until the mid-2010s. On September 7, 2023, Johnny & Associates formally acknowledged Kitagawa's abuse for the first time.

A follow-up program by the BBC aired in 2024, called Our World: The Shadow of a Predator, continued with a further look at the case that got almost 1000 claims made. The program included exclusive interviews with Smile-Up's new president, Higashiyama, as well as Akimasa Nihongi, a former agency talent, and the widow of one of the victims. In the program. Higashiyama said that he has no formal training or experience in counseling or helping survivors, but he hopes that after talking to close to 200 victims personally, “... it will help to mend their hearts, even just a little." Higashiyama confirmed that he had heard about two other perpetrators, but he did not report the fact to the police.

Nihongi went public with his allegations, after seeing the story reported in 2023. He believes that there is still some secrecy around the issue. He said, "I want them to take responsibility. I think this is the biggest post-war sexual assault case in Japan. We shouldn't let it fade away as if it's a temporary problem. It's important to keep a record as part of Japanese history." According to the other interviewee, her husband suffered from online harassment and death threats after revealing the abuse. She received a message from her husband, telling her that he would retire to the mountains where a search party found his body. One of the consequences of the case is that Prime Minister Fumio Kishida faced increasing pressure to reform sexual abuse legislation, shifting the age of consent in Japan from 13 to 16, after multiple rape acquittals in 2019 and the increase of men reporting sexual abuse.

On April 25, 2024, Smile Up posted a letter they sent to the BBC on their site, protesting the editing of Higashiyama's words in the program and a long edition of the interview, saying that "what was broadcast was different from the actual purpose of Higashiyama's remarks", promoting slander instead of preventing it. They also pointed to a lack of professionalism in the interviews with the victims. Those victims had agreed to an interview, so the interviewers could gain a better understanding of the case, agreeing in having it if the facts and content of the information were not revealed within the program or in any other media, and yet, the content was revealed not only in the program, but also in the press conference held at the Foreign Correspondents' Club of Japan with the program's host and producers on April 10. In their letter, Smile Up demanded a correction and apology. On May 3, 2024, the BBC responded to Smile Up's demand, via Twitter with a written statement, saying: "This documentary was rigorously researched and reported in line with the BBC's strict editorial guidelines... We ensured that all contributors, including Mr. Higashiyama, were represented fairly and accurately and included all necessary rights of reply." The statement added, "The BBC did not agree to any restrictions in what could be discussed during the meeting set up by Smile-Up with survivors and rejects this assertion."

On October 20, 2024, the documentary "NHK Special: Johnny Kitagawa: The Reality of the 'Idol Empire'" aired on NHK. The sister of Ryo Nakatani, a member of the first group of claimants who died in 2021, asked for the agency to extend an apology, and for Noriyuki Higashiyama, as the representative, to do it. On October 25, Smile-Up posted on its site that Higashiyama, indeed, had visited the family in September, and had apologized in the name of the agency.

==== Aftermath ====
On September 6, 2023, Guinness World Records decided to remove Kitagawa's achievement of producing the most top songs on the pop music chart from its official website. However, they did not eliminate his record titles, as he was never convicted. This decision was accepted as a wise decision by the newly appointed president of Johnny & Associates, Higashiyama. Companies such as Suntory and McDonald's which had previously contracted with Johnny & Associates for advertising or promotional campaigns decided to either retract or not renew their contracts with Johnny's artists as a response to Kitagawa's scandal. Suntory demanded plans of prevention and reparations for the victims as prerequisites of reestablishing partnership.

Several major news outlets, including NHK, issued mea culpas in recognition of their years of silence that effectively allowed Kitagawa's sexual abuses to continue unabated. Bungeishunjū and Mobeen Azhar were awarded in 2023 by the Foreign Correspondents' Club of Japan (FCCJ) for their coverage of the scandal. The FCCJ likened this scandal to the assassination of Shinzo Abe, citing media silence on the systemic abuses by organizations close to powerful figures.

==== Company renaming ====
Several Japanese news outlets reported on October 1, 2023 that Johnny & Associates was considering creating a new company to manage its performers, while the current Johnny & Associates would change its name and continue to exist for the purpose of compensating abuse victims. It was also reported that Noriyuki Higashiyama, who became the head of Johnny & Associates after the resignation of Julie K. Fujishima, was also expected to head the new company. On October 2, Johnny & Associates held a press conference to announcing that they would be renaming the current company to SMILE UP–taking a name that they had used in their 2020 charity project–effective October 17. SMILE UP will continue to exist under the ownership of Fujishima and will eventually close down once all sexual abuse compensation requests, which numbered 325 at the time of the announcement, have been processed.

Higashiyama told reporters that performers working under the new, yet-to-be-named management company "will have the freedom to pursue their own career paths without being restricted or entirely dependent on the company." It was also announced that anything bearing the name "Johnny", such as related companies and company sections like Johnny's Island and J-Storm and performing groups such as Johnny's West and Kanjani Eight, would undergo changes to remove any trace of the Johnny's name. Higashiyama said that "all things with the Johnny's name will have to go," while Fujishima, who did not attend the October 2 press conference, said that she wanted to "erase all that remains of Johnny from this world." While initially Higashiyama was supposed to take the reins of the new company, on a conference given on 30 October, Higashiyama cancelled his appointment, and Atsushi Fukuda, president of Speedy, a consulting company, stepped up as the new president.

It was revealed on December 8, 2023, that the new artist management company would be called Starto Entertainment, a name fusing the word "star" and the hiragana と (to), with the meaning for the latter to be "toward the future". The name of the new company was decided after reviewing 140,156 fan applications. As said previously, Higashiyama was to replace Fujishima in both the new artist management company, as well as in the presidency of the original, but Higashiyama declined the role in the new one. Fukuda was appointed as president of Starto.

==== Lawsuits ====
In December 2024 two former Johnny & Associates talent filed a lawsuit in the United States against Smile-Up and Starto Entertainment seeking US$300 million in damages, in what was reported to be the first litigation by Kitagawa's victims. The lawsuit was filed in Clark County, Nevada by plaintiffs Junya Tanaka and Kyōhei Iida who alleged that Kitagawa sexually abused them in a Las Vegas hotel when they were teenagers in March 1997 and August 2002, respectively. The lawsuit also alleged that Julie Keiko Fujishima (Kitagawa's niece) and other former company executives were aware of the abuse, but failed to take appropriate action. Iida said in a statement that a "fundamental shift in societal awareness" was crucial to ensure such incidents are never repeated, while Tanaka said he wished to make people aware that speaking out against this kind of abuse had been suppressed in Japan for decades. Smile-Up said in response to the lawsuit that they would consult with lawyers in the United States, adding their belief that a U.S. court should not have jurisdiction over the matter because the plaintiffs lived in Japan at the time. Starto Entertainment claimed that their company was not related to the case, and there was no reason for them to be sued. An American lawyer representing Tanaka and Iida told NHK that the case is not subject to any statute of limitations in the state of Nevada.

In February 2025, Smile-Up filed their own lawsuit against Iida and Tanaka, and two other claimants. Smile-Up's lawsuit said the three victims' refusal to accept the framework should absolve the company of paying compensation to them. For the other victim, the company is seeking confirmation that it has no obligation to pay more than the amount of compensation offered by the relief committee. Tanaka and Iida held a press conference on February 6. At the news conference, Tanaka emphasized that Smile-Up’s lawsuit was filed shortly after it became clear that the company had been sued in the United States. Yuko Atsumi, a lawyer representing the victims, said Smile-Up is unilaterally imposing its own framework on the victims. She also said the lawsuit could be a means of preventing victims from taking legal action in the United States. A representative of Smile-Up told the Asahi Shimbun that the company intends to proceed with compensation payments in accordance with decisions of the victims relief committee. In November 2024, the company sued Shimon Ishimaru, 57, the former deputy chief of the Johnny’s Sexual Assault Victims Association which dissolved in September 2024. The company is seeking confirmation that it does not have to pay more than 18 million yen in damages to Ishimaru, the figure proposed by the victims relief committee.

On October 31, 2024, Bunshun reported on the case of the man who had appeared on NHK's "News 7" broadcast on October 9, 2023. According to the report, the man had claimed that Kitagawa had assaulted him a total of five times in a private room inside the men's restroom in the NHK Broadcasting Center, after he had auditioned to appear on NHK's "Shonen Club". The man met twice with the compensation officer and corporate lawyer of Smile-Up, but was unable to explain the location of the toilet, its layout, or the procedure for entering the Broadcasting Center. There were also questions about how he applied for the audition. Smile-Up filed a lawsuit against him and refused to provide compensation, arguing that Kitagawa was not in Japan at the time the man claimed to have been assaulted. They said they had filed the lawsuit to seek confirmation that the company had no obligation to compensate the man, stating that the truth of the testimony needed to be made clear. At the first oral argument held at the Chiba District Court on the 10, the man's lawyer commented, "There is no change to the man's statement that he was sexually assaulted, but since the statute of limitations has already expired, we do not dispute that Smile-Up is not obligated to pay damages".

On March 14, 2025, Smile-Up posted on their site an update regarding the lawsuits in which they are involved. Out of 557 cases which have been attended to, 545 people were paid compensation (around the 99% of the total) and 9 people have been dealt with by civil court or civil mediation. In the case of the company being the plaintiff, the company filed suits against a total of six people. Two people had their enrollment record and damage report confirmed but did not agree with the amount offered by the Victim Relief Committee while three had their enrollment record confirmed and are seeking compensation but did not respond to the request to use the compensation framework by the Victim Relief Committee. One person did not confirm the accuracy of the contents of the damage report so the case was dismissed. In the case of the company being defendants, a total of 3 people filed civil lawsuits against the company. They notified these people that they would not be providing compensation because they are unable to confirm their employment history or the veracity of their damage reports. "For those whose damage reports cannot be confirmed, including these three individuals, we believe it is necessary to prevent false reports in order to ensure the fairness of the compensation framework in the future. Therefore, we will not necessarily provide detailed information on the reasons for our decision. However, when we receive inquiries, we have explained the reasons to the extent possible, and if new evidence or testimony is submitted, we will reconsider the matter based on the content of the evidence. We will wait for the complaint to be served on us regarding the lawsuit filed by these three individuals, and will respond sincerely to the court proceedings. In addition to these three individuals, we have received reports that two individuals, one in (1) and one in (2), out of the six individuals against whom we filed a civil lawsuit as described above, have filed lawsuits against us in the United States. However, we believe that the jurisdiction of the United States is not recognized."
