= Predator: The Secret Scandal of J-Pop =

2023 British television documentary

- Genre: Documentary
- Directed by: Megumi Inman
- Presented by: Mobeen Azhar
- Starring: Mobeen Azhar
- Country of origin: United Kingdom
- Original language: English

Production
- Executive producer: Sarah Waldron
- Producer: Megumi Inman

Original release
- Network: BBC Two
- Release: 7 March 2023

Predator: The Secret Scandal of J-Pop is a British television documentary presented by journalist Mobeen Azhar. The documentary is centred on the sexual abuse involving Japanese record producer Johnny Kitagawa, the founder of the talent company Johnny & Associates and an influential figure in the Japanese entertainment industry. It was broadcast as part of the documentary series This World in the United Kingdom on BBC Two on 7 March 2023.

== Summary ==
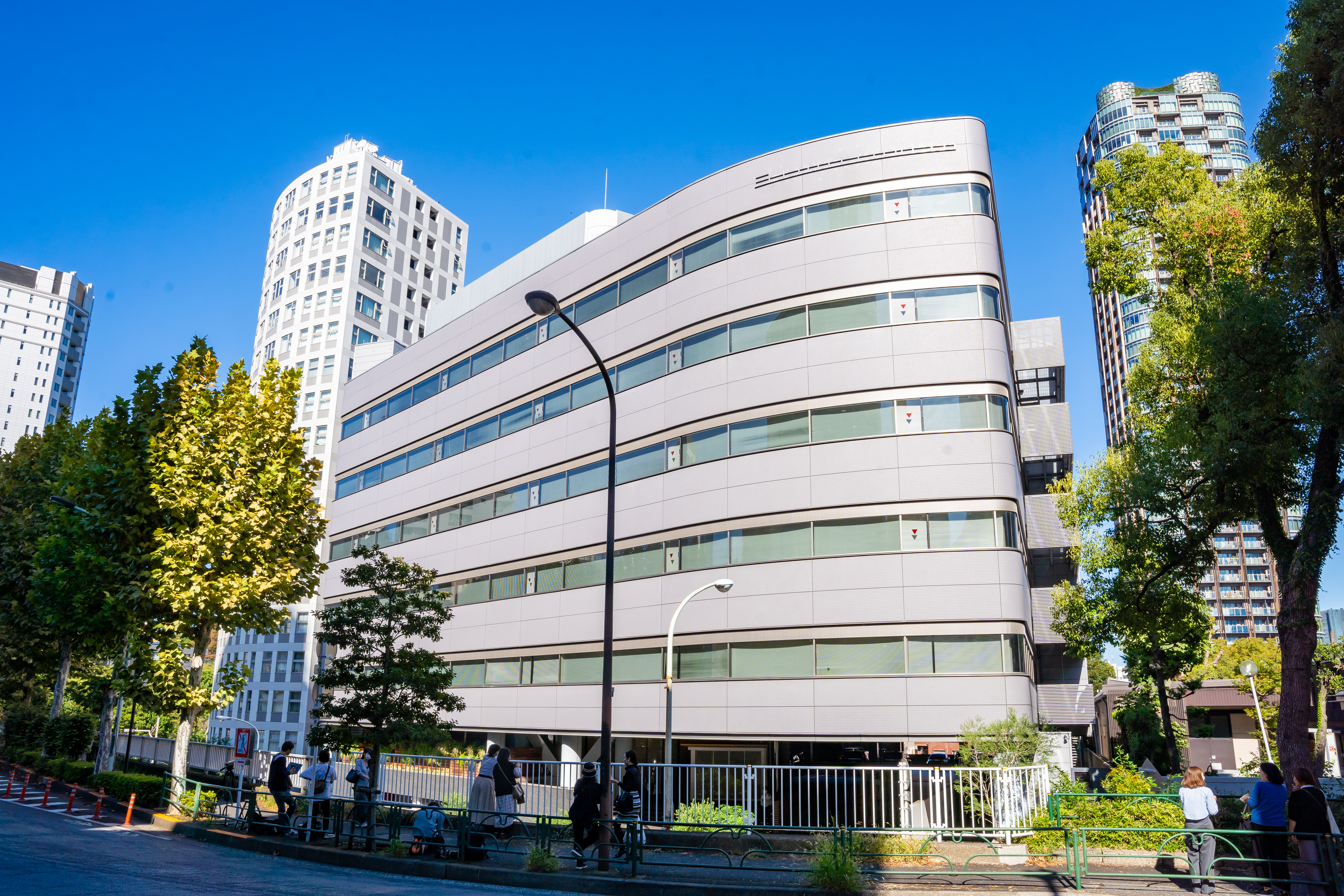
Johnny & Associates (pictured in 2023) is a talent company created by Johnny Kitagawa.

Japanese record producer Johnny Kitagawa, the founder of the talent company Johnny & Associates and an influential figure in the J-pop idol industry, remains highly regarded in Japan after his death in 2019 despite previous allegations of sexual abuse towards the acts managed by his company and was never criminally charged for them. In addition, Kitagawa's allegations went widely unreported in Japanese mainstream media. British journalist Mobeen Azhar travels to Japan to investigate why public opinion of him is still favourable.

Azhar first discusses the influence that Kitagawa and Johnny & Associates have on Japanese media. Entertainers from Johnny & Associates are prolific in television, film, music, and even advertisements. Young boys are accepted into the company as trainees known as Johnny's Jr., with Kitagawa's opinion ultimately determining whether they would debut. Azhar interviews Ryutaro Nakamura, the journalist who published Kitagawa's sexual abuse allegations in the magazine Shūkan Bunshun in 1999, as well as the attorney representing Shūkan Bunshun in their lawsuit with Johnny & Associates. Azhar states that Kitagawa would blacklist any media outlet that provided unfavourable coverage on himself, Johnny & Associates, or the company's entertainers. He calls Johnny & Associates to arrange an interview with Julie Keiko Fujishima, Kitagawa's niece and the current CEO of the agency, but they decline his request.

Azhar interviews four former Johnny's Jrs: an anonymous man known as "Hayashi", Junya Hiramoto, Ryu Takahashi, and Ren. The interviewees all stated that it was known and expected of them to put up with Kitagawa's advances if it meant they could debut. While only one interviewee recognises his experiences as assault, the others stated that despite Kitagawa's actions, they still see him favourably. Azhar also visits and interviews Nobuki Yamaguchi, a therapist focused on sexual trauma against male victims, where they discuss how grooming, Japan's "culture of shame", and previous laws against male-on-male sexual assault prevent male survivors from recognising their abuse.

Towards the end of his trip, Azhar attempts to interview Fujishima again by personally going to Johnny & Associates, but he is turned away and asked to stop filming. Azhar later contacts Fujishima again in writing, and she responds with a statement that the company was "working to establish highly transparent organisational structures." Azhar comments that law and media insiders had refused to comment, and that even in death, Kitagawa remains protected.

== Production ==
Predator: The Secret Scandal of J-Pop was written and reported by Mobeen Azhar, with Megumi Inman in charge of directing. Azhar started researching the topic in 2019 following Kitagawa's death. Throughout production of this documentary, Azhar and Inman stated that, with the exception of Shūkan Bunshun, Japanese media and industry professionals generally declined to talk to them, and they were advised multiple times not to create the documentary.

== Release ==
Predator: The Secret Scandal of J-Pop was first broadcast on 7 March 2023 on BBC Two as part of the documentary television series This World, as well on their website, to residents in the United Kingdom. It was broadcast in Australia on 10 April 2023 on ABC TV as part of the documentary television series Four Corners.

In Japan, the documentary was broadcast through BBC World News Japan on 18 and 19 March 2023. The Daily Beast reported Japanese television networks were reluctant to broadcast it, leading to the BBC to broadcast it themselves. The only Japanese streaming service to do so was Hulu Japan out of contractual obligations with the BBC, though its parent company, Nippon TV, was in a "panic" about the broadcast.

A follow-up programme, Our World: The Shadow of a Predator, aired in April 2024.

== Reception ==
The Guardian rated Predator: The Secret Scandal of J-Pop three stars out of five, praising the documentary but criticising Azhar's reactions to some of his interviews and his frustration in attempts to contact Julie Keiko Fujishima.

Azhar and Inman won the Freedom of the Press 2023 Award from the Foreign Correspondents' Club of Japan for their work on the film.

== Impact ==
For decades, Kitagawa's allegations went widely unreported in Japanese media; however, following the release of Predator: The Secret Scandal of J-Pop, the documentary prompted widespread international coverage, which later pressured Japanese media into acknowledging them. On 5 April 2023, Shūkan Bunshun published an article where former Johnny's Jr. member Kauan Okamoto stated that he had been sexually abused by Kitagawa between 2012 and 2016. Okamoto stated that he was encouraged to come forward with his experience after the documentary's release. Okamoto was invited to speak at the Foreign Correspondents' Club of Japan on 13 April 2023. On 14 May 2023, Julie Keiko Fujishima posted a written apology and a video apologizing for causing "disappointment and anxiety", but she also stated that Johnny & Associates could not confirm whether the allegations were true.

Following Okamoto's statement, several other victims revealed Kitagawa had also sexually abused them, leading to Johnny & Associates launching an independent investigation of the company. On 7 August 2023, the investigation found that Kitagawa had sexually abused hundreds of boys over the span of 50 years, and that his sister and former Johnny & Associates vice president, Mary Yasuko Fujishima, had covered for his behaviour. On 7 September 2023, Julie Keiko Fujishima stepped down as CEO of Johnny & Associates and acknowledged the abuse that took place. Several brands, including Asahi Group Holdings, Kirin Holdings Company, and Suntory Holdings Limited, announced they would not be renewing contracts with any entertainer associated with Johnny & Associates.

== See also ==
- Jimmy Savile sexual abuse scandal, which surrounded similarly large-scale sexual abuse revelations documented in a television documentary by BBC competitor ITV.
