= Johnny Kitagawa sexual abuse scandal =

2023 Japanese entertainment industry scandal

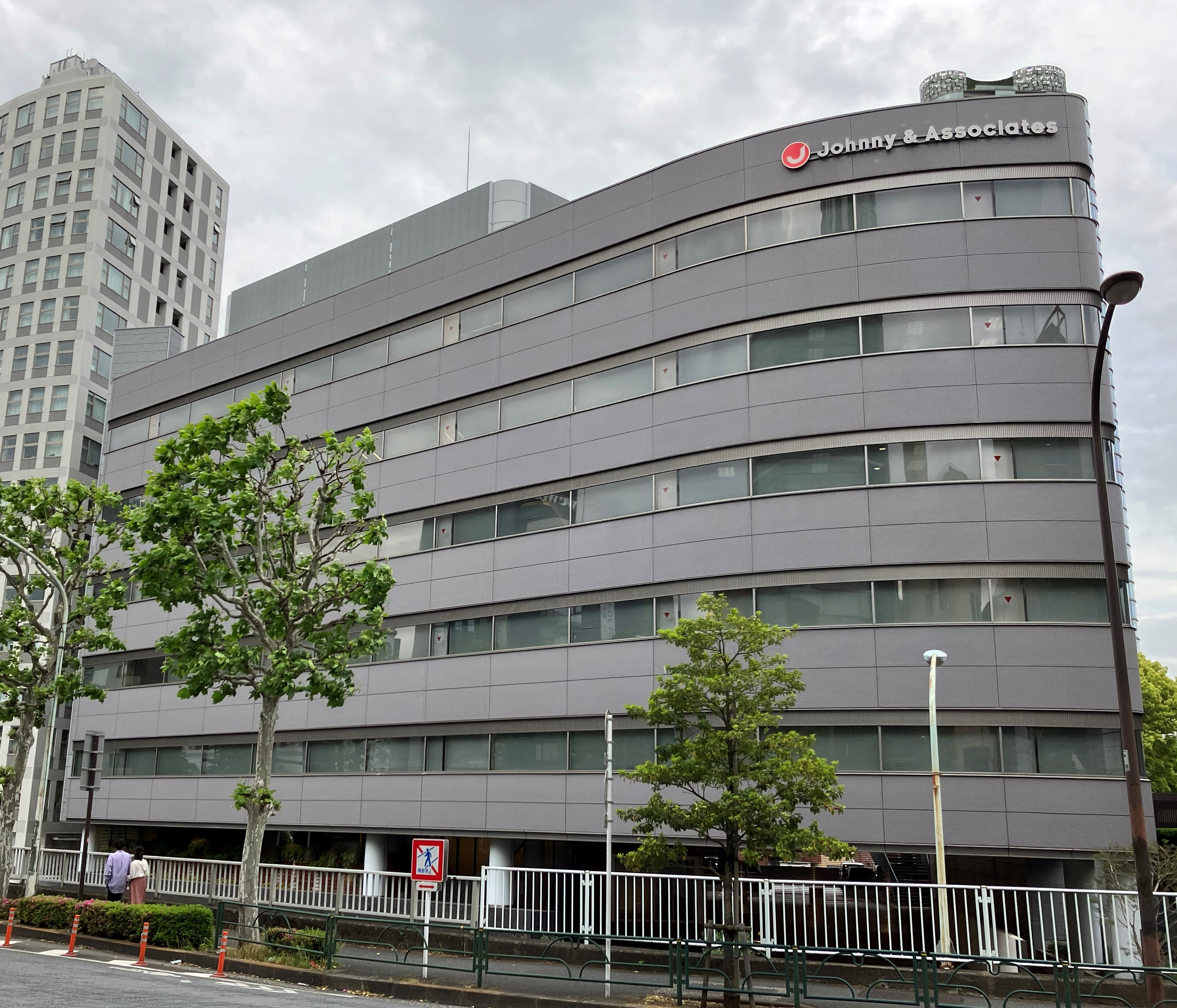
Headquarters of Johnny & Associates

In 2023, it was revealed that Johnny Kitagawa (1931–2019), the founder of the Japanese talent agency Johnny & Associates, had committed repeated acts of sexual abuse from the 1950s until the mid-2010s. Considered one of the most powerful figures in the Japanese entertainment industry, Kitagawa held a virtual monopoly on the creation of boy bands in Japan for more than forty years. No criminal charges were ever filed against Kitagawa during his lifetime, as the Japanese media had covered up the abuse without reporting it at all. The revelations drew comparisons in the media and among the public to the Jimmy Savile sexual abuse scandal 11 years prior, owed to similarities in the scale and nature of the abuse, its institutional coverup, and its posthumous exposure.

Between 1988 and 2000, Kitagawa was the subject of numerous allegations that he had taken advantage of his position to engage in improper sexual relationships with adolescent boys under contract to Johnny & Associates. Kitagawa denied these claims, and in 2002 was awarded an ¥8.8 million judgment against Shukan Bunshun, the magazine that had published some of the allegations. An appeal by the magazine followed, resulting in a partial reversal of the judgment. The Tokyo High Court reduced the damages to ¥1.2 million, concluding that reports of underage drinking and smoking facilitated by Kitagawa were defamatory, but that the allegations of sexual exploitation by Kitagawa were true. A 2004 appeal to the Supreme Court by Kitagawa was rejected. The case saw minimal coverage in Japan, with many journalists attributing it to Kitagawa's influence over the country's media.

In 2023, four years after his death, the allegations became more publicly known after a report in August of that year concluded that Kitagawa committed sexual abuse from the early 1970s until the mid-2010s, including the rape of hundreds of boys who were under contract to Johnny & Associates. The report came after abuse claims against Kitagawa had received renewed attention following the release of the documentary Predator: The Secret Scandal of J-Pop and further allegations made by musician and former Johnny's Jr. member Kauan Okamoto earlier in the year. A reported number of 478 persons have claimed to have been victimized by Kitagawa, of those, 325 sought compensation, and only 150 have been confirmed to have signed to Johnny & Associates. Later that year, it was revealed that the agency would be renamed to SMILE UP, and that anything bearing the name "Johnny", such as related companies and performing groups, would undergo changes to remove any trace of Kitagawa's name. A follow-up program by the BBC aired in 2024, called Our World: The Shadow of a Predator, continued with a further look at the case that got almost 1000 claims made.

== Allegations during Kitagawa's lifetime ==
=== Initial claims ===
In 1988, Koji Kita, a former member of Four Leaves, published a series of diaries under the title Hikaru Genji e (光Genjiへ, Dear Hikaru Genji). Kita wrote that Johnny Kitagawa had used his position of influence over the group to make unwanted sexual advances towards the boys under contract to him. In 1989, former Johnnys member Ryo Nakatani published similar allegations in his book Johnny's Revenge and stated that he was sexually abused by Kitagawa when he was 11 years old. Similar allegations were made in a book published in 1996 by Junya Hiramoto, a former member of Johnny's Jr. Hiramoto alleged Kitagawa shared the same dormitory as his talents and that he had seen him force a boy to have sex with him.

In 1999, the weekly magazine Shūkan Bunshun printed a ten-part series that detailed numerous allegations of sexual improprieties. The accusers were a dozen teenage boys who had been recruited into the Johnny & Associates organization, who spoke on condition of anonymity. In addition, the series accused Kitagawa of permitting minors in his employ to drink alcohol and smoke.

=== Lawsuit ===
Yoshihide Sakaue, a member of the House of Representatives, held a hearing on the matter in April 2000. Sakaue said that as a result of the media coverage, and in response to a request from a constituent, he wanted to examine whether government officials had properly investigated complaints about Kitagawa. Officials of the National Police Agency acknowledged that they had investigated Kitagawa's agency, but had not determined that sexual harassment had occurred. Officials indicated that Kitagawa's company was warned about permitting minors to use alcohol and smoke cigarettes.

The National Police and Welfare Ministry indicated that under the Ministry's understanding of the law, even if the allegations against Kitagawa were true, the acts could not be considered child abuse because Kitagawa was neither parent nor guardian to the boys in his employ. Officials testified that neither the boys nor their parents had pursued a criminal complaint against Kitagawa. Kitagawa denied any wrongdoing, and his attorney characterized the claims as being from disgruntled former employees voicing discontent. Kitagawa sued Shūkan Bunshun for libel.

After protracted litigation, in 2002 the Tokyo District Court awarded Kitagawa an ¥8.8 million judgment against Shūkan Bunshun, finding that the articles defamed him. Shūkan Bunshun appealed the ruling. In a partial reversal of the district court, the Tokyo High Court in 2003 ruled that the Shūkan Bunshun series did in fact defame Kitagawa. However, it ruled that the defamatory content of the articles was limited to the allegations that Kitagawa had provided minors with alcohol and tobacco products. The court found that the Shūkan Bunshun had sufficient reason to accept as trustworthy, and publish, the sexual allegations by Kitagawa's former clients. Kitagawa appealed this decision to the Supreme Court. In 2004, the court rejected his appeal.

Other than Shūkan Bunshun, none of the major Japanese media covered the story of the allegations against Kitagawa, the hearing in Parliament, or the Kitagawa lawsuit. The New York Times attributed this lack of coverage to Kitagawa's influence over the popular media. Once Shūkan Bunshun began publication of the series, Johnny & Associates denied the magazine and the other media owned by its parent organization, access to any of its performers. In 2023, The Asahi Shimbun speculated that the Japanese media also initially did not take the news seriously because men were not seen as sexual assault victims at the time and thus the news was seen as "gossip"; and because Shūkan Bunshun had lost the initial lawsuit. In addition, each media company had a dedicated person who would act as a "representative" of Johnny & Associates, where they would act as an in-between between both companies; those representatives were often fans of talents from Johnny & Associates.

== Subsequent allegations and 2023 scandal ==
Following the lawsuit, in 2005, Shogo Kiyama, a former Johnny's Jr. member, published a book criticizing how broadcasters never reported Kitagawa's case and he was never punished in spite of the allegations. Kiyoshi Matsuo, a Japanese record producer, who had mentioned Kitagawa's sexual harassment allegations in various media, had his management contract terminated in the middle of the period by Smile Company, to which he had belonged. He stated that Mariya Takeuchi and her husband Tatsuro Yamashita, who also belong to the company, agreed with the company's policy.

Shortly after Kitagawa's death in July 2019, Shūkan Bunshun posted another sexual assault allegation from a former Johnny's Jr. member, who alleged that his first kiss was with Kitagawa, and that because he resisted his advances, he was relegated to the corner of the stage during performances. In January 2021, Koki Maeda, a former member of 7 Men Samurai, stated through an interview with Arama! Japan that he was "certain" there were sexual relations between Kitagawa and Johnny's Jr. because he "had the privilege of deciding who deserved to debut". Moments after the interview was published, Maeda recanted his statement.

In March 2023, the BBC released a documentary centered on the sexual abuse claims against Kitagawa, Predator: The Secret Scandal of J-Pop, presented by Mobeen Azhar, who investigated why public opinion of him was still favourable at the time. Azhar started researching the topic in 2019 following Kitagawa's death. Throughout production of this documentary, Azhar and Inman stated that, with the exception of Shūkan Bunshun, Japanese media and industry professionals generally declined to talk to them, and they were advised multiple times not to create the documentary. In response to the documentary, Johnny & Associates stated that they were creating "transparent organizational structures" that would be announced later in the year.

In April 2023, musician and former Johnny's Jr. member Kauan Okamoto told a press conference held at the Foreign Correspondents' Club of Japan that he had been subjected to sexual abuse by Kitagawa on a number of occasions between 2012 and 2016, and called on the management to acknowledge the misconduct. Okamoto estimated that between 100 and 200 boys were invited to Kitagawa's home during his time at Johnny's, and claimed that when Kitagawa told one of his guests to go to bed early, everyone knew "it was your turn". In response to Okamoto's press conference, Johnny & Associates released a statement saying that it would "continue its unified effort to thoroughly ensure compliance without exception, and tackle strengthening of a system of governance," but the company did not directly address the allegations at the time. Later that month, NHK reported that Johnny & Associates was interviewing their employees and talents, and had sent a document out to business partners saying that they were looking into the allegations. The document said that the company took the allegations seriously and that their investigations so far had uncovered no cases of misconduct, adding that they were aware that such in-house interviews were not enough to uncover the truth. After the press conference, NHK reported on the abuse on April 13. This was the first television report on the scandal by NHK. It was broadcast for two minutes at 4 pm.

On May 14, 2023, Julie Keiko Fujishima, Kitagawa's niece and president of Johnny & Associates, issued an apology to those who had alleged sexual abuse by Kitagawa. She added that she was committed to implementing measures addressing the victims' needs. Two days after Johnny & Associates released their statement, Okamoto and the former Johnny's Jr. Yasushi Hashida attended a parliamentary meeting at the National Diet organized by the Constitutional Democratic Party. Hashida said that he was sexually abused around twice by Kitagawa when he was 13 years old. Both Hashida and Okamoto credited coverage of the sexual abuse allegations by the foreign press as being key to paving the way for its coverage in the domestic press.

In July 2023, the United Nations Human Rights Council investigated Kitagawa's abuse at the agency. An independent probe established by Johnny & Associates reported the findings of their investigation on August 29, 2023, saying that Kitagawa repeatedly committed sexual abuse from the early 1970s until the mid-2010s. They recommended that Fujishima resign from her post as company president, and that the company must accept the claims of abuse and make amends for them. On September 7, 2023, Johnny & Associates held their first official press conference, where they formally acknowledged Kitagawa's abuse for the first time. Fujishima resigned, and former Shonentai's member Noriyuki Higashiyama took over as CEO. However, Higashiyama is also alleged to have told a Johnny's Jr. member to "eat my sausage" in the past.

Ryoichi Hattori's son Yoshitsugu and his friend Motoyasu Matsuzaki said that Kitagawa sexually abused them as children in the 1950s.

In December 2024, two former members of the talent agency, Kyohei Iida and Junya Tanaka, filed a lawsuit in Nevada claiming $300 million in damages for alleged abuse perpetrated by Kitagawa in Las Vegas.

=== Aftermath ===
On 6 September 2023, Guinness World Records decided to remove Kitagawa's achievement of producing the most top songs on the pop music chart from its official website. However, they did not eliminate his record titles, as he was never convicted. This decision was accepted as a wise decision by the newly appointed president of Johnny & Associates, Higashiyama. Companies such as Suntory and McDonald's which had previously contracted with Johnny & Associates for advertising or promotional campaigns decided to either retract or not renew their contracts with Johnny's artists as a response to the Kitagawa scandal. Suntory demanded plans of prevention and reparations for the victims as prerequisites of reestablishing partnership.

Several major news outlets, including NHK, Nippon TV, TV Asahi, TBS, TV Tokyo and Fuji Television, issued statements in recognition of their years of silence that effectively allowed Kitagawa's sexual abuses to continue unabated. Bungeishunjū and Mobeen Azhar were awarded in 2023 by the Foreign Correspondents' Club of Japan (FCCJ) for their coverage of the scandal. The FCCJ likened this scandal to the assassination of Shinzo Abe, citing media silence on the systemic abuses by organizations close to powerful figures.

==== Company renaming ====
Several Japanese news outlets reported on October 1, 2023, that Johnny & Associates was considering creating a new company to manage its performers, while the current Johnny & Associates would change its name and continue to exist for the purpose of compensating abuse victims. It was also reported that Noriyuki Higashiyama, who became the head of Johnny & Associates after the resignation of Julie K. Fujishima, was also expected to head the new company. On October 2, Johnny & Associates held a press conference to outline their plans, announcing that they would be renaming the current company to SMILE UP–taking a name that they had used in their 2020 charity project–effective October 17. SMILE UP will continue to exist under the ownership of Fujishima and will eventually close down once all sexual abuse compensation requests, which numbered 325 at the time of the announcement, have been processed.

Higashiyama told reporters that performers working under the new, yet-to-be-named management company "will have the freedom to pursue their own career paths without being restricted or entirely dependent on the company." It was also announced that anything bearing the name "Johnny", such as related companies and company sections like Johnny's Island and J-Storm and performing groups such as Johnny's West and Kanjani Eight, would undergo changes to remove any trace of the Johnny's name. Higashiyama said that "all things with the Johnny's name will have to go," while Fujishima, who did not attend the October 2 press conference, said that she wanted to "erase all that remains of Johnny from this world." While initially Higashiyama was supposed to take the reins of the new company, on a conference given on 30 October, Higashiyama cancelled his appointment, and Atsushi Fukuda, president of Speedy, a consulting company, stepped up as the new president.

It was revealed on December 8, 2023, that the new artist management company would be called Starto Entertainment, a name fusing the word "star" and the hiragana と (to), with the meaning for the latter to be "toward the future". The name of the new company was decided after reviewing 140,156 fan applications. As said previously, Higashiyama was to replace Fujishima in both the new artist management company, as well as in the presidency of the original, but Higashiyama declined the role in the new one. Fukuda was appointed as president of Starto.

=== 2024: Follow up documentary ===
A follow-up program by the BBC aired in 2024, called "Our World: The Shadow of a Predator", continued with a further look at the case. The program included exclusive interviews with Smile-Up's new president, Higashiyama, Akimasa Nihongi, a former agency talent, and the widow of one of the victims. In the program. Higashiyama admits that he has no formal training or experience in counselling or helping survivors, and yet, he expects that, after talking to close to 200 victims personally, “... it will help mend their hearts, even just a little." About the alleged existence of more perpetrators, Higashiyama confirmed hearing about two, but, as he mentioned, he did not report the fact to the police. According to him, that corresponds to the victims, for them to file a criminal complaint, with the agency cooperating as much as possible. Nihongi went public with his allegations, after seeing the story reported in 2023. He believes that there is still some secrecy involving the issue. "I want them to take responsibility. I think this is the biggest post-war sexual assault case in Japan. We shouldn't let it fade away as if it's a temporary problem. It's important to keep a record as part of Japanese history." According to the other interviewee, her husband suffered from online harassment and death threats after revealing the abuse. She received a message from her husband, telling her that he would retire to the mountains; his corpse was later discovered by a search party. One of the consequences of the case is that Prime Minister Fumio Kishida faced increasing pressure to reform sexual abuse legislation, shifting the age of consent in Japan from 13 to 16, after multiple rape acquittals in 2019 and the increase of men reporting sexual abuse.

On April 25, 2024, Smile Up posted on its site a letter sent to the BBC, in which they protested about the edition of Higashiyama's words in the program and a long edition of the interview, saying that "what was broadcast was different from the actual purpose of Higashiyama's remarks", promoting slander instead of preventing it. They also pointed, in said post, to the lack of professionalism when dealing with the interviews with the victims. Smile Up demanded in the letter a correction and apology. On May 3, 2024, the BBC responded to Smile Up's demand, via Twitter with a written statement, saying: "This documentary was rigorously researched and reported in line with the BBC's strict editorial guidelines... We ensured that all contributors, including Mr. Higashiyama, were represented fairly and accurately and included all necessary rights of reply." The statement adds, "The BBC did not agree to any restrictions in what could be discussed during the meeting set up by Smile Up. with survivors and rejects this assertion."

=== New lawsuits ===
==== United States lawsuit ====
In December 2024 two former Johnny & Associates talent filed a lawsuit in the United States against Smile-Up and Starto Entertainment seeking US$300 million in damages, in what was reported to be the first litigation by Kitagawa's victims. The lawsuit filed in Clark County, Nevada by plaintiffs Junya Tanaka and Kyōhei Iida alleged that Kitagawa sexually abused them in a Las Vegas hotel when they were teenagers in March 1997 and August 2002, respectively. The lawsuit also alleged that Julie Keiko Fujishima (Kitagawa's niece) and other former company executives were aware of the abuse, but failed to take appropriate action. Iida said in a statement that a "fundamental shift in societal awareness" was crucial to ensure such incidents are never repeated, while Tanaka said he wished to make people aware that speaking out against this kind of abuse was suppressed in Japan for decades. Smile-Up said in response to the lawsuit that they would consult with lawyers in the United States, adding their belief that a U.S. court should not have jurisdiction over the matter because the plaintiffs lived in Japan at the time. Starto Entertainment claimed that their company was not related to the case, and there was no reason for them to be sued. An American lawyer representing Tanaka and Iida told NHK that the case is not subject to any statute of limitations in the state of Nevada.

==== Smile-Up's counterlawsuit ====
In February 2025, Smile-Up filed their own lawsuit against Iida and Tanaka, and two other claimants. Smile-Up's lawsuit said the three victims' refusal to accept the framework should absolve the company of paying compensation to them. For the other victim, the company is seeking confirmation that it has no obligation to pay more than the amount of compensation offered by the relief committee. Tanaka and Iida held a press conference on February 6. At the news conference, Tanaka emphasized that Smile-Up's lawsuit was filed shortly after it became clear that the company had been sued in the United States. Yuko Atsumi, a lawyer representing the victims, said Smile-Up is unilaterally imposing its own framework on the victims. She also said the lawsuit could be a means of preventing victims from taking legal action in the United States. A representative of Smile-Up told The Asahi Shimbun that the company intends to proceed with compensation payments in accordance with decisions of the victims relief committee. In November 2024, the company sued Shimon Ishimaru, 57, former deputy chief of the Johnny's Sexual Assault Victims Association, dissolved in September 2024. The company is seeking confirmation that it does not have to pay more than 18 million yen in damages to Ishimaru, the figure proposed by the victims relief committee.

==== NHK's documentary, and the lawsuit against man claiming assault in NHK building ====
On October 20, 2024, the special documentary "NHK Special: Johnny Kitagawa The reality of the "idol empire"" aired on NHK. The sister of Ryo Nakatani, one of the first group of claimants, a former "Johnnys" member who died in 2021, asked on the show for the agency to extend an apology, and for Noriyuki Higashiyama, as the representative, to do it. On the 25, Smile-Up posted on its site that Higashiyama, indeed, had visited the family in September, and had apologized in the name of the agency.

On October 31, 2024, Bunshun reported the case of a man that had appeared on NHK's "News 7" broadcast on October 9, 2023. According to the report, the man had claimed that Kitagawa had assaulted him a total of five times in a private room inside the men's restroom in the NHK Broadcasting Center, after he had auditioned to appear in NHK's "Shonen Club". He met twice with the compensation officer and corporate lawyer of Smile-Up, but the man, named as "Mr. X", was unable to explain the location of the toilet, its layout, and the procedure for entering the Broadcasting Center. There were also questions about how he applied for the audition." Smile-Up decided to file a lawsuit against him. On February 10, 2025, the result of the lawsuit filed in Chiba on October 11, 2024, was revealed. Smile-Up had refused to provide compensation, arguing that Kitagawa was not in Japan at the time the man claimed to have been assaulted, and that they had filed a lawsuit seeking confirmation that the company had no obligation to compensate the man, stating that the truth of the testimony needed to be made clear. At the first oral argument held at the Chiba District Court on the 10, the man's lawyer commented, "There is no change to the man's statement that he was sexually assaulted, but since the statute of limitations has already expired, we do not dispute that SMILE-UP. is not obligated to pay damages". The trial concluded.

==== March 2025 report ====
On March 14, 2025, Smile-Up posted on their site an update regarding the lawsuits in which they are involved. As of this day, 557 cases have been attended to, paid compensation to 545 people (around the 99% of the total), 9 people have been dealt with by civil court or civil mediation.

In the case of the company being the plaintiff, the company filed suits against a total of 6 people of which (1) 2 have been confirmed to have their enrollment record and confirmed the accuracy of the damage report, but do not agree with the amount offered by the Victim Relief Committee, (2) 3 have been confirmed to have their enrollment record and are seeking compensation but did not respond to the request to use the compensation framework by the Victim Relief Committee, and (3) one person who did not confirm the accuracy of the contents of the damage report (the case was dismissed).

In the case of the company being defendants, a total of 3 people filed civil lawsuits against the company. They notified these people that they would not be providing compensation because they are unable to confirm their employment history or the veracity of their damage reports. "For those whose damage reports cannot be confirmed, including these three individuals, we believe it is necessary to prevent false reports in order to ensure the fairness of the compensation framework in the future. Therefore, we will not necessarily provide detailed information on the reasons for our decision. However, when we receive inquiries, we have explained the reasons to the extent possible, and if new evidence or testimony is submitted, we will reconsider the matter based on the content of the evidence. We will wait for the complaint to be served on us regarding the lawsuit filed by these three individuals, and will respond sincerely to the court proceedings. In addition to these three individuals, we have received reports that two individuals, one in (1) and one in (2), out of the six individuals against whom we filed a civil lawsuit as described above, have filed lawsuits against us in the United States. However, we believe that the jurisdiction of the United States is not recognized."

=== 2025: Continued actions ===
In September 2025, former Johnny's Jr. members Junya Tanaka and Kazuya Nakamura spoke at the UN “Responsible Business and Human Rights Forum”, pointing to limit in statutes of limitations on sexual crimes as one of the problems in the resolution of cases. Nakamura and Akimasa Nihongi, together with other victims, had established in 2023 "1 is 2 many Action Plan to Eradicate Sexual Violence Against Children", also known as "Wani Action", which involves actions such as "legal experts for human rights issues and activities to abolish the statute of limitations," "clinical psychologists for sexual victim care," and "mental health workers for support for perpetrators with problems such as pedophilia".

== See also ==
- Sex trafficking in Japan
