= FCCJ =

FCCJ may refer to:

- Florida Community College at Jacksonville
- Foreign Correspondents' Club of Japan
