= Koyasan Buddhist Temple =

Buddhist temple in Los Angeles, California, United States

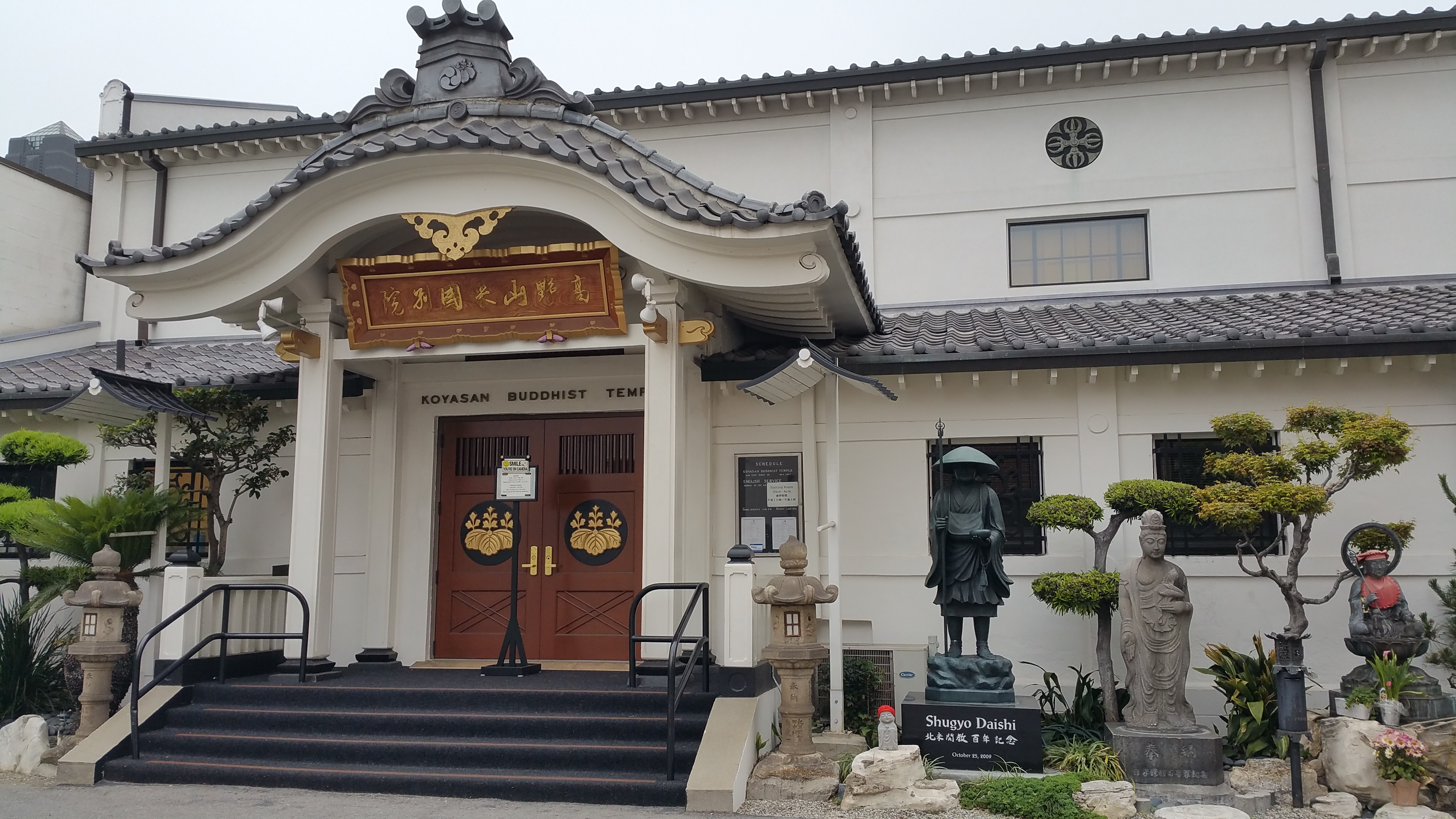
- Koyasan Temple in 2016

- Location in Los Angeles

Religion
- Affiliation: Buddhism
- Rite: Shingon

Location
- Location: 342 East 1st Street, Los Angeles, California 90012
- Country: United States
- Interactive map of Koyasan Buddhist Temple
- Coordinates: 34°02′57″N 118°14′25″W

Architecture
- Founder: Shutai Aoyama
- Completed: 1912

Website
- Official Website; Official Facebook Page

Koyasan Beikoku Betsuin (高野山米国別院, Kōyasan Beikoku Betsuin; "Koyasan United States Branch Temple"), also known as Koyasan Buddhist Temple, is a Japanese Buddhist temple in the Little Tokyo district of Downtown Los Angeles, California, United States. Founded in 1912, it is one of the oldest existing Buddhist temples in the North American mainland region. The temple is a branch of Koyasan Shingon Buddhism and is the North America regional headquarters for the school.

== History ==
In 1909, the Reverend Shutai Aoyama, native and former chief priest of Kakuganji Temple in Toyama- ken, left Japan for the United States with the blessings of Archbishop Misumon Yuhan and his other superiors, “to observe the religious situation in North America, as well as propagate Shingon Buddhism." In 1912, with support and encouragement from some of the Los Angeles Japanese community’s leading citizens, Issei and Nisei temple members a like, he opened the first Shingon temple in the United States in a store front in Little Tokyo called Koyasan Daishi Kyōkai of Los Angeles or just Daishi Church. The Koyasan Shingon sect of Buddhism focuses on Shingon teachings compiled by Kobo Daishi (Kukai) in the Heian period.

In 1935, the Temple was elevated to the status of Koyasan Beikoku Betsuin, meaning it became the North American regional headquarters, recognized by the Koyasan Headquarters of Japan. In 1940, the Temple moved to its current location on East 1st Street, but the bombing of Pearl Harbor would forever changed the Japanese American community across the nation. Anti-Japanese sentiment ran rampant. Within a year, the temple in Los Angeles was closed, its hall and basement piled to the ceiling with members’ possessions, and its membership, both U.S. citizens and non-citizens alike, were relocated to internment camps during World War II.

Over the years, the temple began opening cultural and religious programs and classes for the local community. Prior to redevelopment in Little Tokyo in the 1980s, Koyasan served as the main hub of Japanese cultural events. In 1987, the temple hosted the Kechien Kanjo ritual, a service rarely conducted outside Japan. Two years later, the temple was designated the keeper of the Hiroshima Peace Flame, brought over from Japan by Los Angeles Mayor Tom Bradley. Starting in 1999, the temple underwent a ten-year renovation of the old facilities to meet with the city building codes; the building was especially retrofitted to fit the needs for the monthly Goma fire ritual service. In 2012, the temple celebrated its centennial anniversary, hosting a special goma fire ritual service presided over by Bishop Ekan Ikeguchi from Kagoshima. The temple celebrated its 110th anniversary in 2022 by hosting a special precept ceremony for members.

== Building ==
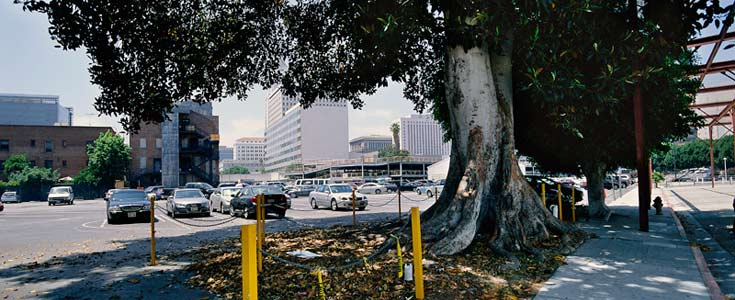
The Aoyama Tree is a 60 by 70 foot (18 by 21 m) Moreton Bay fig Tree (Ficus macrophylla) located in the city of Los Angeles-owned parking lot next to the National Center for the Preservation of Democracy, a component of the Japanese American National Museum. The tree marks the former location of the Koyasan Daishi Church.

The first established site was a storefront in 1912 near Elysian Park. In 1920, the temple was moved to a larger building on Central Avenue. A tree was planted in front of the new building by Koyasan Temple members to commemorate the move. The Aoyama Tree is a 60 by 70 feet (18 by 21 m) Moreton Bay fig tree (Ficus macrophylla) and notable landmark in Little Tokyo was given historical status by the Los Angeles City Council in 2008. After the former temple building was demolished, the tree was left without an irrigation system with the area immediately surrounding the tree was paved over, covering the tree's extensive roots system, denying the tree essential water.

The current building consists of a main hall, which measures 60 by 120 feet (18 by 37 m), and an annex that measures 40 by 50 feet (12 by 15 m). The main hall has a seating capacity of 600 people, and a grand scale altar where the traditional esoteric rituals are performed. The main Buddha in the main hall is Dainichi Nyorai of the Vajradhatu Mandala. There are several other esoteric deities enshrined in the main hall of the temple (Fudo Myoo, Yakushi Nyorai, Jizo, Kannon, and Kobo Daishi).

The second floor of the annex is a shrine to Kobo Daishi, designed for the purpose of religious gatherings and study classes especially for small groups, and accommodates a seating capacity of 100 people. It is known as the “Daishi-Do”, or the "Hall of Daishi".

The temple basement, located under the main altar, is used as an assembly room for scouting activities. In addition, an office, meeting room, reception room, kitchen, and several classrooms are provided for the purposes of the institution's operations.

== Bishops ==
The temple has had eight head bishops since its establishment in 1912. The fourth and fifth bishop, Reverends Seytsu Takahashi and Ryosho Sogabe, are credited with the building of the current building structure. Takahashi was recognized for his personal contributions and strong faith in campaigning for building a new temple; Takahashi served a one-year term in 1982 as the 482nd Hōin-daikajō-i for Kongobuji Temple at Mt. Koya, dying shortly afterward in 1983. Reverend Taido Kitagawa was a co-organizer of the temple's Boy Scout Troop 379, one of the oldest Boy Scout troops in the United States, and the father of Johnny Kitagawa, known for founding the talent agency Johnny & Associates and for sexually abusing boys in the Johnny Kitagawa sexual abuse scandal. Reverend Taisen Miyata, the seventh bishop and translator of Esoteric Buddhist texts, served from 1993 to 2007 and was acting bishop from 2011 to 2013.

- Rev. Shutai Aoyama (1909-1921)
- Rev. Hokai Takada (1921-1924)
- Rev. Taido Kitagawa (1924-1933)
- Rev. Seytsu Takahashi (1931-1982)
- Rev. Ryosho Sogabe (1982-1991)
- Rev. Chiko Inouye (1991-1993)
- Rev. Taisen Miyata (1993-2007)
- Rev. Seicho Asahi (2007-2011)
- Rev. Taisen Miyata (acting: 2011–2013)
- Rev. Junkun Imamura (2015–2019)
- Rev. Yuju Matsumoto (2020–2026)

== Boy Scout Troop 379 ==
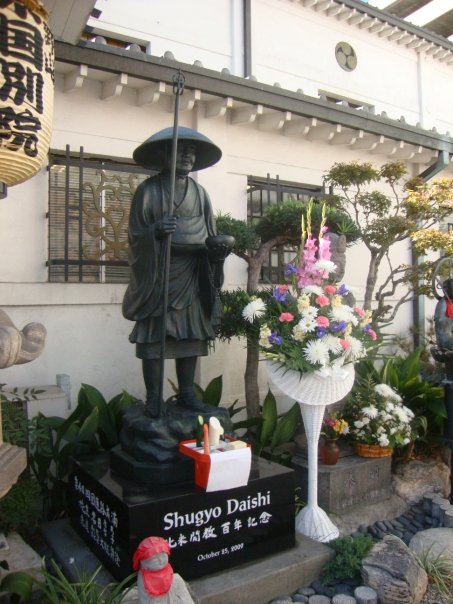
Statue of Kōbō Daishi (Kūkai)

The temple also hosts Boy Scout Troop 379, formed in 1931, one of the oldest troops in existence in California. Future actor and gay rights activist George Takei was one of the troop's members.

== See also ==
- Japanese American National Museum
