= Mobeen Azhar =

British journalist

- Presenting career
- Network: BBC
- Country: United Kingdom

Mobeen Azhar is a British journalist, radio and television presenter, and filmmaker of Pakistani heritage. He produces investigative reports and films for the BBC exploring themes related to politics, true crime, extremism, counter terrorism and sexuality. He has presented and produced international documentaries for BBC One, BBC Two and BBC Three.

Azhar has fronted radio programmes on the BBC Asian Network BBC Radio 4 and BBC Radio 5 Live. Since 2022, he has presented the Outlook strand on the BBC World Service. He also presents the Lives Less Ordinary podcast made by the BBC World Service and available on BBC Sounds, Spotify and Apple.

In 2017, he won a British Academy Television Award for producing the BBC series Muslims Like Us and in 2020, he won a Royal Television Society Award for presenting BBC documentary Hometown: A Killing. In 2019, Azhar became a presenter on the new BBC Three show Plastic Surgery Undressed.

In 2019, Azhar became a founding partner in the independent production company Forest. In 2023, Azhar presented the documentary Predator: The Secret Scandal of J-Pop, centered on the sexual abuse claims against Johnny Kitagawa, which helped posthumously expose his crimes.

== Early life and education ==
Azhar was born and raised in Huddersfield in Yorkshire. His parents had emigrated from Pakistan. His father was a bus driver and a shopkeeper who encouraged Azhar to go to university.

At university, Azhar gained a law degree and master's degree in theology. He returned to study broadcast journalism at Leeds Trinity University after working for a charity.

== Career ==
In 2012, Azhar was part of a team reporting from Waziristan in Pakistan on US drone strikes on the Afghan border for a BBC Panorama special, The Secret Drone War.

In August 2013, he investigated gay life in urban Pakistan for Assignment: Inside Gay Pakistan on the BBC World Service and on BBC Radio 4.

Azhar has written about and reported extensively on musician Prince. In 2015, he presented BBC documentary Hunting for Prince's Vault, and in September 2016, Azhar's debut book Prince Stories from the Purple Underground: 1958–2016 was published by Welbeck Publishing.

In 2016, Azhar joined a police team of "Taliban Hunters" in Karachi, Pakistan, as part of documentary reporting for BBC's Panorama. During filming he was shot at by the Taliban.

In February 2016, Azhar presented the BBC Three documentary Webcam Boys, spending a couple of months with men who make money from performing in online sex shows.

In 2019, Azhar presented BBC documentaries The Satanic Verses: 30 Years On, A Black and White Killing: The Case that Shook America and The Best Pakistani Transgender Retirement Home.

The same year, Azhar also presented six-part BBC documentary series, Hometown: A Killing, reporting on the police shooting of Yassar Yaqub in Huddersfield in 2017. Yasser Yaqub's father, Mohammed Yaqub, who featured in the series, claimed Azhar had attempted to "smear" his son's name. Huddersfield MP Barry Sheerman also criticised the programme, claiming it depicted the town as "a hotbed of violent crime". The docu-series went on to win several awards.

During the same year, Azhar became a presenter on the BBC Three show Plastic Surgery Undressed, alongside Vogue Williams.

In 2020, two additional episodes of Hometown: A Killing were released on BBC Three and BBC One. An accompanying six-part podcast was released on BBC Sounds.

In May 2021, Azhar presented a BBC Two documentary The Battle For Britney: Fans, Cash, And A Conservatorship, reporting from California and Louisiana on the #FreeBritney movement who claim music star Britney Spears is being "kept a virtual prisoner in her own home" through a conservatorship managed by her father. Spears was reported to have criticized the documentary, describing it as "hypocritical".

In July 2021, Azhar presented Secrets of an ISIS Smartphone on BBC Three and BBC One. Filmed in the UK, the documentary used footage from the smartphones of British men who had travelled to Syria to join ISIS. The Financial Times said the film provided "an unexpected insight".

In August 2022, Azhar presented a five-part BBC series Scam City: Money, Mayhem and Maseratis, investigating the world of Instagram scams, forex trading and pyramid schemes.

In November 2022, Azhar presented a six-part true-crime series Santa Claus the Serial Killer on the relaunched BBC Three channel, exploring the case of serial killer Bruce McArthur. The series was filmed in Canada and explores themes of race, faith, culture and sexuality. The Guardian criticised the series: "At times there is a sense that this is less an investigation and more a whistlestop tour of the Bruce McArthur murder tourism industry. These people have told their stories countless times now, and there is something truly unedifying about Azhar's (and the audience's) willingness to rubberneck at so much well-worn trauma."

Azhar was appointed a member of the advisory board for the 2022 Edinburgh International Television Festival, led by Afua Hirsch, appointed Advisory Chair in March 2022.

In March 2023, Azhar presented Predator: The Secret Scandal of J-Pop, a documentary exploring allegations of sexual abuse against Japanese pop mogul Johnny Kitagawa. Filmed in Tokyo, the programme was broadcast on BBC Two. The Guardian praised the documentary, calling it "a breathtaking look at Japan's paedophile boyband 'god'." The documentary went on to be broadcast on ABC in Australia, BBC Select in North America and BBC News Japan. Following the broadcast, Japanese Prime Minister Fumio Kishida announced a ministerial meeting to address the subject of child sexual abuse. In Summer 2023 a major overhaul of sexual crimes legislation was enacted in Japan. The age of consent was increased from 13 to 16; a new legal definition of rape was also introduced. In August 2023, the United Nations set up a task force to report on exploitation in the workplace within entertainment, concluding that Kitagawa had acted "with impunity" and recommended that survivors of abuse receive compensation. An external investigation recommended that Johnny & Associates CEO Julie Fujishima, who is Kitagawa's niece, stand down. In September 2023, Azhar received the Freedom of the Press Award from the Foreign Correspondence Club of Japan in acknowledgement of his work and the widespread impact of the documentary.

In February 2023, the BBC announced Azhar would front a new documentary and podcast about Kanye West "unfolding against the backdrop of Ye’s 2024 election campaign, and at a time when his behaviour has sparked outrage and a re-evaluation of his place in popular culture". Provisionally titled We Need to Talk about Kanye, the documentary was broadcast on BBC Two and ran alongside an accompanying eight-part podcast series on BBC Music, called The Kanye Story on BBC Sounds. The film was acquired by Binge in Australia, CBC in Canada and multiple broadcasters in Europe. The Guardian called the film a "hugely impressive documentary" that "holds the far right figurehead to account." The Jewish Chronicle review referred to Azhar as "intelligent, disarming and likeable" and concluded the documentary made for "distressing viewing." The Independent concluded "though focused on West, the documentary ends up as the latest grim snapshot of a nation rapidly sliding into chaos and far-right lunacy".

October 27th 2025 Azhar presented Behind Bars: Sex, Bribes and Murder. A 2- Part documentary about England's prisons for the BBC. This investigation was fuelled by a viral video featuring a female prison officer and an inmate having sex inside HMP Wandsworth.

== Awards ==
In May 2017, Azhar won a British Academy Television Award for his work as a producer on the BBC series Muslims Like Us.

In 2018, Azhar's show on the BBC Asian Network won Best Radio Show at the Asian Media Awards.

In June 2019, Azhar won the first Sandford St Martin Journalism Award for his BBC radio programme The Dawn of British Jihad.

In 2020, Azhar won the Royal Television Society 'Presenter of the Year' award for Hometown: A Killing. In the same year, he also won 'Best Presenter' at the Grierson Awards for the same documentary series.

Azhar has won an Amnesty International award for Panorama: The Secret Drone War.

He has also been nominated for a Foreign Press Association Award for his BBC Radio 4 programme Fatwa, and for his documentary Inside Gay Pakistan.

In August 2022, Azhar received an honorary fellowship at Leeds Trinity University, where he studied journalism for the first time in 18 years.

In September 2023, Azhar received the Freedom of Press Award from The Foreign Correspondence Club of Japan for his documentary Predator: The Secret Scandal of J-Pop.

== Personal life ==
Azhar is openly gay, and a Muslim. He is an avid fan of musician Prince and horror films.
