= Killing of Yassar Yaqub =

2017 death in Huddersfield, England

The killing of Yassar Yaqub occurred on the evening of 2 January 2017 near Huddersfield, West Yorkshire, England. Yaqub was a passenger in a car stopped by police on a sliproad near junction 24 of the M62 motorway and was fatally shot by a West Yorkshire Police firearms officer.

== Incident ==
Yaqub was in one of two cars travelling in a convoy when four unmarked police vehicles stopped them at junction 24 of the motorway in Huddersfield. While Amin obeyed police instructions, Yaqub had crouched down and as he brought his hands back up the officer was "under no doubt he was holding a handgun." The Judge said, "you knew that Yassar Yakub had a gun, which you both intended should be used in a way that endangered life in a preconceived and imminent way," to Amin at the sentencing.

The Crown Prosecution Service said there was evidence of "an ongoing drug feud".

== Investigation & Trial ==
During the 2018 trial at Leeds Crown Court the driver of the car, Mohsin Amin, was found guilty of conspiracy to possess a firearm with intent to endanger life. He was sentenced to 18 years in prison. The two other males, David Butlin and Rexhino Arapaj were cleared of firearms charges but Butlin was found guilty of possessing an offensive weapon, a push dagger.

Mohammed Yaqub, Yaqub's father, paid for additional private postmortem and ballistics tests and insisted that his son was doing "nothing wrong" at the time of the shooting.

== Aftermath ==
Journalist Mobeen Azhar created a BBC documentary series and a BBC Sounds podcast about the case, both called "Hometown: A Killing". They aired from 2019–2020.

In November 2022, following an inquest, the jury came to the conclusion of a lawful killing by the West Yorkshire Police firearms officer.

From the evidence produced and reviewed V39* honestly believed that a firearm was being aimed at him. His life was in danger, and he used reasonable force discharging his firearm.
