= Burton Crane =

Burton Crane (January 23, 1901 – February 3, 1963) was a New York Times correspondent on economics during the Occupation Period of Japan who also gained popularity as a singer in the same country, and was referred to as Japan's Bing Crosby.

He was a financial writer for The New York Times from 1937–1963. Aside from finance and writing as a foreign correspondent, Crane was a playwright and an instructor in economics. He was born in Buffalo, New York. The son of a Presbyterian minister, he graduated from Princeton University in 1922.

== Editor in Japan ==
Following stints with several newspapers in the United States, Crane went to Tokyo in 1925, to become financial editor of the Japan Advertiser. He remained until 1936, and gained a reputation as an authority on the Japanese economy.

In 1945 he began service in the Far East with the Office of Strategic Services. At the conclusion of World War II Crane joined the Tokyo Bureau of The New York Times. He was wounded while covering the Korean War.

== Author, teacher, and singer ==
He directed six plays for the Tokyo International Players, five of which he wrote. He wrote additional plays and four books about financial subjects. Crane taught at New York University from 1952 to 1953. His book on the stock market, The Sophisticated Investor went through two editions and numerous reprintings. He completed Smart Money, which was published by Random House in 1964.

While working for the Japan Advertiser, he became well known as an unusual singer for Columbia Records, singing Japanese-language versions of popular Western songs of the day, becoming known as the "Bing Crosby of Japan".

His wife was Esther and transcripts exist of his recollections on the Occupation Period of Japan in the Columbia University Oral History Research Office.

== TV appearance ==
Crane appeared as a featured subject on a 1961 episode of To Tell The Truth, hosted by Bud Collyer. The four panelists – Tom Poston, Kitty Carlisle, Don Ameche, and Peggy Cass – correctly identified him among the impostors playing the game alongside him.

== Death ==
Crane died in New York City in 1963, following an extended illness.
