= John Rich (war correspondent) =

John Rich (August 5, 1917 – April 9, 2014) was an American war correspondent for NBC News.

== Career ==
Rich spent nearly 30 years as a war correspondent for NBC News. A graduate of Bowdoin College, he became a U.S. Marine in 1942 and made four D-Day landings in the Pacific Theater. After the war, while working in Tokyo for William Randolph Hearst's International News Service, he interviewed General Douglas MacArthur and traveled with Emperor Hirohito. Additionally, he covered Shanghai's fall to the communists.

Rich began working for NBC in late 1950 and arrived in Korea less than a week after the war began. He worked there for over three years – longer than any other American correspondent. Having been used mostly for radio, he appeared on The Today Show to cover the ceasefire talks and eventually became a television correspondent. After having covered the Korean War, he took a wide variety of assignments, heading the NBC bureau in Berlin for four years and reporting on the Vietnam War for ten years. He reported on nearly every major armed conflict that occurred during his time at NBC. By the end of his career, he became NBC's senior Asian correspondent and was appointed vice-president of RCA Corporation.

After having been retired for many years, Rich was featured in NBC Nightly News' Making a Difference segment on July 24, 2008.

== Korean War coverage and photos ==
Rich, a Peabody Award winner, had finally released the photographs that he had taken while covering the Korean War in 1950. The photos, taken with a Nikon Camera and covering a wide variety of subjects from children to generals, are all in color, presenting a rare picture of the "Forgotten War", which is known mostly through black and white images. He had taken hundreds of photos of the Korean War, but never of any other war. Forty of the photos were displayed at the KORUS HOUSE in the Korean Embassy in Washington DC from July 24, 2008 and remained so until August, 11. The photos were then also featured in an article in the November 2008 issue of the Smithsonian Magazine.

In 2010, Rich sold the rights to distribute 173 photos to Seoul Selection for the first time. The same 173 photos were also turned into a book on May 12 with the same title.

In his later life, Rich lived on the coast of Maine in the house in which he was born.

== Books ==
- Korean War in Color: A Correspondent's Retrospective on a Forgotten War, Seoul Selection, 2010.
