= John Roderick (correspondent) =

American journalist

- Born: September 15, 1914; Waterville, Maine, United States
- Died: March 11, 2008 (aged 93); Honolulu, Hawaii, United States
- Occupations: Author and journalist

John Roderick (September 15, 1914 – March 11, 2008) was an American journalist and foreign correspondent for the Associated Press news service. Roderick was best known for covering Mao Zedong and other Chinese Communist guerillas while living with them in a cave during the mid-1940s. Roderick continued to cover China throughout the rest of his career. He was considered to be a leading "China watcher," who covered the country from before the Chinese Communist victory of 1949 to the economic reforms during the 1980s. He was once praised by Chinese Premier Zhou Enlai as the man who "opened the door" to China for foreign news media.

Roderick's career as a correspondent with the Associated Press spanned over fifty years, with postings in Asia, Europe and the Middle East. Roderick reopened the Associated Press bureau in Beijing in 1979. He continued to work with the AP as a special correspondent for the two decades following his retirement in 1984.

== Early life ==
John Roderick was born in Waterville, Maine, on September 14, 1914. He was orphaned when he was just 16 years old. His journalistic career began at the age of 15, when he began writing for a local newspaper, Waterville Morning Sentinel (now called The Central Maine Morning Sentinel). He graduated from Colby College before joining the Associated Press office in Portland, Maine, in 1937.

Roderick moved to the Associated Press' office in Washington D.C. in 1942. However, he was drafted into the United States Army in 1943 during World War II. He was assigned to the Office of Strategic Services, which was a precursor of the CIA, and sent to the city of Kunming, China, which is the capital of Yunnan province. Kunming was a strategically important city at the end of the Burma Road with a large United States military base. He rejoined the Associated Press after the end of World War II.

== China ==
Roderick remained in China as an Associated Press reporter after World War II. His first major postwar assignment was to cover the breakdown in relations between the Chinese nationalist Kuomintang government and the Chinese Communist forces led by Mao Zedong. The two sides had collaborated to fight the Japanese during World War II, but had turned on each other following the defeat of Japan. Like many of the other American, British and Australian war correspondents, Roderick was a military veteran of a war (World War II).

Roderick was 31 years old when he began living with leaders of the Chinese Communist rebel movement for seven months between 1945 and 1947. He resided with the rebel leadership, who included Mao Zedong, Zhou Enlai, Jiang Qing and other guerrilla leaders, at their headquarters in a series of caves in Yan'an, China. The city of Yan'an, which is located in central China, had been devastated by Japanese aerial bombings in 1938. Thus, by the mid-1940s it was largely composed of thousands of caves which had been dug out of the hills that surrounded the city and the nearby Gobi Desert. The Communist rebels, as well as reporters, such as Roderick, used the caves as a place to live and conduct their raids against their Japanese and Kuomintang opponents. Mao Zedong had been based in the city since 1935 as Ya'an was at the end of Mao's Long March.

Roderick lived at Ya'an (also called Yenan) in the same way as everyone else, including the Communist leadership. He lived and slept in a tiny cave with a makeshift bed and a pillow filled with sand. He filed his reports and typed out stories with a portable typewriter, which was next to a charcoal brazier. He observed Mao Zedong and other leaders during meal times, dances and lectures, which he would later chronicle in his book, "Covering China."

Roderick initially admired Mao Zedong and his supporters for their ideas saying, "I admired the fact that they were trying to do something for the poor Chinese." However, unlike other reporters, such as Edgar Snow, Roderick was never a full supporter of their goals. His opinion of Mao became much more negative following Mao takeover of China. Roderick disliked the brutality of Mao's rule which he observed, as well as the failure of many of his policies, such as the Cultural Revolution of the 1960s. Roderick famously called Jiang Qing (Madame Mao) "that evil bitch" long before she became known as a key member of the Gang of Four during the 1970s.

After he left Ya'an, Roderick covered the breakdown of peace talks between the Communists and the Kuomintang as well as the ensuing Chinese Civil War from Beijing. He continued to cover the Chinese Civil War from Shanghai, Nanjing and Beijing.

In 1948, Roderick was sent by the Associated Press to the Middle East to cover the establishment of the state of Israel. However, he remained engaged with China and its politics throughout his career. Though he often worked outside of China, he became known as a leading "China watcher" during the 1950s. He often studied scraps of information and Chinese Communist government news dispatches for clues to what was going on behind the scenes in China. Roderick though disliked to be called a "China watcher."

British Reuters correspondent David Chipp was allowed to open a Reuters news office in Beijing in 1956, passing over Roderick and the Associated Press. (The British government had informal relations with the Communist government at the time, while the American government did not.) Roderick was forced to report on China from Hong Kong and Tokyo. Finally, in 1971 Roderick was able to return to China when he accompanied the United States ping pong team on a trip to the country in 1971. The so-called "Ping Pong Diplomacy" was the first time that Americans had been invited to China since 1949.

Roderick was able to reopen the Associated Press bureau in Beijing in 1979, following the normalization of diplomatic relations between the United States and the People's Republic of China. He became head of the Beijing bureau.

== Other AP assignments ==
Roderick was sent to the Middle East from China in 1948. He arrived in the city of Amman, Jordan, just two weeks after the creation of the state of Israel. He covered the assassination of United Nations official Count Folke Bernadotte in Jerusalem by the Israeli extremist group, Lehi.

He next went to London and spent five years in Paris in the 1950s. He covered the fall of the French garrison at Dien Bien Phu in 1954 in Vietnam. He was later posted again in Paris and Hong Kong.

Roderick was posted to Tokyo, Japan, during the late 1950s. In 1959, Roderick became acquainted with Yoshihiro Takishita. During the late 1960s, Takishita learned that a 250-year-old farmhouse, located in Ise, Fukui prefecture (close to his hometown of Gifu) would be lost, following the construction of a reservoir. In order to save the farmhouse, Takishita arranged to have the it relocated to Kamakura, Japan for Roderick to make his home. Takishita, whom Roderick adopted as his son, went on to become an architect who specializes in preserving and restoring old post-and-beam farmhouses. Roderick later wrote about his experiences with the then 273-year-old Kamakura farmhouse and its restoration in his book, Minka: My Farmhouse in Japan, which was published by the Princeton Architectural Press in 2007. A translation into French has been published by Elytis.

Roderick was named an "Associated Press special correspondent" in 1977, becoming one of the AP's few reporters to hold the title.

He returned to Tokyo in 1980 as a special correspondent, one year after reopening the AP's office in Beijing. He was given a great deal of creative and journalistic freedom to travel throughout Asia and report on stories of interest to him.

Roderick reluctantly retired from active work at the Associated Press in 1984 at the age of 70. He later described himself as retiring "prematurely." However, he continued to report for the AP. The Japanese government awarded him with the Order of the Sacred Treasure for his work in reporting on Japanese and Asian issues in 1985.

Following his retirement, Roderick continued to write background stories on the Middle East and China. He spent much of his retirement at his restored farmhouse in Kamakura. He even wrote about his own 92nd birthday, in which the Associated Press honored him with a champagne lunch in 2006 in New York City. Also in 2006, Roderick began writing a series of monthly articles concerning China as part of his coverage of the upcoming 2008 Summer Olympics in Beijing.

== Kamakura minka ==
Roderick owned a traditional Japanese farmhouse, called a minka, in the city of Kamakura. He documented the history of the home and his adopted Japanese family in his 2007 book Minka: My Farmhouse in Japan.

In 2007, filmmaker Davina Pardo began a documentary on Roderick inspired by the book. Before filming could begin Roderick fell ill and was unable to participate, and so Pardo relied on Yoshihiro Takishita to tell their story. The film was funded in part by Kickstarter, and was featured in 2015 in The New York Times.

== Death ==
John Roderick completed his last piece for the Associated Press, a personal reflection, in February 2008. He died of heart failure and pneumonia at his apartment in Honolulu, Hawaii, on March 11, 2008, at the age of 93.

== Bibliography ==
- Minka: My Farmhouse in Japan (2007), Princeton Architectural Press, ISBN 978-1-568-98731-6
- Minka, ma ferme au Japon (2022), Elytis, ISBN 978-2-35639-325-8, translated into French by Benjamin Aguilar-Laguierce
