= Foreign Correspondents' Club of Japan =

Journalist organization in Tokyo, Japan

The Foreign Correspondents' Club of Japan (FCCJ)
- 日本外国特派員協会; Nihon Gaikoku Tokuhain Kyokai
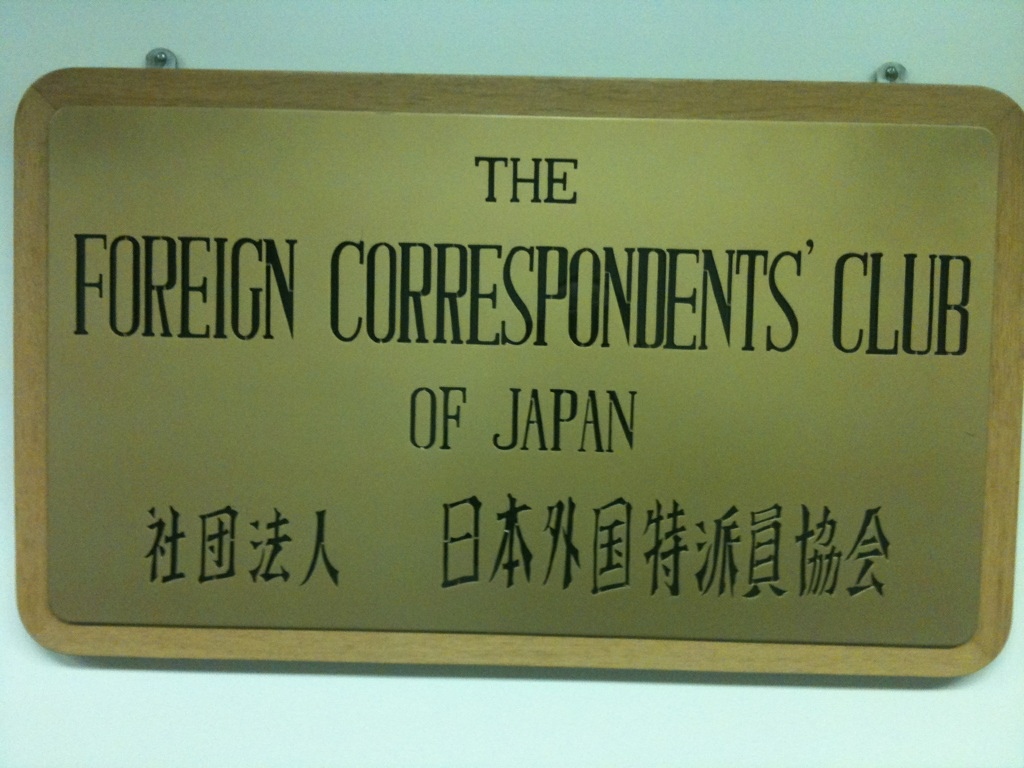
- Abbreviation: FCCJ
- Formation: September 1945
- Type: Public-interest incorporated association (公益社団法人, Koeki Shadan Hojin)
- Headquarters: Marunouchi Nijubashi Building 5F, 3-2-3 Marunouchi, Chiyoda-ku, Tokyo 100-0005
- Location: Marunouchi, Tokyo, Japan
- Coordinates: 35.6800317780329°N 139.7620650848573°E
- Members: 2,000
- Website: www.fccj.or.jp
- Formerly called: The Tokyo Correspondents Club

The Foreign Correspondents' Club of Japan (FCCJ) is a club established in 1945 to provide support to foreign journalists working in Post-World War II Japan has historically been situated in the vicinity of Ginza, Tokyo.

Today, the club offers a workroom facility, a library, a restaurant, a bar, and a steady stream of local and international speakers and panels, for its members. Its facilities are housed on the 5th and 6th floors of the Marunouchi Nijubashi Building near the Imperial Palace.

FCCJ publishes the monthly No. 1 Shimbun.

== Presidents ==
Past presidents include legendary war correspondent John Rich, leading "China watcher" John Roderick, later editor of the Chicago Sun-Times Frank Devine, 1951 Pulitzer Prize winner Max Desfor, and Burton Crane, also well known as a singer for Columbia Records, singing Japanese-language versions of popular Westerns songs of the day, becoming known as the "Bing Crosby of Japan".

Name	Affiliation	Period
Howard Handleman	International News Service	Oct - Dec 1945
Robert Cochrane	Baltimore Sun	Jan - June 1946
Walter Simmons	Chicago Tribune	July - Dec 1946
Tom Lambert	Associated Press	Jan - June 1947
George Folster	NBC	July 1947 - June 1948
Keyes Beech	Chicago Daily News	July 1948 - June 1949
Allen S. Raymond	Herald Tribune	July 1949 - June 1950
Burton Crane	The New York Times	July 1950 - June 1951
Joe Fromm	U.S. News & World Report	July 1951 - June 1952
William Jorden	Associated Press	July 1952 - June 1953
Dwight Martin	Time-Life	July 1953 - June 1954
Hessell Tiltman	Manchester Guardian	July 1954 - Sep 1954
Rutherford Poats	United Press	Oct 1954 - June 1955
Robert Eunson	Associated Press	July 1955 - Mar 1956
Marvin Stone	International News Service	Apr 1956 - Mar 1957
Earnest Hoberecht	United Press	Apr 1957 - Mar 1958
LeRoy Hansen	United Press	Apr 1958 - Dec 1958; July 1959 - Jun 1960
Sydney Brookes	Reuters	Dec 1958 - Jun 1959
Nathan Polowetzkey	Associated Press	July 1960 - Jun 1961
John Randolph	Associated Press	July 1961 - Jun 1962
Fritz Steck	Neue Zuercher Zeitung	July 1962 - Jun 1963
Lee Chia	Central News Agency	July 1963 - Jun 1964
Julius Cohn	Fairchild Publications	July 1964 - Jun 1965
John Roderick	Associated Press	July 1965 - Jun 1966
Frank Devine	Australian Newspapers Association	July 1966 - Jun 1967
Al Kaff	United Press International	July 1967 - Jun 1968
Henry Hartzenbusch	Associated Press	July 1968 - Jun 1969
Ugo Puntieri	Agenzia Nazionale Stampa Associata	July 1969 - Jun 1970
John Rich	NBC	July 1970 - Jun 1971
Pierre Brisard	AFP	July 1971 - Jun 1972
Mack Chrysler	U.S. News & World Report	July 1972 - Jun 1973
Sam Jameson	Los Angeles Times	July 1973 - Jun 1974
Max Desfor	Associated Press	July 1974 - Jun 1975
Al Cullison	Daily Telegraph	July 1975 - Jun 1976
Bill Shinn	Sisa News Agency	July 1976 - Jun 1977
Frederick Marks	United Press International	July 1977 - Jun 1978
Bruce Dunning	CBS	July 1978 - Jun 1979
Swadesh DeRoy	Press Trust of India	July 1979 - Jun 1980
Jack Russell	NBC	July 1980 - Jun 1981
Edwin Reingold	Time	July 1981 - Jun 1982
Karel van Wolferen	NRC-Handelsblad	July 1982 - Jun 1983
Ken Ishii	International Herald Tribune	July 1983 - Jun 1984
Mary Ann Maskery	ABC	July 1984 - Jun 1985
Jurek Martin	Financial Times	July 1985 - Jun 1986
Bruce Macdonell	GlobeNet	July 1986 - Jun 1987
Naoaki Usui	McGraw-Hill World News	July 1987 - Jun 1988
Andrew Horvat	The Independent	July 1988 - Jun 1989
Mike Tharp	U.S. News & World Report	July 1989 - Jun 1990
Peter McGill	The Observer	July 1990 - Jun 1991
David Powers	BBC	July 1991 - Jun 1992
Clayton Jones	Christian Science Monitor	July 1992 - Jun 1993
Lew Simons	Knight-Ridder	July 1993 - Jun 1994
Gebhard Hielscher	Süddeutsche Zeitung	July 1994 - Jun 1995
James Lagier	Associated Press	July 1995 - June 1996
William Dawkins	Financial Times	July 1996 - June 1997
Steven Herman	CBS Radio/Discovery Channel	July 1997 - June 1998
Robert Neff	Business Week	July 1998 - June 1999
Roger Schreffler	E.I.U.Publication	July 1999 - June 2000
James Treece	Automotive News	July 2000 - June 2001
Kazuo Abiko	Associated Press	July 2001 - June 2002
Hans van der Lugt	NRC-Handelsblad	July 2002 - June 2003
Myron Belkind	Associated Press	July 2003 - March 2004
Dan Sloan	Reuters	April 2004 - June 2004; July 2005 - June 2006
Anthony Rowley	Business Times	July 2004 - June 2005
Dennis Normile	Science	July 2006 - June 2007
Martyn Williams	IDG News Service	July 2007 - June 2008
Catherine Makino	IPS	July 2008 - June 2009
Monzurul Huq	Daily Prothom Alo	July 2009 - June 2010
Georges Baumgartner	Swiss Radio and Television	July 2010 - June 2013
Lucy Birmingham	Freelance	July 2013 - June 2015
James Simms	Forbes	July 2015 - Sept 2015
Suvendrini Kakuchi	University World News	Sept 2015 - June 2016
Peter Langan	Freelance	June 2016 - Sept 2016
Khaldon Azhari	PanOrient News	Sept 2016 - July 2018
Isabel Reynolds	Bloomberg L.P.	Sept 2020 - July 2021

== Membership ==
Club membership is around 1,450, with over 240 foreign correspondents (and their Japanese counterparts) as well as over 160 professional associates, mostly working for local media. Associate members number around 1,050 and include entrepreneurs, business executives, other professionals as well as authors and artists.

FCCJ Sign at Marunouchi Nijubashi Building, Tokyo, Japan	FCCJ Display: CP-16 Camera, Press Helmet, and Armbands	Lobby of FCCJ at old location in Yurakucho Denki Building Commemorative Cup from the Tokyo Press Club, 1975	FCCJ Press conference at Yurakucho Denki Building former site of FCCJ	Yurakucho Denki Building (left) former site of FCCJ

== Association ==
The FCCJ is not a member of the International Association of Press Clubs but has reciprocal agreements with a number of Foreign Correspondents' Clubs in Asia and North America:

- Foreign Correspondents' Club of Beijing
- Foreign Correspondents' Club, Hong Kong
- Seoul Foreign Correspondents’ Club
- Foreign Correspondents' Club of Thailand
- Singapore Press Club
- Colombo Swimming Club
- Hanoi Press Club
- The Foreign Correspondents' Club of South Asia
- Jaisal Club
- Overseas Press Club of America
- Omaha Press Club
- International Press Club of Chicago
- The National Press Club
- National Press Club of Canada

== See also ==
- Japan National Press Club
