= Johnnys =

Japanese boy band

Johnnys ジャニーズ
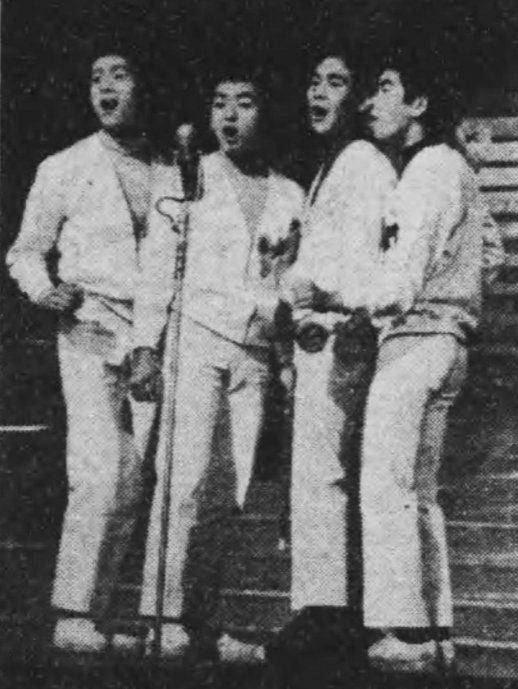

Background information
- Origin: Japan
- Genres: Pop; dance
- Years active: 1962–1967
- Label: JVC
- Past members: Teruhiko Aoi; Osami Iino; Hiromi Maie; Ryo Nakatani

Johnnys (ジャニーズ, Janīzu) was a Japanese boy band created by Johnny Kitagawa in 1962, before the formation of the Japanese talent agency Johnny & Associates. It was the first group to debut under the new agency.

== Career ==
=== Background ===
According to some historians and researchers who have followed the agency since its beginnings, such as Yoshiki Shuto, their debut would change the music industry in Japan, though their existence would not affect what could be considered their origin influence country: the United States.

Yoyogi Park, a few minutes' walk from Harajuku Station in Tokyo, was once a U.S. military housing district called Washington Heights, built in 1946 by the U. S. Armed Forces during the occupation of Japan by Allied forces. On the other side of the wire mesh fence there were rows of chic houses with white walls and colorful roofs wrapped in greenery and lawns spread out like a movie set. It was modeled after the American lifestyle. Kitagawa, who was born and raised as an American, and would later form Johnny & Associates, also known as Johnny's Office, lived in a room on the fourth floor of a dormitory in Washington Heights (Washington Heights was later returned to Japan and transformed into the Yoyogi Athletes' Village and the Yoyogi National Gymnasium in preparation for the 1964 Tokyo Olympics, and NHK began building a broadcasting center for international broadcasts of the Olympics.).

At the time, around 1953, Kitagawa was working for the U.S Embassy in Japan, as a member of the Military Assistance Advisory Group Japan (MAAGJ), while also teaching baseball to children, as a side job. The name of this youth baseball team was "Johnny's Team", at the suggestion of one of the members, Teruhiko Aoi. At the same time, Kitagawa's sister Mary was working in an American-style counter snack bar she owned. Both the baseball team and the snack bar had connections to the entertainment world, the team with the support by people such as wrestler Rikidōzan and actress Tomoko Matsushima, while the snack bar displayed their photos and autographs together with those of baseball players, movie stars, and popular singers. Around 1957, Kitagawa took several of the kids, including Hiromi Maie, who was in Elementary school, to Mary's American snack bar, to eat spaghetti with meat sauce prepared by her. The new taste was a winner.

In 1958, an 11-year-old boy, Ryo Nakatani, and his friends were playing in the vicinity of the off–limits housing complex, and, as with any child, curiosity got the best of them. They jumped over the fence and were met by someone, Kitagawa. Expecting to get scolded because of what they did, they were surprised when they got some Hershey's chocolates and just a warning not to do it again, as they would definitely get scolded. Nakatani and his friends would continue visiting Kitagawa, now their entry allowed by the sole mention of Kitagawa's name at the gate.

One day, Kitagawa could not get the boys to practice baseball because it was raining, so he decided to take the team to the movies at Marunouchi Piccadilly. There, they saw West Side Story. The boys were so fascinated by the musical about singing and dancing American delinquents that they went to the cinema again and again and began to learn the dance moves by imitating what they saw. Four of them, Teruhiko Aoi, Ryo Nakatani, Osami Iino, and Hiromi Maie, began to seriously dream of performing in a musical.

=== Early career ===
In order to develop a singing and dancing boy band, Kitagawa introduced the four to the New Performing Arts School managed by Taro Nawa, where they received proper training, and to Watanabe Productions. In April 1962, the elementary and junior high school division of the Nawa New Performing Arts Academy in Nishi-Ikebukuro, Tokyo, headed by 42-year-old Nawa, opened "Geiken Johnny's", a film, television, musical, and talent training school headed by 30-year-old Kitagawa. Nawa's wife, Midori Masago, was appointed principal.

In 1962, Johnnys had their first appearance on television, on NHK General TV's Yume de Aimashou as program's back dancers. Though that first month only silhouettes were shown, people were curious to know who they were. Before long, the group appeared at the Drum in Ikebukuro, the ACB in Shinjuku and the Mimatsu in Ginza, and in January 1963 they were backing dancers for Ito Yukari at the 19th Nichigeki Western Carnival, which was run by Watanabe Productions. By that time, the group was part of Watanabe Productions, but when Kitagawa established Johnny's Office in June 1964, they became the first affiliated artists of the new agency.

=== Debut and beyond ===
Their debut single "Wakai Namida" (1964) was composed by Hachidai Nakamura with the lyrics by Rokusuke Ei. Nakamura and Ei formerly made the music and lyric of Kyu Sakamoto's U.S. Billboard Hot 100 number-one single "Sukiyaki". The song was performed previously on the program Yume de Aimashou.

In May 1965, the group would make their stage acting debut in the work Homura no Kabu, written by Shintaro Ishihara. That same year, in October, their first eponymous program, Johnnys Nine Show, aired on Nippon Television in the Saturday at 9 p.m. timeslot. In April 1966, the program was moved to Fridays at 7 p.m. and renamed Johnnys Seven Show. The program ended in September 1966.

On December 31, 1965, Johnnys made their first appearance in the 16th NHK Kōhaku Uta Gassen at the Tokyo Takarazuka Theater. They sang "Mack the Knife". Their appearance opened the so-called "idol era" for the program.

In 1966, Kitagawa took the boys to Los Angeles, where they remained several months studying and honing their artistic skills. Kitagawa, thinking about the group's future, signed a contract with Warner Records hoping for an album release in the United States. Unfortunately, that would never happen. By early 1967, they returned to Japan.

=== 1967: The trial and the disbandment ===
On September 25, 1967, the magazine Josei Jishin published an article titled "Johnnys wo meguru “dōseiai” saiban Tōkyō chisai hōtei de bakuro sa reta 4-ri no privacy" regarding Kitagawa's trial for lewd homosexual acts. The four members of the group participated in the trial, but denied anything of the sort happening.

By now, Kitagawa had his sights on another group and had stopped paying attention to Johnnys. The group decided to disband. It was rumored that the true reason of the disbandment was that the members were sexually assaulted by Kitagawa.

== Johnnys influence in Johnny's and others ==
Johnnys was born thanks to an American of Japanese ancestry living in Washington Heights, an American complex in Japan, and was inspired by the "America" depicted in the movies. And yet, they would be barely known in that country.

The term "idol", as used to refer to entertainers or celebrities who are singers, dancers, or rappers, was first coined in Japan for young female singers in the J-pop music industry, after a 1963 French film, Cherchez l'idole (The Chase) starring actress Sylvie Vartan became extremely popular in Japan. Vartan, with her singing and youthful cute looks, was regarded by many as the inspiration for the first generation of idols in Japan. As for male idols, Kitagawa's Johnny & Associates, was the entertainment agency that would pioneer the idol system that still exists in Japan, with Kitagawa's group Johnnys considered the first male idol group. Many "Idol groups" from other countries' music, such as those from K-pop (Korea), C-pop (China), P-pop (Philippines) and the such, have been influenced by those in J-pop, some of them by J&A's groups.

Johnnys (the boy band) would later be known as "First Generation Johnnys" or "Founding Johnnys", while the term "Johnnys" would be left as its legacy, after the group's disbandment in November 1967. As with the name for the baseball team that gave origin to the musical group, the name Johnnys (also as Johnny's) would later be used as a reference for "Johnny's Office" and the talents signed to the agency.

While an idol is a figure who may or may not be especially good as a singer or actor, their power is to gain attention with their youthful looks, be it a girl idol or a boy idol. In the case of Johnny's idols, where some can be considered "bishōnen" (beautiful boys), and their looks can remain through their youth ("biseinen") or adulthood ("biman"), while others can be considered "kawaii" (cute), it became so important the image of the bishōnen that Johnnys-kei (じゃにーず系, Johnny’s type) is often used as a stand-in for the term. The word, despite referring to a male's looks, is not to be mistaken for the word "Ikemen", for the first refers more to a youthful man, while the latter to a "cool" adult or older man.

Johnnys were the first group to record the hit song "Never My Love", later released by the Association. In 1966, before the Association sang the song, Johnnys met producer Barry De Vorzon when they went to the U.S. to study showbiz, and he provided the song to them. The song was recorded by the Johnnys, but due to scheduling conflicts, it was never made into a record.

== Members ==
- Hiromi Maie (真家 ひろみ, Hiromi Maie) (November 1, 1946 - March 6, 2000)
- Osami Iino (飯野 おさみ, Iino Osami) (born August 23, 1946)
- Ryo Nakatani (中谷 良, Nakatani Ryō) (born September 18, 1947)
- Teruhiko Aoi (青井 輝彦, Aoi Teruhiko) (born January 10, 1948)

== Discography ==
=== Singles ===
1. Wakai Namida (Young Tears)
2. Wakai Yoru (Young Night)
3. Honō no Kaabu (Curved Flame)
4. Girl Happy
5. Eikō no March (Glorious March)
6. Kimi ga Wakamono Nara (You are a Young Man)
7. Naiteita Jenny (Crying Jenny)
8. Batman * used as the theme song for the Japanese airing of the television series Batman
9. Ōi Waai Chichichi
10. Kiri no Yoru no Aishuu (The Sorrow of the Night's Fog)
11. Tokei wo Tomete (Clock's Stopped)
12. Taiyō no Aitsu (Guy of the Sun)
13. Itsuka Dokoka de (Someday, anywhere)
14. Wakai Nihon no Uta (Song of Japan's Youth)

=== Albums ===
1. Jyaniizu to Amerika Ryokou ~ Jyaniizu Shou Jikkyou Rokuon (Johnnys and an American Journey ~ Johnnys Real Recording~)
