= Four Leaves =

Japanese boy band

Four Leaves フォーリーブス
- Origin: Japan
- Genre: Pop
- Years active: 1967–1978; 2002–2009
- Label: CBS Sony
- Past members: Toshio Egi; Koji Kita; Masao Orimo; Eiji Nagata; Takashi Aoyama

Four Leaves (フォーリーブス, Fō Rībusu) was a Japanese boy band from the talent agency Johnny & Associates. Four Leaves was one of the earliest acts produced by the agency, and the four-member group first formed in 1967 and made their record debut with the single "Olivia no Shirabe" (オリビアの調べ) the following year. They disbanded in 1978 due to popularity loss, but they reunited in 2002 until 2009.

== Members ==
- Toshio Egi (1967–1978, 2002–2009)
- Kōji Kita (1967–1978, 2002–2009; died 2012)
- Masao Orimo (1967–1978, 2002–2009)
- Takashi Aoyama (1968–1978, 2002–2009; died 2009)
- Eiji Nagata (1967–1968)

== Kōhaku Uta Gassen Appearances ==
Year	#	Song	No.	VS	Remarks
1970 (Showa 45)/21st	1	Ashita Ga Umareru (あしたが生まれる)	20/24	Chiyo Okumura	
1971 (Showa 46)/22nd	2	Chikyū Wa Hitotsu (地球はひとつ)	13/25	Yukiji Asaoka	Performed Minato No Wakareuta(港の別れ唄) with Fuji Keiko to replace Cool Five that absents.
1972 (Showa 47)/23rd	3	Natsu No Fureai (夏のふれあい)	2/23	Akiko Wada	
1973 (Showa 48)/24th	4	Wakai Futari Ni Nani Ga Okoru (若いふたりに何が起る)	7/22	Katsuko Kanai	
1974 (Showa 49)/25th	5	Isoge! Wakamono (急げ!若者)	4/25	Rumiko Koyanagi	
1975 (Showa 50)/26th	6	Happy People (ハッピー・ピープル)	11/24	Agnes Chan	
1976 (Showa 51)/27th	7	Odoriko (踊り子)	3/24	Candies	
