= Hey! Say! JUMP discography =

- Studio albums: 13
- Extended plays: 1
- Compilation albums: 1
- Singles: 40
- Video albums: 17
- Music videos: 43

The discography of Hey! Say! JUMP features 13 studio albums, 34 singles and 43 music videos, all released through Storm Labels. The group activities started when the temporary five-member group Hey! Say! 7 were put together to provide the theme song for the anime Lovely Complex. The original members were Yuya Takaki, Daiki Arioka, Ryosuke Yamada, Yuto Nakajima, Yuri Chinen. The five Hey! Say! 7 members were later joined by another four idols, Kota Yabu, Kei Inoo, Hikaru Yaotome and Keito Okamoto, thus creating the group Hey! Say! JUMP, the agency's largest group in history. The group made their CD debut through "Ultra Music Power" which topped the Oricon singles chart. Hey! Say! JUMP released their first full-length studio album, JUMP No. 1 on July 7, 2010.

== Studio albums ==
List of albums, with selected chart positions
Title	Album details	Peak positions			Sales	Certifications
Title	Album details	JPN	TWN (Note: The G-Music chart was established in July 2005 and only archives the top 20 releases.)	TWN East Asian (Note: Position was taken from 2010 week 30 for JUMP No. 1, 2012 week 25 for JUMP World 2014 week 36 for S3ART.)	Sales	Certifications
JUMP No. 1	Released: July 7, 2010; Label: J Storm; Formats: CD	1	13	3	190,000	RIAJ: Gold
JUMP World	Released: June 6, 2012; Label: J Storm; Formats: CD, CD+DVD	1	19	2	154,000	RIAJ: Gold
S3art	Released: June 18, 2014; Label: J Storm; Formats: CD, CD+DVD	1	6	1	159,000	RIAJ: Gold
JUMPing Car	Released: June 24, 2015; Label: J Storm; Formats: CD, CD+DVD	1	—	—	205,588	RIAJ: Gold
Dear	Released: July 27, 2016; Label: J Storm; Formats: CD, CD+DVD	1	—	—	309,570	RIAJ: Platinum
Hey! Say! JUMP 2007-2017 I/O (10th Anniversary Album)	Released: July 26, 2017; Label: J Storm; Formats: CD, 2CD+DVD, 3CD	1	—	—	380,291	RIAJ: Platinum
Sense or Love	Released: August 22, 2018; Label: J Storm; Formats: CD, CD+DVD	1	—	—	250,000	RIAJ: Platinum
Parade	Released: October 30, 2019; Label: J Storm; Formats: CD, CD+DVD	1	—	—	250,000	RIAJ: Platinum
Fab! (Music Speaks.)	Released: December 16, 2020; Label: J Storm; Formats: CD, CD+DVD	1	—	—	250,000	RIAJ: Platinum
Filmusic!	Released: August 24, 2022; Label: J Storm; Formats: CD, CD+Blu-ray, CD+DVD	1	—	—	202,370	RIAJ: Gold
Pull Up!	Released: December 6, 2023; Label: J Storm; Formats: CD, CD+Blu-ray, CD+DVD	1	—	—	199,895	RIAJ: Gold
H+	Released: November 27, 2024; Label: Storm Labels; Formats: CD, CD+Blu-ray, CD+DVD	1	—	—	160,257	RIAJ: Gold
S Say	Released: November 26, 2025; Label: Storm Labels; Formats: CD, CD+Blu-ray, CD+DVD	1	—	—	201,051	RIAJ: Gold
Juliet	Released: November 11, 2026; Label: Storm Labels; Formats: CD, CD+Blu-ray, CD+DVD	1	—	—	209,704	

== Extended plays ==
List of extended plays, with selected details, chart positions and sales
Title	Details	Peak positions	Sales
Title	Details	JPN Cmb.	Sales
P.U!	Released: October 24, 2023; Label: J Storm; Formats: Digital download, streaming	3	JPN: 24,071

== Singles ==
Title	Year	Peak chart positions	Sales	Certifications	Album	Notes and Ref.
Title	Year	JPN	Sales	Certifications	Album	Notes and Ref.
"Hey! Say!" (as Hey! Say! 7)	2007	1	196,118	Gold	—N/a	
"Ultra Music Power"	2007	1	304,101	Platinum	JUMP No. 1	
"Dreams Come True"	2008	1	250,000	Platinum	JUMP No. 1	
"Your Seed/Bōken Rider"	2008	1	208,113	Gold	JUMP No. 1	
"Mayonaka no Shadow Boy"	2008	1	266,193	Platinum	JUMP No. 1	
"Hitomi no Screen"	2010	1	250,206	Platinum	JUMP No. 1	
"Arigatō (Sekai no Doko ni Ite mo)"	2010	1	188,555	Gold	JUMP World	
"Over"	2011	1	297,781	Platinum	JUMP World	
"Magic Power"	2011	1	254,171	Platinum	JUMP World	
"Super Delicate"	2012	1	290,971	Platinum	JUMP World	
"Come On A My House"	2013	1	250,000	Platinum	S3ART	
"Ride with Me"	2013	1	250,000	Platinum	S3ART	
"AinoArika/Aisureba Motto Happy Life"	2014	1	250,000	Platinum	S3ART	
"Weekender/Asu e no YELL"	2014	1	214,581	Gold	JUMPing CAR	
"Koro Sensations" (as Sensations)	2015	1			JUMPing CAR	Theme song for Yamada's film Assasination Classroom
"Chau#/我 I Need You"	2015	1	170,489	Gold	JUMPing CAR	
"Kimi Attraction"	2015	1	250,000	Platinum	Dear	
"Sayonara Sensation" (as Sensations)	2016	1				Theme song for Yamada's film Assassination Classroom: Graduation
"Maji Sunshine"	2016	1	308,610	Platinum		
"Fantastic Time"	2016	1	288,361	Platinum	Hey! Say! JUMP 2007-2017 I/O	
"Give Me Love"	2016	1	282,652	Platinum	Hey! Say! JUMP 2007-2017 I/O	
"Over the Top"	2017	1	300,034	Platinum	Hey! Say! JUMP 2007-2017 I/O	
"Precious Girl / Are You There?"	2017	1	285,409	Platinum	Sense or Love	
"White Love"	2017	1	320,310	Platinum	Sense or Love	
"Maeomuke" (マエヲムケ)	2018	1	270,447	Platinum	Sense or Love	Theme song for Yamada's drama The Kitazawas: We Mind Our Own Business
"Cosmic Human"	2018	1	250,000	Platinum	Parade	
"Lucky-Unlucky / Oh! My Darling"	2019	1	250,000	Platinum	Parade	
"Ai Dake Ga Subete -What do you want?-" (愛だけがすべて -What do you want?-)	2019	—			Parade	
"Fanfare!" (ファンファーレ!)	2019	1	248,783		Parade	
"I am / Muah Muah"	2020	1	226,381	Gold	Fab! -Music speaks.-	
"Last Mermaid..."	2020	1	220,690	Gold	Fab! -Music speaks.-	
"Your Song"	2020	1	250,000	Platinum	Fab! -Music speaks.-	
"Negative Fighter" (ネガティブファイター)	2021	1	250,000	Platinum	Filmusic!	
"Gunjou Runaway" (群青ランナウェイ)	2021	1	254,663	Platinum	Filmusic!	
"Sing-along"	2021	1	250,000	Platinum	Filmusic!	
“Area / Koi wo Surunda / Haru Tsubame" (a r e a / 恋をするんだ / 春玄鳥)	2022	1	250,000	Platinum	Filmusic!	
"Dear My Lover / Uraomote" (Dear My Lover / ウラオモテ)	2023	1	259,605	Platinum	P.U! (Dear My Lover); Pull Up! (Uraomote)	
"UMP"	2024	1	216,522	Platinum		
"Encore"	2025	1	204,965	Gold		"Encore" is the theme song for the drama Parallel Fūfu Shinda "Boku to Tsuma" no Shinjitsu
"Ghost"	2025	—				Digital single
"Hanikami" (ハニカミ)	2026	1	224,669	Platinum		

== Video albums ==
List of media, with selected chart positions
Title	Album details	Peak positions		Certifications
Title	Album details	JPN	TWN (Note: Position was taken from 2008 week 22 for Debut & First Concert, 2009 week 22 for JUMP-ing Tour, 2011 week 8 for Summary 2010, 2012 week 15 for Summary 2011.)	Certifications
Hey! Say! JUMP Debut & First Concert Ikinari! in Tokyo Dome	Released: April 30, 2008; Label: J Storm/Storm Labels; Format: DVD, Blu-ray	2	2	RIAJ: Gold
Hey! Say! JUMP-ing Tour '08-'09	Released: April 29, 2009; Label: J Storm/Storm Labels; Format: DVD, Blu-ray	1	2	RIAJ: Gold
Hey! Say! 2010 TEN JUMP	Released: September 15, 2010; Label: J Storm/Storm Labels; Format: DVD, Blu-ray	1	—	RIAJ: Gold
Summary 2010	Released: January 12, 2011; Label: J Storm/Storm Labels; Format: DVD, Blu-ray	1	3	
Summary 2011 in Dome	Released: March 7, 2012; Label: J Storm/Storm Labels; Format: DVD, Blu-ray	1	3	
JUMP World 2012	Released: November 7, 2012; Label: J Storm/Storm Labels; Format: DVD, Blu-ray	1	—	
Zenkoku e JUMP Tour 2013	Released: November 13, 2013; Label: J Storm/Storm Labels; Format: DVD, Blu-ray	1	—	
Hey! Say! JUMP LIVE TOUR 2014 S3ART	Released: February 18, 2015; Label: J Storm/Storm Labels; Format: DVD, Blu-ray	1	—	
Hey! Say! JUMP LIVE TOUR 2015 JUMPing CARnival	Released: February 10, 2016; Label: J Storm/Storm Labels; Format: DVD, Blu-ray	1	—	
Hey! Say! JUMP LIVE TOUR 2016 DEAR.	Released: April 26, 2017; Label: J Storm/Storm Labels; Format: DVD, Blu-ray	1	—	
Hey! Say! JUMP I/Oth Anniversary Tour 2017-2018	Released: June 27, 2018; Label: J Storm/Storm Labels; Format: DVD, Blu-ray	1	—	
Hey! Say! JUMP LIVE TOUR SENSE or LOVE	Released: July 24, 2019; Label: J Storm; Format: DVD, Blu-ray	1	—	
Hey! Say! JUMP LIVE TOUR 2019-2020 PARADE	Released: August 5, 2020; Label: J Storm; Format: DVD, Blu-ray	1	—	
Hey! Say! JUMP Fab! -Live speaks.-	Released: July 31, 2021; Label: J Storm; Format: DVD, Blu-ray	—	—	
Hey! Say! JUMP 15th Anniversary LIVE TOUR 2022-2023	Released: July 12, 2023; Label: J Storm/Storm Labels; Format: Blu-ray, DVD	1	—	
Hey! Say! JUMP LIVE TOUR 2023-2024 PULL UP!	Released: August 20, 2024; Label: Storm Labels; Format: Blu-ray, DVD	1	—	
Hey! Say! JUMP LIVE TOUR 2024-2025 H^{+}	Released: July 30, 2025; Label: Storm Labels; Format: Blu-ray, DVD	1	—	
Hey! Say! JUMP DOME TOUR 2025-2026 S say	Released: September 02, 2026 (National Day); Label: Storm Labels; Format: Blu-ray, DVD	TBA	—	

== Music videos ==
Year	Song	Director(s)	Notes	Ref.
2007	"Hey! Say!"	Hideo Kawatani (河谷英夫)	As Hey! Say! 7	
2007	"Ultra Music Power"	Wataru Takeshi	Debut single	
2008	"Dreams Come True"	Wataru Takeshi		
2008	"Your Seed"	Wataru Takeshi		
2008	"Mayonaka no Shadow Boy'			
2010	"Hitomi no Screen"			
2010	"Arigatō (Sekai no Doko ni Ite mo)"			
2011	"OVER"	Tatsuya Murakami (ムラカミタツヤ, Murakami Tatsuya)		
2011	"Ai-ing –Aishiteru"			
2011	"Magic Power"	Tatsuya Murakami		
2012	"SUPER DELICATE"	Tatsuya Murakami		
2012	"Wonderland Train"			
2012	"Th • ri • ll"			
2013	"Come On A My House"			
2013	"Ride With Me"			
2014	"AinoArika"	Shintaro Ebihara		
2014	"Aisureba Motto Happy Life"	Hara Yuya		
2014	"Weekender"	Hideaki Fukui		
2014	"Asu e no YELL"	Hideaki Fukui		
2014	"FOREVER"			
2014	"Setsunasa, Hikikae ni"			
2015	" Koro Sensations (Operation Mode)"		(as Sensations)	
2015	" Koro Sensations (Battle Mode)"		(as Sensations)	
2015	"Chau#"			
2015	"Kira Kira Hikare"			
2015	"JUMPing CAR"			
2015	"Union"			
2015	"Kimi Attraction"			
2016	" Sayonara Sensation (New Gear Mode) "		(as Sensations)	
2016	" Sayonara Sensation (Final Battle Mode)"		(as Sensations)	
2016	"Maji SUNSHINE"			
2016	"Masquerade"			
2016	"Mr. Flawless"	Hideaki Fukui		
2016	"Fantastic Time"			
2016	"Give Me Love"	Santa Yamagishi		
2017	"OVER THE TOP"			
2017	"Funky Time"			
2017	"Precious Girl"			
2017	"White Love"	Hideaki Sunaga		
2018	"Maeomuke"	Hideaki Fukui		
2018	"COSMIC ☆ HUMAN"	Masatoshi Takizawa		
2018	"Yancha na Hero"	Hideaki Sunaga	Hey! Say! 7	
2018	"BANGER NIGHT"	Hideaki Sunaga		
2019	"Lucky-Unlucky"	Takuya Tada		
2019	"Oh! my darling"	Takuya Tada		
2019	"Ai Dake Ga Subete -What do you want?-"	Hideaki Sunaga & Nozomi Tanaka		
2019	"Fanfare!"	Takuya Tada		
2019	"Kemono to bara"	Yasuhiro Arafune		
2019	"Parade ga hajimaru"	Shintaro Sakai		
2020	"I am"	Takaya Ohata		
2020	"Muah-Muah"	Katsuhito Oikawa		
2020	"Last Mermaid..."	Hideaki Fukui		
2020	"Your song"	Choku & Kei Takahashi		
2020	"Fab-ism"	Hideaki Fukui		
2020	"Ōkami seinen"	Kei Takahashi		
2020	"Senya ichiya"	Kei Takahashi		
2020	"Naimononedari"	Kei Takahashi		
2021	"Negative Fighter"	Takuro Ohkubo		
2021	"Gunjou Runaway"	Takuro Ohkubo		
2021	"Sing Along"	Takuro Ohkubo		
2021	"Letter"			
2022	"Koi wo surunda"	Hideaki Sunaga		
2022	"area"	Masatoshi Takizawa		
2022	"Haru Tsubame"	Takuya Tada		
2022	"Fate or Destiny"	Masaki Ohkita		
2023	"Dear my Lover	Takuro Ohkubo		
2023	"Ura Omote"	MIZUNO CABBAGE		
2024	"UMP"	Hidejin Kato		
2024	"Donkey Gongs"	Yasuhiro Arafune		
2024	"eek!!"	UDO & Eri Yoshikawa		
2025
2025	"encore"	Takuro Ohkubo		
2025	"SUPER CRUSIN'"	Yoshiharu Seri		
2025	"Ghost"	MONA, Wakui Ray & Eri Yoshikawa		
2025	"Symphony"	MONA, Wakui Ray, Takahiro Morimoto		
2025	"Merori"	Yoshika Nakayama & Yuichiro Saeki		
2025	"Run This World"		Collaboration with JRA	
2026
2026	"Honey Coming ~Hanikami~"	Ryohei Shingou & Tomokazu Saito		
2026	"Saikai Ai Kitai shite Cry"	YERD		
2026	"Romeo & Juliet+"	Takuya Tada		
2026	"TRUE"	Hana Matsumoto & Yuichiro Saeki		
