= Hey! Say! JUMP 2007–2017 I/O =

Compilation album by Hey! Say! JUMP
- Released: July 26, 2017
- Recorded: 2007–2017
- Label: J Storm

Hey! Say! JUMP chronology
DEAR (2016)	Hey! Say! JUMP 2007–2017 I/O (2017)	TBA

Hey! Say! JUMP 2007–2017 I/O is the compilation album by Japanese all-male band Hey! Say! JUMP. The album was released on July 26, 2017 in Japan under their record label J-Storm in three editions: 2 types of first-run limited edition and regular edition. The album is sold for 297 thousand copies in the first week, and topped Oricon's weekly chart on August 7, 2017.

== Album information ==
The album title, I/O, is pronounced as input/output. It also to be written as "10", as the album is released to celebrate the group's 10th anniversary in November 2017. It contains all singles from Hey! Say! JUMP's very first single, "Ultra Music Power" until their 22nd single, "Over the Top" that was released in February 2017. In the first-run limited edition 2, the top 10 songs were determined through fan voting.

The album was released in 3 editions: the first-run limited edition 1 includes a special packaging, 40 pages "I/Oth Anniversary" special photobook, 2 CDs contains 23 singles, and a DVD of music video collection contains 21 songs. The first-run limited edition 2 includes a special packaging, 40 pages lyrics booklet, 2 CDs contains 23 singles, and a CD contains 10 top songs voted by fans. The regular edition includes a 32 pages lyrics booklet, an alternative cover package, and 2 CD contains 23 singles and 2 newly recorded songs.

=== Songs ===
The first-run limited edition 2 added songs that previously only been sung on concerts and songs that was included in the group's previously released album. All songs were voted by the fans. The regular edition added 2 newly recorded songs: "I/O" and "H.Our time." "I/O" (pronounced as Input Output) is created to celebrate the group's 10th anniversary that means "so far" and "from now on." The second new song "H.Our Time" is the group's first song to be written by all of the Hey! Say! JUMP's members and with melody composed by Keito Okamoto. The song was made with the feelings of 9 members who make the lyrics in relay form.

== Track listing ==
CD 1 track listing
No.	Title	Lyrics	Music	Length
1.	"Ultra Music Power"	MSS	Kōji Makaino, Chokkaku
2.	"Dreams Come True"	Yōji Kubota	Kōji Makaino, Chokkaku
3.	"Your Seed"	ma-saya	h-wonder, ha-j
4.	"Bōken Rider" (冒険ライダー)	Akihiko Nakahara	Tsukasa, Motoki Funayama
5.	"Mayonaka no Shadow Boy" (真夜中のシャドーボーイ)	ma-saya	Kōji Makaino, Tomoki Ishizuka
6.	"Hitomi no Screen" (瞳のスクリーン)	Nobuko Morino	Kōji Makaino, Masaya Suzuki
7.	"Arigatō (Sekai no Doko ni Ite mo)" (「ありがとう」〜世界のどこにいても〜)	Kaori Moriwa, Masayo Murano, Ami	Steven Lee
8.	"Over"	zopp, Masayo Murano	Devanté，Tomas Cederholm，Filip Lindfors, Motoki Funayama
9.	"Magic Power"	Kana Okajima	Yusuke Itagaki, Masato Ishizuka
10.	"Super Delicate"	Shinji Nojima	Yūsuke Katō, Niklas Edberger
11.	"Come On a My House"	Komei Kobayashi	Kōji Makaino, Makoto Ikuta
12.	"Ride with Me"	Staxx T	☆Taku Takahashi, Minami

CD 2 track listing
No.	Title	Lyrics	Music	Length
1.	"AinoArika"	Hikari, Hikaru Yaotome	Hikari, Tetsuya Takahashi
2.	"Aisureba Motto Happy Life" (愛すればもっとハッピーライフ)	Masahiro Kawaura	Masahiro Kawaura, Chokkaku
3.	"Weekender" (ウィークエンダー)	Yakumo Mitsui, Vandrythem	Kazuhiro Hara, Komu
4.	"Asu e no Yell" (明日へのYELL)	Takuya Harada	Takuya Harada, CHOKKAKU
5.	"Chau#"	Seiko Fujibayashi	Takafumi Iwasaki
6.	"Oo I Need You" (我 I Need You)	Ehiko Nakamura	Ehiko Nakamura
7.	"Kimi Attraction" (キミアトラクション)	MiNE, Susumu Kawaguchi	Chokkaku, Susumu Kawaguchi, Christofer Erixon, Joakim Bjornberg
8.	"Maji Sunshine" (真剣SUNSHINE)	Komu	Kazuhiro Hara
9.	"Fantastic Time"	Koudai Iwatsubo	Aibi Albertsson, KOUDAI IWATSUBO, Tomoyoshi Ishizuka, Masayuki Iwata
10.	"Give Me Love"	Vandrythem	Takuya Harada, Susumu Kawaguchi, Christofer Erixon, Tetsuya Takahashi
11.	"Over the Top"	twelvelayers	twelvelayers, SSKHz
12.	"I/O" (Regular edition-exclusive)	Kaori Moriwaka, m.piece	Steven Lee, Adrian McKinnon, MiNE, Atsushi Shimada
13.	"H.Our Time" (Regular edition-exclusive)	Hey! Say! JUMP	Keito Okamoto, ha-j

CD 3 (Fan voted songs) track listing
No.	Title	Lyrics	Music	Length
1.	"To the Top"	Watari Morita, Hiroko Koma, Natsuko Kondō	J.Carbone, S.Lee, Tomoki Ishizuka
2.	"Tobira no Mukō" (トビラの向こう)	micro+grande	micro+grande, Junjiro Seki
3.	"Star Time"	Yōji Kubota	Steven Lee&JoeyCarbone, Chokkaku
4.	"Shin-Gi-Tai" (心・技・体)	Yōji Kubota	M.Y, ha-j
5.	"Aishiteru" (愛ing -アイシテル-)	Ami	7.4.7
6.	"ChikuTaku"	koma'n	koma'n, Motoki Funayama
7.	"Viva! 9's Soul" (2017 ver.)	Vandrythem	Kenji Isozaki, Shindo Asari, Fumiya Shaoyama
8.	"Romeo & Juliet"	Ami	Andreas Ohrn, Henrik Smith, Filip Lampell, Yoshimasa Kawabata
9.	"Taiyō ni Love Motion!" (太陽にLOVE MOTION!)	Tomoya Kinoshita	Bounceback, Kazunori Watanabe
10.	"From"	Nobuhiro Tahara	Nobuhiro Tahara, Tomoo Ishizuka

Music video (DVD)
No.	Title	Lyrics	Music	Length
1.	"Ultra Music Power"	MSS	Kōji Makaino, Chokkaku
2.	"Dreams Come True"	Yōji Kubota	Kōji Makaino, Chokkaku
3.	"Your Seed"	ma-saya	h-wonder, ha-j
4.	"Mayonaka no Shadow Boy" (真夜中のシャドーボーイ)	ma-saya	Kōji Makaino, Tomoki Ishizuka
5.	"Hitomi no Screen" (瞳のスクリーン)	Nobuko Morino
6.	"Arigatō (Sekai no Doko ni Ite mo)" (「ありがとう」〜世界のどこにいても〜)	Kaori Moriwa, Masayo Murano, Ami	Steven Lee
7.	"Over"	zopp, Masayo Murano	Devanté，Tomas Cederholm，Filip Lindfors, Motoki Funayama
8.	"Magic Power"	Kana Okajima	Yusuke Itagaki, Masato Ishizuka
9.	"Super Delicate"	Shinji Nojima	Yūsuke Katō, Niklas Edberger
10.	"Come On a My House"	Komei Kobayashi	Kōji Makaino, Makoto Ikuta
11.	"Ride with Me"	Staxx T	☆Taku Takahashi, Minami
12.	"AinoArika"	Hikari, Hikaru Yaotome	Hikari, Tetsuya Takahashi
13.	"Aisureba Motto Happy Life" (愛すればもっとハッピーライフ)	Masahiro Kawaura	Masahiro Kawaura, Chokkaku
14.	"Weekender" (ウィークエンダー)	Yakumo Mitsui, Vandrythem	Kazuhiro Hara, Komu
15.	"Asu e no Yell" (明日へのYELL)	Takuya Harada	Takuya Harada, Chokkaku
16.	"Chau#"	Seiko Fujibayashi	Takafumi Iwasaki
17.	"Kimi Attraction" (キミアトラクション)	MiNE, Susumu Kawaguchi	Chokkaku, Susumu Kawaguchi, Christofer Erixon, Joakim Bjornberg
18.	"Maji Sunshine" (真剣SUNSHINE)	KOMU	Kazuhiro Hara
19.	"Fantastic Time"	Koudai Iwatsubo	Aibi Albertsson, Koudai Iwatsubo, Tomoyoshi Ishizuka, Masayuki Iwata
20.	"Give Me Love"	Vandrythem	Takuya Harada, Susumu Kawaguchi, Christofer Erixon, Tetsuya Takahashi
21.	"Over the Top"	twelvelayers	twelvelayers, SSKHz
