= Sense or Love =

SENSE or LOVE

Studio album by Hey! Say! JUMP
- Released: August 22, 2018 (Japan)
- Recorded: 2018
- Genre: J-pop
- Label: J Storm, Johnny & Associates

Hey! Say! JUMP chronology
Hey! Say! JUMP 2007-2017 I/O (2017)	SENSE or LOVE (2018)

SENSE or LOVE is Hey! Say! JUMP's sixth album; released 2 years after their previous album, DEAR. It was released on August 22, 2018 and is the first album with 8 members after Keito Okamoto's decision to go into hiatus and continue his studies in the United States of America.

== Album information ==
SENSE or LOVE takes "dance" as its theme. It features a lead track titled "BANGER NIGHT." The song is described as the group's most aggressive dance. The album will also includes 16 songs including their previously released singles: "White Love," "Maeomuke," and "Precious Girl." The group's latest single that was released on August 1, "COSMIC☆HUMAN," is not included. The limited edition includes 8 solo songs from each members (excluding Okamoto) and a music video and making of "BANGER NIGHT," and a special packaging with a 60-page photo booklet and lyrics. The first press regular includes 2 bonus tracks each from the group's sub units Hey! Say! 7 and Hey! Say! BEST and the regular edition includes a bonus track and a poster-ype foldable lyric booklet.

== Track list ==
Included in all editions
No.	Title	Lyrics	Music	Length
1.	"White Love"	m.piece	Yūichi Tajika, m.piece, SSKHz
2.	"BANGER NIGHT"	MiNE	Tommy Clint, Kenichi Sakamuro
3.	"Dance The Night Away"	m.piece	Victor Sagfors, Ricky Hanley, SSKHz
4.	"Joōbachi" (女王蜂)	Kelly	Susumu Kawaguchi, MiNE, Atsushi Shimada, Shū Kanematsu, Ryōta Nozaki (Jazztronik)
5.	"One & One Makes Two"	TOA	Mayu Wakisaka, Min Lee, Naoki Endō
6.	"Maeomuke" (マエヲムケ)	MICO#	Victor Sagfors, KOUDAI IWATSUBO, Naoki Endō
7.	"TO THE GALAXY"	TOA	Andreas Oberg, Drew Ryan Scott, Stephan Elfgren
8.	"Jealous guy"	MICO#	HIKARI, Geek Boy Al Swettenham, Alcedo
9.	"Mata Kono Basho de" (またこの場所で)	ha-j	Dr.Hardcastle, m.piece, ha-j
10.	"Saigo no Love Song" (最後のラブソング)	m.piece, RT2	Kengo Minamida, Alcedo
11.	"Precious Girl"	MICO#	Takuya Harada, MiNE, Atsushi Shimada, Aaltostratus
12.	"FLASH"	twelvelayers	twelvelayers, Naoki Endō
13.	"Swinging days"	Ami	Takuya Harada, Christofer Erixon, Joakim Bjornberg, Hirofumi Sasaki
14.	"City Wander"	Komei Kobayashi	Andy Love, Joacim Persson, Johan Alkenas, Johan Alkenas
15.	"We Believe"	twelvelayers	twelvelayers, Aaltostratus, Taku Yoshioka
16.	"OLÉ!"	MICO#, Shigeo (Rap)	Manabu Marutani, Command Freaks, ha-j
17.	"JOURNEY"	twelvelayers	twelvelayers, SSKHz

Limited edition exclusive
No.	Title	Lyrics	Music	Length
1.	"Do It Again" (Ryosuke Yamada solo)	Raccoon	Raccoon, Andrew Choi
2.	"159" (Yuri Chinen solo)	Hanagoromu	Peter Boyes, Jon Hallgren, GRP
3.	"Waiting for the rain" (Yuto Nakajima solo)	Ami	Hiroshi Kido, Taku Yoshioka
4.	"Jōken Hansha" (条件反射; Kei Inoo solo)	Tomiya Hazuki	Kevin Charge, HIKARI, Akiwo Denno
5.	"Bubble Gum" (Daiki Arioka solo)	Yuki Tsujimura	Yuki Tsujimura
6.	"Daimei no Nai Monogatari" (題名の無い物語; Yuya Takaki solo)	zopp	Susumu Kawaguchi, Shun Kusakawa
7.	"PINK" (Hikaru Yaotome solo)	Taka Ruscar	STEVEN LEE, Andreas Oberg, Jesper Naenfeldt, Henrik Liljequist
8.	"Ryūsei no Uta" (流星の詩; Kota Yabu solo)	RT2	TAKAROT, Andrew Choi, DEEZ, Hirofumi Sasaki

First press regular edition exclusive
No.	Title	Lyrics	Music	Length
1.	"Virtual Butterfly" (Hey! Say! 7)	JUNO	Maria Marcus, Tommy Clint, Kenichi Sakamuro
2.	"Sunda DANCE" (スンダDance; Hey! Say! BEST)	m.piece	Kazumi Mitome

Regular edition exclusive
No.	Title	Lyrics	Music	Length
1.	"YOU & I"	KOUDAI IWATSUBO	KOUDAI IWATSUBO, ulala
