= Hey! Say! 2010 Ten JUMP =

Hey! Say! 2010 TEN JUMP

Video by Hey! Say! JUMP
- Released: September 15, 2010
- Recorded: May 16, 2010 at Kyocera Dome
- Genre: J-pop
- Length: 2 hours and 56 minutes
- Language: Japanese
- Label: J Storm Johnny & Associates
- Producer: Johnny H. Kitagawa (Executive producer); Julie K.

Hey! Say! JUMP chronology
| Hey! Say! JUMP-ing Tour '08-'09 (2009) | Hey! Say! 2010 TEN JUMP (2010) | Summary 2010 (2011) |

Hey! Say! 2010 TEN JUMP (stylized as Hey! Say! 2010 TEN JUMP) is the third live DVD release by Hey! Say! JUMP. It was released on September 15, 2009, on the J Storm label.

== Information ==
The two-disc DVD concert was the third live DVD concert of Hey! Say! JUMP. The DVD features the live concert, backstage and rehearsal footage all rolled into one. The first press release contains a 44-page booklet. It peaked at number one on the Oricon chart.

== Track listing ==
=== Disc 1 ===
1. "Dreams Come True"
2. "Tobira no Muko" (トビラの向こう)
3. "Bōken Rider" (冒険ライダー)
4. "Hitomi no Screen" (瞳のスクリーン)
5. "Endless Dream"
6. "S.O.S"
7. "Kagayaki Days" (輝きデイズ)
8. "School Days" (スクールデイズ)
9. "Score"
10. "Mayonaka no Shadow Boy" (真夜中のシャドーボーイ)
11. "Star Time"
12. "School Kakumei" (スクール革命)
13. "Taiyou ni Love Motion!" (太陽にLOVE MOTION!)
14. "FLY"
15. "Romeo & Juliet"
16. "Kumo no Ito" (蜘蛛の糸)
17. "Oto" (おと)
18. "NYC"
19. "Dial Up"
20. "Yume no Tane" (ゆめのタネ)
21. "Yūki 100%" (勇気100%)

=== Disc 2 ===
1. "Ganbaretsugo!" (ガンバレッツゴー！)
2. "Su.Ri.Ru" (ス・リ・ル)
3. "Ultra Music Power"
4. "Hey! Say!"
5. "Jounetsu JUMP" (情熱JUMP)
6. "To the Top"
7. "Your Seed"
8. "Born in the Earth"
9. "Our Future"
10. "Yume Iru" (夢色)
11. "Romeo & Juliet"

=== Bonus features ===
1. Hey! Say! 2010 Ten JUMP Documentary

== Charts and sales ==
=== Charts ===
| Chart | Peak position |
|---|---|
| Japan Oricon Weekly DVD Chart | 1 |

=== Sales and certifications ===
| Country | Provider | Sales | Certification |
|---|---|---|---|
| Japan | RIAJ | 106,492 | Gold |
