= Itadaki High JUMP =

- Directed by: Masuda Hikida
- Presented by: Hey! Say! JUMP
- Narrated by: Jun Hattori
- Country of origin: Japan
- Original language: Japanese
- No. of episodes: 95 (list of episodes)

Production
- Producers: Tetsuhei Miyazaki, Toshihisa Nakamura, Kyōko Okamura, Jun Miura (EP)
- Running time: 30 minutes

Original release
- Network: Fuji TV
- Release: July 8, 2015 – present

Itadaki High JUMP (いただきハイジャンプ, Itadaki Hai Janpu) is a Japanese variety show featuring Johnny & Associates' 8 members idol group Hey! Say! JUMP.

== About ==
Itadaki High JUMP, sometimes abbreviated as Itajump (いたジャン, Itajan), is the all-male idol group Hey! Say! JUMP's first regular one-man show. The show airs every Wednesday night on Fuji TV It initially appeared as a two-episodes special variety program that first aired on December 29, 2014, before being announced to be a regular show on June 11, 2015.^{SP#2} The concept of the show is to solve "serious problems" requested by viewers to the members of Hey! Say! JUMP.^{SP#2} In the show, the selected members come to a certain location without being told what they're going to do beforehand. In the studio, all the members watch a VTR of them solving the problem at the location.

Besides regular 'problem solving' episodes, there are several segment series in the show: eat gigantic portion of food and guess its calorie in Haikaropa Dekamori (ハイカロパデカ盛り), helping children overcome their weakness without them realize, attempting to beat a champion or pro by violating the rules/cheating, solving several problems at the studio, proving whether a rumor is true or false in Mayutsuba (マユツバ), and deciding the show's next emcee by guessing which Johnnies talent is in the card in the game Koredore Donpishana (コレダレ・ドンピシャーナ). Some episodes are simply a recap episode.

On December 30, 2015, the show received another one-hour special episode and was broadcast nationwide for the first time.^{SP#3}

On July 23, 2016, Itadaki High JUMP collaborated with Kis-My-Ft2's program that airs on the same channel, Kisumai BUSAIKU!?. The show was broadcast live.

Starting October 2017, the show's timeslot was moved to Saturday at 2PM.^{EP91}

On March 4, 2024, it was announced that the show would end its run by the end of the month, due to the network's spring schedule reorganization.

== Episode list ==
Episodes with no members listed means footage/review episode.

No.	Original air date	Member(s) involved	Mission	Extra
2014
Special #1	December 29	All members	Challenge from KanJani8's Tadayoshi Okura: Explosive Power - Run 50m immediately after being woken up	
Special #1	December 29	All members	Challenge from Kayoko Okubo: Sweaty idol appeal - Work together to beat the 5 km world record of running 5 km through treadmill	
2015
Special #2	June 11	Chinen, Takaki, & Yaotome	The members try to help a child get over their aversion to paprika in a dream world	
Special #2	June 11	Inoo, Okamoto, Yabu, & Yamada	Revamping a local superhero show	
1	July 8	Inoo & Yamada	Yamada acts as a father for a day for a girl who grew up without one while Inoo gives advice	
2	July 15	Arioka & Nakajima	Finding places you can see Mt. Fuji from in Tokyo	
3	July 22	Chinen, Takaki, & Yaotome	The members try to help a child get over their aversion to the family dogs in a dream world	
4	July 29	Arioka, Yabu, & Yamada	Replicating a traditional dish for a homesick Angolan using Japanese ingredients	
5	August 5	Chinen, Inoo, Takaki, & Yaotome	Helping Utsunomiya Zoo practice for an escaped animal crisis	
6	August 12	Chinen, Inoo, Takaki, & Yaotome	Helping Utsunomiya Zoo practice for an escaped animal crisis	
7	August 19	Chinen & Okamoto (Yabu)	Chinen and Okamoto think they're trying to discover a new species of ant, but really Yabu is sending the pair to haunted spots and having a medium check the response	
8	September 2	Yabu & Yamada	Yamada chooses the scariest suspension bridge in Shizuoka	
9	September 9	Arioka, Nakajima, & Okamoto	Trying to eat exactly the amount of food to break even on a buffet price	
10	September 16	Inoo, Okamoto, & Takaki	Designing welcome boards	
11	October 15	All members	Bowling perfect score challenge	
12	October 21	Inoo, Takaki, & Yabu	The members try to help a child get over their aversion to Bitter melon in a dream world	"Kimi Attraction" live studio
13	November 4	Arioka, Chinen, Yamada, & Yaotome	Haikaropa Dekamori: Eating a giant portion of food to try to find the best calorie to price ratio	
14	November 11	Arioka, Chinen, Yamada, & Yaotome	Haikaropa Dekamori: Eating a giant portion of food to try to find the best calorie to price ratio	
15	November 18	Arioka, Nakajima, & Takaki	Looking for the biggest dog in Tokyo	
16	November 25	All members	Solving issues in studio	
17	December 12	All members	Solving issues in studio	
18	December 9	Takaki & Yabu	Riding a bicycle uphill challenge	
19	December 16	All members	JUMP share things that secretly bugged them about one another	
Special #3 (20)	December 30	Yamada & Yabu	Yamada finds the scariest suspension bridge in Yamagata	Guest Tomoya Nagase
Special #3 (20)	December 30	Arioka, Inoo, & Yaotome	The guys think they're supposed to come up with a creative new recipe for Gyutan, but discover Nagase actually wanted a basic one	Guest Tomoya Nagase
2016
21	January 13	Takaki & Yamada	Catching deep sea fish to see if they'd be suitable for sushi	
22	January 20	Inoo, Nakajima, & Yaotome	Designing welcome boards	
23	January 27	Okamoto, Yabu, & Yaotome	The members try to help a child get over their aversion to paprika in a dream world	
24	February 3	Okamoto, Takaki, & Yaotome	The trio think they're doing an exercise special but really they're testing the limits of muscle pain	
25	February 10	Arioka & Chinen	Looking for the biggest dog in Chiba	
26	February 17	Inoo, Nakajima, & Yamada	The scariest thrill ride - Nagashima Spa Land vs Fuji-Q Highland	
27	February 24	Inoo, Nakajima, & Yamada	The scariest thrill ride - Nagashima Spa Land vs Fuji-Q Highland	
28	March 3	Arioka, Takaki, & Yaotome	Finding out which food warms the body best while eating in a room at -10 Celsius	
29	March 9	Okamoto, Yabu, & Yaotome	The members try to help a child get over their aversion to cats & bananas in a dream world	
30	March 16	Chinen, Inoo, & Yamada	The members try various methods of cheating to beat Reversi & Billiards world champions	"Sayonara Sensation" live studio
31	April 13	Arioka, Takaki, & Yaotome	Haikaropa Dekamori (Spring edition)	
32	April 20	Okamoto, Takaki, & Yamada	Helping out at Sumida Aquarium	
33	April 27	Chinen, Nakajima, & Okamoto	The members try to help a child get over their aversion to Tomatoes in a dream world	
34	May 4	Takaki, Yabu, & Yamada	The members try various methods of cheating to beat quiz & Shogi masters	
35	May 11	Arioka, Chinen, & Yamada	Investigating different spots viewers have heard mysterious stories about	"Maji Sunshine" live studio
36	May 18	Inoo, Nakajima, Yabu, & Yaotome	Guess the price of celebrity lunches	
Special #4 (37)	May 25	Arioka, Nakajima, & Yabu	Helping a child learn to ride a bicycle by pretending to be a fairy from another world	
Special #4 (37)	May 25	Okamoto, Takaki, & Yaotome	Helping a child get over their fear of being home alone by pretending to be a fairy from another world	
38	June 1	Chinen, Nakajima, & Okamoto	The members try to help a bicultural child get over their aversion to steak in a dream world	
39	June 8	Arioka, Nakajima, Yaotome, & Yamada	Trying to find ways to make wedding traditions more exciting	
40	June 15	Chinen & Arioka	Looking for the biggest dog in Kanagawa	
41	June 22	Takaki, Yabu, & Yamada	The members try various methods of cheating to beat Karuta & Street Fighter champions	
42	June 29	Chinen, Inoo, Nakajima, & Yamada	Haikaropa Dekamori (Summer Edition)	Special appearance of Yuma Nakayama
43	July 6	Chinen, Inoo, Nakajima, & Yamada	Haikaropa Dekamori (Summer Edition)	Special appearance of Yuma Nakayama
44	July 13	Chinen, Inoo, Yaotome	Helping a child learn to jump rope by pretending to be a fairy from another world	HOPE reenactment (Takaki)
45	July 20	All members	Guessing the price of celebrity lunches	HOPE reenactment (Yamada)
Special #5	July 24	All members	Itadaki High Jump and Kisumai BUSAIKU!? collaboration special	
46	July 27	FNS 27hr TV opening act		HOPE reenactment (Inoo)
46	July 27	Takaki, Yabu, & Yamada	The members try various methods of cheating to beat a Puyo Puyo Tetris champion	HOPE reenactment (Inoo)
47	August 3	Arioka, Chinen, & Yaotome	The members try various methods of cheating to beat Typing & Goldfish scooping champions	HOPE reenactment (Arioka)
48	August 10	Arioka, Inoo, & Takaki	The members try to help a child get over their aversion to Tomatoes in a dream world	HOPE reenactment (Chinen)
49	August 17	Arioka, Yabu, & Yaotome	Yaotome faces his extreme cat hatred to decide the best cat	
Summer Vacation Special	August 20	Review of past episodes related to children		
50	August 24	Takaki, Yabu, & Yaotome	Helping a child learn to flip over the horizontal bar by pretending to be a fairy from another world	HOPE reenactment (Okamoto)
51	August 31	Arioka, Inoo, & Takaki	The members try to help a child get over their aversion to eggplant in a dream world	HOPE reenactment (Yaotome)
52	September 7	All members	Solving issues in studio	HOPE reenactment (Yabu)
53	September 14	All members	Solving issues in studio	Message from Nakajima about HOPE
54	October 12	Arioka, Yaotome, & Yabu	Helping a child learn to jump over a vaulting box by pretending to be a fairy from another world	Cain to Abel reenactment (Chinen)
55	October 19	Takaki, Yabu, & Yamada	The members try various methods of cheating to beat Darts & Gomoku champions	Cain to Abel reenactment (Takaki)
56	October 26	Arioka, Takaki, & Yaotome	Bus tour of unique food with "Mizuki Yamamoto" as guide	Cain to Abel reenactment (Arioka) & "Fantastic Time" live studio
57	November 2	Inoo, Okamoto, & Yaotome	Mayutsuba: Testing various myths surrounding carbonated drink, meat past its expiration, & baseball results	Cain to Abel reenactment (Nakajima)
58	November 9	Arioka, Chinen, Inoo, & Nakajima	Finding exciting ways to take selfies to get the most likes	Cain to Abel reenactment (Inoo)
59	November 16	Arioka, Chinen, Inoo, & Nakajima	Finding exciting ways to take selfies to get the most likes	Cain to Abel reenactment (Okamoto)
60	November 23	Chinen, Nakajima, & Yabu	Helping a child learn to ride a bicycle by pretending to be a fairy from another world	Cain to Abel reenactment (Yaotome)
61	November 30	Takaki, Yabu, & Yamada	The members try various methods of cheating to beat parking & calculator champions	Cain to Abel reenactment (Yabu)
62	December 7	All members	The members try various methods of cheating to beat soccer dribbling & Tug of War champions	Cain to Abel reenactment (Nakajima)
63	December 14	Chinen, Inoo, & Yamada	Yamada faces his fear of natto, frogs, & haunted houses to try to win the chance to join a segment that helps children	Message from Yamada about Cain to Abel
-	December 24	Preview of Special episode		
Special #6 (64)	December 29	Arioka & Takaki	Climbing Mount Hua in China to pray for the success of a girl's love confession	Guest Hiromi & Airi Taira
Special #6 (64)	December 29	Inoo, Nakajima, & Yamada	Helping a child learn to ride a bicycle by pretending to be a fairy from another world	Guest Hiromi & Airi Taira
2017
65	January 11	Unaired footage from the Mount Hua climb episode^{SP#6}		
66	January 18	Arioka, Nakajima, & Takaki	Helping a child learn to jump rope by pretending to be a fairy from another world	
67	January 25	Arioka, Nakajima & Yaotome	Mayutsuba: Testing various myths surrounding smelly shoes, superhuman strength, hypnotism, & hot foods	
68	February 1	Chinen, Nakajima, Takaki, & Yaotome	Haikaropa Dekamori (Valentine edition)	
69	February 8	Chinen, Nakajima, Takaki, & Yaotome	Haikaropa Dekamori (Valentine edition)	
70	February 15	Arioka, Takaki, & Yamada	Trying a luxurious hotel, limo, & food with only 1000 yen to spend	"OVER THE TOP" live studio
71	February 22	Arioka, Chinen, & Yaotome	Helping a child learn to flip over a horizontal bar by pretending to be a fairy from another world	
72	March 1	Arioka & Okamoto	Solving problems over the phone	
73	March 8	All members	A battle for Yamada's home cooked meal - who has done the best in Itadaki High Jump	
74	March 15	Arioka, Inoo, & Nakajima	Guessing the 'omakase' course in Sushi shop	
75	April 12	All members	Koredore Donpishana: A game where the members ask questions of each other in order to receive hints to guess the identity of the Johnny's member on the card they selected	
76	April 26	All members	Koredore Donpishana: A game where the members ask questions of each other in order to receive hints to guess the identity of the Johnny's member on the card they selected	
77	May 3	All members	Koredore Donpishana: A game where the members ask questions of each other in order to receive hints to guess the identity of the Johnny's member on the card they selected	
78	May 10	Chinen, Nakajima, & Yamada	Helping a girl cook for her father to show her gratitude and ask him to trust her to live on her own	
79	May 17	Inoo, Yabu, & Yaotome	Helping a child learn to ride a bicycle by pretending to be a fairy from another world	
80	May 24	Okamoto	Finding the fastest playground slide in Japan	
81	May 31	Okamoto	Finding the fastest playground slide in Japan	
82	June 7	Arioka, Nakajima, & Okamoto	The members try various methods of cheating to beat Drone & Bowling champions	
83	June 14	All members	Koredore Donpishana: A game where the members ask questions of each other in order to receive hints to guess the identity of the Johnny's member on the card they selected	
84	June 21	All members	Koredore Donpishana: A game where the members ask questions of each other in order to receive hints to guess the identity of the Johnny's member on the card they selected	
85	June 28	All members	Koredore Donpishana: A game where the members ask questions of each other in order to receive hints to guess the identity of the Johnny's member on the card they selected	
86	July 5	Takaki, Yabu, & Yamada	The members try to support an aspiring K-1 champion on his journey to becoming number one	"Precious Girl" live studio
87	July 19	All members	Solving issues in studio	
88	July 26	All members	Solving issues in studio	
89	August 2	All members	Koredore Donpishana: A game where the members ask questions of each other in order to receive hints to guess the identity of the Johnny's member on the card they selected	
90	August 9	All members	Koredore Donpishana: A game where the members ask questions of each other in order to receive hints to guess the identity of the Johnny's member on the card they selected	
91	August 16	Yamada & Takaki	Takaki spends the day trying to help a boy learn to do a basketball layup while Yamada gives advice	Announcement about Itadaki High Jump's new timeslot
92	August 23	Okamoto & Takaki	Finding the fastest waterslide in Japan	
93	August 30	Chinen & Nakajima	Nakajima spends the day trying to help a boy learn to play catch while Chinen gives advice	
Special #7	September 9	Review of past episodes in regards of Itadaki High Jump timeslot change		
94	September 6	Arioka, Nakajima, & Takaki	The members try to support an aspiring Rakugo storyteller on his journey to becoming a principal storyteller	
95	September 13	Members and issues on them during problem solving		
96	October 7	Arioka & Nakajima	Helping the bride's parents express their feelings by creating a video for the bride at the wedding reception	
97	October 14	Chinen & Yamada	Helping a child overcome their fear of going to toilet alone by pretending to be an Invisible Friend	
98	October 21	Yabu & Yaotome	Yabu spends the day trying to teach a young boy how to do a soccer juggling trick while Yaotome gives advice	
99	October 28	Nakajima & Okamoto	Finding the fastest natural waterslide in Japan	
100	November 11	Arioka, Nakajima, Okamoto, Takaki, & Yabu	Finding the fastest place to sled in Japan	1 hour special in regards of their debut single 10th anniversary
100	November 11	Chinen, Inoo, Yamada, & Yaotome	Helping the bride's parents express their feelings by creating a video for the bride at the wedding reception	1 hour special in regards of their debut single 10th anniversary
101	November 18	Yabu, Chinen & Arioka	Helping a child fan of Neon Genesis Evangelion learn to ride a bicycle by pretending to be a fairy from another world	
102	November 25	Inoo & Yaotome	Helping a child overcome their aversion to drinking milk by pretending to be an Invisible Friend	
103	December 2	Chinen & Nakajima	Helping a child learn to jump rope by pretending to be a fairy from another world	
104	December 16	Arioka & Takaki	The pair apprentice themselves to comedian Takashi Tanaka to learn about moss	
105	December 23	Takaki, Yaotome, & Inoo	Helping a child learn to flip over a horizontal bar by pretending to be a fairy from another world	
2018
106	January 1	Arioka, Yaotome, & Takaki	Finding a Blue Grotto of Capri lookalike in Shizuoka	1 hour special
106	January 1	Nakajima, Chinen, Okamoto, & Yabu	Finding a Uyuni Salt flats lookalike in Tottori	1 hour special
106	January 1	Yamada	Making a welcome home meal for JUMP	1 hour special
107	January 20	All members	Problems the members had filming the New Year's SP & behind the scenes of Yamada's cooking. Also: In the studio, the members discuss problems they've had	
108	January 27	Yamada, Inoo & Yabu	Haikaropa Dekamori in Chofu, Tokyo	
109	February 3	Nakajima & Yaotome	Helping a child learn to ride a bicycle by pretending to be a fairy from another world	
110	February 10	Yamada, Chinen, & Inoo	Getting recipes from local farmers	"Mae wo Muke" live studio
111	February 17	Nakajima & Okamoto	The pair apprentice themselves to comedian Mizuki Nishimura to learn about winter camping	
112	February 24	Takaki, Arioka, & Nakajima	Promoting Hinoharamura by asking shops to make special JUMP discount coupons	
113	March 3	Takaki, Arioka, & Nakajima	Promoting Hinoharamura by asking shops to make special JUMP discount coupons	
114	March 10	All members	Solving issues in studio	
115	March 17	All members	Solving issues in studio	
116	March 24	Arioka, Chinen	Apprenticing for a day at a moving company to find the cheapest way to move	
117	April 14	Nakajima, Arioka	Helping out at a yakitori restaurant	Studio Challenge: Yamada & Yaotome
118	April 21	Nakajima, Arioka	Helping out at a yakitori restaurant	Studio Challenge: Arioka
119	April 28	Chinen, Yaotome	Training with a 73-year-old woman whose dream is to skydive. Yaotome and Chinen compete in various challenges to determine who will jump out of the plane	Studio Challenge: Yabu & Yaotome
120	May 5	Chinen, Yaotome	Training with a 73-year-old woman whose dream is to skydive. Yaotome and Chinen compete in various challenges to determine who will jump out of the plane	Studio Challenge: Yaotome & JUMP
121	May 12	Arioka, Takaki	Searching for a way to revive the traditional art of kokeshi dolls	Studio Challenge: Okamoto
122	May 19	Arioka, Takaki	Searching for a way to revive the traditional art of kokeshi dolls	Studio Challenge: Takaki
123	May 26	Okamoto, Yamada	Helping out at a 100-year-old tofu shop	Studio Challenge: Nakajima
124	June 2	Okamoto, Yamada	Helping out at a 100-year-old tofu shop	Studio Challenge: Nakajima, Yamada, Takaki
125	June 9	Nakajima, Yabu	Helping restore a model railway to working condition	Studio Challenge: Chinen
126	June 16	Nakajima, Yabu	Helping restore a model railway to working condition	Studio Challenge: Takaki
127	June 23	Okamoto, Arioka, Yamada	Learning to make yakiniku more delicious	Studio Challenge: Inoo
128	June 30	Yamada, Inoo	Onsen and gourmet tour	Studio Challenge: JUMP
129	July 7	Yamada, Inoo	Onsen and gourmet tour	Studio Challenge: Arioka (from fellow Code Blue actors)
130	July 14	Arioka, Chinen, Takaki	Morning fishing	Studio Challenge: Arioka (from fellow Code Blue actors)
131	July 21	JUMP	Special summer camping event	Studio Challenge: Arioka (from fellow Code Blue actors)
132	July 28	JUMP	Special summer camping event	Studio Challenge: Arioka (from fellow Code Blue actors) Cosmic★Human message
133	August 4	Yamada, Arioka, Inoo	Playing Cosmic★Human using everyday items as instruments	Studio Challenge: Yabu
134	August 11	Nakajima	Nakajima trains and plays with DRUM TAO	Studio Challenge: Nakajima, Arioka
135	August 18	Yabu, Okamoto, Takaki	Eating gourmet burgers in Kitasenju	Studio Challenge: Yamada
136	August 25	Arioka, Takaki, Yaotome	A cycling trip to find the freshest things In studio: JUMP air concerns they have	Okamoto's last appearance
137	September 1	Arioka, Takaki, Yaotome	A cycling trip to find the freshest things In studio: JUMP air concerns they have	Studio Challenge: Yamada
138	September 8	Yamada, Yaotome	Solving gourmet mysteries	Studio Challenge: Yabu
139	September 15	Takaki, Arioka	Go-karting	Studio Challenge: Yabu
140	September 22	Arioka, Yabu, Chinen	Eating from 100 yen menus	Studio Challenge: Arioka
141	September 29	Inoo, Chinen	Bicycle & gourmet tour in Choshi city	Studio Challenge: Takaki
142	October 6	Inoo, Chinen	Bicycle & gourmet tour in Choshi city	Studio Challenge: SUITS

== Citation ==
- "EP" and "SP#" is shortened form for episode and refers to an episode number of the variety show Itadaki High Jump.
