= Smart (Hey! Say! JUMP album) =

S3ART

Studio album by Hey! Say! JUMP
- Released: June 18, 2014 (Japan)
- Recorded: 2014
- Genre: J-pop
- Labels: J Storm, Johnny & Associates

Hey! Say! JUMP chronology
JUMP World (2012)	S3ART (2014)	JUMPing CAR (2015)

Smart (stylized as S3ART) is the third studio album from Hey! Say! JUMP. It was released on June 18, 2014. After almost two years since Hey! Say! JUMP's second album JUMP World was released, it was announced that the group would release their third album on June 18, 2014. The album contains the singles: "Come On A My House", "Ride With Me", and "AinoArika". Three different versions of the album were released: a Regular Edition, Limited Edition 1 and 2. In addition, Hey! Say! JUMP held a live tour shortly after the album's release. It kicked off on August 2 at Osaka-jo Hall and wrapped up with a 3-day live at Yokohama Arena in October. Additionally, the second track from the 12th single, "Aisureba Motto Happy Life", will not be included in this album.

== Regular Edition ==
1. "Overture" (tentative)
2. "FOREVER"
3. "Ready Go"
4. "Come On A My House"
5. "Setsunasa, Hikikae ni (切なさ、ひきかえに )"
6. "Candle"
7. "Pastel (パステル)"
8. "Yuto Tataite Mita. (ゆーと叩いてみた。)"
9. "Compass Rose (コンパスローズ )"
10. "Ride With Me"
11. "Come Back...?"
12. "RELOAD"
13. "Hajimari no Melody (はじまりのメロディ)"
14. "AinoArika"

== Regular Edition First Press ==
CD

1. "My World" - Hey! Say! JUMP
2. "Tomodachi Dayo (ともだちだよ)" - Hey! Say! JUMP
3. "Yes!" - Kaitou y-ELLOW-voice (Yuya Takaki, Hikaru Yaotome, Ryosuke Yamada)
4. "Super Super Night" - Night Style People (Kota Yabu, Yuto Nakajima, Yuri Chinen)
5. "Oh! Idol! (Oh!アイドル!)" - Aioitai (Kei Inoo, Daiki Arioka, Keito Okamoto)

== Limited Edition 1 DVD ==
Album S3ART song explanation interview & recording footage

== Limited Edition 2 DVD ==
1. "FOREVER" (Music Video)
2. "Setsunasa, Hikikae ni" (Music Video)
