= Dear (Hey! Say! JUMP album) =

DEAR

Studio album by Hey! Say! JUMP
- Released: July 27, 2016 (Japan)
- Recorded: 2016
- Genre: J-pop
- Labels: J Storm, Johnny & Associates

Hey! Say! JUMP chronology
JUMPing CAR (2014)	DEAR (2016)	Hey! Say! JUMP 2007-2017 I/O (2017)

DEAR was released a year and a month after the release of JUMPing CAR. It's Hey! Say! JUMP's fifth original album. The album consists of 16 songs including their single "Kimi Attraction", "Eternal", which was the CM song for Kose Cosmeport's Clear Turn, and "Ai no Syubidova", which was used in the CM for Bourbon's Caramel Popcorn series. The Limited Edition 1 DVD contains the PV and making-of footage for "Masquerade", while Limited Edition 2 comes with another CD including 4 unit songs. Furthermore, the Regular Edition comes with a bonus song called "From".

== Regular Edition ==
1. "Invitation" (Instrumental)
2. "Masquerade"
3. "RUN de Boo!"
4. "Dream Master"
5. "B.A.B.Y."
6. "Kimi Attraction"
7. "Special Love"
8. "DEAR"
9. "Eternal"
10. "SUPERMAN"
11. "Order"
12. "Tasty U"
13. "Slow Motion"
14. "Ai no Syubidova"
15. "KISS Diary"
16. "Brand New World"

*Regular Edition includes bonus song "From".

== Limited Edition 1 DVD ==
1. "Masquerade" (PV & Making)

== Limited Edition 2 CD ==
1. "Mr.Flawless" - Kota Yabu, Yuya Takaki, Yuto Nakajima
2. "Konya Anata wo Kudokimasu" - Kei Inoo, Hikaru Yaotome
3. "Boku to Keito" - Keito Okamoto, Yuri Chinen
4. "My Girl" - Daiki Arioka, Ryosuke Yamada
