= JUMP No. 1 =

JUMP No.1

Studio album by Hey! Say! JUMP
- Released: July 7, 2010 (Japan)
- Recorded: 2010
- Genre: J-pop
- Length: 1:06:39
- Label: J Storm Johnny & Associates
- Producer: Johnny H. Kitagawa (executive)

Hey! Say! JUMP chronology
JUMP No.1 (2010)	JUMP World (2012)

Singles from JUMP No.1
- 1. "Ultra Music Power" Released: November 14, 2007; 2. "Dreams Come True" Released: May 21, 2008; 3. "Your Seed/Bōken Rider" Released: July 23, 2008; 4. "Mayonaka no Shadow Boy" Released: October 22, 2008; 5. "Hitomi no Screen" Released: February 24, 2010

JUMP No. 1 is the first studio album by Hey! Say! JUMP, released on July 7, 2010, under the label J Storm.

== Information ==
JUMP No. 1 was released in both limited-edition version and a regular edition. The limited edition included a 40-page premium booklet while the Regular Edition included 28-page special booklet. The album contains 17 songs including their previous 5 singles. However, the second track "Boken Rider" from the third single will not be included in this album.

Hikaru Yaotome both composed and wrote the song titled "Ai☆Sukuriimu" (アイ☆スクリーム; I☆Scream). Kota Yabu, Yuya Takaki, Ryosuke Yamada, Yuto Nakajima, and Yuri Chinen participated in writing lyrics for the new songs. Daiki Arioka arranged one of the songs that Yuya Takaki wrote: "Time". Kei Inoo and Keito Okamoto participated in the studio session for the new songs as musical performers. The lyrics for the song titled "Thank you (Bokutachi kara kimi e)" (Thank You ～僕たちから君へ～, lit. "Thank you: From us to you") were written by Hey! Say! JUMP.

== Regular Edition ==
CD

1. "DREAMER"
2. "INFINITY"
3. "Ultra Music Power"
4. "Thank You (Bokutachi Kara Kimi e)"
- 28-page special booklet

== Limited Edition ==
CD

1. "DREAMER"
2. "INFINITY"
3. "Hitomi no Screen"
4. "Shinku"
5. "Ganbarettsugo!" - Hey! Say! 7
6. "Jounetsu JUMP"
7. "Smile Song"
8. "Memories"
9. "Dreams Come True"
10. "Time"
11. "Score" - Hey! Say! BEST
12. "Your Seed"
13. "I☆Scream"
14. "Mayonaka no Shadow Boy"
15. "Dash!!"
16. "Ultra Music Power"
17. "Thank You (Bokutachi Kara Kimi e)"
- 40-page premium booklet

== Charts and certifications ==
=== Charts ===
Chart (2010)	Peak position
Japan Oricon Weekly Album Chart	1
Japan Oricon Yearly Album Chart	33

=== Sales and certifications ===
Country	Provider	Sales	Certification
Japan	RIAJ	187,621	Gold

== Release ==
Country	Date	Format	Label
Japan	July 7, 2010	CDJACA-5231; LEJACA-5230	J Storm
Hong Kong	August 5, 2010	CD; LE	Avex Asia Limited
