= JUMPing Car =

JUMPing CAR

Studio album by Hey! Say! JUMP
- Released: June 24, 2015 (Japan)
- Recorded: 2015
- Genre: J-pop
- Label: J Storm, Johnny & Associates

Hey! Say! JUMP chronology
S3ART (2014)	JUMPing CAR (2015)	DEAR (2016)

JUMPing CAR is the fourth album released by Hey! Say! JUMP. Through this album, the members want to tell their fans, "During fun times and sad times, get on the JUMPing CAR and move forward with us!" The album includes 15 songs including their singles: "Weekender/Asu e no YELL" and "Chau#/我 I Need You" but "Wo I Need You" not includes in this album. The album was released in 3 different versions: Limited Edition 1, Limited Edition 2, and Regular Edition. Limited Edition 1 includes the Hey! Say! JUMP version of the mysterious unit Sensations and their song "Koro Sensations", which was the theme song to Ryosuke Yamada's starring movie Assassination Classroom. Meanwhile, Limited Edition 2 contains 3 unit songs, and Regular Edition contains 2 brand new songs.

== Regular Edition ==
1. "Fantasist" (Instrumental)
2. "JUMPing CAR"
3. "Walk"
4. "SHen SHera SHen"
5. "Weekender"
6. "Kira Kira Hikare"
7. "Ai yo, Boku wo Michibiite Yuk"
8. "Fever"
9. "Boys Don't Stop"
10. "Dangerous"
11. "Chau#"
12. "Yowamushi★Shooter"
13. "Asu e no YELL"
14. "Farewell"
15. "Very Very Happy"

== Limited Edition 1 ==
1. "Koro Sensations (Hey! Say! JUMP ver.)" - Sensations
2. "DISCO JOCKEY!!!"

== Limited Edition 2 ==
1. "Pet Shop Love Motion" - Yuya Takaki, Kei Inoo, Yuto Nakajima, Yuri Chinen
2. "UNION" - Kota Yabu, Hikaru Yaotome, Daiki Arioka
3. "3-gatsu 14-nichi (Tokei)" - Keito Okamoto, Ryosuke Yamada
