= Scrap Teacher =

- Genre: School Drama
- Starring: Yuto Nakajima; Ryosuke Yamada; Yuri Chinen; Daiki Arioka
- Ending theme: "Mayonaka no Shadow Boy" by Hey! Say! JUMP
- Country of origin: Japan
- Original language: Japanese
- No. of episodes: 9

Production
- Producers: Yuko Hazeyama, Masahiro Uchiyama
- Running time: 9:00-9:54 p.m

Original release
- Network: NTV
- Release: October 11 – December 6, 2008

Scrap Teacher: Kyōshi Saisei (スクラップ･ティーチャー〜教師再生〜) is a Japanese school comedy/drama series aired on NTV at 21:00-21:54 every Saturday from October 11 to December 6, 2008. It consisted of nine episodes. Scrap Teacher was produced by Yuko Hazeyama and Masahiro Uchiyama from a screenplay by Fumie Mizuhashi. Its theme song was "Mayonaka no Shadow Boy" by Hey! Say! JUMP.

== Synopsis ==
Shuzaburo Kusaka (Yuto Nakajima) is a junior high student attending a school which is due to close. He tries to learn despite the inept teachers and rowdy students. Toranosuke Sugi (Kamiji Yusuke), his homeroom teacher, is new and idealistic, unlike the other teachers. One day, Kusaka meets three boys, new students at the school: Tōichi Takasugi (Ryosuke Yamada), Eitarō Yoshida (Yuri Chinen), and Sugizō Irie (Daiki Arioka). They transfer to his class and work to change the ethos of the school.

== Cast ==
=== Class 2-B ===
- Yuto Nakajima as Shuzaburo Kusaka
- Ryosuke Yamada as Tōichi Takasugi
- Yuri Chinen as Eitarō Yoshida
- Daiki Arioka as Sugizō Irie
- Misaki Takahata as Misaki Sawatari
- Fuma Kikuchi as Fuma Kusumoto
- Kento Nakajima as Kento Minobe
- Sairi Ito as Sairi Osaki
- Asami Tanaka as Manami Shinagawa
- Mariya Nishiuchi as Mariya Ueno

=== Teachers ===
- Yusuke Kamiji as Toranosuke Sugi
- Ai Kato as Yuko Taki
- Osamu Mukai as Satoshi Matsuo
- Norito Yashima as Hisakimi Takasu
- Yoko Minamino as Akimi Gōtokuji
- Takeshi Masu as Shosuke Enokido
- Kōji Nakamoto as Jon Sakita
- Seiji Rokkaku as Hajime Yabuki
