= Hey! Say! JUMP-ing Tour '08–'09 =

Hey! Say! JUMP-ing Tour '08-'09

Video by Hey! Say! JUMP
- Released: April 29, 2009
- Recorded: January 05, 2009 at Yokohama Arena
- Genre: Japanese Pop
- Language: Japanese
- Label: J Storm Johnny & Associates

Hey! Say! JUMP chronology
Hey! Say! JUMP Debut & First Concert Ikinari! in Tokyo Dome (2008)	Hey! Say! JUMP-ing Tour '08-'09 (2009)	Hey! Say! 2010 Ten JUMP (2010)

Hey! Say! JUMP-ing Tour '08-'09 is the second DVD live concert released by Hey! Say! JUMP under the J Storm label. The DVD covers the last performance of the group in Yokohama Arena. The DVD was certified Gold by RIAJ.

== Information ==
The concert tour began from the end of 2008 till the early year of 2009. The concert toured a total of three cities in Japan. Osaka, Nagoya, and Yokohama, where the concert DVD was shot last January 5, 2009 and attracts 140,000 people. The concert covers a full show that showcases the number one singles of the group over the past year. The DVD features a total of 28 stage performances.

== Songs ==
1. "Overture"
2. "Ultra Music Power"
3. "Dreams Come True"
4. "Your Seed"
5. "FLY"
6. "Wonderland Train" (ワンダーランド・トレイン)
7. "Uruwashi no Bad Girl" (麗しのBad Girl)
8. "Moonlight"
9. "Kawaii Kimi no Koto Damono" (カワイイ君のことだもの)
10. "Deep Night Omou" (Deep night 君思う)
11. "Mayonaka no Shadow Boy" (真夜中のシャドーボーイ)
12. "School Kakumei" (スクール革命)
13. "Taiyo ni Love Motion!" (太陽にLOVE MOTION!)
14. "Star Time"
15. Honey Beat
16. "Hadashi no Mirai" (ハダシの未来)
17. "Su.Ri.Ru" (ス・リ・ル)
18. "Switch"
19. "Kumo no Ito" (蜘蛛の糸)
20. "Itoshi no Play Girl" (愛しのプレイガール)
21. "Summary Medley" (SUMMARYメドレー)
22. "Bouken Rider" (冒険ライダー)
23. "Hey! Say!"
24. "Memories"
25. "Yuuki 100%" (勇気100%)
26. "Tobira no Mukou" (トビラの向こう)
27. "Ultra Music Power"
28. "Dreams Come True"

== Release ==
Region	Date	Format	Label
Japan	April 29, 2009	DVD	J Storm
