= Cain and Abel (Japanese TV series) =

2016 Japanese drama series

- Genre: Romance
- Written by: Tatsuya Kanazawa
- Directed by: Takeuchi Hideki; Hayama Hiroki; Tanimura Masaki
- Starring: Ryosuke Yamada; Kiritani Kenta; Kurashina Kana; Takashima Masanobu
- Ending theme: "Give Me Love" by Hey! Say! JUMP
- Composer: Yugo Kanno
- Country of origin: Japan
- Original language: Japanese
- No. of episodes: 10

Production
- Producers: Hatori Kenichi; Ikeda Takuya; Nishisaka Mizuki
- Running time: 45 minutes Mondays at 21:00 (JST)
- Production company: Fuji Television

Original release
- Network: Fuji Television
- Release: October 17 – December 19, 2016

Related
- Sukinahito ga Iru Koto; Totsuzen Desu ga, Ashita Kekkon Shimasu

Cain to Abel (カインとアベル) (Cain and Abel) is a 2016 Japanese television drama, starring Ryosuke Yamada, Kiritani Kenta, Kurashina Kana and Takashima Masanobu. It aired every Monday at 21:00 (JST) on Fuji Television beginning October 17, 2016. This is also Ryosuke Yamada's first lead role in the Fuji TV 21:00 drama time slot.

== Cast ==
- Ryosuke Yamada as Takada Yu
- Kiritani Kenta as Takada Ryuichi
- Kurashina Kana as Yahagi Azusa
- Takashima Masanobu as Takada Takayuki
- Takenaka Naoto as Kurosawa Kosuke
- Otsuka Nene as Hirose Saki
- Minami Kaho as Takada Momoko
- Hira Mikijiro -> Terao Akira as Takada Soichiro
- Kinoshita Houka as Dan Mamoru
- Hino Yojin as Sasaki Hajime
- Yamazaki Hirona as Shibata Hikari
- Nishimura Motoki as Ando Mitsuru
- Tozuka Junki as Mizawa Yota

== Episodes ==
| Episode | Original air date | Episode title | Romanized title | English title | Director | Ratings (%) | Notes |
|---|---|---|---|---|---|---|---|
| 1 | October 17, 2016 | 僕とアニキの2つの三角関係 | Boku to Aniki no Futatsu no Sankaku Kankei | The 2 love triangles between my brother and I | Takeuchi Hideki | 8.8% | 15 minutes additional broadcast time |
| 2 | October 24, 2016 | ハートを掴め！！恋も仕事も驚きの大逆転 | Haato wo Tsukame!! Koi mo Shigoto mo Odoroki no Daigyakuten | Grasp the heart!! A shocking reversal in love and work | Hayama Hiroki | 8.6% | |
| 3 | October 31, 2016 | 超緊急事態！最大のピンチを乗り越えろ | Chou Kinkyuu Jitai! Saidai no Pinchi wo Norikoero | Emergency situation! Overcoming the biggest crisis | Tanimura Masaki | 6.9% | |
| 4 | November 7, 2016 | 奇跡の大逆転！運命を変えたひらめき！ | Kiseki no Daigyakuten! Unmei wo Kaeta Hirameki | Miraculous turn-around! Insight that changed the fate! | Takeuchi Hideki | 7.0% | |
| 5 | November 14, 2016 | 裏切り？策略？愛？引き裂かれる2人!! | Uragiri? Sakuryaku? Ai? Hikisakareru Futari!! | Betrayal? Tactics? Love? 2 people who are being torn apart!! | Hira Kouji | 7.6% | |
| 6 | November 21, 2016 | 嫉妬？欲望？転落？動き出す禁断の恋!! | Shitto? Yokubou? Tenraku? Udokidasu Kindan no Koi!! | Jealousy? Desire? Comedown? Forbidden love starts!! | Hayama Hiroki | 9.0% | |
| 7 | November 28, 2016 | 秘密！？激情！？策略！？迫り来る非常な運命 | Himitsu!? Gekijou!? Sakuryaku!? Semarikuru Hijouna Unmei | Secret!? Violent Emotions!? Tactics!? Extraordinary fate approaching | Tanimura Masaki | 8.8% | |
| 8 | December 5, 2016 | 忍びよる悪魔の誘い 一瞬で奪われる幸せ | Shinobiyoru Akuma no Sasoi Isshun de Ubawareru Shiawase | Devil's temptation creeping up Happiness snatched in a moment | Takeuchi Hideki | 8.4% | |
| 9 | December 12, 2016 | 衝撃！！裏切りの瞬間 追い詰められる家族 | Shougeki!! Uragiri no Shunkan Oitsumerareru Kazoku | Shock!! The moment of betrayal Family that is being driven to a corner | Hora Kouji | 7.9% | |
| 10 | December 19, 2016 | 恋に仕事に大波乱！！ 最後に起こる奇跡！！ | Koi ni Shigoto ni Daiharan!! Saigo ni Okoru Kiseki!! | Huge disturbance in love and work!! The miracle happening in the end!! | Takeuchi Hideki | 9.1% | |

== Remark ==
- Hira Mikijiro died suddenly on October 22, 2016, and his role as Takada Soichiro was taken over by Terao Akira from Episode 4.
- The opening theme song was composed by Dmitri Shostakovich - finale from his Symphony No. 5 (Shostakovich). However, credits to the composer were not given throughout the drama series.

| Preceded by Sukina Hito ga Iru Koto; July 11, 2016 – September 19, 2016 | Fuji TV Monday Dramas; Mondays 21:00 – 21:54 (JST) | Succeeded by Totsuzen Desu ga, Ashita Kekkon Shimasu; January 23, 2017 – March 2017 |
