= Water Polo Yankees =

Television series

- 水球ヤンキース; Suikyu Yankisu
- Genre: School Life, Sports, Drama
- Written by: Yuichi Tokunaga; Saya Matsuda
- Directed by: Miyaki Shogo; Shinada Shunsuk
- Starring: Yuto Nakajima; Kento Yamazaki; Sakurako Ohara; Yuya Takaki
- Ending theme: "Asu e no YELL" by Hey! Say! JUMP
- Composers: Yu Takami; Yutaka Yamada
- Country of origin: Japan
- Original language: Japanese
- No. of episodes: 10

Production
- Producer: Fujino Ryota
- Production location: Tokyo, Japan
- Running time: Saturday at 23:10-23:55 (JST)

Original release
- Network: Fuji TV
- Release: 12 July – 20 September 2014

Water Polo Yankees (水球ヤンキース, Suikyu Yankisu)^{[1]} is a 2014 Japanese television drama, starring Yuto Nakajima of Hey! Say! JUMP, Kento Yamazaki and Sakurako Ohara. It is the first drama to have water polo as their main sport. The drama aired from 12 July 2014 to 20 September 2014 with a total of ten episodes.

== Plot ==
Naoya Inaba, who spends the majority of his adolescence abroad, returns to his hometown for his third year of high school. He enrolls in Saku High, which he admires thanks to one of its graduates, Yoshio Kurosawa, a yankee (20th century Japanese delinquent) who saved him from bullies and who encouraged him to never give up in pursuit of his dreams. However, to his dismay, he finds out that Saku High is inhabited by low-lives who resign to being underdogs in the town, and the school itself is about to be closed due to a lack of popularity. Naoya determines to resurrect the spirit of old Saku High by creating a water polo club to compete with Suiran High, a private rival high school whose successful water polo team brings the town out of obscurity.

Needing seven members to start the club, Naoya builds friendship with the playful trio Tomoki Kimura, Kohei Shimura, and Shinsuke Kato, the pessimistic but good water polo player Ryuji Mifune, as well as the wild Ryo Chiaki and his friend Koki Miyaguchi. He is assisted by the school math teacher Chiharu Aoyama for advisory purposes. Naoya also gets emotional support from his childhood friend, Nagisa Iwasaki despite her being associated with Suiran High's water polo team, who grows to accept the current Naoya after her initial disappointment of seeing him changing into a yankee.

Slowly, Naoya learns about the team's problems and bring them from their sulking with a determination to beat Suiran High, whose water polo team is aced by Torao Kitajima, a frenemy of Ryuji who strives to beat the latter to win the heart of Rei Fujisaki, despite the fact that Rei is unconditionally in love with him. Later, Naoya also reunites with Kurosawa, but his expectation is temporarily stripped when he learns that Kurosawa has given up his pride on Saku High. During the Inter-High tournament against Suiran High, Naoya overcomes an injury brought upon by a member of Suiran High and manages to score his team's victory. After the match, Naoya confesses his feelings to Nagisa, who accepts.

The epilogue, narrated in a letter from Nagisa to Suiran High's water polo teams' adviser, Mayu Shoji, tells of the events happening after the Inter-High tournament: Saku High is successfully prevented from being closed and its water polo team continues to thrive; Ryuji competes for the national championship team thanks to his performance in the Inter-High tournament; while Kurosawa has regained his faith in Saku High and is training to be its teacher. The series ends with Naoya saving a boy from bullies and advising him never to give up, just as Kurosawa has done to him years before.

== Cast ==
- Yuto Nakajima as Naoya Inaba (稲葉 尚弥, Inaba Naoya)

The series' main protagonist, Naoya is a 20th century-era delinquent (known as yankee in Japan) who enrolls in Saku High School due to his admiration of a yankee graduate, Kurosawa, who once saved him from bullies and encouraged him to never give up in his dreams, only to find out that the school now exhibits low-lives who resign to them being the underdogs to Suiran High School, a prestigious private rival school. Determined to keep Saku High from being closed, Naoya decides to create a water polo team to compete against Suiran's own.

- Kento Yamazaki as Ryuji Mifune (三船 龍二, Mifune Ryūji)

A pessimistic student of Saku High who is secretly a water polo prodigy. Due to losing out to Torao on a personal water polo match while in middle school, Ryuji declined Suiran High's invitation to join their water polo club and distanced himself from the sports altogether. He is encouraged by his friends to play the sports again and later joins Saku High's water polo team to compete and win against Torao. Ryuji is in love with Nagisa and plans to confess to her if Saku High wins the Inter-High tournament against Suiran High; however, when Naoya's own confession to Nagisa is accepted, he backs out for their sake.

- Yuya Takaki as Torao Kitajima (北島 虎雄, Kitajima Torao)

The ace of Suiran High's male water polo team whom Naoya and Ryuji both make rivals with. He especially wants to win against Ryuji to finally get Rei's heart, as he believes that Rei is still attracted to Ryuji since their middle school times, despite the fact that Rei never actually loves Ryuji. Though he at first acts like a typical bully to Saku High, Torao shows a softer side as the series goes on as he calms down Nagisa in her rage against Goda for framing Naoya up for expulsion, and objects to using foul means to win against Saku High.

- Yudai Chiba as Tomoki Kimura (木村 朋生, Kimura Tomoki)

A student of Saku High and, together with Kohei and Shinsuke, a huge fan of idol Kanna Hashimoto. At first, he resigns for having to enroll in the underdog school of the town and is the most resistant to the idea that Saku High can beat Suiran High. However, when Naoto fights his way to obtain Kanna's autograph and bracelet for the trio, Tomoki relents and agrees to join Saku High's water polo team. Tomoki has a crush on Nagisa, but chooses to give up his feelings upon finding out that Nagisa is more attracted to Ryuji.

- Taishi Nakagawa as Kohei Shimura (志村 公平, Shimura Kōhei)

A member of Saku High's water polo team and best friend of Tomoki and Shinsuke. He is also a big fan of Kanna Hashimoto. When he joins up the Saku High's water polo team, he is the only one out of the seven who cannot swim and thus has to endure a separate training in the water before the team can properly play. Nevertheless, Kohei's determination to swim despite his inability is what seals Ryuji's decision to return to the water polo world and join Saku High's water polo team.

- Ryo Yoshizawa as Shinsuke Kato (加東 慎介, Katō Shinsuke)

A member of Saku High's water polo team and part of the trio consisting of himself, Kohei, and Tomoki, who adores idol Kanna Hashimoto, though he is comparatively calmer and more reserved than the two. He has an older brother who owns a restaurant that the water polo team and Nagisa frequent during their spare time.

- Shotaro Mamiya as Ryo Chiaki (千秋 亮, Chiaki Ryō)

A wild student of Saku High and best friend of Koki. He has a crush on his teacher Chiharu, but is genuinely more attracted to Ryoko, a Suiran High student he saves from being harmed by a Naoya impostor. During middle school, Chiaki was more introverted and was often bullied by Goda, but later stood up when Goda bullied Koki and promised to him that he will get stronger. He and Koki are Naoya's first recruits in Saku High's water polo team, with Chiaki determining to win against Goda.

- Yuma Yamoto as Koki Miyaguchi (宮口 幸喜, Miyaguchi Kōki)

A member of Saku High's water polo team and Chiaki's best friend. Koki admired Chiaki ever since the latter stood up for him when he was bullied by Goda and is surprised when he learned that the two attended the same school. Despite thinking that Chiaki has forgotten their first meeting, it is later shown to be not the case. In the epilogue, it is shown that Koki is dating Riko, which Nagisa describes as an "unexpected pairing".

- Sakurako Ohara as Nagisa Iwasaki (岩崎 渚, Iwasaki Nagisa)

Naoya's childhood friend who enrolls in Suiran High and serves as an aide to their water polo teams. She once played water polo, but quitted after realizing that she would never get a big break. She yearns for Naoya's return from overseas and is disappointed when she learns that he has become a yankee, but as the two live together, the two slowly rekindle their relationship. Though she believes herself to be in love with Ryuji, she realizes that Naoya has always been her foremost love.

- Aya Oomasa as Chiharu Aoyama (青山 千春, Aoyama Chiharu)

Saku High's math teacher who later becomes the adviser of the school's water polo team. At first, she doubts the team's ability to run against Suiran High, but is convinced by the principal to believe in them. When she was in middle school, she was one of the witnesses of Kurosawa saving Naoya from bullies, which motivated her to apply for a teaching position at Saku High.

- Yua Shinkawa as Rei Fujisaki (藤崎 玲, Fujisaki Rei)

A member of Suiran High's female water polo team and Torao's girlfriend. She is friends with both Torao and Ryuji since middle school, but is disappointed when Ryuji decided to quit the water polo scene after losing out to Torao. She brights up again when Ryuji makes a comeback, though despite Torao's misgivings, Rei has never been in love with Ryuji.

- Nobuyuki Suzuki as Takeshi Goda (郷田 剛, Gōda Takeshi)

A member of Suiran High's male water polo team. He frequently bullies Saku High and does not like the fact that they have formed a water polo team since Naoya's arrival, which ignites his hatred for Naoya. Due to this, he frames up Naoya on a vandalizing incident that almost expels him from Saku High, and, under Shoji's tip, injures Naoya's left shoulder just before the Inter-High tournament to make him more exposed against Suiran High.

- Hinako Sano as Riko Shibata (柴田 理子, Shibata Riko)

An aide of Suiran High's water polo teams, together with her upperclassman Nagisa. She is in love with Naoya, but regretfully gives up her feelings for Nagisa's sake. The epilogue reveals that Riko is dating Koki.

- Miwako Kakei as Ryoko Maehata (前畑 涼子, Maehata Ryōko)

A member of Suiran High's female water polo team. At first, Ryoko joins with her fellow Suiran High students in bullying Saku High, but mellows out after finding out that Goda is bribing a gangster into framing up Naoya for a vandalism. She gives the evidence that saves Naoya, and later becomes close to Chiaki, whom she successfully confesses to before the Inter-High tournament.

- Kana Kurashina as Mayu Shoji (庄司 真冬, Shōji Mayu)

The iron-hearted adviser of Suiran High's water polo teams. Her coldness came about due to losing a match against a rival team when she was still a student due to a dislocated shoulder, which disqualified her. Since then, she has made her goal to make Suiran High win against anyone, even if through underhanded means.

- Leo Morimoto as Shigenobu Arakawa (荒川 重信, Arakawa Shigenobu)

The kindly principal of Saku High. He has faith in his school despite their impending closure, especially once Naoya enrolls, and gives his advice to the school's teachers and students not to waver in their faith for them.

- Yukiya Kitamura as Hanzo Kuwahara (桑原 半蔵, Kuwahara Hanzō)

The grumpy vice-principal of Saku High. Despite being a teacher of Saku High, he constantly criticizes Saku High students for their supposed bad habits and actually sides with Suiran High in several matters, such as when Naoya is framed up for vandalism. After the act is proven wrong, however, Kuwahara grows to attach himself with the team and even gives the greatest contribution for their apparatus late into the series.

- You Yokoyama as Yoshio Kurosawa (黒澤 義男, Kurosawa Yoshio)

The legendary graduate of Saku High who became Naoya's idol when he saved him from bullies and encouraged him never to give up in his dreams. He gave his coat to Naoya and told him to return it once he became strong. However, when Naoya meets with Kurosawa again, the latter has backed out on his words and says that Saku High is "worthless". It turns out that his opinion changed because he was humiliated due to being Saku High's student. Kurosawa is convinced, though, to take back his words by Naoya, and, at the final episode, thanks Naoya by giving him his coat again.

- Sarutoki Minagawa as Toshio Iwasaki (岩崎 敏夫, Iwasaki Toshio)

Nagisa's father.

- Shoko Iketsu as Shizuka Iwasaki (岩崎 静香, Iwasaki Shizuka)

Nagisa's mother.

- Takashi Ukaji as Jin Samejima (鮫島 仁, Sameshima Jin)

A retired legendary water polo player who owns an inn near a beach. Principal Arakawa arranges for him to meet with Saku High's water polo team and teach them through secret means, such as forcing Naoya to cut up wood in order to build up his muscles.

- Kanna Hashimoto as herself

A member of the idol group Rev. from DVL Tomoki, Kohei, and Shinsuke adore. She became the sponsor for the national championship, hence why the trio are so determined to win against Suiran High so Kanna can cheer for them. Unbeknownst to Naoya, Kanna meets with him while she is preparing for a concert and is told by Naoya about Saku High's water polo team, whom he places his faith with Kanna says about this meeting to her fans before her concert in front of the bewildered Tomoki, Kohei, and Shinsuke, who immediately race to join Naoya in the summer camp that they abandoned.

== Episode Ratings ==
Episode	Broadcast Date	Ratings (Kanto Region)
01	12 July 2014	8.8%
02	19 July 2014	7.2%
03	2 August 2014	5.6%
04	9 August 2014	6.7%
05	6 August 2014	8.1%
06	23 August 2014	5.6%
07	30 August 2014	5.4%
08	6 September 2014	5.7%
09	13 September 2014	5.6%
10	20 September 2014	7.5%
Average		6.6%

== Notes ==
- ^Note 1: The filming for Water Polo Yankees started in June 2014.
- ^Note 2: Beginning sometime in the 1980s, the term "yankee" in Japan refers to delinquent youths. They are a frequent subject matter for manga (stereotypically with dyed blond hair, gang members and carrying sticks).
