= The Kitazawas: We Mind Our Own Business =

- Promotional poster
- Also known as: Momifuyu
- (もみ消して冬～わが家の問題なかったことに～)
- Genre: Comedy
- Written by: Shigeki Kaneko
- Directed by: Satoru Nakajima
- Starring: Ryosuke Yamada; Haru; Yukiyoshi Ozawa
- Ending theme: "Maeomuke" by Hey! Say! JUMP
- Country of origin: Japan
- Original language: Japanese
- No. of seasons: 1
- No. of episodes: 10

Production
- Executive producer: Atsushi Fukushi
- Producers: Hiroko Hazeyama; Takashi Akimoto
- Running time: 54 minutes

Original release
- Network: Nippon TV
- Release: January 13 – March 17, 2018

The Kitazawas: We Mind Our Own Business (Japanese: もみ消して冬～わが家の問題なかったことに～, Hepburn: Momikeshite Fuyu ~Wagaya no Mondai Nakatta Koto ni~) is a Japanese family comedy drama starring Ryosuke Yamada, Haru, and Yukiyoshi Ozawa. It was first broadcast on January 13, 2018, on Nippon TV.

A Summer sequel, "The Kitazawas Summer 2019", aired in 2019, the three main actors reprising their roles.

== Plot ==
The story revolves around the Kitazawa family. The father, Taizo, is a bestselling writer who owns a private middle school, and is about to open a high school in 3 years. All of his children are Tokyo University graduates: The eldest son, Hirofumi, is a genius surgeon, the only daughter, Chiaki, is a competent lawyer, and the youngest son, Shusaku, is a police detective. While maintaining their 'perfect' family, the siblings try to cover up every single problem that comes at them.

=== Summer 2019 ===
Hirofumi, the eldest of the Kitazawa children, returns from Los Angeles, where he learned new medical techniques; he brings A.I. Kenji and A.I. Sayuri to the Kitazawa family. Shusaku quits his job in the police to become a pastry chef, but fails. He acts as a ghostwriter for his father, and is assisted by the A.I. provided by Hirofumi.

== Cast ==
- Ryosuke Yamada as Shusaku Kitazawa (北沢 秀作, Kitazawa Shūsaku)

Shusaku is the main character and narrator of the story. The youngest son of the family, he is 25 years old. Being a police officer, Shusaku is sometimes conflicted whether to help his family or stay with his professionalism as a law enforcer. He became a police officer because his siblings recommended it, because according to Hirofumi, surgeon, lawyer, and police officer are seen as popular jobs among housewives. His mother died when he was 5 years old.
Yamada commented that Shusaku is a kind of person who always hides his emotion and has the lowest position of the family, being the youngest.

- Haru as Chiaki Kitazawa (北沢 知晶, Kitazawa Chiaki)

The only daughter of the family, Chiaki is 27 years old. She is a lawyer who has a great sense of justice and will not stay still if someone stained her family. She has a bit tendency of being a sadistic.
Haru commented that Chiaki will not admit if she's wrong and is serious even in odd situations.

- Yukiyoshi Ozawa as Hirofumi Kitazawa (北沢 博文, Kitazawa Hirofumi)

Hirofumi is the oldest son; he is 38 years old. A genius surgeon who is rumored to inherit the hospital's director position. He is actually a narcissistic.
Ozawa commented that while he does love his family, Hirofumi's narcissistic personality making him a bit of a shifty character.

- Nozomu Kotaki as Yuuki Ozeki (尾関 光希, Ozeki Yūki)

Shusaku's junior and a part of Special Investigation Team at Metropolitan Police Department; he is 24 years old. A pro negotiator.

- Yuri Tsunematsu as Satoko Ikee (池江 里子, Ikee Satoko)

A female police officer whom Shusaku has crush on. She is 23 years old.

- Kazuya Kojima as Misao Tsugetsuna (手毛綱 美鎖夫, Tsugetsuna Misao)

40 years old. Laundry man one of whose customers is the Kitazawa household.

- Yudai Chiba as Matsuya Kusunoki (楠木 松也, Kuzunoki Matsuya)

An apprentice butler of the Kitazawa family. He is 27 years old.

- Kazuyuki Asano as Rinji Koiwai (小岩井 凛治, Koiwai Rinji)

A butler of the Kitazawa family. He is 58 years old.

- Baijaku Nakamura as Taizo Kitazawa (北沢 泰蔵, Kitazawa Taizō)

The father of the Kitazawa family, he is 63 years old. A bestseller writer and headmaster of Kitazawa Private Middle School.

== Staff ==
- Screenplay: Shigeki Kaneko
- Theme song: "Maeomuke" (マエヲムケ) by Hey! Say! JUMP
- Executive Producer: Atsushi Fukushi
- Producer: Hiroko Hazeyama, Takashi Akimoto
- Director: Satoru Nakajima
- Production Cooperation: Office Cresendo
- Production work: Nippon TV

== Episodes ==
No.	Title	Original release date	Viewers (Kanto region)
1	"セレブ一家の爆笑スキャンダル! 末っ子悲壮な決意で証拠隠滅大作戦"	January 13, 2018	13.3%
2	"愛犬逃走クビの危機! 替え玉作戦で姉ちゃん豹変"	January 20, 2018	11.1%
3	"メイド喫茶事件に親父も参戦!激うまカレーの真相"	January 27, 2018	11.1%
4	"入れ墨執事に恋!? 姉ご乱心のキス&父豆まき暴投"	February 3, 2018	11.0%
5	"骨肉の恋愛バトル!牛丼兄VSうなぎ弟チョコ争奪戦"	February 10, 2018	7.1%
6	"熟女サスペンスで男の色気が人生最大!?"	February 17, 2018	8.1%
7	"人望ゼロ兄弟の逆襲ハンドベルと南の島のすね毛"	February 24, 2018	6.6%
8	"大胆彼女に姉報復で嫌がらせ!? 靴消失の意外な真相"	March 3, 2018	9.5%
9	"最終章突入で最大のピンチ! さよなら僕の家族たち"	March 10, 2018	9.0%
10	"セレブ一家最後の事件! 衝撃の逮捕が招く幸せ"	March 17, 2018	10.8%

Preceded by Saki ni Umareta Dake no Boku; October 14, 2017 – December 16, 2017	Nippon TV Saturday Dramas; Saturday 22:00 – 22:54 (JST); 2018	Succeeded by Miss Devil: Jinji no Akuma Tsubaki Mako; April 2018
