= Ride with Me (Hey! Say! JUMP song) =

"Ride With Me"

Single by Hey! Say! JUMP

from the album S3ART
- A-side: "Ride With Me"
- Released: December 25, 2013 (Japan)
- Recorded: 2013
- Genre: J-pop
- Label: J Storm, Johnny & Associates
- Songwriter(s): Takuma Kitahashi, Minami Minami, Taku Takahashi

Hey! Say! JUMP singles chronology
"Come On A My House" (2013)	"Ride With Me" (2013)	"AinoArika/Aisureba Motto Happy Life" (2014)

"Ride With Me" is a single by Hey! Say! JUMP, released on December 25, 2013. The song was used as the ending theme song for the 2nd special drama, Kindaichi Shounen no Jikenbo Neo SP2: Gokumon Juku Satsujin Jiken, starring group members, Daiki Arioka and Ryosuke Yamada, which aired in January 2014.

== Regular Edition ==
CD

1. "Ride With Me"
2. "School Girl"
3. "Hands Up"
4. "Ride With Me" (Original Karaoke)
5. "School Girl" (Original Karaoke)
6. "Hands Up" (Original Karaoke)

== Limited Edition 1 ==
CD

1. "Ride With Me"
2. "Ride With Me" (Original Karaoke)

DVD

1. "Ride With Me" (PV & Making of)

== Limited Edition 2 ==
CD

1. "Ride With Me"
2. "Go To The Future"
3. "GIFT"
4. "Ride With Me" (Original Karaoke)
5. "Go To The Future" (Original Karaoke)
6. "GIFT" (Original Karaoke)
