= Koro Sensations =

Single by Hey! Say! JUMP

from the album JUMPing CAR
- Released: (Japan) March 15, 2015
- Recorded: 2015
- Genre: J-pop
- Label: Johnny & Associates, J Storm

Hey! Say! JUMP singles chronology
"Weekender/Asu e no YELL" (2014)	"Koro Sensations" (2015)	"Chau#/我 I Need You" (2015)

"Koro Sensations" is a single by Hey! Say! JUMP. It was released on March 15, 2015. It was released as a DVD single under the name Sensations for Ryosuke Yamada's movie, Assassination Classroom. The members each have a code name for the new unit. The group made two music videos for the single: Battle Mode and Operation Mode.

== Regular Edition ==
DVD

1. "Koro Sensations" PV Battle Mode
2. "Koro Sensations" PV Operation mode
3. "Koro Sensations" Making of PV Passive Side

== Limited Edition ==
CD

1. "Koro Sensations"
2. "Koro Sensations" (Original Karaoke)

DVD

1. "Koro Sensations" PV Battle Mode
2. "Koro Sensations" Making of PV Active Side
