= AinoArika / Aisureba Motto Happy Life =

"AinoArika/Aisureba Motto Happy Life"

Single by Hey! Say! JUMP

from the album S3ART
- Released: (Japan) February 5, 2014
- Recorded: 2014
- Genre: J-pop
- Label: J Storm, Johnny & Associates

Hey! Say! JUMP singles chronology
| "Ride With Me" (2013) | "AinoArika/Aisureba Motto Happy Life" (2014) | "Weekender/Asu e no YELL" (2014) |

"AinoArika/Aisureba Motto Happy Life" is a single by the Japanese idol group Hey! Say! JUMP. It was released on February 5, 2014.

The single debuted at number one on the weekly Oricon Singles Chart and reached number one on the Billboard Japan Hot 100.

By the end of 2014, It was ranked as the 28th best-selling single in Japan, with total sales of 236,027 copies.

== Regular Edition ==
CD

1. "AinoArika"
2. "Aisureba Motto Happy Life"
3. "Oh! My Jelly! (Bokura wa OK)" - Hey! Say! 7
4. "Sugiru Setsuna (スギルセツナ)" - Hey! Say! BEST
5. "Aino Arika" (Original Karaoke)
6. "Aisureba Motto Happy Life" (Original Karaoke)
7. "Oh! My Jelly! (Bokura wa OK)" (Original Karaoke) - Hey! Say! 7
8. "Sugiru Setsuna (スギルセツナ)" (Original Karaoke) - Hey! Say! BEST

== Limited Edition 1 ==
CD

1. "AinoArika"
2. "Aisureba Motto Happy Life"

DVD

1. "AinoArika" (PV & Making of)

== Limited Edition 2 ==
CD

1. "AinoArika"
2. "Aisureba Motto Happy Life"

DVD

1. "Aisureba Motto Happy Life" (PV & Making of)
