= Sayonara Sensation =

Single by Hey! Say! JUMP
- Released: March 23, 2016 (Japan)
- Recorded: 2016
- Genre: J-pop
- Label: Johnny & Associates, J Storm

Hey! Say! JUMP singles chronology
"Kimi Attraction" (2015)	"Sayonara Sensation" (2016)	"Maji SUNSHINE" (2016)

"Sayonara Sensation" is the second single by Hey! Say! JUMP's sub group, Sensations, and the group's eighteenth single overall. It was released for the film Assassination Classroom: Graduation, starring group member Ryosuke Yamada. The group made two music videos for the single: New Gear Mode and Final Battle Mode.

== Regular Edition ==
DVD

1. New Gear Mode PV
2. Cathode Side PV Making
3. Final Battle Mode & New Gear Mode PV & Cathode Side PV Making

== Limited Edition ==
CD

1. "Sayonara Sensation"
2. "Sayonara Sensation" (Original Karaoke)

DVD

1. Final Battle Mode PV
2. Anode Side PV
3. Final Battle Mode PV & Anode Side PV Making
