= Chau / I Need You =

"Chau#/我 I Need You"

Single by Hey! Say! JUMP

from the album JUMPing CAR
- Released: (Japan) April 29, 2015
- Recorded: 2015
- Genre: J-pop
- Label: Johnny & Associates, J Storm

Hey! Say! JUMP singles chronology
"Koro Sensations" (2015)	"Chau#/我 I Need You" (2015)	"Kimi Attraction" (2015)

"Chau#/我 I Need You" is a single by Hey! Say! JUMP. It was released on April 29, 2015.

"Chau#" was used in the CM for Bourbon's Almond Caramel Popcorn which stars the members themselves. Meanwhile, "我 I Need You" was the ending theme for TV Tokyo's variety program Little Tokyo Live that the members appear on as regulars every other week. This number delivers a love message in an enthusiastic way.

The regular edition included Hey! Say! BEST's "Through", and Hey! Say! 7's "KAZEKAORU". The limited edition DVD contained the PV and making footage for "Chau#", while the Regular First Press Edition DVD contained other special footage.

== Regular Edition ==
CD

1. "Chau#"
2. "我 I Need You"
3. "Through" - Hey! Say! BEST
4. "KAZEKAORU" - Hey! Say! 7
5. "Chau#" (Original Karaoke）
6. "我 I Need You" (Original Karaoke)
7. "Through" (Original Karaoke) - Hey! Say! BEST
8. "KAZEKAORU" (Original Karaoke) - Hey! Say! 7

== Regular First Press Edition ==
DVD

1. Special Footage "Jyan Jyan Kotaete!! Jyan! Jyan! JUMQ"

== Limited Edition ==
CD

1. "Chau#"
2. "我 I Need You"

DVD

1. "Chau#" (PV & Making of)
