= Weekender / Asu e no Yell =

"Weekender/Asu e no Yell"

Single by Hey! Say! JUMP

from the album JUMPing CAR
- Released: (Japan) September 3, 2014
- Recorded: 2014
- Genre: J-pop
- Label: J Storm, Johnny & Associates

Hey! Say! JUMP singles chronology
"AinoArika/Aisureba Motto Happy Life" (2014)	"Weekender/Asu e no Yell" (2014)	"Koro Sensations" (2015)

"Weekender" / "Asu e no Yell" is a single by Hey! Say! JUMP. It was released on September 3, 2014. It debuted in number one on the weekly Oricon Singles Chart and reached number one on the Billboard Japan Hot 100. It was the 29th best-selling single of 2014 in Japan, with 214,581 copies.

"Weekender" was used as the theme song for Ryosuke Yamada's drama, Kindaichi Shounen no Jikenbo Neo; "Asu e no Yell" was used as the theme song for Yuto Nakajima's drama, Suikyu Yankees.

== Regular edition ==
CD

1. "Weekender"
2. "Asu e no Yell"
3. "Through the Night"
4. "Rainbow Candy Girl"
5. "Weekender" (Original Karaoke)
6. "Asu e no YELL" (Original Karaoke)
7. "Through the Night" (Original Karaoke)
8. "Rainbow Candy Girl" (Original Karaoke)

== Limited edition 1 ==
CD

1. "Weekender"
2. "Asu e no Yell"

DVD

1. "Weekender" (PV & Making of)

== Limited edition 2 ==
CD

1. "Asu e no Yell"
2. "Weekender"

DVD

1. "Asu e no Yell" (PV & Making of)
