= Come On a My House =

Single by Hey! Say! JUMP

from the album S3art
- B-side: "Bounce"; "New Hope (Konna ni Bokura wa Hitotsu)"
- Released: June 26, 2013
- Recorded: 2013
- Genre: J-pop
- Label: J Storm, Johnny & Associates
- Songwriter(s): Komei Kobayashi; Makaino Koji

Hey! Say! JUMP singles chronology
"Super Delicate" (2012)	"Come On a My House" (2013)	"Ride with Me" (2013)

"Come On a My House" is a single by Hey! Say! JUMP. The single was released in three different versions: two limited editions and a regular edition. The first limited edition came with a DVD while the two other versions were just CD's, each with a different list of song (except for the title song).

The title song was used as the CM song for House Foods’ Vermont Curry.

== Regular edition ==
CD

1. "Come On a My House"
2. "Bounce"
3. "New Hope (Konna ni Bokura wa Hitotsu)"
4. "Come On a My House" (Original Karaoke)
5. "Bounce" (Original Karaoke)
6. "New Hope (Konna ni Bokura wa Hitotsu)" (Original Karaoke)

== Limited edition 1 ==
CD

1. "Come On a My House"
2. "Come On a My House" (Original Karaoke)

DVD

1. "Come On a My House" (PV & Making of)

== Limited edition 2 ==
CD

1. "Come On a My House"
2. "Just for You" by Hey! Say! 7
3. "Scramble" by Hey! Say! BEST
4. "Come On a My House" (Original Karaoke)
5. "Just for You" (Original Karaoke) by Hey! Say! 7
6. "Scramble" (Original Karaoke) by Hey! Say! BEST

== Release history ==
Release history and formats for "Come On a My House"
Country	Date	Format	Label
Japan	June 26, 2013	CDJACA-5372; LE CD+DVDJACA-5369; LE CDJACA-5371	J Storm
