= Give Me Love (Hey! Say! JUMP song) =

Single by Hey! Say! JUMP
- Released: December 14, 2016 (Japan)
- Recorded: 2016
- Genre: J-pop, R&B
- Label: Johnny & Associates, J Storm

Hey! Say! JUMP singles chronology
"Fantastic Time" (2016)	"Give Me Love" (2016)

"Give Me Love" is a single by Hey! Say! JUMP. It was released on December 14, 2016. The song is being used as the theme song for the Fuji TV drama Cain and Abel. The show, which stars group member Ryosuke Yamada, began airing on October 17, 2016.

"Give Me Love" is a mellow R&B song that deals with the idea of "true love" and the conflicts that come with finding it.

Three versions of the single are: one CD/DVD version and 2 CD-Only. Each version has a B-side, with a total of five songs being spread across the various releases.

== Regular Edition ==
CD

1. "Give Me Love"
2. "Glorious"
3. "Ashita Hallelujah"
4. "Give Me Love" (Original Karaoke)
5. "Glorious" (Original Karaoke)
6. "Ashita Hallelujah" (Original Karaoke)

== Regular Edition First Press ==
CD

1. "Give Me Love"
2. "TOY"
3. "Baby I Love You"
4. "TOY" (Original Karaoke)
5. "Baby I Love You" (Original Karaoke)

== Limited Edition ==
CD

1. "Give Me Love"
2. "Traffic Jam"
3. "Traffic Jam" (Original Karaoke)

DVD

1. "Give Me Love" (PV & Making of)
