= Mayonaka no Shadow Boy =

Single by Hey! Say! JUMP

from the album JUMP No. 1
- B-side: "School Kakumei"
- Released: (Japan) October 22, 2008
- Recorded: 2008
- Genre: J-pop
- Label: J Storm, Johnny & Associates

Hey! Say! JUMP singles chronology
"Your Seed/Bōken Rider" (2008)	"Mayonaka no Shadow Boy" (2008)	"Hitomi no Screen" (2010)

Limited Edition Cover

"Mayonaka no Shadow Boy" is a single released by Hey! Say! JUMP. It was released on October 22, 2008.

== Information ==
The single is Hey! Say! JUMP's first actual love song, which is used as a theme to the TV drama Scrap Teacher starring Hey! Say! JUMP members Daiki Arioka, Ryosuke Yamada, Yuto Nakajima, Yuri Chinen. The song has sad, passionate lyrics and a melancholic melody with a Spanish taste. Limited edition includes a bonus DVD with the music video of "Mayonaka no Shadow Boy," making-of footage, and alternate jacket artwork. Regular edition features three bonus karaoke versions.

By the end of the year, "Mayonaka no Shadow Boy" was reported by Oricon to sell 266,193 copies and was later certified Platinum by RIAJ denoting over 250,000 shipments.

== Regular Edition ==
CD

1. "Mayonaka no Shadow Boy"
2. "School Kakumei"
3. "Deep Night Kimi Omou"
4. "Mayonaka no Shadow Boy" (Original Karaoke)
5. "School Kakumei" (Original Karaoke)
6. "Deep Night Kimi Omou" (Original Karaoke)

== Limited Edition ==
CD

1. "Mayonaka no Shadow Boy"
2. "School Kakumei"

DVD

1. "Mayonaka no Shadow Boy" (PV & Making of)

== Charts and certifications ==
=== Charts ===
Chart (2008)	Sales	Peak position
Japan Oricon Weekly Singles Chart	211322	1
Japan Oricon Monthly Singles Chart		3
Japan Oricon Yearly Singles Chart	266,193	21

=== Sales and certifications ===
Country	Provider	Sales	Certification
Japan	RIAJ	266,193	Platinum
