= Fantastic Time =

Single by Hey! Say! JUMP
- Released: October 26, 2016 (Japan)
- Recorded: 2016
- Genre: J-pop
- Label: Johnny & Associates, J Storm

Hey! Say! JUMP singles chronology
"Maji SUNSHINE" (2016)	"Fantastic Time" (2016)	"Give Me Love" (2016)

"Fantastic Time" is a single by Hey! Say! JUMP. It was released on October 26, 2016.

The title song is the opening theme for NTV's anime Time Bokan 24, which started on October 1, 2016. It's a song that conveys the message: "Vigorously move forward while being excited about the 'present' that connects the past and the future."

The single was available for purchase in three different types: Regular Edition, Regular Edition First Press, and Limited Edition. The Limited Edition DVD contains a PV, making-of-footage, and choreography video. The Regular Edition First Press included a photo book featuring pictures the members took of each other. Finally, the Regular Edition comes with three coupling songs and their karaoke versions.

== Regular Edition ==
CD

1. "Fantastic Time"
2. "Never Let You Go"
3. "Wonder Road"
4. "What A Feeling"
5. "Fantastic Time" (Original Karaoke)
6. "Never Let You Go" (Original Karaoke)
7. "Wonder Road" (Original Karaoke)
8. "What A Feeling" (Original Karaoke)

== Regular Edition First Press ==
CD

1. "Fantastic Time"
2. "Never Let You Go"
3. "Seijaku no Asa, Kimi to Iru Sekai。"
4. "Seijaku no Asa, Kimi to Iru Sekai。" (Original Karaoke)
- FANtastic Photo Book

== Limited Edition ==
CD

1. "Fantastic Time"

DVD

1. "Fantastic Time" (PV & Making of)
2. Practice Time (Member Choreography Video)
