= Hey! Say! JUMP =

Japanese idol group

- Also known as: JUMP; Sensations (せんせーションズ)
- Origin: Tokyo, Japan
- Years active: 2007–present
- Labels: Storm Labels, Starto Entertainment
- Members: Hey! Say! BEST; Kota Yabu; Yuya Takaki; Kei Inoo; Hikaru Yaotome; Daiki Arioka; Hey! Say! 7 Ryosuke Yamada; Yuri Chinen
- Past members: Hey! Say! 7 Ryutaro Morimoto; Keito Okamoto; Yuto Nakajima
- Website: Hey! Say! JUMP; Johnny's-net

Hey! Say! JUMP (HSJ or JUMP) is a seven-member Japanese boy band under the Japanese talent agency Starto Entertainment (formerly from Johnny & Associates). The group is split into two sub-groups: Hey! Say! BEST and Hey! Say! 7. In Japan they sold more than 10 million physical copies.

Hey! Say! JUMP originally debuted with ten members, the largest group in Johnny's history. In 2011, Ryutaro Morimoto was indefinitely suspended from the group following an underage smoking scandal. On April 11, 2021, Keito Okamoto announced that he would be leaving the group in order to pursue an acting career but would be remaining under Johnny & Associates. On August 28, 2025 Yuto Nakajima announced he would graduate from the group.

== History ==
=== Formation ===
Hey! Say! 7
- Origin: Tokyo, Japan
- Genre: J-pop
- Years active: 2007
- Labels: Starto Entertainment, Storm Labels
- Members: 5

During KAT-TUN's spring concert on April 3, 2007, Yuya Takaki, Daiki Arioka, Ryosuke Yamada, Yuto Nakajima and Yuri Chinen were announced as a temporary group called Hey! Say! 7. The name refers to the Heisei period during which all members were born, as well as to the year 2007 as the group's formation year. The special unit was formed to sing the opening and closing songs of the TBS anime Lovely Complex.

On June 16, 2007, it was announced that Hey! Say! 7 would release "Hey! Say!" and "Bon Bon", as a single on August 1. This later became Hey! Say! JUMP's single. The single sold 120,520 copies in its first week, making the group the youngest male group to top the Oricon singles chart.

=== 2007–2010: Debut and early releases ===
On September 24, the five members of Hey! Say! 7 were joined by Kota Yabu, Kei Inoo, Hikaru Yaotome, Keito Okamoto and Ryutaro Morimoto, all represented by Johnny's Jr's. The ten-member group was organized into two sub-groups of five, with the older members forming Hey! Say! BEST and the younger members in Hey! Say! 7.

It was announced that they would release their first CD on November 14, 2007, including the song "Ultra Music Power", which was used as the theme at Japan's Volleyball World Cup Relay 2007.

On December 22, the group held their debut concert: Debut Concert Ikinari! in Tokyo Dome. With an average age of 15.7, they were the youngest group to perform in the Tokyo Dome. A concert DVD was released on April 30, 2008.

The group released their third single "Dreams Come True" on May 21, which topped the Oricon Chart. In July 2008, it was announced that the group's fourth new single "Your Seed" would be used as the title song for the Japanese release of the animated film Kung-Fu Panda.

In October 2008, the group released the single "Mayonaka no Shadow Boy". It was used as the theme song for the drama Scrap Teacher, which starred members Arioka, Yamada, Nakajima, and Chinen.

After the full group's tour, junior division Hey! Say! 7 had their first concert series called Hey! Say! 7 Spring Concert 09 MONKEY. Following this, the entire group toured their concert Hey! Say! JUMP CONCERT TOUR Spring '09. A second concert DVD, Hey! Say! JUMP-ing Tour '08–'09, was released in April 2009.

On February 24, 2010, after a year and a half of touring, the group released their sixth single "Hitomi no Screen", which topped the Oricon weekly singles chart with 202,000 sales.

The group released its first album, Jump No. 1, on July 7, 2010. On December 15, the group released the single "Arigatō (Sekai no Doko ni Ite mo)". It reached number one on the Oricon singles chart, and sold 151,000 copies on its first week.

=== 2011: Yan Yan JUMP, Morimoto's suspension, The Smurfs ===
Hey! Say! JUMP and other Johnny's Jr. members starred in the 2011 variety show Yan Yan JUMP. It was based on Yan Yan Utau Studio, which had aired two decades earlier, featuring senior celebrities of Johnny & Associates.

The group was surrounded by controversy in June 2011 after photos of Ryutaro Morimoto smoking while underage were leaked. When he was asked about the photos, he said "it was alright" and that it was "no big deal". In response to the scandal, Johnny's Entertainment issued a statement of apology the following day and planned to indefinitely suspend Morimoto from all of his activities. Following the removal of Morimoto's profile from the official Johnny & Associates website, Johnny Kitagawa stated that Morimoto had ambitions to focus on studying and denied any possibility of his returning to the group.

On June 29, the group released the new single "Over". It peaked at number one on the Oricon singles chart on its first day, and was the group's highest-selling single since "Ultra Music Power" in 2007.

On September 21, 2011, they released their ninth single, "Magic Power", their first release after Morimoto's suspension. "Magic Power" was used as the theme for the Japanese dub of The Smurfs, in which members Yamada and Chinen provided the voices for Clumsy Smurf and Brainy Smurf.

=== 2012: Asian tour, musical and second album ===
The group held their first Asian concert tour from March to June 2012, performing in Taiwan, Thailand, South Korea, and Japan. However, on March 15, it was announced that the Hong Kong leg would be postponed until May and that the Bangkok tour was cancelled for unstated reasons. The tour was launched at the Yokohama Arena on May 3.

Their tenth single, "Super Delicate", was released on February 22, and was used as a theme song for Risou no Musuko.

On March 22, it was announced that a new musical called Johnny's World would be produced and directed by Johnny Kitagawa and start its run at the Imperial Garden Theater in November 2012. Hey! Say! JUMP would be the main cast while one hundred others made an appearance including Kis-My-Ft2, Sexy Zone, A.B.C-Z and Johnny's Jr., and guest appearances by Kamenashi Kazuya, Takizawa Hideaki and Domoto Koichi.

On April 25, the group announced that they would be releasing their second album, JUMP World, with their singles from "Arigatō (Sekai no Doko ni Ite mo)" onwards.

At the end of 2012, it was announced that Ryosuke Yamada would be making his solo debut with the single "Mystery Virgin" on January 9, 2013. The song was first solicited to mainstream on the radio on November 30, 2012, and was available for digital download on December 26, 2012.

=== 2013–2014: S3art, Live with Me and shows ===
JUMP held another nationwide tour, Hey! Say! JUMP Zenkoku e JUMP Tour 2013, from April to August 2013. The corresponding DVD with scenes from the concert reached the top spot on the Oricon chart. Both of the singles that they released in 2013, "Come On A My House" and "Ride with Me", went to number one on the Oricon chart. The latter was the theme song of the 2014 sequel to Kindaichi Case Files, with Yamada reprising his role.

In January 2014, the group released "AinoArika". The song was used as the theme for Dark System Koi no Ouza Ketteisen, starring Yaotome and Inoo. The single topped the Oricon chart.

Other acting appearances by the group's members include Yamada and Arioka in the drama Kindaichi Shounen no Jikenbo Neo, Nakajima and Takaki in Suikyu Yankees, with Takaki also appearing in Dr. DMAT and HAMU. The group released a double A-side single called "Weekender/Asu e no Yell", which was the theme song for Yamada's and Nakajima's dramas, and topped the Oricon chart.

The group's third album S3ART went to number one on the Oricon chart the week it was released. The group embarked on an accompanying tour for the album titled Hey! Say! JUMP Live Tour 2014 S3ART including a show in Tokyo Dome.

=== 2015: JUMPing Car, "Chau#", Itadaki High JUMP, 24-hour television, JUMPing CARnival and "Kimi Attraction" ===
In 2015, the group started their first TV show called Itadaki High JUMP and hosted Little Tokyo Life with Johnny's West, another Johnny's group. They were also the main personalities of 24-hour television.

In March, Yamada made his film debut as Nagisa Shiota in the live action adaptation of Assassination Classroom. The group released the single Sensations, which included the song Koro Sensations used as the image song of the movie. The single topped the Oricon chart.

The following singles, "Chau#/我 I Need You" and "Kimi Attraction", and their fourth album JUMPing Car also topped the charts. They promoted the album with a tour titled Hey! Say! JUMP LIVE TOUR 2015 JUMPing CARnival and collaborated with the annual Johnny's Countdown Concert which was broadcast live.

JUMP held their own 2015–2016 countdown concert at Kyocera Dome, making them the youngest group of Johnny's Entertainment to ever hold their own countdown concert.

=== 2016: Dear, "Sayonara Sensation", "Maji Sunshine", "Fantastic Time", "Give Me Love" and FNS 27Hour Festival ===
Hey! Say! JUMP returned as their sub unit, Sensations, and released the single for the movie titled "Sayonara Sensation". It was released for the film Assassination Classroom: Graduation, starring Yamada.

The group also released the single "Maji Sunshine". It topped the Oricon charts in its first week, and was used for the group's advertisement for KOSE Cosmeport Cosmetics. They were one of the main personalities of Fuji Television's FNS 27Hour Festival, with Inoo being one of the main MCs. During this, their show Itadaki High JUMP also had a crossover with Kis-My-Ft2's show Kisumai Busaiku in which the two groups competed in various activities.

On July 27, the group released their fifth album titled Dear which sold 141,079 copies on its first day. It landed on the No. 1 spot at the Oricon Weekly Album Chart. In support of the album, a tour started on July 28 at the Osaka-jō Hall called Hey! Say! JUMP LIVE TOUR 2016 DEAR. On October 26, the group released a new single called "Fantastic Time", which was used as the opening theme for anime Time Bokan 24.

On December 14, the group released a new single called "Give Me Love", which was used for the drama Cain and Abel starring member Yamada. It was described as a mellow R&B song about life's troubles and love.

=== 2017–present ===
The song "Over the Top" was announced as the new opening theme song for the anime タイムボカン24 (Time Bokan 24).

To honor the group's tenth anniversary, the greatest hits album Hey! Say! JUMP 2007-2017 I/O was released on July 26, 2017, featuring all 23 singles from their first ten years.

"Maeomuke" was released on February 14, 2018, and was the theme song for the drama The Kitazawas: We Mind Our Own Business, which starred Yamada.

In April 2021, Okamoto announce he would leave the group to pursue an acting career, remaining as part of the agency.

On October 12, 2023, Hey! Say! JUMP announced through their fan club that they would no longer be performing the song "Ultra Music Power", their debut song, as a consequence of the agency's sexual abuse scandal, citing the lyric line "J! Johnny's!" as the reason. They also stated they won't change the group name as they never considered the "J" in "JUMP" as "Johnny's" and will continue to perform as Hey! Say! JUMP.

On August 28, 2025, Yuto Nakajima announced his graduation from the group to seek an acting career. According to the Starto Entertainment post, he is to open a personal fan club in October, date pending.

On October 3, 2025, Hey！Say！JUMP announced their Halloween digital single "Ghost" to be released on October 8, together with a music video coreographed by Travis Japan's Kaito Miyachika and dancer Riehata's group RHT.'s Macoto. In addition, everyone that downloads the song from the different music download service and registers in the special page within the application period, will receive an original image as a gift. Image vary depending on the download site chosen.

On December 12, 2025, it was announced that Hey! Say! Jump's new song "Run This World" would be used for a collaboration cm with Japan Racing Association for the 70th Arima Kinen special project "Dive into Arima".

Previous to the celebration of their 20th anniversary, the group embarks in a special project. Hey! Say! JUMP One Night Voyage has the members divided by pairs and travelling to different countries in Asia. The members' mission for the trip is to "experience the vibrant culture of Asia and imprint the 'beautiful sunrise' into their memories" and "further deepen the bonds between the members." The project was broadcast on MBS in the form of three episodes airing in August and September 2026. They are a summary of a 10–episode series streamed on Netflix following the on–air broadcasts.

== Members ==
=== Hey! Say! BEST ===
- Kota Yabu (薮 宏太; born January 31, 1990)
- Yuya Takaki (髙木 雄也; born March 26, 1990)
- Kei Inoo (伊野尾 慧; born June 22, 1990)
- Hikaru Yaotome (八乙女 光; born December 2, 1990)
- Daiki Arioka (有岡 大貴; born April 15, 1991)

=== Hey! Say! 7 ===
- Ryosuke Yamada (山田 涼介; born May 9, 1993)
- Yuto Nakajima (中島 裕翔; born August 10, 1993)
- Yuri Chinen (知念 侑李; born November 30, 1993)

== Units ==
Hey! Say! 7 (a temporary group before Hey! Say! JUMP was formed)

- Yuya Takaki
- Daiki Arioka
- Ryosuke Yamada
- Yuto Nakajima
- Yuri Chinen

=== S3ART Units ===
Kaito y-ELLOW-voice (怪盗y-ELLOW-voice)

- Yuya Takaki
- Hikaru Yaotome
- Ryosuke Yamada

Night Style People

- Kota Yabu
- Yuto Nakajima
- Yuri Chinen

Aioitai (愛追I隊)

- Kei Inoo
- Daiki Arioka
- Keito Okamoto

=== Sensations ===
According to lore, Sensations is a group that looks like Hey! Say! JUMP, but is different. Its origin is as an assassin group under contract to kill Koro-sensei, but that failed and was made to become a sing-and-dance group as punishment. The group sings the theme songs for Assassination Classroom and Assassination Classroom: Graduation films.

- Kota Yabu as Scope (スコープ)
- Yuya Takaki as Rapid Fire (ラピッドファイヤー)
- Kei Inoo as Geek (ギーク)
- Hikaru Yaotome as Sonic Hunter (ソニックハンター)
- Daiki Arioka as Falcon Jr. (ファルコンJr.)
- Keito Okamoto as Shinobi (SHINOBI)
- Ryosuke Yamada as Commander (コマンダー)
- Yuto Nakajima as Bullet (弾丸)
- Yuri Chinen as Doctor (ドクター)

=== JUMPing Carnival Units ===
UNION

- Kota Yabu
- Hikaru Yaotome
- Daiki Arioka

Pet Shop Love Motion

- Yuya Takaki
- Kei Inoo
- Yuto Nakajima
- Yuri Chinen

Sangatsu Juuyokka ~ Tokei

- Ryosuke Yamada
- Keito Okamoto

=== A.Y.T. ===
- Yuya Takaki
- Hikaru Yaotome
- Daiki Arioka

== Filmography ==
- Hey! Say! JUMP One Night Voyage (2026)

== Discography ==
- JUMP No. 1 (2010)
- JUMP World (2012)
- S3ART (2014)
- JUMPing Car (2015)
- Dear (2016)
- Sense or Love (2018)
- Parade (2019)
- Fab! (Music Speaks.) (2020)
- Filmusic! (2022)
- Pull Up! (2023)
- H+ (2024)
- S Say (2025)
- Juliet (2026)

== Awards ==
=== Japan Gold Disc Awards ===
The Recording Industry Association of Japan recognized the group with the following Japan Gold Disc Awards for music sales:

Year	Nominee / work	Award	Result
2008	Hey! Say! JUMP	The Best 10 New Artists	Won
2008	"Ultra Music Power"	The Best 10 Singles	Won
2015	Hey! Say! JUMP	Yahoo! Search Awards: Idol Award	Won

== Commercials ==
- Japan Racing Association (2025)
