= Kimi Attraction =

Single by Hey! Say! JUMP

from the album DEAR
- Released: October 21, 2015 (Japan)
- Recorded: 2015
- Genre: J-pop
- Label: Johnny & Associates, J Storm

Hey! Say! JUMP singles chronology
"Chau#/我 I Need You" (2015)	"Kimi Attraction" (2015)	"Sayonara Sensation" (2016)

"Kimi Attraction" is a single by Hey! Say! JUMP. It was released on October 21, 2015.

The title song was chosen as the CM song for Kose Cosme Port's Softymo. It is described as a pop tune with a sense of speed about an intense love.

The single was released in three different versions: Regular Edition, Limited Edition 1, and Limited Edition 2. The limited editions contained a DVD including a PV and making footage.

== Regular Edition ==
CD

1. "Kimi Attraction"
2. "Shall We?"
3. "NEW AGE"
4. "Ignition"
5. "Kimi Attraction"（Original Karaoke）
6. "Shall We?"（Original Karaoke）
7. "NEW AGE"（Original Karaoke）
8. "Ignition"（Original Karaoke）

== Limited Edition 1 ==
CD

1. "Kimi Attraction"
2. "ChikuTaku"

DVD

1. "Kimi Attraction" (PV & Making of)

== Limited Edition 2 ==
CD

1. "Kimi Attraction"
2. "Aki、Hare。Boku ni Kaze ga Fuita。"

DVD

1. "Kimi Attraction" (PV & Making of) Dance Version
