= Hey! Say! =

Single by Hey! Say! 7
- Released: (Japan) August 1, 2007
- Recorded: 2007
- Genre: Japanese pop
- Label: J Storm, Johnny & Associates

Hey! Say! 7 singles chronology
"Hey! Say!" (2007)	""Ultra Music Power"" (2007)

"Hey! Say!" is the first single from the temporary group Hey! Say! 7, which later became Hey! Say! JUMP. The songs "Hey! Say!" and "BON BON" are both opening and ending themes for the anime Lovely Complex.

The single is released in two editions: limited and regular. The limited edition comes with a DVD that includes the promotional video and making of. However, the limited edition does not include instrumental or karaoke. The regular edition does, but does not come with a DVD.

== Regular edition ==
CD

1. "Hey! Say!"
2. "BON BON"
3. "I wo Kure (Iをくれ)"
4. "Hey! Say!" (Instrumental)
5. "BON BON" (Instrumental)
6. "I wo Kure (Iをくれ)" (Instrumental)

== Limited edition ==
CD

1. "Hey! Say!"
2. "BON BON"
3. "I wo Kure (Iをくれ)"
4. "Hey!Say!" (Instrumental)
5. "BON BON" (Instrumental)
6. "I wo Kure (Iをくれ)" (Instrumental)

DVD

1. "Hey! Say!" (PV & Making of)

== Performances ==
- 2007-07-13 - Music Station
- 2007-07-27 - Music Station
- 2007-08-01 - Music Station

== Charts ==
=== Oricon sales chart (Japan) ===
Release	Chart	Peak position	Debut sales	Sales total
August 1, 2007	Oricon Daily Singles Chart	2		
August 1, 2007	Oricon Weekly Singles Chart	1	126,000	185,105
August 1, 2007	Oricon Monthly Singles Chart	1		

=== Oricon Ranking (Monthly) ===
Month	8	9
Position	1	28
Sales	(161,761)	(23,344)
Total	161,761	185,105
