= Hitomi no Screen =

Single by Hey! Say! JUMP

from the album JUMP No. 1
- A-side: "Hitomi no Screen"
- B-side: "Kagayaki Days"; "Romeo & Juliet"
- Released: (Japan) February 24, 2010
- Recorded: 2010
- Genre: J-pop
- Label: J Storm, Johnny & Associates

Hey! Say! JUMP singles chronology
"Mayonaka no Shadow Boy" (2008)	"Hitomi no Screen" (2010)	"Arigatō (Sekai no Doko ni Ite mo)" (2010)

"Hitomi no Screen" is a single by Hey! Say! JUMP, released on February 24, 2010. The single debuted at No. 1 on the Oricon weekly charts.

== Information ==
"Hitomi no Screen" was used as the theme song for the drama Hidarime Tantei EYE starring Hey! Say! JUMP member Ryosuke Yamada, Kanjani Eight's Yu Yokoyama, and actress Satomi Ishihara.

Hey! Say! 7's "Kagayaki Days" is also included in the single. Both limited edition and regular edition are released. The limited edition includes a DVD of the Promotional Video of "Hitomi no Screen" and making. The regular edition includes a song called "Romeo & Juliet", which is not in the limited edition, and three karaoke songs.

== Regular Edition ==
CD

1. "Hitomi no Screen"
2. "Kagayaki Days" - Hey! Say! 7
3. "Romeo & Juliet"
4. "Hitomi no Screen" (Original Karaoke)
5. "Kagayaki Days" (Original Karaoke) - Hey! Say! 7
6. "Romeo & Juliet" (Original Karaoke)

== Limited Edition ==
CD

1. "Hitomi no Screen"
2. "Kagayaki Days" - Hey! Say! 7

DVD

1. "Hitomi no Screen" (PV & Making of)

== Charts and certifications ==
=== Oricon sales chart (Japan) ===
Release	Chart	Peak position	Debut sales	Sales total
February 24, 2010	Oricon Daily Singles Chart	1		
February 24, 2010	Oricon Weekly Singles Chart	1	201,000	248,058
February 24, 2010	Oricon Monthly Singles Chart	3		
February 24, 2010	Oricon Yearly Singles Chart	21		250,206

=== Sales and certifications ===
Country	Provider	Sales	Certification
Japan	RIAJ	250,206	Platinum
