= Maji Sunshine =

"Maji SUNSHINE"

Single by Hey! Say! JUMP
- Released: May 11, 2016 (Japan)
- Recorded: 2016
- Genre: J-pop
- Label: Johnny & Associates, J Storm

Hey! Say! JUMP singles chronology
| "Sayonara Sensation" (2016) | "Maji SUNSHINE" (2016) | "Fantastic Time" (2016) |

"Maji SUNSHINE" is a single by Hey! Say! JUMP. It was released on May 11, 2016. The title song was picked up as the CM song for Kose Cosmeport's Sun Cut. It's a summer song that describes the feelings of a boy in love.

The Regular Edition contains "We are Otokonoko!", which is the ending theme for TV Tokyo's Little Tokyo Life, a new song titled "Eve", and the original karaoke version for each song.

The Limited Edition 1 contained junior sub-group Hey! Say! 7's new song "Party Monster", and the DVD includes the PV and making-of for "Maji SUNSHINE". Meanwhile, the Limited Edition 2 contains sub-group Hey! Say! BEST's "Speed It Up", and its DVD includes a special footage called "Dai-2-kai Jan Jan Oshiete!! Jan! Jan! JUMQ".

== Regular Edition ==
CD

1. "Maji SUNSHINE"
2. "We are Otokonoko!"
3. "Eve"
4. "Maji SUNSHINE" (Original Karaoke)
5. "We are Otokonoko!" (Original Karaoke)
6. "Eve" (Original Karaoke)

== Limited Edition 1 ==
CD

1. "Maji SUNSHINE"
2. "Party Monster" - Hey! Say! 7

DVD

1. "Maji SUNSHINE" (PV & Making of)

== Limited Edition 2 ==
CD

1. "Maji SUNSHINE"
2. "Speed It Up" - Hey! Say! BEST

DVD

1. Special Footage Dai-2-kai Jan Jan Oshiete!! Jan! Jan! JUMQ
