= Ultra Music Power =

Single by Hey! Say! JUMP

from the album JUMP No. 1
- B-side: "Star Time", "Too Shy"
- Released: November 14, 2007
- Recorded: 2007
- Genre: J-pop
- Length: 8 min 5 sec (Limited Edition); 24 min 19 sec (Regular First Press Edition); 16 min 10 sec (Regular Edition)
- Label: J Storm, Johnny & Associates

Hey! Say! JUMP singles chronology
"Hey! Say!" (2007)	"Ultra Music Power" (2007)	"Dreams Come True" (2008)

"Ultra Music Power" is Hey! Say! JUMP's debut single, but their second single overall. It was released from J Storm on November 14, 2007.

== Background and release ==
After V6, Arashi, and NEWS in the Johnny & Associates, Hey! Say! JUMP became the special supporters of FIVB Volleyball Men's World Cup. This single's title song "Ultra Music Power" is 2007 FIVB Women's World Cup and 2007 FIVB Men's World Cup's image song.

On October 12, 2023, Hey! Say! JUMP announced through their fan club that they would no longer be performing the song in the wake of Johnny Kitagawa's sexual abuse scandals, citing the line, "J! Johnny's!" as the reason.

== Track listing ==
=== Limited edition ===
CD

1. "Ultra Music Power"
2. "Star Time"

DVD

1. "Ultra Music Power" (PV and Making of)

=== Regular first press edition ===
CD

1. "Ultra Music Power"
2. "Star Time"
3. "Too Shy"
4. "Ultra Music Power" (Original Karaoke)
5. "Star Time" (Original Karaoke)
6. "Too Shy" (Original Karaoke)

=== Regular edition ===
CD

1. "Ultra Music Power"
2. "Star Time"
3. "Ultra Music Power" (Original Karaoke)
4. "Star Time" (Original Karaoke)

== Chart ==
Chart (2007)	Peak position
Oricon Weekly Chart	1
Oricon November 2007 Monthly Chart	3
Oricon 2007 Yearly Chart	14
Oricon 2008 Yearly Chart	135

== Certifications ==
Country	Provider	Certification
Japan	RIAJ	Platinum
