= Kei Inoo =

Japanese singer and actor (born 1990)

Kei Inoo 伊野尾 慧
- Born: June 22, 1990 (age 36)
- Origin: Saitama Prefecture, Japan
- Genres: J-pop
- Occupations: Singer; actor
- Years active: 2001–present
- Labels: Starto Entertainment, Storm Labels

Kei Inoo (伊野尾 慧, Inoo Kei; born June 22, 1990) is a Japanese singer, actor, and member of Hey! Say! JUMP. He is under the management of Starto Entertainment. He was born in Saitama Prefecture.

On September 23, 2001, he entered Johnny & Associates as a trainee. He later became a member of the Johnny's Jr. group J.J. Express. In 2007, he debuted as a member of Hey! Say! JUMP. He graduated from Meiji University with a degree in architecture in 2013. He plays the keyboard during the group's live shows.

== Career ==
He joined Johnny & Associates as a Johnny's Jr. He appeared regularly on the show, Ya-Ya-yah, as well as J&A show, Shounen Club. He later became a part of the Johnny's Jr. group, J.J. Express with Yuya Takaki, Daiki Arioka, and Yuto Nakajima. He debuted on September 24, 2007, as a member of Hey! Say! JUMP.

Since then, Inoo has been cast in numerous dramas and became a frequent guest on Tensai! Shimura Dobutsuen and a regular on Mezamashi TV. He also appeared on the Saturday afternoon variety show, Meringue no Kimochi.

He was cast as the main role in the live-action movie adaptation of the manga Peach Girl as Okayasu Kairi which was released in 2017 and marked his film debut.

== Personal life ==
He has a second-class small boat pilot license and a scuba diving license. Inoo graduated from the Department of Architecture, Faculty of Science and Engineering, Meiji University in 2013.

Inoo is distantly related to Jesse of SixTONES, who is also under Starto Entertainment.

== Filmography ==
=== Film ===
Year	Title	Role	Notes	Ref.
2017	Peach Girl	Okayasu Kairi	Lead role	

=== Television drama ===
Year	Title	Role	Notes	Ref.
2025	Parallel Couple: The Truth Behind Our Death	Kanta Namikawa	Lead role	
2025–26	Strobe Edge	Kyoichi Miyoshi	2 seasons	

=== Other television ===
Year	Title	Notes	Ref.
2016–22	Mezamashi TV	Thursday MC	
