= Keito Okamoto =

- Born: April 1, 1993 (age 33)
- Origin: Tokyo, Japan
- Genres: J-pop
- Occupations: Singer; actor; television personality
- Instrument: Vocals
- Years active: 2006–present
- Labels: Johnny & Associates; J Storm
- Formerly of: Hey! Say! JUMP; Hey! Say! 7

Keito Okamoto (岡本 圭人, Okamoto, Keito; born April 1, 1993) is a Japanese singer and actor associated with Starto Entertainment (formerly of Johnny & Associates). Former member of Hey! Say! JUMP.

== Early life ==
Okamoto was born in Tokyo to Kenichi Okamoto, a former member of the rock band Otokogumi, and model Katsue Nishi. He was educated at Framlingham College in England before returning to the Tokyo Metropolitan Area.

== Career ==
In October 2006, he started work with the Johnny & Associates talent agency as a Johnny's Jr. On September 21, 2007, he debuted as a member of Hey! Say! JUMP. While he was a member, he wrote the lyrics to the song "Hero" and composed the song "H.our Time." He, occasionally, plays guitar along with Kota Yabu and Hikaru Yaotome in their concerts.

In March 2011, Okamoto made his acting debut in the final episode of long-running drama Kinpachi Sensei as a delinquent student.

In June 2018, following the announcement of Hey! Say! JUMP's single, "Cosmic Human", Okamoto announced that he was taking a break from entertainment to study abroad at the American Academy of Dramatic Arts (AADA) in New York City, beginning in September. He graduated with an associate’s degree in acting from AADA in June 2020.

In April 2021, Okamoto announce he would leave the group to pursue an acting career, remaining as part of the agency.

== Personal life ==
Okamoto enrolled in Sophia University in 2012, but he revealed in 2018 that he dropped out.

== Filmography ==
=== TV drama ===
- Kinpachi-sensei Final SP(March 27, 2011)
- First Class Season 2
- Rhythm (July 4, 2023)

=== Variety shows ===
- Shounen Club
- Hyakushiki
- YanYan JUMP (April 2011)
- Itadaki High JUMP

=== TV appearances ===
For Hey! Say! JUMP-related appearances, please see Hey! Say! JUMP.

- School Kakumei
  - 「今からでも遅くない！？英会話のススメ」as Guest Teacher (20150201)
  - 「話せないのは時代遅れ？！英会話のススメ」as Guest Teacher
  - 「今からでも遅くない！？英会話のススメ」as Guest Teacher (20160117)
  - 「今からでも遅くない！？英会話のススメ」as Guest Teacher (20160612)
  - 「今からでも遅くない！？英会話のススメ」as Guest Teacher (20161211)

=== TV commercials/advertisements ===
- Deca Sports – Wii
- LOTTE Ghana (2009)
- LOTTE Plus X Fruitio (2010)
- LOTTE Fruitio Squash
- Vermount Curry (2013)
