= Hikaru Yaotome =

Hikaru Yaotome 八乙女 光
- Born: December 2, 1990 (age 35)
- Origin: Miyagi Prefecture, Japan
- Genres: J-pop
- Occupations: Singer; tarento; actor
- Instrument: Vocals
- Years active: 2002–present
- Labels: Starto Entertainment, Storm Labels
- Member of: Hey! Say! JUMP, Hey! Say! BEST, Ya-Ya-yah
- Spouse: Unknown (m. 2024)

Hikaru Yaotome (八乙女 光, Yaotome, Hikaru; born December 2, 1990) is a Japanese singer, actor, and tarento. He is a member of Hey! Say! JUMP under Starto Entertainment. He was born in Miyagi Prefecture.

On December 1, 2002, he entered Johnny & Associates as a trainee. Later, he was put in the junior group Ya-Ya-yah and became the secondary lead vocalist after Kota Yabu. On September 21, 2007, he debuted and began performing as a member of Hey! Say! JUMP. In 2009, he graduated from Horikoshi High School alongside Taiyo Ayukawa and actress Saki Fukuda.

He plays bass guitar in their concerts and even displayed talents in composing and lyrics writing on their first studio album JUMP No. 1.

== Personal life ==
On August 12, 2024, Yaotome announced his marriage to a non-celebrity woman via Nippon Television Live.

== Discography ==
=== Solo ===
- "Akogare no Egoist"
- "Gentles"
- "Flame of Love"
- "1000 Lights"
- "Tears and Smile" (Duet with Kota Yabu – Lyrics by Yabu; Composition by Hikaru)
- "Original Iro" (Duet with Yabu)
- "Score" (Hey! Say! BEST song – Lyrics by Yabu; Rap by Hikaru)
- "Infinity" (Lyrics by Hikaru)
- "Ima Susumuo"
- "Ai☆Scream" (Composed and written by Hikaru)
- "Thumb and Pinky" (Lyrics Hikaru)
- "Perfect Life" (Lyrics Hikaru)

=== Concerts ===
- KinKi Kids Dome Concert: Fun Fan Forever (December 31, 2002 – January 1, 2003)
- Johnny's Starship Count Down (December 31, 2002 – January 1, 2003)
- KinKi Kids 24/7 G Tour (December 31, 2002 – January 1, 2003)
- 2003 Concert Tour To be, To be, Ten made Ten made To be (March 29 – May 5, 2003)
- Kotoshi mo Ah Taihen Thank U Natsu (August 8–28, 2003)
- KAT-TUN no Daibouken de Show (August 12–20, 2003)
- NEWS Taiwan Concert (October 10, 2003)
- A Happy NEWS Year 2004 (January 1–4, 2004)
- 2004 Concert Tour TackeyTsuba 22sai Kon (July 4, 2004)
- Johnny's Theater "Summary" of Johnnys World (August 8–29, 2004)
- Tsubasa Con (August 18–25, 2004)
- Shinen so-soh Kinpachi Trio Ya-Ya-yah Concert (January 2, 2005)
- Ya-Ya-yah Haruyasumi Yokohama Arena Concert (March 26, 2005)
- Johnny's Theater Summary Digest 2005 (July 29 – September 4, 2005)
- Johnny's Junior no Daibouken! (August 15–26, 2006)
- Youtachi no Ongaku Daiundokai (September 30 – October 1, 2006)
- 2007nen Kingashinnen Akemashite Omedetou Johnny's Jr. Daishugou (January 1–7, 2007)
- Johnny's Jr.no Daibouken! @Meridian (August 15–24, 2007)
- Johnny'S Jr. Hey Say '07 in Tokyo Dome (September 23–24, 2007)

== Filmography ==
=== Dramas ===
- 3nen BGumi Kinpachi Sensei 7th Series (October 2004 – March 2005) as Maruyama Shu
- 3nen BGumi Kinpachi Sensei 7th Series Ma no Saishuukai Special (December 30, 2005) as Maruyama Shu
- Orthros no Inu (TBS, 2009) as Kumakiri Masaru
- 3nen BGumi Kinpachi Sensei Final as Maruyama Shu (March 2011)
- He is Beautiful (TBS, July 2011) as Hongo Yuuki
- 37-sai de Isha ni Natta Boku: Kenshui Junjo Monogatari (Fuji TV, 2012) as Kentaro Shimoda
- Dark System Koi no Ouza Ketteisen (TBS, 2014)
- Do S Deka as Sōichirō Hamada (NTV, 2015)
- Koshoku Robot (NTV, 2017) as Ottori

=== Variety shows ===
- The Shōnen Club (2003–present)
- Ya-Ya-yah (January 2003 – October 2007)
- Hyakushiki (2007–2008)
- Hi! Hey! Say! (November 2007–present)
- School Kakumei! (April 2009–present, NTV)
- YY JUMPing (October 2009–present)
- Yan Yan JUMP (April 2011–present)
- Hirunandesu! (2014–present)
- Itadaki High JUMP (2015–present, Fuji TV)

=== TV appearances ===
- Gurunai (with Daiki Arioka, NTV, August 5, 2010)
- Waratte Iitomo! (with Kota Yabu and Daiki Arioka, Fuji TV, December 15, 2010)
- Merengue no Kimochi (NTV, December 18, 2010)
- Unlucky Laboratory (NTV, January 4, 2011)
- Otameshika program (December 26, 2011)
- SMAP x SMAP (June 4, 2012)

=== Theatre ===
- Stand by Me (July 25 – August 10, 2003)
- Stand by Me (July 16 – August 1, 2004)
- DREAM BOYS

=== TV Commercials / Advertisements ===
- Pizza-la Super Bingo Hen (2003)
- Maruchan Akai Kitsune no Tanuki (TU→YU)
- Maruchan Akai Kitsune no Tanuki
- Deca Sports – Wii (2009)
- OZACK
