= Daiki Arioka =

Japanese singer, actor, tarento and model (born 1991)

Daiki Arioka 有岡 大貴
- Born: April 15, 1991 (age 35)
- Origin: Chiba Prefecture, Japan
- Genres: J-pop; R&B; Electropop; Dance-pop; Electronic; Hip hop; Dance; Electronic dance
- Occupations: Singer; actor; tarento; model
- Instrument: Vocals
- Years active: 2000–present
- Labels: Starto Entertainment, Storm Labels
- Member of: Hey! Say! JUMP; Hey! Say! BEST
- Formerly of: JJ Express; Hey! Say! 7

Daiki Arioka (有岡 大貴, Arioka Daiki; born April 15, 1991) is a Japanese singer, actor, tarento, and model as well as member of Hey! Say! JUMP. He is under the management of Starto Entertainment.

== Career ==
On June 2, 2003, he joined Johnny & Associates as a trainee. As a Johnny's Jr., he was a member of J.J.Express. However, before he became a part of Johnny & Associates, he was a member of Junes Project.

When he was 14 in 2005, he played Toru Sonobe in the drama Engine with his Johnny's senior Takuya Kimura of SMAP.

On April 3, 2007, he joined the temporary group Hey! Say! 7, with soon to be fellow members of Hey! Say! JUMP, Yuya Takaki, Ryosuke Yamada, Yuto Nakajima and Yuri Chinen, starting with a public performance at KAT-TUN's 2007 Cartoon KAT-TUN II You concert.

On September 21, 2007, he began performing as a member of Hey! Say! JUMP.

In October 2008, he acted in the drama Sensei wa Erai! as Rin Takekura, along with other Hey! Say! JUMP members; Ryosuke Yamada, Yuto Nakajima and Yuri Chinen.

In the same year, he was in the drama called Scrap Teacher: Kyoushi Saisei, as Sugizō Irie. With the Hey! Say! JUMP members that played alongside him in Sensei wa Erai!.

== Personal life ==
On June 7, 2024, Arioka announced his marriage to actress Mayu Matsuoka.

== Discography ==
=== Songs ===
- "Kimi to Boku no Future"
- "Time" (Lyrics by Yuya Takaki; Arranged by Daiki)
- "RELOAD" (Lyrics by Daiki)
- "Sakura Saita yo" (Rap Lyrics by Daiki)
- "UNION" (Lyrics by Kota Yabu, Hikaru Yaotome and Daiki)

=== Concerts ===
For Hey! Say! JUMP or Hey! Say! BEST-related concerts, please see Hey! Say! JUMP.

== Filmography ==
=== Self ===
- Itadaki High JUMP

=== Movies ===
- Jam Films 2: Fastener (2004)
- Innocent Curse (2017) as Ezaki Shunya
- Code Blue the Movie (2018) as Souma Natori
- Shin Ultraman (2022) as Akihisa Taki

=== Drama ===
- Hyakujuu Sentai Gaoranger (TV Asahi, 2001) as Futaro
- Saigo no Bengonin (NTV, 2003, ep2)
- Engine (TV series) (Fuji TV, 2005) as Tōru Sonobe
- Sensei wa Erai! (NTV, 2008) as Rin Takekura
- Scrap Teacher (NTV, 2008) as Sugizō Irie
- Chūshingura Sono Gi Sono Ai (TV Tokyo, 2012) as Ōishi Chikara
- Kindaichi Shounen no Jikenbo: Hong Kong Kowloon Zaiho Satsujin Jiken (NTV, 2013) as Ryūji Saki
- Kindaichi Shounen no Jikenbo: Gokumon Juku Satsujin Jiken (NTV, 2014) as Ryūji Saki
- Kindaichi Shounen no Jikenbo Neo (NTV, 2014) as Ryūji Saki
- Okitegami Kyōko no Bibōroku (NTV, 2015) as Nuru Narikawa
- Code Blue 3 (Fuji TV, 2017) as Natori Souma
- Koshoku Robot (NTV, 2017) as Mujaki
- Invisible (TBS, 2022) as Kiyoshi Isogaya

== Awards ==
Year	Award	Category	Work(s)	Result	Ref
2023	46th Japan Academy Film Prize	Newcomer of the Year	Shin Ultraman	Won	
