= Lark (disambiguation) =

A lark is a small terrestrial bird.

Lark, The Lark, Larks or The Larks may also refer to:

== Geography ==
- Lark, Utah, United States, a ghost town
- Lark, Wisconsin, United States, an unincorporated community
- Lark Street, Albany, New York, United States
- River Lark, a river in England
- Lark Lane, Liverpool, England
- Lark Wood, a biological Site of Special Scientific Interest in Gloucestershire, England
- Lark or Larak Island, in the Persian Gulf off the coast of Iran

== Arts and entertainment ==
=== Music ===
- The Larks, an influential American vocal group active in the 1950s
- Lark (band), an electronica band from South Africa
- "The Lark", nickname given to String Quartet No. 53 in D major, Op. 64, No. 5, by Joseph Haydn
- "The Lark", composed by Mikhail Glinka
- "The Lark" or "Ciocârlia", composed by Angheluş Dinicu
- "The Lark Ascending", composed by Ralph Vaughan Williams
- "Lark", a song by Angel Olsen from the 2019 album All Mirrors
- Lark (album), a 1972 album by Linda Lewis
- Alouette (song), Quebecois children's song whose title translates to "Lark"

=== Films ===
- The Lark (1958 film), an Australian TV adaptation of Jean Anouilh's play (see below)
- The Lark (1964 film), a Soviet film
- The Lark (2007 film), a British film

=== Fictional characters ===
- John Lark, a character in the Mission: Impossible – Fallout
- Miss Lark, a recurring character in the Mary Poppins book series
- Lady Lark, a Marvel Comics character
- Lark, from the PlayStation 2 game Devil Kings
- Lark, from the Nintendo 64 game Pilotwings 64
- Lark, a main character from Milo

=== Plays ===
- The Lark (play), a 1952 play about Joan of Arc by Jean Anouilh

== In the military ==
- HMS Lark, sixteen Royal Navy ships
- Hired armed lugger Lark, used by the Royal Navy from 1799 to 1801
- USS Lark, two US Navy ships
- CSS Lark, a Confederate paddle steamer and blockade runner during the American Civil War
- SAM-N-2 Lark, an early U.S. Navy anti-aircraft missile
- Lark (Norwegian resistance), a Second World War group sent into German-occupied Norway to prepare for a possible Allied invasion

== Transportation ==
- Studebaker Lark, a compact car built by Studebaker in the 1950s and early 1960s
- Lark (passenger train), a passenger train operated by the Southern Pacific Railroad
- Lark, a South Devon Railway 0-4-0 steam locomotive
- Curtiss Model 41 Lark, a commercial biplane introduced in 1925
- Keleher Lark, a single-seat aerobatic sport aircraft designed in the early 1960s
- Lark (dinghy), a two-person racing dinghy
- MV Larks, a former name of the ferry MV Lucky Star (1976)

== Sports ==
- Denver Larks, a former name of the Denver Nuggets National Basketball Association team
- Larks, a nickname for the Montreal Alouettes Canadian Football League team
- Hays Larks, a collegiate summer baseball team in Hays, Kansas
- Jersey Larks, a professional ice hockey team which played in the Eastern Hockey League during the 1960–61 season
- Oakland Larks, a baseball team in the West Coast Negro Baseball League in 1946
- Mynavi ABC Championship, a Japan Golf Tour event called the ABC Lark Cup (1988–1991) and the Lark Cup (1992–1993)

== People ==
- Lark (name), a list of people with either the surname or given name
- Lark (person), someone who prefers to get up early in the morning and go to bed in the early evening
- Sarah Lark, a pen name of German author Christiane Gohl (born 1958)
- Lark O'Neal, a pen name of American novelist Barbara O'Neal (fl. 1990-present)
- K. Gordon Lark, American biologist

== Other uses ==
- Lark (cigarette), a brand of cigarette made by Philip Morris
- Lark Theater, a single-screen Art Deco cinema in Larkspur, California, United States
- Lark Health, American digital health company
- Lark Hotels, an American hotel management and development company
- Lark, an XML syntax analyzer written by Tim Bray
- Colloquial for a larrikin act
- Lark (software), collaborative software
- The Lark (theater), a New York-based new play theater organization
- Lark (restaurant), a restaurant in Seattle

== See also ==
- Lark Force, a Second World War Australian Army unit
- SAI KZ VII Lærke (Danish for "Lark"), a light utility aircraft first flown in 1946
- "An Awhesyth" (Cornish for "The Lark"), a traditional Cornish folk song
- Alouette (disambiguation) (French for "lark")
- LARC (disambiguation)
