= Skylark (disambiguation) =

Skylark is a genus of birds, including its type species, the European skylark.

== Aircraft ==
- Cessna 175 Skylark, an American aircraft design
- Dova DV-1 Skylark, a Czech ultralight aircraft
- Skylark (rocket), a British sounding rocket first launched in 1957
- Skylark (UAV), a miniature unmanned aerial vehicle developed by Elbit
- Slingsby Skylark, first of a series of British gliders produced in the 1950s and 1960s
  - Slingsby T.41 Skylark 2
  - Slingsby Skylark 3
  - Slingsby Skylark 4
- Robertson Skylark SRX-1, a mid-1950s STOL aircraft
- Vortech Skylark, an American helicopter design

== Books ==
- Skylark (novel), the sequel to Sarah, Plain and Tall by Patricia MacLachlan
- Skylark, the English translation of Pacsirta, a novel by Hungarian author Dezső Kosztolányi
- Skylark (publisher), an imprint of Bantam Books
- Skylark (series), a series of four novels by E. E. Smith, featuring a spaceship called Skylark
- To a Skylark, an 1820 poem by Percy Bysshe Shelley

== Film ==
- Dave Skylark, host of Skylark Tonight in the 2014 action-comedy The Interview, played by James Franco
- Skylark (1934 film), a French comedy starring Fernandel and Noël-Noël
- Skylark (1941 film), an American comedy starring Claudette Colbert and Ray Milland
- Skylark (1993 film), starring Glenn Close and Christopher Walken, a sequel to Sarah, Plain and Tall
- Sky Larks, a 1934 Walter Lantz animated short starring Oswald the Lucky Rabbit

== Music ==
- Skylark (American musician) (active 1995–2010), bass player and singer for The Doobie Brothers
- Skylark (Canadian band), best known for their 1973 hit song "Wildflower"
- Skylark (Italian band), a power metal band
- "Skylark" (song), a 1942 jazz standard written by Johnny Mercer and Hoagy Carmichael
- Skylark (Paul Desmond album), 1973
- Skylark (Shirley Scott album), 1991
- Skylark (George Cables album), 1996

== Vehicles ==
- Buick Skylark, an American automobile (1953–1998)
- Hupp Skylark, an American automobile (1939–40)

== Other ==
- Skylark Group, a North Indian poultry company
- Skylark Holdings, a Japanese company
- Skylark, a 1929 aviation comic strip by Elmer Woggon
- USS Skylark
- Skylark (radio station), a community radio station in Devon
- Noah and Nelly in... SkylArk, a series of short animated children's programmes
- Skylark, a comic book character originally known as Lady Lark
- Team Skylark, a fictional all-female French racing team in the animated series Immortal Grand Prix
- The unofficial name of the Edward E. Smith Memorial Award in science fiction
- Chip Skylark, a character in The Fairly OddParents
- Starlark, formerly Skylark, a programming language

== See also ==
- Skylarking (disambiguation)
- Sky Larkin, a UK indie rock band
- Alouette (disambiguation), the French word for skylark
