= Clock Software =

Software company developing hotel management systems

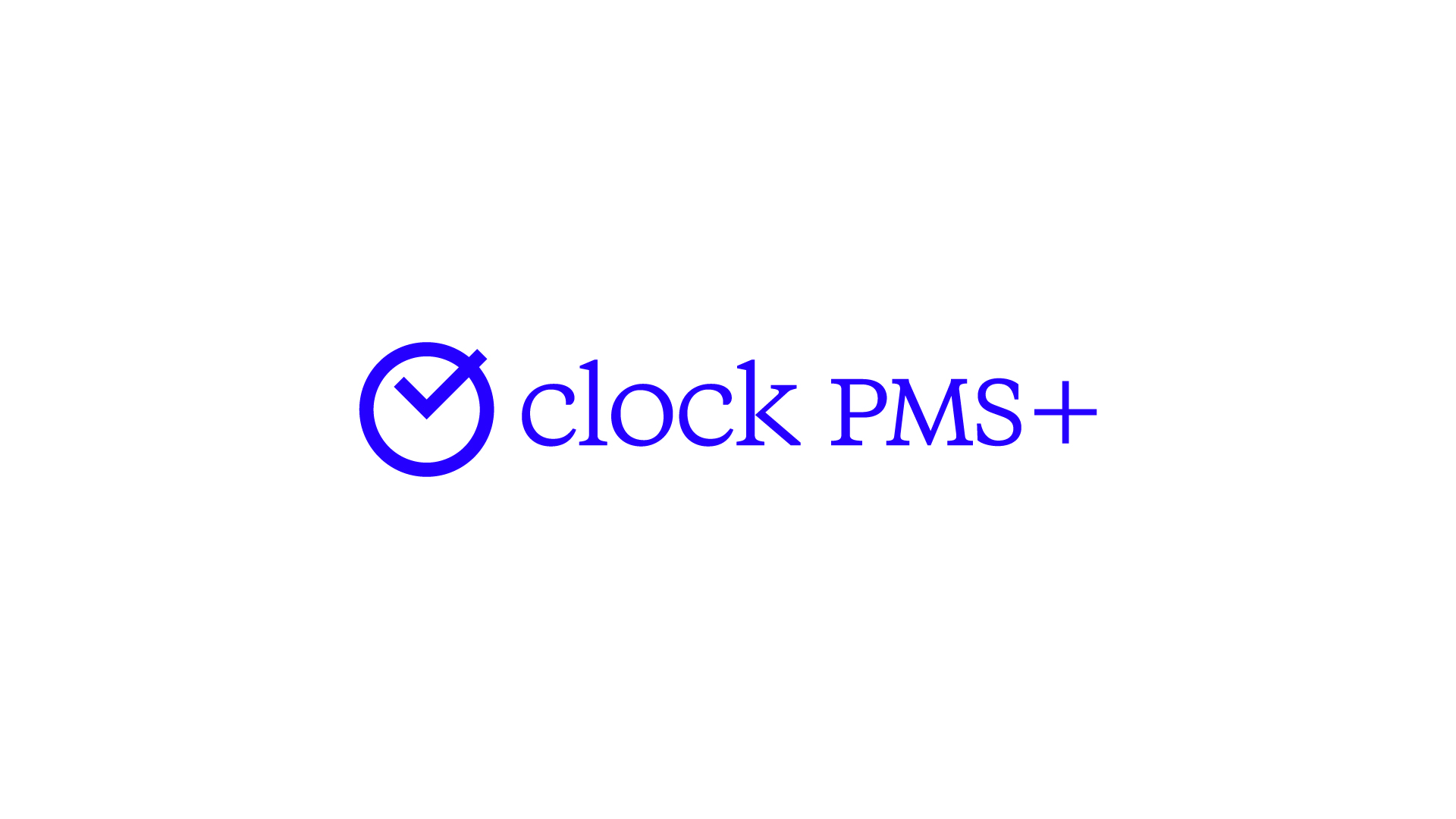
- Clock PMS+ logo
- Type: Limited Company
- Industry: Software Development
- Founded: 1994
- Founders: Krasimir Trapchev, Rosen Kostov, Diana Trapcheva, Georgi Georgiev
- Headquarters: London, United Kingdom
- Number of locations: United Kingdom, Bulgaria
- Area served: Global
- Products: Property management system
- Brands: Clock PMS+
- Number of employees: 50+
- Parent: Klok OOD
- Website: www.clock-software.com

Clock Software is a private limited company developing software and hardware for the hospitality industry - property management system, restaurant point of sale, online booking engine, channel manager, self-service kiosk, mobile hotel app. Its headquarters is in London, UK.

== History ==
Clock Software was incorporated in 1994 in Varna, Bulgaria, under the name Clock Ltd (Клок ООД). Initially, the company specialized in selling hardware and peripherals but soon switched its focus to the development of hotel software. In 1996, Clock launched their first property management system called ClockFront for Windows. At the time, a huge privatisation was going on as part of the transition of the country to democracy and market economy. All hotels previously owned by the state were changing ownership and needed new software to replace previous, often centralised, management systems. Clock Software offered their software to these newly privatised hotels.

In 2006, Clock Software started to expand to countries outside Bulgaria and opened offices in Romania (2007) and Croatia (2008). The first markets where their products were adopted were Romania, Macedonia and Croatia.

In 2010, Clock launched their efforts into creating a hospitality software suite based on cloud technology. The new product consolidated separate applications into one cloud-based platform and switched from a data-focused to guest-centred software model. A new branch was registered in London, UK under the name of Clock Software Ltd. to take over the international development and the distribution of the cloud-based software products, while the Bulgarian branch remained in charge of software development and support.

Clock Software launched their first cloud product, the free Internet reservation system InnHand, in 2012. In 2013, it launched the hotel management platform Clock PMS+. A year later InnHand was discontinued and the company focused entirely on the new system. In 2016, the company released its first hardware device, a self-service kiosk.

== Distribution ==
Its Windows-based installable software Clock Software offers in Eastern Europe, while the latest cloud-based hotel management platform, Clock PMS+, is available globally. Clock PMS+ has customers in 65+ countries (as of the end of 2018) with Lark Hotels and McMillan Hotels among them. In 2015, Clock PMS+ was featured in the annual report by Software Advice "Frontrunners Report for Hotel Management System - 2018" and in 2016, Clock Software was included in the Grant Thornton's report "Emerging clouds in hotel technology | Spotlight on cloud-based PMS"

Clock PMS+ is a property management system delivered as SaaS. It is hosted on Amazon Web Services (AWS) and is a certified partner of various third party providers: payment gateways - PayPal, Authorize.Net, Worldpay, Adyen; channel managers - and Yield Planet; door lock systems - ASSA ABLOY, hotel meta search websites - TripConnect by Tripadvisor.
