= JUMP World =

Studio album by Hey! Say! JUMP
- Released: June 6, 2012 (Japan)
- Recorded: 2012
- Genre: J-pop
- Label: J Storm, Johnny & Associates
- Producer: Julie K.

Hey! Say! JUMP chronology
JUMP No. 1 (2010)	JUMP World (2012)	S3ART (2014)

Singles from JUMP World
- 1. ""Arigatō" (Sekai no Doko ni Itemo)" Released: December 15, 2010; 2. "OVER" Released: May 29, 2011; 3. "Magic Power" Released: September 21, 2011; 4. "SUPER DELICATE" Released: February 22, 2012

JUMP World is the second studio album by Hey! Say! JUMP. It was released in Japan on June 6, 2012, under the group's labels: Johnny & Associates and J Storm. The album was certified Gold by the Recording Industry Association of Japan for shipping of 100,000+ copies.

== Information ==
After almost 2 years since Hey! Say! JUMP's first album JUMP No. 1 was released, it was announced that the group would be releasing their second album on June 6, 2012. The album would contain their singles from "Arigatō (Sekai no Doko ni Ite mo)" to "SUPER DELICATE". The album would be released on two different versions: a Regular Edition, which contains a 3D Jacket and 40-page booklet, and a Limited Edition, which contains a DVD, a changeable jacket, and a 40-page booklet. This also marks their first album without Ryutaro Morimoto after his suspension.

== Promotion ==
On May 25, TV Asahi's Music Station revealed their artist line-up for the June 1st episode. This is where Hey! Say! JUMP started the album promotion. They performed a special medley of "Arigatō (Sekai no Doko ni Ite mo)", "Boku wa Vampire", and "SUPER DELICATE". The group also appeared on NHK's Music Japan on June 3, 2012. They also performed their title song, "Boku wa Vampire" on Ichiban Song Show and The Shonen Club.

== Songs ==
All the singles that they released after JUMP No. 1 were included on the album. These are "OVER" and "Arigatō (Sekai no Doko ni Ite mo)" which were the last two singles in which Morimoto participated. "Magic Power" was used as the theme song for the Japanese dubbed movie The Smurfs. "SUPER DELICATE" was the theme song of the TV comedy Risou no Musuko, in which members Ryosuke Yamada and Yuto Nakajima were lead cast.

"Boku wa Vampire" was the title song of the album. The song "Hana Egao" was used for Yuri Chinen's romantic comedy TV series, Sprout.

== Regular Edition ==
1. "Perfect Life"
2. "SUPER DELICATE"
3. "Tsunagu Te to Te"
4. "Boku wa Vampire"
5. "OVER"
6. "Hero"
7. "Magic Power"
8. "Hurry up!"
9. "Sam & Pinky"
10. "Arigatō (Sekai no Doko ni Ite mo)"
11. "Together Forever"
12. "Snap" - Hey! Say! BEST
13. "Hana Egao" - Hey! Say! 7
14. "Single Medley Second Act"

Message from Members of Hey! Say! JUMP

== Charts and certifications ==
=== Charts ===
Chart (2012)	Peak position
Japan Oricon Daily Album Chart	1
Japan Oricon Weekly Album Chart	1
Japan Oricon Monthly Album Chart	2
Japan Oricon Yearly Album Chart	36

=== Sales and certifications ===
Country	Provider	Sales	Certification
Japan	RIAJ	153,473	Gold

== Release ==
Region	Date	Format	Labels
Japan	June 6, 2012	CD; CD+DVD	J Storm
Hong Kong	June 29, 2012	CD; CD+DVD	Avex Asia Limited
