= Jonathan's =

Restaurant chain in Japan

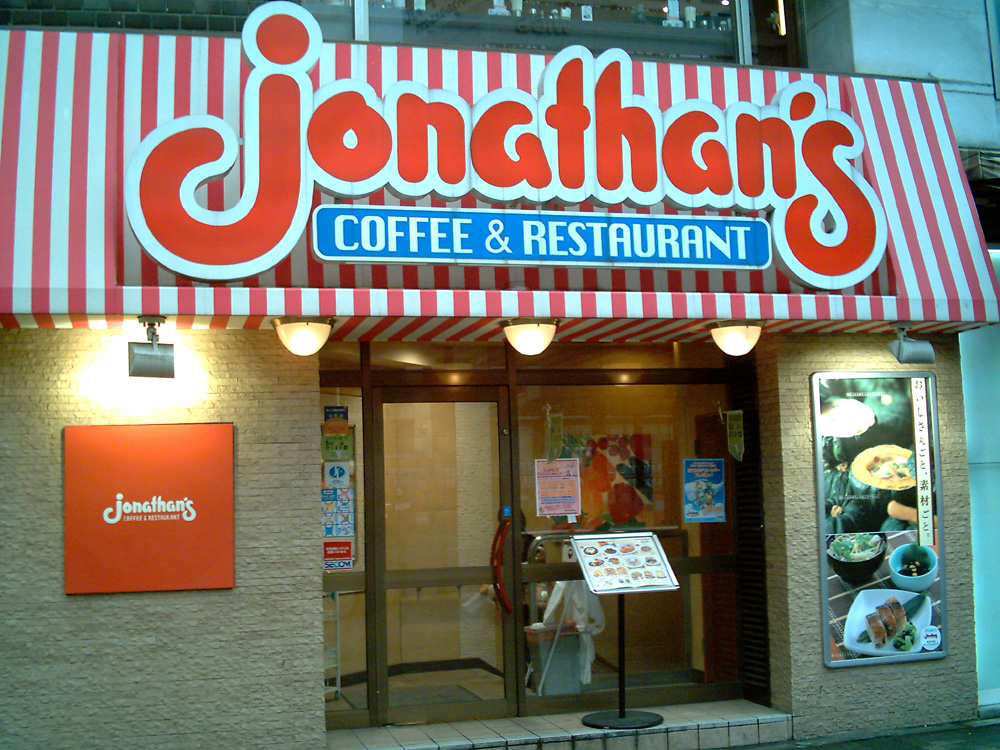
The front of the restaurant

Jonathan's (Japanese: ジョナサン) is a restaurant chain in Japan. The chain is a family-oriented business that serves both American and Japanese cuisine. Jonathan's is owned by Skylark Holdings.

== History ==
The first restaurant was opened in 1980. The original plan was for it to sell coffee and snacks, but it ended up becoming a family style restaurant. The first restaurant was opened in Nerima, Tokyo. In 1986, they offered an IPO and by 1987, had 100 locations. They opened their 200th location in 1997 and then opened their 300th location in 2000, but currently have around 274 locations. They have over 20 locations in Tokyo, Osaka, Kanagawa, Saitama and Nagano.

== Description ==
Jonathan's offers dine-in, takeout and home delivery options. The restaurant features breakfast, lunch and dinner items ranging from pizza, wine, pancakes, seafood, beef and parfait.

Jonathan's offers free wi-fi and charging stations. It allows customers to order via touchscreen.

Jonathan's has also banned smoking inside of the restaurant. Some locations of the restaurant are open 24 hours a day.

== In popular culture ==
The restaurant was featured on TV Tokyo's Dekamori Hunter television show in 2020.

A restaurant modeled on a Jonathan's location (changed to "Jonny's") appears in the anime series Toradora!.
