= HMS Lark =

Sixteen ships of the Royal Navy have borne the name HMS Lark or HMS Larke, after the bird, the lark:

- HMS Larke (1588) was a pinnace in service in 1588.
- HMS Larke (1656) was an 8-gun ship captured by the Parliamentarians from the Royalists in 1656 and sold in 1663.
- HMS Larke (1675) was an 18-gun sixth rate launched in 1675 and sold in 1698.
- HMS Larke (1703) was a 42-gun fourth rate launched in 1703, rebuilt in 1726, hulked in 1742 and wrecked in 1744.
- HMS Larke (1744) was a 44-gun fifth rate launched in 1744 and sold in 1757.
- HMS Lark (1762) was a 32-gun fifth rate launched in 1762 and burnt to avoid being captured in 1778.
- HMS Lark (1779) was a 16-gun cutter purchased in 1779, rigged as a sloop from 1781 and sold in 1784.
- HMS Lark (1794) was a 16-gun sloop launched in 1794. She foundered in 1809.
- HMS Lark (1830) was a 2-gun survey cutter launched in 1830 and broken up in 1860.
- HMS Lark (1855) was a Dapper-class screw gunboat launched in 1855 and sold in 1878.
- HMS Lark (1877) was a survey schooner, previously in civilian service as the Falcon. She was purchased in 1877, renamed HMS Sparrowhawk later that year and sold in 1889.
- HMS Lark (1880) was a survey schooner launched in 1880 and sold in 1887.
- HMS Lark was an Doterel-class sloop launched in 1879 as HMS Kingfisher. She was renamed HMS Lark in 1892 and HMS Cruizer in 1893. She was sold in 1919.
- HMS Lark was a Cruizer-class sloop launched in 1852 as HMS Cruizer. She was renamed HMS Cruiser in 1857 and HMS Lark in 1893 as a training ship. She was sold in 1912.
- HMS Lark (1913) was a Laforey-class destroyer, previously named HMS Haughty but renamed shortly after being launched in 1913. She was sold in 1923.
- HMS Lark (U11) was a modified Black Swan-class sloop launched in 1943. She was torpedoed in 1945, salvaged by the Russians and recommissioned with them as Neptun. She was scrapped in 1956.

== See also ==
- Hired armed lugger Lark
- HMS Larkspur
