= Super Delicate =

"SUPER DELICATE"

Single by Hey! Say! JUMP

from the album JUMP World
- A-side: "SUPER DELICATE"
- B-side: "JUMP Around the World!!!"; "succeed"
- Released: (Japan) February 22, 2012
- Recorded: 2012
- Genre: J-pop
- Label: J Storm, Johnny & Associates

Hey! Say! JUMP singles chronology
"Magic Power" (2011)	"SUPER DELICATE" (2012)	"Come On A My House" (2013)

"SUPER DELICATE" is a single by Hey! Say! JUMP. It was released on 22 February 2012, and topped the Oricon Daily Single Chart selling 110,000 copies on its first day. The single was certified Platinum by the Recording Industry Association of Japan

== Information ==
"SUPER DELICATE" serves as the opening theme song for drama Risou no Musuko, a comedy drama which stars Hey! Say! JUMP members Ryosuke Yamada and Yuto Nakajima. The song lyrics were written by the scenario writer Shinji Nojima who also wrote the script for the drama as well.

The single was released on three versions: two limited edition and one regular.

== Video ==
=== Background and previews ===
On February 3, a short clip and behind the scenes footage of the single's PV was shown on the Japanese television, ZIP!. Another 26-second preview was shown on February 7, 2012.

A short version of the PV was released by J Storm last 10 February 2012 via We Believe in Music. The full PV was released on 22 February 2012.

== Performance ==
1. Hey! Say! JUMP's performance of the song was shown on Shonen Club last 13 February 2012.
2. The group performed the single on 10 February 2012 episode of Music Station.
3. Performed Ichiban song show (一番ソングSHOW) on 22 February 2012.
4. Group performed in Music Station 25 February 2012.

== Regular Edition ==
CD

1. "SUPER DELICATE"
2. "JUMP Around The World!!!"
3. "JUMP Around The World!!!" (Original Karaoke)
4. "succeed" (Original Karaoke)

== Limited Edition 1 ==
CD

1. "SUPER DELICATE"
2. "Su・Ri・Ru" - Hey! Say! BEST

DVD

1. "SUPER DELICATE" (PV & Making of)

== Limited Edition 2 ==
CD

1. "SUPER DELICATE"
2. "Wonderland Train" - Hey! Say! 7

DVD

1. "Th • ri • ll" (Video Clip) - Hey! Say! BEST
2. "Wonderland Train" (Video Clip) - Hey! Say! 7

== Charts and certifications ==
=== Charts ===
Chart (2012)	Peak position	Sales
Japan Oricon Daily Singles Chart	1	110,000
Japan Oricon Weekly Singles Chart	1	248,778
Japan Oricon Monthly Singles Chart	3	268,622
Japan Oricon Yearly Singles Chart	22	290,971

=== Sales and certifications ===
Country	Provider	Sales	Certification
Japan	RIAJ	290,971	Platinum

== Release history ==
Country	Date	Format	Label
Japan	22 February 2012	CDJACA-5308; CD+DVD AJACA-5304～5305; CD+DVD BJACA-5306～5307	J Storm
Hong Kong	23 March 2012	CD; CD+DVD A CD+DVD B	Avex Asia Limited
