= Red Riding Hood: A Detective Story =

Japanese novel series

- First novel volume cover (hardcover edition)

赤ずきん、旅の途中で死体と出会う。 (Akazukin, Tabi no Tochū de Shitai to Deau)
- Genre: Fantasy comedy; Mystery
- Novel series
- Written by: Aito Aoyagi
- Published by: Futabasha
- Original run: August 21, 2020 – present
- Volumes: 4
- Manga
- Written by: Aito Aoyagi
- Illustrated by: Kanoka Tana
- Published by: Futabasha
- Imprint: Action Comics
- Magazine: Monthly Action; (January 25, 2023 – February 24, 2024); Web Comic Action; (April 16, 2024 – May 20, 2025)
- Original run: January 25, 2023 – May 20, 2025
- Volumes: 4
- Anime television series
- Directed by: Itsuro Kawasaki
- Written by: Itsuro Kawasaki
- Music by: Jun Ichikawa
- Studio: Benten Film
- Licensed by: Crunchyroll
- Original network: Tokyo MX, BS NTV, ytv
- Original run: January 2027 – scheduled
- Live-action film
- Once Upon a Crime (2023)

Red Riding Hood: A Detective Story (赤ずきん、旅の途中で死体と出会う。, Akazukin, Tabi no Tochū de Shitai to Deau; lit. 'Little Red Riding Hood Encounters a Corpse on Her Journey') is a Japanese novel series written by Aito Aoyagi. It began publication by Futabasha in August 2020, with four volumes being released as of July 2025. A manga adaptation illustrated by Kanoka Tana began serialization in Futabasha's Monthly Action magazine in January 2023. After the magazine published its last issue in February 2024, the series was transferred to the Web Comic Action manga website, where it ran from April 2024 to May 2025. A live-action film adaptation titled Once Upon a Crime was released worldwide on Netflix in September 2023. An anime television series adaptation produced by Benten Film is set to premiere in January 2027.

== Plot ==
Forced to embark on an unexpected journey through a familiar fairy-tale world, Red Riding Hood finds herself repeatedly tangled in strange mysteries and crimes. Armed with her wits, she dives headfirst into solving each case, often leaving criminals confused by how easily she dismantles their plans.

== Characters ==
Little Red Riding Hood (赤ずきん, Akazukin)
Voiced by: Yume Miyamoto
Cinderella (シンデレラ, Shinderera)
Pinocchio (ピノキオ, Pinokio)
Voiced by: Akira Sekine
Jill (ジル, Jiru)
Voiced by: Takuya Satō
Antonio (アントニオ)
Voiced by: Atsushi Tamaru
Rodrigo (ロドリゴ, Rodorigo)
Voiced by: Motoko Kumai
Paolo (パオロ, Paoro)
Voiced by: Koutaro Nishiyama
Thumbelina (親指姫, Oyayubi-hime)
Voiced by: Sakiko Uran
Narrator (ナレーター, Narētā)
Voiced by: Ryoko Shiraishi

== Media ==
=== Novels ===
No.	Title	Release date	ISBN
1	Akazukin, Tabi no Tochū de Shitai to Deau (赤ずきん、旅の途中で死体と出会う。)	August 21, 2020 (hardcover); August 4, 2022 (paperback)	978-4-575-24289-8 (hardcover); 978-4-575-52592-2 (paperback)
2	Akazukin, Pinokio Hirotte Shitai to Deau (赤ずきん、ピノキオ拾って死体と出会う。)	October 20, 2022 (hardcover); September 11, 2024 (paperback)	978-4-575-24573-8 (hardcover); 978-4-575-52785-8 (paperback)
3	Akazukin, Arabian Naito de Shitai to Deau (赤ずきん、アラビアンナイトで死体と出会う。)	October 17, 2024	978-4-575-24774-9
4	Akazukin, Isoppu Dōwa de Shitai to Deau (赤ずきん、イソップ童話で死体と出会う。)	July 25, 2025	978-4-575-24830-2

=== Manga ===
A manga adaptation illustrated by Kanoka Tana began serialization in Futabasha's Monthly Action magazine on January 25, 2023. After the magazine published its final issue on February 24, 2024, the series was transferred to the Web Comic Action website, where it ran from April 16, 2024, to May 20, 2025. The manga adaptation's chapters were compiled into four tankōbon volumes released from August 9, 2023, to June 12, 2025.

No.	Release date	ISBN
1	August 9, 2023	978-4-575-85866-2
2	April 11, 2024	978-4-575-85954-6
3	November 14, 2024	978-4-575-86025-2
4	June 12, 2025	978-4-575-86093-1

=== Live-action film ===
A live-action film adaptation titled Once Upon a Crime was released worldwide on Netflix on September 14, 2023. It starred Kanna Hashimoto and Yuko Araki.

=== Anime ===
An anime television series adaptation was announced on August 10, 2026. The series will be produced by Benten Film and directed and written by Itsuro Kawasaki, with Manami Minakata and Yūko Yahiro designing the characters and Jun Ichikawa composing the music. It is set to premiere in January 2027 on Tokyo MX and other networks. Crunchyroll will stream the series worldwide excluding Asia.

== Reception ==
By August 2026, the series has over 600,000 copies in circulation.
