= Cally House =

Cally House may refer to:

- Cally Palace, formerly Cally House, Category A listed building in Dumfries and Galloway, Scotland
- Cally House, Category C listed building at Cally Bridge, Perth and Kinross, Scotland
