= HMS Venom (1794) =

Brig of the Royal Navy

Venom
History

Great Britain
- Name: Venom
- Acquired: 1794, by capture
- Honours and awards: Naval General Service Medal with clasp "17 Mar. Boat Service 1794"
- Fate: Delisted 1799 or 1800

General characteristics
- Tons burthen: 12842/94 (bm)
- Length: 65 ft 1 in (19.8 m) (overall); 47 ft 1 in (14.4 m) (keel)
- Beam: 22 ft 8 in (6.9 m)
- Depth of hold: 9 ft 0 in (2.7 m)
- Complement: 45
- Armament: 4 × 4-pounder guns + 4 × 18-pounder carronades
- Notes: Although some sources report that Venom was the French Navy tartane Génie that Commodore Horatio Nelson captured at Oneglia on 31 May 1796, this is clearly incorrect as Venom was already two years into her service with the Royal Navy by that time.

HMS Venom was a captured in the Caribbean in 1794 that Admiral Sir John Jervis purchased. (Note: It has so far not been possible to identify the origins of this brig from readily available online resources.) The Royal Navy commissioned her as a gunbrig under the command of Lieutenant Thomas H. Wilson. In March and April 1794, she participated in the capture of Martinique, St. Lucia, and Guadeloupe. Jervis's expedition restored monarchist rule. The French counter-attacked and recaptured Guadeloupe on 2 June. Jervis and General Sir Charles Grey, the army commander, landed a force to recapture the island but the reinforced French garrison repulsed the British expedition, which withdrew.

Venom was deleted from the lists in 1799 or 1800. After commanding Venom, Wilson assumed command of the hired armed lugger Lark on 21 April 1800.

Prize money: The London Gazette published details for four tranches of prize and head money payments for Jervis's campaign. In all some 36 ships qualified: HMS Asia, Assurance, Avenger, Boyne, Beauleau, Blonde, Bull Dog, Ceres, Dromedary, Experiment, Irresistible, Inspector, Nautilus, Quebec, Roebuck, Rattlesnake, Rose, Retort, Santa Margarita, Solebay, Seaflower, Terpsichore, Ulysses, Undaunted, Vengeance, Veteran, Vesuvius, Winchelsea, Wooolwich (sic), and Zebra. So did six gunboats: Spiteful, Teazer, Tickler, Tormentor, Venom, and Vexor.

Year	Martinique	St Lucia	Guadaloupe	All three
Captain's share
1795	£150 0s 1 3/4d	£24 10s 1 1/2d	£29 10s 3 1/4d	£203 11s 4 3/4d
1797	£29 6s 8 1/2d	£12 9s 1 1/4d	£9 7s 2 1/4d	£51 3s 0d
1800	£695 16s 8 1/4d	£10 7s 6 1/4d	£71 0s 3 1/4d	£777 4s 6 3/4d
1806	£51 4s 2 1/2d	£5 12s 0d	£12 12 6 1/4	£69 8s 8 3/4
Total	£926 7s 9d	£52 14s 9d	£122 10s 3d	£1102 7s 8 1/4d
Seaman's share
1795	£0 15s 4 3/4d	£0 2s 5 1/4d	£0 3s 0d	£1 0s 10d
1797	£0 3s 0d	£0 1s 3d	£0 0s 11 1/4d	£0 5s 2 1/4d
1800	£3 5s 9 1/4d	£0 0s 11 1/2d	£0 6s 8d	£5 13s 4 3/4d
1806	£0 4s 10d	£0 0s 6 1/4d	£0 1s 2d	£0 6s 6 1/4d
Total	£4 9s 0d	£5 2s 0d	£0 12s 7 1/4d	£10 11s 7 1/4d

In 1847 the Admiralty awarded the Naval General Service Medal with clasp "17 Mar. Boat Service 1794" to all surviving claimants from the action at Fort Royal Bay, Martinique during which the boats of Venom, and others, captured the French frigate Bienvenue, and other vessels.
