= Yuko Araki =

Japanese actress and model (born 1993)

- 新木 優子
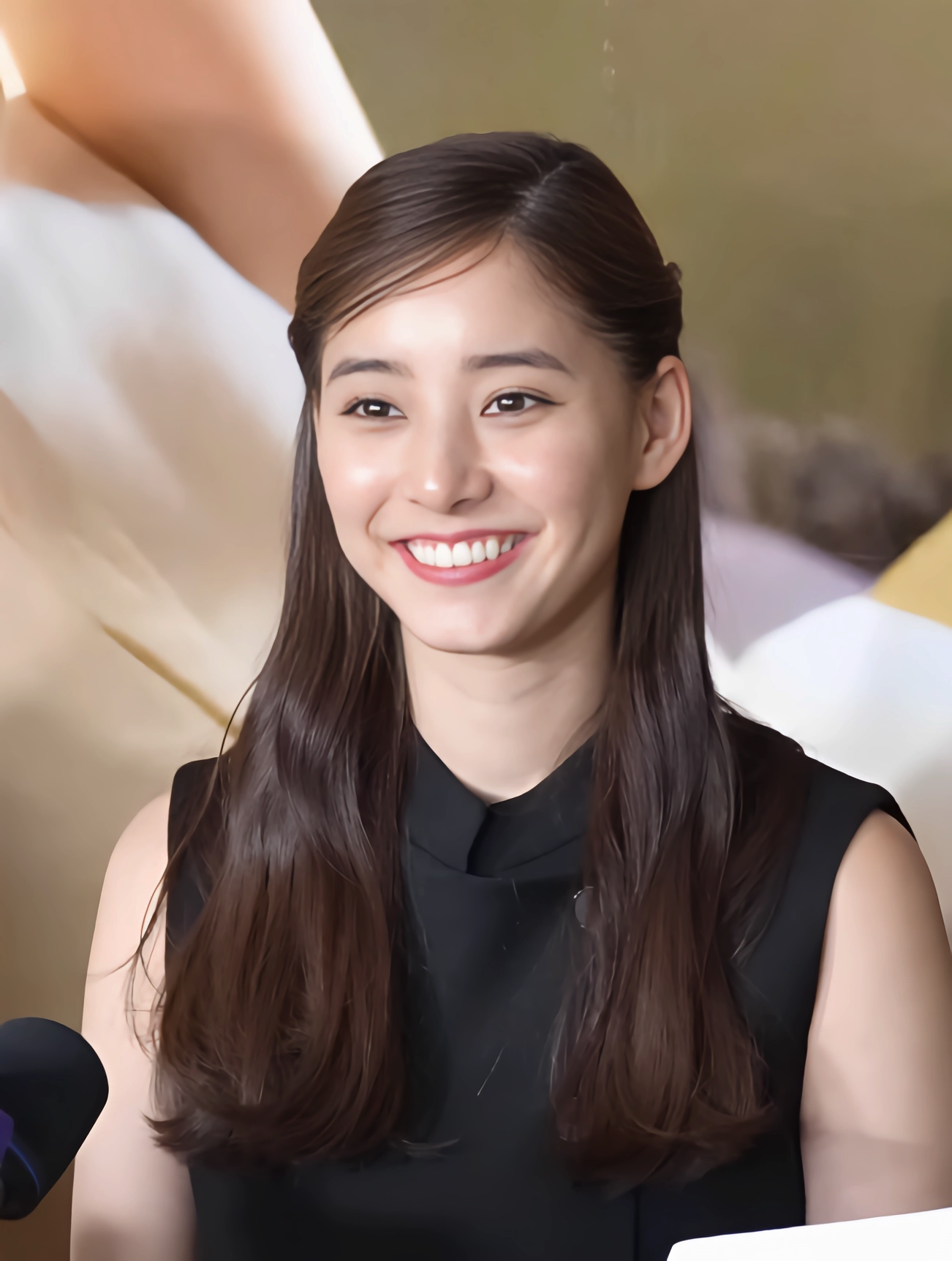
- Araki in June 2023
- Born: 15 December 1993 (age 32); Tokyo, Japan
- Occupations: Actress; model
- Years active: 2007–present
- Agent: Stardust Promotion
- Height: 165 cm (5 ft 5 in)
- Spouse: Yuto Nakajima (m. 2026)
- Website: stardust.co.jp/arakiyuko

Yuko Araki (新木 優子, Araki Yūko; born 15 December 1993 in Tokyo) is a Japanese actress and fashion model. Her most notable works are films Our Meal for Tomorrow (2017), That Girl's Captives of Love (2018), See Hear Love (2023), Once Upon a Crime (2023), and Kingdom 4: Return of the Great General (2024), as well as television series Code Blue (2017), Kiss that Kills (2018), Suits (2018–2020), and Roppongi Class (2022). She is represented by Stardust Promotion.

== Life and career ==
Araki was scouted on Takeshita Street in Harajuku when she was in the fifth grade by her agency, Stardust Promotion. She initially worked as a model for children's clothing catalogues before making her on-screen debut in May 2008 with a main role in Ikari o Nagero. She subsequently had minor roles in films such as Aoi Tori, Confessions, and Usotsuki Mii-kun to Kowareta Maa-chan.

Even up until high school, Araki struggled to pass acting auditions. Upon entering university, she decided that if she did not achieve results within the next four years, she would give up on acting. She would experience a breakthrough in her career in 2014 when she became an exclusive model for the magazine Non-no, making her a flagship model. She then began appearing in commercials, signing contracts with major companies, such as Skylark Holdings' restaurant Gusto.

In 2015, she was chosen as the 8th CM girl for wedding magazine Zexy, which increased her public recognition. Her modelling work increased her public profile, which helped her get more acting jobs. Despite being in the entertainment industry since the age of 10, she was frequently introduced as a "new actress", so she began to devote herself to acting as if she were a newcomer. She secured her first leading television drama role in the Fuji TV drama Love Love Alien in 2016.

In 2017, Araki had supporting roles in the shows Crisis: Special Security Squad and Code Blue Season 3. In July, she released her first photo book, "Girlfriend". In August, she was selected as the model for fashion brand SLY's 2017-18 fall/winter campaign.

In 2018, she appeared in several notable dramas, including the NTV drama Kiss That Kills and the Fuji TV drama Suits.

In January 2019, she played the leading role in Trace: Kasouken no Otoko. On July 12, 2019, with the film's release, she made her voice acting debut as Gabby Gabby in the Japanese dub of Toy Story 4. In October, she co-starred with Kora Kengo in the Fuji TV Thursday drama Motokare Mania, marking her first lead role in a terrestrial TV drama.

In February 2020, Araki was appointed as a Japanese brand ambassador for the French luxury fashion brand Dior, with whom she had frequently been affiliated with, attending their fashion shows since 2018. In October of the same year, she starred in her first drama as a solo lead in the Wowow drama series The Confession of the Sirens.

Araki graduated from her position as an exclusive model for Non-no in their December 2021 issue, which was released on October 20, 2021.

On March 26, 2022, she launched her official YouTube channel.

== Personal life ==
On April 11, 2026, Araki and actor Yuto Nakajima jointly announced that they had officially registered their marriage.

== Filmography ==
=== Film ===
Year	Title	Role	Notes	Ref.
2008	Ikari o Nagero	Naomi	Lead role	
2008	Aoi Tori	Mai Katayama		
2010	Confessions			
2011	Usotsuki Mii-kun to Kowareta Maa-chan			
2013	School Girl Complex Hōsōbu Hen	Futaba Eriguchi		
2013	Yurusenai, Aitai	Mari Hashimoto		
2015	Kazoku-gokko		Omnibus film; appeared in "Hinnyū Club"	
2015	Kaze no Tayori	Kurumi	Lead role	
2016	Nakimushi Piero no Kekkonshiki	Maki Inaba		
2016	Intern!	Haruka Kawakura	Lead role	
2016	Satoshi: A Move for Tomorrow	Bookstore clerk		
2017	Our Meal for Tomorrow	Koharu Uemura	Lead role	
2017	Evil and the Mask	Kaori		
2018	That Girl's Captives of Love	Shizuku		
2021	The Crocodile That Lived for 100 Days	Senpai (voice)		
2022	The Hound of the Baskervilles: Sherlock the Movie	Beni Hasukabe		
2023	See Hear Love	Hibiki Aida		
2023	Once Upon a Crime	Cinderella		
2024	Kingdom 4: Return of the Great General	Liao		
2024	Previously Saved Version	Mayumi		
2026	Until We Meet Again	Haruka Urushibara		

=== Television series ===
Year	Title	Role	Notes	Ref.
2009	Real Clothes		Episode 7	
2012	Dragon Seinendan	Yuka		
2013	Kamen Rider Wizard	Chiaki Shimizu	Episodes 34 and 35	
2015	A Girl's Breakfast	Risa Arai		
2015	Prison School	Anzu Yokoyama		
2016	Your Home is My Business!	Madoka Murata		
2016	Love Love Alien	Sonomi Ishibashi	Lead role	
2017	Crisis: Special Security Squad	Oyama Rei		
2017	Million Yen Women	Hiraki Nanaka		
2017	Code Blue Season 3	Yokomine Akari		
2018	Kiss that Kills	Mikoto Namiki		
2018	We Are Rockets!	Aoi Fujitani		
2019	Motokare Mania	Yurika	Lead role	
2022	The Forbidden Magic	Tomoka Makimura	Television film	
2022	Roppongi Class	Yuka Kusunoki		

=== Dubbing ===
Year	Title	Role	Notes	Ref.
2019	Toy Story 4	Gabby Gabby		

=== Music video appearances ===
Year	Title	Artist	Ref.
2007	"Taiyō no Nihohi"	Naotarō Moriyama	
2009	"Lady Don't Cry"	D-51	
2010	"echoes"	universe	
2011	"Someday Again: Mataau Hi Made"	Love	
2011	"Gomen ne, Mama"	Yu-A	
2011	"Majime na Hito"	suzumoku	
2013	"for You."	Hazzie	
2014	"Mrs. Summer"	Galileo Galilei	
2015	"Mirai (Ashita)"	BtoB	
2016	"Bokura no Tame ni..."	Ketsumeishi	
2021	"Hanauranai"	Vaundy	

== Accolades ==
She was honoured with Excellence Award at 2020 Asia Contents Awards & Global OTT Awards for her work in the industry.
