= Once upon a Crime (2023 film) =

2023 film by Yūichi Fukuda

Once Upon a Crime
- Theatrical release poster
- Directed by: Yūichi Fukuda
- Screenplay by: Yūichi Fukuda; Tetsuo Kamata
- Based on: Red Riding Hood: A Detective Story by Aito Aoyagi
- Starring: Kanna Hashimoto; Yuko Araki; Takanori Iwata; Mirei Kiritani
- Production company: Credeus
- Distributed by: Netflix
- Release date: September 14, 2023
- Running time: 107 minutes
- Country: Japan
- Language: Japanese

Once Upon a Crime (Note: Kanji: 赤ずきん、旅の途中で死体と出会う。 Akazukin, Tabi no Tochū de Shitai to Deau lit. meaning: Little Red Riding Hood, on her journey, encounters a corpse)) is a 2023 Japanese fantasy comedy crime mystery film, starring Kanna Hashimoto and Yuko Araki in the main roles as Little Red Riding Hood and Cinderella, respectively. Based on the novel Red Riding Hood: A Detective Story by Aito Aoyagi and directed by Yūichi Fukuda, the story combines elements from the stories of Cinderella and the Little Red Riding Hood, as the latter uses her investigative skills to try to solve the mystery behind a murder. The film was released worldwide on Netflix on September 14, 2023.

== Premise ==
Little Red Riding Hood meets Cinderella in the woods. Together, they meet two witches and express their desire to go to the ball at the castle. The witches give them new dresses, glass slippers and a carriage driven by a mouse turned into a man. On their way to castle, they run over a corpse and, taking a closer look, Little Red Riding Hood exercises her detective skills. They hide the corpse and proceed to the ball, where Cinderella has a dance with the prince until guards report the discovery of the corpse.

== Cast ==
- Kanna Hashimoto as Little Red Riding Hood
- Yuko Araki as Cinderella
- Takanori Iwata as Prince Gilbert
- Natsuna Watanabe as Anne (Cinderella's sister in a green dress)
- Yumi Wakatsuki as Margot (Cinderella's sister in a yellow dress)
- Miki Maya as Isabella (Cinderella's step-mother)
- Midoriko Kimura as Barbara the witch
- Mirei Kiritani as Tekla the witch
- Tsuyoshi Muro as Paul the mouse
- Masaki Kaji as Hans, the royal hairdresser
- Jiro Sato as King Bovell of the kingdom of Claire de Lune
- Mizuki Yamamoto as Karen/Remi
- Tomoharu Hasegawa as Lord Chamberlain, herald to the King
- Atsuhiro Inukai as the staircase guard
