= The Lark in the Morning =

Song

The Lark in the Morning (Roud 151) is an English folk song. It was moderately popular with traditional singers in England, less so in Scotland, Ireland and the United States. It starts as a hymn to the ploughboy's life, and often goes on to recount a sexual encounter between a ploughboy and a maiden resulting in pregnancy.

== Synopsis ==
Some versions start with a verse in which a maid is overheard praising the life of a ploughboy. More often the song starts with a verse describing the lark's song:

The lark in the morning ariseth from her nest
And mounts in the air with the dew on her breast,
With the pretty ploughboy she’ll whistle & sing
And at night she’ll return to her nest again.

And goes on to describe the ploughboy's leisure pursuits:

When his days work is done, that he has for to do
Perhaps to some country wake he will go
There with his sweetheart he will dance and sing
And at midnight return with his lass back again.

On the journey home they tumble in the hay, and some months later the girl's mother makes the usual inquiry:

Oh, it was the pretty ploughboy,” the damsel she did say,
Who caused me for to tumble all along the new-mown hay.

Typically the song ends with a verse wishing good luck to "the ploughboys, wherever they may be".

Mr Kemp from Herongate in Essex, in Lay Still, a variant collected by Ralph Vaughan Williams starts with a conversation between a shepherd and Floro in which she suggests he stay in bed because the day is wet and he responds that he will go to tend to his flock:

“Lay still my fond shepherd and don't you rise yet
It's a fine dewy morning and besides, my love, it is wet.”

“Oh let it be wet my love and ever so cold
I will rise my fond Floro and away to my fold.”

“Oh no, my bright Floro, it is no such thing
It's a bright sun a-shining and the lark is on the wing.”

And then goes on to sing the Lark in the morning verse and some verses about ploughboys.

== History ==
=== Early printed versions ===
The earliest known version was published in a garland (a broadside containing a number of songs) called Four Excellent New Songs printed in Edinburgh in 1778. It was regularly reprinted by broadside publishers in the 19th century.

=== Collecting history ===
The Roud Folk Song Index lists 37 instances of this song collected from traditional singers - 28 from England, 2 from Scotland, 4 from Ireland and 3 from the United States.

=== Cornish folk song ===
An Awhesyth, a Cornish folk song, has some verses which are very similar in meaning. The precise relationship between the two songs is unclear.

== Recordings ==
=== Field recordings ===
- Steve Gardham's recording of Yorkshire singer Dorothy Bavey singing this in 1969 is in the British Library Sound Archive.
- Peter Kennedy's recording of Sussex singers Bob and Ron Copper is on a Topic CD, "Come Write Me Down - Early Recordings of the Copper Family of Rottingdean".
- A 1966 recording by Irish singer Paddy Tunney is on The Voice of the People Volume 5: "Come All My Lads That Follow the Plough - The Life of Rural Working Men and Women".

=== Commercial recordings ===
Steeleye Span, Maddy Prior, The Dubliners, Tony Rose, The Taverners, Jackie Oates, and Magpie Lane have all recorded versions. Oli Steadman recorded it on his song collection "365 Days Of Folk".

== Discussion ==
In his notes in The New Penguin Book of English Folk Songs, Steve Roud suggests that our picture of this song is incomplete because "the early collectors were not keen on the sexual encounters and noted down, or published, only the safe pastoral verses". He feels this song was "probably even more popular than the collected versions indicate", for the same reason.

== See also ==
- "An Awhesyth" lists other variants of the song
