= Roppongi Class =

2022 Japanese television series

Japanese name
- Kanji: 六本木クラス
- Created by: Jo Gwang-jin
- Written by: Koji Tokuo
- Directed by: Naomi Tamura, Naomi Kinoshita
- Country of origin: Japan
- Original language: Japanese
- No. of episodes: 13

Production
- Production companies: TV Asahi; Kakao Entertainment; Kross Pictures; SLL; As Birds

Original release
- Network: TV Asahi
- Release: July 7 – September 29, 2022

Roppongi Class (Japanese: 六本木クラス) is a Japanese television drama series based on Korean web comic Itaewon Class and a remake of the Korean drama of the same name. It stars Ryoma Takeuchi and was first aired on TV Asahi in July 2022.

== Synopsis ==
Arata Miyabe (Ryoma Takeuchi) lives an ordinary life with his father in Roppongi, an area of Tokyo. His life drastically changes when he gets involved with a case involving Nagaya Holding's heir.

== Broadcast ==
The first episode was broadcast on July 7, 2022, in Japan on TV Asahi, and the final episode on September 29, 2022. Its last episode ended with a highest viewership rating of 10.7%.

== Cast ==
Actor	Role	Description
Ryoma Takeuchi	Arata Miyabe	Manager of Nidaime Miyabe eatery
Yuko Araki	Yuka Kusunoki	Arata's classmate and first love, works at Nagaya Holdings
Yurina Hirate	Aoi Asamiya	Employee at Nidaime Miyabe eatery, high school student
Taichi Saotome	Ryuga Nagaya	Eldest son of Shigeru Nagaya
Akiyoshi Nakao	Ryota Uchiyama	Employee at Nidaime Miyabe eatery
Oji Suzuka	Ryuji Nagaya	Second son of Shigeru Nagaya, classmate of Aoi
Honami Sato	Riku Ayase	Employee at Nidaime Miyabe eatery
Koen Kondo	Yukio Sakuragi	Secretary of Shigeru Nagaya
Michiko Tanaka	Garushia Risa	Owner of Flecha Verde bar
Kenji Matsuda	Kino	Leader in prison
Keiko Horiuchi	Eriko Asamiya	Aoi's mother
Ken Mitsuishi	Shinji Miyabe	Arata's father
Yuma Yamoto	Yudai Kirino	Arata and Ryuga's classmate
Naoto Ogata	Hirotsugu Matsushita	Detective at Futaba Police Station
Izumi Inamori	Kyoko Aikawa	Senior Managing Director at Nagaya Holdings
Teruyuki Kagawa	Shigeru Nagaya	Chairman and founder of Nagaya Holdings
