= Magic Power =

Single by Hey! Say! JUMP

from the album JUMP World
- A-side: "Magic Power"
- B-side: "Beat Line"; "Nemuri no Mori"; "BE ALIVE"
- Released: (Japan) September 21, 2011
- Recorded: 2011
- Genre: J-pop
- Label: J Storm, Johnny & Associates
- Songwriter(s): Yuusuke Itagaki, Kanata Okajima

Hey! Say! JUMP singles chronology
"OVER" (2011)	"Magic Power" (2011)	"SUPER DELICATE" (2012)

"Magic Power" is a single release by Hey! Say! JUMP. It was released in three different versions: a limited CD+DVD edition 1, a limited CD+DVD edition 2, and a regular CD-only edition. The single will be the theme song for the Japanese dub of the animated movie, The Smurfs, in which members Ryosuke Yamada and Yuri Chinen provided the voices for Clumsy Smurf and Brainy Smurf respectively. This was the group's first single without Morimoto, due to the smoking scandal and suspension. It was certified platinum by the RIAJ.

== Regular Edition ==
CD

1. "Magic Power"
2. "Beat Line"
3. "Nemuri no Mori"
4. "BE ALIVE"
5. "Magic Power" (Original Karaoke)
6. "Beat Line" (Original Karaoke)
7. "Nemuri no Mori" (Original Karaoke)
8. "BE ALIVE" (Original Karaoke)

== Limited Edition 1 ==
CD

1. "Magic Power"
2. "School Days" - Hey! Say! BEST

DVD

1. "Magic Power" (PV & Making of)

== Limited Edition 2 ==
CD

1. "Magic Power"
2. "GET!!" - Hey! Say! 7

DVD

1. 30 minute footage of Hey! Say! JUMP & Yuuki 100% Concert with Yuma Nakayama Spring Concert in Nagoya.

== Charts ==
Chart (2011)	Peak position
Japan Oricon Weekly Singles Chart	1
Japan Oricon Monthly Singles Chart	3
Japan Oricon Yearly Singles Chart	21

Total Reported Sales: 254,171
