= Arigatō (Sekai no Doko ni Ite mo) =

2010 single by Hey! Say! JUMP

Single by Hey! Say! JUMP

from the album JUMP World
- A-side: "Arigatō (Sekai no Doko ni Ite mo)"
- Released: (Japan) December 15, 2010
- Recorded: 2010
- Genre: J-pop, Electropop
- Label: J Storm, Johnny & Associates

Hey! Say! JUMP singles chronology
"Hitomi no Screen" (2010)	"Arigatō (Sekai no Doko ni Ite mo)" (2010)	"OVER" (2011)

"Arigatō (Sekai no Doko ni Ite mo)" is a single by Hey! Say! JUMP. It was released on December 15, 2010.

== Information ==
"Arigatō (Sekai no Doko ni Ite mo)" is the second single by Hey! Say! JUMP for the year 2010. They compiled their hits from their debut until this single on their first album, JUMP No. 1, showing how much the ten members had grown over the years. This single marked the beginning of their next stage. The theme of the song is "Thank You" and how this is unique in every country. Though the title is rather peaceful, the song itself is more of a hard dance number that will show that Hey! Say! JUMP have become adults.

The single was released in both regular and a CD + DVD limited version. The CD contained the title song plus three different couplings, all with their own karaoke version, for a total of eight songs on the single. The DVD version came out with the music video and making of the single. The Jacket Designs were completely different between the two versions.

== Regular Edition ==
CD

1. "Arigatō (Sekai no Doko ni Ite mo)"
2. "FLY"
3. "Snow Song"
4. "Futari Kake no Basho"
5. "Arigatō (Sekai no Doko ni Ite mo)" (Original Karaoke)
6. "FLY" (Original Karaoke)
7. "Snow Song" (Original Karaoke)
8. "Futari Kake no Basho" (Original Karaoke)

== Limited Edition ==
CD

1. "Arigatō (Sekai no Doko ni Ite mo)"
2. "Arigatō (Sekai no Doko ni Ite mo)" (Original Karaoke)

DVD

1. "Arigatō (Sekai no Doko ni Ite mo)" (PV & Making of)

== Charts and certifications ==
=== Charts ===
Chart (2010/2011)	Peak position	Sales
Japan Oricon Weekly Singles Chart	1	150,504
Japan Oricon Monthly Singles Chart	3	166,399
Japan Oricon Yearly Singles Chart	38	188,555

=== Sales and certifications ===
Country	Provider	Sales	Certification
Japan	RIAJ	188,964	Gold
