= Skylarking (disambiguation) =

Skylarking is a 1986 album by XTC. The title is another way of saying "fooling around".

Skylarking or Skylarkin' may also refer to:

- Skylarking (Horace Andy album), 1972
- Skylarkin' (Mic Christopher album), 2001
- Skylarkin' (Grover Washington, Jr. album), 1980
- Skylarking (birds), refers to the aerial displays including song made by various species of birds

== See also ==
- Sky Larkin, a UK indie rock band
- Skylark (disambiguation)
