= Over (Hey! Say! JUMP song) =

"OVER"

Single by Hey! Say! JUMP

from the album JUMP World
- A-side: "OVER"
- B-side: "Aiing: Aishiteru"; "You Got More"; "Screw"
- Released: (Japan) June 29, 2011
- Recorded: 2011
- Genre: J-pop
- Label: J Storm, Johnny & Associates

Hey! Say! JUMP singles chronology
"Arigatō (Sekai no Doko ni Ite mo)" (2010)	"OVER" (2011)	"Magic Power" (2011)

"OVER" is a single by Hey! Say! JUMP, released on June 29, 2011. In its first week, "OVER" sold 265,390 copies, over 18,000 more than the first week sales of their single "Ultra Music Power" in 2007, which remains Hey! Say! JUMP's highest selling single to date. It was certified Platinum by the Recording Industry Association of Japan.

"OVER" was released in three versions: two limited CD+DVD editions and a regular CD-only edition.

== Regular Edition ==
CD

1. "OVER"
2. "Aiing: Aishiteru"
3. "You Got More" - Hey! Say! 7
4. "Screw" - Hey! Say! BEST
5. "OVER" (Original Karaoke)
6. "Aiing: Aishiteru" (Original Karaoke)
7. "You Got More" (Original Karaoke) - Hey! Say! 7
8. "Screw" (Original Karaoke) - Hey! Say! BEST

== Limited Edition 1 ==
CD

1. "OVER"
2. "OVER" (Original Karaoke)

DVD

1. "OVER" (PV & Making of)

== Limited Edition 2 ==
CD

1. "OVER"
2. "Born in the EARTH"

DVD

1. "Aiing: Aishiteru" (Video Clip)

== Charts and certifications ==
Chart	Peak position
Japan Oricon Weekly Singles Chart	1
Japan Oricon Monthly Singles Chart}	2
Japan Oricon Yearly Singles Chart	15

=== Sales and certifications ===
Country	Provider	Sales	Certification
Japan	RIAJ	397,804	Platinum
