= Anoko no Toriko =

Japanese manga series

- First volume cover

あのコの、トリコ。
- Genre: Romance
- Manga
- Written by: Yuki Shiraishi
- Published by: Shogakukan
- Magazine: Sho-Comi
- Original run: September 5, 2013 – October 5, 2014
- Volumes: 6

Anoko no Toriko (あのコの、トリコ。) is a Japanese manga series written and illustrated by Yuki Shiraishi. It was serialized in Shogakukan's Sho-Comi magazine from September 2013 to October 2014. A live-action film adaptation premiered in Japanese theaters in October 2018.

== Plot ==
Yori Suzuki, Shizuku Tachibana, and Subaru Tojo, are three childhood friends who once promised that they would all become stars in the entertainment world. Years later, Yori grows up living a quiet life in the countryside, while Shizuku becomes a popular model and aspiring actress and Subaru becomes a successful actor. After learning about their success, Yori transfers to their high school in order to reunite with them and pursue the dream they once shared. He also hopes to be close to Shizuku, whom he has always loved.

Yori begins helping Shizuku with her work as an assistant, supporting her behind the scenes. However, after an unexpected stroke of luck, he gains sudden popularity and enters the entertainment industry. As Yori, Shizuku, and Subaru begin working in the same industry, their relationship becomes more complicated, especially when Subaru confesses his feelings to Shizuku.

== Media ==
=== Manga ===
Written and illustrated by Yuki Shiraishi, Anoko no Toriko was initially serialized in Shogakukan's shōjo manga magazine Sho-Comi from September 5, 2013, to October 5, 2014. On July 5, 2018, the series resumed serialization to commemorate the film adaptation. It ran up until September 1 of the same year. The series' chapters were collected into six tankōbon volumes from January 24, 2014, to September 26, 2018.

No.	Release date	ISBN
1	January 24, 2014	978-4-09-135748-9
2	April 25, 2014	978-4-09-135884-4
3	July 25, 2014	978-4-09-136173-8
4	December 26, 2014	978-4-09-136587-3
5	July 26, 2017	978-4-09-139366-1
6	September 26, 2018	978-4-09-870222-0

=== Live-action ===
A live-action film adaptation premiered in Japanese theaters on October 5, 2018. The film was directed by Ryô Miyawaki, with scripts written by Taeko Asano, and featured performances by Ryo Yoshizawa, Yuko Araki, and Yosuke Sugino.
