= Hana Egao =

Song by Hey! Say! 7

from the album JUMP World
- Recorded: 2011–2012
- Genre: J-Pop
- Length: 5:03
- Label: J Storm
- Songwriter(s): Ryosuke Yamada
- Producer(s): Julie K.

"Hana Egao" (花 えがお, Hana egao, "Flower Smile") is a song recorded by Hey! Say! 7 for Hey! Say! JUMP's second album JUMP World. The song is used for Yuri Chinen's romantic comedy drama "Sprout!".

== Composition ==
The lyrics were written by Hey! Say! JUMP member Ryosuke Yamada. The music and arrangement was done by Sugiyama Katsuhiko and Ogura Shinkō.

== Credits and personnel ==
Personnel

- Songwriting – Ryosuke Yamada
- Production – Sugiyama Katsuhiko and Ogura Shinkō.

== Charts ==
The album containing the song peaked at number 1 spot prior to its debut released.

Chart (2012)	Peak position
Japan Oricon Daily Album Chart	1
Japan Oricon Weekly Album Chart	1
Japan Oricon Monthly Album Chart	2
