= Our Meal for Tomorrow =

Japanese romance film

- Theatrical release poster
- Directed by: Masahide Ichii
- Written by: Masahide Ichii
- Based on: Our Meal for Tomorrow by Maiko Seo
- Produced by: Miyako Araki; Yasushi Udagawa
- Starring: Yuto Nakajima; Yuko Araki; Amane Okayama; Karen Miyama; Chieko Matsubara
- Cinematography: Masashi Seki
- Edited by: Naoichiro Sagara
- Music by: Shu Kanematsu
- Production company: Dub Japan
- Distributed by: Asmik Ace
- Release date: 7 January 2017
- Running time: 109 minutes
- Country: Japan
- Language: Japanese

Our Meal for Tomorrow (Bokura no Gohan wa Ashita de Matteru/僕らのごはんは明日で待ってる) is a 2017 Japanese romance drama film, directed by Masahide Ichii and based on the novel by Maiko Seo. It stars Yuto Nakajima and Yuko Araki. The film was released in Japan on January 7, 2017.

== Plot ==
Ryota Hayama is a sensitive loner, disliked by his schoolmates, and always downcast and unhappy. He is called Jesus by schoolmates because of his perpetual sad look. Koharu Uemura takes a liking to him, and they start a relationship. The relationship continues until unexpectedly, Koharu breaks up with him, telling him that her grandmother disapproved of their relationship. Hayama is devastated, however he is approached by Emiri who is in love with him, and they start going out. Hayama however, realised that he is still in love with Koharu, and splits up with his new girlfriend, telling Hayama that he still loves her. He approaches Uemura to try to rekindle their relationship, however is once again rebuffed. He then finds out that all is not what it seems.

== Cast ==
- Yuto Nakajima as Ryota Hayama
- Yuko Araki as Koharu Uemura
- Amane Okayama as Yusuke Tsukahara
- Karen Miyama as Emiri Suzuhara
- Chieko Matsubara as Meiko Uemura

== Production ==
Filming was entirely in Japan; running time was 109 minutes.
