= Suits (Japanese TV series) =

Japanese television series

- Genre: Legal drama
- Based on: Suits by Aaron Korsh
- Written by: Junya Ikegami
- Directed by: Masato Hijikata; Yusuke Ishii
- Starring: Yuji Oda; Yuto Nakajima
- Ending theme: Wolf by B'z
- Composer: Akihiro Manabe
- Country of origin: Japan
- Original language: Japanese
- No. of seasons: 2
- No. of episodes: 26

Production
- Producers: Hiroyuki Goto; Hiroshi Kobayashi
- Production locations: Tokyo, Japan
- Running time: 60 minutes
- Production companies: Kyodo Television; Fuji TV; NBCUniversal International Television

Original release
- Network: Fuji TV
- Release: October 8, 2018 – present

Related
- Suits (United States); Suits (South Korea)

Suits (スーツ) is a Japanese television drama starring Yuji Oda and Yuto Nakajima. The drama is based on the American television series of the same name by Aaron Korsh. Its first season aired on Fuji TV from October 8 to December 17, 2018. The second season's first two episodes aired on April 13 and April 20, 2020. Production of the season was postponed due to the COVID-19 pandemic, but resumed in June and aired from July 27 to October 19, 2020.

== Cast ==
- Yuji Oda as Shogo Kai (based on Harvey Specter)
- Yuto Nakajima as Daiki Suzuki (based on Mike Ross)
- Yuko Araki as Makoto Hijirisawa (based on Rachel Zane)
- Honami Suzuki as Chika Yukimura (based on Jessica Pearson)
- Anne Nakamura as Kayako Tamai
- Hayato Isomura as Yusei Tanimoto
- Mio Imada as Sari Tanimoto
- Jun Kunimura as Shinji Yanagi
- Reiko Tajima as Yui Suzuki
- Shinya Kote as Mitsugi Kanie

Preceded by Zettai Reido: Mizen Hanzai Sennyū Sōsa; July 9, 2018 – September 10, 2018	Fuji TV Monday Dramas; Mondays 21:00–21:54 (JST)	Succeeded by Trace: Kasōken no Otoko; January 7, 2019 – 2019
