= Lark Wood =

Protected area in Gloucestershire, England

- Site of Special Scientific Interest
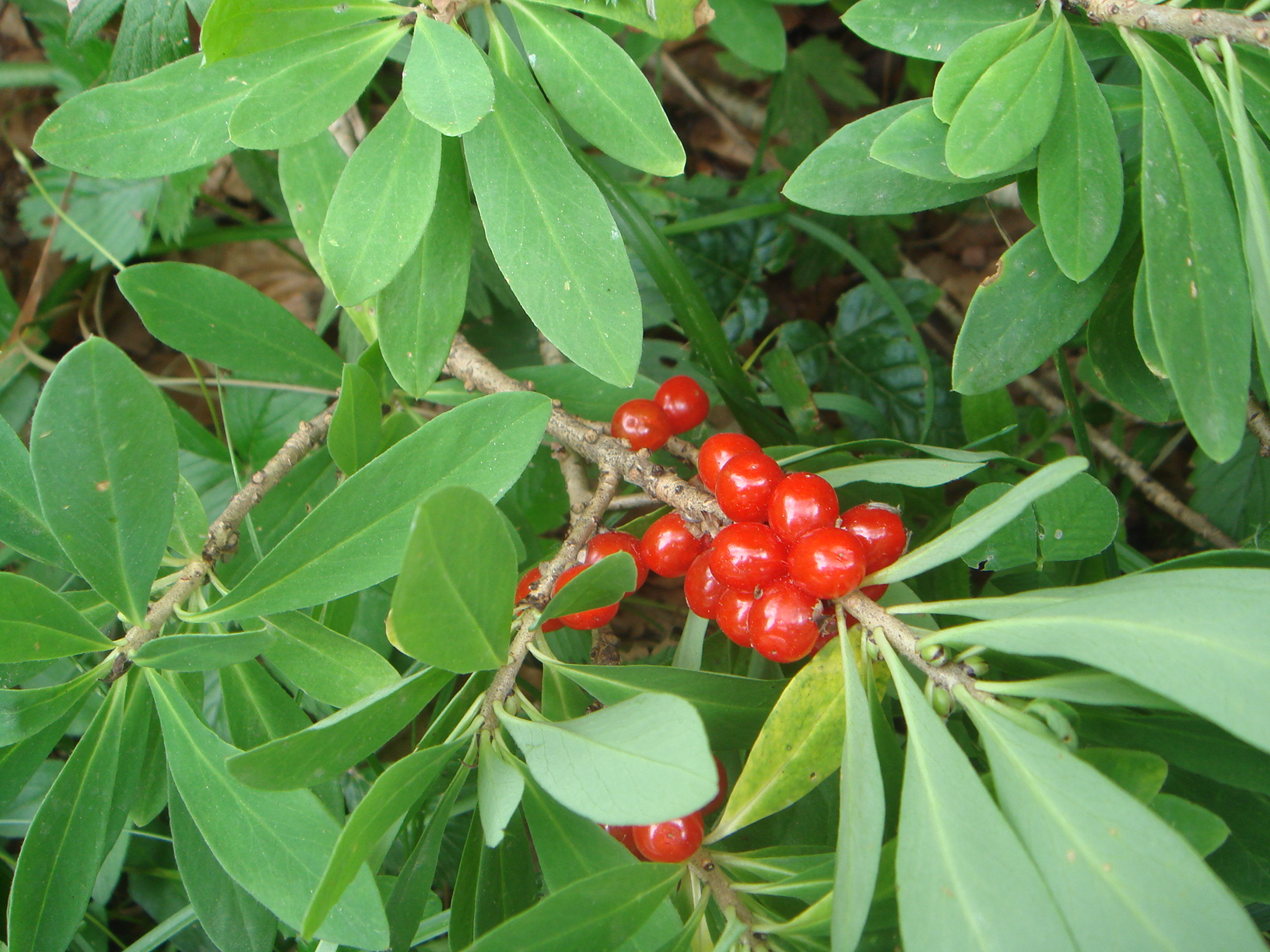
- Example - Mezereum (Daphne mezereum)

- Location within Gloucestershire
- Location of Lark Wood.
- Area of search: Gloucestershire
- Grid reference: SP104262
- Coordinates: 51.934663°N 1.849413°W
- Interest: Biological
- Area: 1.11 ha (2.7 acres)
- Notification date: 1974

Lark Wood (grid reference SP104262) is a 1.11-hectare (2.7-acre) biological Site of Special Scientific Interest in Gloucestershire, notified in 1974. The site is listed in the 'Cotswold District' Local Plan 2001-2011 (on line) as a Key Wildlife Site (KWS).

== Habitat ==
The site is in the north-east of the Cotswolds, and is a relatively small area of deciduous Oak woodland which is managed to coppice-with-standards. It lies on Inferior Oolite of the Jurassic limestone. Whilst the tree type is mainly Oak, there are some Beech and Sycamore. Shrubs include Hazel and Hawthorn. The ground flora is mostly Bramble, Dog's Mercury and Woodruff.

== Rarities ==
The site was designated as it supported a large population of Mezereon which is nationally rare. Other uncommon species are Spurge and Butcher's Broom.

A Natural England assessment report of March 2012 states that the Mezereum cannot be located, having been declining over several years, and it is considered that the site is no longer suitable for this plant. As a consequence a recommendation has been made for de-notification.

== SSSI Source ==
- Natural England SSSI information on the citation
- Natural England SSSI information on the Lark Wood unit
