= Skylark Group =

Indian poultry and food processing company

Skylark Group Limited
- Type: Private Limited; Subsidiary of Skylark Group
- Founded: 1985; 41 years ago
- Founder: Jagbir Singh Dhull & Jasbir Deswal
- Headquarters: Kherakhemawati, Safidon, Jind, Haryana, India
- Key people: Jagbir singh MD, Saurabh Deswal; Business Head,
- Products: Broilers, layer, processed meat, eggs, animal feeds
- Total assets: ▲₹ 50 billion (2018)
- Number of employees: 3000 (2018)

Skylark Foods Limited is a subsidiary of Skylark Group, an Indian company that specialises in chicken and meat processing, and poultry products for poultry usage. It holds the same position in North India as Venky's holds in South India.

== History ==
Founded in 1985 in village Anta, Distt. Jind, Haryana as Skylark Poultry Farms by the Dhull and Deswal family, it mainly produced day-old layer and broiler chicks for the poultry markets of North India. Skylark started its first operation with broiler breeding & hatchery with a capacity of 1000 broiler breeders.

== Milestones ==
Year	Milestone
1980	Started broiler commercial farming (with 700 chicks)
1985	Broiler Breeding & Hatchery (with 1000 PS)
2000	Start contract broiler farming (with 20000 birds)
2000	Poultry equipment
2002	Layer breeding & Hatchery
2003	Poultry feed plant
2006	Poultry processing plant
2008	Broiler farming (Automatic)
2010	Grand Parent Operation
2012	Feed production plant at Pilani, Rajasthan
2013	Agri operation in West Africa with PAGL
2014	Started Feed production plant in Purnia (Bihar) & Nepal
2015	Layer Ops in South India
2018	50% share Garinno Global Skylark Sunline Myanmar
2019	Soy Solvex Plant Ujjain
2020	Fish Feed, Cattle Feed, Nugget Raja, ANTA

== Products ==
Skylark mainly produce poultry products, including both food products and poultry farming equipment and feed

=== Poultry sales ===
Skylark markets fresh chilled and frozen chicken in institutions and retail segments in different pack sizes under brand name "Nutrich" in North India. Their products range includes whole chicken, chicken boneless (breast & thigh), drumsticks, full legs, wings, lollipops etc. Their clients include retail stores, commercial kitchens, and franchisees outlets. The processing plant of Skylark is at Food Park, HSIIDC Industrial Estate, RAI, Haryana which is near Delhi.

=== Hatching and breeding ===
The company has separate hatcheries for Grand Parent, Parent Stock and commercials at 5 different locations in Haryana, Himachal Pradesh and Gujarat. Skylark have as well established a distribution network for the sale of DOC's / hatching eggs in Haryana Punjab, Himachal Pradesh, Uttar Pradesh, Gujarat, Rajasthan states.

Skylark is the largest producer of broilers in North India. Skylark has a capacity of about 3 million broilers per month which is a huge number as compared to other broiler companies in India.

Skylark have a poultry feed mill in Jind district and has a production capacity of 800 tonnes per day. It was established in 2003. This mill produce feed for G.P., Parent Stock, Layer Stock and commercial broiler farming having their respective starters and finishers range.

Skylark provides technical assistance to farmers via a disease diagnostic laboratory at Jind, Haryana.
