= Perfect Son =

- Promotional poster
- Genre: Comedy; Family
- Written by: Shinji Nojima
- Directed by: Noriyoshi Sakuma; Satoru Nakajima; Masahiro Mori
- Starring: Ryosuke Yamada; Kyōka Suzuki; Taisuke Fujigaya; Yuto Nakajima
- Ending theme: "SUPER DELICATE" by Hey! Say! JUMP
- Composer: Masaru Yokoyama
- Country of origin: Japan
- Original language: Japanese
- No. of seasons: 1
- No. of episodes: 10

Production
- Producers: Eriko Mikami; Yuta Fukui; Hiroshi Matsubara; Kuniko Yanai
- Production locations: Tokyo, Japan
- Running time: Saturday at (UTC+09:00) 09:00p.m. JST

Original release
- Network: NTV
- Release: 14 January – 17 March 2012

Related
- Human Monster Bem; Mikeneko Holmes no Suiri

Perfect Son (理想の息子, Risō no Musuko) is comedy-drama television series starring Hey! Say! JUMP's Ryosuke Yamada and Kyōka Suzuki, which aired on NTV from 21:00-21:54 on Saturday nights from January 14, 2012 to March 17, 2012. The screenplay was written by Shinji Nojima.

== Synopsis ==
Having led a life of misfortune and having had no luck with men in her life, Umi Suzuki (Kyoka Suzuki) has one tremendous expectation for her son Daichi (Ryosuke Yamada): “It’s payback time and my son is going to make up for all of my past misery!” Umi has played the role of a mother, but has secretly manipulated Daichi to become the “Perfect Son” who cares more about his mom than anyone else. Daichi, not knowing anything about her unspoken plan, has actually grown up to become a completely new type of “mama’s boy” who is so honest that he is not embarrassed to say out loud, “My mom is the most important person in the whole world.” Much to Umi’s delight, Daichi is accepted at a prestigious high school.

One day, Umi begins a new part-time job. However, when Daichi finds out that her new workplace is a high-school cafeteria full of villainous boys, he suddenly quits his elite high school and transfers to this notorious one in order to protect his mom, which leads to the collapse of Umi’s “perfect” scenario.

This intelligent, honest and sweet “perfect son” sometimes exceeds Umi’s expectations as he tries to please his mom too much.

== Character Description ==
Daichi Suzuki
The son of Umi Suzuki who has been raised to be the “Perfect Son”. He is good-looking, has excellent grades, and is pure and honest. Originally from the prestigious Meifu Private School, he moves to Sea King Public High School to look after his mother.
Umi Suzuki
The mother of Daichi Suzuki and works at Sea King Public High School. She has raised her son with the secret goal of having him buy her a house in the future.
Kengo Mifune
The leader of the Sea King Public High School students and has a potential to become a well-known boxer. He was abandoned by his mother during his childhood days thus depicting a rare attachment to Umi Suzuki.
Koji Kobayashi
Heir of Marukoba Construction, he befriends Daichi Suzuki. He is a coward student and jealous of Daichi’s kind-hearted character.

== Cast ==
Main Cast

- Ryosuke Yamada as Daichi Suzuki
- Kyōka Suzuki as Umi Suzuki
- Taisuke Fujigaya as Kengo Mifune
- Yuto Nakajima as Kouji Kobayashi

Extended cast

- Anju Suzuki as Mitsuko Kobayashi
- Ikki Sawamura as Minoru Kurahashi
- Risa Sudo as Honda Kayoko
- Masayo Umezawa as Nishida
- Masako Miyaji as Ota
- Rie Hagiwara as Yoshida
- Ayaka Miyoshi as Sayaka Tanba

Sea King Public High School

- Kouhei Takeda as Goro Uchiyama
- Kendo Kobayashi as Toshio Kanbe (Homeroom/Physical Education Teacher)
- Nobuaki Kaneko as Fuyuhiko Ikeda (Art teacher)
- Tomohiro Waki as Iwao Tanba
- Jingi Irie as Yuma Wanikawa
- Tokio Emoto as Yoshikazu Habu
- Daisuke Moromizato as Zoubayashi Tomoyuki
- Jun Yoshinaga as Masako Hyouzuka

Guest

- Kenji Anan as Masako's Father [Episode 5]
- Nobuaki Kaneko as Yugo Suzuki [Episode 6-7]
- Kento Hayashi as Kinoo [Episode 6-7]
- RED RICE as Junpei Handa [Episode 7]
- Shunsuke Kazuma as Taka Tennouji [Episode 8]
- Nobuaki Kaneko as Hiroyuki Shinoda [Episode 8-9]
- Anna Ishibashi as Sora Shinoda [Episode 8-10]

== Soundtrack ==
=== Theme song ===
The theme song of the drama was provided by Hey! Say! JUMP titled "SUPER DELICATE". The lyrics were written by Shinji Nojima, who also wrote the script for the drama.

=== Original soundtrack ===
The drama's original soundtrack was released on February 22, 2012 the same day that "SUPER DELICATE" was released. Music was composed by Masaru Yokoyama.

Risou no Musuko: Original sound track

Soundtrack album
- Released: February 22, 2012
- Label: VAP

Original track listing
No.	Title	Length
1.	"Risou No Musuko Sanka Dai Ichi Gakushou"
2.	"Risou Toha"
3.	"Onbu.Dakko"
4.	"Risou No Musuko Sanka Dai Ni Gakushou"
5.	"Gangan Ikouze"
6.	"Ie Wo Kae"
7.	"Kaachan"
8.	"Itsumo No Kanji"
9.	"Bosei Honnou Dake Ja.."
10.	"Koushite Iretara"
11.	"Semari Kuru Aratana Nanika"
12.	"Safari Highschool"
13.	"Ichinan Satte Mata Ichinan"
14.	"Teka.Ie Wo Kae"
15.	"Shinjitsu To Ura No Ura"
16.	"Gokuaku Lullaby"
17.	"Ikinari Runaway"
18.	"Aku No Soukutsu"
19.	"Saigo No Seisen"
20.	"Keisei Gyakuten No Yotei"
21.	"Haha.Musuko"
22.	"Sonna Koto Iwanaide"
23.	"Kawaranai Kara"
24.	"Hitori Bocchi No Shokuji"
25.	"Yobareta Ki Ga Shite"
26.	"Risou No Musuko Sanka Dai San Gakushou"
27.	"Risou No Musuko Koushinkyoku"

== Episodes ==
Episode	Airing Date	Title	Director	Ratings (Kanto)
1	January 14, 2012	Evil mother VS mother-complex son	Noriyoshi Sakuma	13.9%
2	January 21, 2012	Son's heart is of a woman!? At that time, the mother...	Noriyoshi Sakuma	12.4%
3	January 18, 2012	I'll show you that I can say it!! Old hag!!	Masahiro Mori	14.0%
4	February 4, 2012	A prayer to God to escape from poverty! Zou-san's blue bird	Noriyoshi Sakuma	11.0%
5	February 11, 2012	A fierce fight! Father-complex VS mother-complex!!	Satoru Nakajima	11.2%
6	February 18, 2012	Mom's got a new lover!? Pack of wolves attack the academy	Noriyoshi Sakuma	10.6%
7	February 25, 2012	The father who came to pick him up! Panda attacks the academy	Satoru Nakajima	12.3%
8	March 3, 2012	Raising him was a loss!? Confused son's ultimate choice	Noriyoshi Sakuma	10.0%
9	March 10, 2012	Son's got a girlfriend!? Mom is an evil mother-in-law?	Masahiro Mori	10.7%
10	March 17, 2012	Opposition to marriage!! Mother VS son final holy war	Noriyoshi Sakuma	12.5%
Average viewing ratings: 11.9%

== Production staff ==
- Screenwriter: Shinji Nojima
- Producers: Eriko Mikami, Yuta Fukui (福井雄太), Hiroshi Matsubara, Kuniko Yanai (柳内久仁子)
- Directors: Noriyoshi Sakuma, Satoru Nakajima, Masahiro Mori
- Music: Masaru Yokoyama (横山克)
