= McMillan Hotels =

Scottish hotel chain

- Industry: Hospitality
- Founded: 1961
- Founder: Hammy McMillan
- Headquarters: Stranraer, Scotland
- Website: www.mcmillanhotels.co.uk

McMillan Hotels is a hotel chain based in Stranraer, Scotland. The hotel group has a portfolio of 3 hotels across Scotland, operating in the three and four star sector.

== History ==
The hotel group was initially created after hotelier Hammy McMillan decided to renovate the North West Castle in his hometown of Stranraer in 1961. It later became the first hotel in the world with an indoor curling ice rink, and continues to welcome curlers from all over the world.

Today, the hotel group continues to be owned and run by the McMillan family. The hotel group is involved in local weddings and events, and in curling and golf. North West Castle hosts curling events throughout the season from October to April. Cally Palace Hotel & Golf course has an 18-hole parkland golf course. Fernhill Hotel has views over the village and harbour of Portpatrick.

== Portfolio ==
The group consists of hotels across the south-west of Scotland, including hotels in Dumfries and Galloway, such as the 18th century home of Sir John Ross, North West Castle, as well as the 'Category A' listed building Cally Palace, which was acquired in 1981. and Fernhill Hotel in nearby Portpatrick Fernhill Hotel in Portpatrick.
