= List of Toradora! episodes =

Cover art of the first DVD compilation released by King Records, featuring main characters Ryūji Takasu and Taiga Aisaka

Toradora! is an anime television series adapted from the light novel series of the same title written by Yuyuko Takemiya and illustrated by Yasu. The series was directed by Tatsuyuki Nagai and produced by J.C.Staff, Masayoshi Tanaka serving as the character designer and Mari Okada serving as the primary scriptwriter. The series follows Ryūji Takasu, a high school student whose eyes make him look like an intimidating delinquent, and Taiga Aisaka, a diminutive girl in his class who is known for her negative attitude towards nearly everyone. The two of them spend their days of high school with their three close friends named Minori Kushieda, Yūsaku Kitamura and Ami Kawashima.

Toradora! was broadcast on TV Tokyo from October 2, 2008, to March 26, 2009. It also aired on TV Osaka and TV Aichi simultaneously, and with a delay on TV Hokkaido, TV Setouchi, TVQ Kyushu Broadcasting, AT-X, and Kagoshima Television. King Records released the series in eight Region 2 DVD compilations between January 21, 2009, and August 26, 2009. The first DVD contained four episodes while the other seven DVDs contained three episodes each. Limited editions of all eight compilations, each containing a bonus CD, were also released. The second DVD contained an extra short, Toradora SOS! Hurray for Foodies (とらドラSOS！食いしん坊万々歳, Toradora SOS! Kuishinbō Banbanzai). A Blu-ray Disc collection containing an original video animation episode was released on December 21, 2011.

The series makes use of four pieces of theme music: two opening and two ending themes. The opening theme for the first 16 episodes is titled "Pre-Parade" (プレパレード, Pureparēdo) performed by Rie Kugimiya, Eri Kitamura, and Yui Horie. The first ending theme is "Vanilla Salt" (バニラソルト, Banira Soruto), also performed by Horie. The opening for the rest of the series is "Silky Heart" performed once again by Yui Horie, and the second ending is "Orange" (オレンジ, Orenji) performed by Rie Kugimiya, Eri Kitamura, and Horie. The original score for Toradora! was composed and arranged by Yukari Hashimoto. The soundtrack album was released on January 7, 2009.

== Episode list ==
=== Toradora! ===
No.	Title	Directed by	Written by	Original release date
1	"Tiger and Dragon"; Transliteration: "Tora to Ryū" (Japanese: 虎と竜)	Tatsuyuki Nagai	Mari Okada	October 2, 2008
Ryūji Takasu, discontent about how his eyes make him look like an intimidating delinquent, prepares for the first day of his second year of high school. On the way to class, he bumps into Taiga Aisaka, a diminutive girl known for her fierce temper, who is in the same class as him by coincidence. After class, Taiga accidentally puts a love letter in Ryūji's bag, which was meant for Ryūji's best friend Yūsaku Kitamura instead. Taiga later comes to Ryūji's house that night to kill him for knowing about her secret, but Ryūji tells Taiga the envelope was empty. Ryūji reveals he has a love interest for his classmate Minori Kushieda, who is Taiga's best friend. To calm Taiga down, Ryūji tells her he will do anything to help her with Yūsaku. The next morning, Ryūji discovers Taiga lives in an apartment building next door to his house. When he visits her, he cleans the kitchen and serves her breakfast.
2	"Ryūji and Taiga"; Transliteration: "Ryūji to Taiga" (Japanese: 竜児と大河)	Kenichi Kasai	Mari Okada	October 9, 2008
During basketball warm-up exercises, Ryūji and Taiga pair up as partners, in which Taiga plans to become paired with Yūsaku after Ryūji knocks out Yūsaku's partner with a basketball. When Ryūji realizes his classmate Maya Kihara is Yūsaku's partner, he knocks out Taiga instead. Later, Taiga attempts to catch up to Yūsaku and give him a bag of cookies she made. However, she slips off the stairs and throws the bag out of the window in the process, while Ryūji breaks her fall. After she recovers the bag, Ryūji happily eats the cookies. Since Ryūji and Taiga are often together, their classmates mistake the two as a couple, much to Taiga's anger. The next day, Taiga tries to set the record straight and confesses her love to Yūsaku. Ryūji, who overhears Taiga being rejected by Yūsaku, vows to be strong enough like a "dragon" to stand by Taiga as a "tiger".
3	"Your Song"; Transliteration: "Kimi no Uta" (Japanese: 君の歌)	Eiichi Kuboyama	Mari Okada	October 16, 2008
Ryūji and Taiga observe Minori playing at the softball field and later decorating cellphones for her classmates, much to Ryūji's amazement. After Ryūji's rice cooker breaks, Taiga takes him to a nearby family diner, where Minori, working part-time as a waitress, serves them sundaes. Minori tells him she has several part-time jobs, but he later wonders if there is a reason why Minori needs money. The next day, Ryūji and Taiga run into Minori at a liquor store, another one of her part-time jobs. The boss asks Ryūji and Taiga to help out for the day, despite Taiga wanting to back down from the start. Taiga is ordered to carry three cases of beer by bicycle, having to push the bicycle along the road due to the inability to ride it. Meanwhile, Ryūji and Minori get locked inside the storehouse, and Ryūji learns Minori is often so cheerful because she faces her fears.
4	"That Moment's Expression"; Transliteration: "Ano Toki no Kao" (Japanese: あのときの顔)	Katsushi Sakurabi	Mari Okada	October 23, 2008
After viewing some blurred images that Taiga took of Yūsaku, Ryūji offers to take pictures of him for Taiga. During a school assembly, Taiga speaks out to the student council president Sumire Kano for treating the students like an army, but is stopped by Yūsaku, causing her to become both happy and depressed. Minori and Yūsaku suggest Ryūji and Taiga to join them for lunch, which causes a tense moment between the latter two. Both Yūsaku and Minori are summoned to softball practice, during which Ryūji manages to take several photos of Yūsaku. Taiga has a hard time choosing which of the photos should be laminated, and she gives all of them to Ryūji. When Yūsaku discovers Ryūji looking over the photos, Yūsaku shows Ryūji a photo of Taiga in his handbook, revealing that she turned him down after he confessed to her a year ago. Taiga later recounts this to Ryūji, telling him she began to develop feelings for Yūsaku ever since then.
5	"Ami Kawashima"; Transliteration: "Kawashima Ami" (Japanese: かわしまあみ)	Katsuya Asano	Tatsuto Higuchi	October 30, 2008
At the family diner, Yūsaku arrives with fashion model Ami Kawashima, who is also his childhood friend. When Yūsaku and Ryūji excuse themselves, Yūsaku shows Ryūji that Ami is really a conceited and manipulative person, different from her being a self-proclaimed "airhead". Taiga soon comes to dislike Ami, even to the point of slapping her in the family diner. Ami transfers into Ryūji and Taiga's class, quickly becoming popular with her classmates and maintaining her airhead personality. Although Ami tries to flirt with Ryūji, he can see right through her facade. Ami tries to convince Taiga that Yūsaku hates her because of how she acted in the family diner, but Ryūji later finds Taiga at her house to assure her is not the case.
6	"True Self"; Transliteration: "Honto no Jibun" (Japanese: ほんとの自分)	Shigeru Yamazaki	Mari Okada	November 6, 2008
In order to avoid a male stalker, Ami is forced to take refuge in Taiga's apartment, much to Ami's fright. Yūsaku asks Taiga and Ryūji to be better friends with Ami since they know what type of person she really is. Ryūji, Taiga, Minori and Ami volunteer to take part in the student council's monthly neighborhood cleaning rally. After Taiga and Minori leave together, Ryūji tells Ami to be herself and stop acting like an airhead. Just as it begins to rain, Ami takes Ryūji with her to hide after she spots the stalker. When Taiga and Minori return, the stalker tries to take photos of Taiga, but she gets angry and chases him down. Empowered by Taiga's actions, Ami decides to discard her fake personality. Ami finds the stalker as the rain lets up and destroys his camera, causing him to run away in fear.
7	"Pool Opening"; Transliteration: "Pūru Biraki" (Japanese: プールびらき)	Sayo Aoi	Junko Okazaki	November 13, 2008
Because the school swimming pool has finally opened for the summer, Ryūji accompanies Taiga, Minori and Ami to the mall to buy swimsuits. Although Ami and Minori easily pick out their swimsuits, Taiga has trouble picking out hers. After realizing that Taiga has a small bust size, Ryūji decides to add paddings to her swimsuit to fix the problem. At the swimming pool, Minori and Yūsaku throw Ryūji into the swimming pool, so Ami does the same thing to Taiga. When it turns out that Taiga cannot swim, Ryūji goes in to save her, having to put back in a padding that fell out of her swimsuit, much to Taiga's embarrassment. Back at the classroom, while Ryūji hears Taiga and Ami having an argument, Minori interrupts the two, telling them to settle things with a sports competition.
8	"For Whose Sake?"; Transliteration: "Dare no Tame" (Japanese: だれのため)	Tōru Ishida	Junko Okazaki	November 20, 2008
Taiga and Ami must compete in a fifty-meter swimming race. Ryūji tries to encourage Taiga to practice in the swimming pool, but she prefers to practice virtually. Taiga later refuses to participate in the race after Ryūji assumes how she really feels about the competition. However, Taiga decides to show up last minute on the day of the competition. Taiga has a leg cramp during the race, and Ryūji jumps into the swimming pool to stop her from continuing. He lets her go to push for the lead after she declares that she wants to win this for him. When a few boys are pushed into the swimming pool, Ryūji is knocked out, prompting Taiga to turn around and save him, thereby losing the race. Ryūji wakes up surrounded by all the students, and a shaken Taiga yells out that Ryūji is hers. Although Ami planned on taking Ryūji to her beach house alone as a result of winning the race, Taiga, Minori and Yūsaku insist on tagging along.
9	"Let's Go to the Ocean, You Say."; Transliteration: "Umi ni Ikō to Kimi wa" (Japanese: 海にいこうと君は)	Katsushi Sakurabi	Tatsuto Higuchi	November 27, 2008
Ryūji and Taiga hold a badminton contest to determine who will support the other side. After Ryūji wins, Taiga agrees to help him with a plan to get Minori closer to him by instilling her with fear. Ryūji, Taiga, Minori, Yūsaku and Ami travel by train to the beach house, where Ryūji cleans inside while the others hang out at the beach. Minori and Yūsaku go to the grocery store, while Ryūji and Taiga are each deceived by Ami when she runs the shower. The five of them later have spicy curry for dinner. Yūsaku gives Taiga some stomach medicine, and Ryūji helps Minori with the dishes. Ryūji talks with Minori, who compares the belief of ghosts with the concept of love and questions if both are real. Later, Ryūji finds strands of hair, and Taiga finds a dress, both covered with slimy seaweed on their beds. They become scared when they hear banging from the bedroom doors leading to the hallway and balcony.
10	"Fireworks"; Transliteration: "Hanabi" (Japanese: 花火)	Kenichi Kasai	Tatsuto Higuchi	December 4, 2008
Ryūji and Taiga stay up all night, still unsure of what had occurred the night before. Yūsaku and Ami both eventually agree to assist Ryūji and Taiga with a plan to terrify Minori. After the five of them have a breakfast picnic at the beach, they take a walk through a hidden cave filled with traps, though Ryūji and Ami perceive these traps as pathetic use of tofu and ketchup. Ryūji and Ami later witness as Minori, Yūsaku and Taiga each momentarily disappear at the end of the cave. However, it turns out that Minori and Yūsaku were playing a trick on Ryūji and Taiga, and that they were the ones who put the strands of hair and dress covered in seaweed in the bedrooms. Minori was fully aware of what Ryūji and Taiga were up to, but she appreciates them for giving her a thrill. Ryūji and Minori tell each other that they wanted to make the other believe that ghosts are real.
11	"Ōhashi High School Cultural Festival (Part One)"; Transliteration: "Ōhashi Kōkō Bunkasai (Zenpen)" (Japanese: 大橋高校文化祭 (前編))	Keiichi Hashimoto	Masahiro Yokotani	December 11, 2008
The high school is undergoing preparations for the upcoming cultural festival hosted by the student council. The boys are excited to try to stack their votes towards a cosplay cafe, but classmate Kōji Haruta draws a professional wrestling theme. The class chooses Taiga to be their representative for the school's beauty queen contest. Meanwhile, Taiga tries to ignore phone calls from her father, Rikuro Aisaka, but when she discovers that her expense account has been emptied, she sends Ryūji in her place to a restaurant to talk to him. Rikuro explains that due to Taiga's stepmother being a lot younger than him, Taiga left his house because she could not handle such a lifestyle. However, Rikuro plans to divorce Taiga's stepmother in order to live with Taiga like the old days. Kōji creates a skit for the whole class to accommodate for the theme, while Yūsaku announces four prizes that will be awarded to the class with the best performance. Taiga is infuriated when she sees Rikuro standing outside her apartment, but Ryūji eventually manages to calm Taiga down and persuades her to talk to Rikuro.
12	"Ōhashi High School Cultural Festival (Part Two)"; Transliteration: "Ōhashi Kōkō Bunkasai (Chūhen)" (Japanese: 大橋高校文化祭 (中編))	Daisuke Takashima	Mari Okada	December 18, 2008
After a dress rehearsal for the play, Taiga starts to reconnect with Rikuro, who begins selling away items in her apartment under the rationale that they can move out and live together somewhere else. Taiga later tries to bribe Ami with a box of sweets in exchange for the lead role. Minori argues with Ryūji, saying that Taiga should not have anything to do with Rikuro. As Taiga tries to calm things down, an angry Ryūji walks away until Ami talks him into attending the next dress rehearsal. At night, Taiga suggests that Ryūji should apologize to Minori. The next day, the high school starts the cultural festival. After the professional wrestling show is performed by the class, Ryūji hesitates to apologize to Minori, while Taiga constantly waits for Rikuro to contact her. The professional wrestling show turns out to be a success, even though Taiga did not get a chance to play the lead role.
13	"Ōhashi High School Cultural Festival (Finale)"; Transliteration: "Ōhashi Kōkō Bunkasai (Kōhen)" (Japanese: 大橋高校文化祭 (後篇))	Masahito Otani	Mari Okada	December 25, 2008
The class holds a beauty pageant for the cultural festival, in which Ami hosts the event dressed as a dominatrix. Ryūji receives a text message from Rikuro saying he will not be able to live with Taiga. Despite being deeply saddened that her father Rikuro did not show up, Taiga wins the beauty pageant. A race is held for the male students to determine who will dance with Taiga. Determined to win the race, Ryūji uses various shortcuts to get past and step over most of the other participants. Near the end of the race, Minori, the only female participant, knocks down the remaining male participants to provide an opportunity for Ryūji to win. However, he takes her hand, and they cross the finish line together. At a bonfire outside the high school, Ryūji and Minori reconcile, before all the students dance the night away.
14	"The Palmtop Tiger of Happiness"; Transliteration: "Shiawase no Tenori Taigā" (Japanese: しあわせの手乗りタイガー)	Toshiaki Miki	Mari Okada	January 8, 2009
A rumor is spread around the high school that anyone who touches Taiga will be granted one wish of happiness, much to Taiga's irritation. When pictures of the cultural festival are displayed for sale, Minori notices Ryūji buying a picture of them crossing the finish line holding hands, and she decides to buy it as a keepsake. Yuri Koigakubo, the homeroom teacher, compliments Ami as being mature and refined for noticing her wearing a cardigan from a model catalog. Ami hangs out with Maya and Nanako Kashii, who both say the same thing as well. However, after Ami bumps into Ryūji at a market, she declines his offer of some extra pork he bought, and she is surprised when he tells her that she behaves like a child. While Yūsaku contemplates after Sumire tells him something, Taiga runs into him and tries to comfort him. At night, Yasuko Takasu, Ryūji's mother, boasts that Taiga is now a part of the family. Ryūji, Ami, Minori and Yūsaku each wonder what they would wish for since they all had the chance of touching Taiga.
15	"The Stars Are Far"; Transliteration: "Hoshi wa, Tōku" (Japanese: 星は, 遠く)	Tōru Ishida	Tatsuto Higuchi	January 15, 2009
When news about the elections for the new student council president is announced, Yūsaku flips out in the middle of class and declares that he will quit the student council. All the students try to figure out what is wrong with Yūsaku, especially when he shows up to school the next day with his hair dyed blonde. Ryūji walks home with Minori while having a conversation about Ami's odd reaction towards Yūsaku's behavior. Ryūji arrives at his house to see Taiga, only for them to find Yūsaku, who ran away from his house. Yūsaku spends time with Ryūji and Taiga, having dinner and playing video games before bedtime. They hang out at a batting cage the next day before returning home, where Yasuko attempts to dye his hair back to black, scaring him into running back to his house. In order to motivate Yūsaku to participate in the elections, Taiga decides to compete as a student council president candidate.
16	"One Step Forward"; Transliteration: "Fumidasu Ippo" (Japanese: 踏み出す一歩)	Katsushi Sakurabi	Tatsuto Higuchi	January 22, 2009
Ryūji helps Taiga run her campaign for the elections for the week. Ryūji discovers that Yūsaku has a crush on Sumire, but is upset that she is planning to study abroad in America to be an astronaut. On the last day of the elections, Yūsaku returns to school with his hair back to normal and receives encouragement from Sumire to apply as a candidate. During a school assembly, he confesses his love to Sumire in front of all of the students, but she ignore this and declares him the new student council president. Taiga later becomes outraged and attacks Sumire, but Ryūji manages to arrive and break up the fight. Sumire admits to withholding her feelings for Yūsaku because she did not want him to sacrifice everything for her, but Yūsaku states that he is glad that he fell in love with her. Two days later, Sumire leaves to study abroad while Taiga is suspended from school for two weeks.
17	"Mercury Retrogrades at Christmas"; Transliteration: "Kurisumasu ni Suisei wa Gyakkōsuru" (Japanese: クリスマスに水星は逆行する)	Yōhei Suzuki	Masahiro Yokotani	January 29, 2009
Taiga is joyful for Christmas to be right around the corner and for her school suspension to be lifted. Since Ryūji has not progressed in his relationship with Minori, Taiga decides to play Cupid for him since she wants to be good for Santa Claus. At school the next morning, students become fans of Taiga after her victorious fight against Sumire. Ryūji and Taiga head to class, only to see Minori wearing a bald wig while speaking nonsense. Yūsaku arrives and lies face down in front of Taiga in admiration for her actions to help his relationship with Sumire. Later, Yūsaku announces that the student council will organize a Christmas Eve party to boost romantic feelings among students. Minori vehemently declines an invitation to the party, which causes Ryūji and Taiga to become concerned, especially when she does not show up for work at the family diner. Ryūji and Taiga are joined by Yūsaku, Maya, Kōji and Hisamitsu Noto, who pairs Taiga and Yūsaku at another table to get drinks. When Maya points out that Ryūji should be with Taiga, he ponders whether or not Taiga and Yūsaku should be a couple.
18	"Under the Fir Tree"; Transliteration: "Momi no Ki no Shita de" (Japanese: もみの木の下で)	Daisuke Takashima	Masahiro Yokotani	February 5, 2009
While all of the students are decorating the school gymnasium for the party, Ami tells Ryūji that he should reconsider his unnatural relationship with Taiga, akin to a paternal bond between father and daughter. After the final exam, Ryūji helps Taiga mail a bunch of presents to her parents and some orphaned children. Later, all of the students work together to assemble a large artificial Christmas tree topped with Taiga's precious glass star. However, a stray softball crashes through the school gymnasium window, knocking over the Christmas tree and smashing the glass star. Minori enters the school gymnasium with deep regret, forcing it upon herself to glue the broken glass star back together, but Ryūji helps her out despite her protests. Once the glass star is fixed and the Christmas tree is reassembled, Minori apologizes and leaves after declining another invitation to the party, due to feeling unwelcome after the accident, but Ryūji promises her that he will wait for her.
19	"Christmas Eve Festival"; Transliteration: "Seiyasai" (Japanese: 聖夜祭)	Kenichi Kasai	Masahiro Yokotani	February 12, 2009
Ryūji and Taiga attend the party dressed in formal attire. After Yūsaku gets the party started, Taiga and Ami perform a duet on stage. Ami later informs Ryūji that Taiga left to visit Minori in order to convince her to come to the party. Taiga then decides to go home and wait for Santa Claus. Ryūji comes to Taiga dressed in a bear costume with a Santa Claus outfit to cheer her up. Taiga urges Ryūji to return to the party and wait for Minori, but when he finally leaves, Taiga soon realizes that she will no longer be by his side. Taiga cries out for Ryūji, unaware that Minori is standing nearby. When Minori meets Ryūji outside the high school, she tells him that she no longer wishes to see UFOs and ghosts, referencing their conversation at the beach house, before leaving. He collapses shortly after understanding that she rejected him.
20	"Forever Like This"; Transliteration: "Zutto, Kono Mama" (Japanese: ずっと, このまま)	Noriaki Saitō	Tatsuto Higuchi	February 19, 2009
Taiga decides to stop visiting Ryūji at his house, which would help him concentrate on getting closer to Minori. Yuri informs her homeroom students that the field trip will be at a ski lodge in the mountains, since the seaside resort booked in Okinawa was burned to the ground. While hanging out with Ami, Taiga points out that this will be Ryūji's last chance to confirm Minori's feelings before classes are rearranged. Ryūji later catches up with Minori, and Taiga provides an opportunity for the two to start talking again. Ryūji, Taiga, Minori, Yūsaku, Ami, Maya, Nanako, Kōji and Hisamitsu meet up at Taiga's apartment to discuss plans for the field trip. In the kitchen, Minori praises Ryūji for the way Taiga has become. Minori wishes that things would stay the same forever, while Ryūji becomes determined to confess to her properly.
21	"No Matter What"; Transliteration: "Dōshitatte" (Japanese: どうしたって)	Sayo Aoi	Masahiro Yokotani	February 26, 2009
At the ski lodge, Hisamitsu has a fight with Maya. Minori later explains to Ryūji that Hisamitsu does not want Maya to get close to Yūsaku since Taiga already likes Yūsaku. After Yūsaku, Kōji and Hisamitsu learn that Ryūji has a crush on Minori, the boys enter the empty girls' bedroom and hide in the closet when Taiga appears, but Ryūji ends up pulling her in as well when Minori, Ami, Maya and Nanako arrive. While gossiping about whether Taiga loves either Ryūji or Yūsaku, Ami purposely brings up that Minori rejected Ryūji. The next day, Taiga and Minori ride on a sled and run into Ami by accident. When Ami believes this to be on purpose, she engages in a fight against Minori. Taiga notices that Minori dropped her hairpin on a nearby slope and runs off by herself to look for it. A blizzard occurs and Taiga does not return, which leaves Ryūji, Minori and Yūsaku to go out and search for her. Ryūji manages to find her at the bottom of the hill badly injured. As Ryūji carries her on his back, Taiga wakes up in a haze, believing that she is speaking to Yūsaku and confessing that she is in love with Ryūji.
22	"The Scene With You"; Transliteration: "Kimi no Iru Keshiki" (Japanese: 君のいる景色)	Tōru Ishida	Mari Okada	March 5, 2009
After the field trip, Taiga is staying with her mother and has not come back to school. Ryūji asks Yūsaku to take credit for being the one who saved Taiga in order to cover up her confession. Later, Kōji and Hisamitsu take Ryūji to a ramen shop, where Minori has started another part time job. At home, Ryūji bemoans the fact he is not able to afford further education, but Yasuko tells him he should aim for the best. At school the next day, Minori tries to convince Ami that she knows what to do and find out what is real. Ryūji goes home after school and realizes that Yasuko has a second part-time job at a local bakery shop. He stores a hairpin he bought back in a box, knowing that he would not be able to give it to Minori. He is surprised when Taiga shows up at his doorstep, where she admits that she skipped school to spend time with her mother. Taiga notices the hairpin in the box and reassures him not to worry. Taiga tells him that she had a dream about what occurred during the blizzard, wondering if it really happened. Ryūji tells her that Yūsaku really did save her, but the things she said were just a part of the dream.
23	"The Road That We Must Advance On"; Transliteration: "Susumu Beki Michi" (Japanese: 進むべき道)	Yōhei Suzuki	Mari Okada	March 12, 2009
Yuri is concerned that Ryūji does not plan to go to college and Taiga is uninterested in a career. After hearing that Ami refuses to model the school uniform, Ryūji learns that she decided to stay at the high school longer to help Taiga. Ryūji gets a call from Taiga saying that Yasuko had collapsed due to anemia from overworking. Ryūji and Taiga decide to fill in for Yasuko by selling chocolates outside the local bakery shop, where Kōji, Hisamitsu and Ami pass by. With Valentine's Day coming up, Taiga decides to give some homemade chocolates for her friends after school as thanks for the things they have done for her. However, when Taiga is once again told Yūsaku rescued her from the blizzard instead of Ryūji, Minori becomes angry at the lie and tries to get Taiga to admit her true feelings. Taiga says that she just wants Minori to be happy, but Minori says that happiness is something only she can decide for herself, which causes Taiga to run away. Minori, deciding to go after Taiga, asks Ryūji to accompany her.
24	"Confession"; Transliteration: "Kokuhaku" (Japanese: 告白)	Katsushi Sakurabi	Mari Okada	March 19, 2009
Ryūji decides to accompany Minori, who admits that she held back her feelings for Ryūji because of her friendship with Taiga. However, Taiga escapes before Ryūji and Minori manage to reach her school locker. At the local bakery shop, Ryūji and Taiga agree to talk after their work shift, but they are confronted by Yasuko and Taiga's mother about their future plans. Ryūji and Taiga flee to a bridge to talk about their current situations, and Taiga tells Ryūji that she needs him by her side. With that in mind, Ryūji and Taiga discuss plans to elope. At Ami's house, Ryūji and Taiga meet up with Minori, Yūsaku and Ami. Despite disagreeing with their plans to elope, Minori, Yūsaku and Ami decide to support Ryūji and Taiga. Ryūji goes home, only to find that Yasuko has run away, leaving a note instructing him to go to his grandparents' house. The next morning, Ryūji and Taiga board a train, but instead of eloping, the two go to his grandparents' house. Ryūji introduces himself as their grandson and Taiga as his bride.
25	"Toradora!"; Transliteration: "Toradora!" (Japanese: とらドラ!)	Tatsuyuki Nagai	Mari Okada	March 26, 2009
Yasuko rushes over to see Ryūji at the house of his grandparents – her parents – Seiji and Sonoko Takasu. Taiga and Ryūji reveal they left her a voicemail acting as if Ryūji needed help with the aim of getting her to return to her childhood home, thereby helping her make up with her parents after over a decade away. Sonoko tells Yasuko that she raised Ryūji well. That night, Yasuko tells Ryūji that his father abandoned her while she was still pregnant, and that despite others' objections, she still chose to give birth to him and raise him by herself. Ryūji and Taiga decide to marry, sharing their first kisses in their bedroom at night. Ryūji and Taiga (and Yasuko) return to their apartments, but Taiga decides she must leave to fix her own life and family issues, and to make herself worthy for Ryūji. The next morning, Yuri announces to the homeroom students that Taiga is transferring out of their school. Ryūji later receives a text message from her noting that he never said that he loved her. Taiga sends another text to her homeroom classmates with a picture of a single star in the night sky, which encourages them to send a class group photo back to Taiga and wish her luck. A year later, on the day of the homeroom students' graduation ceremony, Ryūji sees Taiga's hair in the window of their classroom. He rushes upstairs to find Taiga hiding in the classroom locker. Ryūji tells Taiga that he loves her, to which she blushes, and instinctively headbutts him for saying it at an anticlimactic moment.
OVA	"The True Meaning of Bento"; Transliteration: "Bentō no Gokui" (Japanese: 弁当の極意)	Tatsuyuki Nagai	Mari Okada	December 21, 2011
Some time after graduation, Taiga is cooking snacks in her new home. Cutting to a flashback to their school days, Yūsaku brings an extravagant bento made by his grandmother Miyo and shares it with the class during lunchtime. After feeling inferior about his bento, Ryūji obsesses over trying to make a better bento. Even when Ryūji tries to bring instant noodles the next time, he is surprised when Yūsaku shows up with an even better instant soup. Since Ryūji ruins Taiga's lunch out of frustration, she decides to visit the family diner after class to eat by herself. The next day, Ryūji cheats by trying to use a rice cooker during class, but he is quickly foiled when the class finds out. Ryūji is upset that Yuri unplugged his rice cooker, so Taiga hands him a container full of onigiri that she had made herself. However, the onigiri turns out to be surprisingly salty. That night, Ryūji makes chazuke with the onigiri to make it more edible. Meanwhile, he realizes that his bento are special because he cares about Taiga, just as Miyo's bento are special because she cares about Yūsaku. Returning from the flashback, Ryūji and Taiga are having a hanami picnic with their friends some time after graduation. Taiga brings with her the snacks she prepared. As Taiga is embarrassed to offer the food to Ryūji and he is embarrassed to accept it, their friends playfully help the couple by forcing her to feed him.

=== Toradora SOS! Hurray for Foodies ===
Toradora SOS! Hurray for Foodies (とらドラSOS！食いしん坊万々歳, Toradora SOS! Kuishinbō Banbanzai) is a collection of DVD exclusive mini-episodes featured on even numbered volume releases of the anime series. In these shorts, the cast are represented as chibis. Ryūji takes Taiga and Ami to the family diner to try out various foods, and he usually competes against Minori to see which dish is the best. There is a recurring gag in which Ryūji gets ignored when he gives boring trivial facts about the food. Moreover, Yūsaku declares each contest as a draw, but no one pays attention to him. Each episode ends with a segment titled "Today's Inko", in which Ryūji's pet bird Inko struggles to say something.

No.	Title	Original release date
1	"Toradora SOS! 1"	February 25, 2009
When Ami Kawashima complains about having to eat tarako spaghetti, Ryūji Takasu decides to take her and Taiga Aisaka to the family diner to try some delicious tarako spaghetti and spaghetti bolognese, competing with Minori Kushieda. Yūsaku Kitamura declares the contest to be a draw. Inko says "Chopin".
2	"Toradora SOS! 2"	April 22, 2009
When Ami then complains about having to eat purin, Ryūji takes her and Taiga to the family diner again to try some delicious purin, competing with Minori again. Yūsaku declares the contest to be a draw again. Inko says "bunion".
3	"Toradora SOS! 3"	June 24, 2009
When Yuri Koigakubo feels down when her date rejected her and did not eat her curry, Ryūji takes her, Taiga and Ami to the family diner to try some delicious curry, competing with Minori yet again. Ryūji's curry is too bland, while Minori's curry is too spicy. Yūsaku declares the contest to be a draw yet again. Inko says "Toonami".
4	"Toradora SOS! 4"	August 26, 2009
Ryūji, Taiga and Minori follow Ami around the convenience store, where she buys copious amounts of corned beef. Ami gives each of them a tower of corned beef drenched in sauce. Despite how disgusting it looks, the three enjoy the meal. Yūsaku declares the contest to be a draw once again. Inko is eaten by a cat, perhaps Taiga.

== Volume DVDs ==
King Records released eight Region 2 DVD compilations, the first DVD containing four episodes and the other seven DVDs containing three episodes each, between January 21 and August 26, 2009. Volumes 2, 4, 6 and 8 feature an additional short entitled Toradora! SOS, in which chibi versions of the cast try out various foods. Limited editions of all eight compilations, each of which contains a bonus CD, were also released.

DVD releases
Volume	Released	Discs	Episodes
1	January 21, 2009	1 each	4
2	February 25, 2009	1 each	3 each
3	March 25, 2009	1 each	3 each
4	April 22, 2009	1 each	3 each
5	May 27, 2009	1 each	3 each
6	June 24, 2009	1 each	3 each
7	July 23, 2009	1 each	3 each
8	August 26, 2009	1 each	3 each
