= Cally Palace =

18th-century country house in Scotland

Coordinates: 54.86967°N 4.18309°W

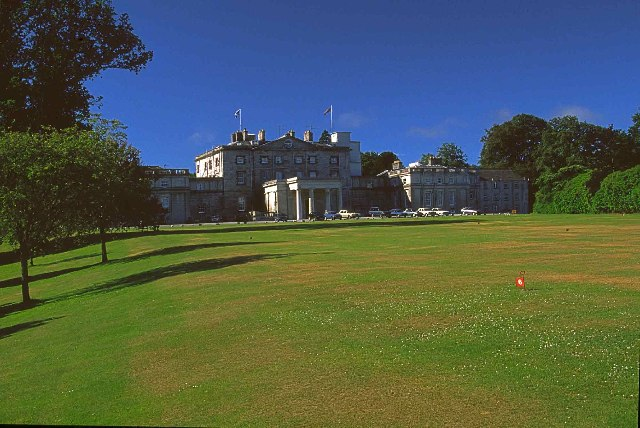
- Interactive map of the Cally Palace area

General information
- Location: Gatehouse of Fleet, Dumfries & Galloway
- Completed: 1763
- Opened: 1934
- Owner: McMillan Hotels

Design and construction
- Architect: Robert Mylne
- Developer: James Murray of Broughton

Other information
- Number of rooms: 56

Website
- callypalace.co.uk

Designations

Inventory of Gardens and Designed Landscapes in Scotland
- Official name: Cally
- Designated: 30 June 1987
- Reference no.: GDL00079

Cally Palace, formerly known as Cally House, is an 18th-century country house in the historical county of Kirkcudbrightshire in Dumfries and Galloway, south-west Scotland. The house is now a four star country house hotel and golf resort. It is located 1.2 kilometres (0.75 mi) south of Gatehouse of Fleet.

== History ==
Cally House was commissioned by James Murray of Broughton, a grandson of the 5th Earl of Galloway and of the 9th Earl of Eglinton. Murray inherited the land on the death, in 1751, of his father, who had consulted William Adam about a new house at Cally in the 1740s, although nothing had then been done. While travelling in Rome in the mid-1750s, James Murray met the young architect Robert Mylne, who prepared the first plans while still abroad. The building was complete by 1763, and over 1,000 acres (400 ha) of grounds were laid out with orchards and pleasure gardens, as well as hothouses and deer parks.

Murray later served as MP for the constituency of Wigtownshire from 1762 to 1768, as well as serving as Receiver General for Scotland in 1783. His grandson, Alexander Murray, made alterations to the house, including the portico by John Buonarotti Papworth. Further alterations were made in the 1850s, and the grounds were landscaped by William Dewar. In the later 19th century and early 20th century, the house was let out, and the last tenant was the Maharaja of Jind who lived there between 1930 and 1932.

Elizabeth Murray Usher, who inherited Cally in 1924, sold the house and grounds to the Forestry Commission in 1933. The house and 100 acres (40 ha) was sold on and converted into a hotel, which opened in 1934. It was used as a residential school for evacuees from Glasgow during the Second World War, reopening in the later 1940s. The hotel has been owned by Trust House Forte and North West Hotels Ltd, and it was part of the McMillan Hotels group until they sold this asset along with their 2 other hotels in the region and it subsequently became part of BeSpoke Hotels. The Forestry Commission planted around 525 acres (212 ha) of the estate.

== The house and grounds ==
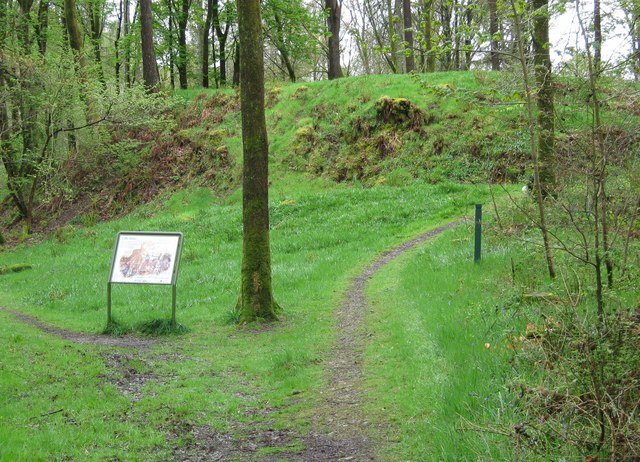
Cally Motte, the remains of the 12th-century castle

The house is of significant architectural value, and is protected as a category A listed building. The grounds are included in the Inventory of Gardens and Designed Landscapes in Scotland, the national listing of significant gardens. The estate is also within the Gatehouse of Fleet conservation area and the Fleet Valley National Scenic Area. The remains of a 12th-century motte are located in the grounds.
