= LARC =

LARC can refer to any of several things:

- The NASA Langley Research Center in Hampton, Virginia, USA.
- The London Action Resource Centre, a social centre in London
- Liver and activation-regulated chemokine, a small cytokine belonging to the CC chemokine family that is now officially called Chemokine (C-C motif) ligand 20 (CCL20),
- UNIVAC LARC, computer
- LARC-V an amphibious resupply vehicle.
- LARC-XV an amphibious resupply vehicle.
- LARC-LX an amphibious resupply vehicle (which could also transport the smaller LARCs).
- Kamen Rider Larc, a character from Kamen Rider Blade.
- Long Acting Reversible Contraception, a contraceptive device that lasts longer than typical birth controls.
- List Authorised Racket Coverings, in table tennis, a comprehensive list of rubber racket coverings authorised by the ITTF
- Licensed Asbestos Removal Contractor
