= An Awhesyth =

Traditional Cornish folk song

An Awhesyth, Cornish (Kernewek) for "The Lark", is a traditional Cornish folk song. In English, a version of this song exists called "The Lark in the Morning", and a similar song in English goes under the title "The Pretty Ploughboy" (Roud 151).

The song was collected by Rev. Sabine Baring-Gould, and appeared in his collection of Songs of the West. The song was collected from an 81-year-old pub owner.

The English versions date back to the late eighteenth century. One was collected in Essex by Ralph Vaughan Williams, and Frank Wilson collected another version of the song from Yorkshire.

There are several different tunes associated with these lyrics.

== Cornish lyrics ==
An Awhesyth

Del en-vy ow kerdhes un myttyn yn mys me,
Y clewys moren yowynk, neb geryow yn-meth hy:
"A bup galwas yn bys kekemmys may vo,
A'n araderor nyns yu par yn mys me ytho."

An awhesyth a dhyfun a'y nythva y'n myttyn,
Y bron gans gluthennow war ayr gwyn del yskyn;
An awhesyth ha'n mow aradar kescana ‘yllons y,
Dh'y nythva yn gorthewer mos wardhelergh a-wra hy.

Yth yskynnys un myttyn mar ughel, ogh mar ughel,
Y vyrys orth an le adro hag orth an ebren tewl;
Yth esa hy ow cana yn myttyn oll adro,
Nyns yu bewnans avel araderor un mys me ytho

Pan yu dewedhys oll whel a'n jeth yma dhodho,
Dhe fer po encledhyns martesen yth ello;
Y'n keth le y whra cana hag ena y whyban,
Wosa henna dh'y gares whek a dhre ef ryban.

Sowyn dhe maw aradar pypynak may vons'y
War'n glyn, neb mowes whek kemeres a whrons-y;
Whybana a wrons ha cana, owth eva coref gell,
Muy lowen yu'n tus ma es myghtern po'n gos ughel.

== English lyrics ==
The English lyrics run for many verses; they begin:

The lark in the morning she rises off her nest
She goes home in the evening with the dew all on her breast
And like the jolly ploughboy she whistles and she sings
She goes home in the evening with the dew all on her wings.

Oh, Roger the ploughboy he is a dashing blade
He goes whistling and singing over yonder leafy shade
He met with pretty Susan, she's handsome I declare
She is far more enticing than the birds all in the air.
