= Skylark (radio station) =

Dartmoor; United Kingdom
- Frequency: 105.8 MHz (Princetown); 107.6 MHz (Buckfastleigh)
- RDS: SKYLARK_

Programming
- Format: Radio art, field recordings, poetry

Ownership
- Owner: Skylark Sounds

History
- First air date: October 21, 2020

Links
- Website: skylark.fm

Skylark is a community radio station in the Dartmoor National Park, in Devon, United Kingdom. It was founded in 2020 by the operators of another community radio station, Soundart Radio in nearby Dartington following a successful crowdfunding scheme.

== Programming ==
The station broadcasts no conventional programming, such as popular music, news reports or advertising. Skylark instead broadcasts an algorithmically generated mix of field and nature recordings, oral history, poetry and music all recorded within the national park to form a local radio art installation and soundscape.

Residents of Dartmoor as well as workers and visitors in the national park are invited to play an active role in the production of the radio broadcast by contributing recorded audio material, and the station allows anyone to upload content for inclusion in its programming.

== Transmission ==
Skylark broadcasts via two FM transmitters, one located at Princetown close to the larger North Hessary Tor transmitting station; and a second transmitter at the village of Holne, near to Buckfastleigh. The station intentionally does not publicise a webcast, preferring to be heard in situ on its FM radio signal within Dartmoor, and being "only available to people living or visiting the moor".

In June 2022, Skylark suffered a transmitter breakdown lasting three weeks, but was later cleared of any licence breach by broadcasting regulator Ofcom.
