= HMS Larkspur =

Two ships of the Royal Navy have been named HMS Larkspur:

- HMS Larkspur (1915) was an Acacia-class sloop launched in 1915 and sold in 1922
- HMS Larkspur (K82) was a Flower-class corvette, launched in 1940, served as USS Fury 1942–45, sold in 1946
