= USS Lark =

USS Lark may refer to:

- USS Lark (AM-21), a Lapwing-class minesweeper laid down 11 March 1918 by Baltimore Dry Dock & Shipbuilding Co., Baltimore, Maryland
- USS Lark (AMS-23), a YMS-1-class minesweeper laid down 5 January 1943 as YMS-376 by Greenport Basin and Construction Co., Greenport, Long Island, New York
