= Skylark Holdings =

Restaurant holdings company

Skylark Holdings Co. Ltd.

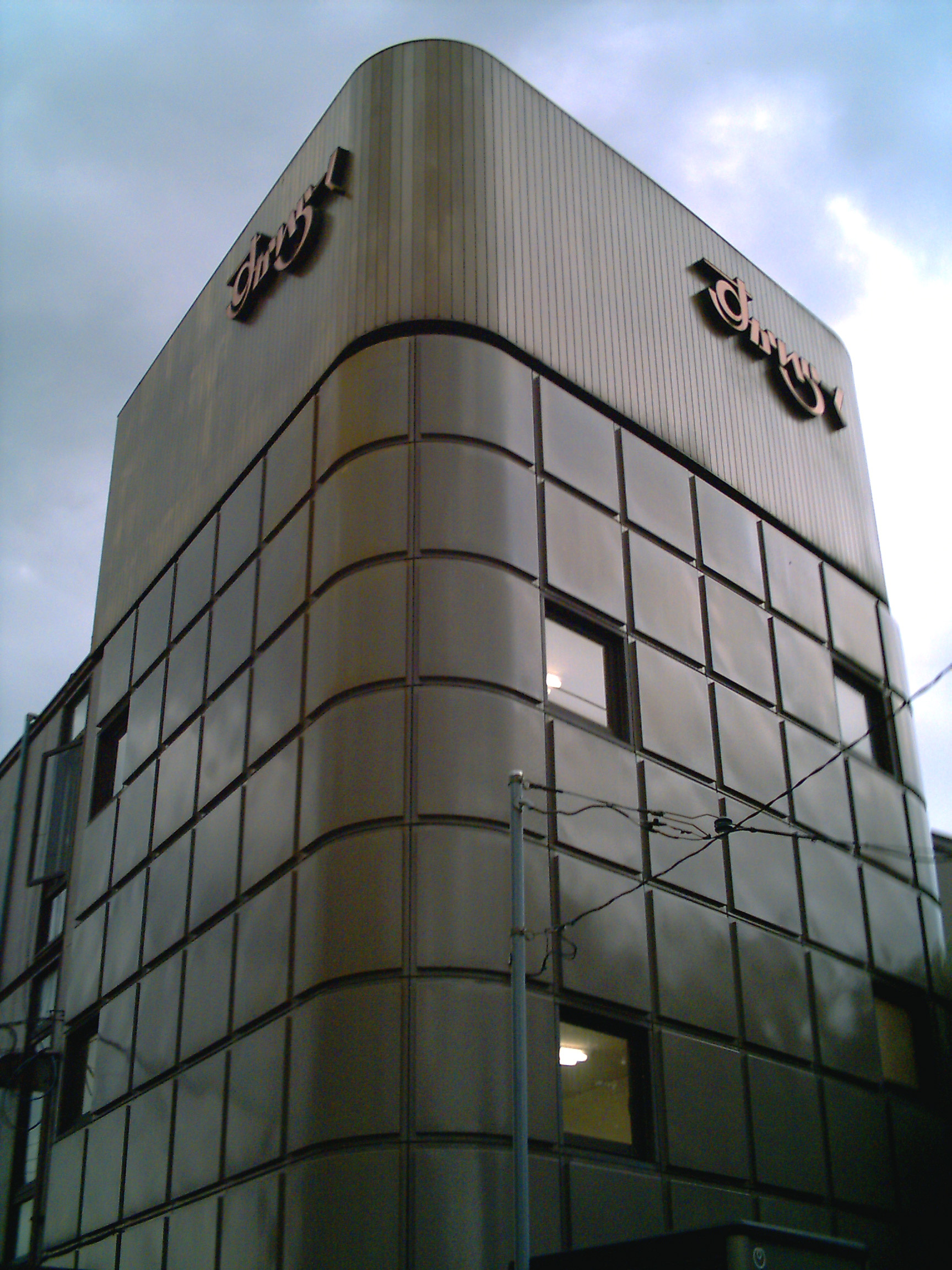
- Skylark Holdings Headquarters
- Native name: 株式会社すかいらーくホールディングス
- Romanized name: Kabushiki gaisha Sukairāku Hōrudingusu
- Type: Public KK
- Traded as: TYO: 31970
- Industry: Restaurant chains
- Predecessor: Kotobuki Foods Ltd.
- Founded: April 1962; 64 years ago
- Founders: Skylark Holdings
- Headquarters: Nishikubo, Musashino, Tokyo, Japan
- Number of locations: Japan, Taiwan, Malaysia, United States
- Revenue: 303,705(yen in millions)
- Operating income: 206,910 (yen in millions)
- Owners: Skylark Holdings
- Number of employees: 89,356
- Website: corp.skylark.co.jp/en/

Skylark Holdings (株式会社すかいらーくホールディングス, Kabushiki gaisha Sukairāku Hōrudingusu) is a Japanese corporation that owns over 2,717 restaurants in Japan, Taiwan, Malaysia and the United States. Their headquarters are in Tokyo, Japan.

== History ==
The company began in April 1962, when they opened their first company, Kotobuki Foods Ltd. They went from a private limited company to a joint-stock company in July 1969 and changed their name to Kotobuki Foods Co Ltd. They opened their first restaurant named "Skylark" in July 1970. They changed their name from Kotobouki Foods Co. Ltd to Skylark Co. Ltd in November 1974.

Skylark Co. opened up another restaurant called, "Tomato and Onion" and in August 1979 and later opened up Jonathan's in April 1980. They opened up a company in Taiwan in January 1982 and began being listed in the Tokyo Stock Exchange in August 1982. They opened their first "Bamiyan" restaurant location in April 1986, opened up their first "Gusto" restaurant location in March 1992 and opened up their first "Yumean" restaurant location in January 1994. They began testing food delivery in June 1998. They opened up their first "Jyu-Jyu Karubi" restaurant location in December 1998 then opened up their first "Totoyamichi" restaurant location in June 1999.

The company opened their first "S Gusto" restaurant in January 2001 and then opened their first "Grazie Gardens" restaurant in March 2001. In December 2001, they reached a milestone by having "Gusto" restaurants opened in all 47 Prefectures of Japan, covering the whole country. In November 2003, they then opened their 1,000th "Gusto" location in Tokyo. Their company was subject to a takeover in June 2006 and they delisted from the Tokyo Stock Exchange in September 2006.

The company opened their first "Syabu-Yo" restaurant location in May 2007 and opened their first "Steak Gusto" restaurant location in March 2010. They re-listed on the Tokyo Stock Exchange in 2014. 2015 was a year of expansion for the company as they opened restaurant locations for "Musashino Mori Coffee" in March 2015, "Miwami" and "chawan" in April 2015. They opened their first Taiwan "Syabu-Yo" location in May 2015 then their first "Yumean Shokudo" restaurant location in September 2015. They then opened their first locations for "Tonkaratei", "Katsukyu", "La Ohana" and "Karayoshi" from 2016 to 2017. Their restaurants became non-smoking in September 2019. The company notably was one of more than 7,600 outlets to close or shorten hours on New Year's Eve in 2019. The company finished off 2019 with a 3.4% stock market drop.

The company started offering digital menus in March 2020 and stopped offering 24 hour service at all stores in July 2020, but later re-opened some restaurants for 24 hour service. The company closed 200 restaurants during the COVID-19 pandemic

They opened their first "Shabu-Yo" restaurant location in Malaysia in August 2020 and opened their first "Shabu-You" restaurant location in the US in September 2021. The company then began installing floor service robots in over 1,000 "Gusto" and "Syabu-Yo" locations in October 2021. The company raised prices in October 2022 due to inflation. The company announced that they would be closing 100 restaurant locations in 2023 due to 2022 losses

In February 2023, the company said they were aiming for 170 restaurant locations outside of Japan. Also in February 2023, the company had to stop selling some egg related items due to the bird flu. The company opened a new restaurant chain called, "Tohsai" in February 2023 They made Minoru Kanaya a director in February 2023, which was the first major personnel change in 15 years.

In March 2023, the company opened its 10th Musashino Mori Coffee restaurant location in Saitama Prefecture.

== Number of locations ==
Restaurant	Restaurant count
Gusto	1,317
Bamiyan	355
Syabu-Yo	276
Jonathan's	206
Yumean	173
Steak Gusto	99
Karayoshi	86
Musashino Mori Coffee	65
Aiya	41
Grazie Gardens	25
Totoyamichi	24
chawan	21
La Ohana	17
Tonkaratei	9
Others	3
Total	2,717
