= Alouette =

Alouette or alouettes may refer to:

== Music and literature ==
- "Alouette" (song), a French-language children's song
- Alouette, a character in The King of Braves GaoGaiGar

== Aerospace ==
- SNCASE Alouette, a utility helicopter developed in France in the early 1950s which was abandoned for development of the Alouette II
- Aérospatiale Alouette, a family of light helicopters manufactured by SNCASE
- Aérospatiale Alouette II, a light utility helicopter built in France (1956–1975)
- Aérospatiale Alouette III, a light utility helicopter built in France (1961–1985)
- No. 425 Squadron RCAF, also known as Alouette Squadron and now called 425 Tactical Fighter Squadron, a squadron of CF-18 based out of Bagotville, Quebec
- Alouette 1, a Canadian satellite launched in 1962
- Alouette 2, a Canadian satellite launched in 1965

== Sport ==
- Montreal Alouettes, a team in the Canadian Football League
- Canadian Alouettes FC, a soccer team based in Montreal
- Notre-Dame-de-Grace Maple Leafs, also called the Montreal Junior Alouettes, a team in the Quebec Junior Football League
- Nipissing Alouettes, an ice hockey team
- Saint-Jérôme Alouettes, an ice hockey team

== Places ==
- Alouette Lake, a lake in British Columbia, Canada
- Alouette River, a river in British Columbia, Canada
- 9995 Alouette, an S-type main-belt asteroid

== Other uses ==
- Alouette (train), a former passenger train between Boston, US and Montreal, Canada
- Alouette (cheese), an American French-style cheese
- Aluminerie Alouette, an aluminum smelter located at Sept-Îles, Quebec
- Legio V Alaudae, or the Fifth Larks Legion, a legion levied by Julius Caesar in 52 BC

== See also ==
- Lark (French: Alouette), a bird
- "Promise This" (2010), a song by Cheryl
