= Hired armed lugger Lark =

His Majesty's hired armed lugger Lark served the Royal Navy from 3 January 1799 to 6 November 1801. She was armed with two 4-pounder guns and twelve 12-pounder carronades. She had a burthen of 17013/94 tons (bm), and a crew of 50 men and boys. At the end of her contract, the Admiralty returned her to her owners.

== Service ==
On 21 April 1800, Lieutenant Thomas Henry Wilson assumed command of Lark, for the North Sea. Immediately before taking command of Lark, Wilson had commanded Venom in the Caribbean.

On 21 April, Lark engaged with an unknown French cutter that she drove on shore, but was not, however, able to destroy. A neutral vessel that came out on 23 April informed Wilson that the cutter carried 10 guns and 36 men, and that after she got off the shore she had sailed to the Texel roads along the inside of the barrier islands.

Then on 25 April, Lark captured the French privateer cutter Impregnable. Lark ran the Impregnable on shore on Vlie Island where Impregnable's crew got ashore under the protection of about 100 troops who had gathered there. Wilson then sent his small boat to get Impregnable off. Lark's sailors came under musket fire from the troops on shore so Wilson sent his large boat, which cleared away the soldiers. Impregnable turned out to have been armed with twelve 3-pounder guns and two 9-pounder guns, and to have had a crew of 60.

Circa 12 March 1801, the British fleet under Admiral Sir Hyde Parker sailed from Yarmouth roads for Copenhagen, with Lark among the "gun-brigs, cutters, etc." On 30 March, Vice-admiral Lord Nelson, and Rear-admiral Graves, accompanied by Captain Domett and the commanding officer of the troops, sailed in Lark to reconnoiter the Danish defenses at Copenhagen. The Battle of Copenhagen then took place on 2 April; on 12 April the fleet sailed into the Baltic.

In May Nelson sent Lark to Latona to await the arrival of Lord St Helens from his mission to arrange a peace treaty with Russia.

== Postscript ==
On 22 July 1802, the head money for those present at the "Engagement at Copenhagen" was due for payment. In 1847, the Admiralty authorized the issue of the Naval General Service Medal with clasp "Copenhagen 1801" to all still surviving participants in the battle.

== Citations and references ==
Citations

References

- James, William (1837). The Naval History of Great Britain, from the Declaration of War by France in 1793, to the Accession of George IV. Vol. 3. R. Bentley.
- Marshall, John (1833). "Wilson, Thomas Henry" . Royal Naval Biography. Vol. 4, part 1. London: Longman and Company. p. 217-218.
- Winfield, Rif (2008). British Warships in the Age of Sail 1793–1817: Design, Construction, Careers and Fates. Seaforth. ISBN 1-86176-246-1.
