= Yuto Nakajima =

Japanese singer, actor and model (born 1993)

- 中島 裕翔
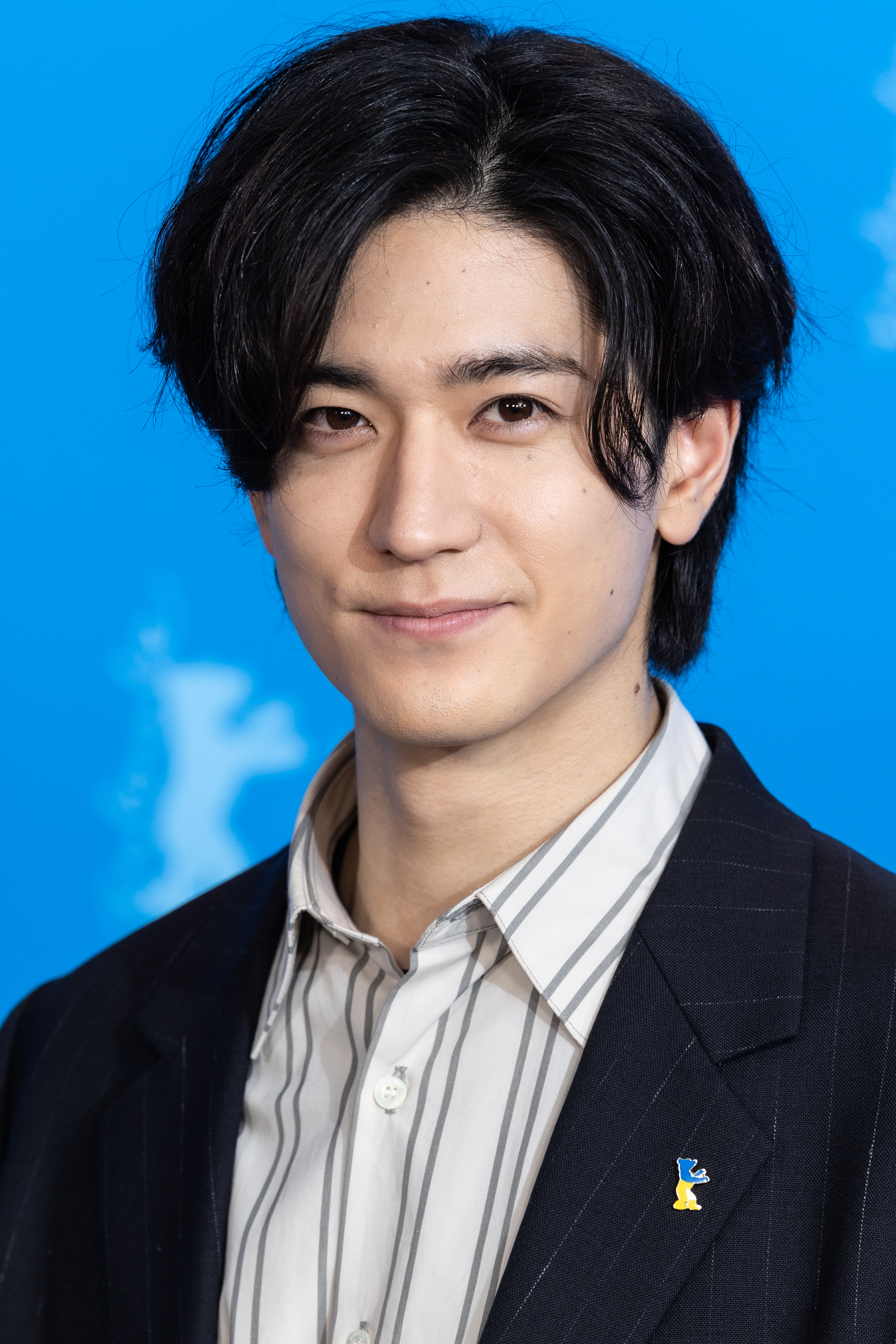
- Nakajima at the 2023 Berlin International Film Festival
- Born: August 10, 1993 (age 33); Tokyo, Japan
- Education: Horikoshi High School
- Occupations: Singer; actor; model
- Years active: 2004–present
- Height: 1.8 m (5 ft 11 in)
- Spouse: Yuko Araki (m. 2026)
- Musical career
- Genres: J-pop; R&B; electropop; dance-pop; electronic; hip hop; dance; electronic dance
- Instruments: Vocals; drums
- Labels: Starto Entertainment; Storm Labels

Japanese name
- Kanji: 中島 裕翔
- Hiragana: なかじま ゆうと
Transcriptions
- Romanization: Nakajima Yuto

Yuto Nakajima (Japanese: 中島 裕翔, Hepburn: Nakajima, Yūto) is a Japanese singer, actor and model associated with Starto Entertainment. He is a former member of Hey! Say! JUMP. He played Koji Kiritani in the 2005 Japanese television drama, Nobuta wo Produce.

== Career ==
=== 2004: Becoming an artist for Johnny's Entertainment ===
Nakajima joined Johnny's Jr. on March 28, 2004, in his 5th year of elementary school. After joining Johnny's Jr., he began performing together with J.J.Express as one of the five original members along with Kouhei Matsumoto, Takumi Yamashita, Yuta Tamamori, and current Hey! Say! JUMP member, Kei Inoo.

=== 2005–2007: Initial acting experience and first Hey! Say! JUMP appearance ===
In 2005, he made his debut as an actor and had appeared in a couple of dramas including the drama special for 24 Hour Television, and Nobuta wo Produce with two of his agency seniors, Kazuya Kamenashi, and Tomohisa Yamashita. He also appeared in Engine along with current groupmate, Daiki Arioka. He continued his junior work and was cast in the drama Primadam in 2006, and towards the end of the year, he was chosen to be part of Tap Kids, a Johnny's Jr. group, along with Noriyuki Kanda.

In April 2007, he was chosen to be a member of the temporary group, Hey! Say! 7 with four others, and made his CD debut on August 1, with their single "Hey! Say!", which hit number one on the Oricon charts. On September 24 of that same year, during a live television event from the Johnny's Jr's concert in Yokohama Arena, it was announced that the group would debut under a new name, Hey! Say! JUMP, with the five from Hey! Say! 7, plus five others. The debut single was released on November 14, titled "Ultra Music Power", and also took first place on the Oricon charts.

=== 2008–2011: Leading role at drama Sensei Wa Erai and debut group album JUMP No. 1 ===
On April 12, 2008, Nakajima got his first lead role on the drama Sensei Wa Erai along with his co Hey! Say! JUMP member Daiki Arioka, Ryosuke Yamada, Yuri Chinen.

On October 11, 2008, Nakajima played another lead role in the drama called Scrap Teacher. The theme song used in the drama was Hey! Say! JUMP's fourth single "Mayonaka no Shadow Boy". Daiki Arioka, Ryosuke Yamada, Yuri Chinen also co-star in the drama.

During their press conference at Yokohama Arena, current groupmate, Kota Yabu announced that Hey! Say! JUMP would release their debut album in the summer, in which members would write songs and lyrics. One of them was Nakajima who wrote the lyrics of "Dash!!", which was track number 15 on the album JUMP No.1.

=== 2012–2024: Rise to popularity and prominence ===
Nakajima appeared as Koji Kobayashi in NTV's comedy drama Perfect Son with his groupmate Ryosuke Yamada, which started on January 14, 2012. On February 17, it was reported that Nakajima together with Yamada and Chinen had officially graduated from Horikoshi High School.

On July 10, 2012, his appearance on the August issue of Fine Boys Magazine also marked his entrance in the professional world of modelling. Later that year, too, it was announced that he would participate in Hey! Say! JUMP's upcoming April 2013 – April 2014 annual calendar as a photographer.

In January 2013, he co-starred in the TV drama Sharehouse no Koibito alongside Mizukawa Asami and Oizumi Yo. He then played another supporting role in the summer TV drama Hanzawa Naoki starring Masato Sakai, which started on July 7, 2013. He also had a small role in Tokyo Bandwagon that fall.

In the spring of 2014, Nakajima was announced as part of the big-cast drama series Yowakutemo Katemasu starring his agency's senior and Arashi member Ninomiya Kazunari. That summer became another big break for Nakajima as he got his first starring drama role in Suikyu Yankees. Yuya Takaki also co-stars in the drama.

Nakajima started 2015 with a hit romantic comedy drama Date starring Watanabe Anne and Hasegawa Hiroki. That same month, it was announced that he will star his very first movie, Pink to Gray, a novel adaptation written by his agency's senior and NEWS member Shigeaki Kato. The movie was directed by renowned director Yukisada Isao.

On October 1, 2015, Nakajima, along with co-star Suda Masaki and director Yukisada, flew to Korea for the world premiere of the said movie in Busan International Film Festival.

Nakajima again appeared in the TV special of his earlier drama Date.

In 2022, he became the lead for the situational thriller movie #Manhole, directed by Kazuyoshi Kumakiri to be released in February 2023. It was his first movie since Our Meal for Tomorrow in 2017. In December the same year, it was announced that the movie had been invited to the Berlinale Special section at the 73rd Berlin International Film Festival, one of the world's three major film festivals. It became the first Japanese feature film since 2016 to be invited for screening in the Berlinale Special section of the festival. Both Nakajima and director Kumakiri attended the festival and appeared on the red carpet. The movie and Nakajima's portrayal received generally positive reviews, with a current rating of 95% on Rotten Tomatoes.

=== 2025–present ===
He is set to appear in a movie and a drama in January 2025. The movie 366 Days is an original movie inspired by a song of the same title by Japanese rock band HY (also contributing to the soundtrack). Nakajima is set to play the supporting role Ryusei Kayoda and the role requires him to speak in Okinawan accent.

He is also set to appear as the co-lead in the KTV/Fuji Television live-action drama adaptation of the manga of the same name The Top Secret, playing two roles: Aoki Ikko and Suzuki Katsuhiro. This is the second live-action adaptation of the manga and the first in a drama format.

On August 28, 2025, Yuto Nakajima announced his graduation from the group to seek an acting career. According to the Starto Entertainment post, he is to open a personal fan club in October, date pending.

== Personal life ==
On April 11, 2026, Nakajima and actress Yuko Araki jointly announced that they had officially registered their marriage.

== Discography ==
=== Solo songs ===
- "D.N.A"
- "Ai wa Hitotsu"
- "Uruwashi no Bad Girl"
- "Waiting for the Rain"

== Group participations ==
- J.J. Express (August 2005 – 2007)
- Small but Big (January 2006)
- Tap Kids (August 2006)
- J.J.Express ちびっこチーム (January – September 2007)
- Hey! Say! 7 (Temporary) (April 3 – September 30, 2007)
- Hey! Say! JUMP (September 24, 2007–present)
- Hey! Say! 7 (September 2007–present)

=== Concerts ===
For Hey! Say! JUMP-related concerts, see Hey! Say! JUMP.

== Filmography ==
=== Films ===
Year	Title	Role	Notes	Ref.
2016	Pink and Gray	Shiraki Rengo	Lead role	
2017	Our Meal for Tomorrow	Hayama Ryota	Lead role	
2023	#Manhole	Shunsuke Kawamura	Lead role	
2025	366 Days	Ryusei Kayoda		

=== Dramas ===
Year	Title	Role	Note	Ref.
2005	Nobuta wo Produce	Koji Kiritani		
2005	The Little Engineer's Dream SP	Tomohisa Nishida		
2006	Primadam	Haruo Kurahashi		
2006	Scrap Teacher	Shusaburo Kusaka		
2008	Sensei wa Erai!	Sota Matsuki	Lead role; television film	
2012	Perfect Son	Koji Kobayashi		
2013	Share House no Koibito	Nagi Tsuyama		
2013	Hanzawa Naoki	Eiji Nakanishi		
2013	Tokyo Bandwagon	Matsutani Yuta		
2014	Yowakutemo Katemasu	Tsuyoshi Shirao		
2014	Suikyuu Yankees - Water Polo Yankees	Naoya Inaba	Lead Role	
2015	Dating: What's it Like to Be in Love	Yutaka Washio		
2016	Nobunaga Moyu	Mori Ranmaru	Television film	
2016	Keiji Ballerino	Usushima Kurumi	Lead Role; television film	
2016	Hope; Kitai Zero no Shinnyu Shain	Ayumu Chinose	Lead role	
2017	Haha ni Naru	Shuhei Kino		
2018–2020	Suits	Daiki Suzuki	2 seasons	
2019	Boku wa Doko Kara	Kaoru Takeuchi	Lead role	
2022	Love Dissonance	Masaki Nitta	Lead role	
2025	Himitsu – Top Secret	Ikkō Aoki, Katsuhiro Suzuki	Lead roles	

=== Variety shows ===
Year	Title	Notes	Ref.
2004–2014	The Shonen Club		

== Theatre ==
Year	Title	Venue
2005	Endless Shock	-
2006	DREAM BOYS	Imperial Theatre
2006	Takizawa Enbujo	Shimbashi Theater
2006	One!-The history of Tackey-	Nissay Theatre
2007	Takizawa Enbujo 2007	Shimbashi Theater
