= Lark Hotels =

United States hôtel management and development company

- Company type: Private
- Industry: Hospitality industry
- Founded: 2012
- Founder: Rob Blood
- Headquarters: Portsmouth, New Hampshire, United States
- Key people: Peter Twachtman, Chief Executive Officer
- Services: Lodging, Hotel Management
- Number of employees: 500+
- Website: http://www.larkhotels.com/

Lark Hotels is a hotel management and development company, which owns and develops hotels on the East Coast, Texas and California. They launched in 2012, and—as of 2017—have 18 hotels with up to 96 rooms. In 2021, Lark Hotels introduced Bluebird Hotels, a sister collection of roadside lodges.

== Hotels and Management ==
CEO Rob Blood and Dawn Hagin founded the company in 2012. In March 2013, Blood announced the company had formed a partnership with the lifestyle brand company Vineyard Vines, and both companies have subsequently worked together on numerous hotels.

Hotels owned and operated by the company include the Wesley Hotel in Oak Bluffs, Massachusetts, the Captain Fairfield Inn in Maine, the Attwater in Rhode Island, and the Ale House Inn in New Hampshire.
