= NEWS discography =

Band discography

- Studio albums: 16
- Compilation albums: 1
- Singles: 26
- Concert videos: 11

Japanese boy band NEWS has released sixteen studio albums, one compilation album, twenty-six singles, and ten concert videos.

== Albums ==
=== Studio albums ===
Title	Album details	Peak positions				Sales	Certifications
Title	Album details	JPN	JPN Comb (Note: The Oricon Combined Albums Chart was established on December 24, 2018.)	TWN	TWN East Asian	Sales	Certifications
Touch	Released: April 27, 2005; Label: Johnny's Entertainment; Format: CD, CD+DVD	1	—	—	2	JPN: 250,000+	RIAJ: Platinum
Pacific	Released: November 7, 2007; Label: Johnny's Entertainment; Format: CD	1	—	3	1	JPN: 250,000+	RIAJ: Platinum
Color	Released: November 19, 2008; Label: Johnny's Entertainment; Format: CD	1	—	3	1	JPN: 250,000+	RIAJ: Platinum
Live	Released: September 15, 2010; Label: Johnny's Entertainment; Format: CD, CD+DVD	1	—	—	15	JPN: 185,000	RIAJ: Gold
NEWS	Released: July 17, 2013; Label: Johnny's Entertainment; Format: CD, CD+DVD	1	—	—	1	JPN: 121,000	RIAJ: Gold
White	Released: February 25, 2015; Label: Johnny's Entertainment; Format: CD, CD+DVD	1	—	—	1	JPN: 128,000	RIAJ: Gold
Quartetto	Released: March 9, 2016; Label: Johnny's Entertainment; Format: CD, CD+DVD	1	—	—	—	JPN: 125,000	RIAJ: Gold
Neverland	Released: March 22, 2017; Label: Johnny's Entertainment; Format: CD, CD+DVD	1	—	—	—	JPN: 142,000	RIAJ: Gold
Epcotia	Released: March 21, 2018; Label: Johnny's Entertainment; Format: CD, CD+DVD	1	—	—	—	JPN: 131,000	RIAJ: Gold
Worldista	Released: February 20, 2019; Label: Johnny's Entertainment; Format: CD, CD+DVD	1	1	—	—	JPN: 108,741	
Story	Released: March 4, 2020; Label: Johnny's Entertainment; Format: CD, CD+DVD	1	1	—	—	JPN: 115,130	
Ongaku (音楽)	Released: August 17, 2022; Label: Johnny's Entertainment; Format: CD, CD+DVD, CD+Blu-ray	1	1	—	—	JPN: 106,389	
NEWS Expo	Released: August 9, 2023; Label: Johnny's Entertainment; Format: CD, CD+DVD, CD+Blu-ray	1	1	—	—	JPN: 149,438	
JapaNEWS	Released: August 7, 2024; Label: Johnny's Entertainment; Format: CD, CD+DVD, CD+Blu-ray	1	1	—	—	JPN: 107,572	
Henshin (変身)	Released: August 6, 2025; Label: ELOV; Format: CD	1	1	—	—	JPN: 86,933	
KMK	Released: July 29, 2026; Label: ELOV; Format: CD	1	—	—	—	JPN: 112,945	RIAJ: Gold
"—" denotes a recording that did not chart or was not released in that territory.

=== Compilation albums ===
Title	Album details	Peak positions			Sales	Certifications
Title	Album details	JPN	TWN	TWN EA	Sales	Certifications
NEWS Best	Released: June 13, 2012; Label: Johnny's Entertainment; Format: CD	1	12	8	JPN: 134,000	RIAJ: Gold

== EPs ==
Title	EP details	Peak positions		Sales
Title	EP details	JPN	JPN Comb (Note: The Oricon Combined Albums Chart was established on December 24, 2018.)	Sales
Ongaku: 2nd Movement (音楽 -2nd Movement-)	Released: March 15, 2023; Label: Johnny's Entertainment; Format: CD, CD+DVD, CD+Blu-ray	1	1	JPN: 107,946

== Singles ==
Title	Year	Peak chart positions					Sales (JPN)	Certifications	Album
Title	Year	JPN	JPN Comb (Note: The Oricon Combined Singles Chart was established on December 24, 2018.)	JPN Hot.	TWN	TWN EA	Sales (JPN)	Certifications	Album
"News Nippon"	2003	—	—	—	—	—			Touch
"Kibō (Yell)"	2004	1	—	95	—	—	395,406	RIAJ: 2× Platinum	Touch
"Akaku Moyuru Taiyō"	2004	1	—	—	—	—	251,223	RIAJ: Platinum	Touch
"Cherish"	2005	1	—	—	—	—	261,980	RIAJ: Platinum	Touch
"Teppen"	2005	1	—	—	—	—	245,209	RIAJ: Platinum	Pacific
"Sayaendō"	2006	1	—	—	—	—	222,848	RIAJ: Platinum	Pacific
"Hadashi no Cinderella Boy"	2006	1	—	—	—	—	222,848	RIAJ: Platinum	Pacific
"Hoshi o Mezashite"	2007	1	—	—	—	—	311,000	RIAJ: Platinum	Pacific
"weeeek"	2007	1	—	42	—	—	334,000	RIAJ: Platinum	Color
"Taiyō no Namida"	2008	1	—	1	—	—	291,000	RIAJ: Platinum	Color
"Summer Time"	2008	1	—	1	—	1	259,000	RIAJ: Platinum	Color
"Happy Birthday"	2008	1	—	1	7	2	239,000	RIAJ: Platinum	Color
"Koi no ABO"	2009	1	—	1	5	1	285,000	RIAJ: Platinum	Live
"Sakura Girl"	2010	1	—	1	7	2	233,000	RIAJ: Platinum	Live
"Fighting Man"	2010	1	—	1	—	—	173,000	RIAJ: Gold	NEWS Best
"Chankapāna"	2012	1	—	1	—	1	305,000	RIAJ: Platinum; RIAJ: Platinum (st.)	News
"World Quest"	2012	1	—	1	—	2	148,000	RIAJ: Gold	News
"Pokopon Pekōrya"	2012	1	—	6	—	2	148,000	RIAJ: Gold	News
"One (For the Win)"	2014	1	—	2	—	—	199,000	RIAJ: Gold	White
"Kaguya"	2015	1	—	1	—	—	157,000	RIAJ: Gold	White
"Chumu Chumu"	2015	1	—	1	—	5	124,000	RIAJ: Gold	Quartetto
"Hikari no Shizuku"	2016	1	—	1	—	1	164,000	RIAJ: Gold	Quartetto
"Touch"	2016	1	—	40	—	1	164,000	RIAJ: Gold	Quartetto
"Koi o Shiranai Kimi e"	2016	1	—	1	—	—	179,000	RIAJ: Gold	Neverland
"Emma"	2017	1	—	1	—	—	165,000	RIAJ: Gold	Neverland
"LPS"	2018	1	—	1	—	—	152,000	RIAJ: Gold	Epcotia
"Blue"	2018	1	—	1	—	—	180,000	RIAJ: Gold	Worldista
"Ikiro"	2018	1	—	1	—	—	231,000	RIAJ: Platinum	Worldista
"Top Gun"	2019	1	1	1	—	—	179,715		Story
"Love Story"	2019	1	1	44	—	—	179,715		Story
"Beautiful"	2020	1	1		—	—			Ongaku
"Chincha Umakka"	2020	1	1		—	—			Ongaku
"Kanariya”	2020	1	1		—	—			Ongaku
"Burn"	2021	1	1		—	—			Ongaku
"Mirai e"	2021	1	1		—	—	132,963		Ongaku
"ReBorn"	2021	1	1		—	—	132,963		Ongaku
"Loser"	2022	1	1	4	—	—	132,021		Ongaku
"Sanjūshi" (三銃士)	2022	1	1	—	—	—	132,021		Ongaku
"Gifted" (ギフテッド)	2023	1	1	3	—	—	128,689		Non-album singles
"KMK"	2026	—	—	38	—	—			Non-album singles
"—" denotes a recording that did not chart or was not released in that territory.

=== DVD singles ===
Title	Year	Peaks		Sales (JPN)	Certifications	Album
Title	Year	JPN	JPN Hot.	Sales (JPN)	Certifications	Album
"Yon Jūshi"	2015	1	15	95,000	RIAJ: Gold	Quartetto

== Videography ==
=== Concert videos ===
Title	Video details	Peak positions			Sales	Certifications
Title	Video details	JPN DVD	JPN BD	TWN	Sales	Certifications
NEWS Nippon 0304	Released: April 7, 2004; Label: J Storm; Format: DVD, VHS	2	*	1		
Never Ending Wonderful Story	Released: August 8, 2007; Label: M.Co.; Format: DVD	1	*	1	JPN: 137,000	RIAJ: Gold
NEWS Concert Tour Pacific 2007 2008 – The First Tokyo Dome Concert	Released: August 13, 2008; Label: Johnny's Entertainment; Format: DVD	1	*	1	JPN: 183,000	RIAJ: Gold
NEWS Live Diamond	Released: November 4, 2009; Label: Johnny's Entertainment; Format: DVD	1	*	1	JPN: 163,000	RIAJ: Gold
NEWS Dome Party 2010 Live! Live! Live! DVD!	Released: December 22, 2010; Label: Johnny's Entertainment; Format: DVD	1	*	—	JPN: 154,000	RIAJ: Gold
NEWS Live Tour 2012: Utsukushii Koi o Suru yo	Released: January 30, 2013; Label: Johnny's Entertainment; Format: DVD, Blu-ray	1	7	—	JPN: 90,000	
NEWS 10th Anniversary in Tokyo Dome	Released: March 19, 2014; Label: Johnny's Entertainment; Format: DVD, Blu-ray	2	1	4	JPN: 90,000	
NEWS Live Tour 2015 White	Released: April 20, 2016; Label: Johnny's Entertainment; Format: DVD, Blu-ray	1	1	*	JPN: 111,000	RIAJ: Gold
NEWS Live Tour 2016 Quartetto	Released: December 14, 2016; Label: Johnny's Entertainment; Format: DVD, Blu-ray	1	1	*	JPN: 133,000	RIAJ: Gold
NEWS Live Tour 2017 Neverland	Released: January 24, 2018; Label: Johnny's Entertainment; Format: DVD, Blu-ray	1	1	*	JPN: 141,000	RIAJ: Gold
NEWS Arena Tour 2018 EPCOTIA	Released: January 16, 2019; Label: Johnny's Entertainment; Format: DVD, Blu-ray	1	1	*	JPN: 91,000	RIAJ: Gold
