= List of Oricon number-one singles of 2008 =

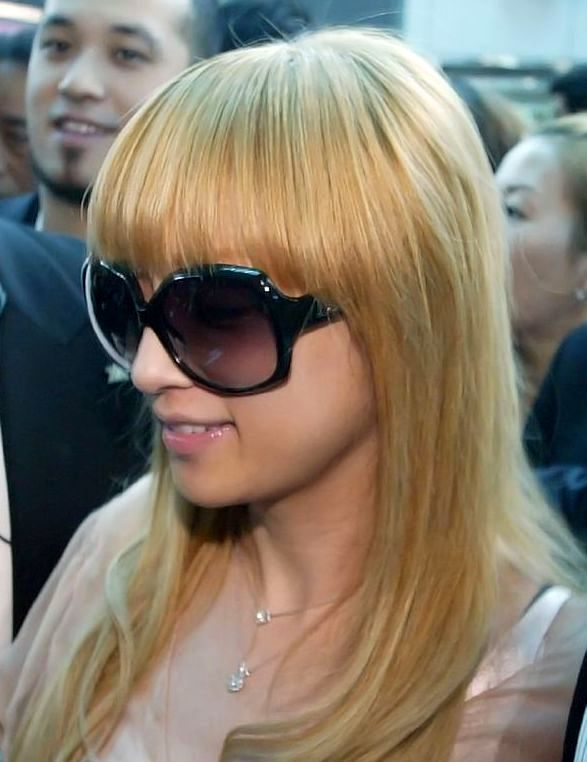
Pop singer Ayumi Hamasaki is the only female artist to have a number one single for 10 consecutive years.

The highest-selling singles in Japan are ranked in the Oricon Weekly Chart, which is published by Oricon Style magazine. The data are compiled by Oricon based on each singles' weekly physical sales. In 2008, 49 singles reached the peak of the chart.

R&B singer Namie Amuro's "60s 70s 80s" became her first number one single in nearly 10 years. The single made Amuro the only female Japanese artist to have a Top 10 single for 14 consecutive years. Pop boy band NEWS' "Happy Birthday" made them the second group after the KinKi Kids to have 10 consecutive number one singles since their debut. "Purple Line" made Korean pop boy band TVXQ the fifth non-Japanese Asian artist and the first male group to have a number one on the charts. With the release of "Jumon: Mirotic" they became the only foreign artist to have four number ones on the chart.

R&B singer Thelma Aoyama's "Soba ni Iru ne" became the fastest-selling single of 2008, selling over a million copies digitally. The single was then certified by Guinness World Records as "the best selling download single in Japan". Pop singer Ayumi Hamasaki's "Mirrorcle World" debuted atop the chart, this makes Hamasaki the only female artist to have a number one single for 10 consecutive years. Technopop girl group Perfume's "Love the World" is the first technopop single to ever rank number one on the charts. Mr. Children and Greeeen are the only two artists that had an extended run on the charts.

The best-selling single overall of 2008 was pop boy band Arashi's "Truth/Kaze no Mukō e", selling a little over 618,000 copies. Arashi's "One Love" also took the place as the second-best-selling single, which sold more than 524,000 copies, followed by pop rock band Southern All Stars' "I Am Your Singer" with 520,000 copies. The fourth- and fifth-best-selling singles of 2008 were "Kiseki" by Greeeen and "Shuchishin" (羞恥心, Shūchishin) by Shuchishin's, respectively. "Truth/Kaze no Mukō e" and "One Love" taking the Top Two spots made Arashi the fifth artist to do so. This was last achieved by Princess Princess in 1989.

== Chart history ==
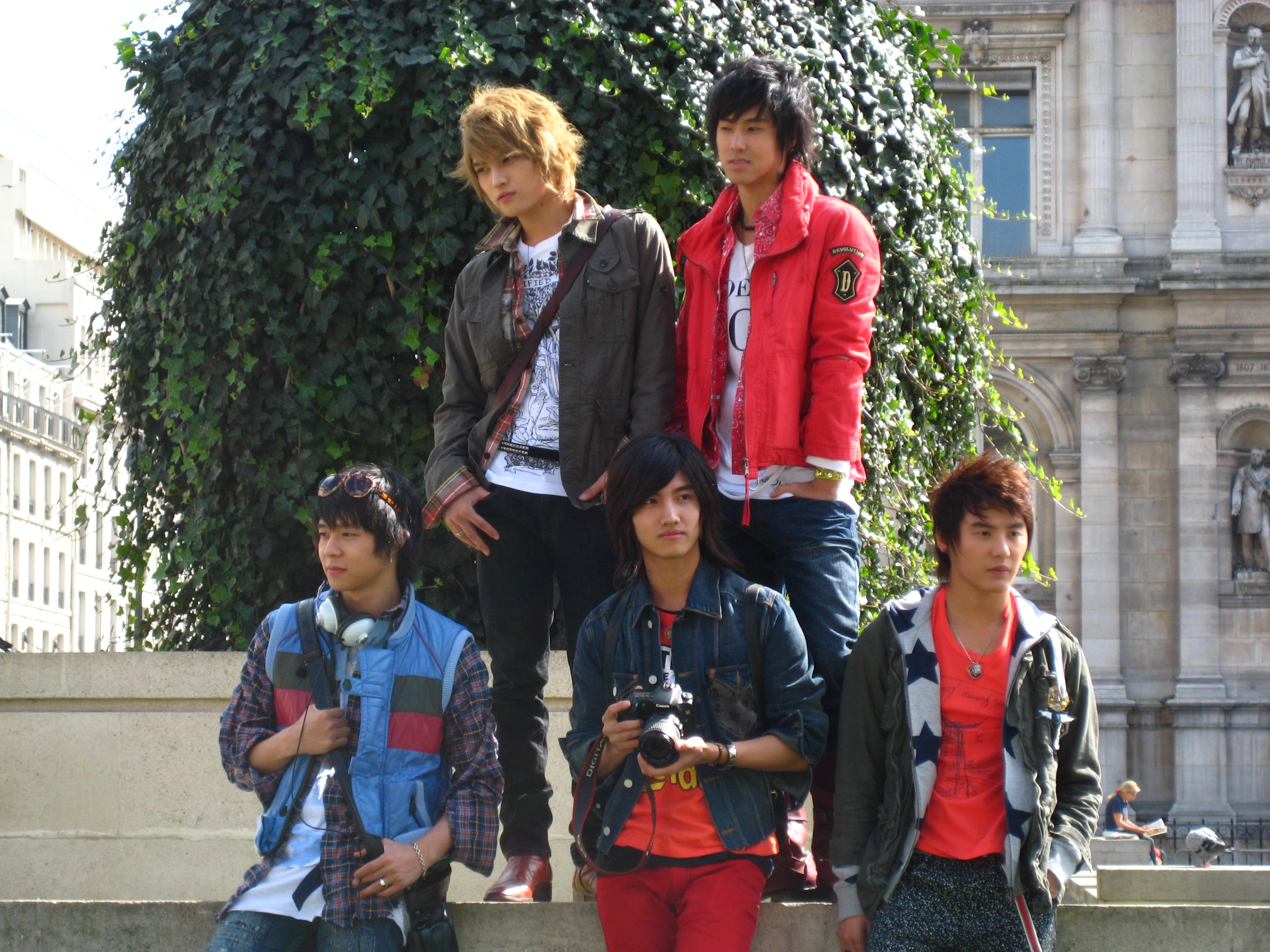
TVXQ are the first foreign artist to have four number one singles on the charts.

Issue Date	Single	Artist(s)	Reference(s)
January 14	"Dangan Fighter" (弾丸ファイター, Dangan Faitā, Bullet Fighter)	SMAP	
January 21	"Mirage"	AAA	
January 28	"Purple Line"	TVXQ	
February 4	"Order Made"	Radwimps	
February 11	"Soba ni Iru ne"	Thelma Aoyama feat. SoulJa	
February 18	"Lips"	KAT-TUN	
February 25	"Anata ga Koko ni Itara" (あなたがここにいたら, If Only You Were Here)	Porno Graffitti	
March 3	"Step and Go"	Arashi	
March 10	"Taiyō no Namida" (太陽のナミダ, The Sun's Tears)	NEWS	
March 17	"Sono Mama/White Message" (そのまま／Ｗｈｉｔｅ Ｍｅｓｓａｇｅ, Just That Way/White Message)	SMAP	
March 24	"Wahaha"	Kanjani Eight	
March 31	"60s 70s 80s"	Namie Amuro	
April 7	"Ore ja Nakya, Kimi ja Nakya" (オレじゃなきゃ、キミじゃなきゃ)	20th Century	
April 14	"Drink It Down"	L'Arc-en-Ciel	
April 21	"Mirrorcle World"	Ayumi Hamasaki	
April 28	"Burn (Fumetsu no Face)"	B'z	
May 5	"Beautiful You/Sennen Koi Uta"	TVXQ	
May 12	"No More"	Tsukasa Maizu	
May 19	"Summer Time"	NEWS	
May 26	"Don't U Ever Stop"	KAT-TUN	
June 2	"Dreams Come True"	Hey! Say! JUMP	
June 9	"Kiseki"	Greeeen	
June 16	"Kiseki"	Greeeen	
June 23	"Verb"	Glay	
June 30	"Ai Ai Gasa"	Tegomass	
July 7	"One Love"	Arashi	
July 14	"Summer Song"	Yui	
July 21	"Love the World"	Perfume	
July 28	"Dōshite Kimi o Suki ni Natte Shimattandarō?	TVXQ	
August 4	"Your Seed/Bōken Rider"	Hey! Say! JUMP	
August 11	"Gift"	Mr. Children	
August 18	"I Am Your Singer"	Southern All Stars	
August 25	"Kono Toki, Kitto Yume Ja Nai" (この瞬間、きっと夢じゃない, This Moment, I Know It's Not a Dream)	SMAP	
September 1	"Truth/Kaze no Mukō e"	Arashi	
September 8	"Secret Code"	KinKi Kids	
September 15	"Hanabi"	Mr. Children	
September 22	"Hanabi"	Mr. Children	
September 29	"Light In My Heart/Swing!"	V6	
October 6	"The Birthday: Ti Amo"	Exile	
October 13	"Happy Birthday	NEWS	
October 20	"Taboo"	Kumi Koda	
October 27	"Jumon (Mirotic)"	TVXQ	
November 3	"Mayonaka no Shadow Boy"	Hey! Say! JUMP	
November 10	"Musekinin Hero"	Kanjani Eight	
November 17	"Beautiful Days"	Arashi	
November 24	"Tsuretette Tsuretette" (連れてって 連れてって, Take Me Take Me)	Dreams Come True	
December 1	"Hakanaku mo Towa no Kanashi"	Uverworld	
December 8	"Last Christmas"	Exile	
December 15	"White X'mas"	KAT-TUN	
December 22	"Yowamushi Santa" (弱虫サンタ, Cowardly Santa)	Shuchishin	
December 29	"Days/Green	Ayumi Hamasaki	
