= Pacific (NEWS album) =

Studio album by NEWS
- Released: November 7, 2007
- Genre: Pop
- Length: 57:16
- Label: Johnny & Associates

NEWS chronology
Touch (2005)	Pacific (2007)	Color (2008)

Singles from Pacific
- 1. "Teppen" Released: July 13, 2005; 2. "Sayaendō/Hadashi no Cinderella Boy" Released: March 15, 2006; 3. "Hoshi o Mezashite" Released: March 21, 2007

Pacific is the second studio album by Japanese musical group NEWS, released on November 7, 2007. The album reached the number one position on the Oricon Daily Album Chart and Oricon Weekly Album Chart. Four singles have been released from this album. The limited edition includes a 74-page photobook, while the regular edition comes with an 18-page booklet and 2 bonus tracks. It was released simultaneously with the single "Weeeek."

== Tie-ups and theme songs ==
"Teppen" was used as the theme song to Fuji TV's coverage of the Women's Volleyball World Grand Prix 2005.

== Track listing ==
CD
No.	Title	Length
1.	"Ai no Matador" (愛のマタドール)
2.	"Sayaendō" (サヤエンドウ "Peas")
3.	"Teppen"
4.	"Change the World"
5.	"Kimi Omou Yoru" (君思う夜)
6.	"Alibi" (アリバイ (Shigeaki Kato, Keiichiro Koyama duet))
7.	"Code" (Ryo Nishikido solo)
8.	"Chirarizumu" (チラリズム (Kato, Koyama duet))
9.	"Ai Nante" (愛なんて (Nishikido, Kato, Yuya Tegoshi trio))
10.	"Nantoka Narusa" (なんとかなるさ (Tomohisa Yamashita, Takahisa Masuda, Koyama trio))
11.	"Gomen Ne Juliet" (ゴメンネ ジュリエット (Yamashita solo))
12.	"Hadashi no Cinderella Boy" (裸足のシンデレラボーイ "Barefoot Cinderella Boy")
13.	"Hoshi o Mezashite" (星をめざして "Aim for the Stars")
14.	"Mafuyu no Nagareboshi" (真冬のナガレボシ)
15.	"Sono Egao Boku ni Misete" (その笑顔 僕に見せて)

Notes

- All of Hiroki Uchi and Hironori Kusano's lines in "TEPPEN" were re-recorded by other members of the group for the version on this album.

== Charts and certifications ==
=== Charts ===
Chart (2007)	Peak position
Japan Oricon Weekly Album Chart	1

=== Sales and certifications ===
Country	Provider	Sales	Certification
Japan	RIAJ	198,000	Platinum
