= EPCOTIA =

Studio album by NEWS
- Released: March 21, 2018
- Genre: J-pop
- Language: Japanese
- Label: ELOV-Label

NEWS chronology
Neverland (2016)	EPCOTIA (2018)	Worldista (2019)

Singles from EPCOTIA
- 1. "LPS" Released: January 17, 2018

EPCOTIA is the ninth album by Japanese boy band NEWS, released on March 21, 2018. The album debuted at the top of Oricon chart, selling 11,7 million copies in its first week. It was News' tenth consecutive album to reach the top of the chart.

== Promotion and release ==
EPCOTIA's theme is "Space Travel", as well as the previous album Neverland. It was released on two editions, regular and limited, and the limited edition contains a DVD with the video "EPCOTIA Safety Guide & Making".

The album was promoted by an arena tour, which began on March 31 in Hokkaido. The last show, on Saitama Super Arena, was recorded and released in the live album News Arena Tour 2018 Epcotia, the same name of the tour, in three editions.

== Track listing ==
All titles are stylized in all caps.

No.	Title	Length
1.	"Epcotia Safety Guide -inter-"
2.	"Epcotia"
3.	"Kingdom"
4.	"Twinkle Star"
5.	"Warp-chu -inter-" (ワープ中)
6.	"LPS"
7.	"Koisuru Wakusei" (恋する惑星)
8.	"Jump Around"
9.	"Docking -inter-" (ドッキング)
10.	"Avalon"
11.	"It's You"
12.	"Iseijin to no Kontakuto ni Tsuite" (異星人とのコンタクトについて)
13.	"UFO"
14.	"Erotica"
15.	"Blackhole"
16.	"Hoshi ni Negai o" (星に願いを)
17.	"Innocence" (イノセンス)
18.	"Kaerimichi -inter-" (帰り道)
19.	"Happy Ending"
20.	"Platonic" (プラトニック)
21.	"Ginza Rhapsody" (銀座ラプソディ)
22.	"Hyōon" (氷温)
23.	"Thunder"

DVD
No.	Title	Length
1.	"EPCOTIA Safety Guide & Making"

== Charts ==
=== Weekly charts ===
Chart (2018)	Peak position
Japanese Albums (Oricon)	1
Tower Records	1

=== Year-end charts ===
Chart (2018)	Position
Japanese Albums (Oricon)	30
