= Keiichiro Koyama =

Japanese musician (born 1984)

Keiichiro Koyama 小山 慶一郎
- Also known as: Kei-chan (K-chan), Keii-chan, Koyamacchi
- Born: 1 May 1984 (age 42); Sagamihara, Kanagawa, Japan
- Origin: Tokyo, Japan
- Genre: J-pop
- Occupations: Singer; actor
- Instrument: Vocals
- Years active: 2001–present
- Member of: NEWS
- Spouse: Misako Uno (m. 2024)
- Website: Official website NEWS Starto Entertainment website

YouTube information
- Channel: CHOIYAMA / 小山慶一郎
- Years active: 2025–present
- Subscribers: 72.1 thousand
- Views: 8.5 million
- Last updated: January 1, 2026

Keiichiro Koyama (小山 慶一郎, Koyama Keiichirō; born 1 May 1984) is a Japanese musician and leader of the Starto Entertainment group NEWS.

== Early life ==
Koyama was born in Sagamihara, Kanagawa, as the youngest of two children. His sister is Miki Fujiwara, who is a culinary expert and YouTuber.

On an episode of "NEWS na Futari", Koyama revealed that he suffered from domestic abuse from his father as a child, which led to his parents' divorce when he was in 5th grade.

In 2007, he graduated from Meiji University's department of History and Geography with a degree in Oriental History.

== Career ==
Upon entering Johnny's Entertainment on 21 January 2001, Koyama started out with the unit B.A.D. which stands for Beautiful American Dream. His second unit as a junior was B.B.D. which at first stood for Bad Boys Dancing, but was later changed to Best Beat Dancing. In October 2001, he was chosen as a member of Domoto Koichi's project, J-Support, later changed to K.K.Kity, alongside future fellow NEWS members Hironori Kusano and Shigeaki Kato. It was in this unit that Koyama started out as an announcer for shows such as the Ya-Ya-yah Show, and made hosting a part of his talents.

He is the oldest member of NEWS, which debuted in September 2003, and is often seen as the mother figure of the group.

Koyama had his own radio show called "K-chan NEWS" that was broadcast every Wednesday from April 5, 2005 to March 27, 2024 by Nippon Cultural Broadcasting. The show regularly featured segments with listeners participation, such as reading fan letters or roleplaying situations sent in by fans with the radio guests.

From 2006 until March 2011, he hosted NHK's popular TV variety show Shounen Club (Boys Club) alongside KAT-TUN member Yuichi Nakamaru. The pair shared the screen 6 years later in Fuji TV's variety special program "Otasuke JAPAN", which aired on June 14, 2017.

Koyama learned sign language to interact with hearing-impaired children when he hosted NTV's "24 Hour TV" telethon in 2009, obtaining a test level 4.

He could be seen as a newscaster on NTV's "News Every", from 2010 until 2018.

He also occasionally participated in dramas, such as Fuji TV "Ns' Aoi" and "0-gōshitsu no kyaku", as well as guest starring in his bandmate Yamashita Tomohisa's drama Kurosagi. He played Takasugi Harumi in the drama adaptation of Takasugi-san's Obento, which was aired on NTV from October 3 to December 5, 2024. This is his first leading role in a drama series.

Koyama opened a personal Twitter on March 17, 2023 and an official website on February 22, 2024. A YouTube channel and TikTok account was created on Jan 8, 2025. He has produced and starred in his own short-length drama exclusive on YouTube called "BUTLER"

On April 23, 2025, Koyama released a single called "CHOIYAMA", as part of the "CHOIYAMA Project". He also held fan meetings "CHOI Gathering" in Tokyo and Osaka. A fan meeting in Shanghai was also held on July 26, 2025.

== Scandal ==
On 8 June 2018, Koyama's entertainment career was halted. He attended a party where he gave an underage girl alcohol. The drinking age in Japan is 20 years old, and while she said she was 20 and legally able to drink, it was later discovered that she was in fact 19 years old. Koyama appeared on "News Every" on June 7 to make a public apology, in which he explained that he was not aware of the woman's real age, but acknowledged his behavior was still inappropriate and would take a break to reflect on himself. This scandal put his entire career on hold, including his entertainment activities with Johnny's Entertainment and his job as a newscaster for the program "News Every".

As of 27 June 2018, Koyama has resumed his entertainment activities. In December 2018, Koyama left the program "News Every."

== Personal life ==
Koyama met AAA's Misako Uno through friends, and started dating by fall 2022. Koyama didn't deny the relationship when interviewed by Bunshun. According to acquaintances (and as reported by Bunshun), both had been sharing their living spaces, semi-cohabitating, with the previous approval of family and agencies, having plans to marry by the end of 2024. Koyama announced the registration of his marriage to Uno on 12 March 2024, birthday of Uno's beloved father, who died in January 2023. The couple announced the birth of their first child (gender undisclosed) on 6 June 2025.

Koyama is fond of cats. He had a cat named Nyanta for 19 years and dedicated a song by the same name to the cat after its death. He now has a cat named Milk. He also writes a column for the cat magazine Neko Biyori.

== Discography ==
| Year | Title | Details |
|---|---|---|
| 2005 | DANCIN' ☆ TO ME | Featured in Nippon East to West Spring Concert DVD |
| 2005 | High TEN! | Quartet with Takahisa Masuda, Shigeaki Kato and Hironori Kusano. Featured in album touch |
| 2007 | Aribai (アリバイ) | Quartet with Takahisa Masuda, Shigeaki Kato and Yuya Tegoshi. Featured in album pacific |
| 2007 | Chirarism (チラリズム) | Duet with Shigeaki Kato. Featured in album pacific |
| 2007 | Nantoka Naru-sa (なんとかなるさ) | Vocal trio with Takahisa Masuda and Tomohisa Yamashita. Featured in album pacific |
| 2008 | Minna ga Iru Sekai wo Hitotsu ni Ai wo Motto Give & Take Shimashou (みんながいる世界を一つに愛をもっとGive ＆ Takeしましょう) | Vocal trio with Takahisa Masuda and Tomohisa Yamashita. Featured in album color |
| 2008 | Murarist (ムラリスト) | Duet with Shigeaki Kato. Featured in album color |
| 2010 | Iitaidake (言いたいだけ) | Duet with Shigeaki Kato. Featured in NEWS DOME PARTY 2010 LIVE! LIVE! LIVE! DVD! |
| 2012 | Love Addiction | Featured in album NEWS BEST |
| 2012 | Private Hearts | Featured in album NEWS BEST |
| 2012 | Uri Sarang | Featured in album NEWS BEST |
| 2012 | Starry | Featured in single Chankapana |
| 2013 | Beautiful Rain | Featured in album NEWS |
| 2015 | Romeo 2015 (ロメオ 2015) | Featured in album White |
| 2016 | Ai no Elegy (愛のエレジー) | Featured in album QUARTETTO |
| 2017 | Nyanta (ニャン太) | Featured in album NEVERLAND |
| 2018 | Ginza Rhapsody (銀座ラプソディ) | Featured in album EPCOTIA |
| 2019 | Going that way | Featured in album WORLDISTA |
| 2020 | STAY ALIVE | Featured in album STORY |
| 2022 | Refrain | Featured in album Ongaku |
| 2023 | Mikaeri Bijin (ミカエリビジン) | Featured in album NEWS EXPO |
| 2024 | clip-clop (カランコロン) | Featured in album JAPANEWS |
| 2025 | CHOIYAMA | Digital single |
| 2026 | Play Back | Featured in CHOIYAMA - Play Back 2025 DVD |
| 2026 | DROP | Featured in album KMK |

== Appearances ==
=== Dramas ===
- Kanojo ga Shinjyatta (彼女が死んじゃった) (2004) as Yoichi Matsunoki
- Genkidan Engimono (Episode 1 only) (2004) as Sanada
- Kurosagi (Episode 2 only) (2006) as Satoshi Tanabe
- Ns' Aoi (Ns'あおい) (2006) as Takeshi Kitazawa
- Hana Yome wa Yakudoshi (2006) as Jiro Azuchi
- Yukan Club (Episode 6 only) (2007) as Yuya Kariho
- Loss:Time:Life (ロス：タイム：ライフ) (Episode 2 only) (2008) as Kota Tonami
- Guests of Room 0 (0号室の客) (5th story) (2010) as Shigeto Oyama
- Lucky Seven (ラッキーセブン) (2012) as Kojiro Tokita
- Key Person of Interest Detective (重要参考人探偵) (2017) as Itsuki Suou
- Zero: The Bravest Money Game (ゼロ 一獲千金ゲーム) (Episode 9–10) (2018) as Mitsuru Goto
- Takasugi-san's Obento (高杉さん家のおべんとう) (2024) as Harumi Takasugi

=== Film ===
- Aosho! Voices in Bloom (2025), Ritsu Kihōin

=== Stage performances ===
- High School Musical (2007) as Troy Bolton
- Loss:Time:Life (2008) as Kota Tonami
- Call (2009) as Makio Yamazaki
- Room 0 (2010) as Shigeto Oyama
- Hello, Goodbye (2012) as Kumagai Ango
- Great Nature (2015) as Shinozaki

=== Variety shows ===
- Ya-Ya-yah (TV Tokyo, 2003–2007)
- Hi! Hey! Say (TV Tokyo, 2007–2009)
- Shounen Club (co-hosts with Yuichi Nakamaru) (NHK, 2006–2011)
- Ashita Tsukaeru Shinrigaku! Teppan Note (2008)
- Soukon (co-hosts with NEWS) (NTV, 2009–2010)
- news every (NTV, 2010–2018)
- Mirai Theater (co-hosts with NEWS member, Shigeaki Kato) (NTV, 2012–2015)
- Karaoke 18ban (NTV, 2015)
- Chikarauta (NTV, 2015–2017)
- Hen Lab (co-hosts with NEWS) (NTV, 2015–2016)
- NEWS na Futari (co-hosts with NEWS member, Shigeaki Kato) (TBS, 2015–2021)
- Shounen Club Premium (co-hosts with NEWS) (NHK, 2016–2019)
- Barairo Dandy (Tokyo MX, 2019–2024)
- Taichi-san (Tokai TV, 2020–2024)
- 4chan TV (MBS, 2021–)
- NEWS no Zenryoku!! Making (co-hosts with NEWS member, Shigeaki Kato) (TBS, 2021–2024)
- Uchimura no Tsuboru Douga (TV Tokyo, 2021–2023)
- NEWS Koyama no Oshakyan! Dou? (Fuji TV, 2023–)
