= Hironori Kusano =

Hironori Kusano 草野 博紀
- Born: February 15, 1988 (age 38)
- Origin: Yokohama, Kanagawa Prefecture, Japan
- Genres: J-pop
- Occupations: Singer; actor
- Years active: 2001–present
- Label: Johnny's Entertainment

Hironori Kusano (草野 博紀, Kusano Hironori; born February 15, 1988) is a Japanese singer and former member of the J-pop group NEWS, as part of Johnny's Entertainment, Inc., which he joined in February 2001.

== Biography ==
As a Johnny's Jr., Kusano had also been in other Jr. subgroups including J2000, J-support, and K.K.Kity, before he was selected as one of the nine members to debut as NEWS in 2003 along with Tomohisa Yamashita, Takahisa Masuda, Shigeaki Kato, Yuya Tegoshi, Ryo Nishikido, Keiichiro Koyama, Hiroki Uchi and Takahiro Moriuchi.

After recent news that Uchi and Kusano would be performing in "Shounentai Playzone 2007" (少年隊 PLAYZONE 2007) with other Juniors from Johnny's Entertainment, it was shortly thereafter conformed during the press conference for the recently announced Fuji TV drama "Isshun no Kaze ni Nare" (一瞬の風になれ), that Hiroki Uchi, along with Hironori Kusano, had officially graduated from their "trainee" status within Johnny's Entertainment.

=== Dramas ===
- Gekidan Engimono (劇団演技者) (2005), Ep. 13 Ie ga Tooi (家が遠い) – (A short 4-part series which also starred fellow group members Takahisa Masuda, Yuya Tegoshi, and Shigeaki Kato)

=== Radio shows ===
- News Kick and Spin Muzik as DJ, (was broadcast Thursdays @ 21:25~21.45)

=== Television ===
- The Shonen Club
- Ya-Ya-yah
- Hadaka no Shonen

=== Stage plays ===
- Playzone 2007 Change2Chance
