= Shigeaki Kato =

Japanese singer

Shigeaki Kato 加藤 シゲアキ
- Born: 加藤 成亮 (Katō Shigeaki); July 11, 1987 (age 39)
- Origin: Hiroshima, Hiroshima, Japan
- Genre: J-pop
- Occupations: Singer; actor; writer
- Instruments: Vocals; guitar
- Years active: 1999–present
- Label: ELOV-Label
- Member of: NEWS
- Website: NEWS Starto Entertainment website

Shigeaki Kato (加藤 シゲアキ, Katō Shigeaki; born July 11, 1987) is a Japanese musician, writer, actor and a member of the J-pop group NEWS, from ELOV-Label formerly known as Johnny's Entertainment.

== Early life and career ==
Kato was born in Hiroshima, Japan, but he grew up in Osaka Prefecture and Yokohama-shi. He joined Johnny's Entertainment on April 17, 1999 when he was 11 years-old. As a junior he was a member of the organizations Best Beat Boys (B.B.B.), Boys Be Ambitious (B.B.A.), Best Beat Dancing (B.B.D.), Beautiful American Dreams (B.A.D.) and J-support (later changed to K.K.Kity).

He debuted as a member of NEWS in 2003. Along with other NEWS members, he plays the guitar, composing some of NEWS' songs, including his own solo "Kakao" in 2002, which he composed the lyrics to.

In 2010, he graduated from the Faculty of Law of Aoyama Gakuin University.

Aside from music, Kato has also establish himself as an author. During early days of NEWS, he felt his presence in the group was falling behind and didn't have much solo work like other members. This combined with the lack of group activities in 2011, Kato decided that he wanted to do something not only for his career but for the band, so after getting permission from management to write a novel, he started writing Pink and Gray and finished the book in less than a year. On January 28, 2012, the book was published. This make Kato the first idol in Johnny & Associates to become an author.

Pink and Gray was later adapted into a movie in 2016, directed by Isao Yukisada and stars Yuto Nakajima formerly of Hey! Say! JUMP.

Kato has received several accolades for his written works. His 2020 novel Alternate was nominated for the Naoki Prize. In 2021, the book won Yoshikawa Eiji Literary Award for New Writers and the High School Students Naoki Prize. Alternate was also nominated for Japan Booksellers' Award.

He received a second Naoki Prize nomination in 2023, for Nare no hate.

On August 27, 2025, it was confirmed that Kato will star as Sam in the Japanese production of Danny Robins' play 2:22 A Ghost Story, directed by Shintaro Mori. The play will run from February 6 until March 16, 2026 and also stars Wakana Aoi, Nao Minamisawa and Satoru Matsuo.

=== Private life ===
On March 3, 2024, Kato announced through his groups' official website that he is getting married. The date of the ceremony has not been disclosed.

On November 10, 2026, Kato announced the birth of their first child through his agency.

== Discography ==
Year	Title	Details
2005	Survival	Featured in DVD Nippon East to West Spring Concert
2007	Alibi (アリバイ)	Duet with NEWS member, Keiichiro Koyama. Featured in album pacific
2007	Chirarizumu (チラリズム)	Duet with NEWS member, Keiichiro Koyama. Featured in DVD Never Ending Wonderful Story
2007	Kakao (カカオ)	Featured in DVD Never Ending Wonderful Story
2008	HAPPY MUSIC	Featured in DVD NEWS Concert Tour Pacific 2007 2008 – The First Tokyo Dome Concert
2008	Murarisuto (ムラリスト)	Duet with NEWS member, Keiichiro Koyama. Featured in album color
2009	Shalala Tambourine (シャララ タンバリン)	Featured in DVD NEWS Live Diamond
2010	Iitai Dake (言いたいだけ)	Duet with NEWS member, Keiichiro Koyama. Featured in DVD NEWS Dome Party 2010 Live! Live! Live! DVD!
2012	Vampire wa Kakukatariki (ヴァンパイアはかく語りき)	Featured in single Chankapana
2013	Dreamcatcher	Featured in album NEWS
2015	ESCORT	Featured in album White
2016	Hoshi no Oujisama (星の王子さま)	Featured in album QUARTETTO
2017	Ayame (あやめ)	Featured in album NEVERLAND
2018	Hyouon (氷温)	Featured in album EPCOTIA
2019	Sekai (世界)	Featured in album WORLDISTA
2020	Narrative	Featured in album STORY
2022	Agitato	Featured in album Ongaku
2023	Ninjo Shinju (人情心中)	Featured in album NEWS EXPO
2024	almond	Featured in album JAPANEWS
2025	Cocoon	Featured in album Henshin
2026	Hands	Featured in album KMK

== Filmography ==
=== Dramas ===
Year	Title	Role	Network	Note
1999	Scary Sunday		NTV	Episode 5: Tomodachi no J-kun
2000	SPACE ANGEL 2001 Yen Uchu no Tabi	Masaru	NTV	
2000	Scary Sunday ~2000~		NTV	Episode 16: Tsuri sagaru
2000	Shijo Saiaku no Deto	Ikeda Shingoto	NTV	The 1st Dates: Shijo saiaku no hatsu deto!?
2001	Shounen wa Tori ni Natta		TBS	
2001	3-nen B-gumi Kinpachi sensei	Hasegawa Ken	TBS	Season 6
2004	Home Drama!	Inaba	TBS	Episode 9
2004	3-nen B-gumi Kinpachi sensei	Hasegawa Ken	TBS	Season 7, episode 11
2005	Gekidan Engimono	Kojima	Fuji TV	Episode 13: Ie ga Tooi
2006	Busu no Hitomi ni Koishiteru	Shimizu Kota	Fuji TV	
2006	Gekidan Engimono	Ueno	Fuji TV	Episode 20: Car Radio ga Owareba
2006	Kakure Karakuri	Abe Tomonari	TBS	
2007	Seven Days of a Daddy and a Daughter	Osugi Kenta	TBS	
2007	Sugata Sanshiro	Sugata Sanshiro	TV Tokyo	
2008	Hokaben	Katase Riichiro	NTV	
2009	Chichi yo, Anata wa Erakatta ~1969 Nen no Oyaji to Boku	Onodera Masaru	TBS	
2009	0 Goushitsu no Kyaku	Yazaki	Fuji TV	Story 3: Kampeki na Otoko
2010	Troubleman	Tokuda Kazuo	TV Tokyo	
2011	Shin Jidan Koshonin Ura File	Hashima Ippei	TBS	
2011	Hanawake no Yon Shimai	Shozaburo Mashiko	TBS	
2011	3-nen B-gumi Kinpachi sensei Final Special	Hasegawa Ken	TBS	
2012	Hana no Zubora Meshi	Osoi	TBS/MBS	
2012	Blackboard ~Jidai to Tatakatta Kyōshi tachi~	Kumatani Shota	TBS	Third Night: Yume
2012	Shin Jidan Koshonin Ura File 2	Hashima Ippei	TBS	
2014	Shitsuren Chocolatier	Hiroaki Sekiya	Fuji TV	
2014	Shin Jidan Koshonin Ura File 3	Hashima Ippei	TBS	
2014	Shin Jidan Koshonin Ura File 4	Hashima Ippei	TBS	
2015	Taishi Kakka no Ryourinin	Satoru Eguchi	Fuji TV	
2016	Kasa wo Motanai Aritachi wa	Keisuke Murata	Fuji TV	
2016	Toki wo Kakeru Shoujo	Kazutaka Yano	NTV	
2016	Momoku no Yoshinori Sensei ~Hikari wo Ushinatte Kokoro ga Mieta~	Yoshinori Arai	NTV	
2017	Kirawareru Yuuki	Toshio Aoyama	NTV	
2017	Jidai o Tsukutta Otoko Akuyū Monogatari	Shunichi Tokura	NTV	
2018	Zero: The Bravest Money Game	Ukai Zero	NTV	
2018	Inugamike no Ichizoku	Kindaichi Kousuke	Fuji TV	
2019	Yotsuba Ginkou Harashima Hiromi ga Monomousu ~Kono Hito ni Kakero~	Kazuhiro Yamane	TV Tokyo	Episode 3
2019	Akuma no Temari Uta ~Kindaichi Kousuke, Futatabi~	Kindaichi Kousuke	Fuji TV	
2020	Yoru ga Dorehodo Kurakutemo	Wataru Inami	WOWOW	
2021	Rokujoma no Piano Man	Kenji Murasawa	NHK	
2021	Yonimo Kimyou na Monogatari Natsu no Tokubetsu Hen	Kimura Takashi	Fuji TV	Sanzu River Outlet Park
2021	Byoin no Naoshikata ~Special~	Natsume Shō	TV Tokyo	
2021	The Winner of February: An Absolutely Qualified Classroom	Jun Haitani	NTV	
2021	Kenjushou ~Mistukunikou to Ore~	Nishiki Hyōnosuke	NHK	
2022	Skylock's Children	Takino Makoto	WOWOW	
2023	Manten no Goal	Takashi Mikami	NHK	
2023	Akinai Senden Gold and Silver	Sōji	NHK	
2025	Natsume Sōseki ~Wagahai ga Aishita Higo no Kuni Yori~	Natsume Sōseki	TKU	
2025	Akinai Seiden Gold and Silver 2	Sōji	NHK	
2025	Shin Tokyo Shuijou Keisatsu	Kusakabe Jun	Fuji TV	
2026	Conbini Kyoudai – Tenderness Mojikou Kogane Mura Ten	Kazuhito Shiba	NHK	

=== Variety shows ===
Year	Title	Network	Note
2003–2007	Ya-Ya-yah	TV Tokyo	Regular
2009–2010	Soukon	NTV	Co-hosts with Keiichiro Koyama, Takahisa Masuda and Yuya Tegoshi
2011	Ariyoshi Japon	TBS	Irregular panelist
2011	Bakushōmondai no taihen yoku dekimashita!	TV Tokyo	Panelist
2012–2015	Mirai Theater	NTV	Co-hosts with Keiichiro Koyama and Shinichi Hatori
2015–2021	NEWS na Futari	TBS	Co-hosts with Keiichiro Koyama
2015–2024	Typewriters ~Monokaki no Sekai~	Fuji TV	Co-hosts with Naoki Matayoshi
2015–2019	Hakunetsu Live Bibitto	TBS	Friday regular panelist
2015–2016	Hen Labo	NTV	Co-hosts with Keiichiro Koyama, Takahisa Masuda and Yuya Tegoshi
2015	ZERO Culture Spin-off: Idols Now and Then	NTV	A conversation with Arashi's Satoshi Ohno and Sho Sakurai
2016–2019	Shounen Club Premium	NHK BS Premium	Co-hosts with Keiichiro Koyama, Takahisa Masuda and Yuya Tegoshi
2017–2018	Inochi no Uta	NHK	Main MC
2018	Tabisuru Rakugo	Fuji TV	Guest
2021–2023	3-minute Documentary	NHK	Regular
2021–2024	NEWS no Zenryoku!! Making	TBS	Co-hosts with Keiichiro Koyama
2022	100-minute Masterpiece for teens	NHK	Main MC
2022–2023	Hokkaidō ga "Ikki Mi" Special	NHK	Regular
2023	Eien ni Kataritsugitai ~Mirai e Nokosu, Ano Toki no Kioku~	NHK	Navigator
2025	Koichi & Shige's SHOW Man!!	TV Asahi	Co-hosts with Koichi Domoto

=== Stage plays ===
Year	Title	Role	Performance Term
2008	Konnan Yatte Mimashita		The Globe Tokyo: July 14 – July 30; Osaka Theater Drama City: August 2 – August 8
2009	SEMINAR	Lauren	The Globe Tokyo: May 17 – June 3; Osaka Theater Drama City: June 9 – June 14
2011	6 gatsu no Bitter Orange	Tatsuya Fukano	The Globe Tokyo: June 3 – June 26; Morinomiya Piloti Hall, Osaka: July 1 – July 6
2014	Naka no Hito	Koichi Sakazaki	The Globe Tokyo: April 25 – May 11; Osaka Theater Drama City: May 16 – May 18
2017	The Green Mile	Paul Edgecomb	The Globe Tokyo: September 30 – October 22; Kyoto Theater: November 4 – November 8
2021	Modern Boys	Kanade Yahagi	New National Theater, Tokyo: April 3 – April 16
2022	Shukushuku to Unshin	Hajime Tsukino	PARCO Theater, Tokyo: March 8 – March 27; Morinomiya Piloti Hall, Osaka: April 8 – April 10
2023	Edmond: The Man Who Wrote Cyrano de Bergerac	Edmond Rostand	New National Theater, Tokyo: April 1 – April 16; Higashiosaka City Cultural Creation Center Dream House Large Hall: April 22 – April 24
2025	Edmond: The Man Who Wrote Cyrano de Bergerac	Edmond Rostand	PARCO Theater, Tokyo: April 7 – April 30; Higashiosaka City Cultural Creation Center Dream House Large Hall: May 9 – May 10; Fukuoka Civic Hall Large Hall: May 17 – May 18; Toyota Civic Cultural Center Large Hall: May 24
2025	Katashiro～Relive vol.2～	Patient	PARCO Theater, Tokyo: August 2
2026	2:22 A Ghost Story	Sam	Theater Creation, Tokyo: February 6 – March 1; Tokai City Arts Theater Large Hall: March 6 – March 8; Sky Tower MBS, Osaka: March 12 – March 16

=== Films ===
- Pink and Gray (2016, cameo appearance)
- Shibuya, 1 and 0 (2022, directed and starred)
- SUNA (『MIRRORLIAR FILMS Season 7』, May 9, 2025, directed and starred)

== Other works ==
=== Essay ===
- Dekiru koto nara Steed de (Essay collection, Asahi shinbun sha, March 6, 2020)
  - Cuba no reimei (Asahi shinbun sha『shousetu TRIPPER』Spring edition 2016)
  - Dekiru koto nara Steed de (Asahi shinbun sha『shousetu TRIPPER』Winter edition 2016 – 2019)
  - Last Trip Mitei

=== Novels ===
- Pink and Gray (Kadokawa Shoten, 2012)
- Senko Scramble (Kadokawa Shoten, 2013)
- Burn (Kadokawa Shoten, 2014)
- Kasa wo Motanai Aritachi wa (Kadokawa Shoten, 2015)
- tuberose de matteru【AGE22】(Fusou sha『shu-kan SPA!』, 2016)
- tuberose de matteru【AGE32】(Fusou sha, 2017)
- Alternate (Shinchosha, 2020)
- Nare no hate (Kodansha, 2023)
- Miakis Symphony (Magazine House, 2025)

=== Productions ===
- Kasa wo Motanai Aritachi wa (2016) as Original work
- Pink and Gray (2016) as Original work
- AmberS (2026) as Original work

=== Radio ===
- SHIGET TOGETHER (2005 – 2008, Sundays weekly from 11:00 pm~11:30 pm, FM-FUJI)
- SORASHIGE BOOK (2011 – present, Sundays weekly from 11:00 pm~11:30 pm, FM Yokohama)
- Kato Shigeaki Sasanai Sawai (May 1, 2024, August 30, 2025, JOLF)

=== Short story ===
- Daiji na mono (Kadokawa Shoten,『shousetsu Yasei jidai』January 2016)
- Oresama no iutoori (Kadokawa Shoten,『shousetsu Yasei jidai』August 2016)
- Watashi to Torida Ageha (Kadokawa,『Lawson Walker 50th Anniversary Book』June 13, 2025)
- Thirty Stripes (Asahi shinbun sha,『shousetsu TRIPPER』Summer 2025 Issue, June 17, 2025)

=== Serialization ===
- Wagahai wa Shige de aru (Johnny's web, 2005 – 2008)
- Aoi hitorigoto (Shueisha『Myojo』July 2006 – June 2011)
- photo shigenic (Wani Books『Wink Up』December 2007 – March 2016)
- GIRL FRIENDS (Shueisha『Myojo』May 2012 – October 2019)
- Shigeaki no Cloud (Johnny's web, November 2015 – 2023, FAMILY CLUB web, 2023 – April 2025)
  - Shigeaki no Koe (FAMILY CLUB web April 2025 – present)
- Dekiru koto nara Steed de (Asahi shinbun sha『shousetsu TRIPPER』Winter edition 2016 – 2019)
- Sidecar Sanka (RiCE press『RiCE』February 4, 2022 – present)
