= Chosen Home (TV series) =

2025 Japanese television series

- Promotional poster
- ぼくたちん家
- Genre: Slice of life; BL; Romance
- Written by: Yuki Matsumoto
- Directed by: Kujiraoka Hironori; Hitomi Kitagawa
- Starring: Mitsuhiro Oikawa; Yuya Tegoshi; Tamaki Shiratori
- Theme music composer: Hiroto Kōmoto
- Ending theme: Baumkuchen by Mitsuhiro Oikawa, Yuya Tegoshi, and Tamaki Shiratori
- Country of origin: Japan
- Original language: Japanese
- No. of episodes: 10

Production
- Executive producer: Kyoko Matsumoto
- Producers: Hidehiro Kono; Kishu Nishi (NTV AXON); Mayumi Okataku (Avans Gate)
- Running time: 60 minutes

Original release
- Network: Nippon Television; Netflix; TVer
- Release: October 12 – December 14, 2025

Chosen Home (Japanese: ぼくたちん家, transl. Bokutachinchi) is a 2025 Japanese television drama series starring Mitsuhiro Oikawa, Yuya Tegoshi, and Tamaki Shiratori. An episode was released every Sunday from October 12 to December 14, 2025, globally in Netflix, and aired in Japan on Nippon TV and in various OTT platforms such as Hulu and TVer.

== Synopsis ==
Genichi Hatano (Mitsuhiro Oikawa), a lonely 50-year-old gay animal keeper, longs for companionship, while Saku Sakuta (Yuya Tegoshi), a disillusioned 38-year-old teacher, has given up on love after a breakup. When they meet by chance, Genichi suggests creating their own meaning for love by buying a house together as a symbol of commitment. Their unconventional plan takes a surprising turn when Saku's student, Hotaru Kusonoki (Tamaki Shiratori), offers to buy them a house using her hidden fortune.

== Cast ==
=== Main ===
- Mitsuhiro Oikawa as Genichi Hatano
- Yuya Tegoshi as Saku Sakuta
- Tamaki Shiratori as Hotaru Kusunoki

=== Supporting ===
- Naoki Tanaka as Seiji Okabe
- Nagisa Shibuya as Madoka Momose
- Maki Sakai as Kyoko Inokashira
- Kai Inowaki as Ryota Yoshida
- Ken Mitsuishi as Jin Ichigaya
- Kumiko Aso as Tomoe Kusunoki
- Shiori Doi as Umeko Matsu
- Maki Kubota as Mio Kurita
- Rio Kawaguchi as Tatsuya Fujisawa
- Ryohei Otani as Yutaro Koito
- Miyu Oshima as Nacchi
- Anna Hoshino as Bayashiko
- Sinnosuke Nishiura as Myoga

=== Others ===
- Durian Lollobrigida as Koito's friend
- Usak as Koito's friend
- Kemio as Koito's partner
- Saori Yuki as Chiyoko Hatano
- Haruka Imou as BL manga artist
- Hinata Hiiragi as Kazuki Kishibe

== Episodes ==
No.	Title	Directed by	Original release date
1	"Humans are born for love and revolution"	Hironori Kujiraoka	October 12, 2025
Genichi Hatano is a 50-year-old gay man searching for companionship. One day, he meets a girl who possesses a large amount of money.
2	"I don't need love or anything. Just pretend to be my parent."	Hironori Kujiraoka	October 19, 2025
Genichi is taken aback by Hotaru's unconventional offer of a life-changing amount of money in exchange for him serving as her parent.
3	"Gay dad. That's so cool."	Hironori Kujiraoka	October 26, 2025
Having signed Hotaru's parent-child contract, Genichi begins his unconventional new family life. Hotaru's deadbeat dad makes an unexpected appearance.
4	"If it's gone, it was there."	Hironori Kujiraoka	November 2, 2025
Genichi grows depressed after Saku ignores his confession of love. Later, Jin kidnaps Hotaru, hoping to lay claim to the 30 million yen.
5	"The money I didn't get: 32,261,570 yen"	Hitomi Kitagawa	November 9, 2025
As Saku moves into the apartment, his ex, Yoshida, appears unexpectedly. Meanwhile, the truth about Tomoe's embezzlement come to light.
6	"Is it okay if we have mutual feelings?"	Hitomi Kitagawa	November 16, 2025
Genichi decides that he wants to apologize to the person he once hurt, sparking jealousy in Saku. Later, Hotaru reunites with her mother.
7	"Three steps to a happy ending"	Hironori Kujiraoka	November 23, 2025
Genichi's mother comes to Tokyo and is thrilled to learn of his plans with Saku. Later, she goes to a manga artist's book signing event with Hotaru.
8	"Give me wings"	Hitomi Kitagawa	November 30, 2025
During a trial cohabitation, Saku notices one of Genichi's habits. Later, Officer Matsu comes to put an end to Saku and Genichi living with Hotaru.
9	"I will give up positively"	Hironori Kujiraoka	December 7, 2025
Someone runs off with the 30 million yen. Later, Genichi and Saku continue their search for an ideal place to live their life together.
10	"There is nothing in this world that doesn't concern me"	Hironori Kujiraoka	December 14, 2025
Genichi and Saku support Hotaru's dream of becoming a guitar maker. Later, they make a bold move with their marriage registration form in hand.

== Accolades ==
Name of the award ceremony, year presented, category, nominee of the award, and the result of the nomination
Award ceremony	Year	Category	Nominee / Work	Result	Ref.
HUB Awards	2025	Best Social Critique	Chosen Home	Won	
