= List of Oricon number-one albums of 2019 =

The following is a list of Oricon number-one albums of 2019, which uses data from combined (physical, digital, and streaming) and physical sales.

== Chart history ==
=== Combined sales ===
| Issue date | Album | Artist(s) | Reference(s) |
|---|---|---|---|
| January 7 | Pop Virus | Gen Hoshino | |
| January 14 | Pop Virus | Gen Hoshino | |
| January 21 | Bohemian Rhapsody: The Original Soundtrack | Queen | |
| January 28 | Flava | Little Glee Monster | |
| February 4 | You Made My Dawn | Seventeen | |
| February 11 | I Won't Let You Go | Got7 | |
| February 18 | Nissy Entertainment 5th Anniversary Best | Nissy | |
| February 25 | Eye of the Storm | One Ok Rock | |
| March 4 | Worldista | NEWS | |
| March 11 | Lip | Sekai no Owari | |
| March 18 | #Twice2 | Twice | |
| March 25 | Pages | Sexy Zone | |
| April 1 | Best! Morning Musume 20th Anniversary | Morning Musume '19 | |
| April 8 | Magic | Back Number | |
| April 15 | Magic | Back Number | |
| April 22 | Flawless Love | Jaejoong | |
| April 29 | Ima ga Omoide ni Naru Made | Nogizaka46 | |
| May 6 | Free Hugs! | Kis-My-Ft2 | |
| May 13 | Fancy You | Twice | |
| May 20 | Utamonogatari 2 – Monogatari Series Theme Songs Compilation Album | Various artists | |
| May 27 | Momoiro Clover Z | Momoiro Clover Z | |
| June 3 | Ballistik Boyz | Ballistik Boyz from Exile Tribe | |
| June 10 | New Love | B'z | |
| June 17 | Aiko no Uta | Aiko | |
| June 24 | Ima wa Ima de Chikai wa Emi de | Zutomayo | |
| July 1 | King & Prince | King & Prince | |
| July 8 | 5x20 All the Best!! 1999–2019 | Arashi | |
| July 15 | Strawberry Love! | Strawberry Prince | |
| July 22 | Aurora Arc | Bump of Chicken | |
| July 29 | 5x20 All the Best!! 1999–2019 | Arashi | |
| August 5 | Weathering with You | Radwimps | |
| August 12 | Ignite | KAT-TUN | |
| August 19 | Churu Sama! | 26-ji no Masquerade | |
| August 26 | Naralien | Endrecheri | |
| September 2 | 5x20 All the Best!! 1999–2019 | Arashi | |
| September 9 | Famous | Taemin | |
| September 16 | Itsuka, Sono Hi Ga Kuru Hi Made... | Eikichi Yazawa | |
| September 23 | Turntable | Mariya Takeuchi | |
| September 30 | Perfume the Best "P Cubed" | Perfume | |
| October 7 | Love Covers | Jaejoong | |
| October 14 | An Ode | Seventeen | |
| October 21 | Traveler | Official Hige Dandism | |
| October 28 | XV | Tohoshinki | |
| November 4 | Cominatcha!! | Wanima | |
| November 11 | Parade | Hey! Say! JUMP | |
| November 18 | Uta no Prince-sama: Solo Best Album: Syo Kurusu "Sweet Kiss" | Hiro Shimono | |
| November 25 | Apple of Universal Gravity | Ringo Sheena | |
| December 2 | &Twice | Twice | |
| December 9 | Bad Ass Temple Funky Sounds | Bad Ass Temple | |
| December 16 | Unser | Uverworld | |
| December 23 | Nomad | Ryo Nishikido | |
| December 30 | Playlist | Shiritsu Ebisu Chugaku | |

=== Physical sales ===
| Issue date | Album | Artist(s) | Reference(s) |
|---|---|---|---|
| January 7 | Pop Virus | Gen Hoshino | |
| January 14 | Pop Virus | Gen Hoshino | |
| January 21 | Pop Virus | Gen Hoshino | |
| January 28 | Flava | Little Glee Monster | |
| February 4 | You Made My Dawn | Seventeen | |
| February 11 | I Won't Let You Go | Got7 | |
| February 18 | Nissy Entertainment 5th Anniversary Best | Nissy | |
| February 25 | Eye of the Storm | One Ok Rock | |
| March 4 | Worldista | NEWS | |
| March 11 | Lip | Sekai no Owari | |
| March 18 | #Twice2 | Twice | |
| March 25 | Pages | Sexy Zone | |
| April 1 | Best! Morning Musume 20th Anniversary | Morning Musume '19 | |
| April 8 | Magic | Back Number | |
| April 15 | Magic | Back Number | |
| April 22 | Flawless Love | Jaejoong | |
| April 29 | Ima ga Omoide ni Naru Made | Nogizaka46 | |
| May 6 | Free Hugs! | Kis-My-Ft2 | |
| May 13 | Fancy You | Twice | |
| May 20 | Utamonogatari 2 – Monogatari Series Theme Songs Compilation Album | Various artists | |
| May 27 | Momoiro Clover Z | Momoiro Clover Z | |
| June 3 | Ballistik Boyz | Ballistik Boyz from Exile Tribe | |
| June 10 | New Love | B'z | |
| June 17 | Aiko no Uta | Aiko | |
| June 24 | Ima wa Ima de Chikai wa Emi de | Zutomayo | |
| July 1 | King & Prince | King & Prince | |
| July 8 | 5x20 All the Best!! 1999–2019 | Arashi | |
| July 15 | Strawberry Love! | Strawberry Prince | |
| July 22 | Aurora Arc | Bump of Chicken | |
| July 29 | 5x20 All the Best!! 1999–2019 | Arashi | |
| August 5 | 5x20 All the Best!! 1999–2019 | Arashi | |
| August 12 | Ignite | KAT-TUN | |
| August 19 | Churu Sama! | 26-ji no Masquerade | |
| August 26 | Naralien | Endrecheri | |
| September 2 | 5x20 All the Best!! 1999–2019 | Arashi | |
| September 9 | Famous | Taemin | |
| September 16 | Itsuka, Sono Hi Ga Kuru Hi Made... | Eikichi Yazawa | |
| September 23 | Turntable | Mariya Takeuchi | |
| September 30 | Perfume the Best "P Cubed" | Perfume | |
| October 7 | Love Covers | Jaejoong | |
| October 14 | An Ode | Seventeen | |
| October 21 | Traveler | Official Hige Dandism | |
| October 28 | XV | Tohoshinki | |
| November 4 | Cominatcha!! | Wanima | |
| November 11 | Parade | Hey! Say! JUMP | |
| November 18 | Uta no Prince-sama: Solo Best Album: Syo Kurusu "Sweet Kiss" | Hiro Shimono | |
| November 25 | Apple of Universal Gravity | Ringo Sheena | |
| December 2 | &Twice | Twice | |
| December 9 | Bad Ass Temple Funky Sounds | Bad Ass Temple | |
| December 16 | Unser | Uverworld | |
| December 23 | Nomad | Ryo Nishikido | |
| December 30 | Fate Song Material | Various artists | |

== See also ==
- List of Oricon number-one singles of 2019
