= Hironori =

- Gender: Male

Origin
- Origin: Japanese
- Meaning: Different meanings depending on the kanji used

Hironori (written: 浩典, 浩徳, 浩得, 博紀, 宏範, 大徳, 宏典 or 弘則) is a masculine Japanese given name. Notable people with the name include:

- Hironori Ishikawa (石川 大徳; born 1988), Japanese footballer
- Hironori Kusano (草野 博紀; born 1988), Japanese singer and idol
- Hironori Miyata (宮田 浩徳; born 1960), Japanese voice actor
- Hironori Nishi (西 弘則; born 1987), Japanese footballer
- Hironori Ōtsuka (大塚 博紀; 1892–1982), Japanese kareteka
- Hironori Saruta (猿田 浩得; born 1982), Japanese footballer
- Hironori Takeuchi (竹内 浩典; born 1964), Japanese racing driver
- Tokitsunada Hironori (時津洋 宏典; 1969–2019), Japanese sumo wrestler
