= NEWS (album) =

Studio album by NEWS
- Released: July 17, 2013
- Genre: J-pop
- Label: Johnny's Entertainment
- Producer: Johnny H. Kitagawa

NEWS chronology
Live (2010)	NEWS (2013)	White (2015)

Singles from NEWS
- 1. "Chankapana" Released: July 18, 2012; 2. "WORLD QUEST/Pokopon Pekorya" Released: December 12, 2012

NEWS is the fifth studio album by a Japanese boy band, NEWS released on July 17, 2013. The album was released in limited edition A, limited edition B and regular edition. The limited edition A comes with bonus DVD, limited edition B comes with 32-page booklet and 1 bonus CD which includes 4 solo tracks and regular edition comes with 1 bonus track.

== Album information ==
After the departure of two members in 2011, Johnny’s group NEWS continued their activities as a quartet. The new NEWS now finally releasing their new self-titled full-length album NEWS is their first album in almost three years.

Limited Edition A (CD+DVD)
No.	Title	Length
1.	"~compass~"	1:47
2.	"WORLD QUEST"	3:32
3.	"4+FAN"	3:22
4.	"Nagisa no Onee Sama (渚のお姉サマー)"	4:22
5.	"Pokopon Pekorya (ポコポンペコーリャ)"	3:58
6.	"Koi Matsuri (恋祭り)"	4:16
7.	"Greedier"	4:09
8.	"Besame Mucho ~Kuruoshii Borero~ (ベサメ･ムーチョ～狂おしいボレロ～)"	3:49
9.	"Chankapana (チャンカパーナ)"	4:23
10.	"Dance in the Dark"	4:10
11.	"HIGHER GROUND"	3:23
12.	"Full Swing (フルスイング)"	4:27
13.	"Life Of NEWS"	1:37:22

Limited Edition B (CD)
No.	Title	Length
1.	"Beautiful Rain"	4:01
2.	"Dreamcatcher"	3:56
3.	"Remedy"	3:35
4.	"Lovin' U"	4:35

Regular Edition (CD)
No.	Title	Length
13.	"CRY"	4:56

== Release history ==
Version	Date	Format	Distributor
Japan	July 17, 2013	LE A (JECN-323) LE B (JECN-325) RE (JECN-327)	Johnny's Entertainment
Hong Kong	August 17, 2013	LE A RE	Avex Asia Limited
Taiwan	August 17, 2013	LE B	Avex Asia Limited
