= Lollobrigida (disambiguation) =

Gina Lollobrigida (1927–2023) was an Italian actress, model, photojournalist and sculptor.

Lollobrigida may also refer to:

== People ==
- Durian Lollobrigida (born 1984), Japanese actor, singer, drag performer and television host
- Francesca Lollobrigida (born 1991), Italian speed skater
- Francesco Lollobrigida (born 1972), Italian lawyer and politician
- Guido Lollobrigida (1928–2014), also known as Lee Burton, Italian actor

== Other uses ==
- Lollobrigida Girls, Croatian electro-pop/synthpop band
