= Kasa wo Motanai Aritachi wa =

- 傘をもたない蟻たちは
- Screenplay by: Makoto Ogawa
- Story by: Shigeaki Kato
- Directed by: Keita Kono
- Country of origin: Japan
- Original language: Japanese

Original release
- Release: January 9 – January 30, 2016

"Kasa wo Motanai Aritachi wa" (Japanese: 傘をもたない蟻たちは) is a 2016 Japanese short drama series consisting of four twenty-five minute episodes (stories) directed by Keita Kono. It was released in Japan by Fuji TV weekly from January 9 to January 30. The series is based on the collection of short stories, of the same title, by Shigeaki Kato.

== Plot ==
Jun Hashimoto is an unsuccessful sci-fi novel writer who struggles with a task given by his manager. To write a short love themed story for a magazine directed towards young people. One evening he is visited by his home town friend Keisuke Murata. While catching up, Keisuke tries to help Jun, by bringing up different ideas and kinds of love.

== Cast ==
- Renn Kiriyama
- Shigeaki Kato
- Masanobu Sakata
- Nao Minamisawa
- Rika Adachi
- Mai Watanabe
- Chise Niitsu
- Raita Ryu
- Ryota Kobayashi
- Riku Ichikawa
- Rina Takeda
