= The Boyfriend (TV series) =

Japanese reality dating show

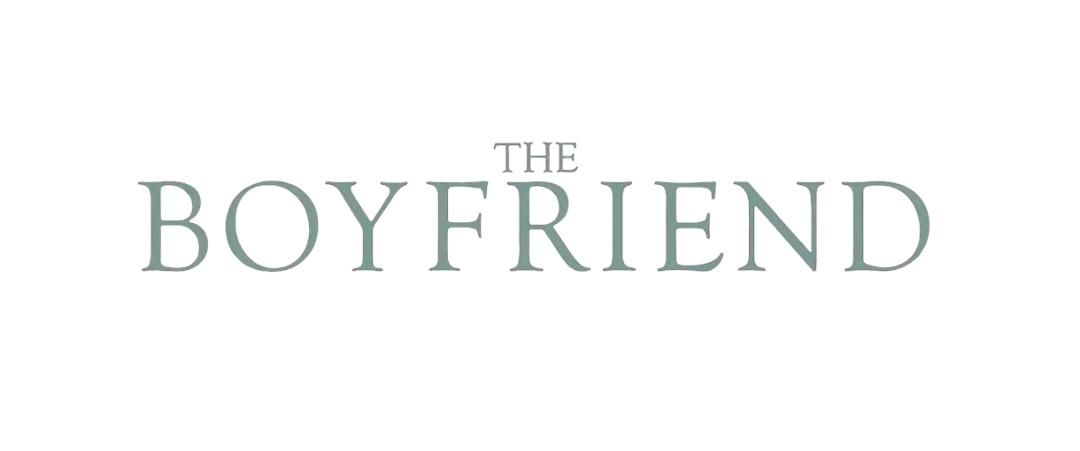
- Japanese: ボーイフレンド
- Genre: Reality television; Dating show
- Directed by: Keisuke Hishida; Kazuhiko Kudo; Kotaro Nagayama; Riho Yoshida
- Starring: see Cast
- Country of origin: Japan
- Original language: Japanese
- No. of seasons: 2
- No. of episodes: 25

Production
- Executive producer: Dai Ota
- Producers: Keisuke Hishida (C.P.); Taiki Takahashi; Sae Yamanochi
- Editors: Kosuke Maeda; Masaki Okawa
- Running time: 37–53 minutes
- Production companies: Netflix; Kyodo Television

Original release
- Network: Netflix
- Release: July 9, 2024 – present

The Boyfriend (Japanese: ボーイフレンド, Hepburn: Bōifurendo) is a Japanese reality dating show. It was the nation's first same-sex dating program. The first season premiered on Netflix on July 9, 2024.

Commentators are Megumi, Chiaki Horan, Thelma Aoyama, Durian Lollobrigida, and Yoshimi Tokui.

== Format ==
The show features a cast of Japanese or East Asian gay or bisexual men. They navigate their daily lives while cohabiting in a shared residence known as the "Green Room". Each day, one cast member is selected by the show's unseen producers to run a coffee truck; that cast member may select one other participant (with an additional option of choosing two others later on the show) to run the truck with him on that day. The coffee truck allows participants to deepen their relationship without interference from the rest of the cast, who remain at the Green Room and maintain the house, relax, or socialize. Periodically, the cast are allowed to indicate who they would like to take on a more conventional date; each participant gets only one vote, and only mutual matches get to go on a date. The show is not a competition, and no participants are eliminated.

Periodically, the show cuts to a panel of commentators chaired by Megumi, who discuss the cast's actions and relationships, and offer their own opinions on who should date whom. They also provide additional commentary and insight regarding homosexuality in Japan and LGBT rights in Japan.

== Cast ==
Season	Entrance	Name	Age	Occupation	Episodes
1	1	Dai (ダイ)	23	University student	1–10
1	2	Taeheon (テホン)	34	Product designer	1–10
1	3	Ryota (リョウタ)	28	Model and barista	1–10
1	4	Gensei (ゲンセイ)	34	Hair and makeup artist	1–9
1	5	Shun (シュン)	23	Artist and DJ	1–10
1	6	Kazuto (カズト)	27	Japanese cuisine chef	1-2, 4–10
1	7	Usak (ユーサク)	36	Go-go dancer	1–5
1	8	Alan (アラン)	28	IT worker	3–10
1	9	Ikuo (イクオ)	22	Burger shop worker	6–10
2	1	Bomi (ボミ)	23	University student	1–15
2	2	Jobu (ジョウブ)	26	Marketer	1–15
2	3	Izaya (イザヤ)	32	IT sales worker	1–10; 15
2	4	Hiroya (ヒロヤ)	29	Art director	1–7, 10-15
2	5	William (ウィリアム)	34	IT company project manager	1–10; 15
2	6	Kazuyuki (カズユキ)	40	Telecom sales worker	1–11; 15
2	7	Huwei (フーウェイ)	26	Graduate student	1–15
2	8	Ryuki (リュウキ)	20	University student	4–15
2	9	Tomoaki (トモアキ)	31	IT company project manager	8–15
2	10	Taeheon (テホン)	35	Product designer	7–15

== Episodes ==
Season	Episodes	Originally released	
Season	Episodes	First released	Last released
1	10	July 9, 2024	July 30, 2024
2	15	January 13, 2026	February 3, 2026

=== Season 1 (2024) ===
No. overall	No. in season	Title	Original release date	Prod. code
Week 1
1	1	"That Summer, I Fell in Love With Him"; Transliteration: "Sono natsu, boku wa kare ni koi o shita" (Japanese: その夏、僕は彼に恋をした)	July 9, 2024	TBF-101
2	2	"Getting to Know the Real You"; Transliteration: "Boku no shiranakatta, kimi no sugao" (Japanese: 僕の知らなかった、君の素顔)	July 9, 2024	TBF-102
3	3	"A Kiss Would Make Things Clear"; Transliteration: "Kisu o sureba, subete wakaru yo" (Japanese: キスをすれば、すべてわかるよ)	July 9, 2024	TBF-103
Week 2
4	4	"One Step Closer"; Transliteration: "Ato issenchi no yūki" (Japanese: あと1センチの勇気)	July 16, 2024	TBF-104
5	5	"I Don't Need an Answer"; Transliteration: "Henji wa iranai" (Japanese: 返事はいらない)	July 16, 2024	TBF-105
6	6	"Welcome to a Stormy Picnic"; Transliteration: "Arashi no pikunikku ni, yōkoso" (Japanese: 嵐のピクニックに、ようこそ)	July 16, 2024	TBF-106
Week 3
7	7	"There's Nothing I Want Now"; Transliteration: "Kanaetai negai nanka, nakunatta" (Japanese: 叶えたい願いなんか、なくなった)	July 23, 2024	TBF-107
8	8	"Did You Wait Long? I've Been Waiting Forever"; Transliteration: "「Matta?」 「Matasasugi」" (Japanese: 「待った？」「待たせすぎ」)	July 23, 2024	TBF-108
Week 4
9	9	"Accepting You No Matter What"; Transliteration: "Donna kimi demo, ukeireru" (Japanese: どんな君でも、受け入れる)	July 30, 2024	TBF-109
10	10	"I Don't Want This to End"; Transliteration: "Koko de owari ni shitakunai" (Japanese: ここで終わりにしたくない)	July 30, 2024	TBF-110

=== Season 2 (2026) ===
No. overall	No. in season	Title	Original release date	Prod. code
Week 1
11	1	"This Winter, We Meet Again"	January 13, 2026	TBA
12	2	"I Remember, You Forgot"	January 13, 2026	TBA
13	3	"I'm Not Right for You"	January 13, 2026	TBA
14	4	"In the Wake of Repeated Spirals"	January 13, 2026	TBA
15	5	"Masking Tears with Sweat"	January 13, 2026	TBA
16	6	"These Feelings May Not Last"	January 13, 2026	TBA
Week 2
17	7	"Love by a Misty Lake"	January 20, 2026	TBA
18	8	"Once More for Love"	January 20, 2026	TBA
19	9	"Until the Flames Go Out"	January 20, 2026	TBA
Week 3
20	10	"The Day We Leave Youth Behind"	January 27, 2026	TBA
21	11	"Beyond Goodbye"	January 27, 2026	TBA
22	12	"Won't Back Down"	January 27, 2026	TBA
Week 4
23	13	"Even If Our Bodies Intertwine"	February 3, 2026	TBA
24	14	"You Won't Sleep Next to Me"	February 3, 2026	TBA
25	15	"Will You Be My First Boyfriend?"	February 3, 2026	TBA

== Production and release ==
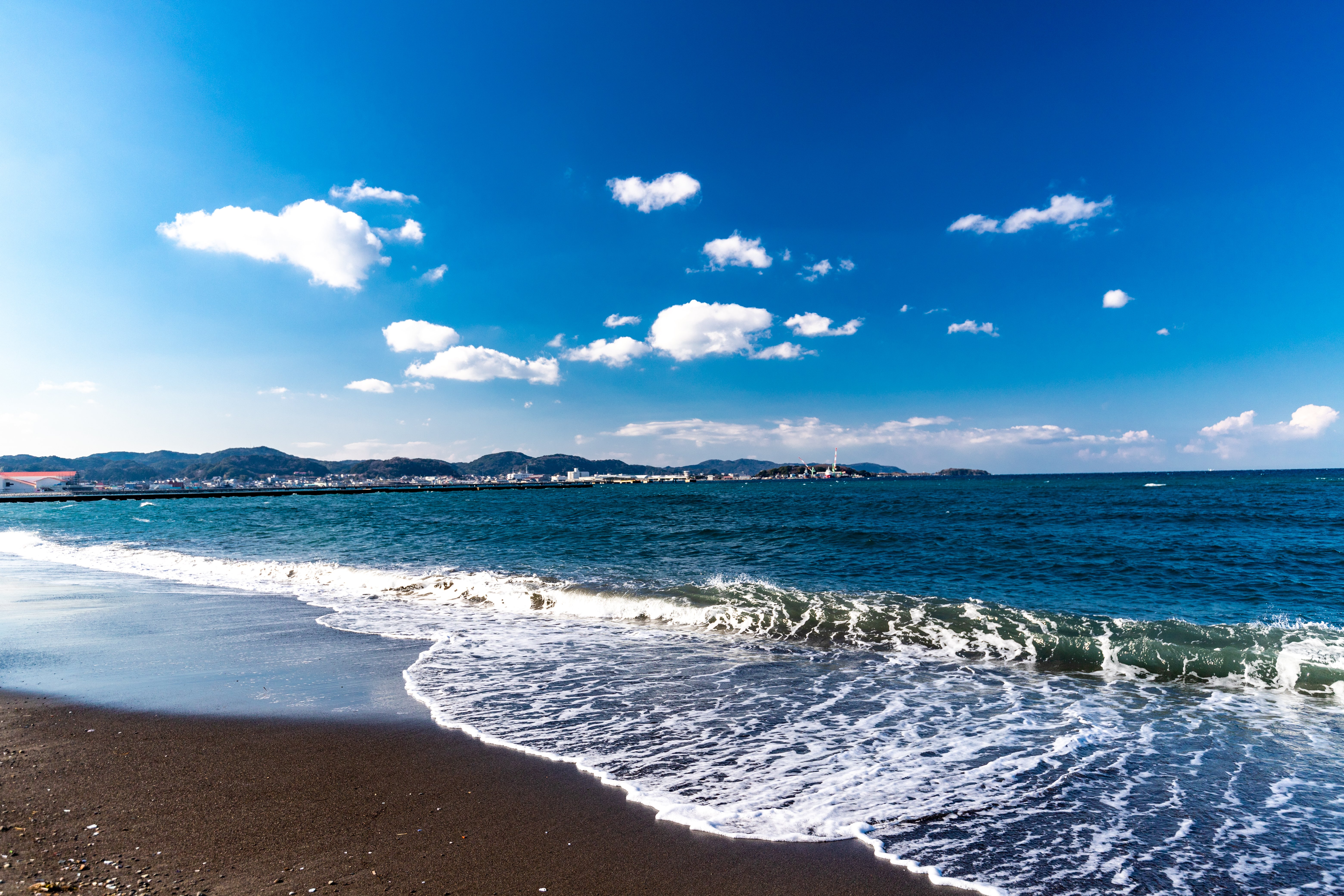
Hojo beach at Tateyama

Filming started taking place in October 2023. The filming location was in the town of Tateyama, Chiba. The first season premiered on Netflix on July 9, 2024.

In December 2024, Netflix announced that the show had been renewed for a second season, with a new cast of queer men and all of the commentators returning. Set in Hokkaido, the second season premiered on January 13, 2026.

== Soundtrack ==
The track "Dazed and Confused" from Bleach by the Korean indie band Glen Check is featured as the show's theme song. A second track by Glen Check, "4ever", is used as a leitmotif, or recurring refrain, to highlight key moments in the series when two cast members progress their relationship, or when an individual shows emotional growth. The "Golden Hour" (Fujii Kaze remix) by Jvke and Fujii Kaze also features in some episodes.

In 2026, Glen Check released the single "Bloom" through Netflix Music, in conjunction with Season 2. The track plays a role similar to "4ever" on the first season, with several recurring snippets playing during moments of dramatic tension, unexpected revelation, or relationship development.

== Accolades ==
=== Listicles ===
Year-end lists for The Boyfriend
Critic/Publication	List	Rank	Ref.
Teen Vogue	13 Best BL Dramas of 2024	Included	

== See also ==
- Sexual minorities in Japan
- List of Netflix original programming#Reality
- Terrace House
