= Chankapāna =

- CD-only cover

Single by NEWS
- Released: July 18, 2012
- Recorded: 2012
- Genre: Dance-pop
- Length: 4:25
- Label: Johnny & Associates
- Songwriters: Hacchin' Maya, her0ism

NEWS singles chronology
"Fighting Man" (2010)	"Chankapāna" (2012)	"World Quest/Pokopon Pekōrya" (2012)

"Chankapāna" (チャンカパーナ; lit. "My Dear Woman") is a song by Japanese music group NEWS. It is their 14th single and their first since the departure of Tomohisa Yamashita and Ryo Nishikido from the group. Written by Hacchin' Maya and her0ism, the single was released in Japan on July 18, 2012, under Johnny & Associates in six editions: a CD-only edition, limited editions N, E, W, and S, and a limited box set edition. "Chankapāna" debuted at number one on the weekly Oricon singles chart. The single has charted for three weeks and has sold over 272,000 copies in Japan. It was certified platinum by the Recording Industry Association of Japan (RIAJ).

== Background ==
On April 13, 2012, Johnny & Associates added a timer to their official website, which counted down to the date April 15. When the timer reached the number four on the minute and second dials, the color of the number would alternate, in order, from purple, green, yellow, and pink. When the timer reached zero, a silhouette of four individuals appeared on the website. This led to speculation regarding the return of NEWS.

On June 8, 2012, it was announced that NEWS would be releasing "Chankapāna" on July 18. The title of the song, which describes the love between a man and a woman, was compared to an exotic name of a woman. "Chankapāna" was labeled as a dance-pop song, which was accompanied with a catchy hook. "Chankapāna" is the first single released since the departure of Tomohisa Yamashita and Ryo Nishikido from the group.

== Composition ==
"Chankapāna" was written by Hacchin' Maya, composed by her0ism, and arranged by Chokkaku. "Full Swing" was written and composed by Heroism, and arranged by Seiji Kameda; "Starry" was written by Keiichiro Koyama, composed by Heroism, and arranged by Naoki Otsubo. "Vampire wa Kakukatariki" was written by Shigeaki Kato, and composed and arranged by Ryosuke Nakanishi. "PeekaBoo..." was written by Ryohei, composed by Chris Meyer, and arranged by Junji Chiba. "Addict" was written and composed by Yuya Tegoshi, and arranged by Masaya Suzuki.

== Release and promotion ==
"Chankapāna" was released on July 18, 2012, in six editions: a CD-only edition, which includes "Full Swing"; limited editions N, E, W, and S, which include Keiichiro Koyama's solo "Starry", Shigeaki Kato's solo "Vampire wa Kakukatariki" and the long version music video "Chankapāna" and the music video making, Takahisa Masuda's solo "PeekaBoo...", and Yuya Tegoshi's solo "Addict", respectively; a limited box set edition which includes all four solo songs by the members. NEWS performed "Chankapāna" on TV Asahi's Music Station on July 27, 2012.

== Chart performance ==
"Chankapāna" debuted at number one on the weekly Oricon singles charts, selling 244,710 copies in its first week. It was the first time in three years that the group sold over 200,000 copies of a single since the release of "Koi no ABO" in 2009. It has charted for three weeks and was certified platinum by the RIAJ for shipping 250,000 copies, and has sold over 272,000 copies in Japan.^{a} On the issue dated July 23, 2012, the song debuted at number 90 on the Billboard Japan Hot 100. The following week, the song topped the chart.

== Track listing ==
CD-only
No.	Title	Lyrics	Music	Length
1.	"Chankapāna (チャンカパーナ; My Dear Woman)"	Hacchin' Maya	her0ism	4:25
2.	"Full Swing (フルスイング)"	her0ism	her0ism	4:30
3.	"Chankapāna (チャンカパーナ; My Dear Woman)" (Instrumental)		her0ism	4:25
4.	"Full Swing (フルスイング)" (Instrumental)		her0ism	4:30
Total length:				17:50

Limited edition N
No.	Title	Lyrics	Music	Length
1.	"Chankapāna (チャンカパーナ; My Dear Woman)"	Hacchin' Maya	her0ism	4:25
2.	"Starry" (Keiichiro Koyama solo)	Koyama	her0ism	4:45
3.	"Starry" (Instrumental)		her0ism	4:45
Total length:				13:55

Limited edition E
No.	Title	Lyrics	Music	Length
1.	"Chankapāna (チャンカパーナ; My Dear Woman)"	Hacchin' Maya	her0ism	4:25
2.	"Vampire wa Kakukatariki (ヴァンパイアはかく語りき)" (Shigeaki Kato solo)	Kato	Ryosuke Nakanishi	4:38
3.	"Vampire wa Kakukatariki (ヴァンパイアはかく語りき)" (Instrumental)		Nakanishi	4:38
4.	"Chankapāna (チャンカパーナ; My Dear Woman)" (music video and music video making)
Total length:				13:41

Limited edition W
No.	Title	Lyrics	Music	Length
1.	"Chankapāna (チャンカパーナ; My Dear Woman)"	Hacchin' Maya	her0ism	4:25
2.	"PeekaBoo..." (Takahisa Masuda solo)	Ryohei	Chris Meyer	3:58
3.	"PeekaBoo..." (Instrumental)		Meyer	3:58
Total length:				12:21

Limited edition S
No.	Title	Lyrics	Music	Length
1.	"Chankapāna (チャンカパーナ; My Dear Woman)"	Hacchin' Maya	her0ism	4:25
2.	"Addict" (Yuya Tegoshi solo)	Tegoshi	Tegoshi	4:36
3.	"Addict" (Instrumental)		Tegoshi	4:36
Total length:				13:37

Limited box set edition
No.	Title	Lyrics	Music	Length
1.	"Chankapāna (チャンカパーナ; My Dear Woman)"	Hacchin' Maya	her0ism	4:25
2.	"Starry" (Keiichiro Koyama solo)	Koyama	her0ism	4:45
3.	"Starry" (Instrumental)		her0ism	4:45
4.	"Vampire wa Kakukatariki (ヴァンパイアはかく語りき)" (Shigeaki Kato solo)	Kato	Ryosuke Nakanishi	4:38
5.	"Vampire wa Kakukatariki (ヴァンパイアはかく語りき)" (Instrumental)		Nakanishi	4:38
6.	"PeekaBoo..." (Takahisa Masuda solo)	Ryohei	Meyer	3:58
7.	"PeekaBoo..." (Instrumental)		Meyer	3:58
8.	"Addict" (Yuya Tegoshi solo)	Tegoshi	Tegoshi	4:36
9.	"Addict" (Instrumental)		Tegoshi	4:36
Total length:				40:19

== Chart history ==
Chart (2012)	Peak position
Billboard Japan Hot 100	1
Oricon Weekly Chart	1

== Notes ==
- ^Note a: The sales figure of 272,000 copies is taken from accumulating the sales of the single during its first six charting weeks on the Oricon weekly chart (244,710, 20,147, 7,549).
