= Dreams Come True (Hey! Say! JUMP song) =

Single by Hey! Say! JUMP

from the album JUMP No. 1
- Released: May 21, 2008 (Japan)
- Recorded: 2008
- Genre: J-pop
- Label: J Storm, Johnny & Associates
- Songwriters: Yoji Kubota, Koji Makaino, Chokkaku

Hey! Say! JUMP singles chronology
"Ultra Music Power" (2008)	"Dreams Come True" (2008)	"Your Seed/Bōken Rider" (2008)

Limited Edition Cover

"Dreams Come True" is a Hey! Say! JUMP single. It peaked at No. 1 on the weekly Oricon chart and sold 249,024 copies in total. The single ranked No. 25 on the yearly Oricon chart for 2008.

== Track listing ==
=== Regular edition ===
CD

1. "Dreams Come True"
2. "Oretachi no Seishun" - Yuya Takaki
3. "Chance to Change"
4. "Dreams Come True" (Original Karaoke)
5. "Oretachi no Seishun" (Original Karaoke) - Yuya Takaki
6. "Chance to Change" (Original Karaoke)

=== Limited edition ===
CD

1. "Dreams Come True"

DVD

1. "Dreams Come True" (PV & Making of)

== Chart ==
Chart (2008)	Peak position
Oricon Weekly Chart	1

Total reported sales: 249,024
