= Hiroki Uchi =

Japanese singer (born 1985)

Hiroki Uchi 内 博貴
- Born: September 10, 1986 (age 40)
- Origin: Habikino, Osaka, Japan
- Genres: Pop
- Occupations: Actor, singer-songwriter, model
- Years active: 1999–present
- Formerly of: Kanjani Eight, NEWS

Hiroki Uchi (内 博貴, Uchi Hiroki) (born September 10, 1986) is a Japanese actor, idol singer, songwriter, and model. He was born in Habikino, Osaka Prefecture, Japan.

== Career ==
In May 1999, Uchi participated in auditions for Johnny & Associates at the age of twelve. He had no interest in the entertainment industry and initially dreamed of becoming a professional baseball player, but was signed up to said audition by his mother. Uchi became the vocalist of the junior's group V. West when starred in Weekly V. West with other members of the group. Three years later, in December 2002, he became a member of Kanjani8.

Around the same time, Uchi started filming his first drama, Doremisora. In 2003, he and nother Kanjani8 member, Ryo Nishikido, were asked to join NEWS along with seven other members. The same year, Uchi took part in Boku no Ikiru Michi and was awarded the Best Newcomer by Nikkan Sports Drama Grand Prix.

=== Debut with NEWS ===
Uchi joined both NEWS and Kanjani8 in 2004. While performing in the show Hey! Say! Dream Boy shows (along with KAT-TUN), he was diagnosed with and hospitalized for pulmonary pneumothorax, a condition which causes holes to form in the lining of the lungs. Uchi was pulled from both shows for the urgent surgery to repair the three holes in his left lung. After rehabilitation, he returned in June for the release of the single "Teppen" by NEWS as well as filming the drama Ganbatte Ikimasshoi!. In July 2005, Uchi was temporarily suspended from all activities.

In early January 2008, Uchi graduated from trainee to solo status with a leading role in the Fuji TV drama special Isshun no Kaze ni Nare, which aired for the last four days of February. His status became a "junior" again. In March, he also joined the cast of NTV drama Osen for one of the leading roles. In November, it was announced he would start his solo concerts in Yokohama and Osaka in collaboration with Question?.

In 2009, Uchi took part in Playzone 2009 Letters from the Sun with Kis-My-Ft2. The same year, he starred in the animated series Yamato Nadeshiko Shichi Henge with Kazuya Kamenashi and Yuya Tegoshi, which was awarded Nikkan Sports Drama Grand Prix as the best drama.

Uchi was involved with the Japanese production of Broadway musical Guys and Dolls in 2010, to which the president of Johnny & Associates, Johnny Kitagawa, stated that Uchi has been permanently removed from both Kanjani8 and NEWS and instead focused on solo work and acting. Since then, Uchi has participated in many Japanese stage shows in both an acting and producing role. He played a supporting role in Endless Shock from 2010 to 2019, as well as leading role in a musical adaptation of The Great Gatsby. In 2019, he played the deutagonist role in Fortinbras, which is based on a supporting character from "Hamlet".
