= Worldista =

Studio album by NEWS
- Released: February 20, 2019
- Genre: J-pop
- Label: Johnny's

NEWS chronology
Epcotia (2018)	Worldista (2019)	Story (2020)

Singles from Worldista
- 1. "Blue" Released: June 27, 2018; 2. "Ikiro" Released: September 12, 2018

Worldista (stylized in all caps) is the 10th studio album by Japanese boy band NEWS. It was released on February 20, 2019, through Johnny's Entertainment, and is the third in the series of albums named after the initials of the band's name, following Neverland and Epcotia. It was preceded by the singles "Blue" and "Ikiro", both released in 2018, and debuted at number one on the Oricon Albums Chart, selling over 108,000 copies in its first week. The band toured Japan in support of the album in 2019.

== Background ==
The album's central concept is that of a virtual world called "Worldista" that the four members are transported to, where people can interact with others from all around the world using the Internet.

== Release ==
The album was released in two versions; the regular edition, which features four bonus tracks in the form of a solo song from each member, and a limited edition including a DVD with a 20-minute behind-the-scenes feature on the making of the album.

== Promotion ==
In addition to the two singles "Blue" and "Ikiro", the song "Spirit" was previously used as the theme song for Nippon Television's coverage of the 2018 FIFA Club World Cup, held in the United Arab Emirates.

== Track listing ==
No.	Title	Length
1.	"Log-in Sequence -Inter-" (ログインシークエンス -INTER-)
2.	"Worldista"
3.	"Orientation -Inter-" (オリエンテーション -INTER-)
4.	"Dead End"
5.	"Casino Drive"
6.	"Invisible Dungeon" (インビジブル ダンジョン)
7.	"Daiichi Check Point - Inter-" (第一チェックポイント -INTER-; First Check Point -INTER-)
8.	"Spirit"
9.	"Blue"
10.	"Fighters.com"
11.	"Happyōkai -Inter-" (発表会 -INTER-; Recital -INTER-)
12.	"Digital Love"
13.	"Ribbon" (リボン)
14.	"Quiz -Inter-" (クイズ -INTER-)
15.	"Santa no Inai Christmas" (サンタのいないクリスマス; Christmas without Santa)
16.	"Strawberry"
17.	"Ikiro" (生きろ; Live)
18.	"Ending -Inter-" (エンディング -INTER-)
19.	"Symphony of Dissonance" (Takahisa Masuda solo) (regular edition only)
20.	"DoLLs" (Yuya Tegoshi solo) (regular edition only)
21.	"Going That Way" (Keiichiro Koyama solo) (regular edition only)
22.	"Sekai" (世界; World) (Shigeaki Kato solo) (regular edition only))

Limited edition DVD
No.	Title	Length
1.	"Worldista Ver.10 & Making"	20:00

== Charts ==
=== Weekly charts ===
Chart (2019)	Peak position
Japanese Albums (Oricon)	1
Japanese Hot Albums (Billboard Japan)	1

=== Year-end charts ===
Chart (2019)	Position
Japanese Albums (Oricon)	35

== See also ==
- List of Oricon number-one albums of 2019
