= Your Seed / Bōken Rider =

"Your Seed/Bōken Rider"

Single by Hey! Say! JUMP

from the album JUMP No. 1
- B-side: "Bōken Rider"
- Released: (Japan) July 23, 2008
- Recorded: 2008
- Genre: J-pop
- Label: J Storm, Johnny & Associates

Hey! Say! JUMP singles chronology
"Dreams Come True" (2008)	"Your Seed/Bōken Rider" (2008)	"Mayonaka no Shadow Boy" (2008)

"Your Seed/Bōken Rider" is a Hey! Say! JUMP single. The single was released on July 23, 2008. It peaked at #1 on the weekly Oricon charts and sold 208,113 copies in total.

The single played in the Japanese version of Kung Fu Panda.

== Regular Edition ==
CD

1. "Your Seed"
2. "Bōken Rider"
3. "Your Seed" (Original Karaoke)
4. "Bōken Rider" (Original Karaoke)

== Limited Edition ==
CD

1. "Your Seed"
2. "Bōken Rider"

DVD

1. "Your Seed" (PV & Making of)

== Charts and certifications ==
=== Charts ===
Chart (2008)	Peak position
Japan Oricon Weekly Singles Chart	1
Japan Oricon Monthly Singles Chart	4
Japan Oricon Yearly Singles Chart	31

=== Sales and certifications ===
Country	Provider	Sales	Certification
Japan	RIAJ	208,113	Gold
