= Takahisa Masuda =

Japanese entertainer

Takahisa Masuda 増田 貴久
- Also known as: Massu
- Born: 4 July 1986 (age 40); Tokyo, Japan
- Genre: J-pop
- Occupations: Singer; actor
- Instrument: Vocals
- Years active: 1998–present
- Label: ELOV-Label
- Member of: NEWS
- Formerly of: Tegomass
- Website: NEWS Starto Entertainment website

Takahisa Masuda (増田 貴久, Masuda Takahisa; born 4 July 1986) is a Japanese singer, actor and entertainer under Starto Entertainment, member of NEWS. From ELOV-Label records, formerly known as Johnny's Entertainment.

== Biography ==
Masuda joined Johnny's Entertainment in November 1998. During his junior days, Masuda backdanced for many of his seniors in the agency, such as KAT-TUN, and participated in many Johnny's junior photoshoots. In 2001, he was cast as a junior high school student in the sixth season of the popular Japanese drama 3-nen B-gumi Kinpachi Sensei. In 2003, he landed the starring role in the drama special Musashi. He also performed with the junior group Kis-My-Ft. as the 'M' after Matsumoto Kohei's departure.

In late 2003, Masuda became a member of the J-pop group NEWS to promote the Women's World Cup of Volleyball Championships. When NEWS went on hiatus in 2006, he and fellow NEWS member Tegoshi Yuya formed the singing group Tegomass. The duo released the single "Miso Soup" in both Sweden and Japan. Masuda was allowed to further his acting experience in 2006 by landing various supporting roles in many Japanese dramas.

In late 2008, Masuda and the promoters of TU→YU formed a singing group to release the song "Soba Ni Iru Yo", which was featured in the product's commercials and released through the Japanese mobile phone network.

Masuda landed a role in the drama Rescue, which aired in January 2009.

In November 2009, Masuda acted in the stage play Ame no Hi no Mori no Naka (Inside a Rainy Day's Forest), with his first stage play leading role.

Masuda starred in the leading role for the drama Rental Nanmoshinai Hito that began airing in April 2020.

In June 2020, the duo Tegomass broke up when Tegoshi left Johnny's Entertainment. Masuda is still active in the group NEWS.

Masuda releases his first solo album on 12 February 2025. "Kido Airaku" features a total of eight tracks including the lead song "Kidoairaku". Available in three types: Limited Edition A, Limited Edition B, and Regular Edition. A follow-up tour, "Masuda Takahisa 1st Live Kidoairaku", takes place on 18 February in Osaka, and 25 and 26 February in Tokyo.

In 2025 Masuda starred as Kibitsuhiko in the storytelling ice show Hyoen – Mirror-Patterned Demon, alongside Olympic bronze medallist and former world figure skating champion, Daisuke Takahashi. The show was directed by film director Yukihiko Tsutsumi and based on the Legend of Ura, which is widely regarded a pre-curser to the popular Japanese folk tale of Momotarō.

== Discography ==
=== Solo album ===
- Kidoairaku (2025) (Limited edition A CD+Blu-Ray/DVD, Limited edition B 2 CD+Blu-Ray/DVD, Regular edition CD)
- COVER OF TAKAHISA MASUDA (2026) (Limited edition A CD+Blu-Ray/DVD, Limited edition B CD+Blu-Ray/DVD, Regular edition CD, Family Club store online exclusive edition CD+Goods)

=== Solo songs ===
Year	Title	Details
2012	暁-AKATSUKI-	Featured in album NEWS BEST
2012	Pumpkin	Featured in album NEWS BEST
2012	SUPERMAN	Featured in album NEWS BEST
2012	Peekaboo...	Featured in single Chankapana
2013	Remedy	Featured in album NEWS
2015	Skye Beautiful	Featured in album White
2016	LIS'N	Featured in album QUARTETTO
2017	FOVEVER MINE	Featured in album NEVERLAND
2018	Thunder	Featured in album EPCOTIA
2019	Symphony of Dissonance	Featured in album WORLDISTA
2020	Zutto Issho sa (ずっと一緒さ)	Featured in NEWS DOME TOUR 2018-2019 EPCOTIA -ENCORE- DVD
2020	Koi (戀)	Featured in album STORY
2022	XXX	Featured in album Ongaku
2023	hanami	Featured in album NEWS EXPO
2024	kawaii	Featured in album JAPANEWS
2025	TM	Featured in album Henshin
2026	Lost in the rain...	Featured in album KMK

== Filmography ==
=== Variety shows ===
- Ya-Ya-Yah (2003–2007)
- Soukon (2009–2010)
- Ippuku! (2014–2015)
- Mirai Rocket (2014–2015)
- Hen Lab (2015–2016)
- Cho Hamaru! Bakusho Chara Paredo (2016–2017)
- Shounen Club Premium (2016–2019)
- Netapare (2017–present)
- PON (2018)
- Gurunai (2020–present)

=== Drama ===
- Scary Sunday ~2000~ (2000)
- 3-nen B-gumi Kinpachi-sensei (2001–2002, 2011)
- Musashi (2003)
- Gekidan Engimono (2005)
- Gachi Baka! (2006)
- Dance Drill (2006)
- Rescue (2009)
- Resident 5-nin no Kenshui (2012)
- Zero: The Bravest Money Game (2018)
- Voice: 110 Emergency Control Room (2019)
- Pareto No Gosan (2020)
- Rental Nanmoshinai Hito (2020)
- Komi Can't Communicate (2021–2022)
- Kichijoji Losers (2022)
- Old Rookie (2022)
- Yugure Ni Te O Tsunagu (2023)
- Iyana Iyana Iyana Yatsu (2023)
- Gifted (2023)
- Oshi no Tatsujin (2025)

=== Film ===
- Bayside Shakedown: N.E.W (2026), Yuki Mashita

=== Stage ===
- MachiMasu (2007)
- Ame no Hi no Mori no Naka (2009)
- Hai iro no Kanaria (2012)
- Strange Fruits (2013)
- Only You-Bokura No Romeo&Juliet (2018)
- How To Succeed in Business Without Really Trying (2020)
- On the Twentieth Century (2024)
- Aladdin (2025)
- Holiday Inn (2025)
- Hyoen 2025 -Mirror Patterned Demon- (2025)

== Other ==
=== Book ===
- MASU Styling log (2024)

=== Radio ===
- Master Hits (2005–present, Sundays weekly from 10:30pm~10:57pm, Bay FM)
- Tegomasu no Radio (2011–2020, MBS Radio)
- Masumasu Radio (2020–2021, MBS Radio)
- Masumaru Radio (2021–October 30, 2025, Wednesdays weekly from 1:00am~1:30am, MBS Radio)
- Takahisa Masuda Super Omoshiro Radio (November 16, 2025–present, Wednesdays weekly from 1:00am~1:30am, MBS Radio)

=== Commercials ===
- Tu-Yu
