= Takasugi-san's Obento =

Japanese manga series

- First tankōbon volume cover

高杉さん家のおべんとう (Takasugi-san Chi no Obentō)
- Genre: Cooking; Romantic comedy; Slice of life
- Manga
- Written by: Nozomi Yanahara
- Published by: Media Factory
- English publisher: NA: Digital Manga
- Magazine: Monthly Comic Flapper
- Original run: April 4, 2009 – May 2, 2015
- Volumes: 10
- Television drama
- Directed by: Takashi Ninomiya; Ryō Sato
- Written by: Yūko Kawabe
- Music by: Yasuyoshi Suzuki
- Studio: Chukyo TV
- Original network: NNS (Chukyo TV, Nippon TV)
- Original run: October 3, 2024 – December 5, 2024
- Episodes: 10
- icon

Takasugi-san's Obento (Japanese: 高杉さん家のおべんとう, Hepburn: Takasugi-san Chi no Obentō), also known as Takasugi-san Family's Obento, is a Japanese manga series written and illustrated by Nozomi Yanahara. It was serialized in Media Factory's seinen manga magazine Monthly Comic Flapper from April 2009 to May 2015, with its chapters collected in ten tankōbon volumes. A ten-episode television drama adaptation was broadcast on Chukyo TV, Nippon Television and other NNS stations from October to December 2024.

== Media ==
=== Manga ===
Written and illustrated by Nozomi Yanahara, Takasugi-san's Obento was serialized in Media Factory's seinen manga magazine Monthly Comic Flapper from April 4, 2009, to May 2, 2015. Media Factory collected its chapters in ten tankōbon volumes, released from January 23, 2010, to July 23, 2015.

In North America, the manga was published by Digital Manga. The company only released the first two volumes on November 27, 2013, and May 28, 2014, respectively. Kadokawa added the series to its ComicWalker online platform in 2014, only publishing the first two volumes as well.

=== Drama ===
In September 2024, it was announced that the series would receive a television drama adaptation. It was broadcast from October 3 to December 5, 2024, on Chukyo TV's Wednesday Platinum Night programming block.
