= Happy Birthday (NEWS song) =

Single by NEWS

from the album Color
- B-side: Gan Gan Ganbatte; Push On!; Game of Love
- Released: October 1, 2008
- Recorded: 2008
- Genre: J-Pop
- Length: 18:53
- Label: Johnny's Entertainment
- Songwriter(s): SEAMO

NEWS singles chronology
"Summer Time" (2008)	"Happy Birthday" (2008)	"Koi no ABO" (2009)

Alternative Covers

"Happy Birthday" is the tenth single of the Japanese boy group NEWS. It was released on October 1, 2008, in two editions; a regular edition which contains two b-sides: Gan Gan Ganbatte and Push On!, and a limited edition which also contains Happy Birthday and its b-side Gan Gan Ganbatte from the regular edition, as well as another b-side entitled Game of Love and an instrumental version of Happy Birthday. Happy Birthday is NEWS tenth consecutive number-one single since their debut in 2004. This single makes them the second group to have this distinction (the other being KinKi Kids, who currently has twenty-seven consecutive number-one singles).

== Overview ==
Happy Birthday was written and composed by Japanese Hip-hop artist SEAMO. Happy Birthday reached the number-one spot on both the daily and weekly Oricon charts, selling 201,304 copies in its first week; just 38 more copies than their previous single Summer Time, which sold 201,266 copies in its first week.

== Promotion ==
Happy Birthday is the theme song for Kosé's Happy Bath Day Precious Rose commercial, which features all six-members.

=== TV performance ===
- September 24, 2008 - CDTV 15th Anniversary
- September 29, 2008 - Hey! Hey! Hey! Music Champ
- October 3, 2008 - Music Station

== Track list ==
Regular Edition
No.	Title	Length
1.	"Happy Birthday"	3:49
2.	"Gan Gan Ganbatte (written by zopp)"	3:54
3.	"Push On! (written by Aya Hawerukazu)"	3:07

Limited Edition
No.	Title	Length
3.	"Game of Love (written by Yu Shimoji/rap by JACRREN)"	4:17
4.	"Happy Birthday (Instrumental)"	3:48

== Charts ==
=== Oricon chart ===
Release	Chart	Peak position	First week sales	Sales total
October 1, 2008	Oricon Daily Singles Chart	1		
October 1, 2008	Oricon Weekly Singles Chart	1	201,304	
October 1, 2008	Oricon Monthly Singles Chart	2		227,644
October 1, 2008	Oricon Yearly Singles Chart	26		

=== Billboard Japan chart ===
Release	Chart	Peak position
October 1, 2008	Billboard Japan Hot 100	1
