= Live (NEWS album) =

Studio album by NEWS
- Released: September 15, 2010
- Recorded: 2010
- Genre: J-pop
- Label: Johnny's Entertainment
- Producer: Johnny H. Kitagawa Executive producer

NEWS chronology
Color (2008)	Live (2010)	NEWS Best (2012)

Singles from Live
- 1. "Koi no ABO" Released: April 29, 2009; 2. "Sakura Girl" Released: March 31, 2010

Professional ratings
Review scores
Source	Rating
AllMusic	2.5/5 stars

Live is the fourth studio album released by the Japanese boy group NEWS. The album is certified gold for a shipment of 100,000 copies and even top the Oricon chart.

== Album information ==
Despite its members expanding to solo projects and other musical units in the past year, popular Johnny's pop group NEWS continues going strong as a unit as well. After a long 22 months' wait, they finally unleash their latest full-length album. Live is NEWS' fourth album, and it features their hit singles "Koi no ABO" and "Sakura Girl". The album will also mark the first release of "Be Funky", the theme song to the TV drama Troubleman, starring member Kato Shigeaki. In addition to the group's usual musical collaborator zopp, GreeeeN's usual producer Jin also joins the fun with the album's title track Live.

First Press Edition comes with the group's Unplugged live concert and its making of on a bonus DVD.

== Track listing ==
Regular Edition CD
No.	Title	Length
1.	"Koi no ABO" (恋のABO)	4:41
2.	"LIVE"	4:53
3.	"Umareshi Kimi e" (生まれし君へ)	3:59
4.	"Supernatural"	4:23
5.	"Aki no Sora" (秋の空)	4:17
6.	"Futari/130000000 no Kiseki" (2人/130000000の奇跡)	4:33
7.	"Dancin' in the Secret"	3:46
8.	"Wonderland" (ワンダーランド)	4:22
9.	"Sakura Girl" (さくらガール)	4:50
10.	"BE FUNKY!"	3:47
11.	"D.T.F"	4:24
12.	"Naiyou no Nai Tegami" (内容の無い手紙)	4:15
13.	"Endless Summer" (エンドレス・サマー)	4:15
14.	"Share"	4:31
15.	"Forever（Unplugged Ver.）"	4:24
Total length:		1:05:20

Limited Edition CD
No.	Title	Length
1.	"Koi no ABO" (恋のABO)	4:41
2.	"LIVE"	4:53
3.	"Umareshi Kimi e" (生まれし君へ)	3:59
4.	"Supernatural"	4:23
5.	"Aki no Sora" (秋の空)	4:17
6.	"Futari/130000000 no Kiseki" (2人/130000000の奇跡)	4:33
7.	"Dancin' in the Secret"	3:46
8.	"Wonderland" (ワンダーランド)	4:22
9.	"Sakura Girl" (さくらガール)	4:50
10.	"BE FUNKY!"	3:47
11.	"D.T.F"	4:24
12.	"Naiyou no Nai Tegami" (内容の無い手紙)	4:15
13.	"Endless Summer" (エンドレス・サマー)	4:15
Total length:		56:25

Limited Edition DVD
No.	Title	Length
1.	"Unplugged LIVE"
2.	"Unplugged LIVE Making"

== Charts and certifications ==
=== Charts ===
Chart (2010)	Peak position	Sales
Japan Oricon Album Weekly Chart	1	156,391
Japan Oricon Album Yearly Chart	34	185,204

=== Sales and certifications ===
Country	Provider	Sales	Certification
Japan	RIAJ	185,204	Gold

== Release history ==
Country	Date	Format	Distributor
Japan	September 15, 2010	CD (JECN-0241); LE (JECN-0239~0240)	Johnny's Entertainment
Hong Kong	October 15, 2010	CD; LE	Avex Asia Limited
Philippines	May 5, 2012	CD; LE	Universal Records
