= Touch (NEWS album) =

Studio album by NEWS
- Released: April 27, 2005
- Genre: Japanese Pop
- Length: 56:13 (limited) 61:24 (regular)
- Label: Johnny & Associates

NEWS chronology
Touch (2005)	Pacific (2008)

Singles from touch
- 1. "NEWS NIPPON" Released: November 7, 2003; 2. "Kibou ~Yell~" Released: May 12, 2004; 3. "Akaku Moyuru Taiyou" Released: August 11, 2004; 4. "Cherish" Released: March 16, 2005

Touch is the first studio album by Japanese musical group NEWS, released on April 27, 2005. The album reached the number one position on the Oricon Daily Album Chart and Oricon Weekly Album Chart. Four singles have been released from this album.

== Tie-ups and theme songs ==
"Kibou ~Yell~" was used as the theme song for the 2004 Men's World Olympic Volleyball qualification tournaments for Japanese television broadcasting. "Kirameki no Kanata e" was used as the image song for the 36th Spring High School Volleyball tournament, as well as the Nivea "8x4 Powder Spray" commercial song. "Akaku Moyuru Taiyou" was used as the image song for the 2004 Japanese Fuji Television broadcast of the FIVB World Grand Prix. "Cherish" was used as the TBC "Good News" Campaign Song. "NEWS Nippon" was used as the 2003 Volleyball World Cup Japanese broadcast song.

== Track listing ==
Limited edition
No.	Title	Lyrics	Music	Length
1.	"Kibou ~Yell~"	Ide Kouji	Ide Kouji	4:35
2.	"Kirameki no Kanata e"	Sakai Mikio	Sakai Mikio	5:01
3.	"Akaku Moyuru Taiyou"	Satomi	Shusui, Stefan Engblom, Axel Belinder	4:31
4.	"I・ZA・NA・I・ZU・KI"	Kondo Natsuko	Joey Carbone, David Kater, Jay Condiotti	4:00
5.	"Love Song"	Yamashita Tomohisa	Yamashita Tomohisa	5:20
6.	"Zutto"	Kondo Natsuko	Ueno Kouji	4:10
7.	"High TEN!"	Kizuki Mihiro	Maejima Yasuaki	4:15
8.	"Koiyake"	Kizuki Mihiro	Shusui, Henric Uhrbom, Julius Bengtsson	2:59
9.	"Shissho! Friday Night"	Matsuki Taijirou	Matsuki Taijirou	2:25
10.	"Say Hello"	ARCHIBOLD, Atoji Makoto, 春和文	ARCHIBOLD	4:11
11.	"Cherish"	Fukushi Kentarou	Fukushi Kentarou	4:23
12.	"Yawarakana Mama de"	KNM PROJECT	Makaino Kouji	4:55
13.	"NEWS NIPPON"	KNM PROJECT	Makaino Yasuji	4:39
14.	"Yume no kazu dake ai ga umareru (A cappella version)"	zopp	Larry Forsberg, Sven-inge Sjoberg, Lennart Wastesson	1:35

Regular edition
No.	Title	Lyrics	Music	Length
15.	"Stand Up (rock version)"	Kurosu Chihiro	Richard Fairbrass, Christopher Fairbrass, Clyde Ward	3:49

Notes

- All of Takahiro Moriuchi's lines in "NEWS NIPPON" were re-recorded by other members of the group for the version on this album.

== DVD ==
A DVD came with the limited-edition version of the album. It contained a "PRIVATE MOVIE" section of the members pretending to go on dates with viewers, "CONCERT" section with a performance of "Yume no Kazu dake Ai ga Umareru" from the NEWSnowConcert, and a "MESSAGE" section with a brief message about the album from each member.
