= Shounen Club =

- Starring: Johnny's Jr.; Snow Man; SixTones; Naniwa Danshi; Travis Japan; Kansai Jr.

Production
- Running time: 59 minutes

Original release
- Network: NHK BS Premium
- Release: April 9, 2000 – October 27, 2023

Shounen Club (ザ少年倶楽部, Boys Club) was a Japanese music variety show that airs on NHK BS Premium. The show premiered on NHK BS 2 on April 9, 2000, and ended on October 27, 2023. Worldwide, it airs on NHK World Premium and TV Japan (US) as Pop Music Club

It features the juniors of Johnny & Associates. In addition to singing songs and participating in discussions, there is a segment that brings out the personality of the performers, such as quizzes.

On October 12, 2023, NHK announced that it would end broadcasting the Shounen Club program after 23 years on air in response to cases of sexual harassment committed by the agency's founder, Johnny Kitagawa. Instead, On November 15, a new program was announced entitled "New Gene!" which features the next generation of idols, artists and performers who dream of becoming future stars. Scheduled to be broadcast on January 19, 2024 on NHK BS Premium 4K and January 26 on NHK BS Premium.

== Cast ==
- Keiichiro Koyama (NEWS) (April 9, 2006 – March 24, 2011)
- Yuichi Nakamaru (KAT-TUN) (April 9, 2006 – March 24, 2011)
- Hey! Say! JUMP (April 8, 2011 – March 26, 2014)
- Fumito Kawai (A.B.C-Z) (April 2, 2014 – March 30, 2018)
- Akito Kiriyama (Johnny's WEST) (April 2, 2014 – March 30, 2018)

=== Regular appearance ===
- Snow Man
- SixTones
- Naniwa Danshi
- Travis Japan
- Johnny's Jr.
- Kansai Johnny's Jr.

== Shounen Club Premium ==
Shounen Club Premium
- Presented by: Taichi Kokubun (2006–2014); KAT-TUN (2014–2016); NEWS (2016–2019); Kis-My-Ft2 (2019–present)

Production
- Running time: 59 minutes

Original release
- Network: NHK BS Premium
- Release: April 23, 2006 – October 20, 2023

Shounen Club Premium (ザ少年倶楽部プレミアム) was a Japanese music variety show hosted by NEWS and broadcast on NHK BS Premium. The hour-long show premiered on April 23, 2006. This program ends on October 20, 2023, as "Shounen Club" stops broadcasting. On November 24, a new program entitled "Premise" aired with King & Prince appointed as hosts.

=== MC ===
- Taichi Kokubun (April 2006 – March 2014)
- KAT-TUN (April 2014 – March 2016)
- NEWS (April 2016 – March 2019)
- Kis-My-Ft2 (April 2019 – March 2023)
