= NEWS Best =

Greatest hits album by NEWS
- Released: June 13, 2012
- Genre: J-pop
- Length: 65:20 (Disc 1); 35:59 (Disc 2 First Press Edition); 67:06 (Disc 2 Regular Edition)
- Label: Johnny's Entertainment

NEWS chronology
Live (2010)	NEWS Best (2012)

Singles from NEWS Best
- 1. "Fighting Man" Released: November 3, 2010

NEWS Best is the first compilation album released by the Japanese boy group NEWS.

== Track List ==
CD 1: All singles Best
No.	Title	Length
1.	"NEWS Nippon" (NEWSニッポン)
2.	"Kibou ~Yell~" (希望〜Yell〜)
3.	"Akaku Moyuru Taiyou" (紅く燃ゆる太陽)
4.	"Cherish" (チェリッシュ)
5.	"TEPPEN"
6.	"Sayaendou" (サヤエンドウ)
7.	"Hadashi no Cinderella Boy" (裸足のシンデレラボーイ)
8.	"Hoshi wo Mezashite" (星をめざして)
9.	"weeeek"
10.	"Taiyou no Namida" (太陽のナミダ)
11.	"SUMMER TIME"
12.	"Happy Birthday"
13.	"Koi no ABO" (恋のABO)
14.	"Sakura Girl" (さくらガール)
15.	"Fighting Man"

CD 2: Fan Selection Best (Regular Edition)
No.	Title	Length
1.	"Endless Summer" (エンドレス・サマー)
2.	"Share"
3.	"I･ZA･NA･I･ZU･KI"
4.	"SNOW EXPRESS"
5.	"Dreams"
6.	"FLY AGAIN"
7.	"Smile Maker"
8.	"Forever"
9.	"Bambina" (バンビーナ)
10.	"Kirameki no Kanata e" (きらめきの彼方へ)
11.	"Yume no Kazu Dake Ai ga Umareru" (夢の数だけ愛が生まれる)
12.	"Ichiokusanzenmanbun no Futari no Kiseki" (2人/130000000の奇跡)
13.	"Mafuyuu no Nagareboshi" (真冬のナガレボシ)
14.	"Cherish" (チェリッシュ <Ryoji (from ケツメイシ) Remix>)
15.	"Towairo no Koi" (永遠色の恋)

CD 3: Unreleased Best (First Press Edition)
No.	Title	Length
1.	"Love Addiction"
2.	"Private Hearts"
3.	"Uri Sarang"
4.	"Akatsuki" (暁-AKATSUKI-)
5.	"Pumpkin"
6.	"SUPERMAN"
7.	"HAPPY MUSIC"
8.	"Kakao" (カカオ)
9.	"Shalala Tambourine" (シャララタンバリン)
10.	"Gomibako" (ごみ箱)
11.	"Stars"
12.	"Ai Nante" (愛なんて)
