= Durian Lollobrigida =

Japanese entertainer

- ドリアン・ロロブリジーダ
- Born: Masaki Ōtake (大竹正輝); 24 December 1984 (age 41); Tokyo, Japan
- Occupations: Actor; drag performer; singer; television host

Masaki Ōtake (Japanese: 大竹正輝, Hepburn: Ōtake Masaki; born 24 December 1984), known by the stage name Durian Lollobrigida (ドリアン・ロロブリジーダ, Dorian Roroburijīda), is a Japanese actor, drag performer, singer, and television host.

A native of Tokyo, Lollobrigida began dressing in drag in 2006. He appeared in Daishi Matsunaga's 2022 queer drama Egoist, and was a commentator on the Japanese television series The Boyfriend. He uses the pronouns he/him in and out of drag.

== Filmography ==
=== Television ===
- Shadows of the Ten Ninja (2026), Magamaru

== See also ==
- List of drag queens
