= Color (NEWS album) =

- Regular edition cover

Studio album by NEWS
- Released: November 19, 2008
- Recorded: 2007–2008
- Genres: J-pop; power pop
- Length: 58:20 (limited edition); 62:34 (regular edition)
- Label: Johnny's Entertainment
- Producer: Johnny H. Kitagawa

NEWS chronology
Pacific (2007)	Color (2008)	Live (2010)

Singles from Color
- 1. "Weeeek" Released: November 7, 2007; 2. "Taiyō no Namida" Released: February 27, 2008; 3. "Summer Time" Released: May 8, 2008; 4. "Happy Birthday" Released: October 1, 2008

Professional ratings
Review scores
Source	Rating
AllMusic	3/5 stars

Color is the third studio album by Japanese group NEWS, released on November 19, 2008. The album was released in a limited edition and regular edition. The regular edition comes with a bonus track. The album debuted at the number-one spot on the Oricon chart, making Color their third consecutive number-one album.

== Singles ==
- "Weeeek": On November 7, 2007, NEWS released "Weeeek", their seventh single, along with their second studio album, Pacific. Weeeek debuted on the top of the charts with a combined sale of 262,715, giving NEWS their seventh consecutive number-one single.

== Track listing ==
Limited edition
No.	Title	Lyrics	Music	Length
1.	"Weeeek"	Greeeen	Greeeen	3:48
2.	"Stardust"	Nami, Pa-non	Takuya Watanabe (渡辺 拓也)	4:12
3.	"Summer Time"	Zopp, Lowarth (rap)	Red-T	4:25
4.	"Snow Express"	Shizuka Izyūin (伊達歩), (rap) Tomohisa Yamashita	Tatsuro Yamashita (山下 達郎)	4:15
5.	"Forever"	Mihiro Kizuki (稀月 真皓), (rap) {{ヒロイズム}}	Youji Noi (野井 洋児)	4:33
6.	"Mola"	Daisuke "DI" Imai	Daisuke "DI" Imai	3:32
7.	"Kesenai (ケセナイ, Indelible)"	Azuki	Kentarō Hukushi (福士 健太郎)	5:55
8.	"Ordinary"	Ryo Nishikido	Ryo Nishikido	3:37
9.	"Minna ga Iru Sekai o Hitotsu ni Ai o Motto Give & Take Shimashō (みんながいる世界を一つに愛をもっとGive & Takeしましょう, Let’s make the world as one to give & take more love)"	Zopp	her0ism	4:20
10.	"Murarisuto (ムラリスト)"	Tomoya Kinoshita (木下 智哉)	Tomoya Kinoshita	4:00
11.	"Taiyō no Namida (太陽のナミダ, Tears of the Sun)"	Michio Kawano (カワノ ミチオ)	Michio Kawano	4:21
12.	"Smile Maker"	0 Soul 7	0 Soul 7	3:51
13.	"Happy Birthday"	Seamo	Seamo, Shintaro "Growth" Izutsu	3:48
14.	"Fly Again"	Azuki	her0ism	3:25

Regular edition
No.	Title	Lyrics	Music	Length
15.	"Towairo no Koi (永遠色の恋, Love with an Eternal Color)"	M-Takeshi	Stefan Aberg, Shusui	4:12

== Charts ==
Chart (2008)	Peak position
Oricon Weekly Albums Chart	1
Oricon Monthly Albums Chart	4
Oricon Yearly Albums Chart 2008	51
