= Yuya Tegoshi =

Japanese singer, actor, and TV personality(born 1987)

- 手越 祐也
- Born: November 11, 1987 (age 39); Yokohama, Kanagawa, Japan
- Occupations: Singer; actor; TV presenter
- Years active: 2002–present
- Musical career
- Genre: J-pop
- Instruments: Vocals, piano, guitar
- Labels: Johnny's Entertainment (2002-2020); For Life Music Entertainment (2021-present)
- Past members: NEWS; Tegomass
- Website: yuyategoshi.com

Yuya Tegoshi (手越 祐也, Tegoshi Yūya; born November 11, 1987) is a Japanese singer, actor, and television personality. He debuted as a member of Japanese boy band News under Johnny & Associates and was also part of its sub-group Tegomass.

== Career ==
=== 2002–2020: NEWS, Tegomass ===
Tegoshi entered Johnny & Associates during December 2002. He participated in various Johnny's Junior activities for eleven months before becoming a member of News in 2003.

Tegoshi appeared with his band members on Johnny's related television shows, such as Shounen Club and Ya-Ya-yah, soon after he entered the entertainment business. In 2005, Tegoshi landed the lead role in the movie Shisso, becoming the first member to star in a movie. Shisso aka Dead Run (International title) premiered in North America at the 2005 New Montreal FilmFest. He gained more acting roles in various Japanese dramas and continued his activities as a member of News. He also hosted his own radio show, called "Tegoshi Yuya's What a Wonderful Music" from April 2005 to March 2006.

During News's hiatus in 2006, he and bandmate Takahisa Masuda formed the duo Tegomass. They released the single "Miso Soup", recorded entirely in English, in Sweden that reached No. 12 on the Swedish charts. Tegoshi debuted in 2007 as a voice actor for the Japanese release of the American animated film Happy Feet as the voice of Mumble. In July 2007, Tegoshi was given the opportunity to perform a one-man-show called Tegoraji. Then he starred in Fuji TV's drama special called Shabake, as Ichitaro, based on the novel of the same name written by Megumi Hatakenaka (畠中 恵, Hatakenaka Megumi).

In 2008, Tegoshi reprised his role as Ichitaro, for the sequel of Shabake called Shabake: Uso Uso. At the end of 2008, director Hans Canosa cast Tegoshi as Mirai for the movie Memoirs of a Teenage Amnesiac, based on the novel of the same name by Gabrielle Zevin. This movie is slated to premiere March 27, 2010 in Japan.

In 2009, Tegoshi took part in the musical comedy Dream Boys 2009 alongside fellow Johnny & Associates members Kazuya Kamenashi and Subaru Shibutani at the Imperial Garden Theater in Marunouchi, Tokyo. This was his first time being featured as a major character in this annual stage show. Not only did Tegoshi appear in the stage play, he also acted in a special drama for FujiTV titled Dareka ga Uso wo Tsuiteiru. He played, Sato Takahiro, a host and the son of a salaryman accused of groping a high school girl on a train. Tegoshi also participated on the running-themed variety show called Sōkon with fellow News members, Keiichiro Koyama, Shigeaki Kato and Takahisa Masuda. The show was part of Lawson's green project campaign, where Lawson planted trees around Japan based on the number of points the members were awarded as they completed different running missions. At the end of 2009, it was announced that Tegoshi would take on the role of Toyama Yukinojo in the live-action drama adaption Yamato Nadeshiko Shichi Henge based on the manga of the same name. The drama aired January 15, 2010.

On October 15, Tegoshi was assigned to be the main commentator for Toyota Presents FIFA Club World Cup Japan 2012. He hosted a soccer sports show on NTV called "Soccer Earth" which used the News song "World Quest".

=== 2020–present: Solo career ===
On June 19, 2020, Tegoshi's contract with Johnny & Associates had been terminated. This followed events in April and May where Tegoshi was placed on suspension after attending drinking parties despite orders to stay home from the COVID-19 pandemic. Following his departure, Tegoshi held a press conference claiming that he left the company on good terms and that the tabloids had falsely reported a charity meeting as a drinking party. He announced plans to continue solo career activities including singing and that he had already intended to leave NEWS at the end of their Story concert tour.

On July 16, 2020, he announced that he had established his own company (Avalanche Co., Ltd.).

On August 5, 2020, Tegoshi released an autobiographical photo essay titled Avalanche, which discussed his career when he was contracted with Johnny & Associates.

On October 22, 2020, Tegoshi opened four hair removal salons Tegoshi Beauty Salon (Kagurazaka, Kawaguchi, Shinsaibashi [women only] and Kawagoe [men's only]).

==== Start of full-fledged solo artist activities ====
Tegoshi made his solo artist debut on July 7, 2021 with his first digital single "Cinnamon" and from there released songs for six consecutive months until December 2021.

In September 2021, he held a live tour 手越祐也 (Yuya Tegoshi) Live Tour 2021 Are You Ready? in Osaka, Nagoya, and Tokyo.

As the culmination of six consecutive months of music releases, his first full album New Frontier was released on December 22, 2021.

From January to April 2022, 手越祐也 (Yuya Tegoshi) Live Tour 2022 New Frontier, his first nationwide tour as a solo artist, was held with 14 concerts in seven cities.

On May 11 and 12, 2022, Tegoshi hosted his first music festival "Supepura Tegoshi Fes 2022" for two days at Pacifico Yokohama.

On July 7, 2022, the first anniversary of his solo debut, he released his 8th Digital Single "Over You (feat. マイキ (Maiki))".

On October 5, 2022, he released his first EP "Music Connect" and held his second nationwide tour "Yuya Tegoshi Live Tour 2022 Music Connect" from October 12 to November 30, 2022 with 12 concerts in 7 cities.

On December 1, the day after the final concert of the national tour, "Yuya Tegoshi 20th Anniversary Secret Live 2002-2022" was held in Tokyo to commemorate the 20th anniversary of his performing career.

On May 4, 2023, the first full orchestra concert "Yuya Tegoshi Symphonic Concert 2023" was held at the Tokyo Opera City Concert Hall.

In October 2024, Japanese rock star Yoshiki and NTV began the second season of "Yoshiki Superstar Project X", which opened with controversy due to NTV's handling of the addition of Tegoshi to the lineup of boy band XY.

== Discography ==
=== Studio albums ===
Title	Album details	Peak chart positions	Sales
Title	Album details	JPN	Sales
New Frontier	Released: December 22, 2021; Label: For Life Music Entertainment; Formats: CD, digital download; Track list: 1. "Are U Ready"; 2. "Hello!!"; 3. "Luv Me, Luv Me"; 4. "Venus Symphony"; 5. "Cinnamon" (シナモン); 6. "Nanairo Yell" (七色エール); 7. "One Life"; 8. "Snow White"; 9. "Wink" (ウインク); 10. "Honeyyy"; 11. "Love Sensation"; 12. "Mogake!" (モガケ！)	8	JPN: 11,553
Checkmate	Released: April 5, 2023; Label: For Life Music Entertainment; Formats: CD, digital download; Track list: 1. "Over You" (featuring マイキ(Maiki)); 2. "Just Right"; 3. "Maze World"; 4. "Lavaguera" (ラヴァゲラ); 5. "Hotel"; 6. "Peaceful for You"; 7. "Konote to Sonote" (この手とその手); 8. "Make Me Alive"; 9. "Comfort Zone"; 10. "Dracula" (ドラキュラ); 11. "Odore Odoreya Onogasono" (御どれ踊れや己が苑); 12. "Ready Steady"	4	JPN: 4,877
Super Star	Released: August 26, 2026; Label: For Life Music Entertainment; Formats: CD, digital download	25	JPN: 2,561

=== Compilation albums ===
Title	Album details	Peak chart positions	Sales
Title	Album details	JPN	Sales
Yuya Tegoshi Singles Best	Released: May 14, 2025; Label: For Life Music Entertainment; Formats: CD, digital download	10	JPN: 4,536

=== Extended plays ===
Title	EP details	Peak chart positions	Sales
Title	EP details	JPN	Sales
Music Connect	Released: October 5, 2022; Label: For Life Music Entertainment; Formats: CD, digital download; Track list: 1. "Ready Steady"; 2. "Cider" (サイダー); 3. "Happy Birthday"; 4. "Close Call"; 5. "Come Back to Me"; 6. "Wink" (MaikiP Remix ver.) (ウインク (マイキP Remix ver.))	9	JPN: 4,117
Kizuna (絆)	Released: January 24, 2024; Label: For Life Music Entertainment; Formats: CD, digital download	9	JPN: 4,989

=== Singles ===
Title	Year	Peak chart positions	Album
Title	Year	JPN Dig.	Album
"Cinnamon" (シナモン)	2021	26	New Frontier
"Are U Ready"	2021	26	New Frontier
"Luv Me, Luv Me"	2021	19	New Frontier
"Wink" (ウィンク)	2021	13	New Frontier
"One Life"	2021	18	New Frontier
"Mogake!" (モガケ！)	2021	24	New Frontier
"Maze World"	2022	21	Checkmate
"Over You" (feat. Maiki)	2022	11	Checkmate
"Hotel"	2022	24	Checkmate
"Comfort Zone"	2023	—	Checkmate

== Filmography ==
=== TV dramas ===
- Chosen Home (2025) as Saku Sakuta
- Zero: Ikkakusenkin Game (2018) as Kotaro Shiroyama
- Three Hundred Million yen Incident (2014) as Kenji Hamano
- Deka Wanko (2011) as Ryuuta Kirishima
- Yamato Nadeshiko Shichi Henge (2010) as Yukinojo Toyama
- Dareka ga Uso wo Tsuiteiru (2009) as Takahiro Sato
- Shabake: Uso Uso (2008) as Ichitaro
- Shabake Shabake (2007) as Ichitaro
- Hyoten 2006 (2006) as Toru Tsujiguchi
- My Boss My Hero (2006) as Jun Sakurakoji
- Gachibaka! (2006) as Minoru Utsugi
- Gekidan Engimono (2005) as Hiroaki Tomiyama
- 15 Sai no Blues (2005) as Kōhei Sanada

=== Films ===
- Hotaru no Hikari (2012)
- Dareka ga Watashi ni Kiss wo Shita (working titled Nakushita Kioku (ナクシタキオク)) (2010)
- Happy Feet (2007) (Japanese dubbing for Mumble) (Original voice done by: Elijah Wood)
- Dead Run (2005)

=== TV series ===
- Ya-Ya-yah (2003–2007)
- Sekai no Hate Made Itte Q (2007–2020)
- Sōkon (2009–2010)
- SOCCER EARTH as main caster for "Toyota Presents FIFA Club World Cup Japan 2012″
- Tegoshi Yuya's Journey to Soccer World SP (2012-12-08)
- Hen Lab (2015–2016)
- Shounen Club Premium (2016–2019)

=== Stage ===
- Dream Boys (2009)
- Tegoraji (2007)

=== CM ===
- House Foods: Tongari Corn (2005)
- House Foods: Vermont Curry (2006–2007)
- Calbee: Kappa Ebisen (2009)
- Nintendo: Pokémon Black/White (2009)
- Otsuka: Match (2011–)
- Ajinomoto: Knorr Cup Soup (2012–)
- Jobcan (2020–present)
- Rady (2020–present)
- Hotel Lovers (2021–present)
