= NEWS (band) =

Japanese boy band (2003-)

- Origin: Tokyo, Japan
- Genres: J-pop
- Years active: 2003–present
- Label: ELOV-Label (formerly Johnny's Entertainment)
- Spinoffs: Tegomass (2006–2020)
- Members: Keiichiro Koyama; Takahisa Masuda; Shigeaki Kato
- Past members: Ryo Nishikido; Tomohisa Yamashita; Takahiro Moriuchi; Hiroki Uchi; Hironori Kusano; Yuya Tegoshi
- Website: NEWS Starto Entertainment website

NEWS (acronym for "North East West South") is a Japanese boy band consisting of Keiichiro Koyama, Takahisa Masuda and Shigeaki Kato. Formed in 2003 by Johnny Kitagawa as a nine-member group under the label Johnny's Entertainment, NEWS released a promotional single "NEWS Nippon" (News ニッポン; News Japan), which was used for the World Cup of Volleyball Championships. In 2004, Takahiro Moriuchi (present-day Taka of One Ok Rock) left the group and the remaining eight members released their debut single, "Kibō: Yell" (希望 ~Yell~; Hope ~Yell~), which debuted atop the Oricon charts.

In 2006, the group released their fifth consecutive number-one single, "Sayaendō/Hadashi no Cinderella Boy" (サヤエンドウ/裸足のシンデレラボーイ, Sayaendō/Hadashi no Shinderera Bōi; Peas/Barefoot Cinderella Boy), as a six-member group due to the controversy surrounding then-members Hiroki Uchi and Hironori Kusano. After a brief hiatus, they released their seventh number-one single, "Hoshi o Mezashite" (星をめざして; lit. Aim for the Stars). In 2008, they performed at the Tokyo Dome for the first time, and released their tenth single, "Happy Birthday", which made NEWS the second Japanese group after label-mates KinKi Kids to have ten consecutive number-one singles since their debut. NEWS became a quartet following the departures of Ryo Nishikido and Tomohisa Yamashita from the group in 2011. NEWS became a trio following the departure of Yuya Tegoshi in 2020.

== History ==
=== 2003–2006: Debut and departure of members ===
Formed in September 2003, NEWS released a promotional single, "News Nippon" (News ニッポン, News Japan), which was used as the theme song for the World Cup of Volleyball Championships. Before holding their first concert, NEWSnow Concert: News' Concert (NEWSnowCONCERT〜ニュースのコンサート〜), Takahiro Moriuchi left the group. NEWS later released their debut single, "Kibō: Yell", which topped the Oricon chart. Their next two singles, "Akaku Moyuru Taiyō" (紅く燃ゆる太陽, Burning Red Sun) (2004) and Cherish (チェリッシュ, Cherisshu) (2005), both debuted atop the charts, as did NEWS' first album, Touch, which sold 164,016 copies in its first week.

In July 2005, Uchi Hiroki was caught for underage drinking and suspended indefinitely from both NEWS and Kanjani8, another group he was a part of. Despite having lost a member, NEWS released their fourth single, "Teppen" (てっぺん, Top), which like its predecessors debuted at number one. In January 2006, NEWS was reduced to six members when Hironori Kusano was suspended indefinitely for the same charge as Uchi. NEWS released their fifth single, "Sayaendō/Hadashi no Cinderella Boy" (サヤエンドウ/裸足のシンデレラボーイ, Peas/Barefoot Cinderella Boy) (March 2006), which was their fifth consecutive number-one single. On May 1, 2006, after NEWS finished their "NEWS Spring Tour", the group went on hiatus.

=== 2007–2010: NEWS' six-member years ===
On December 30, 2006, it was announced that NEWS would make their return at Johnny's Concert Countdown 2006-2007 as a six-member group, since Hiroki Uchi and Hironori Kusano had been demoted to trainees. To mark their return, NEWS embarked on a tour and released their sixth single "Hoshi wo Mezashite" (星をめざして, Aim For the Stars). "Hoshi wo Mezashite" became their sixth number-one single, which went on to be used as the theme song for the Japanese version of Happy Feet.

On November 7, NEWS simultaneously released their seventh single, "Weeeek" and their second album, Pacific. Both releases debut topped their respective charts with "Weeeek" selling 263,000 copies in its first week and Pacific selling 196,000 copies in their first week. This marked the tenth in Oricon history that an artist had both their single and album debut top the charts simultaneously. To further support their album, NEWS went on a nationwide tour, NEWS Concert Tour Pacific 2007-2008, from December 15, 2007, to January 27, 2008. Because tickets were in such high demand, two more dates were added to the concert, which resulted in NEWS performing at the Tokyo Dome for the first time.

In February 2008 NEWS released their eighth number-one single, "Taiyō no Namida" (太陽のナミダ, Tears of the Sun), which was used as the theme song for the movie Kurosagi, starring Tomohisa Yamashita. NEWS released two more number-one singles, "Summer Time" (May 2008) and "Happy Birthday" (October 2008), before releasing their third studio album Color (November 2008). The release of "Happy Birthday" made NEWS the second group, after the KinKi Kids, to have ten consecutive number-one singles since their debut. Color debuted at the number one position on the charts, giving NEWS their third consecutive album. NEWS released their new single, "Koi no ABO" (恋のABO, Love's ABO) on April 29, 2009. It became their 11th number-one single. Their 12th number-one single titled "Sakura Girl" was released on March 31, 2010. At the "Live! Live! Live! NEWS Dome Party 2010" concert at Tokyo Dome, it was announced that NEWS would be releasing their 13th single, "Fighting Man", on November 3.

=== 2011: Becoming a quartet ===
On October 7, 2011, it was announced that both Ryo Nishikido and Tomohisa Yamashita left the group. The official press release from Johnny & Associates explained that Nishikido was leaving because scheduling conflicts made it difficult for him to be active in both NEWS and Kanjani8, while Yamashita was leaving to concentrate on solo projects. Nishikido continued his activities with Kanjani8 but not NEWS. NEWS continued as a four-member group with Keiichiro Koyama, Takahisa Masuda, Shigeaki Kato and Yuya Tegoshi.

=== 2012–2013: NEWS' four-member comeback ===
On April 15, 2012, a countdown appeared on the Johnny's Entertainment website, revealing the four current member's outlines, suggesting a comeback. On April 16, Johnny's special site for NEWS restarted its countdown, which hit "0:00:00" on April 18 (12 midnight, JST). The time coincided with NEWS' member Keiichiro Koyama's radio program "K-chan NEWS" to start its broadcast. Koyama's special guests were co-members Tegoshi Yuya, Takahisa Masuda, and Kato Shigeaki. Earlier, Keiichiro Koyama had mentioned something about a new single and best-of album.

Fans could participate in their Best of Album. Fans voted for their "Top Four Favorite NEWS songs" on Johnny's Entertainment site starting April 18 at 12 noon, JST.

On May 7, JE side announced the new album titled NEWS Best. It was released on June 13. The album came in a regular edition and a limited-edition version.

Both versions included a CD containing all 15 of the group's A-side singles. The regular edition included an extra CD with the group's top 15 non-single songs as voted by fans. The limited edition included an extra CD with previously unreleased solo songs.

On July 18, NEWS released "Chankapana", their first single as a quartet. The single is available in 5 different version and a limited box set collection of all versions. The music video premiered on TV on July 9, 2012. The single sold 121,097 on its first day and went on to become number one on Oricon Weekly Singles Chart.

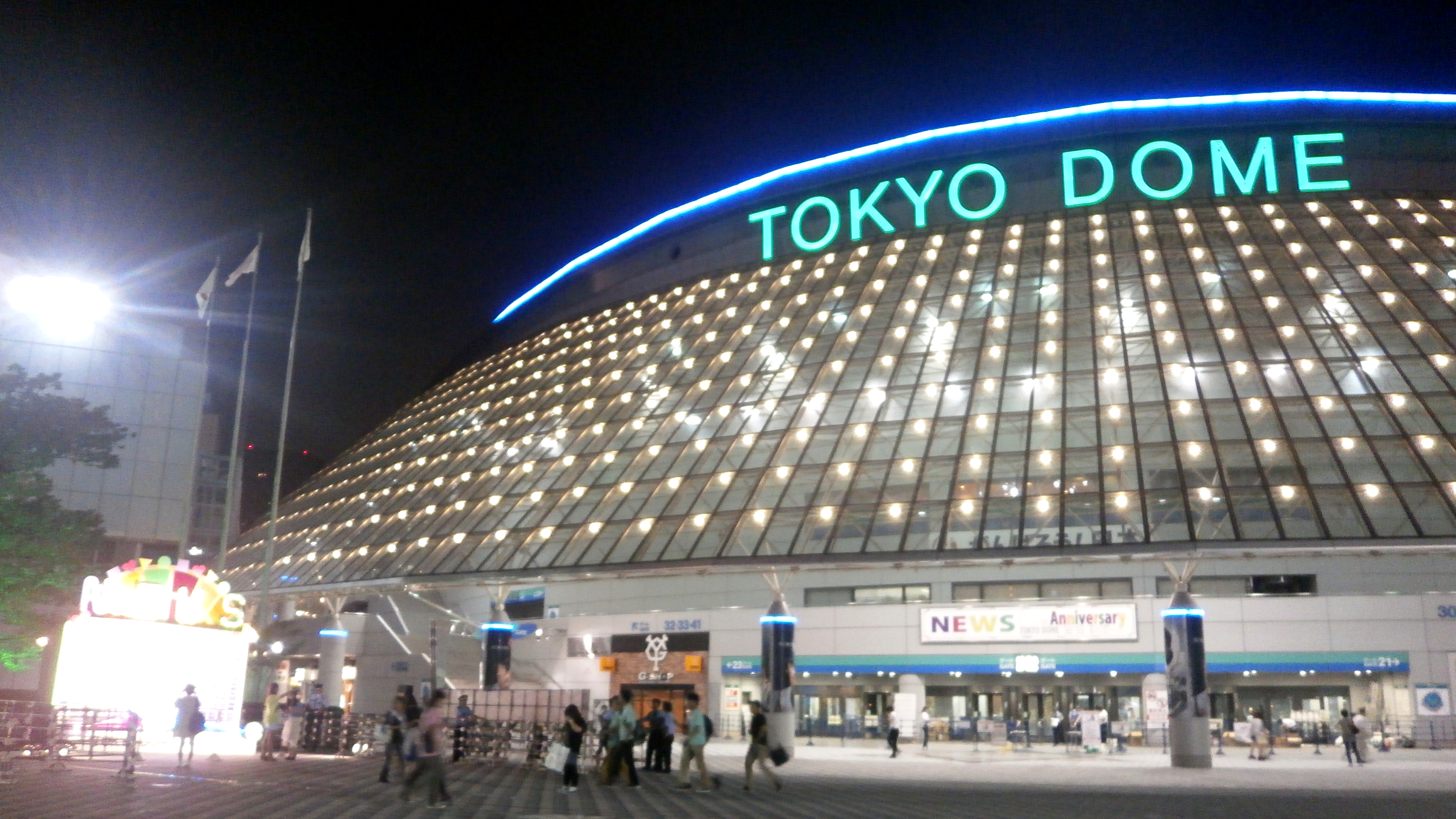
Tokyo Dome the day of NEWS 10th Anniversary show

On July 17, 2013, NEWS released their fifth studio album of the same name. The album contains seventeen tracks, four of them being solo songs. The new tracks were used in the group's tenth anniversary tour. The group's logo, a purple square, a pink heart, a yellow triangle, and a green circle, was commonly used in this time period. Each shape and/or represents one member, along with one letter (N, E, W, or S).

=== 2014–2020: NEWS four-member era ===
On February 25, 2015, NEWS released another album, White.

From 2017, the band started the NEWS 4-part series, in which 4 albums were produced and each album started with a letter in the group name: N for NEVERLAND, E for EPCOTIA, W for WORLDISTA and S for STORY.

Yuya Tegoshi left the group on June 19, 2020.

=== 2020–present: Activities as a trio ===
On December 23, 2020, NEWS released "Beautiful / Chinchaumakka / Kanariya" their first single as a trio.

From June 30, 2021 to August 17, 2022, the group had released 3 more singles and 1 album, named "BURN", "Mirai e/ReBorn", "LOSER/Sanjuushi" and Ongaku respectively.

On August 9, 2023, NEWS released their 13th album NEWS EXPO for the group's 20th anniversary and soon after held a concert tour "NEWS 20th Anniversary LIVE 2023 NEWS EXPO" from August 19 to November 30. They also performed live at Tokyo Dome on December 20 and 21 of the same year celebreating the event.

On September 6, 2024, the group posted on a special site, information about the worldwide release of their 500 songs on streaming sites, starting with 150 songs from 32 singles on September 15, with that day also having a special live stream celebrating the group's 21st anniversary in both YouTube and Line Music.

On November 13, 2024, NEWS released a single called "Acchi Muite Hoi". It was ranked number one on the "ORICON Weekly Singles Ranking" and sold 133,000 copies in its initial week.

Since May 16, 2025, all concert DVDs from NEWS Never Ending Wonderful Story to NEWS 20th Anniversary LIVE 2023 in TOKYO DOME BEST HIT PARADE!!! ~Shinguru Zenbu Yacchaimasu~ was streamed online by Amazon Prime Video. The videos are released every other Friday and include special bonus content to be released on September 15, NEWS' anniversary date. Live recordings starting from the NEVERLAND tour would also be available on various music streaming services.

On August 6, 2025, the group released their 15th album Henshin. The song "JOYER" was used to promote their second collaboration event with Joypolis, an indoor amusement park.

== Members ==
Current members

- Keiichiro Koyama – vocals (2003–present), group leader (2012–present)
- Shigeaki Kato – vocals (2003–present)
- Takahisa Masuda – vocals (2003–present)

Former members

- Takahiro Moriuchi – vocals (2003)
- Hiroki Uchi – vocals (2003–2005)
- Hironori Kusano – vocals (2003–2006)
- Ryo Nishikido – vocals (2003–2011)
- Tomohisa Yamashita – vocals (2003–2011)
- Yuya Tegoshi – vocals (2003–2020)

== Discography ==
Studio albums

- Touch (2005)
- Pacific (2007)
- Color (2008)
- Live (2010)
- NEWS (2013)
- White (2015)
- Quartetto (2016)
- Neverland (2017)
- Epcotia (2018)
- Worldista (2019)
- Story (2020)
- Ongaku (2022)
- NEWS Expo (2023)
- JapaNEWS (2024)
- Henshin (2025)
- KMK (2026)

Compilation albums

- NEWS Best (2012)
