= Shūji to Akira =

Band

Shūji to Akira 修二と彰
- Origin: Japan
- Genres: Pop
- Years active: 2005, 2017, 2020
- Labels: Johnny's Entertainment; J Storm
- Past members: Kazuya Kamenashi; Tomohisa Yamashita

Shūji to Akira (修二と彰; lit. Shūji and Akira) was a special temporary unit formed by KAT-TUN member Kazuya Kamenashi and NEWS member Tomohisa Yamashita for their 2005 drama Nobuta o Produce. Shūji (修二) and Akira (彰) are the names of the characters Kamenashi and Yamashita play in the drama respectively. Although the drama has long finished on television, the duo have revived their performance of their song "Seishun Amigo" (青春アミーゴ, Youthful Friends) numerous times. In 2017, they formed another special temporary unit, Kame to Yamapi (亀と山P; lit. Kame and Yamapi), for their 2017 drama Boku, Unmei no Hito desu.

== "Seishun Amigo" ==
"Seishun Amigo 青春アミーゴ"

Single by Shūji to Akira
- B-side: "Colorful"; "Kizuna"
- Released: November 2, 2005
- Recorded: 2005
- Genre: Pop
- Length: 26:28 (Regular edition); 13:15 (Limited edition)
- Label: Johnny's Entertainment

=== Single information ===
The limited edition consists of three songs and a special 12-page photo booklet, and the regular edition consists three songs and their instrumentals. "Seishun Amigo" was used as the theme song for the drama Nobuta wo Produce starring Kamenashi, Yamashita and Maki Horikita. Musically, the song has a resemblance to Japanese kayōkyoku music of the 1980s.

=== Track list ===
Regular Edition
No.	Title	Lyrics	Music	Length
1.	"Seishun Amigo"	Zopp	Shusui, Fredrik Hult, Ola Larsson, Jonas Engstrand	4:36
2.	"Colorful" (カラフル "Karafuru")	Tomohisa Yamashita	Kosuke Morimoto	4:29
3.	"Kizuna" (絆 "Bonds")	Kazuya Kamenashi	Koji Makaino	4:11
4.	"Seishun Amigo" (Instrumental)	Zopp	Shusui, Fredrik Hult, Ola Larsson, Jonas Engstrand	4:36
5.	"Colorful" (Instrumental)	Yamashita	Morimoto	4:29
6.	"Kizuna" (Instrumental)	Kamenashi	Makaino	4:11

Limited Edition
No.	Title	Lyrics	Music	Length
1.	"Seishun Amigo"	Zopp	Shusui, Fredrik Hult, Ola Larsson, Jonas Engstrand	4:36
2.	"Colorful"	Tomohisa Yamashita	Kosuke Morimoto	4:29
3.	"Kizuna"	Kazuya Kamenashi	Koji Makaino	4:11

=== Chart information ===
The unit's sole single "Seishun Amigo" was released on November 2, 2005, and debuted at number one on the Oricon singles weekly chart, selling 520,419 copies. It maintained its number one spot the following week, selling another 250,108 copies. The single sold more than a million copies in less than four weeks and spent a total of sixty-five weeks on the Oricon charts. The single was the best-selling single of 2005 and the third best-selling single of 2006.

In 2010, Seishun Amigo was reported by the Oricon's magazine, OriStar, for having sold over 1,627,000 copies and was later certified Million by RIAJ denoting over 1,000,000 shipments.

=== Charts and certifications ===
Charts

Chart (2005)	Peak position
Japan Oricon Weekly Singles Chart	1
Japan Oricon Yearly Singles Chart	1
Chart (2006)	Peak position
Japan Oricon Weekly Singles Chart	1
Japan Oricon Yearly Singles Chart	3
Sweden Hitlistan Weekly Singles Chart	41

Sales and certifications

Country	Provider	Sales	Certification
Japan	RIAJ	1,627,000+	Million

== Performances ==
- 2005.10.23 Utawara Hot Hit 10
- 2005.10.27 Utaban
- 2005.10.28 Music Station
- 2005.10.31 Hey! Hey! Hey! Music Champ
- 2005.11.04 Music Fighter
- 2005.11.04 Music Station
- 2005.11.11 Music Station
- 2005.11.20 Utawara Hot Top 10
- 2005.11.30 Best Artist (ベストアーティスト, Besuto Ateisuto)
- 2005.12.23 Music Station Super Live 2005
- 2005.12.31 Johnny's Countdown Live
- 2006.03.18 Song of Japan Voted by Families (家族で選ぶにっぽんの歌)
- 2006.08.26 24-Hour Television (24時間テレビ, 24 Jikan Terebi)
- 2007.12.31 Johnny's Countdown Live
- 2008.12.31 Johnny's Countdown Live
- 2009.08.31 24-Hour Television
- 2009.12.15 Best Artist
- 2009.12.31 Johnny's Countdown Live
- 2015.12.31 Johnny's Countdown Live
- 2017.07.01 The Music Day
- 2017.12.06 2017 FNS Music Festival

== "Senaka goshi no Chance" ==
"Senaka goshi no Chance 背中越しのチャンス"

Single by Kame to Yamapi
- B-side: "Follow Me"; "Bird"; "Super Funker!!"; "Forever Summer"; "Gyakuten Revolution"
- Released: May 17, 2017
- Recorded: 2017
- Genre: Pop
- Length: 27:46 (Regular edition); 4:33 (Limited edition 1); 27:19 (Limited edition 2)
- Label: J-Storm

=== Single information ===
Limited edition 1 consists of one song and its music video and making-of and a special 8-panel lyrics card, limited edition 2 consists of four songs and three instrumentals and a 24-page lyrics booklet, and the regular edition consists of three songs and their instrumentals. "Senaka goshi no Chance" was used as the theme song for the drama Boku, Unmei no Hito desu starring Kamenashi, Yamashita, and Fumino Kimura.

=== Track list ===
Regular Edition
No.	Title	Lyrics	Music	Length
1.	"Senaka goshi no Chance"	Koudai Iwatsubo	Iwatsubo
2.	"Forever Summer"	Tomohisa Yamashita, Kazuya Kamenashi	Yamashita, Kamenashi, Zen Nishizawa
3.	"Gyakuten Revolution" (逆転レボルシオン "Reverse Revolution")	Zopp	Jonas Mengler, Pink Pierrot
4.	"Senaka goshi no Chance" (Instrumental)	Iwatsubo	Iwatsubo
5.	"Forever Summer" (Instrumental)	Yamashita, Kamenashi	Yamashita, Kamenashi, Nishizawa
6.	"Gyakuten Revolution" (Instrumental)	Zopp	Mengler, Pink Pierrot

Limited Edition 1
No.	Title	Lyrics	Music	Length
1.	"Senaka goshi no Chance"	Iwatsubo	Iwatsubo
2.	"Senaka goshi no Chance" (Music video + making-of)	Iwatsubo	Iwatsubo

Limited Edition 2
No.	Title	Lyrics	Music	Length
1.	"Senaka goshi no Chance"	Iwatsubo	Iwatsubo
2.	"Follow Me" (Kamenashi solo)	Kamenashi	Chris Wahle, CR
3.	"Bird" (Yamashita solo)	Yamashita	Greg Bonnick, Hayden Chapman, Adrian Mckinnon, Takuya Harada
4.	"Super Funker!!"	Yuuki Fujii	Dailydose
5.	"Follow Me" (Instrumental)	Kamenashi	Wahle, CR
6.	"Bird" (Instrumental)	Yamashita	Bonnick, Chapman, Mckinnon, Harada
7.	"Super Funker!!" (Instrumental)	Fujii	Dailydose

=== Chart information ===
The single debuted at number one on the Oricon singles weekly chart, selling 175,269 copies. The single spent a total of twenty-three weeks on the Oricon charts. "Senaka goshi no Chance" debuted at number sixty on the Billboard Japan Hot 100 chart on May 8, 2017. It rose to number forty-one on May 22 and peaked at number one the following week. The song charted for eleven weeks on the Hot 100 chart. The single also topped the Billboard Japan top singles sales chart, selling 188,231 copies in its first week.

The single was certified Gold by RIAJ in May 2017.

=== Charts and certifications ===
==== Charts ====
Chart (2017)	Peak position
Japan Oricon Weekly Singles Chart	1
Japan Billboard Hot 100 Chart	1
Japan Billboard Top Single Sales Chart	1

==== Sales and certifications ====
Country	Provider	Sales	Certification
Japan	RIAJ	220,589+	Gold

== Performances ==
- 2017.05.13 Count Down TV
- 2017.05.16 Utacon
- 2017.05.19 Music Station
- 2017.05.19 Buzz Rhythm
- 2017.05.26 Music Station
- 2017.07.01 The Music Day
- 2017.11.28 Best Artist 2017
- 2017.12.06 2017 FNS Music Festival
