= Kurosagi (film) =

- Film poster
- Directed by: Yasuharu Ishii
- Written by: Eriko Shinozaki
- Starring: Tomohisa Yamashita; Maki Horikita
- Music by: Kousuke Yamashita
- Release date: March 8, 2008 (Japan)
- Running time: 126 minutes
- Country: Japan
- Language: Japanese

Kurosagi (Japanese: 映画 クロサギ) is a 2008 Japanese live-action film directed by Yasuharu Ishii, based on the manga series of the same name by Takeshi Natsuhara and Kuromaru. After the finale of the TV series in June, TBS received many questions about whether there would be a new season or a film. TBS decided to shoot a film, beginning in August 2007.

On March 8, 2008, the cast appeared on stage at Toho Cinemas Roppongi Hills. At the end of the conference, a guard with a suitcase filled with 3,800,000,000 yen (since it was March 8) appeared on stage. Yamashita said he would make another Kurosagi film, shooting it overseas.

The official theme song is "Taiyō no Namida" (太陽のナミダ). It is performed by NEWS, a 6-member band. Tomohisa Yamashita, who also plays the lead role, is in the band.

== Plot ==
A young man named Kurosaki had his family destroyed by con artists. When he grows up, he becomes a swindler to avenge his family. He swindles other con artists and returns the money to their victims.

== Cast ==
- Tomohisa Yamashita as Kurosagi (Kurosaki)
- Maki Horikita as Yoshikawa Tsurara
- Yui Ichikawa as Mishima Yukari
- Mao Daichi as Sakura
- Naoto Takenaka as Ishigaki Tetsu
- Renji Ishibashi
