= List of accolades received by Spirited Away =

Spirited Away accolades
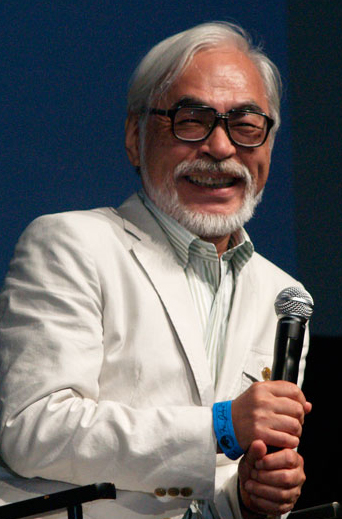
- Hayao Miyazaki received several awards and nominations for his direction and screenplay.
Accolades
Award	Wins	Nominations

Totals (Note: Certain award groups do not simply award one winner. They acknowledge several different recipients, have runners-up, and have third place. Since this is a specific recognition and is different from losing an award, runner-up mentions are considered wins in this award tally. For simplification and to avoid errors, each award in this list has been presumed to have had a prior nomination.)
- Wins: 32
- Nominations: 37

Spirited Away (Japanese: 千と千尋の神隠し, Hepburn: Sen to Chihiro no Kamikakushi; transl. Sen and Chihiro's Spiriting Away) is a 2001 Japanese animated fantasy film written and directed by Hayao Miyazaki. It was produced by Toshio Suzuki, animated by Studio Ghibli, and distributed by Toho. The film stars Rumi Hiiragi, alongside Miyu Irino, Mari Natsuki, Takashi Naito, Yasuko Sawaguchi, Tsunehiko Kamijō, Takehiko Ono, and Bunta Sugawara. In Spirited Away, Chihiro "Sen" Ogino moves to a new neighborhood and inadvertently enters the world of kami (spirits of Japanese Shinto folklore). After her parents are turned into pigs by the witch Yubaba, Chihiro takes a job working in Yubaba's bathhouse to find a way to free herself and her parents and return to the human world.

Released in Japan on 20 July 2001, Spirited Away was widely acclaimed and commercially successful, grossing US$396 million at the worldwide box office, and becoming the highest-grossing film in Japanese history until 2020. Spirited Away was a co-recipient of the Golden Bear at the 2002 Berlin International Film Festival and became the first hand-drawn, Japanese anime and non-English-language animated film to win the Academy Award for Best Animated Feature at the 75th Academy Awards.

== Accolades ==
Accolades received by Spirited Away
Award	Year	Category	Recipient	Result	Ref.
6th Animation Kobe	2001	Theatrical Film Award	Spirited Away	Won	
44th Blue Ribbon Awards	2001	Best Film	Spirited Away	Won	
5th Japan Media Arts Festival	2001	Grand Prize	Spirited Away	Won	
56th Mainichi Film Awards	2001	Best Film	Spirited Away	Won	
56th Mainichi Film Awards	2001	Best Animated Film	Spirited Away	Won	
56th Mainichi Film Awards	2001	Best Director	Hayao Miyazaki	Won	
25th Japan Academy Award	2002	Best Film	Spirited Away	Won	
25th Japan Academy Award	2002	Best Song	Youmi Kimura	Won	
52nd Berlin International Film Festival	2002	Golden Bear	Spirited Away	Won (Note: Shared with Bloody Sunday)	
Cinekid Festival	2002	Cinekid Film Award	Spirited Away	Won (Note: Shared with The Little Bird Boy)	
21st Hong Kong Film Awards	2002	Best Asian Film	Spirited Away	Won	
Tokyo Anime Award	2002	Animation of the Year	Spirited Away	Won	
Tokyo Anime Award	2002	Best Art Direction	Yôji Takeshige	Won	
Tokyo Anime Award	2002	Best Character Design	Hayao Miyazaki	Won	
Tokyo Anime Award	2002	Best Director	Hayao Miyazaki	Won	
Tokyo Anime Award	2002	Best Music	Joe Hisaishi	Won	
Tokyo Anime Award	2002	Best Screenplay	Hayao Miyazaki	Won	
Tokyo Anime Award	2002	Best Voice Actor	Rumi Hiiragi as Chihiro	Won	
Tokyo Anime Award	2002	Notable Entry	Hayao Miyazaki	Won	
National Board of Review	2002	Best Animated Film	Spirited Away	Won	
New York Film Critics Online	2002	Best Animated Feature	Spirited Away	Won	
75th Academy Awards	2003	Best Animated Feature	Spirited Away	Won	
30th Annie Awards	2003	Best Animated Feature	Spirited Away	Won	
30th Annie Awards	2003	Directing in an Animated Feature Production	Hayao Miyazaki	Won	
30th Annie Awards	2003	Writing in a Feature Production	Hayao Miyazaki	Won	
30th Annie Awards	2003	Music in a Feature Production	Joe Hisaishi	Won	
28th César Awards	2003	Best Foreign Film	Spirited Away	Nominated	
8th Critics' Choice Awards	2003	Best Animated Feature	Spirited Away	Won	
68th New York Film Critics Circle Awards	2003	Best Animated Feature	Spirited Away	Won	
29th Saturn Awards	2003	Best Animated Film	Spirited Away	Won	
29th Saturn Awards	2003	Best Writing	Hayao Miyazaki; Cindy Davis Hewitt (English adaptation); Donald H. Hewitt (English adaptation)	Nominated	
29th Saturn Awards	2003	Best Music	Joe Hisaishi	Nominated	
Hugo Awards	2003	Best Dramatic Presentation (Long Form)	Spirited Away	Nominated	
7th Golden Satellite Awards	2003	Best Animated or Mixed Media Feature	Spirited Away	Won	
19th Amsterdam Fantastic Film Festival	2003	Silver Scream Award	Spirited Away	Won	
54th Christopher Awards	2003	Feature Film	Spirited Away	Won	
57th British Academy Film Awards	2004	Best Film Not in the English Language	Spirited Away	Nominated	
