= Kurosagi (manga) =

Japanese manga series

- First tankōbon volume cover, featuring Koshiro Kurosaki

クロサギ
- Genre: Thriller
- Manga
- Written by: Takeshi Natsuhara
- Illustrated by: Kuromaru
- Published by: Shogakukan
- Magazine: Weekly Young Sunday (2003–2008); Weekly Big Comic Spirits (2008–2013, 2022)
- Original run: November 13, 2003 – November 7, 2022
- Volumes: 43
- Series titles
- 1. Kurosagi (2003–2008, 20 volumes); 2. Shin Kurosagi (2008–2012, 18 volumes); 3. Shin Kurosagi: Kanketsu-hen (2012–2013, 4 volumes); 4. Kurosagi Sakidō: 18-sai Shinseijin Sagi Hanzan-hen (2022, 1 volume)
- Television drama
- Directed by: Yasuharu Ishii; Shunichi Hirano; Atsushi Takei
- Written by: Eriko Shinozaki
- Music by: Kosuke Yamashita
- Original network: TBS
- Original run: April 14, 2006 – June 23, 2006
- Episodes: 11
- Live-action film
- Kurosagi (2008)
- Television drama
- Directed by: Kenta Tanaka; Yasuharu Ishii; Shunichi Hirano
- Written by: Eriko Shinozaki
- Music by: Hideakira Kimura
- Original network: TBS
- Original run: October 21, 2022 – December 23, 2022
- Episodes: 10
- icon

Kurosagi (クロサギ; lit. 'The Black Swindler') is a Japanese manga series written by Takeshi Natsuhara and illustrated by Kuromaru. It was serialized in Shogakukan's seinen manga magazine Weekly Young Sunday from November 2003 to July 2008, with its chapters collected in 20 tankōbon volumes. It was followed by Shin Kurosagi (2008–2012), Shin Kurosagi: Kanketsu-hen (2012–2013), and Kurosagi Sakidō: 18-sai Shinseijin Sagi Hanzan-hen (2022); the three were serialized in Weekly Big Comic Spirits. The series follows Koshiro Kurosaki, a boy who swindles only other professional swindlers known as shirosagi.

A 11-episode television drama adaptation was broadcast on TBS from April to June 2006. It was followed by a live-action film adaptation premiered in March 2008. A second 10-episode television drama adaptation was broadcast on TBS from October to December 2022.

By September 2022, the manga had over 8.5 million copies in circulation. In 2008, Kurosagi won the 53rd Shogakukan Manga Award in the general category.

== Plot ==
Six years ago, Kurosaki's family was destroyed when a shirosagi (シロサギ)—a "white swindler", who focuses on defrauding others—swindled Kurosaki's father of their family's life savings. As a result, his father killed Kurosaki's mother and sister before committing suicide. Since then, Kurosaki has devoted himself to becoming a "kurosagi" ("black swindler"), who swindles other swindlers, as a means of revenge.

As a "kurosagi", Kurosaki's acts have helped innocent victims of swindling schemes get their money back. However, he is frequently met with opposition by a stubborn grad student, who seeks to become a prosecutor.

== Characters ==
Koshiro Kurosaki (黒崎 高志郎, Kurosaki Koshiro)
Portrayed by: Tomohisa Yamashita (2006 drama), Sho Hirano (2022 drama)
A 21-year-old famed swindler known as the Kurosagi (or Black Swindler) because he only targets professional swindlers, conning them out of their own money, leaving them in ruins, and then using that money to pay back his client who are con victims. His hatred against swindler started because his father was conned out of his wealth and left him with debts. This misfortune drove his father to kill his wife and daughter and, finally, himself. He tried to kill Katsuragi, who was connected to conman who led his family's misfortunes, but failed and recruited to be "pest control" for conmen who broke the "code" instead. He also possesses hatred to banks as banks gave his father final push to his despair.
Tsurara Yoshikawa (吉川 氷柱, Yoshikawa Tsurara)
Portrayed by: Maki Horikita (2006 drama), Yuina Kuroshima (2022 drama)
Tsurara Yoshikawa is a law student who disapproves of Kurosagi's swindling ways but falls in love with him. She lives in Kurosaki's apartment as a tenant. Her dream is to be a prosecutor. When she accidentally discovers Kurosaki's job as a "kurosagi", he kicks her out of the apartment in order to protect her from the repercussions of his actions rather than facing the other option of silencing her. She later returns as a tenant in Kurosaki's building with condition that she would not do anything which endangers Kurosaki's operations. A condition which she accepts as she is aware how powerful Katsuragi, Kurosaki's backer, in the criminal world and how connected he is. Tsurara has a deadbeat father who becomes an unwitting accomplice in a con operation. Kurosaki saves Tsurara's father by trapping the ringleader while leaving no traces of his involvement in the con operation. In the end of manga timeline, she manages to graduate the law school and becomes a prosecutor while still retaining his faith in law.
Toshio Katsuragi (桂木 敏夫, Katsuragi Toshio)
Portrayed by: Tsutomu Yamazaki (2006 drama), Tomokazu Miura (2022 drama)
Known as the "Fixer", Katsuragi is an information broker who supplies Kurosaki with information for a cut of the profit Kurosaki makes and supports Kurosaki with acts such as buying defunct companies and being the mastermind behind many of Kurosaki's schemes. Though he is somewhat of a father-figure to Kurosaki, he is a nefarious character as he employs other swindlers aside from Kurosaki. He uses his snack bar as his formal base. He is often seen cooking and a throwaway comment by author points out it is reason he is overweight is he eats all his cooking. He is significantly connected to conman who led Kurosakis' misfortunes. For that reason, Kurosaki tried to kill him but failed. Instead of killing Kurosaki, he recruited Kurosaki as titular Black Swindler.
Masaru Kashina (神志名 将, Kashina Masaru)
Portrayed by: Show Aikawa (2006 drama), Kai Inowaki (2022 drama)}
Appearing in the manga and film adaptation of the series, Masaru Kashina is the newly appointed assistant inspector of the East Tokyo Department, in charge of intellectual crimes. Self-righteous and dedicated to returning law and order to Tokyo, he becomes obsessed with apprehending Kurosaki after learning of the Black Swindler and his methods of operation. Because his paternal uncle was a swindler, Kashina was adopted by his mother's relatives and had faked his death when he was two years old in order to create a new identity in order to pursue the swindlers he despises. His obsession of Kurosaki partly stems from the fact that he is aware the fact that he and Kurosaki both have their lives destroyed by swindlers.
Yoichi Shiraishi (白石 陽一, Shiraishi Yōichi)
Portrayed by: Koji Kato (2006 drama), Koji Yamamoto (2022 drama)
Another Kurosagi or "Black Swindler". He always dress and acts elegantly, on and off the "job". Unlike Kurosaki who take the "job" offered by Katsuragi and acts against usually small time conmen, Shiraishi acts more as freelance who targets corrupt corporations. While Kurosaki acts as temporary partner and another "mark" to conmen, Shiraishi infiltrates the companies as career hopper. His hatred on corrupt companies stems from his past where his father was ordered by the real estate company he works to persuade their neighbors to move to a badly constructed building. One year after moving, an incident at the new building claimed six lives, including Shiraishi's mother. Shiraishi and his father had to endure their neighbor criticisms despite the fact that they are also victims.
Mikimoto (御木本)
Portrayed by: Shiro Kishibe (2006 drama), Bandō Yajūrō (2022 drama)
A conman who is responsible for Kurosaki's father lost his savings and drove him to commit murder-suicide. He has a hobby on folding crane origami. He always leaves a headless crane origami to his mark when he almost completely trap his targets, symbolizing the target's fate.
Kuro
Kurosagi's pet cat. She is part Black Scottish cat. As she is not purebred, she is unsalable. Kurosaki picked her from closed dishonest pet shop before the story starts. She is friendly with Kurosaki and tenants of his building.

== Media ==
=== Manga ===
Written by Takeshi Natsuhara and illustrated by Kuromaru, Kurosagi started in Shogakukan's seinen manga magazine Weekly Young Sunday on November 13, 2003, (Note: It started in the magazine's 50th issue of 2003, released on November 13 of that same year.) to July 31, 2008, until the magazine ceased its publication. Its chapters were collected in 20 tankōbon volumes, released from April 5, 2004, to September 3, 2008.

The series resumed in Weekly Big Comic Spirits, under the title Shin Kurosagi (新クロサギ), on September 6, 2008, and finished on August 6, 2012. (Note: It was serialized until the magazine's combined 36th–37th issue of 2012, released on August 6 of that same year.) Shogakukan collected its chapters in 18 tankōbon volumes, released from December 26, 2008, to March 29, 2013.

A third series, Shin Kurosagi: Kanketsu-hen (新クロサギ完結編), was serialized in Weekly Big Comic Spirits from August 27, 2012, (Note: It started in the magazine's 39th issue of 2012, released on August 27 of that same year.) to July 29, 2013. Its chapters were collected in four tankōbon volumes, released from June 28 to December 27, 2013.

A short-term series, titled Kurosagi Sakidō: 18-sai Shinseijin Sagi Hanzan-hen (クロサギ再起動 –18歳新成人詐欺犯罪編–), was serialized in Weekly Big Comic Spirits from September 26 to November 7, 2022. Its chapters were collected in a single tankōbon volume, released on November 10, 2022.

=== Live-action ===
An eleven-episode television drama adaptation was broadcast on TBS from April 14 to June 23, 2006.

Another ten-episode television drama adaptation was broadcast on TBS from October 21 to December 23, 2022.

A live-action film adaptation premiered on March 8, 2008.

The 2006 and 2022 series and the 2008 film premiered on Netflix in the United States in January 2025.

== Reception ==
In 2008, along with Tetsuji Sekiya's Bambino!, Kurosagi won the 53rd Shogakukan Manga Award in the general category. By September 2022, the manga had over 8.5 million copies in circulation.
