= Mugiko-san to =

- DVD cover
- Directed by: Keisuke Yoshida
- Written by: Keisuke Yoshida; Ryo Nishihara
- Produced by: Toshiki Kimura
- Starring: Maki Horikita; Ryuhei Matsuda; Yo Kimiko
- Cinematography: Takayuki Shida
- Edited by: Yoshinori Ota
- Music by: Kōji Endō
- Production companies: Stairway Films; Phantom Film; Production I.G
- Release date: December 21, 2013 (Japan)
- Running time: 95 minutes
- Country: Japan
- Language: Japanese

My Little Sweet Pea (Japanese: 麦子さんと, Hepburn: Mugiko-san to) is a Japanese comedy drama film directed by Keisuke Yoshida and starring Horikita Maki. It was released on December 21, 2013.

The story is about parent-child love, in which an otaku girl who works at an anime shop aims to become a voice actor, but her mother died who once abandoned her and her brother. She follows in the footsteps of her youth and visits her mother's hometown. Director Yoshida spent seven years on the concept of this original work.

== Cast ==
- Horikita Maki as Mugiko
- Matsuda Ryuhei as Norio
- Yo Kimiko as Saiko Akaike
- Nukumizu Yoichi as Imoto
- Yumi Aso as Michiru
- Guadalcanal Taka as Haruo Aso (Yawatahama inn)
- Eri Fuse as Natsue Aso (Haruo's wife)
- Amane Okayama as Senzo Aso (Haruo's son)

== Plot ==
Mugiko Koiwa gets off at Goto Station, the nearest train station to her mother's hometown, in order to have her mother Saiko's (Saiko Akaike) remains interred in the cemetery, and takes a taxi to Yawatahama Inn where she plans to stay. Everyone in town knows Saiko from about 30 years ago, when she aspired to become an idol singer in Tokyo, including the taxi driver Imoto and the innkeeper, the Aso's, and they all say that Mugiko very closely resembles Saiko.

The scene enters a flashback when Saiko lived with Mugiko in an apartment when Saiko was alive. Mugiko and her elder brother, Norio, have been living together in the apartment for a rent of 90,000 yen per month for three years since her father died. Mugiko works at a store of "anime" goods, and hopes to become a voice actress. There is a life-size panel of a character from a popular anime at home. Norio works at a pachinko/pachi-slot parlor and has pachi-slot machines at home.

Then her mother Saiko suddenly appears, and Norio leaves to start living with his girlfriend, leaving Saiko and Mugiko to live together. Mugiko is frustrated by Saiko's noisy alarm clock, is appalled that her manga books were mistakenly thrown away by Saiko, and gets annoyed when Saiko talks to her while she's watching anime. However, Saiko was also her mother, making breakfast for Mugiko, cleaning the love hotel rooms in the morning to earn money, and trying to understand her daughter's hobby of anime. One night, Mugiko makes pork cutlet for Saiko, but Saiko eats it and then throws up.

Saiko dies shortly after that. Norio tells Mugiko in front of Saiko's body at the hospital that she had already been suffering from terminal liver cancer when she came to their apartment. After the two picked up the remains of Saiko, Norio sobs in front of the urn at the crematorium. Norio tells Mugiko to go alone for the interment to be done after 49 days. Then, it is revealed that Saiko was sending Norio 150,000 yen every month. Until then, Norio always told Mugiko in a patronizing manner that he was paying for most of their living expenses.

The flashback scene ends. That night at the inn, the Aso's produce some old photos of Saiko and tell Mugiko about the song "Red Sweet Pea" that Saiko sang at an amateur singing contest in a local temple festival. Also, a large number of men that knew Saiko from the past and have heard about Mugiko's arrival come to the inn, and what would have been a solitary dinner turns into a party.

At 10 a.m. the next day (the second day), Mugiko goes to the cemetery and is told by Michiru, the woman at the reception, that she can't inter Saiko's remains because Mugiko lost her burial permit. With a reissued permit coming the day after next, Michiru sympathizes with Mugiko, who is worried about the cost of her extended stay, and tells her to stay in Michiru's apartment. Michiru is a divorced mother living separately from her child. Michiru says she learned some cooking from Saiko a long time ago, and the meal she cooked for Mugiko is one of those that Saiko made when she lived with Mugiko. It was the same pumpkin cooked rice.

That night, Mugiko is taken to a temple festival by the innkeeper's lazy son, Senzo Aso. At the amateur singing contest that is being held, the master of the ceremony asks Mugiko to come up on stage and asks her to sing "Red Sweet Pea.'' Mugiko is much embarrassed and cannot sing.

On the third day, Mugiko goes bowling with the taxi driver, Imoto. Imoto tells her that Saiko's old family was poor and that when she left her house, she took her alarm clock with her. At night, Mugiko meets with Michiru together with Imoto at a pub, and Mugiko gets drunk and criticizes Michiru for not trying to see her child. Feeling awkward, Mugiko leaves Michiru's apartment, taking Saiko's remains, and stays at Yawatahama inn.

On the morning of the fourth day, Mugiko changes into her mourning clothes, takes Imoto's taxi, gives Michiru the burial permit, and completes the interment. She sheds tears as she calls Saiko "Mom" for the first time, regretting she told Saiko that she did not recognize Saiko as her mother when they were living together. Declining Imoto's kind offer to give her a ride in a taxi, Mugiko, refreshed, walks back to Goto Station. On her way, she meets the police officer whose nose bled after being hit by Imoto's taxi on the first day. The officer hands her the burial permit she unwittingly handed to the officer together with a small pack of tissue paper. Then she passes a bicycle carrying an unknown mother and her daughter, whom the mother calls ``Mugi-chan.''
