= Umechan Sensei =

- Genre: Drama
- Written by: Masaya Ozaki
- Directed by: Takafumi Kimura
- Starring: Maki Horikita; Mimura; Keisuke Koide; Tori Matsuzaka; Shingo Tsurumi; Kaho Minami; Tsurutarō Kataoka; Katsumi Takahashi; Mitsuko Baisho
- Narrated by: Shozo Hayashiya
- Opening theme: "Sakasama no Sora" by SMAP
- Country of origin: Japan
- Original language: Japanese
- No. of episodes: 156

Production
- Producer: Kanako Iwatani
- Running time: 15 minutes

Original release
- Network: NHK
- Release: April 2 – September 29, 2012

Umechan Sensei (梅ちゃん先生) is a Japanese television drama series. It debuted on April 2, 2012. It is about a girl named Umeko Shimomura who, despite being overshadowed by her talented older brother and sister, and despite being thought of as a clumsy child, decides to follow in her father's footsteps and become a doctor. It is the 86th NHK Asadora.

== Synopsis ==
Umeko is the third child of Kenzō Shimomura, a stern and strict doctor at a university hospital, who lives in the Kamata area of Tokyo. Her older siblings are far more talented than her: Takeo is studying to be a doctor and Matsuko, a well-known beauty, is engaged to one of Kenzō's students. At school, Umeko seems to fumble any task given to her, a problem that is made worse by the fact that this is 1945 and the war is in progress. When the war ends and she helps Kenzō save an orphaned boy who got sick, Umeko decides to become a doctor. Almost no one believes she can succeed, but when Takeo suddenly decides to quit his studies and go into business with Yōzō, Kenzo's brother, and when Matsuko finds out her fiance had been killed at the front, Umeko becomes the last chance for a family member to follow in Kenzō's footsteps.

With the help of Nobuo, her next-door neighbor whose father runs a small screw manufacturing shop, she studies furiously and just manages to enter a women's medical school. There she suffers from her lack of talent, but her bright personality and ability to help others make her a respected member of the community. At school she meets Toshio Matsuoka, a talented medical student who admires her father but who is so devoted to research he does not know the first thing about dating women. Upon graduating, she becomes an intern at Kenzō's hospital and starts dating Toshio. While working there she encounters Dr. Sakata, who operates a run-down clinic in the same building as Takeo's business office. She begins to respect his selfless dedication to helping those in the neighborhood and decides to leave the hospital to start her own clinic in Kamata, especially after Sakata dies in an accident. Her ideas about medical practice cause Toshio to accept an offer to do research in America and break up with Umeko. Meanwhile, Matsuko has married Masakazu Katō, a somewhat shy but hardworking salesman who knew her fiance. Takeo has become friendly with Shizuko, Sakata's former nurse. Just when both Umeko's and Nobuo's families begin trying to find arranged marriages for them, the two decide that the only people they really love are each other and decide to get married.

After Umeko and Nobuo marry, it takes them a while to figure out how to balance work and family obligations, especially after Umeko gives birth to their first son. When Nobuo's factory takes in Mitsuo, a young man from northern Japan, as a live-in worker, the young couple have to move back to Umeko's house for lack of space. Takeo's business continues to grow, but when a risky trade fails, it goes bankrupt. Takeo declares he is leaving Shizuko to start out again on his own. After seeing the support he gets, he learns the error of his ways and decides to marry Shizuko and start again from scratch. Yōzō also finally settles down and starts a toy store nearby. Umeko continues to help people beyond just her patients but faces a crisis when a large hospital is built nearby.

Hiroshi, the orphaned boy she helped save, reappears as a pharmaceutical salesman and tries to convince her to close her clinic and join the hospital. Feeling her kind of personal care is better, Umeko refuses and experiences a severe drop in patients at first, but they eventually return wanting her special care. Kenzō retires from the university hospital, only to take up another position in Chiba Prefecture, and Toshio returns from America, still more concerned with research than women. As the era enters the 1960s, Umeko has another child and Nobuo, who has now taken over the factory, gets a prestigious contract to provide parts for the new shinkansen. The story ends with Kenzō, to everyone's surprise, appearing on NHK Nodo Jiman to sing "Ue o muite arukō".

== Cast ==
- Maki Horikita as Umeko Shimomura
- Katsumi Takahashi as Kenzō Shimomura, her father
- Kaho Minami as Yoshiko Shimomura, her mother
- Mimura as Matsuko Shimomura, her sister
- Keisuke Koide as Takeo Shimomura, her brother
- Mitsuko Baisho as Masae Shimomuta, her grandmother
- Shingo Tsurumi as Yōzō Tachibana, Kenzō's brother
- Tsurutarō Kataoka as Kōkichi Yasuoka, the Shimomura's neighbor
- Tōri Matsuzaka as Nobuo Yasuoka, Kōkichi's son, Umeko's childhood friend and eventually, her husband
- Mitsuomi Takahashi as Toshio Matsuoka, Umeko's onetime boyfriend
- Masanori Sera as Dr. Sakata
- Fumino Kimura as Shizuko Nojima, his nurse
- Ken Ōsawa as Masakazu Katō, Matsuko's husband

== Production ==
The series theme song, "Sakasama no sora", was provided by SMAP. It reached the number one slot on the Oricon chart.

== Reception ==
Umechan Sensei finished with an average rating of 20.7% in the Kantō area, the first time an Asadora had averaged over 20% since Kokoro in 2003.

== International broadcast ==
- The broadcast rights for the drama were sold to Sri Lanka with the intention of dubbing it into Sinhalese.
- Thailand It was aired every Saturday to Sunday on Thai PBS under the title "Dr. Ume คุณหมอหน้าใสหัวใจนักสู้"

Preceded by Carnation	Asadora; 2 April 2012 – 29 September 2012	Succeeded by Jun to Ai
