= Reason/Never Lose =

2019 single by Tomohisa Yamashita

Single by Tomohisa Yamashita
- B-side: "Like a Movie"; "Without You"
- Released: February 13, 2019
- Genre: J-pop
- Label: SME Records

Tomohisa Yamashita singles chronology
"Summer Nude '13" (2013)	"Reason/Never Lose" (2019)	"Change" (2019)

"Reason/Never Lose" is Tomohisa Yamashita's first double A-side single. It features two theme songs: "Reason" and "Never Lose", which were used as opening themes for the second season of Ace Attorney.

== Background ==
This is the first single in about 5 years since the previous work "Summer Nude '13". It is the first single after transferring to SME Records, and Yamashita's first double A-side single. It was released in three forms: first press limited edition A, first press limited edition B, and regular edition. There is a first press version of the regular edition.

Both title songs are from the Yomiuri TV/Nippon Television anime series Ace Attorney opening theme. "Never Lose" is used as the first opening theme of the first season while "Reason" is instead used as the second one. Upon learning it would be used in the anime, Yamashita expressed thanks and wanted his fans to enjoy its execution the anime.

The music video for the coupling song "Like a Movie" was directed and produced by Yamashita himself. As a bonus for the first edition of the regular edition, a flyer with a serial code for viewing the original video was included, and it was available for viewing for a limited time. Purchase bonus design decided! /Information on the addition of regular edition first specification benefits. Later, it was included as a bonus video in the regular edition of the DVD and Blu-ray Tomohisa Yamashita Live Tour 2018 Unleashed –Feel the Love–. The CD sold 74,432 units in Japan.

== Track listing ==
1. "Reason"
2. "Never Lose"
3. "Reason" (instrumental)
4. "Never Lose" (instrumental)

DVD

- "Reason" (music video)

=== First production limited edition ===
1. "Never Lose"
2. "Reason"
3. "Never Lose" (instrumental)
4. "Reason" (instrumental)

DVD

- "Never Lose" (music video)

=== Regular edition ===
1. "Reason"
2. "Never Lose"
3. "Like a Movie"
4. "Without You"
