= Nobuta wo Produce =

Japanese TV drama

- Promotional picture for Nobuta wo Produce
- Also known as: 野ブタ。をプロデュース
- Genre: Japanese television drama
- Written by: Gen Shiraiwa (author); Izumi Kizara
- Directed by: Hitoshi Iwamoto; Norika Sakuma
- Starring: Kazuya Kamenashi; Tomohisa Yamashita; Maki Horikita
- Narrated by: Kazuya Kamenashi
- Ending theme: "Seishun Amigo" by Shūji to Akira
- Composer: Ike Yoshihiro
- Country of origin: Japan
- Original language: Japanese
- No. of episodes: 10

Production
- Producer: Hidehiro Kawano
- Running time: About 48-53 minutes

Original release
- Network: NTV-4
- Release: 15 October – 17 December 2005

Related
- Jō no Kyōshitsu; Kuitan

Nobuta wo Produce (野ブタ。をプロデュース, Nobuta o Purodyūsu) is a Japanese television drama produced and aired in 2005 by NTV. The television show is based on the book of the same name by Gen Shiraiwa (ISBN 4-309-01683-9). The story follows the high school lives of Kiritani and Kusano as they attempt to make a shy Kotani into the most popular girl in school.

== Plot overview ==
=== Introducing Nobuta ===
Shuji Kiritani (Kazuya Kamenashi) is a very popular high school boy who is close to Mariko Uehara (Erika Toda), the most popular girl in school, but whom he does not actually love. Akira Kusano (Tomohisa Yamashita), his classmate, does not really have any friends - something that is attributed to the fact that he cannot read the atmosphere well, or rather, he chooses to ignore the atmosphere. One day, a very shy girl, Nobuko Kotani (Maki Horikita) transfers to their school and is instantly picked on by a group of girls for her shyness. As a testimony to their youth, Shuji and Akira team up and decide to "produce" her, to make her popular. They nickname her "Nobuta".

=== Production of Nobuta ===
The various episodes deal with the pair's attempts at making Nobuko popular by making her more appealing. Amidst this, a mysterious person insidiously attempts to waylay all of Shuji and Akira's efforts. Fortunately, the trio always manages to pull through with ingenuity.

=== Finale ===
Shuji has to cope with his loss of popularity after he is caught out lying about Mariko and does not assist when a classmate is beaten up. Despite this, with the knowledge that his two true friends, Akira and Nobuko, will always be there for him, Shuji gets over it. There is also the revelation of Aoi, Kotani's first friend besides Shuji and Akira, as the mysterious antagonist of the story. In the final episode, Shuji discovers that he and his family must move out of Tokyo because of his father's job. Akira follows Shuji to his new hometown and surprises him by showing up at his new school. Nobuko is left alone in Tokyo, but she has overcome her shyness, and is finally able to smile. She also becomes popular among the other students, and is no longer bullied. The end of the drama sees all three characters being able to "live wherever [they] are", having learned the meaning of friendship and love.

== Main characters ==
The drama centers around three main characters: Shuji Kiritani, Akira Kusano, and Nobuko Kotani.

=== Shūji Kiritani ===
Shūji Kiritani (桐谷 修二) treats everything in life as a game, and thus, lives his life as a little white lie. He believes that by keeping up a "cool" facade, he can get to his goal without getting hurt. Because he chooses to hide his true self, Shuji is, on the inside, a truly lonely person. Although he does not like Mariko romantically, he has lunch with her every day in a bid to boost his popularity. He is only truly open to Akira and Nobuko, and considers the two as his only true friends. Always putting the feelings of others before himself, Shuji does not have the power to say "no". He always bottles up his own feelings, and never complains, that is the main reason why he lies.

=== Akira Kusano ===
Akira Kusano

Unlike Shuji, Akira Kusano (草野 彰) is not popular. Constantly on a soy milk high, Akira always finds ways to get on Shujii's nerves. Despite this, they become good friends by the end of the series. With much money to dispense of, Akira finances most of their escapades. With no intention of following the footsteps of his father, the president of a company, Akira is a free spirit who would rather live his a life as a "dime in the street" and enjoy his youth. At one point in the story, it is revealed that Akira has affections for Nobuko. However, he does not pursue his feelings knowing that he will not be able to make her happy. He demonstrates a high prowess in karate easily beating up a bully and smashing through a set of tiles. Naturally forgiving, he is ready to forgive and forget, as long as it preserves his friendship with Shuji and Nobuko

=== Nobuko Kotani ===
Nobuko Kotani

Nobuko Kotani (小谷 信子, Kotani Nobuko) is painfully shy after initially being rejected by her stepfather at a young age. Following this, because she finds it difficult to relate to other students, she has been continuously bullied. Because of this, Nobuko is cynical. She believes that no matter where she is, or no matter how hard she tries, the world will still reject her. With Shuji and Akira's help and encouragement, she begins to open up more to others. Nobuko considers Shuji and Akira as the two people who are the most important to her. At the end of the series, she has finally gathered enough confidence to smile and continue socializing, even without them.

== Minor characters ==
=== Mariko Uehara ===
Nobuko's popular, basketball-playing girlfriend. Mariko Uehara (上原 まり子) brings lunch for Nobuko every day, which shows her determination to have her as happy as all the other students. Although devastated when she finds out that Shuji does not reciprocate her feelings, she gradually comes to accept it. Although she is not officially a member of the Nobuta Producing team, she was indispensable in helping to produce Nobuko. At the end of the series, she has forged a friendship with Nobuko, and becomes her good friend after Shuji and Akira are gone.

=== Kasumi Aoi ===
The main antagonist of the story, though it is found out later in the series. Kasumi strives to destroy all of the trio's efforts, relishing the power of destroying someone's life and making others miserable. Because Nobuko considers Kasumi to be her first friend, nobody suspected her intentions until Shuji found out. Later on, Kasumi learns an important lesson about friendship and redemption, and is given a chance to turn over a new leaf at Nobuko's grace.

== Credits ==
=== Cast ===
Cover of the novel Nobuta wo Produce by Gen Shiraiwa

- Kazuya Kamenashi - Shūji Kiritani (桐谷 修二, Kiritani Shūji)
- Tomohisa Yamashita - Akira Kusano (草野 彰, Kusano Akira)
- Maki Horikita - Nobuko Kotani (小谷 信子, Kotani Nobuko) (aka Nobuta)
- Erika Toda - Mariko Uehara (上原 まり子, Uehara Mariko)
- Rumi Hiiragi - Kasumi Aoi
- Takashi Ukaji - Satoru Kiritani (桐谷 悟, Kiritani Satoru)
- Yuto Nakajima - Koji Kiritani (桐谷 浩二, Kiritani Kōji)
- Yoshinori Okada - Takeshi Yokoyama (横山 武士, Yokoyama Takeshi)
- Tomoya Ishii - Yoshida (吉田 浩, Yoshida)
- Katsumi Takahashi - Ippei Hirayama (平山 一平, Hirayama Ippei)
- Mari Natsuki - Yoko Sada (Katherine) (佐田 杳子(キャサリン), Sada Yōko (Kyasarin))
- Fumiko Mizuta - Kozue Bando (坂東 梢, Bandō Kozue)
- Shunsuke Daito - Taniguchi
- Honami Tajima - Misa Inoue (井上 美咲, Inoue Misa)
- Akiko - Nami (佐伯 奈美, Nami)
- Tomu Suetaka - Kondo (近藤 利晃(ボケ担当), Kondō)

=== Staff ===
- Hitoshi Iwamoto and Norika Sakuma - directors
- Hidehiro Kawano - producer
- Izumi Kizara - screenwriter

== Episodes ==
	Episode title	Romanized title	Broadcast date	Ratings
Ep. 1	いじめられっこ転校生を人気者に	Ijimerarekko Tenkousei o Ninkimono ni	15 October 2005	16.1%
Ep. 2	(秘)キレイ大作戦	Kirei Daisakusen	22 October 2005	14.9%
Ep. 3	恐怖の文化祭	Kyoufu no Bunkasai	29 October 2005	17.0%
Ep. 4	恋の告白作戦	Koi no Kokuhaku Sakusen	5 November 2005	16.4%
Ep. 5	悪夢のデート	Akumu no Deto	12 November 2005	17.1%
Ep. 6	親と子の青春	Oya to Ko no Seishun	19 November 2005	17.7%
Ep. 7	女を泣かす男	Onna o Nakasu Otoko	26 November 2005	16.7%
Ep. 8	いじめの正体	Ijime no Shoutai	3 December 2005	18.0%
Ep. 9	別れても友達	Wakarete mo Tomodachi	10 December 2005	16.8%
Ep. 10	さようならアミーゴ	Sayōnara Amigo	17 December 2005	18.2%

== Accolades ==
The Television Drama Academy Awards are held quarterly by the magazine, "The Television", and are based on the combined results of votes from the magazine readers, juries, and TV journalists.

Year	Award	Category	Result	Recipient
2006	9th Nikkan Sports Drama Grand Prix	Best Actor	Won	Yamashita Tomohisa
2006	47th Television Drama Academy Awards	Best Drama	Won	Nobuta wo Produce
2006	47th Television Drama Academy Awards	Best Actor	Won	Kamenashi Kazuya
2006	47th Television Drama Academy Awards	Best Supporting Actress	Won	Maki Horikita
2006	47th Television Drama Academy Awards	Best Director	Won	Iwamoto Hitoshi
2006	47th Television Drama Academy Awards	Best Scriptwriter	Won	Kizara Izumi
2006	47th Television Drama Academy Awards	Best Musical Arrangement	Won	Ike Yoshihiro

== Music ==
The theme song is "Seishun Amigo" by Shūji to Akira, a special group consisting of KAT-TUN's Kazuya Kamenashi and NewS' Tomohisa Yamashita, named after their drama counterparts. The song topped the Oricon charts in 2005, selling over 1 million copies and climbing to the top as the most successful single of the year.
