= Honami Tajima =

Japanese actress

Honami Tajima (田島 穂奈美, Tajima Honami, born November 8, 1988 in Tokyo, Japan) is a Japanese actress.

== Regular roles ==
| Year | Show (Japanese/Romaji) | Role | Produced By |
|---|---|---|---|
| 1994 | 陽のあたる場所; Hi no ataru basho | 愛 Ai | Fuji Television |
| 1994 | ママのベッドへいらっしゃい; Mama no beddo e irasshai | 新井明日香; Arai Asuka (Episodes 4-10) | TV Asahi |
| 1996 | Age 35 恋しくて; Age 35 Koi Shikute | 島田まどか; Tajima Madoka | Fuji Television |
| 1996 | 続・星の金貨; Hoshi no Kinka | 牧野のぞみ; Makino Nozumi | Nippon Television |
| 2000 | 平成夫婦茶碗～ドケチの花道～ Heisei fuufu chawan ~ dokechi no kadou ~ | 金本幸; Kanamoto Miyuki | Nippon Television |
| 2000 | 平成夫婦茶碗外伝 成田家の人々; Heisei fuufu chawan gaiden: Narita ka no hitobito | 金本幸; Kanamoto Miyuki | Nippon Television |
| 2002 | 続・平成夫婦茶碗; Heisei fuufu chawan | 金本幸; Kanamoto Miyuki | Nippon Television |
| 2002 | 太陽と雪のかけら; Taiyou to yuki no kakera | 高階愛子; Takashina Aiko | Tokyo Broadcasting System |
| 2004 | 牡丹と薔薇; Botan to Bara | 三上ぼたん; Mitsumi Botan (Episodes 10-18) | Tokai Television Broadcasting |
| 2005 | ファイト; Faito | 東野栞; Higashino Shiori | NHK |
| 2005 | 野ブタ。をプロデュース; Nobuta wo Prodyuusu | 井上美咲; Inoue Misaki | Nippon Television |
