= Code Blue (TV series) =

Japanese television series

- Kanji: コード・ブルードクターヘリ緊急救命
- Genre: Medical drama
- Starring: Tomohisa Yamashita; Yui Aragaki; Erika Toda; Yōsuke Asari; Manami Higa
- Ending theme: "Hanabi" by Mr. Children
- Composer: Naoki Satō
- Country of origin: Japan
- Original language: Japanese
- No. of series: 3
- No. of episodes: 32 + 2special+ movie

Production
- Running time: 54 min./episode

Original release
- Network: Fuji TV
- Release: 2008 – 2018

Code Blue (コード・ブルー -ドクターヘリ緊急救命-, Kōdo Burū: Dokutā Heri Kinkyū Kyūmei) is a Japanese television drama broadcast by Fuji TV. Season 1 ran in 2008 and season 2 ran in 2010. Season 3 began airing in July 2017. A movie was released in 2018. The theme song is Hanabi by Mr.Children.

== Synopsis ==
=== Season 1 ===
The "Doctor Helicopter" system was legalized in Japan in June 2007. A medical team is dispatched to the patients on a helicopter to provide medical care in the field as soon as possible. Four young physicians are assigned to this latest medical system as "fellows". At the start of their "fellowship", they experience traumatic medical situations, deal with personal ambitions, witness the fragility of life, and they grow personally and professionally.

=== Special ===
After their suspension from the tunnel incident, the four "fellows": Aizawa, Shiraishi, Hiyama, Fujikawa together with nurse Saejima, are back on Shohoku's Emergency Medical Services. But as soon as they return, Kuroda suddenly hands in his resignation. Meanwhile, a train in Chiba meets a major accident.

=== Season 2 ===
"Doctor Helicopter" candidate Kōsaku Aizawa (Tomohisa Yamashita) does his best in the medical care spot. This season takes place in the winter, starting on Christmas Eve where the doctors spend their holiday on lifesaving. The appearance of Keisuke Tachibana (Kippei Shiina) who shares a past with Kanna Mitsui (Ryō) seems to pose a threat to whether the interns will last through their last year of "fellowship".

=== Season 3 ===
The main story takes place 7 years after Season 2. This season sees our familiar four doctors as seniors passing on their knowledge to the new generation, with the appearance of three fellows: Natori Soma (Daiki Arioka), Yokomine Akari (Yuko Araki), and Haitani Shunpei (Narita Ryo). Saejima and Fujikawa seems to have taken their relationship to another step, while Saejima is enjoying her fulfilling role as the head nurse and the only flight nurse. However, just as Shohoku's Emergency Medical Services faces a shortage of manpower, Kanna Mitsui requests for temporary retirement, although Aizawa has just returned.

=== The Movie ===
Code Blue: The Movie starts with the marriage talk of Saejima and Fujikawa. And talks of Aizawa and Hiyama leaving lifesaving. Meanwhile a major ferry accident takes place.

== Cast ==
- Tomohisa Yamashita as Kōsaku Aizawa
- Yui Aragaki as Megumi Shiraishi
- Erika Toda as Mihoko Hiyama
- Yōsuke Asari as Kazuo Fujikawa
- Kiyoshi Kodama as Yoshiaki Tadokoro (Emergency Unit Chief, special appearance)
- Manami Higa as Haruka Saejima (nurse)
- Toshirō Yanagiba as Shūji Kuroda (flight doctor)
- Masanobu Katsumura as Tadashi Morimoto (flight doctor)
- Ryō as Kanna Mitsui (flight doctor)
- Kippei Shiina as Keisuke Tachibana (flight doctor)
- Susumu Terajima as Hisashi Kaji (pilot)
- Tetta Sugimoto as Akira Saijo (brain surgeon)
- Daiki Arioka as Soma Natori
- Yuko Araki as Akari Yokomine
- Ryo Narita as Shunpei Haitani
- Fumika Baba as Futaba Yukimura

== International broadcast ==
Code Blue Season 3 premiered on July 23, 2017 on WakuWaku Japan in Singapore, Sri Lanka, Myanmar, Indonesia, Taiwan and Mongolia.

== Box office ==
Code Blue: The Movie grossed ¥9.3 billion in Japan, becoming the highest-grossing domestic film of 2018 and the second highest-grossing film in Japan that year (after Bohemian Rhapsody). Code Blue is also one of the top 50 highest-grossing films of all time in Japan, as of 2020.

== Awards and nominations ==
Year	Award	Category	Result	Recipient
2010	64th Television Drama Academy Awards	Best Drama	Won	Code Blue 2
2010	TV Navi Drama Awards	Best Drama	Won	Code Blue 2
2010	TV Navi Drama Awards	Best Actor	Won	Tomohisa Yamashita
2010	TV Navi Drama Awards	Best Supporting Actress	Won	Yui Aragaki
