= Tomohisa Yamashita =

Japanese singer, actor, and TV host (born 1985)

- 山下 智久
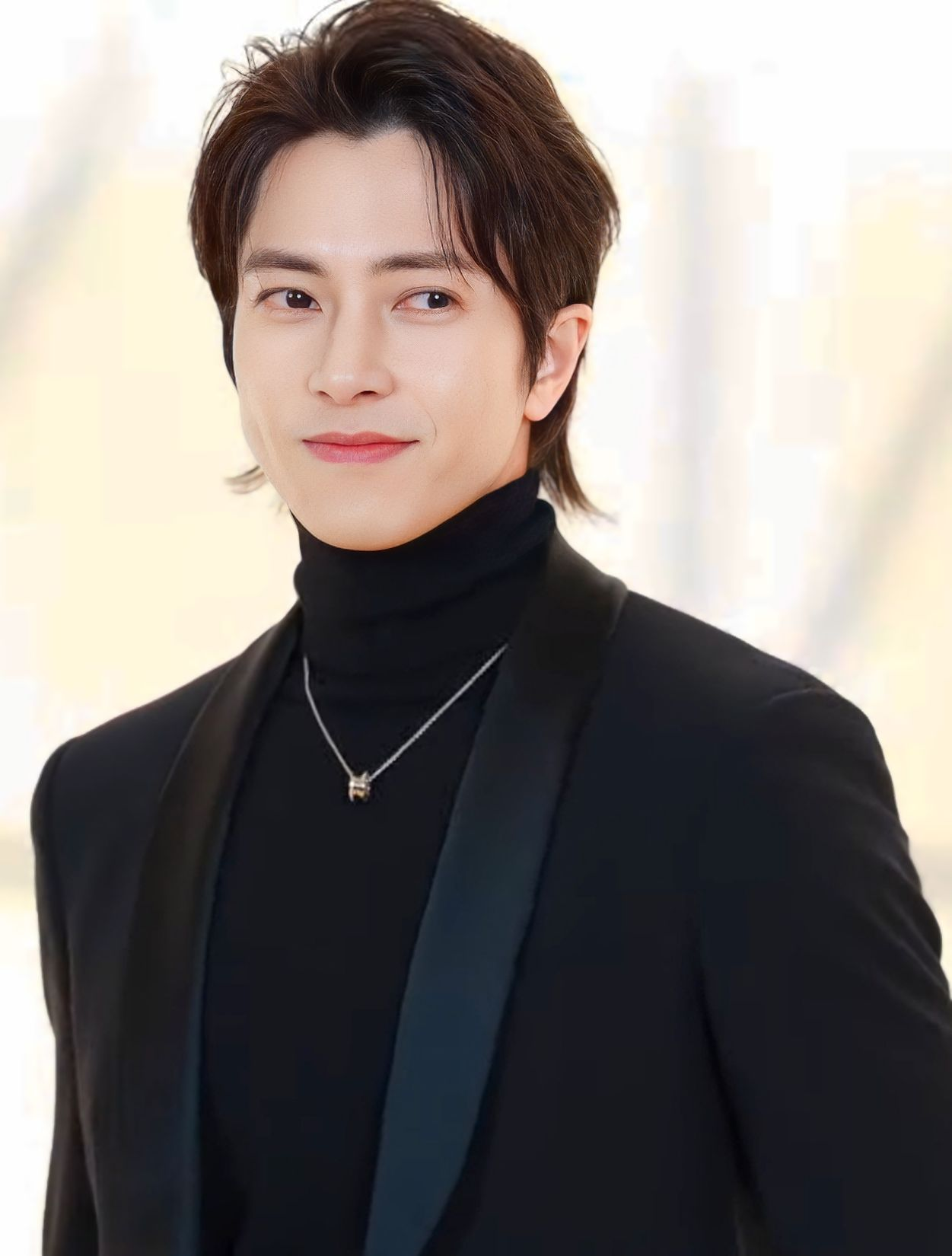
- Yamashita in March 2024
- Born: April 9, 1985 (age 41); Funabashi, Chiba, Japan
- Other names: Tomo, Yamapi, YamaP
- Education: Horikoshi High School
- Alma mater: Meiji University (BCom)
- Occupations: Singer; actor; radio host; TV presenter
- Years active: 1998–present
- Musical career
- Genre: J-pop
- Instrument: Vocals
- Years active: 1996–present
- Label: WMG Japan (2012–2016); SME Japan (2018–2020); Label9 (2021–present)
- Formerly of: B.I.G; 4Tops; NEWS
- Website: tomohisayamashita.com

Tomohisa Yamashita (Japanese: 山下 智久, Hepburn: Yamashita Tomohisa; born April 9, 1985), also widely known as Yamapi (山P, YamaP), or Tomo, is a Japanese singer, actor, and TV host.

Yamashita joined the Japanese talent agency Johnny & Associates as a trainee in 1996 and made his small acting debut for NHK's Shonentachi (1998). He made his musical debut as part of idol group NEWS in 2004 and later debuted as a soloist in 2006. He launched his acting career after portraying Kusano Akira in the hit drama Nobuta Wo Produce (2005). His first major role was in 2006 when he landed the title role in Kurosagi. In October 2011, Johnny & Associates announced that Yamashita would no longer be a member of NEWS, and he would be concentrating on his solo projects as an actor and solo singer. He released his solo music under Warner Music Japan until 2016. In mid-2018, Yamashita began releasing music under Sony Music Japan; however, Johnny & Associates continued to manage the rest of his activities, though he left the agency in October 2020. As early as 2019, he signed a brokerage contract with Westbrook Entertainment, a brokerage company opened by Will Smith, to reach global audiences.

Yamashita is widely known for his many popular dramas such as Nobuta wo Produce (2005), Kurosagi (2006), Operation Love (2007), Buzzer Beat (2009), Code Blue, and 5→9 From Five to Nine (2015). His latest movie Code Blue: The Movie (2018) was the highest-grossing domestic movie in Japan that year and ranked 5th for all-time highest-grossing live action movies in Japan. In 2023, he began starring in the French-Japanese drama series Drops of God on Apple TV.

== Early life ==
Yamashita was born as Tomohisa Aoki in Funabashi, Chiba. His parents separated when he was a child, and both Yamashita and his younger sister were raised mainly by his mother. After his father left the family, he changed his surname to his mother's. His mother's name is Naomi and his sister's name is Rina. His nickname when he was young was 'Yama'. He has been noted as an athletic person ever since he was young. When in kindergarten, he began learning karate, achieving the rank of purple belt.

Yamashita became motivated to send in his application to the talent agency Johnny & Associates after watching one of Takizawa Hideaki's dramas and aspiring to appear on television like him. He sent in applications to many agencies but only Johnny & Associates called him for an audition. In 1996, he became a trainee under Johnny & Associates as a part of group Johnny's Junior. He debuted as a singer in a then eight-member Japanese band called NEWS and as a soloist in 2006. In 1998, he later debuted as an actor with a small role in 'NHK's Shonentachi'. Since debuting, he is widely known as 'Yamapi', short for Yamashita and Pink. The nickname "Yamapi" was given to him by Takizawa Hideaki as he forgot to wear pink clothing for a performance one time and was repeatedly scolded by his coach, "Yamashita, Pink!", "Yamashita, Pink!", much to everybody's amusement. His other nicknames include 'Pi', 'Tomo-chan','Pi-Chan' or 'Pii-Tan'.

Yamashita graduated from Horikoshi Gakuen's performing arts course for high school students in 2004. In Junior High, he joined athletes club. At Horikoshi, he shared a classroom with celebrities such as Koki Tanaka, Koike Teppei, and Yu Shirota. After graduating from high school, Yamashita was accepted into Meiji University's School of Commerce. He graduated with a Commerce degree (major in marketing) in autumn 2008.

== Career ==
=== Acting ===
==== 1998–2009: Early work ====
Yamashita made his acting debut in the acclaimed NHK drama series "Shonentachi" (the Youth) (also starring Takaya Kamikawa, Sayaka Yoshino, Aiba Masaki among others) in 1998. He gained further attention after appearing in Ikebukuro West Gate Park in 2000, with his breakthrough as an actor occurring in 2006, cast in the lead role of the television drama Kurosagi. He subsequently made his film / widescreen debut with the Kurosagi film sequel Eiga: Kurosagi in 2008. Yamashita also made his debut as a solo artist with the Kurosagi soundtrack Daite Senorita which went on to sell over 800,000 copies. He followed that up in 2007 and 2008 with roles as time-traveler Iwase Ken in the award-winning romantic comedy Proposal Daisakusen and flight doctor-in-training Aizawa Kousaku in the medical drama Code Blue. Proposal Daisakusen remains one of his most notable works, and in 2013, his character Ken's trademark line "Hallelujah chance! (ハレルヤチャンス!)" was selected by Oricon Monitor Research members as one of the most memorable signature phrases in Japanese drama history. Industry watchdog Nikkei Entertainment placed him at the top of their annual ranking of under-30 Japanese celebrities in 2008 due to his achievements in multiple entertainment fields that year. Following his work in the 2009 romance serial Buzzer Beat, Nikkei christened him the 'twenty-something ratings man', singling him out as one of the few young actors who could successfully lead romance dramas and possessed a stable ratings record despite the declining drama industry. Yamashita reprised his role as Aizawa Kousaku in the winter 2010 TV series Code Blue 2. Days after Code Blue 2 wrapped, Yamashita began filming for the live-action film adaptation of Ashita no Joe. Code Blue 2 and Buzzer Beat aired in Fuji TV's prestigious getsuku (Monday 9 p.m.) time-slot in Japan, making Yamashita the first person to have starred in two getsukus with only a single drama season in between.

==== 2010–2019: Leading roles and hosting ====
From January to March 2012, NTV aired Yamashita Tomohisa Route 66: Tatta Hitori no America (山下智久・ルート６６～たったひとりのアメリカ), a travel documentary chronicling Yamashita's cross-country trip across the historic Route 66. Then, after a two-year absence, Yamashita returned to the small screen with the 2012 winter drama Saikō no Jinsei no Owarikata: Ending Planner where he portrayed the role of Ihara Masato, the reluctant heir to a funeral parlor. He also co-starred with Shingo Katori for autumn 2012 detective series Monsters.

Yamashita co-hosted Fuji TV's primetime Japanese variety show Shogeki! Sansedai Hikaku TV: Generation Tengoku (衝撃!3世代比較TV ジェネレーション天国) from January 28, 2013, until its last episode on March 10, 2014. From April 20, 2014, Yamashita started hosting a new late-night variety show titled Otona no Kiss Eigo. Later in 2015 the staffs put his name on the title show and changed to YamaPi no Kiss Eigo, with new timeslot and new format games involving speaking English. In the same year, he started a new regular radio program titled “SOUND TRIPPER“ after his old radio program "CROSS SPACE" (2012–2015) ended few weeks before. In line with the new show's title, the interFM show presented chart-topping songs from US and UK charts of that year and was broadcast five days a week, from 8:05-8:10 in the morning. The radio program was aired from 2015 to early 2017

In 2014, Yamashita was cast as the male lead in the live action film adaption of the manga Kinkyori Ren'ai (近キョリ恋愛, "Close-range Love"), in which he plays an English teacher at a high school who becomes the object of affection of his student Kururugi Uni, played by Komatsu Nana. "近キョリ恋愛" topped the Japanese box office for three consecutive weeks, earning a total 1.17 billion yen. It was the only movie with less than 200 screens (179 screens) which managed to earn over 1 billion yen in 2014.

In 2015, Yamashita starred in two drama series. The first was the TBS spring 2015 drama, "アルジャーノンに花束を" Algernon ni Hanataba wo (2015), an adaptation of the Daniel Keyes novel, Flowers for Algernon., in which he played the lead character. In fall, he starred in the romance-comedy drama 5-ji Kara 9-ji Made: Watashi ni Koi Shita Obōsan alongside actress Satomi Ishihara.

In May 2016, Yamashita starred in Takashi Miike's TerraFormars, an adaptation of the popular manga with same title, Terra Formars. In early 2016, it was also announced that Yamashita would participate in a Chinese movie production, "ReBorn" (Chinese title) or "Cyber Mission" (Japanese title), in which he played his first villain character. He costarred alongside Chinese actor Hangeng and Taiwanese actor Rydian Vaughan. The movie was released on August 3, 2018 in China and January 25, 2019 in Japan In April 2017, Yamashita and Kamenashi Kazuya starred together again in the spring drama "Boku, Unmei no Hito desu ~ I'm your Destiny" . Yamashita played the role of a mysterious man who referred to himself as "God".

9 years after the first season, Yamashita reunited with the main cast of Code Blue for a third season which aired from July to September 2017. Repeating the success of season 1 and season 2, Code Blue Season 3 ended successfully as the highest-rated drama in summer, dominating Nikkan Sport Drama Awards, Academy Drama awards and some magazine drama awards. The Code Blue series finished with Code Blue the movie, released July 27, 2018. It topped the summer box office and live action movie rankings, and at the end of the year, took the crown as the highest-grossing movie in 2018 with more than 7.17 million tickets sold and 9.23 billion yen at the box office. Code Blue is the fifth domestic live-action movie to achieve this as well as the first in fifteen years to do so; the previous film to accomplish this was Bayside Shakedown 2 in 2003.

==== 2019–present: International roles ====
In 2019, he starred in the spring drama series In Hand as genius and eccentric parasitologist Tetsu Himokura, the drama involving science research and its mystery. Since 2019, Yamashita is pursuing his acting career in international projects. Most notably, he starred as a lead actor in the psychological thriller series The Head, an international production of THE MEDIAPRO STUDIO and HBO Asia. As of November 2020, Yamashita will pursue his acting career and has his eyes set on more international roles. In 2021, he starred in the Hollywood production The Man from Toronto alongside Kevin Hart and Woody Harrelson. In 2022, Yamashita appeared as Akira in HBO Max's Tokyo Vice alongside Ken Watanabe and Hideaki Itō. In 2023, Yamashita starred as brilliant oenologist Issei Tomine in the live-action adaptation of legendary manga Drops of God for Hulu Japan and Apple TV+.

=== Music ===
==== 1996–2002: Debut with Johnny and Associates ====
Yamashita joined Johnny & Associates in 1996 at age 11. He started as trainee in a group called "Johnny's Junior". Johnny's Juniors appeared on music shows as their senior's backup dancers, in addition to appearing on NHK TV's "Shounen Club". Several years after entering the agency, Yamashita became one of the most popular junior members. After Takizawa Hideaki debuted as duo group Tackey & Tsubasa in 2003, Yamashita was appointed as Johnny's Junior leader.

==== 2003–2008: Member of NEWS ====
In September 2003, 7 years after joining the agency, Yamashita was one of the Johnny's Juniors chosen to be part of the idol group NEWS and he subsequently formally debuted on May 12, 2004. Yamashita was often referred to as the leader of NEWS in media but members of the group, including Yamashita himself, have stated at times that he was not the de facto leader.

Together with Kazuya Kamenashi, Yamashita released the single Seishun Amigo in November 2005. The single was the soundtrack for the drama Nobuta wo Produce, starring Kamenashi and Yamashita, and it topped the Oricon yearly charts in 2005. Seishun Amigo eventually sold over 1.5 million copies and is Yamashita's best-selling single to date.

==== 2009–2013: Solo work with singles ====
In 2009 Yamashita returned to solo music activities with the release of his second solo single, "Loveless", and his first solo concert, ~Short But Sweet~ In 2010, he released his third solo single One in a Million which debuted atop the Oricon charts. This was followed by the releases of the single Hadakanbo and his first solo album, Supergood, Superbad, in January 2011. His first solo tour, "Supergood, Superbad: Asia Tour 2011" kicked off on January 29, 2011, in Hong Kong.

On October 7, 2011, Johnny & Associates announced that Yamashita and Ryo Nishikido were no longer members of NEWS, and Yamashita would henceforth be concentrating on his solo projects. Yamashita later published a message through the Johnny's web (Jweb) subscription service stating that this was a decision taken after much consideration on his part.

A chance meeting at a Lady Gaga concert before production began for the 2012 drama Monsters led Katori and Yamashita to co-author the drama theme song and formed a temporary unit named "The Monsters" to release the song as a single that would later top the Oricon weekly ranking. The Monsters came together again in 2013 to co-author the track PAri-PArA for Yamashita's third album A NUDE. As of 2013, all three studio albums released by Yamashita received the RIAJ (Recording Industry Association of Japan)'s Gold certification, indicating a shipment of 100,000 copies.

==== 2014–present: Solo albums and tours ====
In 2014, Yamashita released two original albums: his fourth studio album, titled "YOU", and, later, a limited release of the dance mini-album titled "Asobi". After a two-year hiatus, Yamashita returned to music in January 2016. He released his first best-of album YAMA-P including previously released songs and the original song "Dreamer". The album reached #1 on the Oricon chart that week.

From June to August 2016, Yamashita returned with a nationwide concert tour entitled "Yamashita Tomohisa~The Best Live Tour 2016 Future Fantasy", his first concert tour since 2013's "A NUDE". Due to high demand from his fans, he added additional shows for Future Fantasy Yoyogi Arena in December, 2016

In April 2017, Yamashita and Kamenashi Kazuya reunited again after 12 years, naming their 2017 unit "Kame to Yamapi" and releasing "Senaka Goshi No Chance", the title song to their drama "Boku, Unmei no Hito desu ~ I'm your Destiny". The single topped the Oricon weekly charts and sold more than 160,000 copies. Again, they performed on music shows and participated in yearly music festivals. Similar to Shuji to Akira's Seishun Amigo, Senaka Goshi No Chance proved popular for its dance.

In mid-2018, Johnny & Associates announced that Sony Music Japan (SME Japan) would act as Yamashita's new music label and his comeback to his music career after 4 years without any major release. His first SME release, "UNLEASHED", was released November 28, 2018, containing songs mostly written and produced by himself; he wrote 11 of the album's 12 tracks. He also conducted nationwide concert tours from September through December 2018. Although Sony Music Japan serves as Yamashita's new music label since then, his main career management remained under Johnny & Associates until October 31, 2020.

Yamashita was chosen to sing the opening song for the popular anime series "Ace Attorney, season 2". The song, called "Never Lose", was released February 13, 2019. On June 19, 2019, Yamashita's new single "Change" was released, the title song to his new drama In Hand which he had composed and written.

On November 11, 2020, Johnny & Associates announced that Yamashita has left Johnny & Associates on October 31. On his Instagram account, Yamashita stated that he wants to chase his childhood dreams.

== Public image ==
In July 2020, Tomohisa was announced as one of the guest speakers for the 2020 Tomorrowland Around the World Inspiration Sessions Festival. He was one of 16 guest speakers as an international role model. In March 2021, Yamashita was officially announced as a Bulgari ambassador. In May 2021, Yamashita was officially announced as a beauty ambassador for Dior. In August 2023, Yamashita was officially announced as "Friends of the House" of Moët & Chandon

In 2020, his activities were temporarily suspended when he was seen drinking with a group of women that included one underaged woman (17 years old; legal drinking age is 20). He was later seen at the same hotel with the girl.

== Discography ==
=== Studio albums ===
Title	Album details	Peak chart positions		Sales	Certifications
Title	Album details	JPN	KOR	Sales	Certifications
Supergood, Superbad	Released: January 26, 2011; Label: Johnny's Entertainment	1	23	JPN: 135,404; KOR: 2,291	RIAJ: Gold
Ero (エロ)	Released: July 25, 2012; Label: Warner Music Japan	2	—	JPN: 95,277	RIAJ: Gold
A Nude	Released: September 11, 2013; Label: Warner Music Japan	2	—	JPN: 75,168	RIAJ: Gold
You	Released: October 8, 2014; Label: Warner Music Japan	1	—	JPN: 52,837	
Unleashed	Released: November 28, 2018; Label: Sony Music Entertainment Japan	1	—	JPN: 93,777	RIAJ: Gold
Sweet Vision	Released: July 19, 2023; Label: Label9	4	—	JPN: 27,654	

=== Compilation albums ===
Title	Album details	Peak chart positions	Sales
Title	Album details	JPN	Sales
YAMA-P	Released: January 27, 2016; Label: Warner Music Japan	1	JPN: 58,896

=== Extended plays ===
Title	Album details	Peak chart positions	Sales
Title	Album details	JPN	Sales
Asobi (遊)	Released: January 27, 2016; Label: Warner Music Japan	2	JPN: 27,000

=== Singles ===
Title	Year	Peak chart positions		Sales	Certifications	Album
Title	Year	JPN	JPN Hot	Sales	Certifications	Album
"Daite Señorita" (抱いてセニョリータ)	2006	1	—	JPN: 800,000	RIAJ: 2× Platinum	Supergood, Superbad
"Loveless"	2009	1	1	JPN: 270,479	RIAJ: Platinum	Supergood, Superbad
"One in a million"	2010	1	1	JPN: 204,561	RIAJ: Platinum	Supergood, Superbad
"Hadakanbō" (はだかんぼー)	2011	1	2	JPN: 85,357	RIAJ: Gold	Supergood, Superbad
"Love, Texas" (愛, テキサス)	2012	1	1	JPN: 168,315	RIAJ: Gold	Ero
"Love Chase"	2012	2	1	JPN: 140,882	RIAJ: Gold	YAMA-P
"Que Sera Sera" (怪・セラ・セラ)	2013	2	1	JPN: 112,138	RIAJ: Gold	A Nude
"Summer Nude '13"	2013	1	1	JPN: 130,870	RIAJ: Gold	YAMA-P
"Reason/Never Lose"	2019	2	4 (Note: "Reason" charted at number 4, while "Never Lose" charted at number 100 on the Billboard Japan Hot 100.)			Non-album singles
"Change"	2019	1	1		RIAJ: Gold	Non-album singles
"Nights Cold"	2020	1	5		RIAJ: Gold	Non-album singles
"Beautiful World"	2021	— (Note: "Beautiful World" did not enter the Oricon Singles Chart, but it peaked at number 9 on the Oricon Digital Singles Chart.)	72			Non-album singles
"Face to Face"	2022	2	13			Non-album singles
"Forever In My Heart"	2022	— (Note: "Forever In My Heart" did not enter the Oricon Singles Chart, but it peaked at number 20 on the Oricon Digital Singles Chart.)	—			Non-album singles

=== Collaborations and features ===
Title	Year	Peak chart positions		Certifications	Album
Title	Year	JPN	JPN Hot	Certifications	Album
"Home Party!" (Hideaki Takizawa feat. Tomohisa Yamashita, Shingo Murakami, and You Yokoyama)	2009	—	—		"Ai・Kakumei" (愛・革命) (single album)
"Unusual" (Namie Amuro feat. Tomohisa Yamashita)	2011	—	—		Checkmate!
"Monsters" (released as The Monsters with Shingo Katori)	2012	1	1	RIAJ: Gold	"Monsters" (single album)

=== Video releases ===
Title	Video details	Peak chart positions	
Title	Video details	JPN DVD	JPN Blu-ray
Tomohisa Yamashita Asia Tour 2011: Super Good Super Bad	Released: December 21, 2011; Label: Johnny's Entertainment; Formats: DVD, Blu-ray	3	13
Tomohisa Yamashita Route 66: Tatta Hitori no America (山下智久・ルート66〜たった一人のアメリカ〜)	Released: April 11, 2012; Label: VAP; Formats: DVD, Blu-ray	4	4
Tomohisa Yamashita Live Tour 2012 ~EroP~	Released: December 12, 2012; Label: Warner Music Japan; Formats: DVD, Blu-ray	1	3
Tomohisa Yamashita Tour 2013: A Nude	Released: September 3, 2014; Label: Warner Music Japan; Formats: DVD, Blu-ray	1	4
Tomohisa Yamashita in LA -Document of "Your Step"–Complete Version	Released: May 20, 2015; Label: Warner Music Japan; Formats: DVD	1	—
Tomohisa Yamashita- Live Tour 2018 Unleashed –Feel the Love–	Released: May 22, 2019; Label: Sony Music Entertainment Japan; Formats: DVD, Blu-ray	1	2

=== Composing and song-writing ===
Year	Song	Credits	CD/DVD (Artist)
2003	Love Song	Composer/lyricist	Touch (NEWS)
2004	Yubiwa	Composer/lyricist	Daite Senorita (Tomohisa Yamashita)
2004	Time	Lyricist	N/A (Performed on Shounen Club, May 9, 2004)
2004	Pain	Lyricist	NEWS Nippon 0304 (NEWS)
2005	Color	Lyricist	Seishun Amigo (Shuuji to Akira)
2005	Ashita E	Composer/lyricist	N/A (Performed on Shounen Club, December 11, 2005)
2006	Houkago Blues	Composer/lyricist	Fever to Future (GYM)
2006	Let Me	Composer/lyricist	N/A (Performed on Shounen Club, March 5, 2006)
2006	Co-Road	Lyricist	N/A (Performed at NEWS Spring Concerts, April 2006)
2007	Gomen ne Juliet	Composer/lyricist	Pacific (NEWS)
2007	Fight All Night	Co-Lyricist (Rap)	cartoon KAT-TUN II You (KAT-TUN)
2007	Snow Express	Lyricist (Rap)	color (NEWS)
2007	Kiss de Tsutaete	Composer/lyricist	N/A (Performed on Shounen Club, February 4, 2007)
2009	Moonlight	Lyricist	Loveless (Tomohisa Yamashita)
2009	Ginza Rhapsody	Co-Lyricist	NEWS Live Diamond (NEWS)
2010	World is Yours	Composer/lyricist	One in a million (Tomohisa Yamashita)
2010	Share	Co-Composer/lyricist (as NEWS)	Live (NEWS)
2011	Ao	Composer/lyricist	Supergood, Superbad (Tomohisa Yamashita)
2011	Friday Night	Lyricist	Supergood, Superbad (Tomohisa Yamashita)
2011	Party Don't Stop	Co-Lyricist	Supergood, Superbad (Tomohisa Yamashita)
2011	Tomo	Co-Lyricist	Supergood, Superbad (Tomohisa Yamashita)
2011	Dreamer	Lyricist	YAMA-P Best Album
2012	Hit The Wall	Co-Composer/lyricist/arranger	Ero (Tomohisa Yamashita)
2012	Odoru Yoru	Co-Composer/lyricist/arranger	Ero (Tomohisa Yamashita)
2012	Kimi to Kaze to Mikazuki	Composer/lyricist	Love Chase (Tomohisa Yamashita)
2012	Monsters	Co-Composer/lyricist (as The Monsters)	Monsters (The Monsters)
2013	Natsu no Orion	Composer/lyricist	A Nude (Tomohisa Yamashita)
2013	PAri-PArA	Co-Composer/lyricist (as The Monsters)	A Nude (Tomohisa Yamashita)
2013	Ain't Enough	Co-Composer/lyricist	#JUSTJIN (Jin Akanishi)
2014	Moon Disco	Lyricist	Asobi (Tomohisa Yamashita)
2014	Brodiaea	Lyricist	You (Tomohisa Yamashita)
2017	Forever Summer	Co-Composer/lyricist	Senaka goshi no Chance (Kame to Yamapi)
2017	Bird	Lyricist	Senaka goshi no Chance (Kame to Yamapi)
2018	UNLEASHED Full album (12 songs)	Composer/Co-Composer/Lyricist/Arranger	UNLEASHED (Yamashita Tomohisa)
2019	Reason	Composer/Co-Composer/Lyricist/Arranger	Reason/Never Lose (Yamashita Tomohisa)
2019	Never Lose	Composer/Co-Composer/Lyricist/Arranger	Reason/Never Lose (Yamashita Tomohisa)
2019	Without You	Composer/Co-Composer/Lyricist/Arranger	Reason/Never Lose (Yamashita Tomohisa)
2019	Like a Movie	Composer/Co-Composer/Lyricist/Arranger	Reason/Never Lose (Yamashita Tomohisa)
2019	Change	Composer/Lyricist/Arranger	Change (Yamashita Tomohisa)
2024	Anthem	Lyricist/producer	timelesz (timelesz)

== Concerts ==
Year	Title	Description
2009	Short but Sweet	Info: First solo concert, remained as a member of NEWS; Number of shows: 5; Place: Yokohama Arena, Tokyo; Attendees: 75,000
2011	Asia Tour 2011 Super Good Super Bad	Info: Second solo concert, remained as a member of NEWS; 29 January – 29 May; Place: Hong Kong, Korea, Taiwan, Thailand and Japan; Attendees: 236,000
2012	Ero P national Arena tour	Info: First concert, as a soloist; 28 July – 29 August; Number of shows: 11; Attendees: 139,000
2013	A Nude national Hall & Arena tour	Info: Second concert, as a soloist; 5 October – 19 December; Number of shows: 29 at 20 locations; Attendees: 135,000
2016	Future Fantasy National Hall Tour	Info: 3rd concert, as a soloist; 9 Juny – 31 August; Number of shows: 28 shows at 14 locations; Attendees:
2016	Future Fantasy in YOYOGI (Arena concert)	Info: 3rd concert, as a soloist; Additional concert for Future Fantasy; 3-4 December; Number of shows: 3 shows; Attendees: 45.000
2018	UNLEASHED ~ Feel the love~	Info: 4th concert as a solo artist; 21 September – 9 December 2018

== Filmography ==
=== Television drama ===
Year	English title	Role	Notes	Ref.
1998	Shōnentachi	Kakuda Shinya	Miniseries	
1999	Nekketsu Renaidō		Episode 7	
1999	P.P.O.I	Taira Amano	Lead role; miniseries	
1999	Kowai Nichiyōbi		Episode 13	
1999	Kiken na Kankei	Satoshi Miyabe	Episodes 10–11	
2000	Ikebukuro West Gate Park	Shun Mizuno		
2000	Shijō Saiaku no Date	Yuki Okumura	Episode 1	
2000	All Star Chūshingura Matsuri	Asano Takumi-no-Kami	Televised stageplay	
2001	Kabachitare!	Yūta Tamura		
2001	Shounen wa Tori ni Natta	Ken Nagashima	Lead role; television film	
2002	Long Love Letter	Tadashi Otomo		
2002	The Queen of Lunchtime Cuisine	Kōshirō Nabeshima		
2003	Stand Up!!	Kengo Iwasaki		
2003	Budo no Ki	Yōsuke Shindō	Lead role; television film	
2004	Engimono 9: Kuruizaki Virgin Road	Hajime	Lead role; televised stageplay	
2004	It Was Sudden, Like a Storm…	Takuma Fukazawa		
2005	Nobuta wo Produce	Akira Kusano	Lead role	
2005–21	Dragon Sakura	Yūsuke Yajima	2 seasons	
2006	The Black Swindler	Kurosaki	Lead role	
2007	Byakkotai	Shintarō Sakai; Mineji Sakai	Lead role; miniseries	
2007	Operation Love	Ken Iwase	Lead role	
2008	Operation Love SP	Ken Iwase	Lead role; television film	
2008–17	Code Blue	Kōsaku Aizawa	Lead role; 3 seasons	
2009	Code Blue SP	Kōsaku Aizawa	Lead role; television film	
2009	Buzzer Beat	Naoki Kamiya	Lead role	
2012	The Best Way to End a Life: Ending Planner	Masato Ihara	Lead role	
2012	Tomohisa Yamashita Route 66: Tatta Hitori no America	As himself	Serial travel show: one man show	
2012	True Horror Stories: Akai Tsume	Akiyoshi Ishida	Lead role; short drama	
2012	Monsters	Kōsuke Saionji	Lead role	
2013	Summer Nude	Mikuriya Asahi	Lead role	
2013	Kindaichi Kōsuke VS Akechi Kogorō SP1	Kōsuke Kindaichi	Lead role; television film	
2013	Dokushin Kizoku	As himself		
2014	Kindaichi Kōsuke VS Akechi Kogorō Futatabi SP2	Kōsuke Kindaichi	Lead role; television film	
2014	Close Range Love: Season Zero	Haruka Sakurai (adult)	Special appearance	
2015	Flowers for Algernon	Sakuto Shiratori	Lead role	
2015	5→9 From Five to Nine	Takane Hoshikawa		
2017	I'm Your Destiny	Mysterious Man / God / Ichiro Masaki		
2019	In Hand	Tetsu Himokura	Lead role	
2020	The Head	Kobayashi Aki	Miniseries	
2022–24	The Honest Realtor	Nagase Saichi	Lead role; 2 seasons	
2022–24	Tokyo Vice	Akira	2 seasons	
2022	Alice in Borderland	Ginji Kyuma	Season 2	
2023–26	Drops of God	Issei Tomine	Lead role; 2 seasons	
2026	Hakone Ekiden: Our Story	Masato Kai		

=== Film ===
Year	Title	Role	Notes	Ref.
1996	Shinrei	Extra	Anthology film	
2008	The Black Swindler	Kurosaki	Lead role	
2011	Tomorrow's Joe	Joe Yabuki	Lead role	
2014	Close Range Love	Haruka Sakurai	Lead role	
2016	Terraformars	Muto Jin		
2018	Code Blue The Movie	Aizawa Kousaku	Lead role	
2022	The Man from Toronto	"The Man from Tokyo"		
2023	See Hear Love	Shinji Izumimoto	Lead role	
2024	Black Noise		Lead role; Taiwanese-Japanese film	
2026	The Honest Realtor: The Movie	Saichi Nagase	Lead role	

== Awards and nominations ==
Year	Organization	Award	Work	Result	Ref.
2001	4th Nikkan Sports Drama Grand Prix	Best Newcomer	Ikebukuro West Gate Park	Won	
2006	9th Nikkan Sports Drama Grand Prix	Best Actor	Nobuta wo Produce	Won	
2016	19th Nikkan Sports Drama Grand Prix	Best Actor	Flowers for Algernon	Won	
2016	19th Nikkan Sports Drama Grand Prix	Best Supporting Actor	5→9 From Five to Nine	Won	
2025	28th Nikkan Sports Drama Grand Prix	Best Actor	Blue Moment	Won	
