= Masshiro =

- Genre: Drama
- Written by: Yumiko Inoue
- Directed by: Natsuki Imai; Toshio Tsuboi; Yūsuke Itō; Keigo Higashinaka; Shin Katō
- Starring: Maki Horikita; Yūya Yagira; Mirai Shida; Rin Takanashi; Ken Ishiguro; Miki Mizuno; Tae Kimura
- Ending theme: "Fighting Girls" by Miwa
- Composers: Masaru Yokoyama; Masato Suzuki
- Country of origin: Japan
- Original language: Japanese
- No. of episodes: 10

Production
- Producers: Hiroki Ueda; Keigo Higashinaka
- Running time: 54 minutes

Original release
- Network: TBS
- Release: January 13 – March 17, 2015

Masshiro (まっしろ; English title "Nurses of the Palace") is a Japanese soap opera series created by Yumiko Inoue. She wrote the screenplay based on her own experiences of her father being in hospital. Maki Horikita played the lead role as a nurse. It premiered on TBS on 13 January 2015, and concluded 17 March 2015, airing 10 episodes.

== Cast ==
- Maki Horikita as Akari Arimura, a nurse who wants to marry a wealthy man
- Yūya Yagira as Kōtarō Nakano, a young surgeon who studied cutting-edge medicine in the United States
- Mirai Shida as Nana Matsuoka, Arimura's nurse colleague
- Rin Takanashi as Yūko Wada, Arimura's nurse colleague
- Ken Ishiguro as Masataka Satō, a director of the Tōō hospital surgical center
- Miki Mizuno as Megumi Iwabuchi, a veteran nurse
- Tae Kimura as Shizuka Tanoshima, a head nurse

== Episodes ==
No.	Title	Directed by	Original release date	Ratings (%)
1	"玉の輿を狙う新人ナース!! この白い大奥で恋に仕事に勝つ"	Natsuki Imai	January 13, 2015	7.9
2	"口外厳禁!! 開かずの病室の秘密"	Toshio Tsuboi	January 20, 2015	7.8
3	"師長退陣!? 看護師全面戦争! 患者と禁断の恋"	Yūsuke Itō	January 27, 2015	5.7
4	"生きる! 勇気を私にくれた人"	Natsuki Imai	February 3, 2015	5.1
5	"人生最後の願いとは?"	Toshio Tsuboi	February 10, 2015	5.4
6	"元カレ妻を看護!?命をかけて守る大切なもの"	Keigo Higashinaka	February 17, 2015	5.9
7	"優しい嘘… 残酷な告知!本物の愛の選択とは"	Natsuki Imai	February 24, 2015	4.6
8	"攻めの看護20年間の覚悟!!"	Shin Katō	March 3, 2015	4.9
9	"究極の選択 救えないオペか尊厳ある死か!?"	Toshio Tsuboi	March 10, 2015	5.4
10	"哀しみの涙、瞳に宿るは希望"	Natsuki Imai	March 17, 2015	5.2

Preceded by Onna wa Sore o Yurusanai (21 October 2014 - 23 December 2014)	TBS Tuesday Dramas; Tuesdays 22:00 - 22:54 (JST)	Succeeded by Mother Game: Kanojotachi no Kaikyū (14 April 2015 - )
