= Hana-Kimi (TV series) =

2007 Japanese television drama

- Official poster

Japanese name
- Kanji: 花ざかりの君たちへ〜イケメン♂パラダイス〜
- Literal meaning: For You in Full Blossom: Ikemen Paradise
Transcriptions
- Revised Hepburn: Hanazakari no Kimitachi e: Ikemen Paradaisu
- Genre: Romantic comedy; Teen drama
- Based on: Hana-Kimi by Hisaya Nakajo
- Written by: Shogo Muto
- Directed by: Hidetomo Matsuda (ep. 1–2, 5, 8–9, 12, SP); Junichi Tsuzuki (ep. 3, 6, 11); Genta Satō (ep. 4, 7, 10)
- Starring: Maki Horikita; Shun Oguri; Toma Ikuta
- Theme music composer: Orange Range (OP); Ai Otsuka (ED)
- Opening theme: "Ikenai Taiyō" by Orange Range
- Ending theme: "Peach" by Ai Otsuka
- Composers: Shin Kono; Yu Takami
- Country of origin: Japan
- Original language: Japanese
- No. of seasons: 1
- No. of episodes: 12

Production
- Producer: Aya Moriyasu
- Running time: 54 minutes; 135 minutes (SP)
- Production companies: Fuji Television; Kyodo Television

Original release
- Network: FNS (Fuji TV)
- Release: July 3, 2007 – October 12, 2008

Related
- Hanazakarino Kimitachihe; Hanazakari no Kimitachi e (2011); To the Beautiful You

Hana-Kimi (Japanese: 花ざかりの君たちへ〜イケメン♂パラダイス〜, Hepburn: Hanazakari no Kimitachi e: Ikemen Paradaisu; lit. 'For You in Full Blossom: Ikemen Paradise', stylized as HANA-KIMI) is a teen romantic comedy Japanese television drama planned by Hiroyuki Gotō for Fuji TV and Kyodo TV, based on the shōjo manga of the same title by Hisaya Nakajo. It premiered on Fuji TV between July 3 and September 18, 2007, for twelve episodes. A television special with the regular cast reprising their roles was also subsequently produced, and premiered on October 12, 2008.

A remake of this drama with an entirely different cast was broadcast on Fuji TV during the 2011 summer season.

A new version of the series was announced for December 5, 2026, together with a stage play with this version's cast.

== Cast ==
Group	Cast	Role
Second Dormitory	Maki Horikita	Mizuki Ashiya (芦屋 瑞稀, Ashiya Mizuki)
Second Dormitory	Shun Oguri	Izumi Sano (佐野 泉, Sano Izumi)
Second Dormitory	Toma Ikuta	Shūichi Nakatsu (中津 秀一, Nakatsu Shūichi)
Second Dormitory	Hiro Mizushima	Minami Nanba (難波 南, Nanba Minami)
Second Dormitory	Yūsuke Yamamoto	Taiki Kayashima (萱島 大樹, Kayashima Taiki)
Second Dormitory	Masaki Okada	Kyōgo Sekime (関目 京悟, Sekime Kyōgo)
Second Dormitory	Ryō Kimura	Senri Nakao (中央 千里, Nakao Senri)
Second Dormitory	Junpei Mizobata	Kazuma Saga (嵯峨 和真, Saga Kazuma)
Second Dormitory	Shunji Igarashi	Shinji Noe (野江 伸二, Noe Shinji)
Second Dormitory	Hiromi Sakimoto	Arata Kyōbashi (京橋 新, Kyōbashi Arata)
Second Dormitory	Shōta Chiyo	Taichi Yodoyabashi (淀屋橋 太壱, Yodoyabashi Taichi)
Second Dormitory	Ryō Tajima	Jō Arashiyama (嵐山 譲, Arashiyama Jō)
Second Dormitory	Enoku Shimegi	Kyōichi Tannowa
Second Dormitory	Hikaru Okada	Riku Takaida
Second Dormitory	Jun Ikeda	Kamishinjō Itsuki
Second Dormitory	Kōta Suzuki	Kanata Uenoshiba
Second Dormitory	Keisuke Shibasaki	Manato Minase
Second Dormitory	Shota Matsushima	Masashi Katsura
Second Dormitory	Shotaro Mamiya	Keisuke Awaji
Second Dormitory	Goro Kurihara	Kota Hanaten
First Dormitory	Yuma Ishigaki	Tennōji Megumi
First Dormitory	Mitsuomi Takahashi	Mitsuomi Daikokuchō
First Dormitory	Kouhei Takeda	Kōhei Kitahanada
First Dormitory	Ryohei Suzuki	Sōichirō Akashi
First Dormitory	Yūichi Sato	Shōta Tezukayama
First Dormitory	Sōsuke Nishiyama	Sōma Shichidō
First Dormitory	Ryō Hayakawa	Sakyō Gotenyama
First Dormitory	Tatsuya Hagiwara	Hiroto Ishikiri
First Dormitory	Kōji Matsushita	Ren Shōjaku
First Dormitory	Kohei Takeda	Kohei Kitahanada
First Dormitory	Arata Horii	Jin Kumatori
First Dormitory	Ryosuke Yamamoto	Akira Kiyoshikojin
First Dormitory	Ryu Ando	Andrew Mukonoso
First Dormitory	Kodai Asaka	Subaru Takatsuki
First Dormitory	Sonde Kanai	Kazuki Obitoke
First Dormitory	Shotaro Kotani	Hiroto Moriguchi
First Dormitory	Tomoki Okayama	Shotaro Kadoma
Third Dormitory	Nobuo Kyo	Masao Himejima/Oscar
Third Dormitory	Keisuke Katō	Hikaru Yao
Third Dormitory	Toshihiko Watanabe	Shō Imamiya
Third Dormitory	Yūta Takahashi	Haruki Shijō
Third Dormitory	Shōichi Matsuda	Junnosuke Kuzuha
Third Dormitory	Naoki Miyata	Tsukasa Saiin
Third Dormitory	Yasuhisa Furuhara	Taiyō Ōgimachi
Third Dormitory	Naoya Ojima	Kōhei Kaizuka
Third Dormitory	Yuya Nakata	Ken Katabiranotsuji
Third Dormitory	Yū Kawakami	Genji Kōrien
Third Dormitory	Kusuto Miyajima	Nobuhiro Yaenosato
Third Dormitory	Takami Ozora	Sansui Kyobate
Third Dormitory	Taiko Katono	Hisashi Kawachimori
Third Dormitory	Shige Kasai	Yasushi Mozu
Third Dormitory	Kazuma Kawahara	Sakon Narayama
Third Dormitory	Kazuhiro Okazaki	Hideharu Izumigaoka
Third Dormitory	Kettaro	Shin Minamikata
Tōkyō High School	Yū Shirota	Makoto Kagurazaka
Tōkyō High School	Shunsuke Daito	Shin Sano
St. Blossom's High School: Hanayashiki Hibari and Hibari 4	Mayuko Iwasa	Hibari Hanayashiki
St. Blossom's High School: Hanayashiki Hibari and Hibari 4	Mirei Kiritani	Kanna Amagasaki
St. Blossom's High School: Hanayashiki Hibari and Hibari 4	Airi Taira	Erika Abeno
St. Blossom's High School: Hanayashiki Hibari and Hibari 4	Madoka Matsuda	Juri Kishinosato
St. Blossom's High School: Hanayashiki Hibari and Hibari 4	Manami Kurose	Komari Imaike
Teachers	Seiko Matsuda	Principal Tsubaki
Teachers	Takashi Ukaji	Head teacher Sawatari
Teachers	Susumu Kobayashi	Yoshioka
Teachers	Takaya Kamikawa	Hokuto Umeda
Others	Mahiru Konno	Akiha Hara
Others	Yoshinori Okada	Suzuki Ashiya
Others	Hajime Yamazaki	Takumi Ashiya
Others	Mariko Tsutsui	Eiko Ashiya
Others	Yoko Moriguchi	Io Nanba
Others	Natsuki Harada	Kanao Tanabe
Others	Tetta Sugimoto	Takehiko Sano

== Episode list ==
No.	Title	Original release date
1	"Getting into the Forbidden Boys' Dormitory"; Transliteration: "Kindan no Danshi Ryō Rotsunyū" (Japanese: 禁断の男子寮突入)	July 3, 2007
Mizuki Ashiya arrives at Ohsaka High, a school that accepts students based on appearance rather than merit. She has several awkward and embarrassing encounters with her classmates, including Izumi Sano, a high jump athlete. Sano is the reason Mizuki disguised herself and entered an all-boys school. Mizuki is introduced to the school's three dormitories that compete in school-wide events: Dorm 1, captained by Megumi Tennouji, contains the martial arts department; Dorm 2, led by Minami Nanba specializes in sports; and Dorm 3, headed by Oscar M. Himejima, hosts the performing arts. Mizuki joins Dorm 2 to be close to Sano, and even becomes his roommate, but learns that he quit high jumping because of a torn ligament. For the sake of winning a marathon competition between the dorms, some students injure Mizuki's foot, but she is determined to keep running. Sano hears of the incident and comes to watch, and when Mizuki collapses before the finish, he carries her to the nurse's office. The school's doctor Umeda discovers that she is a girl.
2	"Wrong Kiss"; Transliteration: "Ikenai Kiss" (Japanese: イケナイkiss)	July 10, 2007
Mizuki runs from Umeda's office without responding. Back at the dorms, the three dorm heads declare they will win fair and square in the next event, the Mr. Osaka contest, which will be a joint event with the girls of St. Blossoms, Ohsaka's sister academy. St. Blossoms' Hanayashiki Hibari, supported by the Hibari 4, is determined to win. During the decorating, Sano gets drunk and kisses Mizuki, which the members of dorm 2 inform her happens whenever he has even a small amount of alcohol. Meanwhile, Nakatsu Shūichi struggles with being inexplicably attracted to the "boy" Mizuki. Umeda informs Mizuki that Sano has decided to drop out of track and field. With Nakatsu trailing after her, Mizuki finds Sano arguing with rival Kagurazaka. Sano tells her later that he is afraid to return to the field; she says he should go at his own pace, as long as he doesn't give up. Mizuki confides to Umeda that in America, she was the reason Sano's leg was injured, so he decides not to expel her yet. Both Sano and Mizuki make appearances in the contest, with Mizuki in a dress. The dog Yuujiro is named King, and Mizuki is Queen.
3	"Bizarre Big Brother!"; Transliteration: "Ryōki-tekina Aniki!" (Japanese: 猟奇的なアニキ！)	July 17, 2007
Mizuki's brother comes to bring her back to the United States. He sets foot on campus in the middle of the dorm members' search for a panty thief who is terrorizing St. Blossoms and is mistaken for a suspicious person, which doesn't give him the best impression of Mizuki's classmates. Sano overhears them arguing and learns that Mizuki is a girl, as well as her involvement in his injury. When Mizuki tells Umeda about her troubles, the gay doctor decides to tease her uptight brother. Mizuki meets Umeda's ex, a photographer, and learns from her that Sano's younger brother is now a high jump star. After Mizuki's brother confronts Sano, Sano tries to chase Mizuki away. But she bounces back from his harsh words, which makes him think about her determination. He tells her brother that he couldn't take the pressure of being a record holder, but now he wants to show the same spirit Mizuki has. Nakatsu determines that he is not homo, but can't fight his feelings for Mizuki. The search for the panty thief uncovers a bra in Mizuki's luggage, endangering her secret, but Sano reveals that Yuujiro is the real thief.
4	"Dangerous 3-Person Room"; Transliteration: "Abunai 3-ri Heya" (Japanese: アブナイ3人部屋)	July 24, 2007
The students learn that Dorm 1 will be temporarily closed for maintenance, and its members will move into Dorm 2 for a few days. Nakatsu takes the place of the third person in Mizuki and Sano's room, causing chaos for them. However, Mizuki is more concerned that Sano appears to be avoiding her. When she goes to Tōkyō High School to observe Sano's brother, Shin, she witnesses a confrontation between the two and learns that Shin is angry that his brother ran away. She asks Nakatsu what might make Sano happy, and Nakatsu convinces her that Sano needs a girlfriend, so Mizuki forces Sano to attend a joint party with St. Blossoms. Sano storms out of the party and blames Mizuki for dragging him there. She is discouraged and is considering returning home to America when Nakatsu pulls her out to the track field, where Sano has been training every night. Sano informs Shin and his rival Kagurazaka that he will compete again.
5	"Hopeless Coast Story"; Transliteration: "Ikenai Kaigan Monogatari" (Japanese: イケナイ海岸物語)	July 31, 2007
Minami and his dorm-mates take Mizuki participate in some competitions against Kagurazaka Team. Tokyo High includes several competitions: "Beach flag showdown", "Gyoza-eating showdown", "intro showdown", "Sumo-wrestling showdown", "Balance showdown", and "Flirting showdown". Nakatsu's team almost lost when Minami supports them and replacing Mizuki during the showdown. After beating Nakatsu's team in the showdown, Kagurazaka Team had go home naked. During the summer training camp, Sano's teammates refuse to compete him.
6	"The Beginning of Disastrous Love"; Transliteration: "Dai Haran no Koi Hajimaru" (Japanese: 大波乱の恋始まる)	August 7, 2007
7	"Suddenly in Bed"; Transliteration: "Totsuzen no Beddo-in" (Japanese: 突然のベッドイン)	August 14, 2007
8	"I Like Mizuki"; Transliteration: "Ore wa Mizuki ga Suki" (Japanese: オレは瑞稀が好き)	August 21, 2007
9	"Exposed!"; Transliteration: "Bareta!" (Japanese: バレた！)	August 28, 2007
10	"Depend on Me!"; Transliteration: "Ore ni Shitoke yo!" (Japanese: オレにしとけよ！)	September 4, 2007
11	"I'll Jump for You"; Transliteration: "Omae no Tame ni Tobu" (Japanese: お前のために跳ぶ)	September 11, 2007
12	"We'll Protect You!"; Transliteration: "Ore-tachi ga Mamoru!" (Japanese: オレたちが守る！)	September 18, 2007

== Special ==
A television special began two years after Mizuki true gender was revealed. With Valentine's Day approaching, Sano and Nakatsu are talking about the last week of summer vacation. A flashback of the last week of summer holiday, which took place between episodes 7 and 8, was shown. Filming began on March 19, 2008. A conference was held on September 18, 2008, announcing the completion of the special, subtitled Sotsugyōshiki and Nana to Hanbunwa Special (卒業式&7と1/2話スペシャル).
