= Rumi Hiiragi =

Japanese actress

- Born: August 1, 1987 (age 38); Tokyo, Japan
- Occupation: Actress
- Years active: 1994–present

Rumi Hiiragi (柊 瑠美, Hiiragi Rumi; born August 1, 1987) is a Japanese actress. She is best known for voicing the lead character Chihiro in the Japanese version of the Studio Ghibli film Spirited Away (2001).

== Career ==
Hiiragi first appeared in numerous commercials. She starred in the NHK asadora Suzuran and voiced Chihiro in Hayao Miyazaki's award-winning anime film Spirited Away. In 2002, she appeared in the high school baseball television program Netto Koshien as a field reporter. In 2005, she appeared in the NTV program Nobuta o Produce, portraying the character Kasumi Aoi.

== Filmography ==
=== Television ===
Year	Title	Role	Network	Notes	Ref.
1999	Suzuran	Young Moe Tokiwa	NHK	Asadora	
2005	Nobuta wo Produce		NTV		

=== Films ===
Year	Title	Role	Directed by	Notes	Ref.
2000	Return of Happiness	Moe Tokiwa	Rintaro Mayuzumi	Lead role; a side-story of the NHK morning drama program "Suzuran"	
2001	Spirited Away	Chihiro Ogino / Sen (voice)	Hayao Miyazaki	Lead role	
2008	Ponyo	Young mother (voice)	Hayao Miyazaki		
2008	Detroit Metal City	Merci (voice)	Toshio Lee		
2008	Threads of Destiny	Nozomi	Shosuke Murakami		
2010	Wandering Home	Momoka Inose	Yōichi Higashi		
2011	From Up on Poppy Hill	Sachiko Hirokoji (voice)	Goro Miyazaki		
2012	Bayside Shakedown: The Final	Police officer	Katsuyuki Motohiro		
2012	Key of Life	Editorial staff A	Kenji Uchida		
2014	Buy Bling, Get One Free!		Kosuke Takaya		
2015	Ryuzo and the Seven Henchmen		Takeshi Kitano		
2016	Happy Wedding		Shōzō Katashima		
2021	Blueheaven		Takehiko Hata		
2021	Ruined	Asumi Kawai	Taro Miyaoka		
2022	Life in Bloom		Nobuyuki Miyake		
