= Maki Horikita =

Japanese former actress (born 1988)

- 堀北 真希
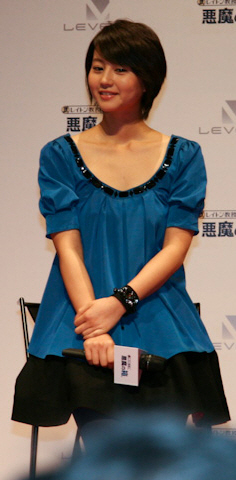
- Horikita at presentation of Professor Layton and the Diabolical Box, 2007
- Born: 原 麻里奈; October 6, 1988 (age 37); Kiyose, Tokyo, Japan
- Other name: 山本 麻里奈 (married)
- Occupations: Actress; voice actress
- Years active: 2003–2017
- Agent: Sweet Power
- Spouse: Koji Yamamoto (m. 2015)
- Children: 2
- Family: Nanami Hara (sister)

Maki Horikita (堀北 真希, Horikita Maki; born October 6, 1988) is a Japanese former actress. During her career from 2003 until 2017, she starred in numerous Japanese television dramas, television and magazine advertisements, and movies, including roles in Nobuta wo Produce, Hanazakari no Kimitachi e and Doctor Ume.

== Biography ==
Horikita was born on October 6, 1988, in Kiyose, Tokyo, Japan. She is the eldest of three daughters. Considered a tomboy in her childhood, Horikita enjoyed playing basketball and baseball. She was the vice-captain of their basketball club in junior high. Despite her boyishness, Horikita looked up to her mother. This was revealed when she appeared in an episode of KAT-TUN's now-defunct variety show Cartoon KAT-TUN where she mentioned that she liked imitating her mother when she was younger.

== Career ==
=== Print & TV endorsement ===
Apart from modeling for photobooks, Horikita has appeared in magazines and television advertisements. She is best remembered for her television commercials for Fujifilm (where she appeared alongside Japanese idol Tomoya Nagase) and Lotte. She is also a staple image endorser for Suntory and NTT DoCoMo. In 2008, Nihon Monitor recognized Horikita as one of Japan's top endorsers during its annual Most Popular Personality in TV CMs.

=== Acting ===
Horikita had been cast in several drama series and movies since 2003 but her roles in Densha Otoko and Nobuta wo Produce became her breakthrough performances. Her promising portrayal of the titular character in Nobuta wo Produce won her a Best Supporting Actress award from Japan's Television Academy Awards. It was also around this time that she won the Newcomer Award from Japan Academy Awards for her role as a student apprentice in Always: Sunset on Third Street.

In the following year, she won her second Best Supporting Actress award for her role in Kurosagi. Months later, she was given the lead role for Teppan Shoujo Akane!! and the role of a bully who is behind a class rebellion in Seito Shokun! where she co-starred with her agency senior Rina Uchiyama. She was also cast in the horror movie, One Missed Call: Final, the last installment of the One Missed Call franchise with agency colleague and best friend Meisa Kuroki and South Korean actor Jang Keun-suk.

Soon after, Horikita was awarded her first Best Actress award for her role as Mizuki Ashiya in the Japanese drama adaptation of the gender-bender manga Hana-Kimi, or Hanazakari no Kimitachi e. In the same year that Hana Kimi was filmed, Horikita also starred in the Taiga drama Atsuhime with Aoi Miyazaki. In the same year, she played the lead character who has multiple personality disorder in the suspense movie Tokyo Shōnen and reprised her role as a student apprentice in Always: Zoku Sanchome no Yuhi, the sequel to her breakthrough movie. Horikita's exceptional work was recognized by Vogue Nippon which identified her as one of the eleven Women of the Year in 2007.

On October of the following year, she was once again seen on television opposite Yuzu's lead vocalist Yujin Kitagawa, leading the cast of Fuji TV's golden time slot in the drama Innocent Love. Towards the end of the year, she had been cast as Naomi, the female protagonist of Dareka ga Watashi ni Kiss wo Shite or DareKiss (based on Gabrielle Zevin's popular novel, Memoirs of a Teenage Amnesiac) a Hollywood-Japan collaboration film directed by internationally acclaimed director and self-confessed Japanese culture fanatic Hans Canosa. It was revealed that one-third of her lines in the movie were in English.

As soon as the filming for DareKiss ended, Horikita had gone on to appear in two television dramas: Atashinchi no Danshi in 2009 as an adoptive mother of six young men (played by Jun Kaname and Mukai Osamu among others) and Tokujo Kabachi!! in 2010 as an administrative scrivener opposite Arashi's Sho Sakurai.

In January 2011, Horikita starred in the movie adaptation of Into the White Night, a widely read novel that was adapted into a television drama in 2006 starring Haruka Ayase and Takayuki Yamada. Produced by Wowow Films, the movie was screened at the Berlin Film Festival in the Panorama category.

In 2012, Horikita was offered to lead the cast of an NHK asadora named Doctor Ume . The morning drama featured Horikita as Umeko Shimomura in her carefree teenage years until she blossomed into a dependable town doctor during the Showa era. For the first time in nine years, NHK recorded an average audience rating past 20% for an asadora time slot when Doctor Ume garnered an average audience rating of 20.7%. At the end of 2012, Horikita made her stage debut in a performance of Joan of Arc.

After the success of her asadora, Horikita has continued accepting lead roles in more television and movie projects like in the evening dramas Miss Pilot in 2013 and Masshiro in 2015 as well as in the film Mugiko-san to in 2013.

=== Radio and voice acting ===
Horikita was one of the six female celebrities taking turns to host Girls Locks!, a segment of the Japanese radio program School of Locks from the radio network Tokyo FM. When she was the host, Horikita provided book recommendations to her listeners and called selected letter-senders to discuss the questions they wrote in their letters. Her stint was at ten in the evening, every third or fourth week of the month. She took turns with Erika Toda, Yui Aragaki, Chiaki Kuriyama, Nana Eikura, and Kii Kitano until she left the program in 2009.

Horikita had also ventured into voice acting, debuting as an anime voice actress for one of the characters in Nobita and the Green Giant Legend 2008. Her highly featured project as a voice actress was for Professor Layton in which she provided the voice of the main character Luke.

In early 2009, she also dubbed a character from the Belgian 3D animated movie Nat's Space Adventure 3D/Fly Me to the Moon. She dubbed the voice of the protagonist who is a young male fly who was determined to explore outer space.

== Personal life ==
On 22 August 2015 Horikita's management agency announced that she had married actor Koji Yamamoto earlier that day. The couple became close in May 2015 when playing the role of lovers in the theatrical production Arashi ga Oka (Wuthering Heights) and had commenced dating in June. On June 20, 2016, she announced her pregnancy. She gave birth to her first child in December 2016. On February 28, 2017, she announced her retirement from the entertainment industry.

== Filmography ==
=== TV dramas ===
Year	Title	Role	Notes	Ref.
2003	Dōbutsu no Oisha-san	Tamako Anzai		
2003	Keitai Deka Zenigata Mai	Mai Zenigata	Lead role	
2003	Koi Suru Nichiyōbi	Chikako Imamoto	Lead role; episode 16	
2004	Ningen no Shōmei	Sayaka Koori		
2004	Kaidan Shin Mimibukuro	Misuzu Inamine	Lead role	
2004	Division 1 Houkago	Mayuko Michida	Lead role	
2004	Honkowa: True Horror Stories	Yuka Tamura	Lead role	
2005	Nobuta wo Produce	Nobuko Kotani		
2005	Densha Otoko	Aoi Yamada		
2005	Akechi Kogoro VS Kindaichi Kosuke	Marina Saegusa	Television film	
2006	Teppan Shoujo Akane!!	Akane Kagura	Lead role	
2006	Densha Otoko Deluxe	Aoi Yamada	Television film	
2006	Kurosagi	Tsurara Yoshikawa		
2006	Tsubasa no Oreta Tenshitachi	Yuna	Lead role; television film	
2006	Honkowa: True Horror Stories: Summer 2006	Arisa Kubo	Lead role	
2007	Koi no Kara Sawagi Drama Special: Love Stories IV		Lead role; short drama	
2007	Galileo	Remi Morisaki	Episode 6	
2007	Deru Toko Demasho!	Shizuka Kamei	Lead role; television film	
2007	Hana-Kimi	Mizuki Ashiya	Lead role	
2007	Attention Students!	Juria Kimura		
2008	Danso no Reijin	Yoshiko Yamaguchi/Ri Kouran	Television film	
2008	Innocent Love	Kanon Akiyama	Lead role	
2008	Hanazakari no Kimitachi e SP	Mizuki Ashiya	Lead role; television film	
2008	Tokyo Air Raid	Haruko Sakuragi	Lead role; miniseries	
2008	Atsuhime	Princess Kazu	Taiga drama	
2009	My Boys: More Than Family But Less Than Lovers	Chisato Mineta	Lead role	
2009	Chance!	Tamaki Kawamura	Lead role; miniseries	
2010	Kikoku	Youko Kasai	Television film	
2010	Wagaya no Rekishi	Namiko Yame	Miniseries	
2010	Legal Eagle, First Class	Misuzu Sumiyoshi	Lead role	
2011	Umareru	Manami Hayashida	Lead role	
2012	Doctor Ume	Umeko Shimomura	Lead role; Asadora	
2013	Miss Pilot	Tezuka Haru	Lead role	
2014	Fathers	Mifuyu Marui	Lead role; episode 5	
2014	Matsumoto Seichō Drama Special: Kiri no Hata	Kiriko Yanagida	Lead role; television film	
2015	Nurses of the Palace	Akari Arimura	Lead role	
2016	Higanbana	Kurumiya Nagisa	Lead role	

=== Films ===
Year	Title	Role	Notes	Ref.
2003	Cosmic Rescue	Aya Mochizuki		
2003	Seventh Anniversary	Natsuki		
2004	The Locker	Ayano Kubo		
2004	The Locker 2	Ayano Kubo	Lead role	
2004	Crying Out Love in the Center of the World		Photo only	
2004	Hirakata	Yui Asakawa		
2004	Premonition	Sayuri Wakakubo		
2005	Gyakkyou Nine	Akiko Tsukita		
2005	Hinokio: Inter Galactic Love	Eriko Akishima		
2005	The Deep Red	Young Kanako		
2005	Always: Sunset on Third Street	Mutsuko Hoshino		
2006	Haru no Ibasho	Meiko	Lead role	
2006	Trick: The Movie 2	Misako Nishida		
2006	Mobile Detective: The Movie	Mai Zenigata		
2006	One Missed Call: Final	Asuka Matsuda	Lead role	
2007	Argentine Hag	Mitsuko	Lead role	
2007	Last Words	Nagisa Ninomiya	Lead role	
2007	Always: Sunset on Third Street 2	Mutsuko Hoshino		
2008	Kurosagi	Tsurara Yoshikawa		
2008	Tokyo Boy	Minato / Night	Lead role	
2008	Doraemon: Nobita and the Green Giant Legend	Princess Lire (voice)		
2009	Memoirs of a Teenage Amnesiac	Naomi Sukuse	Lead role	
2009	Professor Layton and the Eternal Diva	Luke Triton (voice)		
2010	The Lady Shogun and Her Men	Onobu		
2011	Into the White Night	Yukiho Karasawa	Lead role	
2011	That's the Way!!	Hatsumi Takeda	Lead role	
2012	Always: Sunset on Third Street 3	Mutsuko Hoshino		
2013	Hospitality Department	Taki Myojin	Lead role	
2013	SPEC: Close		Cameo	
2013	My Little Sweet Pea	Mugiko	Lead role	
2014	A Samurai Chronicle	Toda Kaoru		

=== Video games ===
- Professor Layton series - Luke Triton
- Professor Layton vs. Ace Attorney - Luke Triton

=== Dubbing ===
- Fantastic Four, Sue Storm / Invisible Woman (Kate Mara)

== Accolades ==
Year	Award	Category	Notable Works	Result	Ref.
2005	27th Yokohama Film Festival	Best New Talent	Always: Sunset on Third Street	Won	
2006	29th Japan Academy Film Prize	Rookie of the Year	Always: Sunset on Third Street	Won	
2006	15th TV Life Annual Drama Awards	Best Supporting Actress	Nobuta wo Produce	Won	
2006	30th Elan d'or Awards	Newcomer Award	Herself	Won	
2006	MTV Student Voice Awards	Best Teen Actress	Herself	Won	
2007	4th Beauty Week Award	The Best of Beauty	Herself	Won	
2007	Vogue Nippon Awards	Women of the Year	Herself	Won	
2008	17th TV Life Annual Drama Awards	Best Actress	Hanazakari no Kimitachi E	Won	
2008	11th Nikkan Sports Drama Grand Prix	Best Actress	Hanazakari no Kimitachi E	Won	
2008	31st Japan Academy Film Prize	Best Supporting Actress	Always: Sunset on Third Street 2	Nominated	
2008	5th Cotton USA Awards	Miss Cotton USA	Herself	Won	
2008	19th Japan Best Jewellery Wearer Awards	Best Jewellery Wearer	Herself	Nominated	
2009	Vogue Nippon Awards	Best Leathernist	Herself	Won	
2010	9th Ms. Lily Awards	Miss Lily 2010	Herself	Won	
2010	Gold Dream Awards	Culture & Entertainment Category	Herself	Won	
2012	16th Nikkan Sports Drama Grand Prix	Best Actress	Doctor Ume	Won	
2012	Fountain Pen Best Coordinate Award 2012	Fountain Pen Best Coordinate Award	Herself	Won	
2013	2nd Best Beautist Awards	Actress Category	Herself	Won	
