= Warota! =

Japanese Prime Video comedy series

Japanese name
- Kanji: ワロタ！
Transcriptions
- Revised Hepburn: Warota!
- Genre: Comedy; Sketch comedy; Variety Show
- Directed by: Junya Komatsu
- Starring: SixTones; Jesse; Taiga Kyomoto; Hokuto Matsumura; Yugo Kochi; Shintaro Morimoto; Juri Tanaka
- Country of origin: Japan
- Original language: Japanese
- No. of seasons: 2
- No. of episodes: 14

Production
- Producers: Natsuko Ogata; Kota Shimamoto
- Production location: Japan
- Camera setup: Multi-camera
- Running time: 50 minutes
- Production company: Storm Labels Inc.

Original release
- Network: Prime Video
- Release: July 18, 2025 – August 19, 2026

Warota! (Japanese: ワロタ！) is a Japanese original comedy program distributed by Prime Video.The series features the six members of the idol group SixTones in scripted comedy sketches. It premiered on July 18, 2025 A second season premiered on July 29, 2026.

== Overview ==
The series marking the group's first program devoted entirely to a sketch-based format. Across the series, the members appear in scripted performances that explore different comedic premises, often supported by large scale set designs and narrative framing. Production involves collaboration with external actors and comedy creators, allowing the members to engage with a range of performance styles and roles.

== Format ==
Each episode is composed of multiple scripted segments organized around individual themes or settings. These segments include both self-contained sketches and recurring formats, with an emphasis on situational and character based comedy. Guest participants appear in select segments, contributing to the storyline or performance structure. Episodes also incorporate studio based segments that provide transitions or reflections on the performances, resulting in a hybrid format that combines structured sketch comedy with elements typical of Japanese variety programming.

== Cast ==
- SixTones
  - Jesse
  - Taiga Kyomoto
  - Hokuto Matsumura
  - Yugo Kochi
  - Shintaro Morimoto
  - Juri Tanaka

== Episodes ==
=== Season 1 ===
No.	Original release date	Sketch	Sketch performers	Studio guest(s)	Ref.
1	July 18, 2025	"Matsupin (The Odd Couple)" Part 1	Hokuto Matsumura, Shintaro Morimoto	Ikkei Watanabe	
1	July 18, 2025	"PARTY3 (Kamata and Space)"	Ikkei Watanabe, Juri Tanaka, Taiga Kyomoto, Jesse	Ikkei Watanabe	
1	July 18, 2025	"SAT" Part 1	Shintaro Morimoto, Hokuto Matsumura, Juri Tanaka, Yugo Kochi, Taiga Kyomoto, Jimmy Onishi	Ikkei Watanabe	
1	July 18, 2025	"Momotaro" (Demon Slayers) Part 1	Taiga Kyomoto, Hokuto Matsumura, Yugo Kochi	Ikkei Watanabe	
2	August 1, 2025	"Super FD HAZAMA"	Shintaro Morimoto, Juri Tanaka	Shigeyuki Totsugi	
2	August 1, 2025	"Zenshoku wa? (Solution for Your Life)"	Shigeyuki Totsugi, Taiga Kyomoto	Shigeyuki Totsugi	
2	August 1, 2025	"Momotaro (Demon Slayers)" Part 2	Taiga Kyomoto, Hokuto Matsumura, Yugo Kochi, Shintaro Morimoto	Shigeyuki Totsugi	
2	August 1, 2025	"SAT" Part 2	Shintaro Morimoto, Hokuto Matsumura, Juri Tanaka, Yugo Kochi, Taiga Kyomoto, Jimmy Onishi	Shigeyuki Totsugi	
2	August 1, 2025	"Ano Natsu no Hanashi (Boys of Summer)"	Shintaro Morimoto, Hokuto Matsumura, Juri Tanaka, Yugo Kochi, Taiga Kyomoto, Jesse, Jimmy Onishi	Shigeyuki Totsugi	
3	August 15, 2025	"Mago Mitai Na Mon"	Shintaro Morimoto, Hokuto Matsumura, Juri Tanaka, Yugo Kochi, Taiga Kyomoto, Jesse	Hiroki Akiyama	
3	August 15, 2025	"Matsupin (The Odd Couple)" Part 2	Shintaro Morimoto, Hokuto Matsumura	Hiroki Akiyama	
3	August 15, 2025	"SAT" Part 3	Shintaro Morimoto, Hokuto Matsumura, Juri Tanaka, Yugo Kochi, Taiga Kyomoto, Jesse, Seira Anzai, Jimmy Onishi	Hiroki Akiyama	
3	August 15, 2025	"Yabaken Sensei (The Great Teacher)"	Taiga Kyomoto, Jesse, Yugo Kochi	Hiroki Akiyama	
4	August 29, 2025	"Momotaro (Demon Slayers)" Part 3	Taiga Kyomoto, Hokuto Matsumura, Yugo Kochi, Shintaro Morimoto	Makoto Ueda, Kaho Minami	
4	August 29, 2025	"Minatoku Joshi no Koi (Lovers in the City)"	Taiga Kyomoto, Juri Tanaka, Seira Anzai, Kaho Minami	Makoto Ueda, Kaho Minami	
4	August 29, 2025	"Toilet (A Locked Door)"	Juri Tanaka, Yugo Kochi, Jesse	Makoto Ueda, Kaho Minami	
5	September 12, 2025	"Tooru to Masaya (Muscles)"	Jesse, Juri Tanaka, Kohei Ueda, Tomoka Kurotani	Kohei Ueda, Tomoka Kurotani	
5	September 12, 2025	"Ai to Kabutobushi (Road to Happiness)"	Hokuto Matsumura, Mayu Miyamoto	Kohei Ueda, Tomoka Kurotani	
5	September 12, 2025	"Neru Mae Ni (What You Need To Sleep)" Part 1	Hokuto Matsumura, Juri Tanaka, Yugo Kochi, Jesse	Kohei Ueda, Tomoka Kurotani	
5	September 12, 2025	"SAT" Part 4	Shintaro Morimoto, Hokuto Matsumura, Juri Tanaka, Yugo Kochi, Taiga Kyomoto, Jesse, Seira Anzai, Jimmy Onishi	Kohei Ueda, Tomoka Kurotani	
6	September 26, 2025	"Marathon Taikai"	Shintaro Morimoto, Juri Tanaka, Yugo Kochi, Udai Iwasaki	Udai Iwasaki, Satoshi Miki	
6	September 26, 2025	"Neru Mae Ni (What You Need To Sleep)" Part 2	Hokuto Matsumura, Juri Tanaka, Yugo Kochi, Jesse	Udai Iwasaki, Satoshi Miki	
6	September 26, 2025	"Guuzen Kyokai"	Shintaro Morimoto, Hokuto Matsumura, Juri Tanaka, Yugo Kochi, Taiga Kyomoto, Jesse	Udai Iwasaki, Satoshi Miki	

=== Season 2 ===
No.	Original release date	Sketch	Sketch performers	Studio guest(s)	Ref.
1	July 29, 2026	"Tooru to Masaya (Muscles)" Part 2	Jesse, Juri Tanaka, Taiga Kyomoto, Hikari Ishida	Hikari Ishida, Takashi Sasano	
1	July 29, 2026	"Super FD HAZAMA" Part 2	Shintaro Morimoto, Juri Tanaka, Takashi Sasano	Hikari Ishida, Takashi Sasano	
1	July 29, 2026	"Mobara Emperors (Charm-Point of ATAI)"	Shintaro Morimoto, Hokuto Matsumura, Juri Tanaka, Yugo Kochi, Taiga Kyomoto, Jesse	Hikari Ishida, Takashi Sasano	
2	July 29, 2026	"Kakure Meiten (in KAMATA)"	Shintaro Morimoto, Hokuto Matsumura, Juri Tanaka, Taiga Kyomoto, Jesse, Ikkei Watanabe	Ikkei Watanabe, Karen Otomo	
2	July 29, 2026	"Gaito Interview (about the inflation)"	Hokuto Matsumura, Yugo Kochi, Karen Otomo	Ikkei Watanabe, Karen Otomo	
2	July 29, 2026	"Buzzer Beater"	Shintaro Morimoto, Hokuto Matsumura, Juri Tanaka, Yugo Kochi, Taiga Kyomoto, Jesse	Ikkei Watanabe, Karen Otomo	
3	August 5, 2026	"Ginko Goto (and S&P500)"	Ken Mitsuishi, Jesse, Shintaro Morimoto	Ken Mitsuishi, Rainbow (Jumbo Takao・Naoto Ikeda)	
3	August 5, 2026	"Shokujikai"	Hokuto Matsumura, Jumbo Takao, Naoto Ikeda	Ken Mitsuishi, Rainbow (Jumbo Takao・Naoto Ikeda)	
3	August 5, 2026	"Yabaken Sensei (The Great Teacher)" Part 2	Jesse, Juri Tanaka, Yugo Kochi	Ken Mitsuishi, Rainbow (Jumbo Takao・Naoto Ikeda)	
4	August 5, 2026	"Tobira no Oku"	Udai Iwasaki, Shintaro Morimoto, Yugo Kochi, Taiga Kyomoto, Jesse	Seira Anzai, Udai Iwasaki	
4	August 5, 2026	"SAT" Part 5	Shintaro Morimoto, Hokuto Matsumura, Juri Tanaka, Yugo Kochi, Taiga Kyomoto, Jesse, Seira Anzai, Jimmy Onishi	Seira Anzai, Udai Iwasaki	
4	August 5, 2026	"Zombie ni Nattara (shoot me!)"	Juri Tanaka, Yugo Kochi	Seira Anzai, Udai Iwasaki	
5	August 12, 2026	"Kokoro no koe de (telepathy)"	Toru Nomaguchi, Shintaro Morimoto	Toru Nomaguchi	
5	August 12, 2026	"Neru Mae Ni (What You Need To Sleep)" Part 3	Shintaro Morimoto, Hokuto Matsumura, Yugo Kochi, Jesse	Toru Nomaguchi	
5	August 12, 2026	"SAT" Part 6	Shintaro Morimoto, Hokuto Matsumura, Juri Tanaka, Yugo Kochi, Taiga Kyomoto, Jesse, Seira Anzai, Jimmy Onishi	Toru Nomaguchi	
6	August 12, 2026	"Announcer Gakko"	Ken Horiuchi, Shintaro Morimoto, Hokuto Matsumura, Juri Tanaka, Yugo Kochi, Taiga Kyomoto, Jesse	Ken Horiuchi	
6	August 12, 2026	"Takuhaibin (AI humanoid TAIGA)"	Yugo Kochi, Taiga Kyomoto	Ken Horiuchi	
6	August 12, 2026	"Motion Capture"	Hokuto Matsumura, Juri Tanaka, Yugo Kochi, Jesse	Ken Horiuchi	
7	August 19, 2026	"Matsupin (The Odd Couple)" Part 3	Shintaro Morimoto, Hokuto Matsumura, Airi Matsui	Hiroki Akiyama, Airi Matsui	
7	August 19, 2026	"Mago Mitai Na Mon" Part 2	Hiroki Akiyama, Shintaro Morimoto, Hokuto Matsumura, Juri Tanaka, Yugo Kochi, Taiga Kyomoto, Jesse, Nyanko Star	Hiroki Akiyama, Airi Matsui	
7	August 19, 2026	"Neru Mae Ni (What You Need To Sleep)" Part 4	Hokuto Matsumura, Juri Tanaka, Taiga Kyomoto, Jesse	Hiroki Akiyama, Airi Matsui	
8	August 19, 2026	"Hanten (My Heart on The Right)"	Hokuto Matsumura, Juri Tanaka, Yugo Kochi, Taiga Kyomoto, Jesse	Makoto Ueda, Nako Yabuki	
8	August 19, 2026	"Shoot ga Haitara... (Love in a Basket)"	Hokuto Matsumura, Nako Yabuki	Makoto Ueda, Nako Yabuki	
8	August 19, 2026	"Kamigata Jiyuu"	Shintaro Morimoto, Hokuto Matsumura, Juri Tanaka, Yugo Kochi, Taiga Kyomoto, Jesse	Makoto Ueda, Nako Yabuki	

== Broadcast and distribution ==
The first episode premiered on Prime Video Japan on July 18, 2025, at 16:00 JST. The six-episode first season was released biweekly on Fridays, concluding on September 26, 2025. A second season premiered on July 29, 2026, with its eight episodes rolling out in pairs each Wednesday through August 19, 2026.
