= Boys (Japanese musical) =

Japanese musical production from 1969

Boys (少年たち)
- Promotional poster 2021
- Book: Johnny Kitagawa
- Setting: Juvenile prison
- Premiere: 1969: Nissay Theatre
- Productions: 1969 Tokyo, Osaka; 1970 Tokyo, Nagoya, Osaka; 1975 Tokyo, Nagoya, Osaka; 2010 Osaka, Tokyo; 2011 Osaka, Tokyo; 2012 Osaka, Tokyo; 2015 Osaka, Tokyo; 2016 Tokyo; 2017 Osaka, Tokyo, Osaka; 2017 Live Tour; 2018 Osaka, Tokyo; 2019 Osaka, Tokyo; 2021 Tokyo; 2022 Tokyo, Nagoya; 2023 Tokyo

Boys (Japanese: 少年たち, Hepburn: Shōnentachi) is a musical theatre production featuring many performers from Johnny & Associates. The theme of the show is friendship, peace, and dreams of future by boys in juvenile prison for various reasons. Since its premiere in 1969, Four Leaves played the lead roles until 1975, and since its restoration in 2010, many young members, mainly trainees affiliated with Johnny's, have appeared in the show.

The musical theatre Boys was premiered in 1969, using songs from Four Leaves' 1969 LP record Boys: A Little Resistance. This play was revised and performed in successive productions, and became known as Boys musical theatre series. In 2010, after 34-year absence, the play was revived starring A.B.C-Z and Kis-My-Ft2, trainee groups at the time. After that, it has been performed by young trainees. Since 2015, the theme of "War and Peace" has been incorporated into the show. It was also made into a movie Ninja Drones? in 2019.

This production was written, planned, composed, and directed by Johnny Kitagawa. Hideaki Takizawa has been directing the show since 2019, after Kitagawa's death, and Hikaru Iwamoto of Snow Man has been directing the show since 2023, when Takizawa left the company.

== Story ==
The main outline of the story is basically the same. The setting is a juvenile prison. One day, a new boy arrives. Then he meets other boys who are imprisoned for various causes. However, the imprisonment]boys are divided into two teams and are at odds with each other and fighting every day. As the days go by unchanged, a new prison officer arrives who is Violence|violent and cruel. The situation around them changes in various ways, but the boys come up with the idea of a prison escape, and the two opposing teams join forces to carry out their escape plan. After the first act of the main program, the second act is a showtime of singing and dancing.

== Production history ==
=== Early performances (1969–1975) ===
This production was premiered by Four Leaves in 1969 as Boys: A Little Resistance and was followed by a series of productions from 1970 to 1971, the sixth in the series. In 1975, the trainees performed The Boys – Four Leaves Immortal, but the performance of the series was interrupted after this. In 1976, Boys 2 was performed as a live musical during Four Leaves' 10th anniversary concert.

Year	Title	Theatre	Notes
1969	Boys: A Little Resistance	Festival Hall, Osaka, Nissay Theatre	Starring Four Leaves
1970	Musical '70 "Boys: Complete"	Nissay Theatre	Starring Four Leaves
1970	Four Leaves Musical, "When We Run Barefoot"		Starring Four Leaves
1971	Four Leaves Musical "Boys from the Sun"		Starring Four Leaves
1971	Four Leaves Musical "Friendship Without Tomorrow"		Starring Four Leaves
1971	Four Leaves Live Musical "It's Us Who Live!"	Imperial Theatre. Touring Nagoya and Osaka.	Starring Four Leaves
1975	Live Musical "The Boys – Four Leaves Immortals"		Starring trainees
1976	Live Musical "Boys Part II – Light and Shadow of Youth"		Starring Four Leaves

=== Boys: Prison without Bars (2010) ===
This production was revived in the summer of 2010 for the first time in 34 years, starring a group of trainees. Kansai Johnny's Jr., trainees working in the Kansai region in Japan, performed at Osaka Shochikuza in August 2010, and A.B.C-Z and Kis-My-Ft2 performed at Tokyo Nissay Theatre in September 2010. Although the title is the same, most of the direction was left to the performers. The performers each shared their opinions, and they were presented in a way that made the most of their individual characters and specialties. Therefore, the composition, show time, and other content differed between Osaka and Tokyo. At the press conference held on August 3, 2010 to announce the production of the Tokyo performance, a video letter was delivered from members of Kansai trainees.

At the performance at the Nissay Theatre in Tokyo, even though joint rehearsals were not possible, meetings were held over Skype and other methods and a dance competition between Koichi Goseki and Kento Senga, a drum performance by Yuta Tamamori, and danced with a tub at bathing scene, later called "tub dance", were performed. At the time, Kis-My-Ft2 and A.B.C-Z had not yet debuted, and were performing as trainees, Kitagawa decided to let Kis-My-Ft2 make their CD debut after seeing this performance. Kis-My-Ft2 consisted of seven members at the time, and five of them, excluding Wataru Yokoo and Takashi Nikaido, were cast in that show. According to Hiromitsu Kitayama and Taisuke Fujigaya, Kitagawa initially planned to debut Kis-My-Ft2 with five members, excluding Yokoo and Nikaido. So they appealed directly to Kitagawa that they should debut together, and in 2011, they debuted as a seven-member group.

==== 2010 ====
Place	Osaka	Tokyo
Date	August 3 – 28	September 3 – 26
Theatre	Shochikuza, Osaka	Nissay Theatre, Tokyo
Director	Johnny Kitagawa	
Main cast	Akito Kiriyama, Junta Nakama, Takahiro Hamada, Tomohiro Kamiyama, Ryusei Fujii, Daiki Shigeoka, Nozomu Kotaki as prisoner; Koji Mukai; Joichiro Fujiwara; Bunichi Hamanaka, Ryuta Muro as prison guard	Ryosuke Hashimoto, Shota Totsuka, Fumito Kawai, Ryoichi Tsukada, Ryoichi Goseki from A.B.C-Z; Hiromitsu Kitayama, Kento Senga, Toshiya Miyata, Taisuke Fujigaya, Yuta Tamamori from Kis-My-Ft2 (Note: Takashi Nikaido and Wataru Yokoo were not cast and appeared as five members.); Tatsuya Fukazawa, Daisuke Sakuma, Shota Watanabe, Ryota Miyadate, Hikaru Iwamoto, Ryohei Abe from Mis Snow Man as prison guard; Yuma Sanada as prison officer chief

=== Boys: Prison without Bars (2011) ===
In August 2011, Kansai trainees performed Boys: Prison without Bars at the Osaka Shochikuza, and in September, A.B.C-Z and Kansai trainees performed Boys: Prison without Bars at the Tokyo Nissay Theatre. As Fumito Kawai had to perform in a wheelchair after dislocating and breaking his left leg during his performance on July 23rd in the stage Playzone '11 Song & Danc'n., it was suddenly decided that Fuma Kikuchi would perform as a supporting actor in the Nissay Theatre performance. Therefore, the actual performers differed from those listed on the official posters announced in advance in July. The "tub dance" was performed as it was last year. Before and after the stage play at the Osaka Shochikuza performance, there was a Show Time, during which Kansai trainees performed about 20 numbers. At the Nissay Theater performance, they sang two of his best-known songs, "Kaimono Boogie" and "Blue Mountains," accompanied by a piano by Blüthner, which was given to Kitagawa by the late Ryoichi Hattori.

==== 2011 ====
Place	Osaka	Tokyo
Date	August 3 – 27	September 5 – 29
Theatre	Shochikuza, Osaka	Nissay Theatre, Tokyo
Director	Johnny Kitagawa	
Main cast	Tomohiro Kamiyama, Ryusei Fujii, Daiki Shigeoka, Nozomu Kotaki as prisoner of red team; Akito Kiriyama, Junta Nakama, Takahiro Hamada, Koji Mukai as prisoner of blue team; Ren Nagase, Daigo Nishihata, Yoshinori Masakado from Ae Shonen; Bunichi Hamanaka as prison officer chief; Shigeoka as new prisoner	Ryosuke Hashimoto, Shota Totsuka, Fumito Kawai, Ryoichi Tsukada, Ryoichi Goseki from A.B.C-Z; Daiki Shigeoka, Akito Kiriyama, Junta Nakama, Takahiro Hamada, Tomohiro Kamiyama; Yuma Sanada as prison officer chief; Yuta Kishi, Noel Kawashima, So Matsushima, Shori Sato, Marius Yo; Fuma Kikuchi (special appearance)

=== Boys: Prison without Bars (August 2012) ===
In August 2012 at the Osaka Shochikuza, Kansai trainees A new group "Naniwa Oji", formed by Ren Nagase, Daigo Nishihata, and Ryusei Onishi, was first unveiled. Onishi is a fifth grader who has only been with Johnny's for a month. Even though he has already been dancing for five years, his unusually early appearance at the event attracted a lot of attention.

==== August 2012 ====
Place	Osaka
Date	August 4 – 27
Theatre	Shochikuza, Osaka
Director	Johnny Kitagawa
Main cast	Akito Kiriyama, Tomohiro Kamiyama, Ryusei Fujii as prisoner of blue team; Nozomu Kotaki, Daiki Shigeoka, Junta Nakama as prisoner of red team; Takahiro Hamada as cruel prison officer chief; Koji Mukai as prison officer; Ren Nagase, Daigo Nishihata, Ryusei Onishi from "Naniwa Oji"

=== Boys: Jail in the Sky (September 2012) ===
Starring A.B.C-Z. Since Ryoichi Tsukada injured his right leg ligament during rehearsals on August 21 and was diagnosed with a three-week recovery, he changed his appearances to focus on talking instead of doing acrobatics.

==== September 2012 ====
Place	Tokyo
Date	September 5 – 29
Theatre	Nissay Theatre, Tokyo
Director	Johnny Kitagawa
Main cast	Ryosuke Hashimoto, Shota Totsuka, Fumito Kawai, Ryoichi Tsukada, Ryoichi Goseki from A.B.C-Z as prisoner of red team; Daiki Shigeoka, Akito Kiriyama, Junta Nakama, Tomohiro Kamiyama, Ryusei Fujii as prisoner of blue team; Takahiro Hamada as prison officer chief; Nozomu Kotaki as prison officer; Noel Kawashima, Tatsuya Shimekake, Kaito Miyachika from Travis Japan

=== Boys: Dream of The World...Children Who Don't Know War (2015) ===
At the Tokyo performance, SixTones and Snow Man played the lead roles for the first time. From this production, elements of a war story based on Kitagawa's experience have been added, and the message of war and the wish for peace are now more strongly expressed. The conflict structure between the two teams in the prison remains the same, but a story is added in the middle of the play in which one of the boys, Jesse, is deported back to his home country, United States, and sent to the battlefield as a soldier.

==== 2015 ====
Place	Osaka	Tokyo
Date	August 2 – 26	September 4 – 27
Theatre	Shochikuza, Osaka	Nissay Theatre, Tokyo
Director	Johnny Kitagawa	
Main cast	Daigo Nishihata, Ryusei Onishi, Yoshinori Masakado, Ken Kojima as prisoner of red team; Koji Mukai, Joichiro Fujiwara, Kazuya Ohashi, Keita Kusama Richard as prisoner of blue team; Ryuta Muro as prison officer chief; Kyohei Takahashi, Shunsuke Michieda, Kento Nagao as younger brother of Nishihata (Appearances change daily); Seiya Suezawa	Jesse, Hokuto Matsumura, Taiga Kyomoto, Juri Tanaka, Shintaro Morimoto, Yugo Kochi from SixTones as prisoner of orange team; Hikaru Iwamoto, Tatsuya Fukasawa, Shota Watanabe, Ryota Miyadate, Daisuke Sakuma, Ryohei Abe from Snow Man as prisoner of green team; Daigo Nishihata, Koji Mukai as prison officer; Ryuta Muro as prison officer chief

=== The Boys, Crisis! (2016) ===
Continuing from last year, SixTones and Snow Man played the lead roles, and the four members of HiHi Jets (Ryo Hashimoto, Mizuki Inoue, Soya Inogari, and Yuto Takahashi) appeared in a double appearance with Dream Boy at the Imperial Theatre, appearing only in the first half of the second act in this production.

The role of the cruel prison officer chief, who had appeared in previous performances, was played by Teruhiko Aoi, using only his voice. In the second half of the first act, which depicts 12 young people imprisoned for different reasons clashing in prison, the "tub dance" returned for the first time in four years. The song "Akanezora" written by Yuya Tegoshi with lyrics by Taiga Kyomoto was used as the song of the second act. Jesse, who was deported and joins the army after his release due to his foreign citizenship, and Marius Yo, a boy whose youth was stolen by the war, play the central roles in the serious war scenes, while the eleven people who are released from prison and start pursuing their own dreams are portrayed cheerfully, and the contrast between them brings the tragedy and fear of the war more into relief. The ending of the play was also serious, with the death of a friend in the war, but the song "A Song to You (君にこの歌を)", a Four Leaves' traditional song from this musical series, was performed many times in the play to convey the message that war is still happening somewhere in this world and that this is why every ordinary day is a happy day.

==== 2016 ====
Place	Tokyo
Date	September 5 – 29
Theatre	Nissay Theatre, Tokyo
Director	Johnny Kitagawa
Main cast	Jesse, Taiga Kyomoto, Hokuto Matsumura, Shintaro Morimoto, Juri Tanaka, Yugo Kochi from SixTones as prisoner of orange team; Hikaru Iwamoto, Tatsuya Fukazawa, Shota Watanabe, Ryota Miyadate, Daisuke Sakuma, Ryohei Abe from Snow Man as prisoner of green team; Marius Yo from Sexy Zone as child soldier; Ryo Hashimoto, Mizuki Inoue, Soya Igari, Yuto Takahashi from HiHi Jets as Celebrities appearing on TV programs; Teruhiko Aoi as cruel prison guard chief, voice only

=== Boys: Snow Falls on a Southern Island (2017) ===
Elements of the stage play Another, a possession play that once starred SMAP and others, were added. Another was first performed by SMAP in 1991, and KinKi Kids, who was a trainee at the time, also appeared on the stage.

==== August 2017 ====
Place	Osaka
Date	August 2 – 27
Theatre	Shochikuza, Osaka
Director	Johnny Kitagawa
Main cast	Ryusei Onishi as new prisoner of red team; Daigo Nishihata, Ken Kojima, Yoshinori Masakado, Masaya Sano as prisoner of red team; Koji Mukai, Kento Nagao, Kazuya Ohashi, Kyohei Takahashi, Daichi Imae as prisoner of blue team; Ryuta Muro as cruel prison guard chief; Joichiro Fujiwara as prison guard; Shunsuke Michieda as Islanders; Richard Keita Kusama as god of islands

=== Boys: Born Tomorrow (2017) ===
For the third consecutive year, SixTones and Snow Man starred in this production, which ran for 71 performances, the most in the series, including the Osaka performances. With the theme of anti-war and friendship, the script this time reflected Kitagawa's real-life experience of war when he was a teenager, and more serious and realistic depictions of war were added, such as hiding alone under a bridge to escape U.S. military air raids on Japan. The annual "tub dance" was also performed. Snow Man performed "Vanishing Over" and SixTones performed "Beautiful Life" in the main program, but two more new songs by both units were performed in the 20-minute show time after the main program. "Guys Snow Man" was choreographed and composed by Hikaru Iwamoto, and "Japonica Style" by SixTones incorporated "Japanese" in their costumes and lyrics.

==== September to November 2017 ====
Place	Tokyo	Osaka
Date	September 7 – 28	October 27 – November 12
Theatre	Nissay Theatre, Tokyo	Shochikuza, Osaka
Director	Johnny Kitagawa	
Main cast	Jesse, Hokuto Matsumura, Taiga Kyomoto, Juri Tanaka, Shintaro Morimoto, Yugo Kochi from SixTones as prisoner of orange team; Hikaru Iwamoto, Tatsuya Fukasawa, Shota Watanabe, Ryota Miyadate, Daisuke Sakuma, Ryohei Abe from Snow Man as prisoner of green team; Teruhiko Aoi as cruel prison guard chief (voice only)	

=== The Boys Live (2017) ===
Live performances of songs from the stage play Boys were held in four cities across Japan.

Place	Toyohashi, Himeji, Wakayama, Hiroshima
Date	October 2017
Main cast	Jesse, Hokuto Matsumura, Taiga Kyomoto, Juri Tanaka, Shintaro Morimoto, Yugo Kochi from SixTones; Hikaru Iwamoto, Tatsuya Fukasawa, Shota Watanabe, Ryota Miyadate, Daisuke Sakuma, Ryohei Abe from Snow Man

=== Boys: Running Through Tomorrow (2018) ===
The cast has been completely changed from Boys: Snow Falls on a Southern Island. The story is about a blue team led by Nishihata and a red team led by Onishi, who have spent most of their time fighting, escape from a violent prison guard and plan to team up to escape from prison in search of freedom. Three new songs, "Super Rocket," "Let Me Go!" and "Midnight Devil," were also performed during show time after the main play.

==== August 2018 ====
Place	Osaka
Date	August 4 – 30
Theatre	Shochikuza, Osaka
Director	Johnny Kitagawa
Main cast	Daigo Nishihata as a leader of blue team; Ryusei Onishi as a leader of red team; Kyohei Takahashi, Shunsuke Michieda: The two are rivals who have been at odds with each other since the past.; Koji Mukai as cruel prison guard; Kento Nagao as new prisoner; Kazuya Ohashi, Joichiro Fujiwara; Ken Kojima, Yoshiki Masakado, Akira Sano; Ryuta Muro, Daichi Imae

=== Boys: And then... (2018) ===
The first performance on September 7 marked the 100th performance at the Nissay Theatre. The performance lasted approximately 2 hours and 25 minutes, including 20 minutes of showtime between acts and after the main program, and as in previous years, the first act depicted the conflict and struggles of the boys in prison. The sports competition held during the event included a basketball performance using a trampoline. Annual "tub dance" was more voluminous than last year's. Their new song performance "Don't Hold Back" by Snow Man and "Night Train" by SixTones were also performed. Unlike last year, the second act started with the scene of Jesse's farewell to the battlefield. The other members also became war photographers (Matsumura and Fukazawa), street performers (Tanaka and Watanabe), aerial performers (Morimoto and Miyadate), and street artists (Takaji, Sakuma, and Abe), each achieving their dreams and pledging to do what they can for peace. The content focuses more on the bonds between family and friends than last year, which focused on the message of war and peace. During showtime, Snow Man and SixTones performed "Party! Party! Party!" and "Hysteria", respectively, and the 13 members, 12 plus Taisho Iwasaki, sang "We'll Be Together" to close the event.

A donation box was placed in the lobby of the venue to raise funds for 2018 Hokkaido Eastern Iburi earthquake that occurred on September 6, the day before the first performance.

==== September 2018 ====
Place	Tokyo
Date	September 7 – 28
Theatre	Nissay Theatre, Tokyo
Director	Johnny Kitagawa
Main cast	Jesse, Taiga Kyomoto, Hokuto Matsumura, Shintaro Morimoto, Juri Tanaka, Yugo Kochi from SixTones; Hikaru Iwamoto, Tatsuya Fukazawa, Shota Watanabe, Ryota Miyadate, Daisuke Sakuma, Ryohei Abe from Snow Man; Taisho Iwasaki; Raul from Shonen Ninja; Teruhiko Aoi (voice of a guard, voice only)

=== Boys in the Light of Youth... (2019) ===
Naniwa Danshi will be the first leader of the troupe. Kitagawa, who is known for planning, composition, and general direction, died on July 9 before the performance started, and the members were advised by Tadayoshi Okura to compose and direct the showtime by Shunsuke Michieda, costumes by Kento Nagao, and hair clips for goods produced by Ryusei Onishi. The members of the group were challenged by the production of this work. The theatrical part was directed by Takaaki Inoue, but the casting was left to Okura. The content of the show differed from the August performances at Shochiku in previous years, and theatrical techniques were used, such as moving the set that looked like a lattice by themselves, and it was a modern production that had not been seen in past performances. The showtime composition was Michieda's idea, and in addition to the summer song's medley and shuffle songs medley, Naniwa Danshi performed "Aoharu – with U with me" and Lil Kansai performed "Lil Miracle", both in new costumes.

==== August 2019 ====
Place	Osaka
Date	August 2 – 30
Theatre	Shochikuza, Osaka
Director	Johnny Kitagawa (Stage Play: Takaaki Inoue, Show Time: Shunsuke Michieda)
Main cast	Daigo Nishihata as Yuji Omura; The leader of red cell. Kind-hearted and well-liked by his peers.; Ryusei Onishi as Kosaku Suzumura; Prisoner of red cell. Dexterously making accessories and other items from scrap metal.; Shunsuke Michieda as Junpei Aimura; Leader of blue Cell. Cool and intelligent. Loves his little brother. He is a quick fighter.; Kyohei Takahashi as Go Sakuragi; Prisoner of red Cell. Former fighter.; Kento Nagao as Kimimaro Otawada; Newcomer to blue cell. He is laid-back and his family is wealthy.; Kazuya Ohashi as Takumi Kakimoto; A newcomer to red cell. He is a very bright optimist; Joichiro Fujiwara as Sojiro Murata; New prison guard. He was a classmate of Yuji. He tries to rehabilitate the boys in a friendly manner. Actually an undercover agent.; Kong Kuwata as Head of the prison guard

=== Boys To be! (2019) ===
Starring SixTones and Snow Man for the fifth consecutive year, this production was performed by a total of 15 members, as Snow Man now has nine members. The performance consists of the first part of the play and the second part of showtime, and lasts approximately 2 hours and 30 minutes, including a 25-minute intermission. Although the composition of the conflict between the members in the juvenile prison was retained, the theme of war is gone from this performance, and the scene of a boy dying in a battlefield is also gone. Hideaki Takizawa, who was in charge of the production, said that this was because Kitagawa was on his sickbed and did not want to include death in the theme at a time when his mind was unstable. Therefore, the content of the previous year's play was drastically changed, and about six minutes after the opening, everyone except Jesse and Iwamoto, who had chosen to remain in prison themselves, escaped from the juvenile prison that had been the main stage of the series so far. Fifty years later, the scene depicted their reunion at a hotel built on the site of a former prison, where they reminisce about the past.

Although it is believed that Kitagawa was responsible for the planning, organization, and overall direction of the project, he has already died, so the members wrote letters about themselves, which were then adopted by the scriptwriter for the script. The hotel is set up 50 years later with a rejuvenation bath, and the series' anuual "tub dance" is performed at a longer length than in previous years. At the end of the first act, the members read letters to the members and fans on a daily basis, and Kitagawa's voice was played on stage. Snow Man and SixTones performed "Cry out" and "RAM-PAM-PAM", respectively. There was a scene called "Switch song's medley" where each group performed each other's song "This Star Light" and "VI Guys Snow Man" interchangeably, ending with ShonenTai's "We'll be Together."

==== September 2019 ====
Place	Tokyo
Date	September 7 – 28
Theatre	Nissay Theatre, Tokyo
Director	Hideaki Takizawa / Johnny Kitagawa
Main cast	Jesse, Taiga Kyomoto, Hokuto Matsumura, Shintaro Morimoto, Juri Tanaka, Yugo Kochi from SixTones; Hikaru Iwamoto, Tatsuya Fukazawa, Shota Watanabe, Ryota Miyadate, Daisuke Sakuma, Ryohei Abe from Snow Man

=== Boys: A Song to You (2021) ===
HiHi Jets and Bishonen starred in this series, which was staged at the Shinbashi Enbujo for the first time. The production was directed by Hideaki Takizawa, but the story itself, which depicted the boys' growth in a juvenile prison, remained the same. The performance lasted about two hours without an intermission, and a 30-minute show time was held after the main performance. In addition to the singing of each group's song, a new performance "Crash Beat" of Takizawa's idea was performed. "Crash Beat" was an eight-minute water fall over performers wearing glowing sunglasses and beating drums. Their anuual "tub dance" also performed.

==== September 2021 ====
Place	Tokyo
Date	September 5 – 27
Theatre	Shinbashi Enbujō, Tokyo
Director	Hideaki Takizawa
Main cast	Yuto Takahashi, Mizuki Inoue, Ryo Hashimoto, Soya Inogari, Ryuto Sakuma from HiHi Jets as prisoner of blue team; Taisho Iwasaki, Ryuga Sato, Yuto Nasu, Hidaka Ukisho, Naoki Fujii, Issei Kanazashi from Bishonen as prisoner of red team

=== Boys: Looking Up at the Sky (2022) ===
HiHi Jets and Bishonen star in this production, which staged at the Shinbashi Enbujo and Misono-za, Nagoya, Aichi Prefecture. The subtitle "Look up at that sky" includes the words "The ground is changing rapidly, but the sky is always the same. By looking at the sky as a meeting place, everyone's hearts are connected." The main visual was released on August 19, 2022, because it showed the performers in casual costumes in front of a blue sky-like background, instead of wearing red and blue work clothes as they did last year, their fans reacted to the poster as fresh and good, and it became "Boys" became a trending topic on Twitter.

The eleven boys imprisoned in two cells, red led by Iwasaki and blue led by Takahashi, spent most of their time fighting, but when their younger brother, who suffers from heart disease, is in critical condition, they ask to leave the prison temporarily, but are not accepted. The story is about the boy's growth while exploding with rebellion against adults and society. This year's production consists of two acts and lasts approximately two and a half hours. At the offer of Hideaki Takizawa, who directed the production, Hiroki Uchi played the role of the prison officer chief, who did not appear last year, adding depth to the story. In addition to the "tub dance" in the bathing scene performed as in previous years, the basketball acrobatics were suddenly back for the first time in three years since 2019, when Snow Man and SixTones starred in the show. In the showtime of the second act, HiHi Jets performed "Drop Music" (choreographed by Soya Inogari), Bishonen performed "Compass," and Uchi also performed "Never say good-bye."

==== 2022 ====
Place	Tokyo	Aichi
Date	September 11 – October 13	October 28 – November 6
Theatre	Shinbashi Enbujō, Tokyo	Misono-za, Aichi
Director	Hideaki Takizawa	
Main cast	Yuto Takahashi, Mizuki Inoue, Ryo Hashimoto, Soya Inogari, Ryuto Sakuma from HiHi Jets as prisoner of blue team; Taisho Iwasaki, Ryuga Sato, Yuto Nasu, Hidaka Ukisho, Naoki Fujii, Issei Kanazashi from Bishonen as prisoner of red team; Hiroki Uchi as prison guard chief	

=== Boys: Through the Darkness (2023) ===
Performed at Shinbashi Enbujo with Bishonen in the lead role. Since Hideaki Takizawa left the Johnny's at the end of October 2022, this performance was composed and directed by Hikaru Iwamoto of Snow Man. This is the first time for Iwamoto to direct a play by himself. He also narrated the opening of the play. Due to the influence of Johnny Kitagawa's sexual abuse coming to light this year, his name, which had been listed in the end credits as "Eternal Producer" since Kitagawa's death in 2019, was removed from this performance.

The performance lasted approximately 2 hours and 40 minutes including intermission. Although the main plot remains the same, that fellows who meet in a juvenile prison develop a bond with each other, The setting is set several decades in the near future, and the story is about a group of boys who are arrested in the chaos of war-torn Japan or imprisoned in a juvenile prison for committing crimes to survive, and who decide to escape from the prison who rules with violence and their unreasonable circumstances. The war scene at the beginning of the film was taken from the actual Russian invasion of Ukraine. Note that the "tub dance," which was an annual performance of this series, was cut in this production in light of recent circumstances. Also, one of the highlights of the show is a scene in which two rival boys face off against each other in a giant skipping rope competition. In the showtime of the second act after the main program, in addition to "Jirettante Ne" by Jr. and "Too Simple Love Song" by Uchis, the bishonen performed a new song "Flicky" (choreographed by Hikaru Iwamoto).

==== 2023 ====
Place	Tokyo
Date	October 4 – 28
Theatre	Shinbashi Enbujō, Tokyo
Director	Hikaru Iwamoto from Snow Man
Main cast	Taisho Iwasaki as new prisoner; Ryuga Sato, Hidaka Ukisho as prisoner of red team; Naoki Fujii, Yuto Nasu, Issei Kanasashi as prisoner of blue team; Hiroki Uchi

== Related products ==
=== Record/CD ===
- Boys – A Little Resistance – (1969, CBS Sony / 2007, Sony Music Entertainment Japan): A Four Leaves record released on December 5, 1969. It is the musical work on which the stage play Boys was based, and a reissue was released on CD on August 15, 2007.

=== DVD ===
- Boys: Prison without Bars (2011 Elov-Label) 2010 version
- Boys: Jail in the Sky (2013 Pony Canyon) 2012 version

== See also ==
- Ninja Drones? – a film adaptation of the musical production Boys.
- Playzone – annual musical theatre starring Shonentai and their juniors that had continued since 1986 to 2015.
- Shock – annual musical theatre starring Koichi Domoto, performed from 2000 to 2024.
- Dream Boy – a musical theatre about boxing that has continued since 2004 with different stars of Johnny & Associates and Starto Entertainment.
