= Juri Tanaka =

Juri Tanaka 田中樹
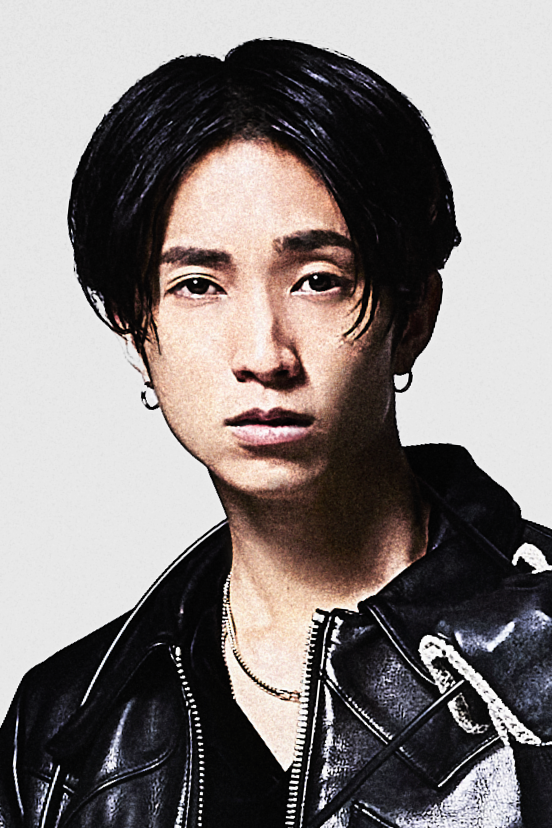

Background information
- Born: June 15, 1995 (age 31); Kashiwa, Japan
- Genre: J-pop
- Occupations: Talento, Television Presenter, Rapper
- Years active: 2008–present
- Labels: Sony Music Entertainment Japan; Starto Entertainment; Johnny & Associates
- Member of: SixTONES
- Formerly of: Johnny's Jr.

Juri Tanaka (田中樹, Tanaka Juri; born June 15, 1995), is a Japanese idol, television presenter, rapper, actor, and talento. He is a member of the boy group SixTONES under Starto Entertainment, formerly known as Johnny & Associates.

== Background ==
Juri Tanaka was born on June 15, 1995, in Kashiwa, Chiba Prefecture, Japan. He is the second youngest of five siblings. His older brother is Koki Tanaka, former member of KAT-TUN also under Johnny & Associates.

== Career ==
In 2007, Tanaka acted in Tanaka Express No. 3 as the younger version of the main character Ichiro Tanaka (played by Koki Tanaka).

Tanaka joined Johnny & Associates on April 20, 2008, after his mother submitted an application and after passing an audition and dancing as a backup dancer at a Hey! Say! JUMP concert, he was placed in the Junior's branch of the company that manages talent that has not debuted. In 2012, he costarred in Shiritsu Bakaleya Koukou with future SixTones groupmates Yugo Kochi, Jesse, Shintaro Morimoto, Hokuto Matsumura, and Taiga Kyomoto. Along with SixTones, Tanaka has starred in other musical stage shows such as Shounentachi between 2015 and 2017 with fellow Johnny's Jr. group Snow Man. In 2016, Tanaka starred in his first role as Hideo Matsunaga in Vanilla Boy: Tomorrow Is Another Day with Matsumura and Jesse.

Tanaka debuted with SixTones in 2020. In 2023, Tanaka played Naoya Katayama in the television drama Tanshin Hanabi airing on TV Asahi. In 2024, Tanaka played Ui Saito in the television and movie series Acma: Game, based on a manga series of the same name. In the same year, Tanaka co-hosted his first broadcast television series with labelmate Shori Sato in Abekobe Danshi no Matsu Heya de where Sato and Tanaka, with the assistance of two other host, showcase how their personalities are "complete opposites" and also attempt to work together to find ways to interview their guests in a comfortable setting.

== Filmography ==
=== Television Dramas ===
Year	Title	Role	Notes	Ref.
2007	Tanaka Express No.	Young Ichiro Tanaka		
2012	Shiritsu Bakaleya Koukou	Satoshi Noguchi		
2019	Black School	Michiro Matsumoto		
2022	Ukiwa: Tomodachi Ijo, Furin Miman	Yu Tamiya		
2023	Tanshin Hanabi	Naoya Katayama		
2024	Acma: Game	Ui Saito		

=== Film ===
Year	Title	Role	Notes	Ref.
2012	Shiritsu Bakaleya Koukou: The Movie	Satoshi Noguchi		
2014	Kamen Teacher SP	Eita Kagura		
2016	Vanilla Boy: Tomorrow Is Another Day	Hideo Matsunaga		
2019	Ninja Drones?	Jyouhoya / No. 482		
2019	Black School Rules	Michiro Matsumoto	Movie Sequel to Black School	
2024	Gekijo Ban: Acma:Game - Saigo no Kagi	Ui Saito	Lead	

=== Television ===
Year	Title	Notes	Ref.
2024	Abekobe Danshi no Matsu Heya	Co-Host	
