= Ninja Drones? =

- Promotional poster
- Kanji: 少年たち
- Revised Hepburn: Shōnentachi
- Directed by: Katsuhide Motoki
- Screenplay by: Katsumi Ishikawa
- Based on: Boys by Johnny Kitagawa
- Produced by: Hiroyuki Saito
- Starring: Jesse; Taiga Kyomoto; Yugo Kochi; Hikaru Iwamoto; Tatsuhiko Fukazawa; You Yokoyama
- Cinematography: Yasuhiko Minamino
- Edited by: Isao Kawase
- Music by: Masahiro Hasegawa
- Production company: Shochiku Studio
- Distributed by: Shochiku
- Release date: March 29, 2019 (Japan)
- Running time: 104 minutes
- Country: Japan
- Language: Japanese
- Box office: $2,791,948 (Japan)

Shonentachi (Japanese: 少年たち, Hepburn: Shōnentachi; lit. Boys), also known as Ninja Drones? and Juveniles, is a 2019 Japanese musical film distributed by Shochiku, a film version of musical theatre production Boys which has been running since 1969. The film was directed by Katsuhide Motoki, written by Katsumi Ishikawa, and executive produced by Johnny Kitagawa.

== Overview ==
This production is an adaptation of musical theatre Boys, which has been staged since 1969 and is based on the musical theater that has been performed mainly by young trainees starring in the show before their debut since it was revived in 2010 with Kis-My-Ft2 and A.B.C-Z in the lead roles. In this production, the red team was performed by SixTones, the blue team by Snow Man, and the black team by Kansai trainees such as Daigo Nishihata and Koji Mukai. Since this is a musical film, song and dance are woven throughout. At the end of the film, there is a gorgeous musical show time where all the trainees perform and dance.

== Story ==
The setting is a Nara juvenile prison, 2012. Orphan Jun (Taiga Kyomoto) has come to prison newly accused of beating and injuring a hoodlum. In the prison, the boys in the red team and the blue team fight each other every day. The boys in the black team look at the two bickering teams with amusement. Jun is assigned to the red team and shares a room with Joe (Jesse), the leader of the red team, and Egao (Yugo Kochi). Joe and Kota (Hikaru Iwamoto), the leader of the blue team, are rivals who fight each other whenever they see each other. Joe's mother was seriously ill. Blue Team Tusk (Tatsuya Fukazawa) had a wife and was about to give birth. At first, Jun is closed-minded, but as he comes into contact with Joe, a reliable man with a strong personality, and Egao, a kind man, he gradually develops a sense of camaraderie and friendship with them. One day, a new prison guard chief, Nakabayashi (You Yokoyama), arrives. He was once beaten by the boys in the prison and has a disability in one of his legs. Nakabayashi begins to dominate the boys with cruelty and harshness. The atmosphere in the prison worsens, and the boys, thinking of their families and friends, plan to escape from prison.

== Production ==
=== Development ===
According to producer Hiroyuki Saito, Shochiku had produced a film about the Kansai trainees since 2013, and the theater department of Shochiku approached him with the idea of making a film of this piece as well. However, there was an opinion that the stage work should remain on stage, and it did not happen right away. 2017 came and Saito heard that the former Nara Prison was going to be renovated and turned into a hotel. Kitagawa and he agreed that it would be the perfect place to shoot this work, so they contacted Ministry of justice and went to visit, and the talk of making a film became a reality. At the time, the stage version of Boys included a war story, but Saito did not include it in the film version because he felt that the war-related parts could not be depicted in a half-hearted manner. War is still happening today, and if it is to be depicted, it must be placed at the center of the story. This time, however, he was more concerned with the world in which the boys of today's Japan live and work. The tire swing in the film was inherited from a setting from the 1960s and 1970s, when the Four Leaves starred in the theatre. For the show scene in the latter half of the film, Kitagawa proposed the development of "rebirth," and the film was created based on this proposal. Director Katsuhide Motoki said that when he first received the offer, he was concerned about whether it could really be made into a movie, but he was curious because it was a stage piece that Kitagawa had been doing for 50 years. He said that the staff spent two months preparing for the 8-minute, one-cut musical scene at the beginning of the film, and he was surprised that the performers learned the choreography so quickly.

=== Filming ===
The former Nara Prison is one of the five major prisons built during the Meiji Era in Japan and was designated as an Important Cultural Property in 2017. When Kitagawa heard that the facility was to be renovated into a hotel, he thought, "If this is the place, we can film the real Boys" and coordinated with various agencies, which led to the filming of the movie. This was the first time a film was shot at the former Nara Prison. Filming took place from February 2018. On some snowy days, it was so cold that Jesse had to wear about 20 hand warmers on his body for the filming. Cast member Daigo Nishihata also filmed in a spring setting during the cold weather, wearing a half sleeve outfit. Hokuto Matsumura said, “It was very cold during the shoot, but I think that's why I was able to act out the reality of spending time in a real prison." Yugo Kochi, who is not good at dancing, was under tremendous pressure not to fail in the 8-minute musical scene at the beginning of the film, as he was to appear around the 7-minute mark, but he was able to finish the filming in one take without failure.

== Reception ==
=== Release ===
It was released in 158 theaters nationwide in Japan on March 29, 2019, and ranked 8th in the nationwide movie attendance ranking on March 30 and 31. It ranked first in the Pia Movie First Day Satisfaction Ranking. At the suggestion of Johnny Kitagawa, an experimental experiment entitled "Movie and Demonstration" was held exclusively at Marunouchi Piccadilly, where performers appeared at random and gave live performances for a total of 34 times over a 10-day period from March 29 to April 7, the day the movie was released, the number of applications reached 1.1 million for the 30,000 seats in the auditorium. In addition, from April 13, cheering goods and penlights were allowed to be brought to the screening, and on April 15, a total of 53 members of trainees performed the song at the “Encore Screening of 'Shonentachi?' Movie and Demonstration” held at Marunouchi Piccadilly, which was shown at 155 theaters nationwide through live viewing. It was shown via live viewing. The film was entered in the Panorama section of the 9th Beijing International Film Festival, which opened on April 13, 2019, and Jesse took the stage on April 14 at the China Film Archive for a screening with a stage greeting, representing the cast, and also gave a speech in Mandarin Chinese. 600 tickets sold out in 2 minutes after they went on sale. As executive producer Johnny Kitagawa died on July 9, 2019, the film was screened again on August 16 of the same year as a memorial screening. The film grossed $758,772 at the opening and $2,791,948 overall.

=== Critical reception ===
The official page of Shochiku, the production company, says, "This film is serious, but all cast sing and dance! It is neither a music video nor an Indian film." As can be seen from its introduction, the film received mixed reviews after its release. Writer Kaeru Inaka analyzes that with Johnny Kitagawa as the executive producer, he would have had a stronger authority over the film than the director Motoki. The film is set in a juvenile prison, but the content is old-fashioned and reminds one of the Showa era, lacking in reality, and he criticizes the use of dialogue and reminiscences to explain everything, which is not cinematic. He also said that the musical parts were only used to make use of the actors' coolness, rather than to attract a sense of unity. Blogger Yuzu also said that the film's setting was old-fashioned and that it was impossible for it to be in 2012. She analyzed the film as a visualization of Johnny Kitagawa's indelible scene of his childhood, assuming that it was set in Japan about 50 years ago, when juvenile crimes were common. However, she said that the gorgeous show featuring all the trainees at the end of the film was worth seeing. RealSound Editor Yui Sato said that it would be nonsense to review this work by saying that the story is not coherent or that the direction is not right, and analyzed it as a typical Johnny's work that depicts the momentary beauty and preciousness of boys who will gradually become adults. She said that each episode is sudden and rough, and it is difficult to understand everything on the first viewing, but it is a work that makes one want to watch it again to understand it better. In particular, he noted that the three main characters played by Taiga Kyomoto, Jesse, and Hikaru Iwamoto were fascinating and worthy of attention.

== Cast/Staff ==
=== Cast ===
- Red team
  - Jesse from SixTones as Joe (N°112)
  - Taiga Kyomoto from SixTones as Jun (N°264)
  - Yugo Kochi from SixTones as Egao (N°18)
  - Juri Tanaka from SixTones as Information broker (N°482)
  - Hokuto Matsumura from SixTones as Daiken (N°391)
  - Shintaro Morimoto from SixTones as Hiroto (N°7)
- Blue team
  - Hikaru Iwamoto from Snow Man as Kota (N°501)
  - Tatsuya Fukazawa from Snow Man as Tasuku (N°55): His wife is about to give birth.
  - Shota Watanabe from Snow Man as Ryou (N°189)
  - Ryohei Abe from Snow Man as Host (N°131)
  - Ryota Miyadate from Snow Man as Shunsoku (N°66)
  - Daisuke Sakuma from Snow Man as Maru (N°9)
- Black team
  - Daigo Nishihata as Sumitani (N°16)
  - Koji Mukai as Tatsuya (N°240)
  - Ryuta Muro as Kenta (N°91)
  - Yoshinori Masakado as Shogo (N°305)
  - Ken Kojima as Masaki(N°11)
- Kaito Miyachika as Hayato: A boy who was Jun's best friend.
- Shota Totsuka as Miyazaki: Child welfare worker in charge of Jun.
- You Yokoyama as Nakabayashi

=== Staff ===
- Executive Producer : Johnny Kitagawa
- Director : Katsuhide Motoki
- Screenplay : Katsumi Ishikawa
- Script Cooperation: Namio Kawanami, Kenji Takami
- Music: Masahiro Hasegawa
- Photography: Yasuhiko Minamino
- Lighting: Toshinori Egawa
- Art Director: Daisuke Sue
- Sound Recording: Kazuhiro Kurihara, Satoru Matsumoto
- Editing: Isao Kawase (J.S.E.)
- Assistant Director: Masanori Inoue
- Choreography: Sanche
- Special Cooperation: Ministry of Justice
- Planning Cooperation: J.S.E.
- Distribution: Shochiku
- Production Production: Shochiku Studio
- Production: Shonentachi Film Partners (Shochiku, J Storm)

== See also ==
- Boys, a series of musicals set in a juvenile prison, which premiered in 1969.

== Related products ==
=== DVD/Blu-ray ===
- Shonentachi? (Japanese: 少年たち, Hepburn: Shōnentachi), December 4, 2019 Release
  - Blu-ray and DVD, SHBR-0602, Storm Labels
  - 2 DVD, DASH-0055, Storm Labels
