= Taiga Kyomoto =

Taiga Kyomoto 京本 大我
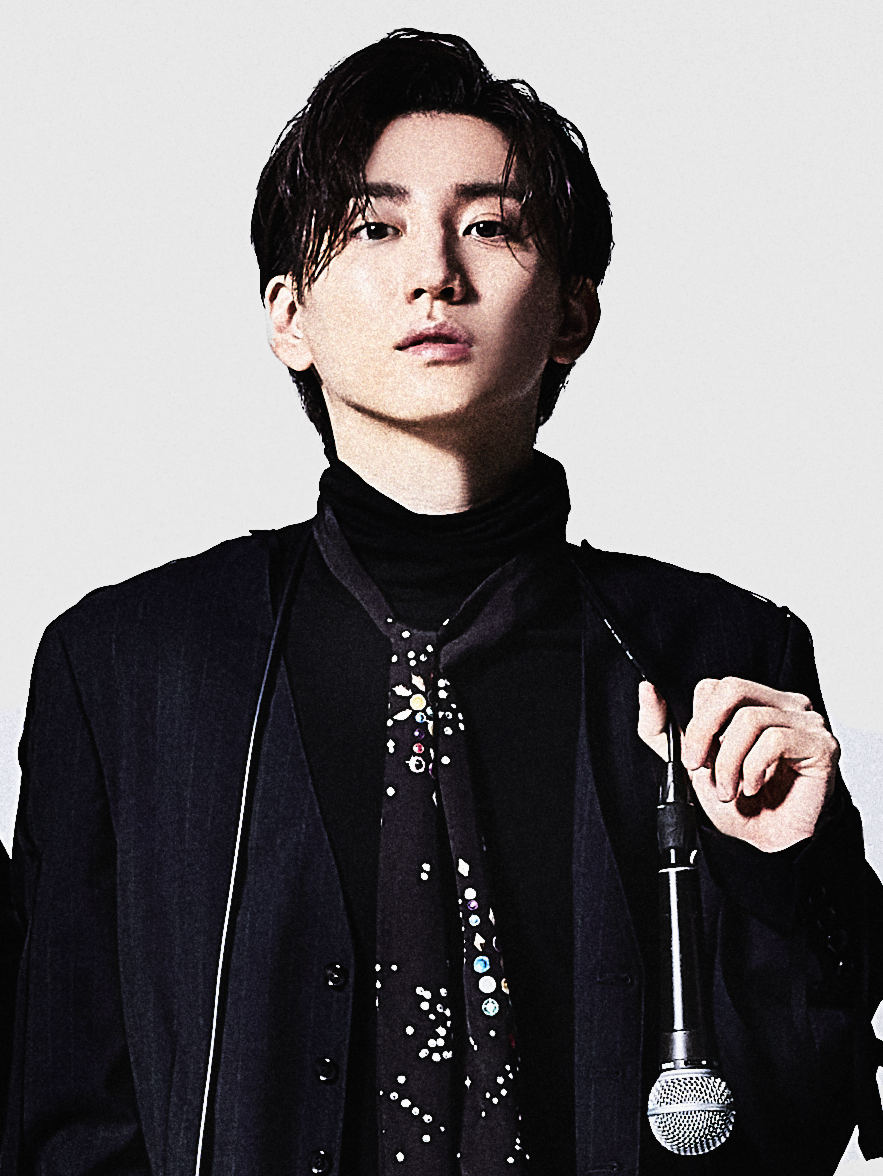
- 2022

Background information
- Born: December 3, 1994 (age 31); Tokyo, Japan
- Genres: J-pop
- Occupations: Singer, actor, talento
- Years active: 2006–present
- Labels: Sony Music Entertainment Japan; Starto Entertainment; Johnny & Associates
- Member of: SixTones
- Formerly of: Johnny's Jr.

Taiga Kyomoto (京本 大我, Kyomoto Taiga; born December 3, 1994), is a Japanese idol, singer, actor, and talento. He is a member of the boy group SixTones under Starto Entertainment, formerly known as Johnny & Associates.

== Background ==
Kyomoto comes from a prominent family of entertainers. His father is actor, tarento, singer and guitarist Masaki Kyomoto and former actress, idol, singer and tarento Hiromi Yamamoto. He is cousins once removed with musical actor and singer songwriter Teppei Koike.

== Career ==
Kyomoto joined Johnny & Associates on May 4, 2006, after being scouted by Johnny & Associates founder Johnny Kitagawa and was placed in the Junior's branch of the company that manages talent that has not debuted. In 2012, he costarred in Shiritsu Bakaleya Koukou with future SixTones groupmates Yugo Kochi, Jesse, Shintaro Morimoto, Hokuto Matsumura, and Juri Tanaka. He was part of several pre-debut groups before being placed in SixTones in 2015. In the same year, he also appeared in productions of Elisabeth as Rudolf, Crown Prince of Austria. Along with SixTones, Kyomoto has starred in other musical stage shows such as Boys between 2015 and 2017 with fellow Johnny's Jr. group Snow Man.

Kyomoto debuted with SixTones in 2020. In 2022, his first starring role was in Tsukanoma no Ichika as Yurugi Akifumi, a university philosophy lecturer. Since debut, he has continued to act in musicals, starring as Jack in Newsies, Guy Foucher in The Umbrellas of Cherbourg and Wolfgang Amadeus Mozart in Mozart!.

On September 3, 2024, he announced his multimedia music focused project "ART-PUT" consisting of music videos, a photo book, and exhibition that "takes various inputs from his daily life and sublimates them into music and other forms of art."

== Filmography ==
=== Television ===
| Year | Title | Role | Notes | Ref. |
|---|---|---|---|---|
| 2012 | Shiritsu Bakaleya Koukou | Maya Terakawa | | |
| 2014 | Kamen Teacher | Bon | | |
| 2015 | Oniichan, Gacha | Gentle Brother | | |
| 2022 | Tsukanoma no Ichika | Yurugi Akifumi | Lead | |
| 2024 | Omukae Shibuya-Kun | Taikai Shibuya | Lead | |

=== Film ===
| Year | Title | Role | Notes | Ref. |
|---|---|---|---|---|
| 2012 | Bakaleya High School | Tetsuya Asada | | |
| 2012 | Shiritsu Bakaleya Koukou: The Movie | Maya Terakawa | | |
| 2014 | Kamen Teacher the Movie | Bon | | |
| 2019 | Ninja Drones? | Jun Awata (N° 264) | | |
| 2022 | Tang and Me | Shinji Hayashibara | | |
| 2024 | Secret: A Hidden Score | Minato | Lead | |
| 2025 | The Girl Who Sees | Zen Tohno | | |

=== Musical theatre ===
| Year | Title | Role | Notes | Ref. |
|---|---|---|---|---|
| 2015/ 2016/ 2019 | Elisabeth | Rudolf | | |
| 2021 | Newsies (musical) | Jack | | |
| 2023 | The Umbrellas of Cherbourg | Guy Foucher | | |
| 2024 | Mozart! | Wolfgang Amadeus Mozart | | |

== Solo project Art Put ==
=== Albums ===
| Title | Album details | Peak chart positions | | Sales |
| Title | Album details | JPN | JPN Hot | Sales |
|---|---|---|---|---|
| Prot.30 | Released: April 23, 2025; Label: Sony Music Entertainment Japan; Formats: CD, CD+DVD, CD+Blu-ray, digital download | 1 | 3 | JPN: 114,814 |

=== Music videos ===
| Year | Title | Notes | Ref. |
|---|---|---|---|
| 2024 | "Taiga Kyomoto Prelude" | | |
