= Bakaleya High School =

2012 Japanese film

- Original title: 劇場版 私立バカレア高校
- Directed by: Takashi Kubota
- Screenplay by: Yuko Matsuda
- Story by: Yasushi Akimoto
- Based on: Shiritsu Bakaleya Koukou
- Produced by: Hiroyuki Ueno; Tetsuya Sakashita
- Starring: Shintaro Morimoto; Hokuto Matsumura; Haruka Shimazaki
- Production companies: D.N. dreampartners; VAP; J DREAM; AKS; Yasushi Akimoto Co. Office; Hakuhodo DY Media Partners; SHOWGATE
- Distributed by: SHOWGATE
- Release date: October 13, 2012 (Japan)
- Running time: 92 minutes
- Country: Japan
- Language: Japanese

Bakaleya High School (Japanese: 劇場版 私立バカレア高校, Hepburn: Gekijōban Shiritsu Bakaleya Kōkō) is a 2012 Japanese youth drama film directed by Takashi Kubota. The film is a continuation of the Japanese television drama Shiritsu Bakaleya Kōkō. It was released in Japan on October 13, 2012.

== Cast ==
=== Main ===
- Shintaro Morimoto as Tatsuya Sakuragi
- Hokuto Matsumura as Tetsuya Asada
- Haruka Shimazaki as Fumie Shingyoji

=== Supporting ===
- Mina Ōba as Saya Ushiromiya
- Taiga Kyomoto as Maya Terakawa
- Juri Tanaka as Satoshi Noguchi
- Yugo Kochi as Makoto Jinbo
- Jesse as Yuuki Satonaka
- Yuya Takaki as Shohei Tatsunami
- Kaoru Mitsumune as Sayuri Tokimune
- Mariya Nagao as Mana Honjo
- Marina Kobayashi as Reika Zaizen
- Haruka Shimada as An Miyata
- Mariko Nakamura as Kaori Shinohara

== Production ==
The screenplay was written by Yuko Matsuda, and the story is credited to Yasushi Akimoto. The film adapts and expands the narrative of Shiritsu Bakaleya Kōkō, a Japanese television drama series that aired on NTV in 2012. The television series itself combined cast members from Johnny's Jr. and AKB48.
