= Acma: Game =

Japanese manga series

- First tankōbon volume cover
- Manga
- Written by: Meeb
- Illustrated by: Kōji Megumi
- Published by: Kodansha
- English publisher: US: Kodansha (digital)
- Imprint: Shōnen Magazine Comics
- Magazine: Weekly Shōnen Magazine
- Original run: April 10, 2013 – April 17, 2017
- Volumes: 22
- Television drama
- Directed by: Tōya Satō; Shunsuke Kariyama; Kento Matsuda
- Written by: Yoshihiro Izumi; Junichirō Taniguchi
- Music by: Yugo Kanno
- Studio: Nippon Television
- Licensed by: Amazon Prime Video
- Original network: NNS (Nippon TV)
- Original run: April 7, 2024 – June 9, 2024
- Episodes: 10
- Live-action film

Acma: Game: The Final Key
- Directed by: Tōya Satō
- Written by: Yoshihiro Izumi; Junichirō Taniguchi
- Released: October 25, 2024
- icon

Acma: Game (stylized in all caps) is a Japanese manga series written by Meeb and illustrated by Kōji Megumi. It was serialized in Kodansha's shōnen manga magazine Weekly Shōnen Magazine from April 2013 to March 2017, with its chapters collected in 22 tankōbon volumes. A television drama adaptation premiered in April 2024. A live-action film, titled Acma: Game: The Final Key, premiered in October of the same year.

== Media ==
=== Manga ===
Written by Meeb and illustrated by Kōji Megumi, Acma: Game was serialized in Kodansha's shōnen manga magazine Weekly Shōnen Magazine from April 10, 2013, to March 8, 2017. Kodansha collected its chapters in 22 tankōbon volumes, released from June 17, 2013, to April 17, 2017.

Kodansha started publishing the series digitally in English on its K Manga service in 2023.

==== Volumes ====
No.	Release date	ISBN
1	June 17, 2013	978-4-06-384887-8
2	September 17, 2013	978-4-06-394932-2
3	November 15, 2013	978-4-06-394969-8
4	January 17, 2014	978-4-06-394999-5
5	March 17, 2014	978-4-06-395033-5
6	June 17, 2014	978-4-06-395109-7
7	August 16, 2014	978-4-06-395164-6
8	October 17, 2014	978-4-06-395220-9
9	December 17, 2014	978-4-06-395266-7
10	March 17, 2015	978-4-06-395348-0
11	May 15, 2015	978-4-06-395395-4
12	July 17, 2015	978-4-06-395436-4
13	September 17, 2015	978-4-06-395486-9
14	November 17, 2015	978-4-06-395535-4
15	January 15, 2016	978-4-06-395584-2
16	March 17, 2016	978-4-06-395621-4
17	May 17, 2016	978-4-06-395672-6
18	July 15, 2016	978-4-06-395713-6
19	September 16, 2016	978-4-06-395763-1
20	December 16, 2016	978-4-06-395828-7
21	February 17, 2017	978-4-06-395872-0
22	April 17, 2017	978-4-06-395919-2

=== Drama ===
In January 2024, it was announced that the manga would receive a television drama adaptation. The drama is directed by Tōya Satō, Shunsuke Kariyama, and Kento Matsuda, with scripts written by Yoshihiro Izumi and Junichirō Taniguchi and music composed by Yugo Kanno. The series stars Shotaro Mamiya as Teruaki Oda, and also features Juri Tanaka of SixTones as Ui Saito and Kotone Furukawa as Yūki Manabe. It was broadcast on Nippon TV from April 7 to June 9, 2024. Amazon Prime Video has licensed the series for worldwide streaming.

=== Film ===
In June 2024, it was announced that a live-action film, titled Acma: Game: The Final Key, was released in theaters on October 25 of the same year.
