= Jimmy: The True Story of a True Idiot =

2018 Japanese-language comedy TV series

- Promotional poster
- Kanji: Jimmy〜アホみたいなホンマの話〜
- Genre: Comedy
- Directed by: Mitsuno Michio
- Starring: Akiyoshi Nakao; Tetsuji Tamayama; Hiroyuki Onoue
- Country of origin: Japan
- Original language: Japanese
- No. of seasons: 1
- No. of episodes: 9

Production
- Running time: 39–64 min

Original release
- Network: Netflix
- Release: July 20, 2018

Jimmy: The True Story of a True Idiot (Jimmy〜アホみたいなホンマの話〜, Jimmy: Aho Mitai na Honma no Hanashi) is a 2018 Japanese-language television series directed by Mitsuno Michio and starring Akiyoshi Nakao, Tetsuji Tamayama and Hiroyuki Onoue. Based on a true story, the plot revolves around simple-minded Hideaki Onishi as he meets series producer and Japanese comedy legend Sanma Akashiya, changes his name to Jimmy, and transforms into a comedy star. Jimmy's comedy leans heavily on slapstick and silly humour, against a backdrop of drama which drives the narrative forward.

It was ordered direct-to-series, and the first full season premiered on Netflix streaming on July 20, 2018.

== Cast ==
- Akiyoshi Nakao as Jimmy Onishi
- Tetsuji Tamayama as Sanma Akashiya
- Hiroyuki Onoue as Shoji Murakami
- Seiji Rokkaku as Mr. Okure
- Shōhei Uno as Totzan
- Shintarō Hazama as Kanpei Hazama
- Yuta Kanai as Shinsuke Shimada
- Chizuru Ikewaki as Shinobu Otake
- Haruka Kinami as Kyōko Takamiya
- Kōichi Satō as Keisuke Miyake
- Takuya Kimura as a comedian (cameo)

== Production ==
Keisuke Koide was originally cast as Sanma, but he was dropped from the project after his underage sex scandal.

== Release ==
The full first season of Jimmy: The True Story of a True Idiot consisting of 9 episodes premiered on Netflix streaming on July 20, 2018.
