= Snow Prince =

2009 film by Joji Matsuoka

- Film poster advertising Snow Prince in Japan
- Directed by: Joji Matsuoka
- Written by: Kawano Emi
- Screenplay by: Kundō Koyama
- Story by: Ouida
- Produced by: Oono Takahiro
- Starring: Shintaro Morimoto; Marino Kuwashima
- Cinematography: Akira Otsuka
- Edited by: Shinichi Hiroshi
- Music by: Shigeru Abe
- Production companies: TV Asahi; Sedic International; Shochiku; J Dream; Dentsu; Asahi Shimbun; Kadokawa Shoten; Tokyo FM; Asahi Broadcasting Corporation; Nagoya Broadcasting Network; Hokkaido Television Broadcasting; Kyushu Asahi Broadcasting; Higashinippon Broadcasting; Hiroshima Home Television; Shizuoka Asahi Television; Yamagata Television System
- Distributed by: Shochiku
- Release date: 12 December 2009 (Japan)
- Running time: 151 minutes
- Country: Japan
- Language: Japanese
- Box office: US$845,375

Snow Prince - Forbidden Love Melody (Japanese: スノープリンス 禁じられた恋のメロディ, Hepburn: Sunō Purinsu: Kinjirareta Koi no Merodii) is a 2009 Japanese film. This film is adapted from the 1872 novel A Dog of Flanders and is inspired by the 1971 film A Small Love Melody. Directed by Joji Matsuoka and written by Kundō Koyama—the scriptwriter for the film Departures, it is a poignant story of a middle class woman's teenage friendship with a poor artist. Shintaro Morimoto plays the role of Sota, the orphan artist who lives with his grandfather, and Marino Kuwashima plays the role of Sota's friend, Sayo. Together, they have to weather the many challenges that come their way because of their lowly social status. Snow Prince marked the film debuts of Morimoto and Kuwashima.

The main and supporting cast of Snow Prince was revealed on 11 May 2009, and the filming subsequently took place at a movie village located in Shōnai, Yamagata from November 2008 to February 2009. The theme song of this film, entitled Snow Prince, was sung by a group of 10 boys including Shintaro Morimoto, the lead actor of this film. This song debuted at the 9th position on the Oricon weekly charts.

Snow Prince had its international debut in Flanders, Belgium, the setting for A Dog of Flanders. It then showcased at the 2009 Hawaii International Film Festival, and subsequently opened in Japanese cinemas on 12 December 2009. The film, which grossed $845,375 in Japan and Singapore, received mixed reviews from critics. Actor Teruyuki Kagawa was nominated for the best supporting actor award at the 52nd Blue Ribbon Awards for his role.

== Plot ==
The film opens when Sayo Arima, a girl brought up in a wealthy family and now an elderly woman, unexpectedly receives a manuscript written by Haigo, a circus clown whom she met many years ago. It deals with the events seventy years earlier when Sayo was friends with Sota, a poor village boy who lived with his grandfather and dreamt of being a painter. The film moves back to that time, when a circus came to the town where Sayo and Sota lived. Despite Sota's grandfather warning him not to go near the circus, Sota goes with Sayo. After the performance, they sneak backstage and are caught by the circus clown Haigo, who kindly gives Sota an egg, which he had intended to buy for his grandfather. Sota believes that the clown can read his mind, and calls him Kamisama, which means "god" in Japanese.

Later, while talking to Sayo's classmates, Sota learns about a legendary paint nicknamed "Night-Sky" which can only be produced from materials unique to a particular pond. Sayo and Sota resolve to find the pond together. However, the route to the pond is dangerous, and involves passing through a train tunnel. In the tunnel Sayo trips and is nearly run over by a train. Sota manages to pull her out just in time, but is scolded by Mr. Arima, Sayo's father, for taking her to such a dangerous place. He tells his wife not to let them meet again. Later, Sota returns to the pond with the circus clown. Sota offers to paint a picture of him, but the clown refuses and advises Sota to paint whatever his heart desires. He decides to paint Sayo playing the piano after he watches Sayo play the "Clair de lune". To save money for the painting paper, Sota goes hungry and eats just a few grains of rice each day. Sota's grandfather dies, and after the funeral, Sota goes to the circus to find solace in the circus clown, only to discover that the circus has moved away.

In the present again, the manuscript the old man brought has ended, and Sayo recounts the rest of the story. Despite the difficulties he faces, Sota manages to complete the painting, which he decides to give to Sayo. He and Chibi go to Sayo's house, where Sayo is having a birthday party with her classmates. Sota gives the painting to Sayo's father, who agrees to pass the painting to Sayo. Sota continues walking in the snow. Just as he settles down to rest, he discovers that Mr. Arima's warehouse is on fire. Sota helps to put out the fire and calls for help. He leaves before Sayo's father arrives, and Mr. Arima launches a manhunt to find Sota to thank him. When this hunt is unsuccessful, Sayo suggests that they look for him at the pond. They find him there, dead. In the present day again, the old man leaves and Sayo starts playing the "Clair de lune" on the piano.

== Cast ==
The actors cast for roles in the film include:

- Shintaro Morimoto as Sota, a poor orphaned boy who lives with his grandfather. He is talented in drawing, and spends much of his time drawing because he cannot afford to go to school. He is frequently accompanied by the dog Chibi, whom he and Sayo found abandoned and injured.
- Marino Kuwashima as Sayo Arima, Sota's soulmate and best friend. She is a member of the wealthy Arima family, and thus her father opposes her relationship with Sota.
- Teruyuki Kagawa as Masamitsu Arima, Sayo's father. He is a rich merchant in the village, and Sota's grandfather works for him. He strongly opposes the relationship between Sota and his daughter Sayo because he hopes that she will marry into a rich family.
- Rei Dan as Kiyo Arima, Sayo's mother. She is caught between her husband's resistance to Sota and her belief in romantic love.
- Maiko as Yasuko Hasegawa, Sayo's granddaughter in the present.
- Manabu Yamamoto as the old man, who delivers the letter which sparks the flashback of this incident. He is also Sota's half-brother and Haigo's son.
- Tadanobu Asano as the circus clown, Haigo. He is also Sota's father, but does not tell him. He helps Sota find the legendary "night-sky" paint, and tells Sota to paint whatever his heart desires.
- Katsuo Nakamura as Masayoshi Harada, Sota's grandfather. He gives many words of wisdom to Sota, and gently advises Sota not to hate anyone or bear any grudges for the circumstances and predicaments in his life. He later dies due to a long-running illness.
- Keiko Kishi as Sayo in the present.

== Production ==
=== Development ===
Snow Prince was directed by Joji Matsuoka, whose previous works include the films Tokyo Tower: Mom and Me, and Sometimes Dad (2007) and Sayonara, Kuro (2003). Kundō Koyama wrote the screenplay of his film. Snow Prince is Kundo Koyama's second work, after his work on the Departures, which won the Best Foreign Language Film award at the 81st Academy Awards.

The film was inspired by the 1872 English novel A Dog of Flanders, written by Marie Louise de la Ramée, and by the film Small Love Melody, both of which were popular with Japanese audiences and well known in Japan. In the movie, an Akita dog was used instead of the Flemish breed used in the novel, and the setting was moved to Yamagata Prefecture in Japan instead of Flanders, Belgium. When asked about these changes, director Joji Matsuoka said that "this film is not specifically shot at any location" and that he used an Akita because it is "representative of Japan". Asahi Shinbun reported that Snow Prince's script was also partly inspired by the script of an anime version of A Dog of Flanders that was released previously.

=== Casting ===
New actor Shintaro Morimoto and new actress Marino Kuwashima were officially revealed as the lead cast members of this film at the film's 10th press conference on 11 May 2009. They were handpicked from a group of 10,000 people in an audition by director Joji Matsuoka. Matsuoka reportedly decided to choose Shintaro and Marino because they "had a different twinkle in their eyes". In particular, Shintaro, the younger brother of Hey! Say! JUMP member Ryutaro Morimoto, was praised by the director, who said that he was looking for a child "who can exist for real". Matsuoka described Shintaro's qualities as "rare nowadays", and also described him as an "angel".

Other notable cast members of the film includes actors Teruyuki Kagawa and Tadanobu Asano, and actress Rei Dan. Actor Teruyuki Kagawa previously starred in films like 20th Century Boys (2009) and Dear Doctor (2009), and was also the two-time recipient of the "Best Supporting Actor" award at 29th and 31st Japan Academy Awards respectively. He has also starred in television series like Mr. Brain (2009) and Diplomat Kosaku Kuroda (2011). In this film, he stars as Masamitsu Arima, the father of Sayo and a rich village merchant. The actor Tadanobu Asano made his debut appearance in the 1990 film Batashi Kingyo, another film that this film's director Joji Matsuoka directed. Asano is also the winner of the "Best Lead Actor" award at the 33rd Japan Academy Awards. He plays the role of the circus clown Haigo, who is also the secret father of Sota, in this film.

=== Filming ===
Scenes of Sota's and the Arima family's houses, the village and the playhouse of Sota and Sayo were shot at the "Shonai Movie Village" (庄内映画村, Shōnai Eigamura) in Shōnai, Yamagata. The filming at this location took place from November 2008 to February 2009. In addition, the scene where Mr. Arima's warehouse caught fire was filmed in "Sakata, Sankyo Sōko" (酒田 山居倉庫), Yamagata Prefecture. The railway tracks in the movie are those of the former "Naruto no Kurikumada Koen Railway Line" (鳴子のくりこま田園鉄道, Naruto no Kurikumada Koen Tetsudō), which used to operate in Miyagi Prefecture. The scene where Sayo played the "Clair de lune" and the ending scene of the film was shot at the former Fukura Elementary School (吹浦小学校, Fukura shōgakkō).

Matsuoka described the filming conditions as "very harsh", but said that "the film was completed thanks to the children" and ended by praising the perseverance of Shintaro and Kuwajima. Shintaro Morimoto said that the scene where the warehouse caught fire "was the scariest scene in the entire film". Fellow actor Maiko also said that when she was seeing Shintaro and Marino acting like lovers, it reminded her of her "first love".

=== Theme song ===
The film's theme song is "Snow Prince" (スノープリンス, Sunō purinsu), and it is sung by the group Snow Prince Gasshōdan (スノープリンス合唱団). This theme song and the formation of the Snow Prince Gasshōdan group was unveiled at an animal welfare organization event on 1 November 2009. Songwriter Shinji Nojima wrote the song's lyrics. "Snow Prince" is a choral song inspired by Claude Debussy's Clair de lune, or the third movement of the Suite bergamasque. The piece "Clair de lune" is also featured in the film.

The Snow Prince Gasshōdan group is a temporary boy choir that was formed specially for this movie, and it is led by actor Shintaro Morimoto. The group comes under the management of Johnny Jr., a Japanese talent agency that specially trains male idols. Snow Prince Gasshōdan is made up of 10 boys, who together, had an average age of 10.5 years at the time of the filming. This makes the group Snow Prince Gasshōdan the youngest group in the history of all the Johnny Jr. idol groups to release a single. According to the movie's release committee, the group Snow Prince Gasshōdan existed until the end of 2010 before it was disbanded. Leader Shintaro Morimoto expressed hope the group could be reunited again after 10 years.

Snow Prince was recorded and released as a single album on 2 December 2009. This single debuted at the ninth position on the weekly Oricon charts, later achieving its peak of the fifth position in the same charts.

== Release ==
Snow Prince had its first special screening in Flanders, Belgium, where the novel A Dog of Flanders was set. This was the first time lead actor Shintaro Morimoto traveled overseas, and he said that, "My heart was beating very fast, but seeing the audience response, I gained more confidence in this film". Morimoto became the spokesperson for the Flanders government's tourism board because he was the lead actor of the film. Snow Prince was then shown in Hawaii, where it made its film festival debut at the Hawaii International Film Festival (HIFF) on 20 October 2009.

The film was then opened in Japan cinemas on 12 December 2009. It was officially released at a ceremony held at Marunouchi Piccadilly in Yurakucho, Tokyo, on 12 December 2009. The entire cast of the film, together with the film's director Joji Matsuoka, were present at the ceremony. Also, at the ceremony, it was revealed to the media that negotiations for the film's distribution rights overseas were ongoing. It was announced that distributors from 25 different countries in Asia and Europe were interested in releasing the films in their home countries, though these were not specifically mentioned. This is a high number as, usually, Japanese films will only receive around 10 to 15 different offers. During its debut weekend, Snow Prince debuted in 234 cinema screens across Japan. It grossed a total of $362,879 in the opening week, making it the 10th highest grossing movie over the weekend of 12 and 13 December. Overall, it earned $837,724 in Japanese cinemas.

In Singapore cinemas, Snow Prince was released on 13 May 2010 by local distributor Cathay-keris Films. It grossed US$4,088 on the first weekend (13–16 May) and US$2,320 on the second weekend (20–23 May), for a total gross of US$7,651 in Singapore cinemas.

The home media for Snow Prince was released in DVD (format 2) and Blu-ray Disc versions. The distributor Toei released the film in Japan on 20 August 2010. In Taiwan, a DVD version of Snow Prince was released on 5 April 2011 under the film's Chinese name of 雪地王子 with Chinese subtitles and Japanese dialog. Later, Snow Prince was showcased at the inaugural Beijing International Film Festival, where it became one of the six Japanese films to be shown on 24 April 2011.

== Soundtrack ==
The single for this film's theme song Snow Prince was released in a limited-edition version and a regular version by Sony Music Entertainment on 2 December 2009.

Snow Prince (Regular Edition)

Soundtrack album by Snow Prince Gasshōdan
- Released: 2 December 2009
- Length: 17 minutes
- Label: Sony Music Entertainment (JECN-211)

=== Soundtrack (limited edition album) ===
The limited-edition version of the single Snow Prince contains a CD and a bonus DVD.

Track list:

1. "Snow Prince" (スノープリンス)
2. "Snow Prince (choral version)" (スノープリンス 合唱版)
3. "Snow Prince (original karaoke)" (スノープリンス (オリジナル・カラオケ))
4. "Snow Prince [choral version] (accompaniment)" (スノープリンス 合唱版 (伴奏))
5. "Snow Prince (music video)" (スノープリンス (ミュージッククリップ)) (DVD)
6. "Snow Prince (Making-of) " (スノープリンス (メイキング)) (DVD)

=== Soundtrack (regular album) ===
Track list:

1. "Snow Prince" (スノープリンス)
2. "Christmas Song Medley" (クリスマスソングメドレー)
3. "Bitter Moon"
4. "Christmas Song Medley (original karaoke version)" (クリスマスソングメドレー (オリジナル・カラオケ))

== Reception ==
=== Critical reception ===
In a pre-release review of the film, Asahi Shimbun's Atsushi Ohara said that "the film has adapted Dog of Flanders well", but he took issue with the treatment of Sota and Chibi, saying that they were treated too harshly. He rounded off his review by saying that the dog acted superbly and was very adorable, and that the scenery in the film had a rare beauty. In another article written by him, he said that the audience should "expect to ponder about the events in this film", and finished by saying that the film allows the audience to gain important messages. In another pre-release review, Nobuko Yamasaki, writing on behalf of Moviewalker, said that Snow Prince was filled with "tears of gratitude" and Shintaro Morimoto's acting was lovely. He also said that the movie 's dog role reminded him of the director's previous work Sayonara, Kuro. He added that he had to take out a handkerchief as he watched the film.

The Japan Times gave Snow Prince a score of 2 out of 5. In the critical review entitled "Weep over this princely pile of slush", Mark Schilling criticized the film as "a weeper that ... left me surprisingly dry eyed" and added that "There's hardly a spark of originality in the entire enterprise, unless you count the casting of Tadanobu Asano – the coolest Japanese actor of his generation – as a sad-but-wise circus clown." Reviewer Matiko Wataru of the "Eiga-Judge" website said that "this innocent and sad tale tragedy of the boy is too simplistic and the screenplay did not do much.". However, the review praised the "beautiful scenery of the city of Shonai" and said the film was a "sad and beautiful combination of children and animals".

The Guardian rated it third on its list of "The top 10 films of 2009 you probably won't have seen". The reviewer, David Parkinson, praised this work as "the most beautiful children's film of the year". He elaborated by saying, "Everything about this poignant account...is exquisite. The photography and period design are impeccable, while the script deftly acquaints younger viewers with the good that can still emerge from the harsher realities of life.". He ended his review with: "This is the kind of family entertainment that Hollywood has long forgotten how to make."

=== Accolades ===
Year	Award	Category	Result	Recipient
2010	52nd Blue Ribbon Award	Best supporting actor	Nominated	Teruyuki Kagawa
2010	Tohoho 10 Worst Films	—N/a	9th place	Snow Prince
