= SixTones =

Japanese boyband

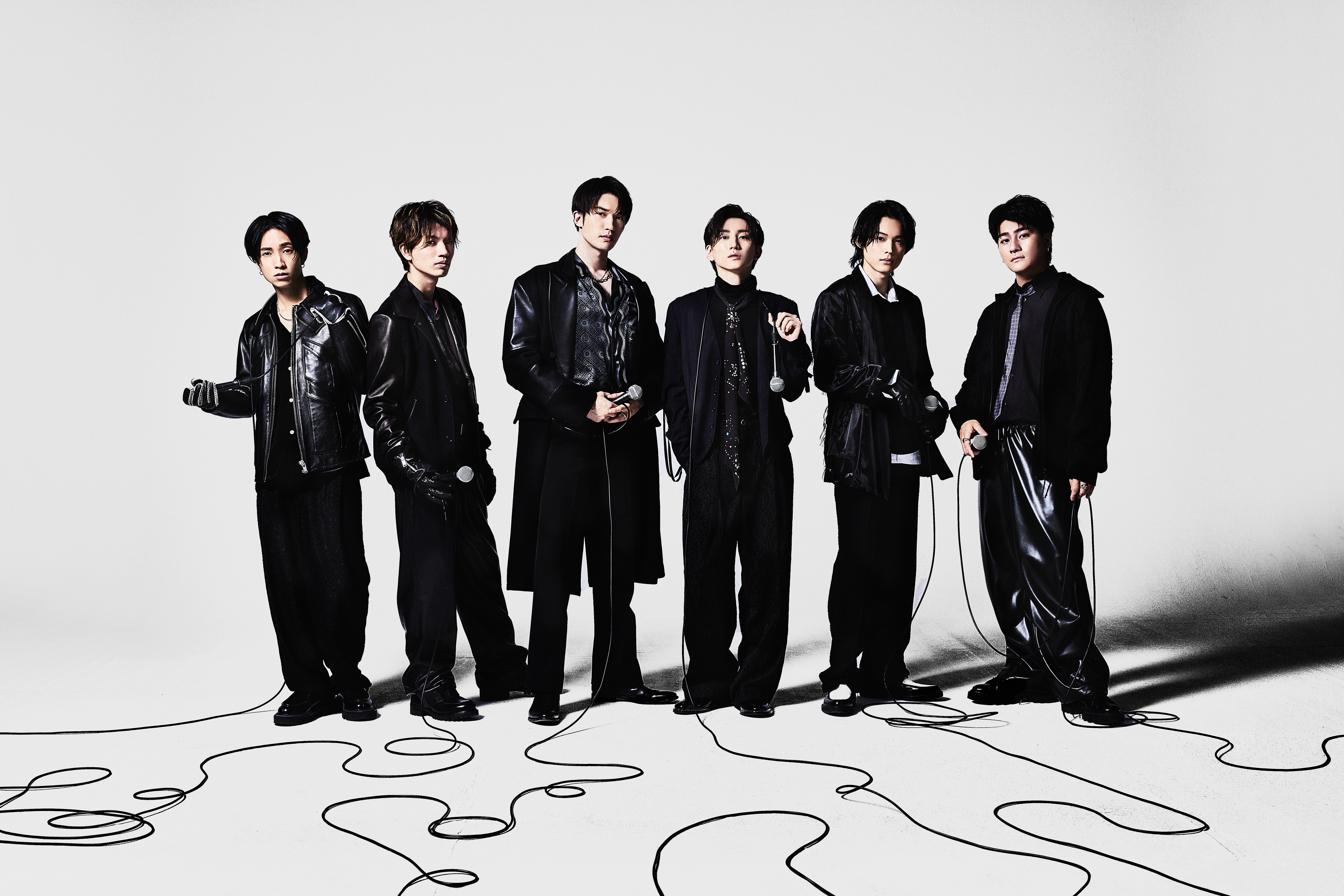

Background information
- Origin: Japan
- Genre: J-pop
- Years active: 2020–present
- Label: Sony Music Entertainment Japan
- Members: Yugo Kochi; Taiga Kyomoto; Juri Tanaka; Hokuto Matsumura; Jesse; Shintaro Morimoto
- Website: www.sixtones.jp

SixTones (ストーンズ, Sutōnzu; stylized as SixTONES and pronounced "Stones") is a Japanese boy band under Starto Entertainment. The group made its official debut on January 22, 2020 under Sony Music Entertainment Japan. As of year, SixTONES has sold over 6.24 million physical records in Japan.

== Name ==
Johnny Kitagawa, the late leader of Johnny & Associates named the group "SixTones". Initially named "Six Tones", the name was later changed to "SixTones" (pronounced "Stones", with the "ix" in "Six" being silent). The "stones" pronunciation refers to "diamond in the rough", where the group's potential emerges as its members continually polish and refine their skills. The name also refers to the six members, each with a distinctive tone, personality and sound.

== History ==
=== 2011–2015: Pre-group formation ===
In 2011, shortly after the debut of Sexy Zone, the members performed as back dancers for A.B.C-Z and Hey! Say! JUMP.

In February 2012, while they were back dancing in A.B.C-Z's ABC Za (Stars) stage play, the group participated on the Nippon Television drama, Shiritsu Bakaleya Koukou (lit. "Private Bakaleya High School"), which was the first drama collaboration between Johnny's talents and AKB48's members. Members reprised their roles in the sequel drama and film Shiritsu Bakaleya Koukou: The Movie (2012). At this point, the six members were not officially formed as a unit, named by fans as Bakareya6 or Bakareya-gumi during the airing of the drama.

A discussion with Johnny Kitagawa, led to announcement of the Johnny's Jr. Johnny's Dome theater: Summary, one of the few performances with Junior's as main at the time. At the years-end Fresh Johnny's Jr. in Yokohama Arena concert, clips of the Shiritsu Bakaleya Koukou drama were shown together with the original soundtrack Shake It Up by Kis-my-ft2.

After a January 2013 cover performance of Kat-Tun's "Six Senses" on Shounen Club, the unofficial Bakareya6 unit disbanded. The group was split into a 2:4 formation, with Jesse and Hokuto Matsumura performing separately from the remaining four members. While the former had numerous appearances, the rest struggled. Some of the limited appearances were individual The Shounen Club ones. Additionally, the previously announced six-member performance at the Live House Johnny's Ginza was changed and the members split into the same 2:4 formation.

In August 2014, five of the members, excluding Jesse, performed at the Johnny's Ginza 2014 shows . The six members reunited for a performance of Kis-my-ft2's "Shake It Up" at Gamushara J's party‼ vol.4 in May 2015. This was their first performance as a six-member-unit after eighteen months. In a magazine interview afterward, Hokuto Matsumura and Taiga Kyomoto said they felt that the show was a closure to their Bakareya era. However, Gamushara J's party!! Vol. 6 was announced in the following month. The members consisted of Genki Iwahashi, Yuta Jinguji, and Yuta Kishi as well as the six members.

Years later, when SixTones talked about their group formation, they revealed that many of the members were planning to quit their agency at that point. Shintaro Morimoto was planning to return to his studies to obtain a teaching license after graduating from high school. Yugo Kochi, Taiga Kyomoto and Juri Tanaka were considering their futures, too. SixTones also revealed that during the that inactive period, the members were brought back together by Jesse, who had expressed the desire to work together as six once again.

=== 2015: Formation of official unit, SixTones ===
In The Shounen Club episode broadcast in January 2015, the six members together performed a cover of Hell No by KAT-TUN. This was the first performance together as six on the show after a two-year gap.

In April 2015, five of the members, excluding Taiga Kyomoto, performed in the Johnny's Ginza 2015 shows. Taiga Kyomoto was in the Elizabeth musical at that time and could not join the show. In order to announce their group name as Six, Taiga Kyomoto rushed over from the Imperial Theatre to the Theatre Creation on 1 May 2015, where the Six members announced their formation as SixTones.

The group name was later changed to SixTones and read as Stones and officially announced in Shounen Club on June 10, 2015. In September 2015, SixTones starred as the main casts in the Boys: Dream of The World...Children Who Don't Know War musical for the first time, together with Snow Man. They performed their first two original songs, Kono Hoshi No HIKARI and BE CRAZY, in the Shounentachi musical.

=== 2016–2019: Pre-debut ===
SixTones held concerts as part of Johnny's Ginza 2016 from May 27 to 30, 2016. In September 2016, SixTones starred as the main cast in The Boys, Crisis! musical for the second time, together with Snow Man.

From February 18 to 26, 2017, SixTones and four Kansai Johnny's Jr. (Daigo Nishihata, Kōji Mukai, Ryusei Onishi and Ryūta Muro) held joint concerts together as part of the East SixTones × West Kansai Johnny's Jr. SHOW Battle. SixTones also held concerts in the Summer Station ~ Kimitachi ga~ KING'S TREASURE shows from 1 to 3 August 2017. In September 2017, SixTones starred as the main cast in the Boys: Born Tomorrow musical with Snow Man for the third consecutive year. The two groups also performed during The Boys Live in Aichi Prefecture, Hyōgo Prefecture, Wakayama Prefecture and Hiroshima that year.

Upon the opening of Johnny's Jr.'s official YouTube channel on 21 March 2018, SixTones were announced to be in charge of each week's Friday content for the channel. In July 2018, SixTones held concerts as part of Summer Paradise 2018, with four additional shows later announced in August 2018.

In October 2018, it was announced that SixTones were chosen for YouTube's first Japanese Artist Promotion Campaign for emerging artists that YouTube launched in several countries. The staff working with SixTones on their weekly Johnny's Jr. Channel content recommended them to be part of the campaign. The president of the YouTube headquarters in California then contacted Johnny & Associates directly to offer SixTones the opportunity to be part of the campaign.

On November 5, 2018, SixTones released their first music video, "Japonica Style", as part of the campaign on the Johnny's Jr. Channel. The music video was produced by Hideaki Takizawa while the costuming and styling were provided by the woman's fashion magazine, CanCam. On November 16, 2018, the group held its first YouTube Livestream at YouTube Space Tokyo, which was also the first YouTube Livestream held by talents of Johnny & Associates. SixTones later went on to perform at Japan's first YouTube FanFest Music on December 11.

At the Johnny's Jr. 8.8 Festival〜Tokyo Dome Kara Hajimaru〜 on August 8, 2019, it was announced that SixTones would release their debut single in 2020. Additionally, the group also opened an official Instagram account and announced their graduation from Johnny's Jr. Channel with the opening of their own YouTube Artist Channel at 10:00 p.m. JST the same day.

Together with Travis Japan, SixTones is the first talent group of Johnny & Associates to open an official Instagram account, as well as the first talent group of Johnny & Associates to have their own YouTube Channel.

=== 2020–2022: Debut, 1st, City ===
SixTones made their debut on January 22, 2020, with a double A-side CD single with another Johnny's group Snow Man called "SixTones vs Snow Man" with SixTones' track being "Imitation Rain". "Imitation Rain" was composed and arranged by X Japan's Yoshiki, and sold 772,902 CD copies in a single day, with it eventually crossing one million in following days, topping the Oricon Chart. On July 22, 2020, SixTones released another album single titled "Navigator", which was used as the opening of The Millionaire Detective Balance: Unlimited. Another song, "New Era", was released on November 11, 2020, and was used as the first opening of Yashahime: Princess Half-Demon.

SixTones released their first album, 1ST on 6 January 2021. The album was released in three editions: Rough Edition, Tone Colors, and the regular edition. The album topped both the Oricon Albums Chart and Billboard Japan Hot Albums Chart, selling over 467,000 copies in Japan in its first week. They released their second album, City, on January 5, 2022. City includes their fourth album single, "Boku wa Boku Janai Mitai Da", released on February 17, 2021, and their fifth single, "Mascara", released on August 11, 2021. "Boku wa Boku Janai Mitai Da" was used as the theme song for the movie LiarxLiar, which Hokuto Matsumura played a lead role in. "Mascara" was written and produced by King Gnu's Daiki Tsuneta. One song from the album, "Rosy", was used as the theme song for the Japanese dub of Spider-Man: No Way Home.

SixTones released their second album, City, on January 5, 2022. The album was released in three editions: the regular edition, first edition A and first edition B. The album topped the Oricon Albums Chart in the week after its release.

On January 1, 2022, SixTones appeared on the YouTube channel, The First Take, performing an orchestral arrangement of their debut song, "Imitation Rain". With over 120,000 people watching the premiere, they set a record on the channel for the most views during a premiere, as well as became the first group from Johnny & Associates to appear on the channel. On January 12, they appeared on the channel a second time, performing a song from City, "Everlasting".

=== 2023–present: Yoshiki: Under the Sky, first five dome tour ===
In 2023, SixTones collaborated with Yoshiki to perform "Imitation Rain" in the documentary film Yoshiki: Under the Sky.

On September 15, 2024, SixTones had their first signature program special. In "SixTONES no kyō kara producers", the members work as trainee producers in a small amusement park's 70th anniversary event in Gunma, and attempt to produce "the most delicious draft beer" assisted by Hiromi. A second program, called "Game of SixTONES", a game and talk show, aired the following week. The latter aired also as a New Year special in 2025. These programs were previous to their program "Golden SixTones", started in April.

On November 15, 2024, SixTones reported on their SNS that they would be holding their first "five dome tour" in 2025, starting with Tokyo Dome on January 24, visiting Fukuoka, Osaka, Hokkaido, and ending in Aichi on April 14. "SixTones Live Tour 2025 'Young Old'" consisted of a total of 13 performances in the cities previously mentioned.

On February 28, 2025, it was revealed that SixTones were awarded the MTV VMAJ "Group of the Year" award, which they received at the ceremony on March 19, where they also performed live.

On January 19, 2026, "Ichibyou", Nippon Television's cheer song during the 2026 Winter Olympics, was announced on News Zero.

== Members ==
- Yugo Kochi
- Taiga Kyomoto
- Juri Tanaka
- Hokuto Matsumura
- Jesse
- Shintaro Morimoto

SixTONES has no permanent leader. The leader role rotates annually, with one member serving as leader for that year, chosen by rock paper scissors at the beginning of each year.

== Discography ==
SixTones discography
- Studio albums: 6
- Compilation albums: 1
- Singles: 18
- Video albums: 7

=== Studio albums ===
Title	Information	Peak chart positions	First week sales	Certifications
Title	Information	Oricon	First week sales	Certifications
1ST	Released: January 6, 2021; Label: SME Japan; Formats: CD, CD + DVD	1	Oricon: 610,699	RIAJ: Double Platinum
City	Released: January 5, 2022; Label: SME Japan; Formats: CD, CD + Blu-ray, CD + DVD; Lead song "Rosy" is used as theme song for Japanese dub version of Spider-Man: No Way Home	1	Oricon: 560,466	RIAJ: Double Platinum
Koe	Released: January 4, 2023; Label: SME Japan; Formats: CD, CD + Blu-ray, CD + DVD	1	Oricon: 517,203	RIAJ: Double Platinum
The Vibes	Released: January 10, 2024; Label: SME Japan; Formats: CD, CD + Blu-ray, CD + DVD	1	Oricon: 496,565	RIAJ: Double Platinum
Gold	Released: January 15, 2025; Label: SME Japan; Formats: CD, CD + Blu-ray, CD + DVD	1	Oricon: 422,041	RIAJ: Double Platinum
I'MMA	Released: January 27, 2027; Label: SME Japan; Formats: CD, CD + Blu-ray, CD + DVD	TBA	TBA	TBA

=== Compilation albums ===
Title	Information	Peak chart positions	First week sales	Certifications
Title	Information	Oricon	First week sales	Certifications
Milesixtones: Best Tracks	Released: January 21, 2026; Label: SME Japan; Formats: CD, CD/DVD	1	Oricon: 577,124	RIAJ: Double Platinum

=== Video albums ===
Title	Video details	Peak chart positions			First week sales	Certifications
Title	Video details	Oricon DVD	Oricon BD	Overall	Oricon	Certifications
TrackOne: Impact	Released: October 14, 2020; Label: SME Japan; Formats: DVD, Blu-ray	1	1	1	DVD: 103,000; Blu-ray: 152,000; Total: 255,000	RIAJ: Platinum
On Est	Released: October 20, 2021; Label: SME Japan; Formats: DVD, Blu-ray	1	1	1	DVD: 94,000; Blu-ray: 162,000; Total: 256,000	RIAJ: Platinum
Feel da City	Released: September 28, 2022; Label: SME Japan; Formats: DVD, Blu-ray	1	1	1	DVD: 98,000; Blu-ray: 178,000; Total: 276,000	RIAJ: Platinum
Kansei no Hosoku in Dome	Released: November 1, 2023; Label: SME Japan; Formats: DVD, Blu-ray	1	1	1	DVD: 99,000; Blu-ray: 200,000; Total: 299,000	RIAJ: Platinum
VVS	Released: November 1, 2024; Label: SME Japan; Formats: DVD, Blu-ray	1	1	1	DVD: 77,000; Blu-ray: 164,000; Total: 241,000	RIAJ: Platinum
Young Old	Released: October 29, 2025; Label: SME Japan; Formats: DVD, Blu-ray	1	1	1	DVD: 65,951; Blu-ray: 143,599; Total: 209,550	RIAJ: Platinum
MILESixTONES	Released: November 4, 2026; Label: SME Japan; Formats: DVD, Blu-ray	1	1	1	DVD: 83,423; Blu-ray: 162,205; Total: 245,628	TBA

=== Singles ===
Title	Information	Peak chart positions	First week sales	Certifications
Title	Information	Oricon	First week sales	Certifications
"Imitation Rain/D.D."	Released: January 22, 2020; Double A side with Snow Man; Label: SME Japan / Avex	1	Oricon: 1,843,167	RIAJ: Million
"Navigator"	Released: July 22, 2020; OP for anime The Millionaire Detective Balance: Unlimited; Label: SME Japan	1	Oricon: 762,489	RIAJ: Triple Platinum
"New Era"	Released: November 11, 2020; OP for anime Yashahime: Princess Half-Demon; Label: SME Japan	1	Oricon: 532,706	RIAJ: Double Platinum
"Boku ga Boku Janai Mitai da" (僕が僕じゃないみたいだ)	Released: February 17, 2021; Theme song for movie Liar × Liar; Label: SME Japan	1	Oricon: 529,842	RIAJ: Double Platinum
"Mascara" (マスカラ)	Released: August 11, 2021; Label: SME Japan	1	Oricon: 557,324	RIAJ: Double Platinum
"Kyōmei" (共鳴)	Released: March 2, 2022; Second OP for anime Yashahime: Princess Half-Demon - The Second Act; Label: SME Japan	1	Oricon: 441,834	RIAJ: Platinum
"Watashi" (わたし)	Released: June 8, 2022; Insert song for TV drama Who Needs True Love?; Label: SME Japan	1	Oricon: 471,469	RIAJ: Double Platinum
"Good Luck!"/"Futari" (Good Luck!/ふたり)	Released: November 2, 2022; Label: SME Japan	1	Oricon: 391,796	RIAJ: Platinum
"Abarero"	Released: April 12, 2023; Label: SME Japan	1	Oricon: 429,179	RIAJ: 2× Platinum
"Kokkara" (こっから)	Released: June 14, 2023; Label: SME Japan	1	Oricon: 494,854	RIAJ: Double Platinum
"Creak"	Released: August 30, 2023; Label: SME Japan	1	Oricon: 475,397	RIAJ: Double Platinum
"Neiro" (音色)	Released: May 1, 2024; Label: SME Japan	1	Oricon: 523,078	RIAJ: Double Platinum
"Gong"/"Koko ni Kaette Kite" (GONG/ここに帰ってきて)	Released: July 10, 2024; Label: SME Japan	1	Oricon: 426,087	RIAJ: Double Platinum
"Barrier" (バリア)	Released: March 19, 2025; Label: SME Japan	1	Oricon: 363,211	RIAJ: Platinum
"Boyz"	Released: June 4, 2025; Label: SME Japan	1	Oricon: 356,596	RIAJ: Platinum
"Stargaze"	Released: September 10, 2025; Label: SME Japan	1	Oricon: 329,717	RIAJ: Platinum
"Ichibyo"/"Rebellion" (一秒/Rebellion)	Released: March 18, 2026; Label: SME Japan	1	Oricon: 392,190; Billboard Japan: 404,173	RIAJ: Platinum
"Dance Forever"/"My Only" (Dance Forever/マイオンリー)	Released: September 9, 2026; Label: SME Japan	1	Oricon: 436,000; Billboard Japan: 430,312	RIAJ: Platinum

== Filmography ==
=== Television ===
Year	Title	Network	Role	Notes	Ref.
2020-2024	Value no Shinjutsu	NHK Educational TV	Main host	Weekly program	
2024	SixTONES no Kyo Kara Producers!	Nippon Television	Main host	1 Episode Special program	
2024	Game of SixTONES	Nippon Television	Main host	2 Episodes Special program	
2025-present	Golden SixTONES	Nippon Television	Main host	Weekly program	
2026	6Sixtones	TBS	Main host	6 Episodes Special program	

=== Web series ===
Year	Title	Network	Role	Notes	Ref
2025-present	Warota!	Amazon Prime Video	Main host	14 Episodes	

=== Radio ===
Year(s)	Title	Network	Role	Notes	Ref.
2019-2021	Rajira! Saturday	NHK Radio 1	Host	Alternating weekly	
2020-present	Sixtones All Night Nippon Saturday Special	Nippon Broadcasting System	Main host	Weekly program	

== Concerts ==
Year	Title	Concert detail	Note
2019	CHANGE THE ERA −201ix−	3 cities 10 shows （Including 2 additional shows）	SixTones' First Solo Live Concert. The concert title is read as 'CHANGE THE ERA −2019-'. The 'ix' in the title represents both the silent letters 'ix' in the group name and the number 9, which is denoted as IX in Roman numerals. The concert logo was designed by Taiga Kyomoto. A total of 136,000 fans attended the concerts.
2019	Rough “xxxxxx”	14 cities 19 shows （Including 1 additional show）	The concert title is read as 'Rough Stones', which is a reference to the pronunciation of the group name, SixTones. 'Rough Stones' also means 'diamonds in the rough', which is one of the meaning behind the group name. In addition, 'rough' stands for 'roughly polished' and 'x' implies the unknown. As the Six 'x' symbolise the six members, the concert title reflects the roughly polished state of the members and group, as they seek to further polish their skills. The show on October 14 at Hokuto Culture Hall, Nagano, was postponed to November 28 due to Typhoon Hagibis.
2020	TrackONE -IMPACT-	3 cities 12 shows	Arena tour
2021	on eST	7 cities 30 shows + 5 live steam	Arena tour
2022	Feel da CITY	9 cities 37 shows （Including 1 additional show）	Following the March 16 earthquake in Fukushima Prefecture (maximum seismic intensity 6+), the four scheduled performances at Sekisui Heim Super Arena were canceled and later rescheduled for June.
2023	Kansei no Housoku（慣声の法則)	6 cities 26 shows	Including the arena tour, total reported attendance exceeded 520,000.
2023	Kansei no Housoku in DOME（慣声の法則 in DOME)	2 cities 5 shows	Including the arena tour, total reported attendance exceeded 520,000.
2024	VVS	4 cities 10 shows	Held at Kyocera Dome Osaka, Fukuoka PayPay Dome, Vantelin Dome Nagoya, and Tokyo Dome, with a combined reported attendance of 515,000.
2025	YOUNG OLD	5 cities 13 shows	The concerts were held across five dome venues nationwide, with a combined reported attendance of 615,000.
2026	MILESixTONES (pronounced: Milestones)	11 cities 50 shows	The tour comprised performances at 11 arenas and three stadiums across Japan. The arena leg visited Marine Messe Fukuoka Hall A, Sekisui Heim Super Arena, Aichi Sky Expo (Aichi International Exhibition Center), LaLa arena TOKYO-BAY, Osaka-jō Hall, Yokohama Arena, Shizuoka Ecopa Arena, Anabuki Arena Kagawa, Toki Messe Niigata Convention Center, Makomanai Sekisui Heim Ice Arena, and Okinawa Suntory Arena. The stadium leg included Ajinomoto Stadium, Yanmar Stadium Nagai, and Nissan Stadium. Running from January to November 2026, the tour was the group's largest to date, attracting a total audience of approximately 890,000.
2026	MILESixTONES (Stadium Tour)	3 cities 6 shows	
2027	1'MM AHEAD	TBA	Dome tour.

== Awards and nominations ==
Year	Awards	Category	Work(s)	Result	Ref.
2020	GQ MEN OF THE YEAR	Pop Icon of the Year		Won	
2020	35th Japan Gold Disc Awards	New Artist of the Year		Won	
2020	35th Japan Gold Disc Awards	Single of the Year	"Imitation Rain/DD"	Won	
2021	36th Japan Gold Disc Awards	Best 5 Albums	1ST	Won	
2022	37th Japan Gold Disc Awards	Best 5 Albums	CITY	Won	
2023	116th Television Drama Academy Awards	Best Theme song	"Kokkara"	Won	
2024	38th Japan Gold Disc Awards	Best 5 Albums	Koe	Won	
2024	MTV VMAJ	Group of the Year		Won	
2025	39th Japan Gold Disc Awards	Music Video of the Year	VVS	Won	
2026	40th Japan Gold Disc Awards	Best 3 Music Videos	YOUNG OLD	Won	
2026	MTV VMAJ 2026	Best Group Video -Japan-	Dance Forever	Won	
2026	MTV VMAJ 2026	Best Pop Video	Ichibyo	Won	
2026	MTV VMAJ 2026	Best Cinematography	My Only	Won	
2026	MTV VMAJ 2026	Group of the Year		Won	
