= Jimmy Onishi =

Japanese painter and comedian

- ジミー大西
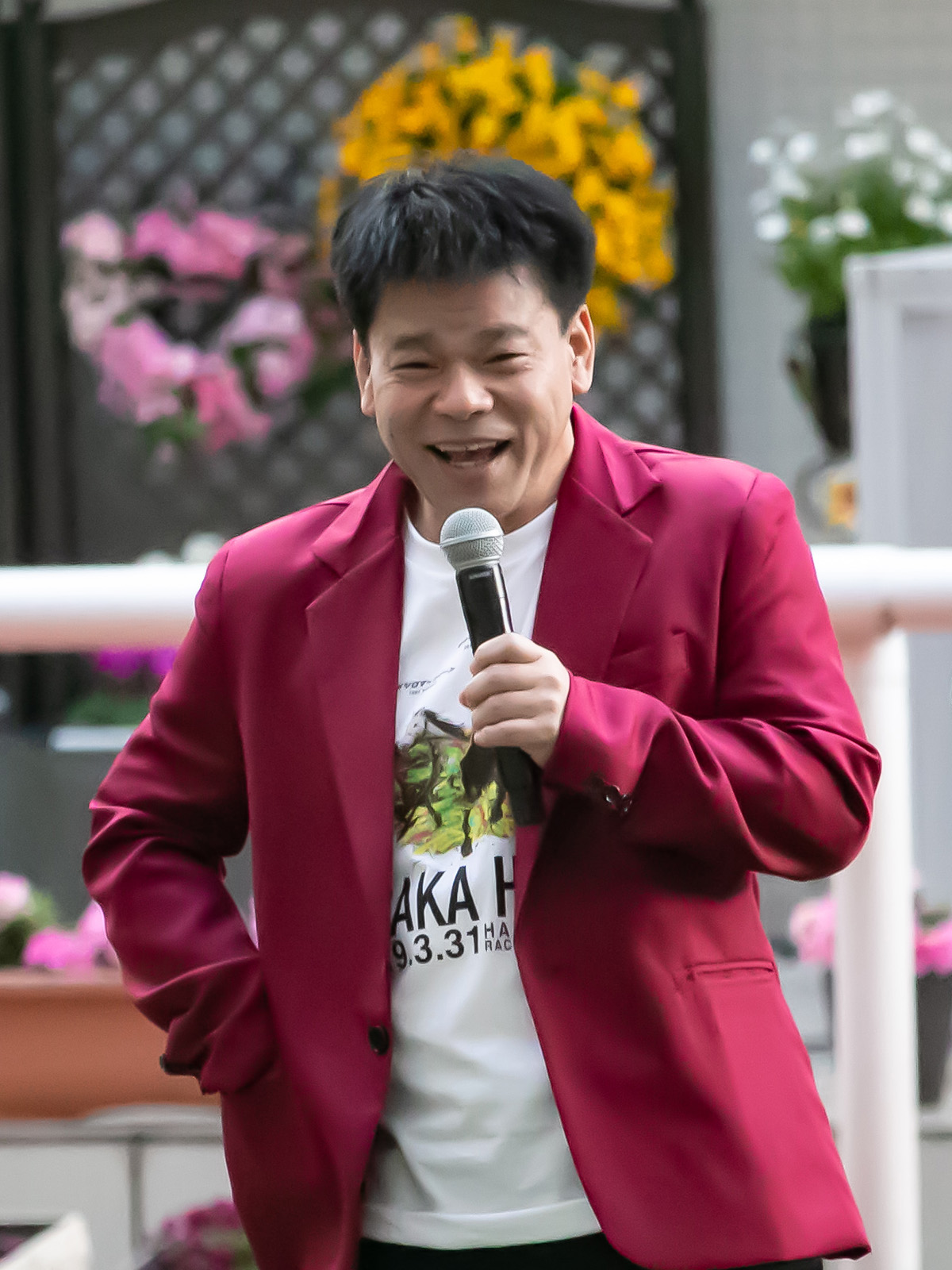
- Born: 大西 秀明 (Ōnishi Hideaki); January 1, 1964 (age 62); Yao, Osaka, Japan
- Other names: Jimmy-chan (ジミーちゃん, Jimī-chan)
- Education: Yao Municipal Annaka Elementary School; Yao Tatsunaru Method Junior High School; Daisho Large Sakai High School
- Occupations: Painter, comedian
- Years active: 1982–present
- Agent: Yoshimoto Creative Agency
- Known for: Higashino Okamura no Tabizaru; Knight Scoop; Gaki no Tsukai

Jimmy Onishi (ジミー大西, Jimī Ōnishi; born 1 January 1964) is a Japanese painter and comedian. His real name is Hideaki Onishi (大西 秀明, Ōnishi Hideaki), in which his given name is a combination of Hide (秀) from daimyo Toyotomi Hideyoshi and Aki (明) means "bright" which relates to the New Year celebrations as he was born on New Year's Day.

Onishi is represented with Yoshimoto Creative Agency.

== Filmography ==
=== TV series ===
Year	Title	Network	Notes
1985	Waiwai Saturday	ABC	
	Kindon! Hakkeyōi Waratta!	Fuji TV	
	Ore-tachi Hyōkinzoku	Fuji TV	
	Hyōkin Yobikō	Fuji TV	
1990	Waratte Iitomo!	Fuji TV	Friday appearances
	Quiz Sekai wa Show by Shobai	NTV	
	Akashiya TV	MBS	
	Downtown no Gaki no Tsukai ya Arahende!!	NTV	Occasional appearances
	Quiz! Atatte 25%	TBS	
	Video Anata ga Shuyaku	TV Asahi	Occasional appearances
	Knight Scoop	ABC	
	Susume! Cliff Hanger Bōken-tai	CBC TV	
	Inochi no Hibiki	TBS	
2011	Higashino Okamura no Tabizaru	NTV	

=== TV dramas ===
Year	Title	Role	Network
1989	Sanma Akashiya Satsujin Jiken		Fuji TV
1991	Yonimo Kimyona Monogatari	Train passenger	Fuji TV
2018	Jimmy: The True Story of a True Idiot	Himself	Netflix

=== Films ===
Year	Title	Role
1992	Kennel Tokorozawa	Rin-Tin-Tin
1996	Nanohana Haitatsu-bin	Saburo Morikawa
2018	Nomitori Samurai	

=== Others ===
Year	Title	Network
2001	Kemuri Haruka ni: Sekai SL Kikō Sweet Sugar Train –Cuba–	NHK

== Advertisements ==
Year	Title	Notes
	Hitachi "Akarui Wa"	Narration
1990	Kagome "Two Shot"	
1996	One Cup Ōzeki	Co-starring with Masakazu Tamura
2003	Japan Racing Association	Co-starring with Sanma Akashiya
2012	Jumbo Takarakuji	Co-starring with Takuya Kimura

== Bibliography ==
=== Art books ===
Year	Title
2008	Masshiro: Jimmy Onishi Gashū

=== Diaries ===
Year	Title
1992	Jimmy-chan no Kimochi E~nikki

=== Photo diaries ===
Year	Title
1997	Tenneniro Nikki

=== Photo books ===
Year	Title
1995	Homeland
2001	Toten-kun no Orchestra
2002	Chīsana Hanabi no Himitsu

== Calendars ==
Year	Title
2001	Jimmy Onishi Sakuhin-shū: Calendar 2002
2002	Jimmy Onishi Sakuhin-shū: Calendar 2003
2003	Jimmy Onishi Sakuhin-shū: 2004-nendo Calendar
2004	Jimmy Onishi Sakuhin-shū: 2005-nendo Calendar

== Documents ==
Year	Title
2002	htwi No. 9 Artist, Jimmy Onishi no Kiseki: Art Magazine
