= Shiritsu Bakaleya Koukou =

2012 Japanese television series

- poster
- Written by: Yasushi Akimoto
- Starring: Shintaro Morimoto; Haruka Shimazaki; Yuya Takaki
- Country of origin: Japan
- Original language: Japanese
- No. of seasons: 1
- No. of episodes: 12

Production
- Camera setup: Multi-camera
- Running time: 30 minutes

Original release
- Network: NTV
- Release: April 14 – June 30, 2012

Shiritsu Bakalea Koukou (私立バカレア高校, Shiritsu Bakarea Kōkō; lit. Bakalea Private High School) is a 2012 Japanese television drama. Written by AKB48 producer Yasushi Akimoto, this television series featured Johnny's Hey! Say! JUMP member Yuya Takaki, as well as members of then Johnny's Jr. now known as SixTones and AKB48's Team 4.

== Plot ==
Bakada High School is a well-known Yankī (delinquent) school where students only know how to fight. On the other hand, Cattleya High School is an all-girls school meant for the rich and refined students. One day, when Bakada merged into Cattleya to form Cattleya No. 2 High School, students from Bakada and Cattleya could not accept each other as they come from completely different backgrounds. Over time, the two groups slowly warm up.

== Cast ==
=== Bakada High School ===
- Shintaro Morimoto as Tatsuya Sakuragi
- Hokuto Matsumura as Tetsuya Asada
- Yuya Takaki as Shohei Tatsunami
- Taiga Kyomoto as Maya Terakawa
- Juri Tanaka as Soichi Noguchi
- Jesse as Yuki Satonaka
- Yugo Kochi as Makoto Jimbo

=== Cattleya No.1 High School ===
- Haruka Shimazaki as Fumie Shingyoji
- Mina Ōba as Saya Kokyu
- Kaoru Mitsumune as Sayuri Tokimune
- Mariya Nagao as Mana Honjo
- Marina Kobayashi as Reika Zaizen
- Haruka Shimada as An Miyata
- Mariko Nakamura as Kaori Shinohara
- Toshiya Miyata as Junichi Koba
- Takaya Kamikawa as Haruki Minamoto

=== Others ===
- Rie Kitahara as Momoko
- Ryohei Abe as Hiroi Azuma
- Dai Watanabe as Ryo Saionji
- Hiroki Uchi as Ren Sakuragi
- Yokoyama Yui as Ris

== Episodes ==
	Episode title	Romanized title	Translation of title	Broadcast date	Ratings
Ep. 1	プロローグ	Purorōgu	Prologue	April 14, 2012	3.3%
Ep. 2	合併	Gappei	Merger	April 21, 2012	3.8%
Ep. 3	総選挙	Sōsenkyo	Election	April 28, 2012	2.1%
Ep. 4	カトレアのルール	Katorea no Rūru	Rules of Cattleya	May 5, 2012	3.9%
Ep. 5	今いる場所	Ima iru Basho	Where You are Today	May 12, 2012	3.0%
Ep. 6	バッティングセンター	Battingu Sentā	Batting Centre	May 19, 2012	3.0%
Ep. 7	初恋	Hatsukoi	First Love	May 26, 2012	2.3%
Ep. 8	ファミレス	Famiresu	Family Restaurant	June 2, 2012	3.0%
Ep. 9	裏切り	Uragiri	Betrayal	June 9, 2012	2.8%
Ep. 10	FGSP			June 16, 2012	2.3%
Ep. 11	廃校	Haikō	Closing Down the School	June 23, 2012	2.3%
Ep. 12	バカレア高校	Bakarea Kōkō	Bakaleya High School	June 30, 2012	2.3%
Ratings for Kanto region

== Production ==
Shiritsu Bakaleya Koukou was first announced by AKB48 producer Yasushi Akimoto on 1 March 2012. This drama features members from the female idol group AKB48 and male idol group Johnny's Jr., with this being the first time where members of AKB48 and Johnny's Jr. collaborate in a television drama. Most of the cast members featured in this show had no prior experience in acting.

It was subsequently revealed that Shiritsu Bakaleya Koukou received a film sequel. Members of the original cast will reprise their roles in the sequel. This film sequel was released in the Japanese box office in October 2012.
