= Koji Mukai =

Japanese singer, television personality, and actor (born 1994)

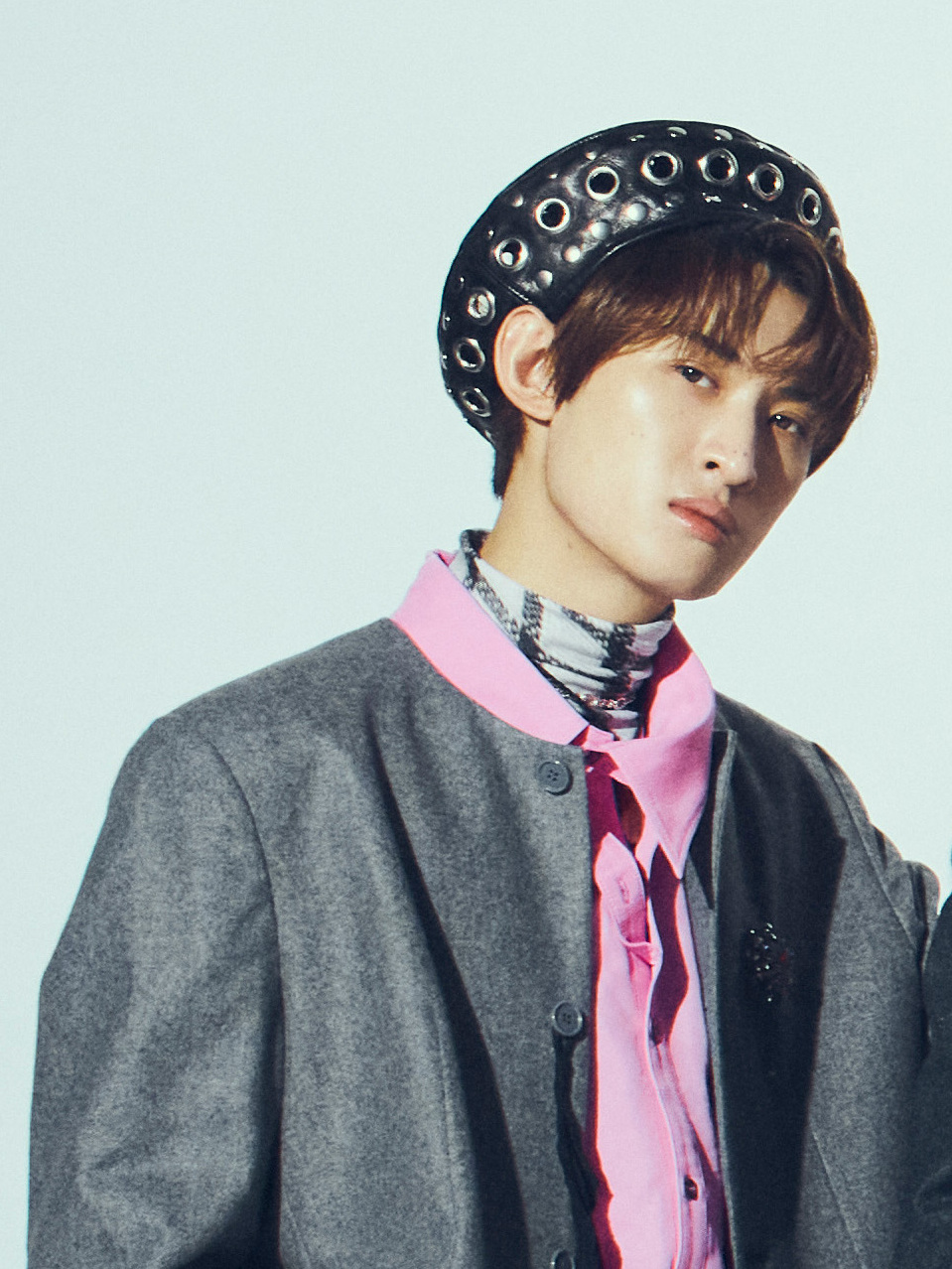
- Mukai in January 2023
- Born: June 21, 1994 (age 32); Thailand
- Citizenship: Japanese
- Occupations: Singer; tarento; actor
- Years active: 2006–present
- Hometown: Nara Prefecture, Japan
- Musical career
- Genre: J-pop
- Instrument: Vocals
- Years active: 2019–present
- Labels: Johnny's Office (2006–2023); SMILE-UP (2023–present)
- Member of: Snow Man

Japanese name
- Kanji: 向井 康二
- Hiragana: むかい こうじ
- Romanization: Mukai Kōji

Koji Mukai (向井 康二(むかい こうじ), Mukai Kōji; born June 21, 1994) is a Japanese singer, tarento, and actor. He is a member of the Japanese boy band Snow Man.

== Biography ==
Koji Mukai was born on June 21, 1994, in Thailand, to a Thai mother and Japanese father. Shortly after his birth, his family moved to Nara Prefecture, Japan. He has one older brother who is two years older. Mukai has shared that he spent part of his childhood in Thailand, as his family often visited his maternal grandparents there for a few months every year, and because of this, he learned the Thai language and can speak it at a conversational level.

== Filmography ==
=== Film ===
Year	Title	Role	Notes	Ref.
2012	Dormitory Festival!: The Last Seven Wonders	Mutsuo Konishi		
2013	Kansai Johnny's Jr.'s Kyoto Uzumasa March!	Katsuya Toda		
2014	Ninja Has Arrived! Battle for the Future	Kisuke		
2016	Kansai Johnny's Jr. Aim for ♪ Dream Stage!	Shokichi Koyanagi		
2017	Kansai Johnny's Jr.'s Comedy Star Is Born!	Shigenobu Kanno		
2019	Boys	Tatsuya		
2022	Osomatsu-san	Osomatsu	Lead role	
2025	Love Song	Kai	Lead role; Thai-Japanese film	

=== Television drama ===
Year	Title	Role	Notes	Ref.
2010	J Gakuen School Stairs	Mukai and Kosuke	Episodes 1 and 10	
2016	Shinbei with Children 2	Teppei	Episode 6	
2019	The Great White Tower	Yoichi Sasaki		
2022–25	Special Investigation 9	Shohei Mitsuya	4 seasons	
2024	Living-Room Matsunaga-san	Kentaro Suzuki		
2024	Mountain Doctor	Shingo Komatsu		
2025	Dating Game	Sakurai Junji	Lead role; Thai-Japanese drama	
2025	Fake Mummy	Ryuma Kuroki		
2026	Iroha's Love Runs Across Eras	Ikuru Ichinose		

== Bibliography ==
- Asahi Shimbun Publishing
  - Asahi Camera Incandescent Lessons on Photography with Masters (April 2020 issue - July 2020 issue)
  - Aera Koji Mukai learns incandescent camera lessons (July 27, 2020 enlarged issue)
- Hinode Publishing "CINEMA SQUARE" "Koji's movie" (issue released on August 3, 2020 [Vol.122])
