= Jesse (Japanese singer) =

Jesse ジェシー
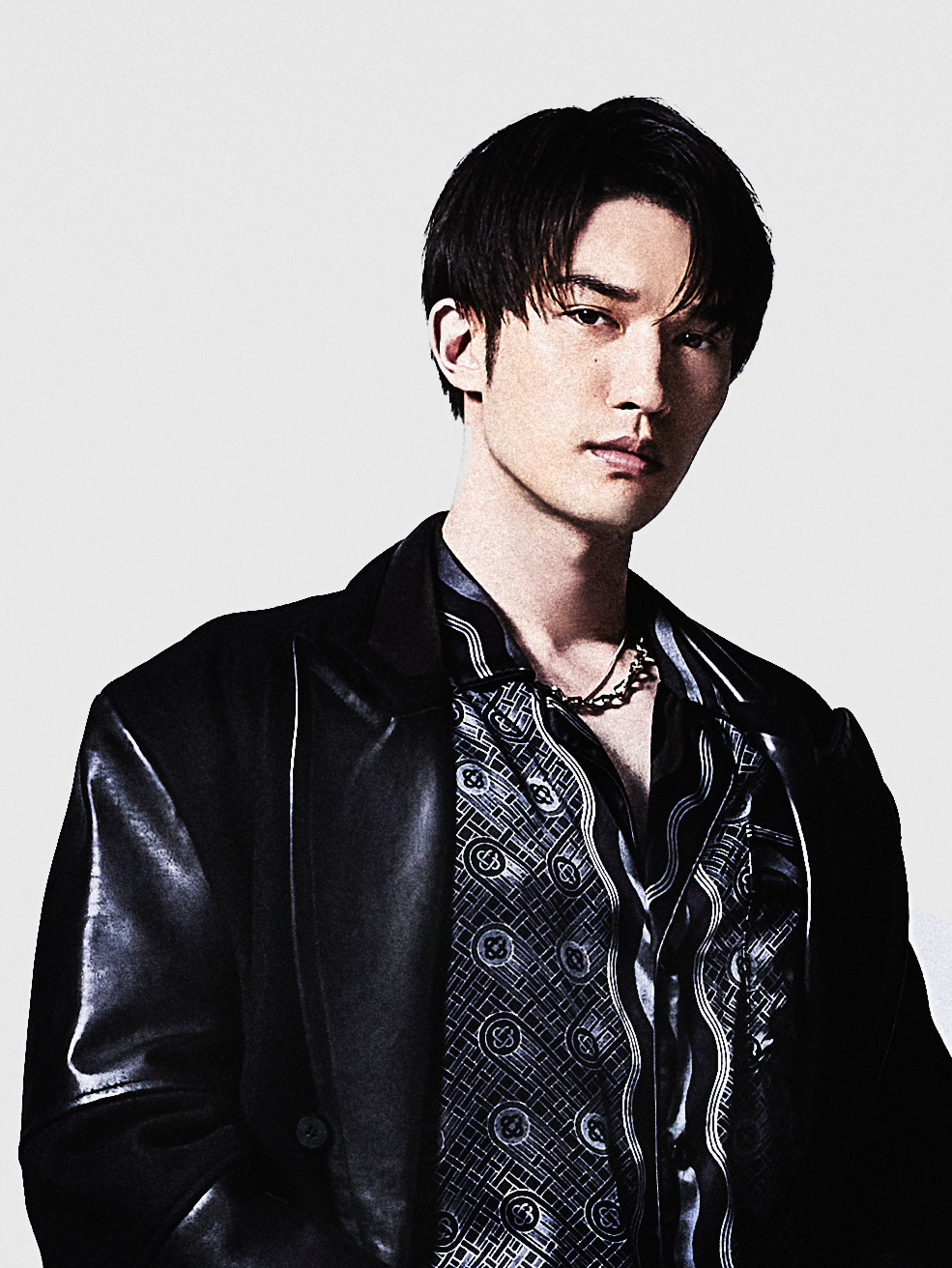

Background information
- Also known as: Jesse Lewis
- Born: Jesse Masaya Lewis (ルイス昌也ジェシー); June 11, 1996 (age 30)
- Origin: Tokyo, Japan
- Genres: J-pop
- Occupations: Singer; actor
- Years active: 2006–present
- Labels: Sony Music Entertainment Japan: Starto Entertainment; Johnny & Associates
- Member of: SixTones
- Website: https://zdn-j.com

Jesse Masaya Lewis (ルイス昌也ジェシー, Ruisu Masaya Jeshī; born June 11, 1996), known professionally as Jesse (ジェシー, Jeshī), is a Japanese singer, actor, and model. He is a member of group SixTONES.

== Early life ==
Jesse Masaya Lewis, son of a Japanese mother and American father, was born in Tokyo, Japan in 1996. He has a younger sister. Jesse is fluent in Japanese and English.

== Career ==
Jesse chose to use only his first name as his stage name while he was a part of the junior talent of Johnny & Associates, agency to which he belonged since entering in September 2006.

In 2012, Jesse and other members of then-called Johnny's Juniors, acted in the drama Shiritsu Bakaleya Koukou, which was Jesse's debut as an actor. The six-member group was given the official name SixTONES when they were performing in "Johnny's Ginza 2015". The group debuted in 2020. Following the annual tradition of choosing the group's leader by Rock paper scissors started in Arashi's show Arashi ni Shiyagare in 2020, as suggested by Arashi's leader Satoshi Ohno, Jesse was chosen as SixTONES' leader for 2024.

Besides singing (as part of SixTONES) and acting in TV dramas, Jesse has also acted in theater plays, which have included musicals such as Beetlejuice.

In 2023, after the Johnny Kitagawa sexual abuse scandal, activities of artists of Johnny & Associates, including SixTONES, were taken over by a new entity called Starto Entertainment, which officially started in April 2024.

On 19 July 2024, Jesse announced on his Instagram that he had established a private company called ZDN Co,.Ltd. for his individual activities. The company name was taken from one of his catchphrase "Zudon!" (ズドン！, lit. "bang!"). His activities as part of the group would continue under Starto.

Jesse was appointed as brand ambassador for Under Armour Japan, as announced on March 24, 2025.

== Filmography ==
=== Television ===
Year	Title	Role	Notes	Ref.
2012	Shiritsu Bakaleya Koukou	Yuki Satonaka		
2012	Sprout	Hayato Katagiri	credited as Lewis Jesse	
2020	K2: Dodgy Badge Brothers	Ichiro Morohoshi		
2024	Captured New Airport	Rat/Taiga Niimi		

=== Film ===
Year	Title	Role	Notes	Ref.
2019	Ninja Drones?	Joe (N° 112)		
2023	Tokyo MER: Mobile Emergency Room	Tomohiro Shiomi		
2023	Revolver Lily	Kiyochika Josef Tsuyama		
2025	A Girl & Her Guard Dog	Keiya Utō	Lead role	
2025	Tokyo MER: Mobile Emergency Room – Nankai Mission	Tomohiro Shiomi		
2026	Tokyo MER: Mobile Emergency Room – Capital Crisis	Tomohiro Shiomi		

=== Animation and voice dubbing ===
Year	Title	Role	Notes	Ref.
2026	Shin Gekijōban Keroro Gunsō: Fukkatsu Shite Sokkō Chikyū Metsubō no Kiki de Arimasu!	Aruru, Deruru	Lead roles	
