= Hokuto Matsumura =

Japanese entertainer (born 1995)

- 松村北斗
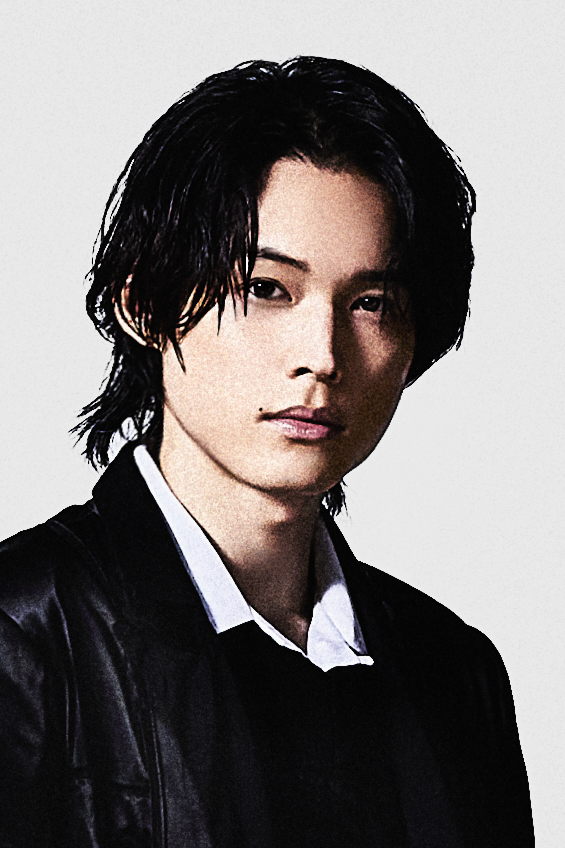
- Born: June 18, 1995 (age 31); Shimada, Japan
- Education: Horikoshi High School; Asia University (Faculty of Business Administration)
- Occupations: Singer; Actor
- Years active: 2009–present
- Agent: Starto Entertainment
- Notable work: Minoru Kijima in Come Come Everybody; Souta Munakata in Suzume
- Musical career
- Genre: J-Pop
- Label: Sony Music Entertainment Japan
- Member of: SixTONES
- Formerly of: B.I.Shadow
- Website: sixtones.jp

Hokuto Matsumura (松村 北斗, Matsumura Hokuto; born June 18, 1995) is a Japanese actor and singer. He is a member of the boy group SixTONES under STARTO Entertainment. Matsumura gained major recognition for his voice-acting role as Souta Munakata in Suzume (2022), and his performance in All the Long Nights earned him the Best Actor award at the 98th Kinema Junpo Best Ten Awards in 2025.

== Early life ==
Matsumura Hokuto was born on June 18, 1995, in Shimada, Shizuoka Prefecture, Japan. He began practicing karate in elementary school and later competed at the prefectural and national levels, placing second in the Shizuoka Prefecture tournament during his first year of junior high school. After completing junior high, he moved to Tokyo with his family to pursue his education and enrolled in the advanced course at Suginami Gakuin High School. Due to the increasing demands of his entertainment activities, he later transferred to Horikoshi High School’s Trainee Course, known for accommodating young performers. In April 2015, Matsumura entered the Faculty of Business Administration at Asia University in Tokyo and graduated in March 2019.

He developed an interest in the entertainment industry during elementary school after watching television dramas, particularly Tomohisa Yamashita’s performance in the drama Kurosagi. Inspired by this, he auditioned for and joined Johnny & Associates as a trainee on February 15, 2009.

== Career ==
Matsumura joined the talent agency Johnny & Associates in 2009, prior to his CD debut as a member of the temporary units Yuma Nakayama w/B.I.Shadow and NYC boys. He made his acting debut in the 2012 drama series Shiritsu Bakaleya Koukou, which was later followed by a film continuation. Following the film’s success, he was cast in his first leading television role in the TBS primetime drama Miss Double Faced Teacher (2012).

In 2013, Matsumura ranked first in Myojo magazine’s annual poll “Jr.’s Most Wanted as a Lover”. The following year, he appeared as one of the main members in the TV Asahi variety show Gamushara, which aired until March 2016. During the Johnny’s Ginza concert held at Tokyo’s Theatre Crea in May 2015, Matsumura was announced as a member of the newly formed Johnny’s Jr. group SixTONES, alongside his Shiritsu Bakaleya Koukou co-stars. The same year, he co-starred with bandmates Jesse and Juri Tanaka in the film Vanilla Boy: Tomorrow Is Another Day, which premiered nationwide in September 2016

As a member of SixTONES, Matsumura was appeared annually in the musical Shounentachi since 2015, performing alongside the group Snow Man. He made his voice acting debut as Souta Munakata in Makoto Shinkai’s animated feature Suzume (2022).

== Filmography ==
=== Television ===
Year	Title	Role	Notes	Ref.
2012	Shiritsu Bakaleya Koukou	Tetsuya Asada		
2012	Miss Double Faced Teacher	Toshio Toda		
2012	Piece	Takashi Yanai		
2013	Take Five: Should we Steal for Love?	Kazuma Doujou		
2013	Pin to Kona	Shohei Sawayama		
2014	Shark	Ayumu Ryuzaki		
2018	Yo nimo Kimyo na Monogatari: 2018 Fall Special	Daichi	Episode: Mathematic na Yuugure	
2019	Perfect World	Haruto Watanabe		
2020	The Secrets	Tsubasa Date		
2020	Ichiokuen no Sayonara	Teppei Kano		
2021	Red Eyes	Kaname Komaki		
2021–22	Come Come Everybody	Minoru Kijima	Asadora	
2022	Who Needs True Love?	Shuma Nagamine		
2023	Knockin' on Locked Door	Tori Gotenba	Lead role	
2024	Ms. Saionji Doesn't Do Housework	Toshinao Kusumi		
2024	Rojo no Ruka	Natsuhiko Shiomi		
2025	Ensemble	Yuu Matohara		
2026	Sins of Kujo	Shinji Karasuma		
2026	25 Years of You	Sōta Yukimura	Lead role	

=== Film ===
Year	Title	Role	Notes	Ref.
2012	Bakaleya High School	Tetsuya Asada		
2016	Vanilla Boy: Tomorrow Is Another Day	Shūta Hayashi	Lead role	
2018	Kids on the Slope	Seiji Matsuoka		
2019	Ninja Drones?	Daiken (N° 391)		
2021	Liar × Liar	Tōru Takatsuki	Lead role	
2021	What Did You Eat Yesterday?	Gō Tabuchi		
2022	xxxHolic	Shizuka Dōmeki		
2022	Suzume	Sōta Munakata (voice)		
2023	Kyrie	Natsuhiko Shiomi		
2024	All the Long Nights	Takatoshi Yamazoe	Lead role	
2024	Dear Family	Susumu Tomioka		
2025	1st Kiss	Kakeru Suzuri		
2025	5 Centimeters per Second	Takaki Tōno	Lead role	
2026	Guilt	Kazuma Kuraki	Lead role	
2026	You, Like a Star	Naoto Kuzumi		
2027	Sins of Kujo: The Movie	Shinji Karasuma		
2027	Mada Minu Kimi e	Yosuke	Lead role	

== Awards and nominations ==
Year	Award	Category	Work(s)	Result	Ref.
2021	46th Hochi Film Awards	Best New Artist	Liar × Liar	Nominated	
2022	76th Mainichi Film Awards	Best New Actor	Liar × Liar	Nominated	
2022	The 111th Television Drama Academy Awards	Best Supporting Actor	Come Come Everybody	Won	
2023	46th Japan Academy Film Prize	Newcomer of the Year	xxxHolic	Won	
2024	51st Annie Awards	Best Voice Acting – Feature	Suzume	Nominated	
2024	The 121st Television Drama Academy Awards	Best Supporting Actor	Ms. Saionji Doesn't Do Housework	Won	
2024	37th Nikkan Sports Film Awards	Fan's Choice Best Acting Award	All the Long Nights	Won	
2024	16th Tama Film Awards	Best New Actor	All the Long Nights	Won	
2024	3rd Women's Journalist Film Award	Best Actor	All the Long Nights	Won	
2025	98th Kinema Junpo Awards	Best Actor	All the Long Nights	Won	
2026	50th Elan d'or Awards	Elan d'or Award	1st Kiss, 5 Centimeters per Second, Ensemble and Lovely Ensemble	Won	
2026	49th Japan Academy Film Prize	Best Actor	5 Centimeters per Second	Nominated	
2026	49th Japan Academy Film Prize	Best Supporting Actor	1st Kiss	Nominated	
2026	51st Hochi Film Awards	Best Actor	Guilt	Pending	
2026	51st Hochi Film Awards	Best Supporting Actor	You, Like a Star	Pending	
