= Shintaro Morimoto =

Japanese singer and actor (born 1997)

Shintaro Morimoto 森本慎太郎
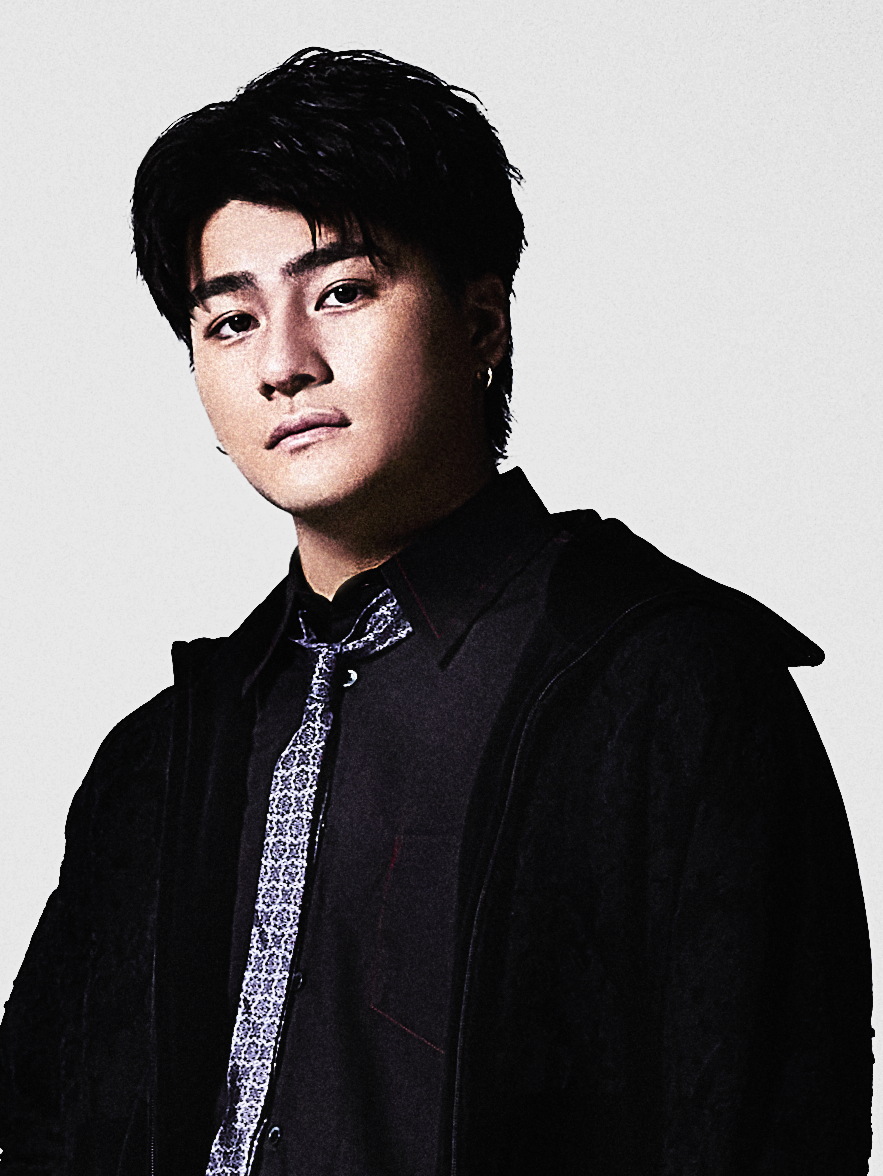
- Shintaro Morimoto in 2022

Background information
- Born: July 15, 1997 (age 28); Yokohama, Kanagawa Prefecture, Japan
- Origin: Kanagawa, Japan
- Genres: J-pop
- Occupations: Singer, actor
- Years active: 2006–present
- Labels: Sony Music Entertainment Japan: Starto Entertainment; Johnny & Associates
- Member of: SixTONES
- Formerly of: Johnny's Jr.
- Website: https://www.sixtones.jp/

Shintaro Morimoto (森本慎太郎, Morimoto Shintaro; born July 15, 1997), is a Japanese singer and actor. He is currently a member of SixTONES.

== Career ==
Morimoto was scouted by Johnny Kitagawa to join the talent agency Smile-Up (formerly known as Johnny & Associates) in 2006.

He entered the Johnny's Jr. group, Tap Kids, in 2007 and made his first stage appearance in "Takizawa Enbujo 2007". He also participated in "DREAM BOYS" and starred in "God of Examination" and "Love and Devil ~ Vampire ☆ Boy" in 2007.

In 2009, Morimoto passed the audition to starred as the lead role, Harada Sota, in the movie "Snow Prince – Forbidden Love Melody". On October 15, 2009, the movie premiered in Antwerp, Belgium and he was appointed as the "Friendship Ambassador of Flanders Tourism Board, Belgium" along with Yuma Nakayama. On November 1, 2009, Morimoto was appointed as the leader of a newly formed temporary Johnny's Jr. unit, Snow Prince, consisting of 11 members. The group later made a CD debut titled "Snow Prince" on December 2, 2009.

In 2012, he starred as the lead role, Tatsuya Sakuragi, in NTV's Shiritsu Bakaleya Koukou. The drama was later extended to a movie sequel, in which he retained the same lead role as Tatsuya Sakuragi. He also appeared in "GTO: Remake Season 1 " in the same year, which was a remake of the live adaption drama series in 1998. In the following year, Morimoto appeared in another school drama, "Kasuka na Kanojo".

In May 2015, Morimoto became part of the Johnny Jr. unit, SixTones, which consist of most of Bakaleya main cast. The group is scheduled to make their CD debut on January 22, 2020. Alongside with SixTONES, Morimoto co-starred in a few stage shows, such as the long historic Shounentachi, for every year since 2015–2019 with another Johnny's Jr. group Snow Man.

In 2019, Morimoto starred in prime time drama series "Kansatsui Asagao" as Takuma Morimoto.

== Personal life ==
Morimoto's older brother is Ryutaro Morimoto, a former member of Hey! Say! JUMP.

== Filmography ==
=== Television ===
Year	Title	Role	Notes	Ref.
2008	Battery	Seiha Harada		
2009	Koishite Akuma	Shota Miura		
2010	Hidarime Tantei Eye	Shimada	Episode 3	
2012	Shiritsu Bakaleya Koukou	Sakuragi Tatsuya	Lead role	
2012	GTO: Remake Season 1	Kunio Murai		
2012	Kasuka na Kanojo	Ryosuke Nezu		
2018	Bukatsu, Suki Janakya Dame Desu Ka?	Isshiki		
2019	Kansatsui Asagao	Takuma Morimoto		
2023	Passion for Punchlines	Ryota Yamasato	Lead role	

=== Film ===
Year	Title	Role	Notes	Ref.
2009	Snow Prince	Sota Harada	Lead role	
2012	Gekijōban Shiritsu Bakaleya Kōkō	z Sakuragi Tatsuya	Lead role	
2014	Ninjani Sanjo! Mirai e no Tatakai	Hayate		
2019	Ninja Drones?	Hiroto		
2021	Baragaki: Unbroken Samurai	Ichimura Tetsunosuke		
2023	G-Men	Masahiro Umeda		
2024	Faceless	Kazuya Nonomura		

=== Dubbing ===
- F1 - Joshua "Noah" Pearce (Damson Idris)

== Awards and nominations ==
Year	Award	Category	Work(s)	Result	Ref.
2025	48th Japan Academy Film Prize	Newcomer of the Year	Faceless	Won	
