= Yuma Nakayama =

Japanese actor and singer (born 1994)

Yuma Nakayama 中山 優馬
- Born: January 13, 1994 (age 32)
- Origin: Osaka, Japan
- Genres: J-pop
- Occupations: Actor; singer
- Instrument: Vocals
- Years active: 2006–present
- Label: Johnny's Entertainment

Yuma Nakayama (中山 優馬, Nakayama Yūma; born January 13, 1994) is a Japanese actor and singer. He was born in Osaka, Japan.

He was a past member of many Johnny's Jr. groups such as Top Kids and 7 West. He released his debut CD single in 2009 as part of Yuma Nakayama w/B.I.Shadow and NYC Boys. He performs both as a solo artist and as part of Johnny's Entertainment special unit, NYC. He is the younger brother of former NMB48 member Nana Yamada.

== Career ==
=== 2008–2009: Acting debut, Yuma Nakayama w/B.I. Shadow and NYC Boys ===
In April 2008, Nakayama was cast to make a starring role for the drama Battery.

In June 2009, it was announced that Nakayama would form a group together with four other Johnny's Jr. called B.I. Shadow forming the name Yuma Nakayama w/B.I.Shadow. They are the second Johnny's group after Tackey & Tsubasa to have a name directly in the group name, and are also the second group after News to have both Johnny's Jr. and Kansai Jr. members together in one group. On the same month of the year, it was also revealed that Nakayama will be joined by two Hey! Say! JUMP member, Ryosuke Yamada and Yuri Chinen to form a special group called NYC Boys. The NYC was an abbreviation of each member initial and the boys referred to the B.I. Shadow.

In July 2009, he starred in the drama Koishite Akuma. Yuma Nakayama w/B.I.Shadow provided the theme song of the drama titled Akuma na Koi which went on to sell 100,000 plus copies to date making them the youngest group to top the Oricon chart beating the previous record of Hey! Say! 7 with Hey! Say!. Akuma no Koi was released as split single with NYC Boys debut single, Akuma na Koi.

In November 2009, the media announced that they would be guest appearing on Japan's highest rated annual music television show, Kōhaku Uta Gassen, on December 31, 2009. Other guest appearances that year included FNS Kayosai on December 2, 2009.

=== 2010–2012: NYC ===
On January 1, 2010, media announced that the group would not be a temporary one anymore and that Ryosuke Yamada and Chinen Yuri would be working as members of both Hey! Say! JUMP and NYC Boys in the future.

NYC without the boys (B.I.Shadow) release a new single, titled "Yūki 100%", on April 7, 2010. It was the opening theme song for an anime titled Nintama Rantarō. The coupling song "Yume no Tane" was the ending theme. The song "Yūki 100%" topped Japan Billboards' Weekly Hot 100 and Oricon's Weekly Chart.

On October 20, 2010, NYC released a single titled "Yoku Asobi Yoku Manabe". The single reached number one on the Oricon weekly charts in its first week of sales.

On March 9, 2011, the group released a new single with the name of "Yume Tamago", which peaked first on the Oricon Daily Singles chart with 31,393 sales and ended up in fourth position on the Oricon Monthly singles chart with 154,140 sales, being certified gold by the RIAJ.

In February 2012, NYC released their fourth single which was titled "Wonderful Cupid" and contained Nakayama's solo song Glass no Mahou. In May 2012, NYC released their fifth single, titled "Haina!".

=== 2012: Solo career ===
On October 31, 2012, Yuma released his first solo single entitled Missing Piece. The single includes "Missing Piece" as the opening song and "Mizu no Kaeru Basho" as the insert song for his TV drama Piece; the latter song is his rendition of "Kuroi Mizu" (written and originally performed by singer-songwriter Mikio Sakai).

=== 2013 ===
Yuma played a role as a Kabuki actor from a non-Kabuki inclined family in the drama Pin to Kona.

It was announced that Yuma would have New Song "Ai made ga naifu" as the ending theme of Fuji TV's daytime drama "Tengoku no Koi" which started on October 28 and was shown everyday from 13:00–14:00 (JST) starred by Johnnys Juniors Takada Sho and Uchi Hiroki. Nakayama's second solo single, "High Five" was released on April 2, 2014. The single includes "High Five" as theme song for NTV's "Sukkiri!!" and coupling song "Ai made ga Knife" for FUJI TV's drama "Tengoku no Koi"'s ending theme song. Limited Edition B includes DVD from Nakayama Yuma's event for his first single Missing Piece in Osaka-ORIX theater. The single had an event called "High Five with nakayama Yuma" which held in various Aeon malls throughout Japan. The event sold a special CD only with a 2page jacket, a CD which includes the song High Five.

Nakayama was cast as Jotaro Matsui in a Fuji TV adaptation of the manga Smoking Gun together with his senior Shingo Katori.

Nakayama was able to release his third solo single, "Get Up!" that was released on September 10, 2014. It was the hardest PV shoot for him as he danced all day (while doing works in between), to film 7 different angles. Just like the single High Five, this single also has events. The first event is called Special Summer Event ～Get up & Come meet YUMA and the other one was to be held in 2015 at Tokyo and Osaka.

Nakayama's first album "Chapter 1" was released on November 26, 2014.

== Discography ==
For Nakayama Yuma's works with NYC, see NYC
For Nakayama Yuma's works with Nakayama Yuma w/B.I.Shadow, see Yuma Nakayama w/B.I.Shadow

=== Singles ===
Release date	Title	Rank	Sales	Certification
October 31, 2012	"Missing Piece"	2	65,420	RIAJ:Gold
April 2, 2014	"High Five"	3	50,409	
September 10, 2014	"Get Up!"	4	34,435	
April 22, 2015	"YOLO moment"	7	21,846	
July 15, 2015	"Tokoton Got It!"	15	8,672	

=== Album ===
Release date	Title	Rank	Sales	Certification
November 26, 2014	"Chapter 1"	8	10,003	

== Solo songs ==
- Garasu no Mahou
- Darkness

=== Featured works ===
==== Albums ====
- 2010: Playzone'10 Road to Playzone Original Soundtrack
- 2011: Playzone'11 Song & Danc'n. Original Soundtrack
- 2012: Playzone'12 Song & Danc'n. Original Soundtrack

==== Video albums ====
- 2010: Playzone'10 Road to Playzone
- 2011: Playzone'11 Song & Danc'n.
- 2012: Playzone'12 Song & Danc'n.

== Filmography ==
=== Movies ===
Year	Title	Role	Notes	Ref
2012	John Carter	Edgar Rice Burroughs	Japanese dub	
2016	Haunted Campus	Shinji Yagami	First movie role.	
2016	Kansai Johnny's Jr. no Mesase dream stage	Mitsuru Naruse		
2017	Laughing Under the Clouds	Soramaru Kumō		
2021	189	Taiga Sakamoto	Lead role	

=== TV dramas ===
Year	Title	Role	TV network	Ref
2008	Battery	Takumi Harada	NHK	
2009	Samurai Tenkosei	Yuta Mifune	KTV	
2009	Koishite Akuma	Luka Kuromiya	Fuji TV	
2010	Hidarime Tantei Eye	Masaki Kaito	NTV	
2011	Honto ni Atta Kowai Hanashi	Shunsuke Mikami	Fuji TV	
2012	Tsubasa yo! Are ga Koi no Hi da	Satoshi Sano	KTV	
2012	Piece	Hikaru Narumi/Hiro	NTV	
2013	Pintokona	Ichiya Sawayama/Hiroki Hongo	TBS	
2014	Smoking Gun	Jotaro Matsui	Fuji TV	
2014	Yamamura Misa Suspense: Red Hearse 33	Takajiro Sugita	Fuji TV	

=== Variety shows ===
Dates	Title	TV network
October 9, 2012 – February 26, 2013	Bakusho Gakuen Nasebana~ru!	MBS
April 6, 2013 –	Tsutaete Pikacchi	NHK

== Concerts ==
- First concert Winter 2006 (December 6–25, 2006, Osaka Sochikuza)
- Hey!Say! JUMP Debut & First Concert Ikinari in Tokyo Dome!(December 22, 2007, Tokyo Dome)
- 2007 Kinga Shinnen Akemashite Omedetou Johnny's Jr. Dai Shugo (January 2,3,4,6,7, 2007; Hon budokan)
- Kansai Johnny's Jr. Osaka-jo Hall First Concert (May 6, 2007, Osaka-Jo Hall)
- Kansai Johnny's Jr. Osaka Sochikuza 2007 (August 6–23, 2007, Osaka Sochikuza)
- Johnny's Jr. Hey Say 07 in Yokohama Arena (September 23&24, 2007, Yokohama Arena)
- Forum Shinkiroku! Johnny's Jr 1ka 4koen yaru zo! Concert (June 7, 2009, Tokyo Kokusai Forum)
- Kansai Johnny's Jr. Ume (Yume) Concert 2009(June 18–20, 200)
- Natsu yasumi Johnny's Jr. Shenin shugo (August 18, 2009, Tokyo Kokusai Forum)
- Kansai Johnny's Jr. x Masu yade! Zenin shugo! @Osaka Sochizuka 09 (December 21–25, 2009)
- Haru Yasumi all Kansai Johnny's Jr. with Nakayama Yuma in Osaka-Jo Hall(March 28&29, 2010)
- Nenmatsu Yangu Tozai Utagassen! Tozai Jr. Senbatsu dai shugo 2010 (November 27, 2010, NHK Hall)
- Kansai Johnny's Jr with Nakayama Yuma 2011 Haru (March 5 – April 9, 2011; 7Toshi)
- Hey! Say! JUMP & Yuuki 100% (March 28 – May 29, 2011; 8Toshi)
- Nakayama Yuma with Kansai Johnny's Jr. (November 23, 2012, ORIX Gekijo)
- Nakayama Yuma Chapter 1 Uta oze! Odoro ze! YOLO ze! TOUR (May 2015)

== Stage plays ==
- Playzone 2010: Road to Playzone
- Playzone 2011: Song & Danc'n
- Shinshun Takizawa Kakumei 2011
- Shinshun Takizawa Kakumei 2012
- Playzone 2012: Song & Danc'n Part II.
- Johnny's World 2013
- Playzone 2013: Song & Danc'n Part III
- ANOTHER
- Playzone in NISSAY
- PLAYZONE 1986････2014★Thank you！〜Aoyama Theater★
- Playzone 2015

== Radio ==
- Look at You-Ma, bayfm (July 5–26, 2009); July Special program
- Nakayama Yuma no Natsu gasshuku (Nakayama Yuma's summer camp), JFN(August 2009); August Special program
- Nakayama Yuma Radio Catch, JFN (2009–present)
- Gachi・Kin (Interview appearance), ABC Radio (November 23, 2012)
- Look at You-Ma, bayfm (January 3, 2013 – March 31, 2016); every Thursdays from 24:30～24:54

== Endorsements ==
- Haichuu (Morinaga, 2009–2011)
- Tongari Corn (House Foods Corporation, 2011–present)
