= 63rd NHK Kōhaku Uta Gassen =

- Also known as: 63th Kouhaku Utagassen: Uta de Aitai
- Created by: Tsumoru Kondo
- Presented by: Yumiko Udō
- Starring: Arashi; Maki Horikita
- Theme music composer: Kenji Kawai
- Opening theme: "Meet the Music"
- Ending theme: "Hotaru no Hikari"
- Composers: Tsunaki Mihara & The New Bleed

Production
- Production locations: NHK Hall; Tokyo, Japan
- Running time: 1st Half: 100 minutes 2nd Half: 165 minutes
- Production company: NHK

Original release
- Network: NHK-G; NHK World Premium
- Release: December 31, 2012

The 63rd NHK Kōhaku Uta Gassen (第63回NHK紅白歌合戦), referred to from hereon as "Kōhaku", aired December 31, 2012 from NHK Hall in Japan beginning from 7:15 p.m. JST.

== Broadcast ==
On December 18, 2012, NHK announced it will broadcast Kōhaku live using ultra-high-definition television technology from two locations: Tokyo Tower and at NHK's Yokohama station. NHK first used UHDTV for a Kōhaku during its 57th event in 2006.

== Performance order ==
Debuting or returning artists are in bold.

Red Team				White Team			
Order	Singer/Group	Appearances	Song	Order	Singer/Group	Appearances	Song
First Part
1	Ayumi Hamasaki	14	2012 A Special Medley (Note: Ayumi Hamasaki: "Dearest", Evolution", and "Surreal")	2	NYC	4	NYC Kōhaku Medley (Note: NYC: "Haina!", "Yume Tamago", and "Yūki 100%")
3	**SKE48**	Debut	"Pareo wa Emerald"	4	**Golden Bomber**	Debut	"Memeshikute"
6	**Mika Nakashima**	9	"Hatsukoi"	5	AAA	3	"777 (We Can Sing a Song!)"
8	Nana Mizuki	4	"Bright Stream"	7	**Sandaime J Soul Brothers**	Debut	"Hanabi"
"Uta de Aitai" Special Project: Dream Stage (Note: Dream Stage: Arashi, "Mickey Mouse March"; AKB48, Kanjani8, "Supercalifragilisticexpialidocious"; Perfume, "Bibbidi-Bobbidi-Boo")
10	Ayako Fuji	18	"Wasurenai"	9	Funky Monkey Babys	4	"Sayonara Janai"
12	Kaori Mizumori	10	"Hitori Nagaragawa"	11	**HY**	2	"Ichiban Chikaku ni"
14	Koda Kumi	8	"Go to the Top"	13	**Naoto Inti Raymi**	Debut	"Brave"
16	**Kaori Kozai**	16	"Sake no Yado"	15	Takashi Hosokawa	36	"Naniwabushi dayo Jinsei wa"
18	Kana Nishino	3	"Go For It!!"	17	Porno Graffitti	11	"Kageboushi"
20	Natsuko Godai	19	"Koi Zange"	19	**Hiroshi Tachi**	2	"Arashi o Yobu Otoko"
22	Ayaka	6	"Hajimari no Toki"	21	Shinichi Mori	45	"Fuyu no Riviera"
"Uta de Aitai" Special Project: Maki Horikita Presents Tōhoku Earthquake Recovery Support Song "Hana wa saku"
Second Part
24	**Momoiro Clover Z**	Debut	Momoiro Kōhaku da Z!! (Note: Momoiro Clover Z: "Saraba, Itoshiki Kanashimitachi yo" and "Ikuze! Kaitō Shōjo")	23	**Kanjani Eight**	Debut	Hatsu Kōhaku!! Zenryoku Zenshin Jajajajān!!! (Note: Kanjani Eight: "Naniwa Iroha Bushi" and "Musekinin Hero")
26	Perfume	5	"Spring of Life"	25	Tokio	19	"Kibou"
28	AKB48	5	AKB48 Kōhaku 2012 SP ~Chapter 2~ (Note: AKB48: "Uza", "Gingham Check", and "Manatsu no Sounds Good!")	27	**Kobukuro**	7	"Kami Hikōki"
30	Aiko	11	"Kuchibiru"	29	Hiromi Go	25	"Denjarā☆"
32	**Kyary Pamyu Pamyu**	Debut	Kōhaku 2012 Kyary Pamyu Pamyu Medley (Note: Kyary Pamyu Pamyu: "Fashion Monster" and "Tsukematsukeru")	31	Hiroshi Itsuki	42	"Yoake no Blues"
"Uta de Aitai" Special Project: Nippon no Arashi "Furusato"
34	**Saori Yuki**	13	"Yoake no Skirt"	33	Hideaki Tokunaga	7	"Ue o Muite Arukou"
36	Yoshimi Tendo	17	"Sōran Matsuri-Bushi"	35	**Kazuyoshi Saito**	Debut	"Yasashiku Naritai"
37	**Yui**	Debut	"Good-bye Days"	38	Kiyoshi Hikawa	13	"Sakura"
39	Fuyumi Sakamoto	24	"Yozakura Oshichi"	40	Arashi	4	New Year's Eve Medley 2012 (Note: Arashi: "Wild at Heart" and "Face Down")
42	Akiko Wada	36	"Ai, Todokimasuka"	41	**Akihiro Miwa**	Debut	"Yoitomake no Uta"
"Uta de Aitai" Special Project Red Team Special Guest: Misia, White Team Special Guest: Eikichi Yazawa (Note: Misia: "Everything" and "Ashita e"; Eikichi Yasawa: "It's Up To You")
44	**Yuki**	Debut	"Prism"	43	Exile	8	"Rising Sun"
46	**Princess Princess**	Debut	"Diamonds"	45	Masaharu Fukuyama	5	"Beautiful Life"
47	Sayuri Ishikawa	35	"Amagi-goe"	48	Saburō Kitajima	49	"Fūsetsu Nagare Tabi"
49	Ikimono-gakari	5	"Kaze ga Fuiteiru"	50	SMAP	20	SMAP 2012'SP (Note: SMAP: "Moment" and "Sakasama no Sora")

== Personnel ==
=== Main host and team leaders ===
- Red Team Captain: Maki Horikita
- White Team Captain: Arashi)
- Mediator: Yumiko Udō

=== Live comments ===
- Announcer NHK Radio 1: Minori Aoi, Naoko Hashimoto
- Kōhaku Ura Talk: Terry Ito, Kouji Komatsu
- Overseas Relay: Yuka Kubota (Portland, Oregon)

=== Judges ===
- Haruka Ayase (actress), played Niijima Yae in Taiga Yae no Sakura
- Naoki Ogi (Hosei University professor)
- Homare Sawa (football player), won FIFA World Player of the Year
- Nakamura Kankurō VI (Kabuki actor), received the 6th generation Nakamura Kankurō name
- Kirin Kiki (actress), won the Special Grand Prix of the jury at Montreal World Film Festival
- Katsura Bunshi VI (Rakugoka), received the 6th generation Katsura Bunshi name
- Saori Yoshida (freestyle wrestler), gold medal at the 2012 Summer Olympics, was awarded the People's Honour Award
- Ryosuke Irie (swimmer), silver and bronze medal at the 2012 Summer Olympics
- Yoko Kanno (composer), composed the Tōhoku Earthquake Recovery Support Song, "Hana wa Saku"
- Harumafuji Kōhei (sumo wrestler), won the Honbasho and was promoted to Yokozuna

=== Special guests ===
- Nobuyuki Tsujii
- Pink Martini
- Kyoji Yamamoto
- Masaaki Hirao

== Korean performances non-existent ==
The 63rd event is faced with controversy over the non-existence of acts from South Korea In one source, it is suspected that government-funded NHK avoided inviting Korean acts because of the territorial disputes over Liancourt Rocks between the South Korean and Japanese governments. Sports Chosun reported on a statement made by an NHK representative. "The fact that President Lee Myung Bak has demanded an apology is a great factor. After this incident occurred, there have been more and more hallyu stars who have stated that 'Dokdo is ours.' Considering this, viewers might have ill feelings about the K-pop stars appearing," said the NHK representative.
