= Ryosuke Yamada =

Japanese singer, actor and streamer (born 1993)

- 山田 涼介
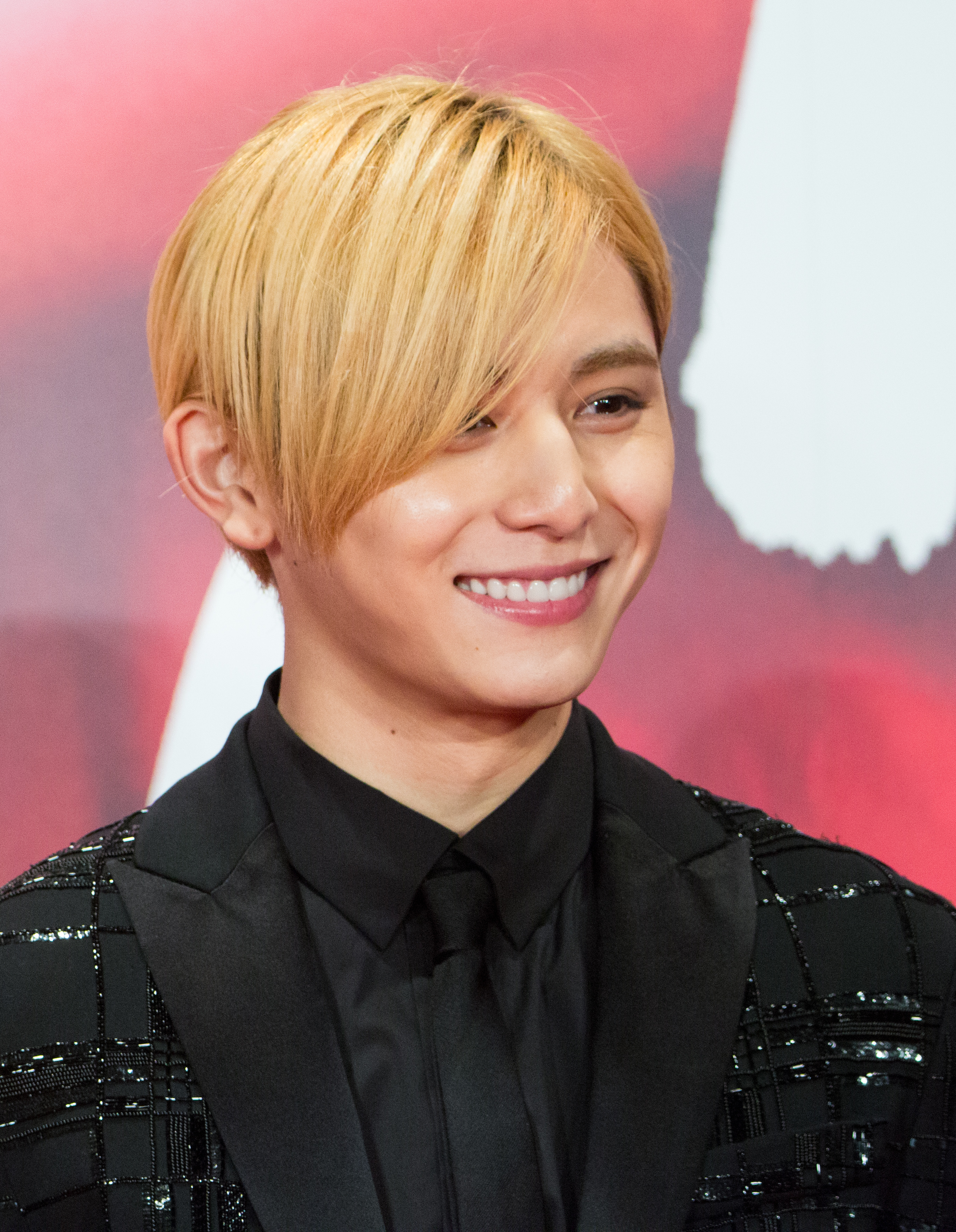
- Yamada at Opening Ceremony of the Tokyo International Film Festival in 2017
- Born: May 9, 1993 (age 33); Tokyo, Japan
- Education: Horikoshi High School
- Occupations: Singer; actor
- Years active: 2004–present
- Musical career
- Genres: J-pop; R&B; electropop; dance-pop; electronic; hip hop; dance; electronic dance
- Instrument: Vocals
- Labels: Starto Entertainment; Storm Labels
- Member of: Hey! Say! JUMP; NYC; J.J. Express

Japanese name
- Kanji: 山田 涼介
- Hiragana: やまだ りょうすけ
Transcriptions
- Romanization: Yamada Ryosuke

Ryosuke Yamada (Japanese: 山田 涼介, Hepburn: Yamada Ryōsuke; born May 9, 1993) is a Japanese singer and actor. He is a member of Hey! Say! JUMP.

Yamada rose to prominence as a teen idol in 2007 following his role in the Japanese television series Tantei Gakuen Q. After launching his music career in 2007 as a member of Hey! Say! JUMP, he released his debut solo single, "Mystery Virgin" in 2013.

Besides his music group activities, he mainly focuses on acting. As an actor, he is best known for portraying Hajime Kindaichi in live-action drama series Kindaichi Case Files (2013–2014), Nagisa Shiota in Assassination Classroom (2015–2016), and Edward Elric in the live-action film series Fullmetal Alchemist (2017–2022). Yamada's portrayal of Nagisa Shiota earned him the 2016 Japan Academy Award for Newcomer of the Year.

== Career ==
=== 2004–2005: Career beginnings ===
Yamada began his career as an entertainer after entering Johnny & Associates at the age of ten. His mother, who was a fan of KinKi Kids, sent an application for an audition which recruited trainees for future male idols. The audition took place during the summer of 2004 and was aired in a segment of a Japanese television program, Ya-Ya-yah. Yamada made his first television appearance in August.

Yamada was a member of the Johnny's Jr. unit J.J.Express, which was formed between 2004 and 2007, together with other future members of Hey! Say! Jump, of A.B.C-Z, and Snow Man.

He began working as a backup dancer for Tackey & Tsubasa, NEWS, Kanjani8, and KAT-TUN and appeared regularly on Shounen Club from autumn 2004.

=== 2006–2007: Tantei Gakuen Q and Hey! Say! JUMP ===
Following his success as a dancer, he began acting. In 2006, he made his acting debut in a two-hour television live action drama, Tantei Gakuen Q SP, as Ryu Amakusa.

In April 2007, he was selected to be a member of a temporary group, Hey! Say! 7. The group made their CD debut on August 1, 2007, with a number-one single "Hey! Say!". The band was created by Johnny Kitagawa and it was stated at the time that it would be active for six months until September 2007.

From July 2007, a three-month series of Tantei Gakuen Q was launched and Yamada reprised his role as Ryu Amakusa. The series became a hit, and Yamada rose to prominence.

In September 2007, Hey! Say! 7 expanded. Johnny & Associates announced that the new group, Hey! Say! JUMP, would be launched. Yamada was selected as one of the ten (now seven) members. He debuted on November 14, 2007, with a number one single "Ultra Music Power".

=== 2008–2009: Early acting and NYC Boys ===
In 2008, Yamada furthered his acting career. From January to March 2008, he appeared in the three-month long television drama series One-Pound Gospel, with Kazuya Kamenashi. On April 12, he played a main role in a two-hour drama episode, Sensei wa Erai, as Hayato Gunjou.

On June 14, he played the main role in Furuhata Chuugakusei, the sequel to Furuhata Ninzaburo, a Japanese drama series aired since 1994. From October to December 2008, he played the main role, Toichi Takasugi, in a three-month long television drama series, Scrap Teacher, along with Daiki Arioka, Yuto Nakajima and Yuri Chinen.

In June 2009, it was announced that Yamada would be working as the lead singer of temporary group, NYC Boys. The band debuted with a number one single, "NYC". On December 31, 2009, the band appeared on Kohaku Uta Gassen.

In the summer of 2009, Yamada returned to acting, appearing in Niini no koto o Wasurenaide, a two-hour television drama episode aired as a segment of an annual television show, 24 Hour Television.

On October 3, 2009, he played the main role in Hidarime Tantei Eye SP.

=== 2010–2012: NYC, The Smurfs, Perfect Son and Johnny's World ===
From January 2010, Hidarime Tantei EYE became a three-month long television series and Yamada once again played the main role. His bandmate Yuma Nakayama guest starred in the first two episodes. Hey! Say! JUMP's sixth single "Hitomi no Screen" was used as the theme song for the series.

In March 2010, it was announced that Yamada and two other leading members of NYC boys would form a new group called NYC, leaving behind the remaining four members. NYC released a number one single "Yuuki 100%" on April 7, 2010. From this point on, Yamada began performing as a singer of two groups, Hey! Say! JUMP and NYC.

In September 2011, he played the voice of Clumsy in the Japanese-dubbed version of the film The Smurfs. Hey! Say! JUMP's ninth single, "Magic Power", was used as the theme song for the film.

In 2012, Yamada returned to acting for the first time in two years. He played the main role in Yamada Akiyoshi Monogatari, which was aired on January 2. It was his first time to star in a period drama. From January to March, he starred in a 3-month long television series, Perfect Son, with actress Kyōka Suzuki. Hey! Say! JUMP's 9th single "SUPER DELICATE" was used as the theme song for the series.

From November 2012 to January 2013, he played the lead role in a musical, Johnny's World. For the musical, Yamada performed tight-rope walking every day for three months in each show.

=== 2013–2014: "Mystery Virgin" and Kindaichi Case Files ===
On January 9, 2013, he made his solo debut with a number one single, "Mystery Virgin". The fact that Yamada was in his teens at the time when the single reached number one helped him set several new records in the Japanese music industry. The single debuted at number one in its debut week on the Oricon chart, making him the first teenage male artist in thirty-three years to have a number one debut single as well as being one of the only two artists in history to achieve this milestone.

On January 12, 2013, he starred in a two-hour television special for, Kinda'ichi Shōnen no Jikenbo titled Kindaichi Shonen no Jikenbo Hong Kong Kowloon Zaihou Satsujin Jiken (The Hong Kong Kowloon Treasure Murder Case). He played the main role as Hajime Kindaichi. The show was created to celebrate the 60th anniversary of the Japanese broadcasting company, NTV. Yamada's Mystery Virgin was used as the theme song for the show.

It was later revealed that Shin Kibayashi, writer of the Kindaichi series and Tantei Gakuen Q had envisioned creating a new Kindaichi series with Yamada as Hajime Kindaichi for almost five years. They met on set while filming Tantei Gakuen Q in 2006 and 2007. After filming the show, Kibayashi asked Yamada in person if he could play the role of Kindaichi in the future, for Yamada was only 14 years old at the time, too young to play the role of a high school student.

In early 2014, Ryosuke Yamada reprised his role as Kindaichi and starred in another special titled Kindaichi Shonen no Jiken bo Gokumonjuku Satsujin Jiken (The Prison School Murder Case).

After the specials, Ryosuke was then approached to continue starring as Kindaichi for a new serial drama for the Kindaichi series. The new series will be titled Kindaichi Shonen no Jikenbo N (neo) and started airing in July 2014.

=== 2015: Film debut and 24 Hour Television ===
In March 2015, Yamada made his movie debut as the hero, Shiota Nagisa, in the live-action movie adaptation of the popular manga, Assassination Classroom. The film was successful, topping Japan's box office during opening week.

In August 2015, Hey! Say! JUMP was chosen as the TV personality of NTV's annual 24 Hour Television, which was a program to raise awareness for all the people that are going through hard times, alongside another Johnny's group, V6. Yamada portrayed the hero, Ryohei Sasaki, in the 24 Hour Television drama special called Okaasan, Ore Wa Daijoubu, along with other Johnny's members Takahisa Masuda and Yoshihiko Inohara as cast members. He portrayed a high school student who's passionate about soccer, but suffers from a brain tumor. For the role, Yamada lost 6 kg within a week. In 2022, he was chosen as host personality again, together with the other members of the YouTube channel Jyaninochannel.

Yamada was cast in another film released November 9 called Grasshopper along with Toma Ikuta. The movie ranked number two on its opening week. Yamada received positive reviews for his role as a knife-wielding assassin, including from his veteran co-stars, Toma Ikuta, Tadanobu Asano, and Jun Murakami.

=== 2016–2023: Established actor ===
In 2016, Yamada won Newcomer of the Year in the 39th Japan Academy Prize for his portrayal of Nagisa Shiota in Assassination Classroom. He earned Rookie Actor of the Year in the Japan Movie Critics Awards for his role as Semi in Grasshopper.

On May 24, 2016, it was announced that Yamada would star as Edward Elric in the live-action film Fullmetal Alchemist based on the manga and anime of the same name. The film released December 2017 to mixed reviews. It was followed by two sequels released in 2022: Fullmetal Alchemist: The Revenge of Scar and Fullmetal Alchemist: The Final Alchemy, in which Yamada starred alongside Dean Fujioka and Mackenyu. They were released on 20 May and 24 June 2022 respectively. The films became available as a trilogy on Netflix on 20 August and 24 September respectively.

Yamada was cast as the lead in Fuji TV's getsu 9 (prime-time slot) fall drama, Cain and Abel. It aired in October 2016. It marked Yamada's first drama with a romantic love angle; he was also the first Heisei from Johnny's to star in a getsu 9. The story is adapted from the Bible's Old Testament, and was a remake of the American film, East of Eden starring James Dean. Yamada plays a salaryman who falls in love with his brother's girlfriend and is hungry for the affection of his father. For his role, Yamada was the youngest person to be nominated as Best Leading Actor in the Autumn TV Drama Academy Award 2016.

On December 2, 2016, Yamada was cast as a lead in Miracles of the Namiya General Store based on the best-selling novel of the same name by award-winning writer, Higashino Keigo. It tells the story of two people living in different eras (1980 and 2012) connected by a letter, a story depicting human bonds and miracles. Yamada portrayed a delinquent who stumbles upon a mysterious store that leads to events that change his life. The movie was directed by Ryuichi Hiroki; filming was expected to start January 2017 and slated for an autumn 2017 release.

Yamada's performance in Miracles of the Namiya General Store received generally positive reviews. Co-star Nishida Toshiyuki praised his performance, calling him the Japanese version of James Dean, and wrote a special letter for him appreciating his acting. The movie was nominated for six different categories at the 41st Japan Academy Awards, including Best Picture and Best Director.

Both Miracles of the Namiya General Store and Fullmetal Alchemist debuted at number 1 at the Japanese box office for opening weekend. Yamada's performances earned him the Newcomer Actor Award at the 91st Kinema Junpo Awards, making him the second Johnny's talent to achieve the award after Ikuta Toma.

In the winter of 2018, Yamada was cast as the lead to the NTV Saturday 10pm drama Momikeshite Fuyu, a family comedy about three elite siblings: a doctor, a lawyer, and a police officer who struggles to cover up scandals related to their family. Yamada plays the youngest child, a police officer who graduates from the University of Tokyo and struggles to be accepted by his family under the shadows of his older siblings. The series premiered January 13, 2018, with a rating of 13.3%.

On August 18, 2023, Yamada announced on his Instagram the release of 2 photobooks to celebrate his 30th birthday, as well as the 10th anniversary of solo debut. The books were released January 30. On May 31, 2024, it was announced that Yamada's photo collection "Ryosuke Yamada's 30th Anniversary Premium BOX [First Press Limited Edition]" had won the top spot in the "Oricon First Half 'Book' Ranking", "Men's Photo Books" genre, with 80000 copies sold. Yamada said about the accolade: "This year marks the 20th anniversary of my arrival at the Agency, so I think it is truly thanks to everyone that I was able to win the first place in the prestigious Oricon rankings in such a milestone year." In addition, the regular editions of his books "Luminous" (41000 copies sold) and "Think Note" (28000 copies sold), both part of the limited edition box, ranked 5th and 6th, respectively, in the same chart.

=== 2024: A return to solo music ===
Yamada released his first solo single in 12 years. The single, "Switch", was released in digital form on Christmas Eve. About the song, Yamada said: "This song was born out of my desire to liven up entertainment with my own power as I go to a new stage, so I would be happy if that feeling reaches many people". Of his decision to release a solo after so long, he commented: "Twelve years ago, I was reluctant to go solo, but now that each member has a solid foundation and what they want to do, I am able to take on a positive challenge on my own". A special campaign offered different design images to those who purchased the single through the different downloading platforms. Additionally, Yamada's label launched official accounts on X and TikTok to share updates related to his solo activities.

Yamada releases his second digital solo single on February 19, 2025. "snow moon" is referred to as a "Winter Medium Ballad", in contrast to the edgy and danceable song his previous single was. The music video for the song will be released on February 12. Special images will be offered to all who download the song, with different images per downloading site.

On March 14, 2025, Yamada released the MV for "Red", the title track from Yamada's first solo album, which is scheduled for release on April 16. The song, written by Ken Ito, Yuuki Tsujimura and Yamada's fellow HSJ member Daiki Arioka, is about "breaking out of your shell and exposing yourself to a new you". Created with the image of a king's cloak dyed red, by shedding the hidden self (Cloak) and breaking out of the shell, a new self, different from before, is exposed. Then, shushing appears in the song in the sense of "controlling the noise from the crowd", followed by the whistling of the "king", who lightly pokes at the ears. With these as a cue, the scenery and development of both the music and the world of the MV change color.

=== 2025 – present: More activities ===
On March 17, 2025, it was announced that Yamada would be brand ambassador for Maybelline Japan's Super Stay Cream Pact Foundation. On February 10, 2026, Yamada was announced as Maybelline New York Japan's ambassador. At the event, he revealed images of a new campaign and CM for "Maybelline Super Stay Lumi Matte Liquid Foundation".

On January 14, 2026, Yamada released a new single, "Blue Noise", on CD (his first) and digital. The song is the theme song of anime The Blue Wolves of Mibu.

Yamada will hold his first solo dome tour in 2026, a first also for the agency. The "Ryosuke Yamada Dome Tour 2026 Are You Red.Y？" takes place in June (Osaka) and July (Tokyo).

Yamada released the music video for "Magic Music", the lead song on his second album, "Are you Red.Y" on April 27, 2026, in Hey! Say! Jump's YouTube.

On May 7, 2026, it was revealed that Yamada was chosen, together with Kaori Sakamoto and Kotaro Koizumi, as ambassador for the NTV yearly SDGs campaign "Good for the Planet Week".

On July 20, 2026 it was announced that Yamada would be appearing on NHK's taiga drama Brothers in Arms. This is the first time that Yamada appears on a taiga drama.

== Discography ==
=== Albums ===
Title	Album details	Peak chart positions	Sales	Certifications
Title	Album details	JPN	Sales	Certifications
Red	Released: April 16, 2025; Label: Storm; Formats: CD, CD+DVD, CD+Blu-ray, digital download, streaming	1	JPN: 114,910	RIAJ: Gold (phy.)
Are You Red.Y?	Release: May 20, 2026; Label: Storm; Formats: CD, CD+DVD, CD+Blu-ray, digital download, streaming; Editions: Limited 1 & 2, regular, fan club limited	1	JPN: 117,746	RIAJ: Gold (phy.)

=== Singles ===
Release date	Title	Peak position	Sales	Certification
January 9, 2013	"Mystery Virgin"	1	219,871	RIAJ: Gold (phy.)
May 22, 2019	"Oh! My Darling" (double A-side single Lucky-Unlucky/Oh! my darling) by Hey! Say! JUMP)	1	199,436	RIAJ: Platinum (phy.)
December 24, 2024	"Switch" (digital single)	—		
February 19, 2025	"Snow Moon" (digital single)	—		
January 14, 2026	"Blue Noise" (CD single)	1	98,180	RIAJ: Gold (phy.)

=== Music videos ===
Year	Song	Original artist	Date	Notes	Ref.
2005	"Seishun Amigo"	Shuuji to Akira		(Jr. era. There is no DVD/MV available to the public. All existing images are from era programs, such as Music Station's appearance)	
2006	"Venus"	Tackey & Tsubasa		(Jr. era. Yamada is in the choreography video in the DVD accompanying the limited edition video)	
2006	"Fever to Future"	Kitty GYM		(Jr. era. Yamada appears as a backdancer in the music video)	
2013	"Mystery Virgin"	Ryosuke Yamada			
2013	"Moonlight"	Ryosuke Yamada			
2019	"Oh! my darling"	Ryosuke Yamada		Included in Hey Say Jump's single "Lucky / Unlucky - Oh! my darling" limited edition 2	
2024	"Switch"	Ryosuke Yamada	December 25, 2024	Included in album "Red"	
2025	"snow moon"	Ryosuke Yamada	February 12, 2025	Included in album "Red"	
2025	"Red"	Ryosuke Yamada	March 14, 2025	Included in album "Red"	
2025	"Bloomin'"	Ryosuke Yamada	7 July 2025	Included in album "Red"	
2025	"Blue Noise"	Ryosuke Yamada	December 21, 2025	Included in the "Blue Noise" single	
2025	"High High High"	Ryosuke Yamada	December 25, 2025	Included in the "Blue Noise" single	
2026	"Magic Music"	Ryosuke Yamada	April 27, 2026	Included in album "Are You Red.Y?"	
2026	"Venom"	Ryosuke Yamada	May 14, 2026	Included in album "Are You Red.Y?"	
2026	"Dive"	Ryosuke Yamada	May 23, 2026	Included in album "Are You Red.Y?"	

=== Credits ===
Year	Album / Song	Artist	Credit
2010	JUMP No. 1 / "Shinku"	Hey! Say! JUMP	Writer
2012	JUMP World / "Hana Egao"	Hey! Say! 7	Writer
2013	"Gin no Sekai ni Negai o Komete"	Ryosuke Yamada	Writer
2014	S3ART / "Candle"	Hey! Say! JUMP	Writer
2015	JUMPing CAR / "Sangatsu Juuyokka~Tokei"	Keito Okamoto, Ryosuke Yamada	Writer

=== Blu-ray/DVD ===
Year	Release date	Title
2006	February 15	Endless Shock
2006	June 28	DREAM BOYS
2006	August 30	Takizawa Hideaki Arigato 2005 Sayonara
2007	July 18	Takizawa Enbujo
2008	January 23	One! The History of Tackey
2008	September 3	One-Pound Gospel
2008	December 3	Furuhata Chugakusei: Shogai Saisho no Jiken
2009	March 4	Tantei Gakuen Q
2009	April 22	Scrap Teacher: Kyoshi Saisei
2009	October 28	Niini no koto Wasurenaide
2010	March 17	Hidarime Tantei Eye SP
2010	May 26	Hidarime Tantei Eye
2012	February 3	The Smurfs
2012	July 18	Perfect Son
2013	March 13	Kindaichi Case Files Neo
2015	September 25	Assassination Classroom
2015	December 23	Okaasan Ore wa Daijoubu
2016	April 28	Grasshopper
2016	March 25	Assassination Classroom: Graduation
2017	May 10	Cain and Abel
2023	June 9	My Dearest Self with Malice Aforethought

== Filmography ==
=== Dramas ===
Year	Title	Role	Notes	Ref.
2006	Tantei Gakuen Q SP	Ryu Amakusa	TV movie	
2007	Tantei Gakuen Q	Ryu Amakusa	Sequel to the TV movie	
2008	One-Pound Gospel	Katsumi Mukoda		
2008	Sensei wa Erai!	Hayato Gunjou	Lead role; TV movie	
2008	Furuhata Chugakusei	Ninzaburo Furuhata	Lead role; TV movie	
2008	Scrap Teacher: Kyoushi Saisei	Toichi Takasugi	Lead role	
2009	Niini no Koto o Wasurenaide	Yuji Kawai	TV movie	
2009	Hidarime Tantei EYE SP	Ainosuke Tanaka	Lead role; TV movie	
2010	Hidarime Tantei Eye	Ainosuke Tanaka	Lead role	
2012	Yamada Akiyoshi Monogatari	Akiyoshi Yamada	Lead role; TV movie	
2012	Perfect Son	Daichi Suzuki	Lead role	
2013	Kindaichi Case Files SP 1	Hajime Kindaichi	Lead role; TV movie	
2013	Kyou no Hi wa Sayounara	Nobuo Harada	TV movie	
2014	Kindaichi Case Files SP 2	Hajime Kindaichi	Lead role; TV movie	
2014	Kindaichi Case Files Neo	Hajime Kindaichi	Lead role	
2014	Hell Teacher Nube	Zekki	Guest appearance (ep. 9)	
2015	Okaasan, Ore wa Daijoubu	Sasaki Ryohei	Lead role; TV movie	
2016	Cain and Abel	Yū Takada	Lead role	
2018	The Kitazawas: We Mind Our Own Business	Kitazawa Shusaku	Lead role	
2019	The Kitazawas: Summer 2019	Kitazawa Shusaku	Lead role; TV movie	
2019	Semi Otoko	Semio / Cicada	Lead role	
2020	K2: Dodgy Badge Brothers	Kanzaki Ryuichi	Lead role	
2022	Is My Kawaii About to Expire?	Maruya Kosuke	Lead role	
2022	The Killer Inside	Eiji Urashima / Eiji Hachinoi "B-Ichi"	Lead role	
2023	Kissing the Ring Finger	Tōgō Nitta		
2024	Billion x School	Rei Kagami	Lead role	
2025	I'm a D-list Handler	Sanada Yuji		
2025	Tales of the Unusual 35th Anniversary Special	Tokunaga	Lead role (in 1/4 stories)	
2026	Labyrinth of Hortensia and the Minotaur	Yu Nanase	Lead role	
2026	Brothers in Arms	Toyotomi Hidetsugu	Taiga drama	

=== Film ===
Year	Title	Role	Notes	Ref.
2011	The Smurfs	Clumsy (voice)	Japanese dub	
2015	Assassination Classroom	Nagisa Shiota	Lead role	
2015	Grasshopper	Semi/Cicada		
2016	Assassination Classroom: Graduation	Nagisa Shiota	Lead role	
2017	Miracles of the Namiya General Store	Atsuya	Lead role	
2017	Fullmetal Alchemist	Edward Elric	Lead role	
2020	The Memory Eraser	Ryoichi Yoshimori	Lead role	
2021	Baragaki: Unbroken Samurai	Okita Sōji		
2022	What to Do with the Dead Kaiju?	Arata Obinata	Lead role	
2022	Fullmetal Alchemist: The Revenge of Scar	Edward Elric	Lead role	
2022	Fullmetal Alchemist: The Final Alchemy	Edward Elric	Lead role	
2023	Bad Lands	Joe		
2024	Silent Love	Aoi	Lead role	

=== Shows ===
Year	Title	Notes	Ref.
2004–2007	Ya-Ya-yah (program)	As Hey! Say! 7	
2004–2013	Shounen Club	Host (as himself and as part of HSJ); guest	
2006–2007	You Tachi!	As part of Kitty Jr./Hey! Say! 7/Hey! Say! Jump	
2007–2008	Bakushō 100-bu terebi! Heisei Families	As part of Hey! Say! 7/Hey! Say! Jump	
2008–2009	Toki Kūkan Sedai Battle Shōwa × Heisei Show wa Hey! Say!	As part of Hey! Say! 7/Hey! Say! Jump	
2011–2013	Yan Yan JUMP	As part of Hey! Say! Jump	
2009–present	School Kakumei!		
2015–present	Little Tokyo Life		
2015–present	Itadaki High JUMP		
2025	Ubugoe	First solo MC	
2025–present	Tanuki to Kitsune	MC	
2026	Minakute mo yoi no ni mitakunaru terebi	MC	

=== Animation voice actor ===
Year	Title	Role	Notes	Ref.
2025	Zootopia 2	Pawbert	Japanese dub	

== Other activities ==
=== YouTube and SNS ===
A new Johnny's YouTube channel called ジャにのちゃんねる (Janinochaneru), led by Arashi's Kazunari Ninomiya, was opened on April 25, 2021. Yamada was revealed as the fourth member to participate, on April 28. He was revealed in the channel's 4th official video following 3 others announcing the other Johnny's members that would be a part of the new channel.

On August 18, 2023, Yamada opened an Instagram account, posting casual photos. Later that day, he streamed live, announcing the release of a pair of photobooks to celebrate his upcoming 30th birthday and 10th anniversary of his solo debut.

=== Gaming ===
Ryosuke Yamada
- Other name: LEOの遊び場 (Leo no asobiba)

YouTube information
- Channel: LEO's Playground (Ryosuke Yamada)
- Years active: 2021–present
- Genre: Gaming
- Subscribers: 1.04 million
- Views: 102 million
- Last updated: August 1, 2026

On September 15, 2021, Yamada started his own gaming channel, Leo's Playground (LEOの遊び場, Leo no asobiba). Yamada shares live streams and video gameplay of first-person shooter games on the channel, and features other Japanese streamers and VTubers as guests. That same day, he opened a corresponding Twitter account, in which he publishes (mainly) the links to the YouTube videos. Two days later, before a streamed game with Hikakin, Yamada's channel had already reached over 500,000 subscribers, while the Twitter account had 210,000 followers.

On August 20, 2025, Yamada announced, in the CR FES 2025 esport event at Tokyo Dome, that he was joining the professional gaming team Crazy Raccoon in its Star Division, as his gaming persona "Leo". Yamada has been active for many years as a gamer as a side activity from his entertainment career, with games such as Apex Legends. He has participated in several tournaments, such as the one with Crazy Raccoon before, the "9th Crazy Raccoon Cup Apex Legends", held in 2022.

On October 20, 2026, Yamada appeared both as himself and his gaming alter–ego, Leo, in Xross Stars's commercial for the release of their trading card game pack 5, "Ignition Vortex", in which Leo appears as a leader card; his image also appears in the game's attack and memoria cards.

=== Radio ===
- All Night Nippon Premium April 2025, November 2025–March 2026)

== Commercials ==
- Asahi Group Holdings, Ltd.
  - Clear Asahi beer (April 2023) As part of Jyaninochannel
  - Asahi Soft Drinks "Mitsuya Cider" (2021-) With Arashi members Masaki Aiba and Sho Sakurai and Snow Man members Ryohei Abe and Ren Meguro in a series of commercials.
- Bael Co., Ltd. "Blue Lock Blaze Battle" (2023)
- Baskin-Robbins Thirty-One ice cream (2020- )
- Estée Lauder Japan
  - Jo Malone London Japan
- L'Oréal Japan
  - Maybelline Japan SP Stay Cream Pact Foundation
- Mash Group
  - Gelato Pique (2025-)
- Xross Stars
  - TCG "Ignition Vortex" pack (2026) (as himself and gaming persona Leo)

== Tours ==
For post-debut tours, see Hey! Say! JUMP.

=== Pre-debut ===
Year	Title	Artist	Notes	Ref.
2004	Summary of Johnny's World	NEWS, KAT-TUN	August	
2005	Live Kaizokuban Tour	KAT-TUN	December–January	
2005	Spring 05 Looking Concert	KAT-TUN	March	
2005	Spring Yokohama Arena Concert	Ya-Ya-yah	March	
2005	Looking 05 Tour	KAT-TUN	May–June	
2005	Johnny's Theater Summary Digest	NEWS, Ya-Ya-yah	July–September	
2005	Looking 2005ing Concert	KAT-TUN	August	
2005	Arigato 2005 Sayonara Concert	Hideaki Takizawa	December	
2006	Daiboken Concert	Johnny's Jr.	August	
2006	You-tachi no Ongaku Daiundokai Tour	Johnny's Jr.	September–October	
2006	Christmas Concert	Tackey & Tsubasa	December	
2007	Kingashinnen Johnny's Jr. Daishugo Concert	Johnny's Jr.	January	
2007	Concert Tour	NEWS	February–April	
2007	cartoon KAT-TUN II You Tour	KAT-TUN	April–June	
2007	Daiboken Concert	Johnny's Jr.	August	
2007	Hey Say 07 in Yokohama Arena Concert	Johnny's Jr.	September	

=== Solo tour ===
Year	Name	Venue and date	Notes	Ref.
2025	Ryosuke Yamada LIVE TOUR 2025「RED」	Multi-dates and venues April 26–27 Shizuoka Ecopa Arena; May 1–2 Osaka Castle Hall; May 8–9 Miyagi Sekisui Heim Super Arena; May 23–25 Chiba LaLa arena TOKYO-BAY; June 14–15 Hiroshima Green Arena; June 21–22 Fukuoka Marine Messe Fukuoka	Release on DVD / Blu-ray on December 24, 2025.	
2026	Ryosuke Yamada Dome Tour 2026「Are you RED.Y」	June 27–28 Kyocera Dome Osaka; Jul 25–26 Tokyo Dome		

== Musicals ==
Year	Title	Protagonist	Role	Notes	Ref.
2005	Endless Shock	Koichi Domoto		January–February	
2006	DREAM BOYS	KAT-TUN, Kanjani8		January	
2006	Takizawa Enbujyo	Hideaki Takizawa		March–April	
2006	One!-the history of Tackey-	Hideaki Takizawa		September	
2010	Takizawa Kabuki	Hideaki Takizawa	Guest appearance	April–May	
2012–2013	Johnny's World	Hey! Say! JUMP	Lead role	November–January	

== Books ==
- Luminous (photobook) (30 January 2024)
- Think note ~ Shinku no oto ~ (30 January 2024)

== Awards and nominations ==
Year	Award	Category	Nominated work	Result
2016	40th Hochi Film Awards	Best New Artist	Assassination Classroom (live-action) and Grasshopper	Nominated
2016	39th Japan Academy Prize	Newcomers of the Year	Assassination Classroom (live-action)	Won
2016	25th Japan Movie Critics Award	Rookie Actor of the Year	Grasshopper	Won
2017	91st Television Drama Academy Award	Best Actor in a Leading Role	Cain and Abel	Nominated
2018	91st Kinema Junpo Award	Best Newcomer Actor	The Miracles of the Namiya General Store & Fullmetal Alchemist (live-action)	Won
