= Nintama Rantarō =

Japanese anime series

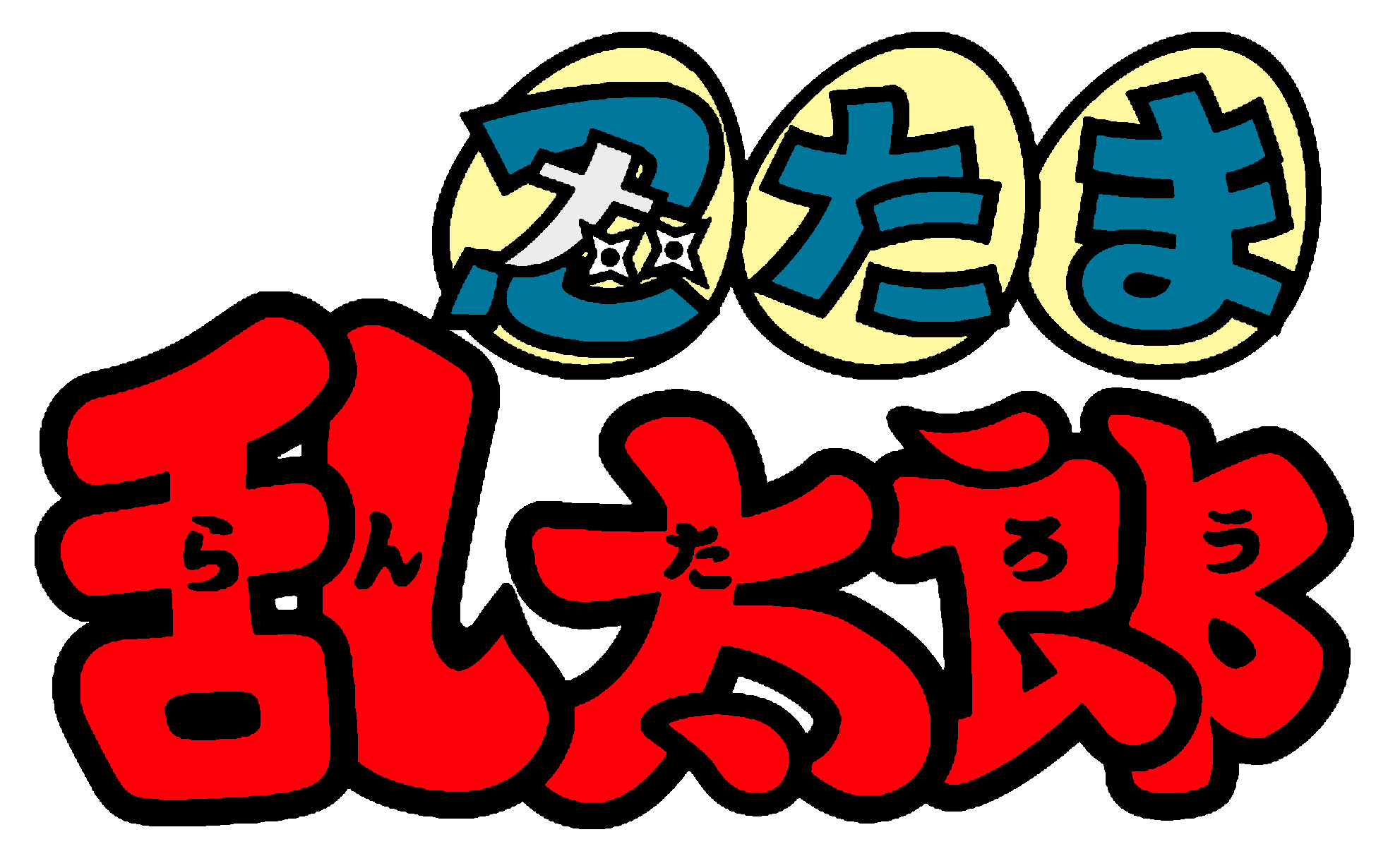
- 忍たま乱太郎
- Genre: Comedy
- Based on: Rakudai Ninja Rantarō by Sōbe Amako
- Developed by: Yoshio Urasawa
- Directed by: Tsutomu Shibayama (chief, seasons 1-20); Hideo Kawauchi (seasons 2-29); Hiroki Negishi (season 30); Tatsuya Nokimori (season 31-present)
- Voices of: Minami Takayama; Mayumi Tanaka; Teiyu Ichiryusai
- Music by: Kouji Makaino
- Country of origin: Japan
- Original language: Japanese
- No. of seasons: 34 (Note: As officially used by NHK.)
- No. of episodes: 2,668 (list of episodes)

Production
- Animators: Ajiado; Gakken (seasons 1-4)
- Production company: NHK

Original release
- Network: NHK General TV
- Release: April 10, 1993 – March 19, 1994
- Network: NHK Educational TV
- Release: October 3, 1994 – present

Related
Further information
Anime film
Eiga Nintama Rantarō
Directed by	Tsuneo Kobayashi; Tsutomu Shibayama (chief director)
Produced by	Masahiro Okamura
Written by	Yoshio Urasawa
Music by	Kouji Makaino
Studio	Ajiado
Released	June 29, 1996
Runtime	45 minutes
Anime film
Gekijō-ban Anime Nintama Rantarō Ninjutsu Gakuen Zenin Shutsudō! no Dan
Directed by	Masaya Fujimori
Produced by	Izumi Nakasawa; Kiyoshi Hanada
Written by	Yoshio Urasawa
Music by	Kouji Makaino
Studio	Ajiado
Released	March 12, 2011
Runtime	80 minutes
Anime film
Gekijō-ban Nintama Rantarō Dokutake Ninja-tai Saikyō no Gunshi
Directed by	Masaya Fujimori
Written by	Kazuhisa Sakaguchi
Music by	Kouji Makaino
Studio	Ajiado
Released	December 20, 2024
Runtime	90 minutes

Nintama Rantarō (忍たま乱太郎; "Rantarō the Ninja Boy") is a Japanese anime series produced by Ajiado and Japanese broadcast on NHK since April 10, 1993. It is an adaptation of the manga series Rakudai Ninja Rantarō, written and illustrated by Sōbe Amako. Nintama Rantarō centers on the title character and his friends as they attend a school for budding ninjas. Like the manga on which it is based, there is a considerable number of anachronisms for comedic purposes; for example, the titular character Rantarō is bespectacled. The anime also references other Japanese media personalities such as Ken Shimura. The series is currently the longest-running anime on NHK. The official English title is Ninjaboy Rantaro.

In July 2011, a live action film version directed by Takashi Miike titled Ninja Kids!!! was released. A sequel was released on July 6, 2013, called Ninja Kids!!! Summer Mission Impossible! (忍たま乱太郎 夏休み宿題大作戦! の段, Nintama Rantarō Natsuyasumi Shukudai Daisakusen! no Dan).

== Characters ==
=== First Year Ha Class ===
Rantarō Inadera (猪名寺 乱太郎, Inadera Rantarō)
Voiced by: Minami Takayama
The main character, a bespectacled first-grade boy who is aiming to become an excellent ninja, but he often gets distracted and prefers to goof off with his friends Kirimaru and Shinbee. Despite not having good vision, he has fast legs.
Kirimaru Settsuno (摂津のきり丸, Settsu no Kirimaru)
Voiced by: Mayumi Tanaka
One of Rantaro's best friends and Tsukkomi. He is an orphan who lost his family and home during a war, and now makes a living doing various part-time jobs. When school isn't in session, he lives with Doi. His primary interest is being obsessed with earning money. He goes crazy whenever he hears the clinging sound of a zeni coin and will go out of his way to obtain it.
Shinbee Fukutomi (福富 しんべヱ, Fukutomi Shinbee)
Voiced by: Teiyū Ichiryūsai
A rich merchant's son, who quickly became friends with Rantarō at the beginning of the series. He is overweight, a bit slower when it comes to thinking, likes to eat a lot, and often has to be corrected by his friends. Nonetheless, he possesses great power and strength. He often has a runny nose, which can sometimes come in handy. When he has a bad hair day, his hair sticks up like a porcupine's quills and can be used a weapon.
Shouzaemon Kuroki (黒木 庄左ヱ門, Kuroki Shouzaemon)
Voiced by: Mami (Series 1-11), Saori Higashi (Series 12-current)
First year Hagumi's class president, he is the smartest kid in the class and the most responsible.
Isuke Ninokuruwa (二郭 伊助, Ninokuruwa Isuke)
Voiced by: Chie Satō, Suzuki Tomiko (Series 2 episode 46)
The son of textile dyers, and something of a neat freak, he is often depicted with a broom or mop, and shares a room with Shouzaemon. His name is derived from Ninokuruwa Isuke, a Fūma ninja.
Danzou Katou (加藤 団蔵, Katou Danzou)
Voiced by: Hiroko Emori, Kaoru Shimamura (Series 4 episode 6)
His father runs a horse and carriage delivery service. Danzou is talented with horses because of this. His writing is terribly messy, to the point of illegibility. He has a platonic crush on Seihachi (清八), one of his father's top employees. He shares a room with Torawaka.
Torawaka Satake (佐武 虎若, Satake Torawaka)
Voiced by: Yūko Kobayashi, Urara Takano (Series 2), Fuuko Shinomiya (Series 3 episode 82)
His father is in charge of the Satake Rifle Squad. Because of this he has much experience with flintlock rifles, which were rare at the time. He idolizes Shousei, a rifle expert who works for his father. He shares a room with Danzou.
Sanjirō Yumesaki (夢前 三治郎, Yumesaki Sanjirō)
Voiced by: Hiroko Emori, Atsuko Mine (Series 2)
A deceptively happy and friendly-looking child who enjoys setting traps, he shares a room with Heidayuu.
Heidayū Sasayama (笹山 兵太夫, Sasayama Heidayū)
Voiced by: Akiko Muta, Hiroko Emori (Series 1)
Heidayū likes traps and has his entire room rigged with them. He shares his room with Sanjiro, who also enjoys traps.
Kingo Minamoto (皆本 金吾, Minamoto Kingo)
Voiced by: Kumiko Watanabe
Joined first year hagumi late, his main weapon is the katana. He shares a room with Kisanta.
Kisanta Yamamura (山村 喜三太, Yamamura Kisanta)
Voiced by: Tomiko Suzuki (Series 1-11), Saori Sugimoto (Series 12-29), Hitomi Ohwada (S25E38-S25SP; S29 - present)
A transfer student, he joined first year hagumi late. He collects slugs as a hobby and shares a room with Kingo.

=== First Year I Class ===
Denshichi Kurokado (黒門 伝七, Kurokado Denshichi)
Voiced by: Yūko Satō
Sakichi Ningyou (任暁 左吉, Ningyou Sakichi)
Voiced by: Kikumi Umeda
Hikoshirou Imafuku (今福 彦四郎, Imafuku Hikoshirou)
Voiced by: Mitsuki Saiga
Class President of first year igumi, his marks often suffer when he doesn't have time to study because of his presidential duties.
Ippei Kaminoshima (上ノ島 一平, Kaminoshima Ippei)
Voiced by: Komatsuna Sakato

=== First Year Ro Class ===
Fushikizou Tsurumachi (鶴町 伏木蔵, Tsurumachi Fushikizou)
Voiced by: Mayumi Oota (Series 11), Touko Aoyama (Series 12-16), Komatsuna Sakato (Series 16-current)
Thrill and suspense.
Ayakashimaru Ninotsubo (二ノ坪 怪士丸, Ninotsubo Ayakashimaru)
Voiced by: Chie Satou
A spooky, gaunt looking boy.
Heita Shimosakabe (下坂部 平太, Shimosakabe Heita)
Voiced by: Kumiko Watanabe (Series 10-16), Sayuri Yoshida (Series 16-current)
Heita is a giant scaredy-cat. Small things often frighten him to the point of making him pee himself.
Magojirō Hatsushima (初島 孫次郎, Hatsushima Magojirō)
Voiced by: Junko Shimakata

=== Second Year ===
Saburōji Ikeda (池田 三郎次, Ikeda Saburōji)
Voiced by: Urara Takano (Series 1-6), Shinobu Adachi (Series 1 episode 46), Fuuko Shinomiya (Series 6 episode 12-current),
Speaks without thinking, and often says too much. He claims to have problems making a friendly face. He enjoys pranking the first years, especially the main trio.
Sakon Kawanishi (川西 左近, Kawanishi Sakon)
Voiced by: Yasuhiro Takato (Series 3, 5, 6, 12), Urarako Suzuki (Series 9, 12, 13), Fujiko Takimoto (Series 9 episode 18), Yukiko Amada (Series 16-current)
A member of the Health Committee, he is often seen making midnight snacks, but often drops them, too. He looks serious but actually has a kind heart and never leaves people who needs help.
Kyūsaku Nose (能勢 久作, Nose Kyūsaku)
Voiced by: Atsuko Mine (Series 1), Ai Satou (Series 1 episode 46-Series 8), Jin Domon (Series 8-current)
Nose has large eyebrows and reddish orange hair. He is a serious and sharp student, but sometimes his sharpness can lead to unnecessary details.
Shirobei Tokitomo (時友 四郎兵衛, Tokitomo Shirobei)
Voiced by: Tomo Adachi
A quiet boy who is a little dumb, but has a serious personality and often play the role of the tsukkomi.
Sekito Haniwa (羽丹羽石人, Haniwa Sekito)
Voiced by: Ayumu Murase
A 2nd-year transfer student who appears in Season 28, his father is a samurai at the Kawataredoki Castle. He is the first character to be reused from Amako Soubei's previous work Hamuko Mairu!.

=== Third Year ===
Magohei Igasaki (伊賀崎 孫兵, Igasaki Magohei)
Voiced by: Hiro Yuuki (Series 1-3), Isshin Chiba (Series 3-current)
Igasaki keeps snakes, scorpions, and bugs as pets. He always keeps his poisonous pet snake, Junko, with him, though she often runs away, leaving Magohei to search frantically for her.
Samon Kanzaki (神崎 左門, Kanzaki Samon)
Voiced by: Kouki Miyata
Kanzaki has literally no sense of direction. He dramatically declares "it's this way!" and then goes in the complete opposite direction.
Sannosuke Tsugiya (次屋 三之助, Tsugiya Sannosuke)
Voiced by: Mari Maruta, Kumiko Watanabe (Series 19 episode 15 only)
Tsugiya also has no sense of direction, but wanders absent mindlessly.
Sakubei Tomatsu (富松 作兵衛, Tomatsu Sakubei)
Voiced by: Touko Aoyama
A third year student who always keeps an eye on Tsugiya and Kanzaki. He has a serious personality but also my-paced in his own way. Recently he developed a sense of responsibility as well.
Tounai Urakaze (浦風 藤内, Urakaze Tounai)
Voiced by: Sumomo Momomori
Urakaze always practices for everything obsessively.
Kazuma Santanda (三反田 数馬, Santanda Kazuma)
Voiced by: Hiro Shimono
A nintama with little presence, who seems to have inherited the Heath Committee's bad luck.

=== Fourth Year ===
Takiyashamaru Tairano (平 滝夜叉丸, Tairano Takiyashamaru)
Voiced by: Wataru Takagi
The ultimate narcissist, Tairano considers himself 'Ninjutsu Gakuen's Number One Idol'. He is very talented with his throwing ring, which he has lovingly named 'Rinko'.
Kihachirō Ayabe (綾部 喜八郎, Ayabe Kihachirō)
Voiced by: Akira Ishida
An expressionless boy who really loves digging holes, it is hard to keep him interested in anything else. He names all the holes that he digs, and he too is called "The Trap Specialist". Most of the Health Committee members have fallen in his traps.
Mikiemon Tamura (田村 三木ヱ門, Tamura Mikiemon)
Voiced by: Shinobu Adachi
The other self-proclaimed "Number One Idol of Ninjutsu Gakuen", Mikiemon likes guns, cannons, and rifles, and names his and takes them for walks. He also idolizes Shousei, but not to the extent that Torawaka does.
Shuichirō Hama (浜 守一郎, Hama Shuichirou)
Voiced by: Yūki Kaji
A transfer student who is ambitious on becoming a ninja. He is the only person who laughs whenever Andou-sensei makes a joke.
Takamaru Saitō (斉藤 タカ丸, Saitō Takamaru)
Voiced by: Daisuke Namikawa
Raised as a hairdresser, his father was an undercover ninja. He eventually joins Ninjutsu Gakuen, and is allowed into fourth year despite having no previous training, because of his skills with his 'split second hairdressing'.

=== Fifth Year ===
Heisuke Kukuchi (久々知 兵助, Kukuchi Heisuke)
Voiced by: Toshimitsu Oda
Long eyelashes and black hair are his defining characteristics. Though his grades are superb and he is earnest and cool, his spontaneous nature was somewhat revealed when he'd failed to realize that the costs of amazake were included in the Explosives Committee's appropriation. Since he had to carry tofu in the Sport's Day relay, he is known as the 'Tofu Kid'. Truthfully he hates this nickname, and in the manga at times he denies liking tofu, but in actuality he is abundant in tofu knowledge and he seems to like tofu cooking. In the anime, he will openly declare his love for tofu and treat others to tofu he has prepared himself. He carries freeze-dried tofu around for a mid-afternoon snack. He is the stand-in committee president for the Explosives Committee and rounds up the underclassmen. Although he is Takamaru's senpai he adds "san" to his name since he is older. In the musical his weapon of choice is the suntetsu. In the survival orienteering he was paired in a group with Isuke. His surname comes from Kukuchi in Amagasaki.
Kanemon Ohama (尾浜 勘右衛門, Ohama Kanemon)
Voiced by: Shigeru Shibuya
Though his first appearance was injuring the napping Rantarou, Kirimaru, and Shinbei while practicing his jinba technique, his existence was forgotten for a period of 16 years, until he reappeared in the mixed double survival orienteering in a pair with Torawaka, where his name was finally revealed. On the second occasion when he appeared he did not belong to any committee and was encouraged in vol. 47 by the Headmaster to decide which committee to join while each one ran their food stand at their culture festival. It was later revealed that he was actually a class president and he ended up joining the class president committee. His specialty weapon is the manrikigusari. He is the airhead type who tends to get wrapped up in things. In the original work he has black hair, but in the anime his hair is a deep reddish brown. In first person he uses "ore"; to his superiors he uses "boku" or "watashi". His surname comes from Ohama-cho in Amagasaki, and his name comes from the Kouga ninja Ukai Kanemon.
Raizō Fuwa (不破 雷蔵, Fuwa Raizou)
Voiced by: Junichi Kanemaru
Gentle and full of kindness, he is a senpai that lovingly takes care of his underclassmen. Though his grades are excellent, his bad habit is that he is always meandering and hesitating with a broad indecisiveness. After thinking too much, he tires and falls asleep right then and there. Of the "three illness of the ninja", he is the "type who lacks thought". Also, if he goes near a dry river bed, the moisture will expand his hair. Hachiya Saburou from the same class is often seen borrowing his face, lending them the relation of "fifth-year rogumi's specialty combination". Yamada-sensei often says "his honesty is his weakness", but in the 18th volume he passed the survival orienteering while retaining his playfulness. In that survival orienteering he was paired in a group with Ayakashimaru. In the original work Raizou's hair is black, but in the anime it is a bright brown. His namesake is from a proverb meaning 'to follow others blindly' (付和雷同, fuwaraido). He shares a room with Saburou.
Saburō Hachiya (鉢屋 三郎, Hachiya Saburou)
Voiced by: Takumi Yamazaki
A student with a thousand face, to the point that no one, including the school staff, knows his true face, Saburo is a mischievous, calm and cool student who enjoys wearing disguises of just about anyone, and sometimes alternates faces in-between scenes. Saburo most of the time disguises as Raizo considering the two are quite close friends. He shares a room with Raizou.
Hachizaemon Takeya (竹谷 八左ヱ門, Takeya Hachizaemon)
Voiced by: Ryuichi Azuma
A student with cheerful, optimistic, energetic and also serious attitude, Hachizaemon features long unkempt dull grey-brown hair. As the head of Biological Committee, he holds responsibility in protecting wildlife from being harmed or hunted, which gains respect from his fellow junior committee members (which is dominated with first years). Attempts of hunting wildlife with his presence will only enrage him. He lives in a room by himself, a result of Raizou and Saburou's suggestion to make it easier for first years to come visit him.

=== Sixth Year ===
Monjirō Shioe (潮江 文次郎, Shioe Monjirou)
Voiced by: Ken Narita
Often portrayed as a leader among the 6th year seniors, Monjiro is a strict, serious senior that focuses on training mentally as much as physically, and his committee members often gets forced into his bizarre trainings such as using 10 kg abacus, sleeping in cold lake at midnight, making weapons out of food, etc. Despite his serious commitments into trainings, he is easily approached outside of training and has good relationship as a caring senior towards his juniors. He has a favourite word - gin gin - that who only used when he gets excited, angry, or emotional. On occasional episodes, he together with Choji and Koheta tagged along with Kirimaru in his part-time job.
Senzō Tachibana (立花 仙蔵, Tachibana Senzou)
Voiced by: Soichiro Hoshi
A pale-skinned and often regarded as a handsome senior with long straight and silky hair, he leads the Saho committee along with Heidayu as his favorite junior. He has natural talents for explosive, bombs, grenades, often carrying dozens of them with him for convenient purpose. Being as normally a calm, rationally thinking senior, he is often described as an excellent student among the seniors. When carrying out solo missions, he often gets tagged along with Kisanta and Shinbei, who both look up to him, but instead of giving a good help, burdens him instead and gets him caught, bomb explodes in his face, trees fall down on him, etc. He has shorter temper for Kisanta and Shinbei harassing him in his missions.
Chōji Nakazaike (中在家 長次, Nakazaike Chouji)
Voiced by: Shigeru Shibuya
A student who spoke with few words and with few facial expressions, Choji, who speaks slowly, that made his words hard to be conveyed at times, is also the head of librarian. Usually, someone who stands besides him (such as Raizo or Kirimaru who are also librarians) had to be the 'translator' especially to those who don't meet Choji quite often. His expressions can get eerie with one big creepy smile, though his true emotions often contrast his face (such as he will smile creepily when he is hurt, and vice versa). Ironically, Shinbei's little sister Kameko found his smile to be attractive, and even had a crush on him at times.
Koheita Nanamatsu (七松 小平太, Nanamatsu Koheita)
Voiced by: Nobutoshi Canna
Koheita is a sixth-year student with much energy and happy-go-lucky, cheerful, exciting and reckless personality. He made a hobby of digging trenches on soil, sometimes using only a pair of kunai, and sometimes with his bare hands. Apart from that, he also has the tendency to spike just about anything that flies towards him to the ground, like a volleyball spike (which occasionally causes problems to others, and even broke his arm). He is easily approachable by others and treats his juniors that come forward for his help with respect, though sometimes, with reckless running. His favorite word is "Ike Ike Don Don".
Tomesaburō Kema (食満 留三郎, Kema Tomesaburō)
Voiced by: Chihiro Suzuki
A student Hagumi that has strong fighting spirit, aggressive and hot tempered, but still cares for his juniors with good tolerant. Tomesaburo and Monjiro however tend to argue which then leads them to brawl and fight each other over 'who is better' or 'who is right' matters. His appearance resembles another character in the series, Yoshiro Suzugoya, which was pointed out by Kihachiro. Tomesaburo and Isaku are classmates, and also roommates, and appears to be close.
Isaku Zenpōji (善法寺 伊作, Zenpōji Isaku)
Voiced by: Ryotaro Okiayu
A nice, friendly and caring student of 6th year Hagumi that has a personality akin to a gentle big brother to his juniors, though he is cursed with bad luck to himself, and anyone that gets tagged along with him. He is also dubbed by others and his own members - 'bad luck chairman' - and his own committee as 'bad luck committee'. As a Health Committee chairman, he takes on his job giving aid to injured or sick person responsibly and unbiased, that he also treated a Tasogaredoki ninja Zatto Konnamon, who was supposing to be an intruder. He and his committee members often gets greeted by Konnamon uninformed, sometimes with presence of other Tasogaredoki ninjas.

=== Kunoichi Class ===
Yuki (ユキ)
Voiced by: Mariko Kōda (Series 1, 9-current), Sakura Tange (Series 2-8)
She's the leader of the kunoichi trio.
Tomomi (トモミ)
Voiced by: Hiroko Emori
Tomomi is the class president and member of the kunoichi trio.
Shige (シゲ)
Voiced by: Akiko Muta
Shige is the granddaughter of the principal and member of the kunoichi trio. She's in love with Shinbe. She is an anime-only character.

=== Staff ===
Denzō Yamada (山田 伝蔵, Yamada Denzou)
Voiced by: Chikao Ōtsuka (Series 1-23), Akio Ōtsuka (Series 23-present)
Another teacher of Rantaro, he serves to teach the actual techniques and trains the lazy first graders. Denzo tends to lose his patience faster than Doi. He also shows unnatural fondness in disguising himself as a woman, usually with disastrous results. When he is dressed as a woman, his personality transforms completely too, and he refuses to answer to anything besides "Denko". He is Yamada Rikichi's father.
Hansuke Doi (土井 半助, Doi Hansuke)
Voiced by: Toshihiko Seki
Rantarō's main classroom teacher, he often loses patience with Rantaro and his classmates due to their inability to pay attention. As a runaway ninja, he was rescued by Denzo's family, and stayed with them for a while. He was then recommended by Denzo's wife to teach at the ninja school. His first students were the current sixth years. Hansuke is not his real name. Denzo helped him come up with it when he started teaching, fearing that revealing his real name will invite trouble for the school from the ninjas who are after him. His personality appears to have been the inspiration for Iruka Umino, another ninja teacher who is voiced by the same voice actor.
Headmaster (学園長, Gakuenchō)
Voiced by: Mahito Tsujimura → Jin Urayama
Ookawa Heiji Uzumasa (大川平次渦正, Ōkawa Heiji Uzumasa) who is the headmaster of the ninja school.
Hemu-Hemu (ヘムヘム)
Voiced by: Ginzō Matsuo → Bin Shimada
A dog skilled in ninjutsu, he is the longtime companion of the headmaster and is also in charge of ringing the school bell.
Shina Yamamoto (山本 シナ, Yamamoto Shina)
Voiced by: Yūko Kobayashi, Masako Katsuki (film)
The teacher of the female nintamas, she alternates between the form of a young woman and an old lady. No one is sure which is her true form.
Mess Hall Lady (食堂のおばちゃん, Shakudō no Oba-chan)
Voiced by: Seiko Tomoe
Shinzaemon Tobe (戸部 新左エ門, Tobe Shinzaemon)
Voiced by: Hirohiko Kakegawa
Shinzaemon Tobe is another teacher at the school, who occasionally appears from time to time. He's a sword instructor who is skilled, but if he doesn't have his daily meals, he loses the strength to even pick up the sword.
Natsunojō Andō (安藤 夏之丞, Andō Natsunojō)
Voiced by: Kan Tokumaru (Season 1-Season 18 episode 69), Mitsuru Ogata (Season 18 episode 83-current)
Andou is the first grade teacher for another class. He often calls Rantaro's class lazy and unproductive, comparing them to his class which seem to do nothing but study all day, thus getting good marks on their tests.
Shuusaku Komatsuda (小松田 秀作, Komatsuda Shuusaku)
Voiced by: Takumi Yamazaki
A 16-year-old working at Ninjutsu Gakuen's administration, he is longing to become a ninja, but his clumsiness prevents his from being one. He originally belongs to a fan shop family in the same town as Saitō family.

=== Tasogaredoki Castle ===
Konnamon Zatto (雑渡 昆奈門, Zatto Konnamon)
Voiced by: Masashi Hirose(season 14, 16, drama CD) Showtaro Morikubo (season 18 - current)
Zatto is Tasogaredoki ninja group's leader. Behind his bandages is a severe burn caused by a fire incident nine years ago. A genius and skillful ninja who is easy-going, and sits in a lady-like manner, he is also an acquaintance of Isaku and Fushikizou.
Sonnamon Moroizumi (諸泉 尊奈門, Moroizumi Sonnamon)
Voiced by: Bin Shimada (season 16), Tsubasa Yonaga (season 18 - current, drama CD)
A 16-year-old ninja who belongs to Tasogaredoki Castle, Zatto's underling, he is quite a strong fighter, but always has his strength losing to his youthful innocence. He was defeated by Doi Hansuke using only chalks and attendance record, and proclaims a rivalry to him not long after.
Jinnai Yamamoto (山本 陣内, Yamamoto Jinnai)
Voiced by: Bin Shimada (season 18), Motoki Takagi (season 19 episodes 34 & 36), Takuo Kawamura (season 19 - current)
Yamamoto is in command after Zatto together with Oshitsu Osaretsu. He appeared at Ninjutsu Gakuen's cultural festival, giving Fushikizou a Zatto plush.
Jinnaizaemon Kōsaka (高坂 陣内左衛門, Kousaka Jinnaizaemon)
Voiced by: Takumi Yamazaki (season 18), Hiroshi Shirokuma (season 19 episodes 31-33 & 36), Hiroaki Miura (season 19 - current)
Zatto's underling, he acts as a senior to Sonnamon. He also appeared at Ninjutsu Gakuen's cultural festival, helping out the Health Committee with their booth.
Osaretsu Oshitsu (押都 長烈, Oshitsu Osaretsu)
Voiced by: Yuichi Nakamura (Season 23 episode 23-current)
Oshitsu is in command after Zatto together with Yamamoto. His well-known feature is that he always uses a rice paper to cover his face.

=== Dokutake Castle ===
Happōsai Hieta (稗田 八方斎, Hieta Happōsai)
Voiced by: Shōzō Iizuka
Ōkinakurinokinoshita Anata (大黄奈栗野木下 穴太)
Voiced by: Masaharu Satō
Captain Tatsumaki (キャプテン達魔鬼, Kyaputen Tatsumaki)
Voiced by: Jūrōta Kosugi

Dokutama

- Shibuki
- Ibuki
- Fubuki
- Yamabuki

=== Other characters ===
Rantarō's Mother
Voiced by: Ako Mayama
Kameko Fukutomi (福富 カメ子, Fukutomi Kameko)
Voiced by: Wasabi Mizuta
Shinbei's younger sister.
Rikichi Yamada (山田 利吉, Yamada Rikichi)
Voiced by: Hiro Yūki (Season 1-2), Kōsuke Okano (Season 3-current)
Yamada-sensei's 18-year-old son, a free agent ninja. Unlike his father, he is rather handsome. His nickname is Ricky.
Dai-San-Kyōeimaru Hyōgo (兵庫 第三協栄丸, Hyōgo Dai-San-Kyōeimaru)
Voiced by: Kōzō Shioya
A bumbling and forgetful pirate captain.
Makinosuke Hanabusa (花房 牧之介, Hanabusa Makinosuke)
Voiced by: Kappei Yamaguchi
Tobe-sensei's self-proclaimed rival.

== Music ==
- Opening Themes
1. "Yūki 100%" by Hikaru Genji (eps. 1-47)
2. "Yūki 100%" by Hikaru Genji Super 5 (eps. 48-807)
3. "Yūki 100% (2002)" by Ya-Ya-Yah (eps. 808–1303)
4. "Yūki 100% (2009)" by Hey! Say! JUMP (eps. 1304–1393)
5. "Yūki 100% (2010)" by NYC (eps. 1394–1573)
6. "Yūki 100% (2012)" by Sexy Zone (eps. 1574–1883)
7. "Yūki 100% (2016)" by Junior Boys (eps. 1884–2322)
8. "Yūki 100% (2022)" by Johnny's Jr. (eps. 2323–present)
- Ending Themes
1. "Dancing Junk (ダンシング ジャンク)" by Super Monkey's (eps. 1-47)
2. "Don't Mind Namida (DON'T MIND 涙 Don't Mind the Tears)" by Hikaru Genji Super 5 (eps. 48–60)
3. "Shaking Night" by Hikaru Genji Super 5 (eps. 61–167)
4. "Shihou Happou Hijideppou" (First Generation) (四方八方肘鉄砲 （初代）(eps. 168–198)
5. "0-Ten Champion (0点チャンピオン 0 Grade Champion)" by Junich&JJr (eps. 200–264)
6. "Owara Nai School Days (終わらない SCHOOL DAYS The School Days Never End)" by Junich&JJr (eps. 265–288)
7. "Kō Shichai Rare Nai (こうしちゃいられない)" by Junich&JJr (eps. 289–368)
8. "Nin-Nin Nintama Ondo (にんにん忍たま音頭)" by SAY S (eps. 369–409)
9. "Itsu Datte (いつだってYELL Always Yell)" by Emiri Nakayama (eps. 410–499, 501–504, 506–509, 512–517, 519–522, 524–527, 529–530)
10. "Hemu-Hemu Waltz (ヘムヘムのワルツ)" by Hemu-Hemu (episode 500, 505)
11. "Tamae Kaki Uta Shinbe We no dan (たまえかきうた しんべヱの段)" by Yuko Bracken (episodes 510, 518, 523, and 528)
12. "Memory and Melody" by SPLASH (eps. 531–566)
13. "Ai ga Ichiban (愛がいちばん Love's Best)" by Sayuri Ishikawa (eps. 567–647)
14. "Shihou Happou Hijideppou (Second Generation) (四方八方肘鉄砲 （2代目）)" by Mayumi Hunaki (eps. 648–807)
15. "Sekai ga Hitotsu ni Naru Made (世界がひとつになるまで Until the World is One)" by Ya-Ya-Yah (eps. 808–967)
16. "Kaze (風 The Wind)" by Aya Ueto (eps. 968–1047)
17. "Oh!ENKA (桜援歌 (OH!ENKA)" by Kanjani8 (eps. 1048–1153)
18. "Ai ni Mukatte (愛に向かって)" by Kanjani8 (eps. 1154–1303)
19. "Yume Iro (夢色 Dream Color)" by Hey! Say! JUMP (eps. 1304–1393)
20. "Yume no Tane (ゆめのタネ)" by NYC (eps. 1394–1573)
21. "Kaze wo Kitte (風をきって)" by Sexy Zone (eps. 1574–1738)
22. "Matta Nante na Shi! (待ったなんてなしっ!)" by Sexy Zone (eps. 1,739–1,883)
23. "3-byou Waratte (3秒笑って)" by Junior Boys (eps. 1884–2017)
24. "Yancha na Hero (やんちゃなヒーロー)" by Hey! Say! 7 (eps. 2018–2169)
25. "Imada!! (いまだ!!)" by WEST. (eps. 2170–2322)
26. "Kono Aozora wa Wasurenai (この青空は忘れない)" by Johnny's Jr. (eps. 2323–present)

== Episodes ==
A total of 34 series have been broadcast with each season containing a different number of episodes (ranging from 47 in series one to 120 in series two, three and four). Every episode title ends with the phrase no dan (の段 "The step of"). In 2012, special episodes were broadcast to mark the show's 20th anniversary as well as the 15th anniversary of Ojarumaru, the show broadcast in the slot before Nintama Rantarō. This trend continued in 2017 and 2022, with the broadcast of special episodes to mark the show's 25th and 30th anniversary respectively. Currently, a total of 2550 episodes have been broadcast as of January 2025 (excluding specials). There was also a series of specials titled Nintama Rantarō no Uchū Daibōken with Cosmic Front NEXT (忍たま乱太郎の宇宙大冒険 with コズミックフロント☆NEXT), and two of them had English-dubbed versions produced by William Winckler Productions that have not been released.

== Films ==
A total of five films based on the series have been released in Japan. The first film, Nintama Rantarō the Movie (映画 忍たま乱太郎 Eiga Nintama Rantarō), was released by Shochiku on June 29, 1996. The second film, Gekijō-ban Anime Nintama Rantarō Ninjutsu Gakuen Zenin Shutsudō! no Dan (劇場版アニメ 忍たま乱太郎 忍術学園 全員出動！の段), was released by Warner Bros. Japan on March 12, 2011.

In July 2011, a live action film version directed by Takashi Miike titled Ninja Kids!!! was released. The rights to produce an American version of the film were in negotiations in 2011. A sequel was released on July 6, 2013, called Ninja Kids!!! Summer Mission Impossible! (忍たま乱太郎 夏休み宿題大作戦! の段, Nintama Rantarô Natsuyasumi Shukudai Daisakusen! no Dan).

A new anime film titled Nintama Rantarō: Invincible Master of the Dokutake Ninja (劇場版 忍たま乱太郎 ドクタケ忍者隊最強の軍師 Gekijōban Nintama Rantaro Dokutake Ninjatai Saikyō no Gunshi), based on Kazuhisa Sakaguchi's 2013 novel of the same name, was released to Japanese theaters by Shochiku on December 20, 2024. The film is directed by Masaya Fujimori at Ajia-do Animation Works, with Sakaguchi writing the screenplay. Shochiku held English-subtitled screenings at Shinjuku Piccadilly, Namba Parks Cinema, and MOVIX Kyoto during March 7–13, 2025. Encore Films released the film to theaters across Asia throughout spring and summer 2025, with English subtitles available. It became available on Amazon Prime Video in 180 countries on August 12, 2025.

== Video games ==
Various video games were released, starting in 1995. Most of them were published by Culture Brain.

== Broadcast ==
The anime series premiered on NHK G on April 10, 1993, and aired in a weekly 30-minute timeslot until March 19, 1994. Since October 3, 1994, the series airs daily on NHK E in a 10-minute timeslot.
