= Yuma Nakayama w/B.I.Shadow =

Japanese musical group

- Genres: J-pop
- Years active: 2009–2011
- Label: Johnny's Entertainment
- Members: Yuma Nakayama; Kento Nakajima; Fuma Kikuchi; Hokuto Matsumura; Yugo Kochi
- Past members: Misaki Takahata

Yuma Nakayama w/B.I.Shadow (中山優馬 w/ B.I.Shadow, Nakayama Yūma wizu Bī Ai Shadō) is a J-pop group under Johnny & Associates, made up of five members.

== History ==
=== B.I.Shadow ===
In 2008 B.I.Shadow was formed as a Johnny's Jr. group. At that time the members were: Kento Nakajima, Fuma Kikuchi, and Misaki Takahata. During that year, they acted in the drama Scrap Teacher. In March 2009, Hokuto Matsumura joined the group during a Hey! Say! 7 concert. On May 27, 2009, Takahata suddenly quit Johnny's, because of his studies. Later in the same year Yugo Kochi joined Johnny's and was put in the group shortly after his audition. On June 4, 2009, it was announced B.I.Shadow would debut with Yuma Nakayama as Yuma Nakayama w/B.I.Shadow.

=== Nakayama Yuma w/ B.I.Shadow and NYC Boys ===
The collaborative group with members from both Kansai (Nakayama) and Kanto (Nakajima, Kikuchi, Kochi and Matsumura) Johnny's Jr., was created on June 3, 2009, their average age was 14.6 (14.4 on other sites), making it the youngest group to debut, taking the spot from Mini-Moni, whose average age was 14.8 at debut. Four days later, on June 7, Ryosuke Yamada and Yuri Chinen of Hey! Say! JUMP joined to form the temporary group NYC Boys. Nakayama Yuma w/ B.I.Shadow's debut single "Akuma na Koi/NYC", released on July 15, 2009, opened in first place, almost one and a half years after Hey! Say! JUMP's debut album did the same. "Akuma na Koi", Nakayama Yuma w/ B.I.Shadow's song, was used as theme song for "Koi shite Akuma ~ Vampire Boy ~", Nakayama's drama, while "NYC" was the image song for the Women's Volleyball World Grand Prix 2009, performed by the NYC boys.

== Members ==
=== Current members ===
- Yuma Nakayama

B.I.Shadow

- Kento Nakajima - He was born on March 13, 1994, in Tokyo, Japan. He acted with Fuma Kikuchi and Misaki Takahata in Scrap Teacher and in the Japanese Drama Koishite Akuma with main character and band member Yuma Nakayama.
- Kikuchi Fuma - He was born on March 7, 1995, in Tokyo, Japan. He is, along with Kento Nakajima, one of the original B.I.Shadow members. He also played alongside Kento Nakajima and former B.I.Shadow member Misaki Takahata in the Japanese drama Scrap Teacher.
- Hokuto Matsumura - He was born June 18, 1995, in Shizuoka Prefecture, Japan. He is the newest member of B.I.Shadow and also the youngest member. His reason for applying to Johnny's was because he was a fan and admirer of NEWS. He is skilled in Karate and has practiced it since his first year of elementary school. He holds a black belt.
- Yugo Kochi - He was born March 8, 1994, in Kanagawa Prefecture, Japan. He is also one of the newer members of B.I.Shadow and is the oldest. When first starting out in Johnny's, he was only a Johnny's Junior for one month before becoming a full-time member of B.I.Shadow.

=== Past members of B.I.Shadow ===
- Misaki Takahata (left Johnny's in 2009)

== Singles ==
- Akuma na Koi/NYC #1 . 1st week sales - 175,788 . Total sales - 275,439 . RIAJ Certification - Platinum
