= Chapter 1 (Yuma Nakayama album) =

- Limited Edition cover

Studio album by Yuma Nakayama
- Released: November 26, 2014 (JP)
- Recorded: 2009–2014
- Genre: J-pop
- Label: Johnny's Entertainment

Singles from Chapter 1
- 1. "Akuma na Koi/NYC" Released: July 15, 2009; 2. "Missing Piece" Released: October 31, 2012; 3. "High Five" Released: April 2, 2014; 4. "Get Up!" Released: September 10, 2014

Alternative cover
- Regular Edition cover

Chapter 1 is the first solo album of Japanese idol Yuma Nakayama.

Chapter 1 is released in Japan on 26 November 2014 by Johnnys Entertainment. There are two versions the Limited Edition and the Regular Edition. This album also has an event ID for Nakayama Yuma's Special Event in 2015 (together with the event IDs in Get Up! single).

== Track listing ==
- Limited Edition 1 – Single (CD+DVD)

CD

1. High Five
2. Kōsaten
3. XOXO (キスハグ Kiss Hug)
4. Missing Piece
5. Mai, Koi (Dance, Love)
6. Iolite
7. Bokutachi no birthday
8. Get Up!
9. Akuma na Koi (Album Ver.)
10. In The Name of Love

DVD

1. 50 minute video has been decided short film「Kōsaten」 & Making

①Booklet
②DVD
③Nakayama Yuma Special Event ID

- Regular Edition (CD)
1. High Five
2. Kōsaten
3. XOXO (Kiss Hug [Kisuhagu])
4. Missing Piece
5. Mai, Koi (Dance, Love)
6. Iolite
7. Bokutachi no birthday
8. Oyasumi
9. Hustler
10. Get Up!
11. Akuma na Koi (Album Ver.)
12. Kiseki, Mitsuke ni (Miracle, to discover)
13. In The Name of Love

①Booklet ②Nakayama Yuma Special Event ID (First Press)

== Charts and certifications ==
Number	Release date	Title	Rank	Sales	Certification
1	November 26, 2014	"Chapter 1"	x	x	x
