= Ai-Girls =

Japanese idol group

Ai-Girls アイガールズ
- Origin: Yonezawa, Yamagata, Japan
- Genres: Pop
- Years active: 2012–present
- Members: Hii-Nyan, Yuuka-rin, Yuka-nyaro, Namii, NAO, RUKA, Shio-rin, Mocchi, AYU, Reina-pon, Alice, Kiyoka, Kirara, RIN, Haa-chan, Nagi, Ami-rin, Hiyo-rin, Koh-tan
- Website: ai-girls.jp

Ai-Girls (アイガールズ) is a Japanese 19-member idol group in Yonezawa City, Yamagata Prefecture. It is the official local idol group, sponsored by KMA Popular Friends, Yonezawa City, and the Board of Education of Yonezawa City.

== Description ==
The twenty who were chosen by audition that took place in October 2012, it was formed as a social contribution idle unit of Yonezawa departure. It was a full-scale stage debut appeared in 19 people in Yonezawa Uesugi Festival opening festival held at the stage of Denkokuno-Mori of Yonezawa City on April 29, 2013. Started volunteering events and appearances in the province outside the center Yonezawa city as a "social contribution idle unit to deliver energy and love across the country from Yonezawa". The serve the general producer is also performed dance music guidance and voluntarily provided by musical artists Kato Machaaki of Takahata, Yamagata Prefecture town resident.

== Group name ==
Tentative name of the ACB48 Yonezawa was given at the time of the audition from the initial apple(TATEYAMA apple) Yonezawa specialty, carp(Yonezawa carp), of beef(Yonezawa beef). Name from it is the general public after the audition, it was the theme of "Love(愛:Ai) and righteousness(義:Gi)" of the military commander-Naoe Kanetsugu laid the foundation of Yonezawa, and Ai-Girls was adopted. Thought of as "I want to support the group in the heart full of love" and thought of as "want to grow up to a group, such as those delivering love" is put love local Yonezawa.

== Details ==
In the wake of the feeling that "I want to continue to spread to teenagers the circle of social contribution", was proposed by Yonezawa in the "citizen proposal cooperative model project" Shiokawa Tomoko representative of KMA poplar Friends is a youth healthy development organizations Yonezawa "ACB48 Yonezawa (tentative name) development Project "was adopted in fiscal year 2012.

"Training of junior leaders who can contribute to the community, programs that can contribute to the healthy development of youth" as, Web pages, and publicity of the city In addition to the KMA poplar Friends, Board of Education Yonezawa City and Yonezawa City have link the name to the organizers adjust PR activities in, ensure the practice location, and offer activities place, I do a backup in terms of the burden of cost. In addition, Yonezawa textile is used for part of the costume, cooperative participation of citizens are going to provide the dough Yonezawa textile industry union youth plays a central role, local high school students and in charge of costume design.

== Members ==
| Name | Nickname | Birthdate | Age | Generation | Birthplace | Note |
|---|---|---|---|---|---|---|
| Hitomi | Hii-Nyan (ひーにゃん) | March 5, 1990 | 35 | 1 | Yonezawa City | |
| Yuuka | Yuuka-rin (ゆうかりん) | July 30, 1994 | 31 | 1 | Yonezawa City | |
| Yuka | Yuka-nyaro (ゆかにゃろ) | March 6, 1996 | 29 | 1 | Yonezawa City | Leader |
| Shiori(S) | Namii (奈海ぃ) | September 28, 1996 | 28 | 1 | Yamagata City | |
| Naoko | Nao (NAO) | December 12, 1996 | 28 | 1 | Yamagata City | |
| Kaoru | Ruka (RUKA) | August 17, 1997 | 27 | 1 | Yonezawa City | |
| Shiori(R) | Shio-rin (しおりん) | April 1, 1998 | 27 | 1 | Iide town | |
| Karin | Mocchi (もっちぃ) | April 1, 1998 | 27 | 1 | Nanyou City | |
| Ayumi | Ayu (AYU) | January 20, 1999 | 26 | 1 | Yonezawa City | |
| Reina | Reina-pon (れーなぽん) | March 16, 1999 | 26 | 1 | Yonezawa City | |
| Arisu | Alice (アリス) | September 17, 1999 | 25 | 1 | Yonezawa City | |
| Kiyoka | Kiyoka (きよか) | March 5, 2000 | 25 | 1 | Yamagata City | |
| Kirara | Kirara (キララ) | April 24, 2000 | 25 | 1 | Yonezawa City | |
| Rin | Rin (RIN) | June 10, 2000 | 25 | 1 | Yonezawa City | |
| Hana | Haa-chan (はぁちゃん) | December 27, 2000 | 24 | 1 | Yonezawa City | |
| Haruka | Nagi (ナギ) | February 4, 2001 | 24 | 1 | Yonezawa City | |
| Ami | Ami-rin (あみりん) | March 29, 2001 | 24 | 1 | Yonezawa City | |
| Hiyori | Hiyo-rin (ひよりん) | August 7, 2002 | 23 | 1 | Yonezawa City | |
| Koharu | Koh-tan (こーたん) | February 8, 2003 | 22 | 1 | Yonezawa City | |

== Discography ==
=== Singles ===
| # | Title | Release date | Note |
|---|---|---|---|
| 1 | "Colorful Time" (カラフルTime) | July 28, 2013 | - |

== See also ==
- SPLASH (Japan Idol Group)
