= Sword of the Stranger =

2007 Japanese animated film by Masahiro Andō

- Theatrical release poster

Japanese name
- Kanji: ストレンヂア 無皇刃譚
Transcriptions
- Revised Hepburn: Sutorenjia Mukōhadan
- Directed by: Masahiro Andō
- Written by: Fumihiko Takayama
- Produced by: Masahiko Minami
- Starring: Tomoya Nagase; Yuri Chinen
- Cinematography: Yohei Miyahara
- Edited by: Hiroaki Itabe
- Music by: Naoki Satō
- Production company: Bones
- Distributed by: Shochiku
- Release date: September 29, 2007
- Running time: 102 minutes
- Country: Japan
- Languages: Japanese; Mandarin

Sword of the Stranger (Japanese: ストレンヂア 無皇刃譚, Hepburn: Sutorenjia Mukōhadan) is a 2007 Japanese animated jidaigeki-chanbara adventure film produced by Bones and released by Shochiku. It depicts Kotaro, a young orphan hunted by Ming swordsmen, who receives unexpected protection from Nanashi, a troubled Rōnin.

The film was commissioned in 2005, directed by Masahiro Andō and written by Fumihiko Takayama. It features the voices of Tomoya Nagase and Yuri Chinen, with animation direction by Megumi Endô, character design by Atsushi Morikawa, and its orchestral score composed by Naoki Satō.

Sword of the Stranger was theatrically released in Japan on September 29, 2007, and began a limited release in the United States on February 5, 2008. It received positive critical reception, with praise for the animation, action sequences, and music. It was nominated for Best Animated Feature Film at the 2008 Asia Pacific Screen Awards and was Japan's submission for Best Animated Feature at the 81st Academy Awards.

== Plot ==
The story begins during the Sengoku period (Note: See also Tributary system of China – Japan) with a young boy named Kotaro, who escapes unknown pursuers with his dog Tobimaru, and is directed by the monk Shouan to seek help from Master Zekkai at the Mangaku Temple in the Akaike Province. Meanwhile, a group of Ming Chinese warriors under the command of the elderly master Bai-Luan is being escorted by soldiers of Lord Akaike who has agreed to allow the Ming to build a large altar on his land in exchange for gold. The group is ambushed by bandits, but they are slaughtered by the Ming's expert Western swordsman, Luo-Lang.

While sheltering in an abandoned temple, Kotaro encounters Nanashi, a wandering swordsman, but they are found by a search party of two Ming warriors with Akaike soldiers. A Ming warrior attacks the duo, and Nanashi kills him, but Tobimaru is wounded by a poisonous dagger. Kotaro hires Nanashi as a bodyguard and he takes Tobimaru to a doctor where the dog is treated. Meanwhile, Akaike soldiers capture the second Ming, Tu-Si, who is tortured to divulge the purpose of the altar. Tu-Si reveals that they are on a mission from the Ming Emperor to create an elixir of immortality known as the Xian Medicine. The essential ingredient is the blood of a prophesied child, the boy Kotaro, who can only be sacrificed at a certain time of the year. Lord Akaike then changes his plans to capture Kotaro and hold him for a high ransom.

Meanwhile, Nanashi reveals a few details about his past to Kotaro; that he fought for different masters but knows nothing of his origins except that he is a shipwreck survivor with red hair, and dyes it black to enable him to blend in with the Japanese population. Nanashi leaves Kotaro in the care of Shoaun and the monks at the Mangaku Temples, however the monks turn Kotaro over to the Ming to save their own lives. When the Akaike arrive and attempt to take the boy, Nanashi realizes that something is wrong and returns. The Ming warriors have already left with Kotaro so Tobimaru leads Nanashi as the dog tracks Kotaro and his captors.

When Bai-Luan learns of Lord Akaike's betrayal, the Ming capture him and use him as a human shield at the fortress containing the altar to await the prophesied time. Itadori, an ambitious Akaike general, leads a small battalion of soldiers to rescue Lord Akaike. However, Itadori decides to kill Akaike and seizes the opportunity to take command. The troops now attack the fortress, but in the ensuing bloody battle, most of the Ming and Akaike soldiers are killed, including Itadori.

Nanashi finally arrives at the fortress, but is momentarily knocked unconscious. He recalls the incident years earlier when he was ordered to execute two children and he vowed to never unsheathe his sword. When Nanashi recovers and sees Kotaro about to be sacrificed, he draws his sword and fights his way to the altar, saving Kotaro. Bai-Luan attempts to shoot Nanashi, but Luo-Lang kills his master so that he can challenge Nanashi to a final duel. The two swordsmen engage in a tremendous sword fight, destroying the structure in the process. Despite suffering many injuries, Nanashi finally defeats Luo-Lang who slowly dies, somewhat shocked by his defeat. The next morning, Kotaro rides off on horseback carrying Tobimaru and the badly wounded and barely conscious Nanashi, talking about starting a new life together.

== Characters ==
Nanashi (名無し; 'No Name')
Voiced by: Tomoya Nagase (Japanese); Michael Adamthwaite (English)
A ronin who has no name and is haunted by his terrible past. He has served under different warlords and after committing atrocities under their commands, he has sworn to keep his sword sheathed. He has red hair and dyes his hair black to avoid being recognized as a foreigner. Nanashi knows nothing of his origins other than that he was the only survivor of a sinking ship. After meeting the young Kotaro and his dog Tobimaru, Nanashi decides to act as the boy's bodyguard. This leads to his prolonged struggle against the Ming warriors, particularly the Western swordsman Luo-Lang.
Kotaro (仔太郎)
Voiced by: Yuri Chinen (Japanese); Aidan Drummond (English)
Kotaro is a young orphan with his traveling companion Tobimaru, the Shiba Inu dog. He is pursued by Ming swordsmen as well as the soldiers of Akaike because he is suspected of being the prophesied child whose blood is required by the Ming to create an eternal elixir. He "hires" Nanashi to protect him after the ronin saves him from an attack in an abandoned temple.
Luo-Lang (羅狼)
Voiced by: Koichi Yamadera (Japanese); Scott McNeil (English)
A Western blonde-haired, blue-eyed warrior, second-in-command of the Ming group under Master Bai-Luan and an extremely skilled swordsman. Calculating and ruthless, Luo-Lang is driven by the thrill of the fight and lives for the moment where he can clash swords with a worthy opponent. He fights with Nanashi because of the challenge rather than to complete the mission of his master Bai-Luan.
Tobimaru (飛丸)
Kotaro's dog and companion. Tobimaru is poisoned by a Ming warrior and curing him provides the catalyst for Nanashi and Kotaro to work together. After Kotaro is captured by Luo-Lang, Tobimaru helps Nanashi find and save the boy before he can be sacrificed.
Lord Akaike (領主)
Voiced by: Unshō Ishizuka (Japanese); Paul Dobson (English)
A greedy Japanese lord who agrees to help Bai-Luan with his project, but then tries to betray and exploit him.
Shogen Itadori (虎杖 将藍)
Voiced by: Akio Otsuka (Japanese); Brian Dobson (English)
One of the chief vassals of Lord Akaike. He is a warrior whose swordsmanship skills have helped him rise above the rank-and-file soldiers and into power. He is driven by the ambition of one day becoming the ruler of an independent territory.
Juurouta Inui (戌 重郎太)
Voiced by: Mamoru Miyano (Japanese); Alistair Abell (English)
He is a skilled archer under the command of Shogen Itadori and hopes one day to marry the princess Akaike.
Shouan (祥庵)
Voiced by: Naoto Takenaka (Japanese); Hiro Kanagawa (English)
The monk who helps Kotaro and Tobimaru escape from their pursuers at the beginning of the film. After they reunite, however, he immediately betrays Kotaro and sells him out to the Ming group.
Master Bai-Luan (白鸞)
Voiced by: Atsushi Ii (Japanese); Ken Kramer (English)
The leader of the Ming group. He is responsible for chasing Kotaro to Japan on the Emperor's order to create an elixir for everlasting life. He is completely dedicated to the Emperor and sees Luo-Lang and the other warriors as mere tools to achieve his mission.

== Release ==
Sword of the Stranger was released to Japanese theaters on September 29, 2007. The DVD and Blu-ray were released in regular and limited editions on April 11, 2008. The film premiered in the United States on February 5, 2008. It was dubbed into English by Ocean Productions released by Bandai Entertainment. The English-dub was released on DVD and Blu-ray on June 16, 2009. At Otakon 2016, Funimation announced at their panel that they picked up the rights for the movie, and that it was going to be released on a DVD and Blu-ray Disc combo pack on November 8, 2016.

== Reception ==
Sword of the Stranger appeared on a select number of cinema screens in the United States and reception was positive.

Anime News Network reviewer Justin Sevakis gave the film an overall A− and labeled it as: "Breath-taking action scenes wrapped around a compelling story that actually makes sense". In her Anime News Network column entitled Shelf Life, reviewer Bamboo Dong profiled the Blu-ray release as "a gorgeously animated, blood-soaked samurai romp that entertains for its full 102 minute run". /Film described Sword of the Stranger as "Lone Wolf and Cub meets Rurouni Kenshin" and said it is "perfect for fans of Samurai movies, Wuxia, and animation".

The film was also positively received on its festival run in the European Union, receiving a rating of 4.07 out of 5 from viewers on average from Camera Japan and being well received at Oktoberfest, Sci-Fi London's anime all-nighter. The film has been ranked at #1 in JapanCinema.net's "Top 10 Anime Films of the Decade" list.

Sword of the Stranger has appeared at many international film festivals. The list of film festivals that the film has appeared at includes:

- 24th Amsterdam Fantastic Film Festival
- AnimagiC
- Asia Filmfest
- Asia Pacific Screen Awards
- Camera Japan
- Fantaspoa (International Fantastic Film Festival of Porto Alegre)
- Leeds International Film Festival
- London Barbican's Japanimation
- Sci-Fi London Oktoberfest

The film won the award for Best Animated Feature at FANTASPOA (International Fantastic Film Festival of Porto Alegre) in Brazil and was a nominee for Best Animated Feature Film at the Asia Pacific Screen Awards

The film was also submitted to the Academy of Motion Picture Arts and Sciences for consideration as a nominee for Best Animated Feature at the 81st Academy Awards. There were fourteen films vying for the three nomination spots, including Sword of the Stranger.
