= Sprout (TV series) =

- Genre: Drama
- Based on: Sprout by Atsuko Namba
- Written by: Yūko Matsuda
- Directed by: Kentarō Moriya
- Starring: Yuri Chinen; Aoi Morikawa
- Opening theme: "Hana Egao" by Hey! Say! 7
- Country of origin: Japan
- Original language: Japanese
- No. of series: 1
- No. of episodes: 12

Production
- Producers: Harukazu Morizane; Hiroyuki Ueno
- Running time: 30 minutes
- Production company: Nippon Television

Original release
- Network: Nippon Television
- Release: July 7 – September 29, 2012

Sprout (スプラウト) (Supurauto) is a 2012 Japanese television drama series. It was based on the manga of the same name by Atsuko Nanba, and serialized in Bessatsu Friend from 2005 to 2008. Yuri Chinen, who is a member of Hey! Say! JUMP, played the lead role. It premiered on NTV from July 7 to September 29 every Saturday night.

== Cast ==
- Yuri Chinen as Sōhei Narahashi
- Aoi Morikawa as Miku Ikenouchi
- Fujiko Kojima as Miyuki Ozawa
- Jesse (credited as Lewis Jesse) as Hayato Katagiri
- Ryosuke Hashimoto as Naoharu Takigawa
- Mayuko Kawakita as Kiyoka Taniyama
- You Kikkawa as Haruka Hayase
- Shintaro Yamada as Seiji Okunuki

Preceded by Shiritsu Bakaleya Koukou (April 14, 2012 - June 30, 2012)	NTV; Saturdays 24:50 - 25:20 (JST)	Succeeded by Piece – Kanojo no Kioku (October 6, 2012 - December 29, 2012)
