= Flowers Will Bloom =

Single by Hana wa saku project
- Released: May 23, 2012
- Genre: J-pop
- Label: FlyingDog
- Songwriters: Shunji Iwai (lyrics); Yoko Kanno (composition and arrangement)
- Producer: Mayumi Koda

"Flowers Will Bloom" (Japanese: 花は咲く Hana wa Saku) is a Japanese charity song released in 2012.

== Overview ==
The song was produced mainly by the Japan Broadcasting Corporation (NHK) as a support song for the reconstruction efforts following the 2011 Tohoku earthquake.

NHK has been broadcasting "Flowers Will Bloom" since March 2012. Since then, various versions have been produced. It has been sung and passed down by many people across generations and borders.

The lyricist of the song, Shunji Iwai, and the composer, Yoko Kanno, are both from Sendai, Miyagi. Also, the song features notable natives from the affected areas of Miyagi, Fukushima and Iwate.

In 2014, Yuzuru Hanyu, a figure skater from Sendai, performed to Hana Ha Saku "Flowers Will Bloom" to the world. The version of the song chosen by Hanyu was sung by Fumiya Sashida. And also, The song was sung at the Kōhaku Uta Gassen for four consecutive years (63rd, 64th, 65th, 66th).
