= Yume Tamago =

Single by NYC
- Released: (Japan) March 9, 2011
- Recorded: 2011
- Genre: J-pop
- Label: Johnny's Entertainment

NYC singles chronology
"Yoku Asobi Yoku Manabe" (2010)	"Yume Tamago" (2011)	"Wonderful Cupid/Glass no Mahō" (2012)

Alternative Covers
- "Yume Tamago" Limited A

Alternative cover
- "Yume Tamago" Limited B

"Yume Tamago" (ユメタマゴ) is the third released single by the J-pop group NYC. It was released on March 9, 2011, two days before the 2011 Tōhoku earthquake and tsunami. The single was certified Gold by Recording Industry Association of Japan.

== Single information ==
It was released in three versions: a Limited CD+DVD A Edition, a Limited CD+DVD B Edition, and a Regular CD only Edition. The title song was used as the ending theme of anime film “Nintama Rantaro Ninjutsu Gakuen Zenin Shutsudou no Dan“.

Limited A includes the promotional video of the song while the Limited B includes the PV of their first single Yūki 100%. The Regular edition contains three tracks including Yume Tamago and their original Karaokes.

== Track listing ==
=== Limited Edition A ===
CD

1. Yume Tamago
2. Yume Tamago (Original Karaoke)

DVD

1. Yume Tamago (PV)
2. Yume Tamago PV Making

=== Limited Edition B ===
CD

1. Yume Tamago
2. Yume Tamago (Original Karaoke)

DVD

1. Yuuki 100% (PV)
2. Yuuki 100% PV Making

=== Regular Edition ===
CD

1. Yume Tamago
2. Kimi to Itsumo
3. Seishun Kippu
4. Yume Tamago (Original Karaoke)
5. Kimi to Itsumo (Original Karaoke)
6. Seishun Kippu (Original Karaoke)

== Charts ==
Chart (2011)	Peak position
Japan Oricon Daily Singles Chart	1
Japan Oricon Weekly Singles Chart	2
Japan OriconMonthly Singles Chart	4

== Sales and certifications ==
Country	Provider	Sales	Certification
Japan	RIAJ	148,218	Gold by Recording Industry Association of Japan

== Release history ==
Region	Date	Format	Distributor
Japan	March 9, 2011	CD single (JECN-0262); CD+DVD (JECN-0258); CD+DVD (JECN-0260)	J Storm
Hong Kong	April 9, 2011	CD single	Avex Asia
