= Yoku Asobi Yoku Manabe =

Single by NYC
- B-side: Another World ~ Mirai no bokura e~ (アナザーワールド〜未来の僕らへ〜); Jyugatsu no Ameshizuku (十月の雨シズク) (Regular Edition)
- Released: (Japan) October 20, 2010
- Recorded: 2010
- Genre: J-pop
- Label: Johnny's Entertainment

NYC singles chronology
"Yūki 100%" (2010)	"Yoku Asobi Yoku Manabe" (2010)	"Yume Tamago" (2011)

"Yoku Asobi Yoku Manabe" (よく遊びよく学べ) is the second released single by the J-pop group NYC.

== Track listing ==
Regular Edition CD
No.	Title	Length
1.	"Yoku Asobi Yoku Manabe" (よく遊びよく学べ)	3:49
2.	"Another World ~ Mirai no bokura e~" (アナザーワールド〜未来の僕らへ〜～)	3:55
3.	"Jyugatsu no Ameshizuku" (十月の雨シズク)	4:54
4.	"Yoku Asobi Yoku Manabe (Original Karaoke)" (よく遊びよく学べ（オリジナル・カラオケ）)	3:49
5.	"Another World ~ Mirai no bokura e~ (Original Karaoke)" (アナザーワールド〜未来の僕らへ〜～（オリジナル・カラオケ）)	3:55
6.	"Jyugatsu no Ameshizuku (Original Karaoke)" (十月の雨シズク)	4:55
Total length:		25:16

Limited Edition CD
No.	Title	Lyrics	Length
1.	"Yoku Asobi Yoku Manabe" (よく遊びよく学べ)		3:49
2.	"Another World ~ Mirai no bokura e~"	アナザーワールド〜未来の僕らへ〜	3:55
Total length:			7:44

Limited Edition DVD
No.	Title	Length
1.	"Yoku Asobi Yoku Manabe (Music Clip&Jacket Shooting)" (「よく遊びよく学べ」(ﾐｭｰｼﾞｯｸ･ｸﾘｯﾌﾟ＆ｼﾞｬｹｯﾄ撮影))
Total length:		APPROX. 13mins.

== Charts ==
Chart (2011)	Peak position
Japan Oricon Weekly Singles Chart	1
Japan Oricon October 2010 Monthly Singles Chart	5
Japan Oricon 2010 Yearly Singles Chart	60
