= Splash (Japanese band) =

Japanese pop group

SPLASH スプラッシュ
- Origin: Japan
- Genres: J-pop
- Years active: 2006–2019
- Labels: Resound Music; Airy Opus Records
- Members: Ami Takahashi; Sayaka; Kotomi Yamazaki; Maki Hayasaka; Kirara Hashimoto; Moka Nakagawa
- Past members: See past members section
- Website: http://splash.da-te.jp/

SPLASH (スプラッシュ) is a dance and vocal girl group created by MORADO COMPANY. Consisting of girls of elementary and junior high school students in Japan. It is used as the activity aimed at community interaction and contribution to the slogan "Tohoku sources unit".

== History ==
It was formed in March 2006. The CD debut on May 5, 2007. Other local television appearances, each member also performs work CM, drama, such as model events and appearances around the country. Members have a clean-up activities around my studio in lessons before.

SPLASH raised big awareness in Miyagi Prefecture, appeared in the 40th anniversary of CM "Miyagi TV" started broadcasting in 2010. Was working as a main character named "SPLASH Week" is viewership week of spring, who played co-sponsored game of the Tohoku Rakuten Golden Eagles, which was held in Kleenex Stadium Miyagi as "Miyatele support team (ミヤテレ応援隊)" continue "Miyateleday (ミヤテレデー)" etc. in 2011.

The activity and renewal as "Tohoku sources unit SPLASH2012" the unit name from May 2012. In some cases to carry out activities in the organization provisional plus four members of JEWEL from June 2013. In "economic development projects in the area ”Nationwide campaign Amachan map! You" in conjunction TV series of NHK as "Amachan (あまちゃん)" in August, and was elected to the PR Miyagi Prefecture "local supporters" from August 2013.

== Member ==
Name	Real name	Birthdate	Age	Join date	Notes
AMI	Ami Takahashi (高橋 亜実)	July 23, 1998	27	May 25, 2011	Leader
SAYAKA	Sayaka (紗也歌)	March 19, 1998	28	May 4, 2012	Sub Leader
KOTOMI	Kotomi Yamazaki (山﨑 琴美)	December 22, 1999	26	May 25, 2011	
MAKI	Maki Hayasaka (早坂 真紀)	February 23, 2000	26	May 25, 2011	
KIRARA	Kirara Hashimoto (橋本 きらら)	April 10, 2000	26	May 25, 2011	
MOKA	Moka Nakgawa (中川 萌香)	February 26, 2001	25	May 4, 2012	Nico-petit Nicola (magazine)#Nico-petit Model、JEWEL Leader

=== Past members ===
Name	Real name	Birthdate	Age	Join date	secession date	Note
RISA	Risa (りさ)	-	-	March 2006	August 27, 2006	First member
NATSUKI	Natsuki Suzuki (鈴木 菜月)	June 3, 1993	33	March 2006	April 2007	First member
KANA	Kanako Sawada (澤田 加奈子)	June 16, 1992	34	March 2006	August 31, 2007	First Leader
SAYUKI	Sayuki Inaba (稲葉 沙侑)	-	-	March 2006	August 31, 2007	First member
SONO	Sonoko Sawada (澤田 園子)	August 8, 1994	31	March 2006	August 31, 2007	First member
MAYU	Mayu Takahashi (高橋 真悠)	December 8, 1994	31	March 2006	March 28, 2009	First member
RIKA	Rika Yashima (八島 莉香)	December 6, 1995	30	March 2006	April 18, 2009	First member Based on techpri Leader
YUKINO	Yukino Satou (佐藤 友紀乃)	December 19, 1994	31	March 2006	April 18, 2009	First member Iris (by MORADOLL) current members through the techpri
NATSUKI	Natsuki Kojima (兒島 菜月)	February 19, 1996	30	May 15, 2008	April 18, 2009	Based on techpri members
MOMOKA	Momoka Yonekura (米倉 桃華)	August 28, 1995	30	May 15, 2008	April 18, 2009	Iris (by MORADOLL) current members through the techpri
RIO	Rio Sugawara (菅原 梨央)	June 26, 1995	30	May 15, 2008	April 18, 2009	Iris (by MORADOLL) current members through the techpri
MAKI	Maki Sasaki (佐々木 麻妃)	November 6, 1995	30	September 14, 2007	March 31, 2010	
RINA	Rina Yamato (大和 里菜)	December 14, 1994	31	September 14, 2007	March 31, 2010	Nogizaka46 current member
MA-YA	Maya Nakagawa (中川 茉綾)	October 10, 1995	30	May 15, 2008	May 1, 2011	
NANA	Natsuki Satou (佐藤 菜月)	September 15, 1995	30	June 22, 2008	May 1, 2011	
KANA	Kana Minegishi (嶺岸 加奈)	October 25, 1995	30	May 15, 2008	May 1, 2011	
NAOKO	Naoko Matsuda (松田 直子)	December 12, 1996	29	April 15, 2010	May 1, 2011	Ai-Girls current member
SABINA	Sabina Sasaki (佐々木 サビナ)	December 30, 1999	26	April 15, 2010	May 1, 2011	The return as a new member in May 2012. And leave again on August 31, 2012.
MARI	Rina Satou (佐藤 莉奈)	August 14, 1996	29	April 13, 2009	March 31, 2012	
RIKAKO	Rikako Yumoto (湯本 理華子)	March 11, 1998	28	April 13, 2009	March 31, 2012	
JURIA	Juria Itou (伊東 ジュリア)	January 27, 1999	27	April 15, 2010	March 31, 2012	

=== SPLASH Jr. ===
The SPLASH Jr., At the bottom of the organization SPLASH, back up dancers on stage along with the SPLASH at the time of the event. It has been a juvenile from members of SPLASH, not only women, men are also included. The divided "Jr. First" and "Jr. Second" member recruitment to SPLASH is also performed. Original song called "Christmas song Jr." Also have. December 16, 2007 to (at music studio MOX), I made live event only SPLASH Jr..

== Discography ==
=== Singles ===
#	title	coupling	Release date	Note
1	"Soreyuke! Michinoku" (それゆけ!みちのく)	"Sekai ha Onnanoko ga Kaeru" (世界は女の子が変える) "Hatsukoi Uranai 60%" (初恋占い60%)	May 5, 2007	
2	"Tenshi Karano Message" (天使からのメッセージ)	Karaoke version a music box version	December 12, 2007	
3	"Sendai Tanabata Summer" (仙台七夕☆さま～っ(Summer))	"Takaramono -Kimi ni Aete Yokatta-" (たからもの〜君に逢えてよかった〜)	June 22, 2008	
4	"WINTER CHANCE" (WINTER・CHANCE)	"SPLASH no Christmas Song" (スプラッシュのクリスマスソング)	December 17, 2008	
5	"Kizuna -You're my best friend-" (キズナ～You're my best friend～)	"Ai no Uta" (あいのうた) "Sakura Fuwari" (サクラ、フワリ) "Takaramono -Kimi ni Aete Yokatta-" (たからもの〜君に逢えてよかった〜) (Acoustic version)	June 20, 2012	

== See also ==
- Ai-Girls
- Nogizaka46
