= Yuri Chinen =

Japanese singer and actor (born 1993)

- 知念 侑李
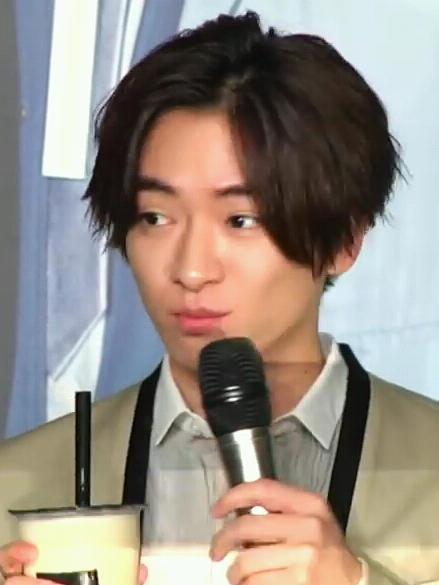
- 2023
- Born: November 30, 1993 (age 32); Tokyo Prefecture, Japan
- Education: Horikoshi High School
- Occupations: Singer; actor
- Years active: 2003–present
- Musical career
- Genres: J-pop; R&B; electropop; dance-pop; electronic; hip hop; dance; electronic dance
- Instrument: Vocals
- Labels: Starto Entertainment; Storm Labels

Japanese name
- Kanji: 知念 侑李
- Hiragana: ちねん ゆうり
Transcriptions
- Romanization: Chinen Yuri

Yuri Chinen (Japanese: 知念 侑李, Hepburn: Chinen Yūri; born November 30, 1993), is a Japanese singer and actor as well as member of Hey! Say! JUMP. He is under the management of Starto Entertainment.

== Early life ==
Chinen is the son of Takashi Chinen, a former Japanese gymnast who won a bronze medal in the 1992 Summer Olympics. He is named after Yuri Osawa, an announcer, whose name his mother liked, but is written with different characters; the yu is a character often used in girl's names (侑 Yū) and the ri is taken from Li (李), a surname his mother thought common among Chinese gold medalist gymnasts.

== Career ==
On June 2, 2003, Chinen entered Johnny & Associates as a trainee. Daiki Arioka, who would later also debut as a member of Hey! Say! JUMP, was also there during that time. On April 3, 2007, he began activities with the temporary group, Hey! Say! 7 starting with a public performance at a KAT-TUN concert.

On September 21, 2007, he made his debut as a member of Hey! Say! JUMP.

He was in a 2008 drama, One-Pound Gospel, as "Yoshihiko" in Episode 3, with Hey! Say! JUMP member Ryosuke Yamada and their senpai, Kazuya Kamenashi (KAT-TUN). In the same year, he played in the drama Sensei wa erai! as Umeno Wataru, along with other Hey! Say! JUMP members: Daiki Arioka, Ryosuke Yamada and Yuto Nakajima. In October 2008, he was in the drama called Scrap Teacher: Kyoshi Saisei as Yoshida Eitaro, along with the same Hey! Say! JUMP members that played with him in Sensei wa erai!.

As a supporter of the Japanese volleyball team for the FIVB World Grand Prix 2009, he performed in June 2009 with Ryosuke Yamada and Nakayama Yuma w/ B.I.Shadow, which is composed of Kento Nakajima, Kikuchi Fuma, Hokuto Matsumura and Yugo Kochi as members of the temporary group NYC Boys. The "C" of NYC boys comes from the initials of his family name "Chinen".

On March 2, 2010, a press release made by Johnny and Associates revealed that Chinen and Yamada would become members of a second Johnny's unit, NYC. They worked as a member of both Hey! Say! JUMP and NYC, which is a rarity in their talent agency. Ryo Nishikido (and formerly Uchi Hiroki) is the only such case of a Johnny's talent officially debuting in two groups (Kanjani8 and NEWS), and as NYC became an officially debuted Johnny's unit, Yamada and Chinen joined them in this unusual situation.

In September 2011, he played the voice of Brainy in the Japanese-dubbed version of the film The Smurfs. Hey! Say! JUMP's ninth single, "Magic Power", was used as the theme song for the film.

In January 2012, Chinen co-starred with his senpai Tomohisa Yamashita in a drama called Saiko no Jinsei no Owarikata: Ending Planner, in which he played Yamashita's younger brother. Chinen's character in the drama was a university student who was so focused on helping out a friend to the point of stealing money from his family's business. Atsuko Maeda and Nana Eikura joined the cast.

In June 2012, It was announced that Chinen would have his first lead-role drama series based on the manga Sprout, by Atsuko Nanba, on July 7 on NTV.

== Filmography ==
=== Shows ===
- Merengue no Kimochi (with Ryosuke Yamada, NTV, October 11, 2008)
- Vainilla (with Ryosuke Yamada, August 15, 2009)
- VS Arashi (with Ryosuke Yamada, Fuji TV, August 15, 2009)
- Dasshutsu Game Dero! (with Ryosuke Yamada, December 8, 2010)

For Hey! Say! 7 or Hey! Say! JUMP-related appearances, see Hey! Say! JUMP.

=== Dramas ===
- Yukan Club (NTV, 2007) as Ryota (Episode 2)
- 1 Pound no Fukuin (NTV, 2008) as Yoshihiko (Episode 3)
- Sensei wa Erai! (NTV, 2008) as Umeno Wataru
- Scrap Teacher: Kyoushi Saisei (NTV, 2008) as Yoshida Eitaro
- Saikō no Jinsei no Owarikata: Ending Planner (TBS, 2012) as Hayato Ihara
- Sprout (NTV, 2012) as Narahashi Sōhei
- Yorozu Uranaidokoro Onmyōya e Yōkoso (Fuji TV, 2013) as Shunta Sawazaki
- Hissatsu Shigotonin 2014 (TV Asahi, 2014) as Ryū
- Jigoku Sensei Nube (NTV, 2014) as Kurita Makoto
- Hissatsu Shigotonin 2015 (TV Asahi, 2015) as Ryū
- Hissatsu shigotonin 2016 (9/25) as Ryu
- Hissatsu shigotonin 2018 as Ryu
- Atama Ni Kiitemo Aho To Wa Tatakauna 2019 as Kotaro Tanimura

=== Movies ===
- Nanako to Nanao (2004), Nanao
- Nin x Nin: The Ninja Star Hattori (2004), Kenichi Mitsuba
- Sword of the Stranger (2007), Kotaro (voice)
- The Smurfs (2011), Brainy (voice, Japanese-dubbed version)
- Samurai Hustle (2014), Suzuki Yoshinosuke
- Samurai Hustle Returns (2016), Suzuki Yoshinosuke
- Gold Medal Man (2016), Akita Senichi
- Mumon: The Land of Stealth (2017), Oda Nobukatsu
- Teen Bride (2017), Isuzu Ebina
- Kids on the Slope (2018), Kaoru Nishimi
- Samurai Hustle: Full Throttle (2027), Suzuki Yoshinosuke

=== Appearances ===
- Aiba Manabu
- Haneru no Tobira
- Hirunandesu
- Hyakushiki
- Hyakushiki Volleyball SP
- Itadaki High JUMP
- Little Tokyo Live
- Shounen Club
- School Kakumei! (April 2009–present, NTV)
- VS Arashi
- Yan Yan JUMP

=== Stage ===
- Playzone 2007: Change 2 Chance (performed with Shonentai, 2007) as Ken
- Johnny's World 2012
- Johnny's World Kanshasai 2013
- Teru-kun, kamitteru! 2021
- Chi☆Q Sayonara Concert Metsubo!! 2025

=== Concerts ===
For Hey! Say! JUMP-related concerts and albums, see Hey! Say! JUMP.

== Discography ==
=== Solos ===
- "On The Wind"
- "Kawaii Kimi no Koto da Mono"
- "Ookiku nare boku"
- "Love Parade" (originally Arashi's song)

=== Duets ===
- "Wish" with Akasaka Akira (Hikaru Genji) in Playzone 2007
- "Stars in Heaven" with Ryosuke Yamada (the song is also known as "Future Earth" or "Mirai no Chikyu ni Mukatte")
- "You & You" with Yuto Nakajima
- "Super Super Night" with Kota Yabu & Yuto Nakajima
- "Pet Shop Love Motion" with Yuya Takaki, Kei Inoo & Yuto Nakajima
- "Boku to Keito" with Keito Okamoto

=== Songs written ===
- "Smile Song"
- "Ookiku nare boku"
- "Boku to Keito" with Keito Okamoto written for DEAR Album
