= Akuma na Koi / NYC =

"Akuma na Koi/NYC"

Single by Yuma Nakayama w/B.I.Shadow/NYC boys
- Released: (Japan) July 15, 2009
- Recorded: 2009
- Genre: J-pop
- Label: J Storm

Yuma Nakayama w/B.I.Shadow/NYC boys singles chronology
"Akuma na Koi/NYC" (2009)	"Yūki 100%" (2010)

"Akuma na Koi/NYC" (悪魔な恋／NYC) is the debut single of the J-pop group Yuma Nakayama w/B.I.Shadow and NYC, which was temporary unit.

== Track listing ==
=== Limited Edition A ===
CD

1. "Akuma na Koi" (悪魔な恋) (Yuma Nakayama w/B.I.Shadow)
2. NYC (NYCboys)
3. Dial Up (NYC)

DVD

1. "Akuma na Koi" (悪魔な恋) Music Clip (PV)
2. Making
3. Jacket Shooting
4. 「NYC」@International Forum 2009.6.7

=== Limited Edition B ===
CD

1. "Akuma na Koi" (悪魔な恋) (Yuma Nakayama w/B.I.Shadow)
2. NYC (NYCboys)
3. Dial Up (NYC)

DVD

1. NYC Music Clip (PV)
2. Making
3. Jacket Shooting
4. 「NYC」@International Forum 2009.6.7

=== Regular Edition ===
CD

1. "Akuma na Koi" (悪魔な恋) (Yuma Nakayama w/B.I.Shadow)
2. NYC (NYCboys)
3. "Aoi Kisetsu" (蒼い季節) (NYCboys)
4. "Akuma na Koi" (悪魔な恋) (Original Karaoke)
5. NYC (Original Karaoke)

== Charts ==
Chart (2011)	Peak position
Japan Oricon Weekly Singles Chart	1
Japan OriconJuly 2009 Monthly Singles Chart	4
Japan OriconAugust 2009 Monthly Singles Chart	5
Japan Oricon2009 Yearly Singles Chart	13

== Sales and certifications ==
Country	Provider	Sales	Certification
Japan	RIAJ	?	Platinum
