= Haina! =

Single by NYC
- Released: (Japan) May 25, 2012
- Recorded: 2012
- Genre: J-pop
- Label: Johnny's Entertainment
- Producer: Johnny Kitagawa

NYC singles chronology
"Wonderful Cupid/Glass no Mahō" (2012)	"Haina!" (2012)

"'Haina!" (ハイナ！) is the fifth single of NYC released on May 25, 2012. It was certified Gold by the Recording Industry Association of Japan.

== Single description ==
“Haina!” is described as the perfect summer tune that everyone can sing and dance to. It was chosen as the ending theme song for the TBS variety program called ‘Akarui☆Mirai‘, which started airing last April 22, 2012.

The single will be released in three different version. Limited Edition A, Limited Edition B and a Regular Edition.

== Track listing ==
Regular Edition CD
No.	Title	Length
1.	"Haina!" (ハイナ！)	3:58
2.	"Tic Tac ~Bokura no Harmony~" (Tic Tac ～僕らのハーモニー～)	4:03
3.	"Ameoto" (雨音)	3:06
4.	"Haina! (Original Karaoke)" (ハイナ！（オリジナル・カラオケ）)	3:58
5.	"Tic Tac ~Bokura no Harmony~ (Original Karaoke" (Tic Tac ～僕らのハーモニー～（オリジナル・カラオケ）)	4:03
6.	"Ameoto (Original Karaoke)" (雨音（オリジナル・カラオケ）)	3:06
Total length:		22:14

Limited Edition A CD
No.	Title	Lyrics	Length
1.	"Haina!" (ハイナ！)		3:58
2.	"Haina! (Original Karaoke)"	ハイナ！（オリジナル・カラオケ）	3:59
Total length:			7:57

Limited Edition A DVD
No.	Title	Length
1.	"Haina! (Music Clip)" (「ハイナ！」Music Clip)
2.	"Haina! (Music Clip Making)" (「ハイナ！」Music Clip Making)
3.	"Haina! (Choreography Video)" (「ハイナ！」振付講座)
Total length:		APPROX. 32mins.

Limited Edition B CD
No.	Title	Lyrics	Length
1.	"Haina!" (ハイナ！)		3:58
2.	"Haina! (Original Karaoke)"	ハイナ！（オリジナル・カラオケ）	3:59
Total length:			7:57

Limited Edition B DVD
No.	Title	Length
1.	"Wonderful Cupid (Music Clip)" (「ワンダフル キューピット」Music Clip)
2.	"Haina! (Jacket Shoot Making)" (「ハイナ！」ジャケット撮影Making)
3.	"Haina! (Choreography Video)" (「ハイナ！」振付講座)
Total length:		APPROX. 31mins.

== Chart performance ==
Haina! debuted at no. 2 spot just behind AKB48's "Manatsu no Sounds Good!" on Oricon Daily Single Chart with 38,740 sales. It sold a total of 91,082 copies in its first week.

== Charts and certifications ==
=== Charts ===
Chart (2012)	Peak position	Sales
Japan Oricon Daily Singles Chart	2	38,740
Japan Oricon Weekly Singles Chart	2	91,082
Japan Oricon Monthly Singles Chart	7	106,050

=== Sales and certifications ===
Country	Provider	Sales	Certification
Japan	RIAJ	106,050	Gold

== Release ==
Region	Date	Format	Distributor
Japan	May 25, 2012	CD single (JECN-0282); CD+DVD A (JECN-0278/0279); CD+DVD B (JECN-0280/0281)	J Storm
