= Ya-ya-yah =

Japanese music group

Ya-Ya-yah is a former Johnny's Jr. group from Johnny & Associates.

== History ==
The group was formed in 2001. On May 15, 2002, the group released double A-side single "Yūki 100%/Sekai ga Hitotsu ni Narumade." The single debuted at #9 on the Oricon charts. On September 24, 2007, members Kota Yabu and Hikaru Yaotome debuted under Hey! Say! JUMP. As of November 30, 2007 after the resignation of Taiyo Ayukawa from Johnny & Associates, Ya-Ya-yah has been removed from the Johnny & Associates official line-up. In 2010, the remaining previous Ya-Ya-yah member Shoon Yamashita, resigned from the company.

== Former members ==
- Y Kota Yabu (Left in 2007, debuted under Hey! Say! JUMP)
- Y Hikaru Yaotome (Left in 2007, debuted under Hey! Say! JUMP)
- A Naoya Akama (Left in 2004)
- Y Shoon Yamashita (Resigned in 2010)
- A Taiyo Ayukawa (Left in 2007, resigned)
- Y Yuuki Yoshida (Left in 2002)
- A Yasuhiro Ando (Left in 2002)
- H Masaki Hoshino (Left in 2004)

== Single ==
- Yuuki 100% (by Yabu, Akama, Yamashita, Ayukawa, and Hoshino)

== Television ==
- Ya-Ya-yah (Hatena Vision Channel)
