= NYC (band) =

Japanese pop band

- Origin: Tokyo, Japan
- Genres: Japanese Pop
- Years active: 2010–2014
- Label: Johnny’s Entertainment
- Members: Ryosuke Yamada; Yuri Chinen; Yuma Nakayama
- Past members: Kento Nakajima; Kikuchi Fuma; Hokuto Matsumura; Yugo Kochi
- Website: NYC Official

NYC is a Japanese band. The band's members are Ryosuke Yamada and Yuri Chinen, who are members of another Japanese band called Hey! Say! JUMP, and Johnny's Jr. Yuma Nakayama in 2010. Before that, the seven-member unit NYC Boys (stylized NYC boys) was formed on June 7, 2009, to promote the FIVB World Grand Prix 2009, an event that began on July 31 and ended on August 23, 2009. They performed the theme song "NYC" in Tokyo and Osaka before each game.

== History ==
On June 7, 2009, at the concert "Forum Shinkiroku!! Johnny's Jr. 1 Day 4 Performances Yaruzo!", it was announced that Ryosuke Yamada and Yuri Chinen of Hey! Say! JUMP would join Yuma Nakayama w/B.I. Shadow to form the NYC Boys. On July 15, 2009, their first single, "NYC/Akuma na Koi", "NYC" being the theme song for the FIVB World Grand Prix 2009, was released. During the announcement for forming the NYC Boys, it was said that the group would be a temporary one, only active for the time of the volleyball tournament which was from July 31 to August 23, but even after the end of the tournament, the members of the group would meet periodically to perform their songs.

In November, the media announced that they would be guest appearing on Japan's highest-rated annual music television show, Kōhaku Uta Gassen, on December 31, 2009. Other guest appearances this year include FNS Kayosai on December 2, 2009.

On January 1, 2010, the media announced that the group would not be a temporary one anymore and that Ryosuke Yamada and Yuri Chinen would be working as members of both Hey! Say! JUMP and the NYC Boys in the future. On March 3, 2010, it was announced on Johnny's website that NYC without the boys (B.I.Shadow) would release a new single entitled "Yūki 100%", opening theme song for an anime entitled Nintama Rantarō, the coupling song entitled "Yume no Tane" being the ending theme. Their single was released April 7, 2010. The song "Yūki 100%" topped Japan's Billboard's Weekly Hot 100 and Oricon's Weekly Chart. On October 20, 2010, NYC released a single titled Yoku Asobi Yoku Manabe. The single became #1 on the Oricon weekly charts in its first week of sales.

On March 9, 2011, the group released a new single with the name 'Yume Tamago', which peaked first on the Oricon Daily Singles chart with 31,393 sales and ended up in fourth position on the Oricon Monthly Singles chart with 154,140 sales, being certified gold by the RIAJ.

In February 2012, NYC released their 4th single, which is titled Wonderful Cupid and contains Yuma Nakayama's solo song Glass no Mahou. In May 2012, NYC released their 5th single, titled HAINA!.

On January 28, 2025, during Nakayama's last concert series as a Starto Entertainment artist, called "YUMA NAKAYAMA LIVE TOUR 2025 Wings For The GOOD VIBES", Yamada and Chinen appeared as guests, reviving NYC for one afternoon. In a nostalgia-filled reunion, after around 12 years absence, the trio sang "NYC" and "Yoku asobi yoku manabe". NYC has not officially disbanded, as Yamada and Nakayama stated, they are leaving it as is, so if there is a possibility in the future to reunite, they can.

== Members ==
=== Current members ===
- N Nakayama Yuma
- Y Yamada Ryosuke
- C Chinen Yuri

=== Former members ===
- Boys
  - Kento Nakajima
  - Kikuchi Fuma
  - Hokuto Matsumura
  - Yugo Kochi

== Discography ==
=== Single ===
Release date	Title	Charts	Sales
Release date	Title	JPN	Sales
July 15, 2009	Akuma na Koi / NYC	1	JPN: 287,000
April 7, 2010	Yuuki 100%	1	JPN: 122,000
October 20, 2010	Yoku Asobi Yoku Manabe	1	JPN: 118,000
March 9, 2011	Yume Tamago	2	JPN: 148,218
January 4, 2012	Wonderful Cupid / Glass no Mahou	1	JPN: 110,132
May 25, 2012	Haina!	2	JPN: 114,065

=== Music videos ===
Year	Title	Notes	Ref.
2009	"Akumana koi"		
2009	"NYC"		
2025	"NYC" / Yoku asobi yoku manabe"	"YUMA NAKAYAMA LIVE TOUR 2025 Wings For The GOOD VIBES" live version	

== Concert ==
- Forum Shinkiroku!! Johnny's Jr. 1 Day 4 Performances Yaruzo! Concert (June 7, 2009)
- Johnny's Theater "Summary" 2010
- Hey! Say! JUMP & Yuuki 100% Concert with NYC (April 10, 2011 - May 29, 2011)
