= Yūki 100% =

1993 single by Hikaru Genji

Single by Hikaru Genji

from the album Heart'n Hearts
- Released: May 13, 1993
- Genre: J-pop
- Length: 4:10
- Label: Pony Canyon
- Songwriters: Gorō Matsui, Kōji Makaino
- Producer: Kōji Makaino

Hikaru Genji singles chronology
"Kimi to Subayaku Slowly" (1993)	"Yūki 100%" (1993)	"Boys in August" (1993)

"Yūki 100%" (勇気100%, Yūki Hyaku Pāsento; "Courage 100%") is the 21st single by Japanese boyband Hikaru Genji, released on May 13, 1993. It was used as the theme song of the animated series Nintama Rantarō, while the B-side "Hohoemi o Azukete" was used as an insert song for the same anime.

The song is Nintama Rantarō's only opening theme song. The original version was used for season 1 (1993–1994), while their self cover under the name Genji Super 5 was used for seasons 2 through 9 (1994–2001). Johnny's Entertainment groups then covered the song six times: Ya-Ya-Yah (seasons 10–16, 2002–2008), Hey! Say! JUMP (season 17, 2009), NYC (seasons 18–19, 2010–2011), Sexy Zone (seasons 20–23, 2012–2016), Junior Boys (seasons 24–29, 2016–2022) and Johnny's Jr. (seasons 30– , 2022–Ongoing).

== Track listing ==
All tracks are written by Gorō Matsui and Kōji Makaino.

No.	Title	Length
1.	"Yūki 100%"	4:10
2.	"Hohoemi o Azukete" (微笑みをあずけて "Keep Your Smile with Me")	3:20
3.	"Yūki 100% (Minus Lead Vocal)"	4:10
4.	"Hohoemi o Azukete (Minus Lead Vocal)"	3:20
Total length:		15:00

== NYC cover ==
"Yūki 100%"

Single by NYC
- Released: (Japan) April 7, 2010
- Recorded: 2010
- Genre: J-pop
- Label: Johnny's Entertainment
- Songwriters: Gorō Matsui, Kōji Makaino

NYC singles chronology
"NYC(sky high)" (2009)	"Yūki 100%" (2010)	"Yoku Asobi Yoku Manabe" (2010)

Limited Edition Cover

"Yūki 100%" was covered as the debut song of the Japanese boy band "NYC" (abbreviation of its three members' names, Nakayama, Yamada, and Chinen). It was released under J Storm on April 7, 2010.

The single was released in two versions: limited edition which includes the promotional video and the jacket shooting while the regular edition comes out with instrumentals. The limited edition came with three NYC photo cards type A and the first press of the regular edition came with three NYC photo cards type B. "Yuuki 100%" was used as the fifth opening theme for the anime Nintama Rantaro while "Yume no Tane" its B-side was used as the 20th ending theme. It peaked at #1 on the Oricon charts and sold 120,516 copies in total in 13 weeks.

=== Track listing ===
==== Limited Edition ====
CD

1. Yuuki 100% (勇気100%)
2. Yume no Tane (ゆめのタネ)

DVD

1. Recording & Jacket Shooting Off Shot (レコーディング＆ジャケット撮影オフショット)

==== Regular Edition ====
1. Yuuki 100% (勇気100%)
2. Yume no Tane
3. Yuuki 100% (勇気100%) (instrumental)
4. Yume no Tane (instrumental)

== Charts and certifications ==
=== Charts ===
Chart (1993)	Peak position
Oricon weekly singles	7
Chart (2002)	Peak position
Oricon weekly singles: Ya-Ya-Yah cover	9
Chart (2010)	Peak position
Billboard Japan Hot 100: NYC cover	1
Oricon weekly singles: NYC cover	1

=== Sales and certifications ===
Chart (1993)	Amount
Oricon physical sales	109,000
Chart (2002)	Amount
Oricon physical sales: Ya-Ya-Yah cover	59,000
Chart (2010)	Amount
Oricon physical sales: NYC cover	121,000
RIAJ physical shipping certification: NYC cover	Gold (100,000+)
