= Golden SixTones =

Japanese television variety show

- ゴールデンストーンズ
- Genre: Variety Show; Game Show; Comedy
- Directed by: Yuta Masuda
- Starring: SixTones; Jesse; Taiga Kyomoto; Hokuto Matsumura; Yugo Kochi; Shintaro Morimoto; Juri Tanaka
- Opening theme: Golden by SixTones
- Country of origin: Japan
- Original language: Japanese

Production
- Producers: Soichiro Shimada; Yoshihiro Miyazaki
- Running time: 45 minutes

Original release
- Network: Nippon Television
- Release: April 6, 2025 – present

Golden SixTones (ゴールデンストーンズ; stylized as Golden SixTONES and pronounced "Golden Stones") is a Japanese television variety show produced by Nippon Television. The program features the six-member boy group SixTones. The series premiered in April 2025 and airs weekly on Sundays at 9:00 p.m. JST as a regular program on the Nippon Television network.

== Format ==
It is a studio-based Japanese variety program featuring members of SixTones as the main participants. The show centers on game-based segments and talk portions involving invited guests. Many segments are structured as competitions in which participants compete for gourmet food rewards. In some competitions, only the winner receives the reward, while in individual or team-based formats, the quantity and toppings of the food vary depending on the outcome.

Recurring segments include Size no Bansan, a game centered on judging whether everyday objects fit within a designated space; Dotai Kyuji, which involves visual perception challenges presented in a sports-themed format; Matsuken Number, a rhythm-based counting game performed to music; Dajare Red Carpet, a fast-paced quiz segment focused on identifying wordplay, and many others.

== Cast ==
=== Main Cast ===
- SixTones
  - Jesse
  - Taiga Kyomoto
  - Hokuto Matsumura
  - Yugo Kochi
  - Shintaro Morimoto
  - Juri Tanaka

=== Recurring MCs ===
- Haruna Kondo
- Shingo Fujimori
- Shigeo Takahashi
- Eiko Kano
- Matsui Kemuri
- Time Machine 3Go

== Episodes ==
=== Pilot ===
Pilot Episodes

No.	Original air date	Guest	Note	Ref.
1	September 22, 2024	Kazushige Nagashima, Miki Fujimoto, Shotaro Mamiya	Broadcast as Game of SixTones	
2	January 1, 2025	Masaki Suda, Haruna Kawaguchi	Broadcast as Game of SixTones	
3	March 15, 2025	Ken Mitsuishi, Riko Fukumoto	Special program before the regular broadcast	
4	March 16, 2025	Kei Tanaka	Special program before the regular broadcast	
5	April 2, 2025	-	Special program before the regular broadcast	

=== Regular Episodes ===
2025

No. overall	Episode	Original air date	Guest	Note	Ref.
1	1	April 6	Sanma Akashiya		
2	2	April 13	Shinobu Sakagami		
3	3	April 20	Ryohei Suzuki, Michiko Kichise		
4	4	April 27	Rina Kawaei, Ken Yasuda, Ryosuke Yamada		
5	5	May 4	Ichikawa Danjuro		
6	6	May 11	Yo Oizumi		
7	7	May 18	Tori Matsuzaka		
8	8	May 25	Shido Nakamura		
9	9	June 1	Hiromi Go, Misaki Emura		
10	10	June 8	Masami Nagasawa		
11	11	June 15	Go Ayano, Marin Honda		
12	12	June 22	Kazushige Nagashima		
13	13	June 29	Nanao, Daieisho Hayato		
14	14	July 6	Ami Touma, Nanoka Hara, Mone Kamishiraishi,Takanori Iwata, Sho Sakurai, Aimi Higa		
15	15	July 13	Kotaro Koizumi		
16	16	July 27	Shinichi Tsutsumi		
17	17	August 3	Miho Kanno		
18	18	August 10	Tomoya Nakamura, Nana Seino		
19	19	August 17	Takeru Satoh, Yu Miyazaki, Keita Machida, Jun Shison		
20	20	August 24	Yu Yokoyama, Minami Ishikawa, Shigeru Joshima		
21	21	August 31	Yokoyama Yu, Hakunofuji Tetsuya, Shiori Sato, Chocolate Planet, Shigeru Joshima	Broadcast live from Ryogoku Kokugikan after 24-Hour Television	
22	22	September 7	Shota Sometani, Tetsurō Degawa		
23	23	September 14	Toshinobu Kubota, Suzu Hirose, Fuma Kikuchi		
24	24	September 21	Kenichi Endo, Ano		
25	25	September 28	Shotaro Mamiya, Kocchi no Kento		
26	SP	October 5	Yoshino Sato, Nichika Yamada, Miiku Iwasawa, Aoi Miyazaki, Mitsuki Takahata, Wakatomoharu Minato, Wakamotoharu Minato, Shiori Sato	2 Hour special	
27	26	October 12	Mitsuhiro Oikawa, Ken Mitsuishi, Junki Tozuka, Yu Inaba, Hiyori Sakurada, Hayato Sano, Kanako Yanagihara, Natsuko Yokozawa, Kemuri Matsui, Yuchami, Masanori Hasegawa, Seiya		
28	27	October 19	Takumi Kitamura, Yuma Yamoto		
29	28	October 26	Sadao Abe, Takako Matsu		
30	29	November 2	Kyoko Yoshine, Yoshihide Kiryu		
31	30	November 9	Shingo Fujimori, Gekidan Hitori, Hironari Yamazaki		
32	31	November 16	Keiko Kitagawa, Toshiaki Kasuga, Hironari Yamazaki		
33	SP	November 23	Mana Ashida, Yu Yokoyama, Soya Igari	1.5 Hour special	
34	32	November 30	Aya Ueto		
35	33	December 7	Yuko Araki, Tsuyoshi Muro, Shinya Kote		
36	34	December 21	Tsuyoshi Muro, Shinya Kote, Nanase Nishino		

2026

No. Overall	Episode	Original air date	Guest	Note	Ref.
37	SP	January 1	Shun Oguri, Yoshiki, Tetsurō Degawa, Kana Kurashina, Koji Yamamoto	New year's 3 hour special	
38	35	January 11	Ryoko Shinohara, Fujiki Naohito, Haru Kashiwagi, Terunosuke Takezai		
39	36	January 18	Untouchable, Asami Miura		
40	37	January 25	Toma Ikuta, Sawa Nimura, Mirei Sasaki, Yoshiki, Tetsurō Degawa		
41	38	February 1	Sho Sakurai, Sho Nakata		
42	39	February 15	Tasuku Emoto, Kazuki Kitamura, First Summer Uika		
43	40	February 22	Nao, Ayako Imoto		
44	41	March 1	Kento Yamazaki, Anna Yamada, Gordon Maeda, Yuma Yamoto, Asuka Kudo, Hiroshi Tachi		
45	42	March 15	Koichi Domoto, Hikakin		
46	43	March 22	Ryo Narita, Amane Okayama		
47	44	March 29	Nana Mori, Chocolate Planet		
48	SP	April 5	Masaki Suda, Chisako Takashima	2 Hour Special	
49	45	April 12	Anne Watanabe, Haruna Kondo		
50	46	April 19	Jun Shison, Neru Nagahama		
51	47	April 26	Mitsuhiro Oikawa, Chocolate Planet		
52	48	May 3	Kaori Sakamoto		
53	49	May 10	Meguro Ren, Fumiya Takahashi, Akihisa Shiono, Keisuke Watanabe, Junki Tozuka, Shinya Kote		
54	50	May 17	Toshiaki Karasawa, Time Machine 3Go		
55	51	May 24	Tomoya Nakamura, Gekidan Hitori, Hironari Yamazaki		
56	52	June 7	Kento Kaku		
57	53	June 14	Megumi, Eiji Kotōge, Eiko Kano		
58	54	June 21	Honami Suzuki, Shinya Kote, Mari Hoshino, Akina Minami, Kanako Yanagihara, Ami Suzuki		
59	55	June 28	Akina Nakamori		
60	56	July 5	Sae Okazaki, Tetsuji Tamayama, Nozomi Sasaki		
61	57	July 12	Kanna Hashimoto, Kemuri Matsui, Nishikigoi		
62	58	July 19	Haruka Fukuhara, Natsuki Deguchi, Kinnikun Nakayama		
63	59	July 26	Untouchable (Hironari Yamazaki), Gekidan Hitori, Impossible (Eiji・Hiru-chan), Cotton (Kyon・Shinji Nishimura), Sissonne (Shinobu Hasegawa), Jungle Pocket (Hirohisa Ota・Otake), Jonny Shimura, Time Machine 3Go (Futoshi Seki・Yamamoto Kouji), Takuro (Kimura Bando・Yu Akagi), Tokyo Hoteison (Shogo・Takeru), Hanako (Tatsuhiro Kikuta・Hiroki Akiyama), Mamatarte (Himan Ōtsuru・Yohei Hiwara), Miyashita Kusanagi (Kenshō Miyashita・Kōki Kusanagi), Yutty, Reiwa Roman (Kemuri Matsui)		
64	60	August 2	Ken Matsudaira, Yudai Chiba, Ayami Nakajo		
65	61	August 9	Kana Kurashina, Takahisa Masuda, Mai Shiraishi, Seiya		
66	62	August 16	Mio Imada, Tasuku Emoto		
67	63	August 23	Teruyoshi Uchimura, Hironari Yamazaki, Kyoko Yoshine, Ikusaburo Yamazaki, Asami Miura, Time Machine 3Go (Futoshi Seki・Yamamoto Kouji)		
68	SP	August 29	Time Machine 3Go (Futoshi Seki・Yamamoto Kouji), Shingo Fujimori, Kemuri Matsui, Nasunakanishi (Akiyuki Nasu・Shigeki Nakanishi), Animal Hamaguchi, Kyoko Hamaguchi, Taiyo Sugiura, Nozomi Tsuji, Narumi Takahashi, Misumi Takahashi, Miyu Honda, Sara Honda, Minami Ishikawa	Aired as a late-night segment during 24-Hour Television	
69	64	August 30	Mari Hoshino, Shigeru Joshima, Time Machine 3Go (Futoshi Seki・Yamamoto Kouji)	Broadcast live from Ryogoku Kokugikan after 24-Hour Television	
70	SP	September 6	Mio Imada, Tasuku Emoto, Haruka Igawa	Special episode to commemorate the release of movie The Swan and the Bats	
71	65	September 6	Time Machine 3Go (Futoshi Seki・Yamamoto Kouji), Kemuri Matsui	Behind the scenes on the day of 24-Hour Television	
72	66	September 20	Hiroshi Tamaki, Narumi Takahashi	66th regular broadcast	
73	67	September 27	Sota Fukushi, Ryohei Otani, Kenichi Takito		
74	SP	October 11	Yo Oizumi, Tomohisa Yamashita	Hakone Ekiden: Our Story Collaboration Special	
75	68	October 18	Oriental Radio (Shingo Fujimori・Atsuhiko Nakata), Shotaro Mamiya		
76	69	October 25	Ryunosuke Kamiki, Minami Hamabe, Yuki Yamada		
77	70	November 1	Kenta Kiritani, Wataru Ichinose		
78	71	November 8	Hiroki Akiyama (Hanako), Impossible, Takahiro Ogata (Panther), Ryotaro Kan (Panther), Tatsuhiro Kikuta (Hanako), Gekidan Hitori, Takashi Sakai (The Mommy), Sanshiro, Joyman, Tom Brown, Soichi Nakaoka (Lotch), Nishikigoi, Pekopa, Kemuri Matsui (Reiwa Roman), Miyashita Kusanagi, Mo Chugakusei, Hironari Yamazaki (Untouchable)		
79	72	November 15	Koyuza Sanyutei, Taihei Hayashiya, Harenosuke Tatekawa, Ichinosuke Shumputei, Katsura Miyaji, Takao Yamada	Golden SixTONES x Shoten 60th Anniversary	
80	73	November 22	Masami Nagasawa, Tasuku Emoto, Shizuka Ishibashi		
81	SP	November 29	Hideyuki Nakayama, Reiko Shiota, Rie Tanaka, Aaron Wolf , Ryuji Akiyama, Yuki Hirako	Golden SixTONES × Shuichi Collaboration Special	

== Production ==
Golden SixTones was developed by Nippon Television as a new regular variety program following the conclusion of Gyoretsu no Dekiru Sodanjo, which ended in March 2025 after a 23 year run. The program is an expanded and rebranded version of Game of SixTones, a special program that aired in September 2024 and January 2025 and received a positive response, leading to its serialization.

The show is produced by Nippon Television, with Yoshihiro Miyazaki serving as producer. Nippon Television executives positioned the program as a flagship variety series within the network’s Sunday night lineup, airing after The! Tetsuwan! DASH!! and Sekai no Hatemade ItteQ!. The network cited the variety skills and studio presence of SixTones as key factors in assigning the group to the competitive 9:00 p.m. time slot.

The production team has stated that the program emphasizes studio-based games and guest-driven segments, aiming to highlight the group’s chemistry and interaction in a prime-time setting.

== Broadcast and distribution ==
The program airs weekly on Nippon Television every Sunday at 9:00 p.m. JST. In addition to its terrestrial broadcast, episodes are made available for catch-up streaming on Hulu, TVer, and NTV TADA. Beginning with the May 11, 2025 broadcast, the series also became available for catch-up streaming on Netflix, marking the first time a regular variety program produced by Nippon Television has been distributed on the platform. Episodes are released on Netflix sequentially following their television broadcast, with international distribution planned to roll out gradually outside Japan.
