= 6Sixtones =

Japanese television variety show

- シックスストーンズ
- Genre: Variety Show
- Directed by: Koichiro Yanagisawa
- Starring: SixTones; Jesse; Taiga Kyomoto; Hokuto Matsumura; Yugo Kochi; Shintaro Morimoto; Juri Tanaka
- Country of origin: Japan
- Original language: Japanese
- No. of episodes: 6

Production
- Producers: Takahiro Ito; Yoshiyuki Sakamoto
- Running time: 100 minutes

Original release
- Network: TBS
- Release: January 12, 2026 – present

6Sixtones (シックスストーンズ; stylized as 6SixTONES and pronounced "Six Stones") is a Japanese television variety special broadcast by TBS Television. The program stars the six-member Japanese idol group SixTones and was produced as a commemorative project marking the group's sixth anniversary since debut. The show features large scale location segments, guest appearances, and unscripted interactions centered on the group's dynamics. The first episode aired on January 12, 2026, 9:00 p.m. JST, on TBS Television.

== Overview ==
6Sixtones was developed by TBS as SixTones’ first television program on the network to carry the group’s name as the main title. The project was conceived around the number six, reflecting both the number of group members and the anniversary milestone. TBS announced that the program would consist of six special episodes, produced and broadcast as part of the anniversary project rather than as a regular weekly series.

The program’s concept focuses on presenting the members in unpredictable situations designed to elicit natural reactions and group dynamics, with minimal reliance on scripted dialogue.

== Format ==
6Sixtones is produced as a special event variety program. Each episode is structured around multiple segments that primarily involve location filming and activity-based content.

The production staff research past public statements made by the members of SixTones. These previously published remarks are used as source material when planning the segments featured in each episode.

The program is described as being produced without a fixed script and places emphasis on unscripted conversation during filming. Content progresses through the members’ interactions within each segment rather than through prewritten dialogue.

Each episode is broadcast as an extended special, exceeding the standard one-hour duration commonly associated with Japanese variety programming. The episodes are aired individually rather than as part of a continuous weekly broadcast schedule.

== Cast ==
=== Main Cast ===
- SixTones
  - Jesse
  - Taiga Kyomoto
  - Hokuto Matsumura
  - Yugo Kochi
  - Shintaro Morimoto
  - Juri Tanaka

=== MC ===
- Haruna Kondo (Ep.1)
- Oideyasu Oda (Ep.1)
- Masatoshi Namba (Ep.1)
- Yuki Hirako (Ep.1, 2, 4, 5)
- Moriyama Shintaro (Ep.2 & 5)
- Yuko Wakabayashi (Ep.2 & 5)

=== Guest ===
- Yo Oizumi (Ep.1)
- Kano sisters (Ep.1)
- Kazuya Kamenashi (Ep.2)
- Kazunari Ninomiya (Ep.3)
- Tsuyoshi Muro (Ep.4)
- Yuka Kagami (Ep.4)
- Mongol800 (Ep.4)
- Kazushige Nagashima (Ep.5)
- Hiroaki Ogi (Ep.5)
- Atsuhiro Tsuda (Ep.5)
- Seira Anzai (EP.5)
- Ikusaburo Yamazaki (EP.5)
- Aju Makita (EP.5)
- Nana Mori (EP.5)

=== VTR Guest ===
- Osamu Mukai (Ep.2)
- Takako Matsu (Ep.2)
- EXIT (Ep.2)
- Matsumoto Wakana (Ep.4)
- Shingo Yanagisawa (Ep.5)
- Matsuya Onoe (Ep.5)
- Chocolate Planet (EP.5)

== Episodes ==
No.	Title	Guest(s)	Ref.	Original release date
1	"Episode 1"	Yo Oizumi		12 January 2026
SixTones members are made to board a helicopter and travel to the Mount Fuji area. This setup is based on comments they had previously made in magazine interviews.: A poster photo shoot segment conducted for the program's key visual, which included a surprise staged explosion effect.; A food-related segment filmed in a local shopping district in Atami, featuring an all-you-can-eat style activity carried out with cooperation from the city.; A golf segment filmed at a Hoshino Resorts property, in which the members participated in indoor golf activities.; A surprise two hours trip to South Korea.
2	"Episode 2"	Kazuya Kamenashi		31 March 2026
SixTones members are confined inside a giant present box after finishing a concert in Nagoya and are informed that they cannot leave until they accept all of the gifts prepared for them. The gifts are arranged in consultation with entertainers who have personal connections with each member and are designed so that none overlap.: For Jesse, who tends to get nervous, his acquaintance Osamu Mukai presents a “nervousness-overcoming project,” while Kazuya Kamenashi makes a surprise appearance to apply extreme pressure.; Takako Matsu prepares something to fulfill Hokuto Matsumura’s dream of winning a lottery.; Kanechika Daiki of EXIT, a friend of Juri Tanaka, presents a “fish tank UFO catcher.” If they can catch premium seafood such as spiny lobster, they will earn a reward dinner prepared on the spot by a top chef.
3	"Episode 3"	Kazunari Ninomiya		29 April 2026
The third episode features Kazunari Ninomiya of Arashi as a guest, joining SixTONES on a "bonding trip" aimed at strengthening their relationship. Despite limited prior interaction as a full group, the seven take part in a series of challenges prompted by "bonding cards," including quizzes and cooperative tasks. Filming includes segments at Azabudai Hills, where they share a meal, as well as in a private vehicle where additional activities take place. A central segment involves a "no honorifics" shopping challenge, requiring the members to speak casually to Ninomiya, diverging from standard senior-junior etiquette. The episode concludes with a barbecue, where the group engages in candid conversation reflecting their improved dynamic.
4	"Episode 4"	Tsuyoshi Muro		16 July 2026
To celebrate SixTones after the completion of their 50-date arena tour, actor Tsuyoshi Muro surprises the members with a trip to Okinawa after they are led to believe they are filming a music program. Despite heavy rain, the group spends the day carrying out activities requested by the members in advance, including visiting a private beach, eating Okinawa soba, and shopping for souvenirs. They also compete in a series of beach games with Olympic wrestling gold medalist Yuka Kagami and comedian Yuki Hirako. The trip concludes with a banquet featuring surprise appearances by Wakana Matsumoto and Okinawan rock band Mongol800, who perform live with SixTones.
5	"Episode 5"	Kazushige Nagashima		21 October 2026
Turning 60 this year, special guest Kazushige Nagashima takes SixTONES on a luxurious autumn trip to Kamakura, with the goal of teaching them how to become sophisticated, cool adults. The trip features a series of challenging tasks that the members are supposedly expected to handle as adults, with delicious Kamakura gourmet food at stake.
6	"Episode 6"	TBA	TBA	TBA
TBA

== Broadcast and distribution ==
6SixTONES premiered on TBS Television on January 12, 2026, airing in Japan from 20:55 to 22:57 JST and is scheduled as a set of six special broadcasts on the TBS network throughout 2026. In addition to its terrestrial broadcast on TBS (channel 6), episodes are made available for on-demand viewing via Japan’s major streaming catch-up platforms, including TVer and U-NEXT.
