= Eiko Kano =

Japanese comedian, singer, and kannushi (born 1982)

- 狩野 英孝
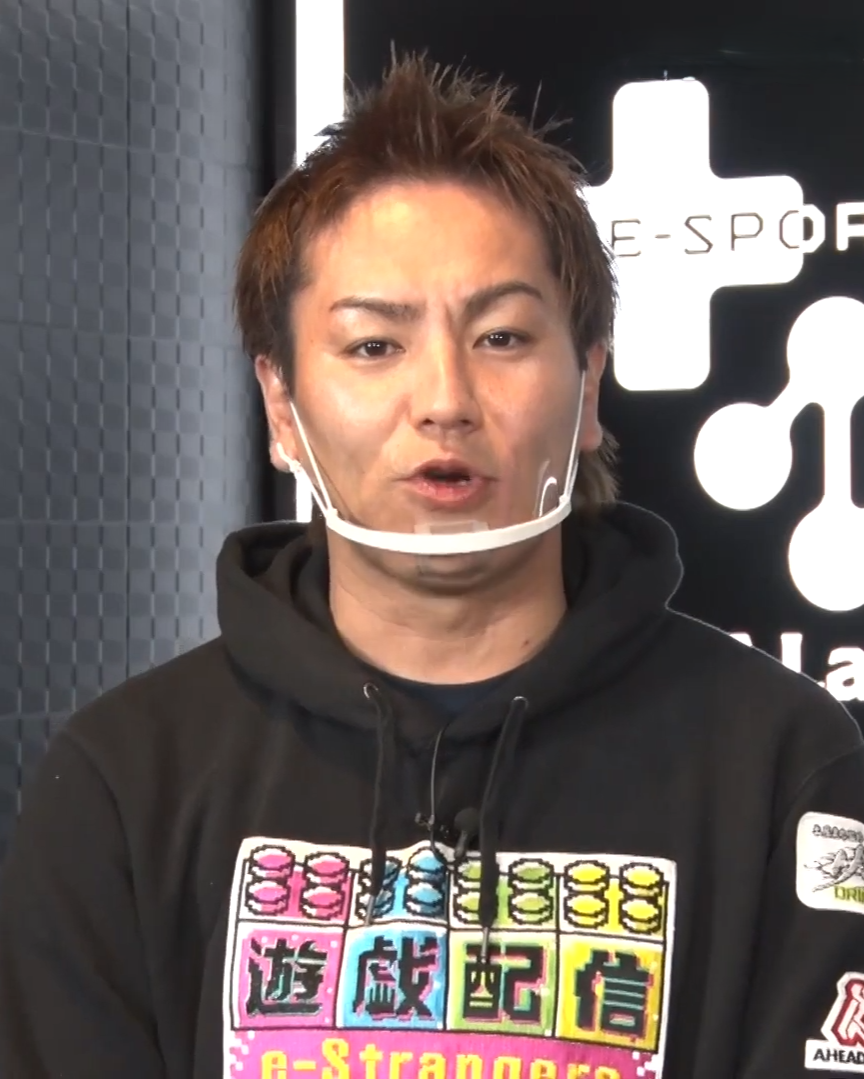
- Kano in 2022
- Born: February 22, 1982 (age 44); Kurikoma (now Kurihara), Kurihara District, Miyagi, Japan
- Other names: Eiko-chan; Kati
- Education: Miyagi Prefecture Tsukidate High School; Japan Institute of the Moving Image
- Occupations: Comedian, singer, kannushi
- Years active: 2003–
- Agent: Maseki Geinosha
- Known for: Chō Ponkotsu & Summers; Bakushō On-Air Battle; Bakushō Red Carpet; The Red Theater; Nekketsu Idol Academy: Akipara Jō; Ikemen Channel
- Height: 1.75 m (5 ft 9 in)
- Spouse: Unknown (m. 2011; div. 2014) Unknown (m. 2021)
- Website: Official profile

Notes
- Same year/generation as: Harisenbon; Shizzle

Eiko Kano (狩野 英孝, Kano Eikō; born 22 February 1982) is a Japanese comedian, singer, YouTuber, and kannushi (Shinto clergy) from Kurikoma (now Kurihara), Kurihara District, Miyagi. He is nicknamed Eiko-chan (英孝ちゃん, Eikō-chan) and Kati (カティ). As a lyricist and composer of 50TA, he is nicknamed Shinya Sakurada (桜田 神邪, Sakurada Shin'ya). He graduated from the Japan Institute of the Moving Image. He completed his kannushi training in Kokugakuin University. He was a former kyūdōka (archer) at the National Sports Festival of Japan.

== Personal life ==
Kano married an ordinary woman in 2011, but later divorced September 2014. In January 2017, Friday published an article about the alleged relationship of Kano and a 17-year old high schooler. In a press conference in the January 21, he confirmed the allegation but stated that the girl said that she was 22-years old. He remarried in 2021.

== Filmography ==
=== TV series ===
==== Current appearances ====
Regular appearances

Year	Title	Network
2016	Chō Ponkotsu & Summers	TV Tokyo

Quasi-regular appearances

Year	Title	Network	Notes
	Honoo-no Taiiku-kai TV	TBS	Appeared as a kyūdōka
	Ame Ta-lk!	TV Asahi	
2008	London Hearts	TV Asahi	
2008	Sand no Bonyarinu	TBC	

Special appearances

Year	Title	Network	Notes
2013	8Bang!	Sendai Television	"Kano-Pan Sanjō"

==== Former appearances ====
Regular appearances

Year	Title	Network	Notes	Ref.
2009	Nekketsu Idol Academy: Akipara Jō	Daiichi-TV		
2009	Eiko Kano no Kingusu Rōdo	NBN		
2010	Kojima × Kano × Esper 3P	Tokyo MX		
2011	Eiko Kano no Nadeshiko de Knight: Cooking	TBC	MC	
2014	Ponkotsu & Summers	TV Tokyo		

Quasi-regular appearances

Year	Title	Network
2007	Bonita! Bonita!! Nagoya Girls Collection	TVA

Special appearances

Year	Title	Network	Notes
2016	Owarai Tutori Three	Fuji TV	MC

==== Nationwide programmes ====
- NHK

Title
Bakushō On-Air Battle
BS Fureai Stage

- Nippon TV

Title
Ojisans Eleven
Enta no Kamisama
Shingo Katori no Tokujō! Tensei Shingo
99 Plus
Himitsu no Kenmin Show
Meringue no Kimochi
Jinsei ga Kawaru 1-funkan no Fukaii Hanashi

- Tokyo Broadcasting System

Year	Title
	Akashiya-san Channel
Koisuru Hanikami
Owarai Dynamite!
The Iromonea
Yaredeki! Sekai Dai Chōsen
All-Star Thanksgiving
Doors 2008
BS Branch
2009	Akuma no Keiyaku ni Sign: Akuma no Rentai Hoshōnin
	Akko ni Omakase!

- Fuji Television

Year	Title
	Bakushō Red Carpet
Bakushō Pink Carpet
The Three Theater
The Red Theater
2010	Run for Money: Tosochu
2013	Battle for Money: Sentochu
2013	Numer0n
	Ōi! Hiroiki Mura

- TV Asahi

Title
Warai no Kin Medal
Ikinari! Kogane Densetsu.
Otameshi ka!
Dosp 2
Ariyoshi Ponkotsu Tai

- TV Tokyo

Year	Title
	Shibusuta
Heikin Face
TV Champion
Inaka ni Tomarou
2016	Let's Tensai TV-kun

==== Local programmes ====
- Chubu-Nippon Broadcasting

Title
Natsumegudo

- Tōkai Television Broadcasting

Title
Morisugi!

- Sapporo Television Broadcasting

Year	Title
2013	Himano-Yu

=== Satellite programmes ===
Year	Title	Network	Notes
2008	Ikemen Channel	Perfect Choice	
2016	Kaidan no Shīhana Kika sete yo.	Entertainment-TV	MC

=== Radio ===
Year	Title	Network	Notes
	Eiko Kano no Nōgyara-kun	NCB	
	Recommen	NCB	
2009	DJ Tomoaki's Radio Show	Shimokita FM	
	Radipedia	J-Wave	Irregular Thursday appearances

=== Internet ===
Title	Website
Eiko Kano no Gekisha!! Pachipachi Paparazzi	Janbari TV
Instant Lover	BeeTV
Eiko Kano no Iku to Shinu kamo Shirenai Kan Tameshi	BeeTV

=== Advertisements ===
Year	Title	Notes	Ref.
2005	Mandom Gatsby		
2008	Toyo Suisan Maru-chan Men-zukuri Minna Tabe teru		
2008	King Kankō		
2008	Spike Way of the Samurai 3		
2008	Spike Kenka Bancho: Badass Rumble		
2008	Unilever Senzai Domestos Ziff	Domestos & Ziff Campaign	
2008	Toyota Corolla Rumion	Ameba & TV Asahi tie-up advert; Co-starring with Ai Haruna	
2012	Nexon Dungeon Fighter Online	Co-starring with Tetsurō Degawa	
2015	Kirin Nodogoshi <Nama>		
2016	Square Enix Hoshi no Dragon Quest		

=== Anime, drama ===
Year	Title	Role	Network	Notes
	Bihada Ichizoku	Tatsuya Yutenji (voice)	TV Tokyo	
2008	Operation Love	Cabaret boy	Fuji TV	
2009	The Quiz Show	Himself	NTV	Episode 5
2011	Hyper Yo-Yo	Kariudo Aino	TV Tokyo	
2012	Hana no Zubora-Meshi	Weather forecaster's older brother	TBS	Episode 8
2013	Rozu Uranai Sho: Onmyo-ya e Yokoso	Host	KTV	Episode 7
2015	Yōgi-sha wa 8-ri no Ninki Geinin	Kannushi	Fuji TV	

=== Films ===
Year	Title	Role	Notes
2014	Liquid	Shuji, Yukio	Lead role; Also written and directed

=== Video games ===
Title	Role
Shinjuku no Ōkami	Spike

=== Dubbing ===
Year	Title	Role	Notes
2025	A Minecraft Movie	General Chungus	

== Solo shows ==
Year	Title
2008	Special Punkish Garden Eiko Kano First Live: Ciel

== Discography ==
=== Singles ===
Year	Title
2008	"Yōkoso! Ikemen Paradise"
2008	"Love Hurricane"

=== Participation ===
Year	Title
2009	"Kaze ni naritai"
2012	"Hana wa Saku"

=== DVD ===
Year	Title
2008	Eiko Kano no Umaretsuki Ikemen desu
2008	Nishiguchi DX Prowrestling –Soshite Hajimari no Chime– Megaton 1
2008	Eiko Kano First Live: Ciel
2008	Warau Inu 2008 Aki DVD-Box

=== As 50TA ===
==== Best albums ====
Year	Title	Ref.
2010	50TA	
