= Kiyotaka Nanbara =

Japanese television host and comedian (born 1965)

- Born: 13 February 1965 (age 61); Takamatsu, Kagawa, Japan
- Occupation: Comedian
- Years active: 1985–present
- Agent: Maseki Geinosha

Kiyotaka Nanbara (南原 清隆, Nanbara Kiyotaka) (born 13 February 1965, in Takamatsu, Kagawa Prefecture) is a Japanese television host and comedian. He is known as the boke of the manzai duo Ucchan Nanchan with Teruyoshi Uchimura.

== Early life ==
In 1985, he met Teruyoshi Uchimura while he was at Yokohama Broadcasting Technical School. He was also in the same class as Tetsurō Degawa and Masato Irie, and is part of the so–called "Third Generation of Comedians.

== Career ==
=== Career as a comedian ===
Nanbara united in class with Uchimura as a manzai duo by recommendation of his teachers Keiko Utsumi and Yoshie Utsumi (who performed as the unit "Keiko and Yoshie Utsumi"). They appeared on The Birth of a Comedian! and attracted attention to themselves.

The next year they won the competition and received the "New Duo" award.

By 1988, they had their first program.

In 1992 Utchan Nanchan won the Japanese Academy Award for "Best New Actors" for their role in the movie Cult Seven (七人のおたく).

In 1999 they crossed the English Channel on their TV show, Utchan Nanchan's Urinari.

In the 2003, 2004, 2006, and 2010 editions of the "M-1 Grand Prix," he served as a judge in the final round as a representative of the Third Generation of Comedians.

=== Career as a host ===
On the 1998 television program The Real Side of Un'nan (in the episode broadcast on October 28, 1998 on TBS Television), personalities claiming to have experienced the Mariko Aoki phenomenon — including Nanbara, Maako Kido, Seiko Ito and Keisuke Horibe – carried out extensive tests that also featured experts. There was a big response to this broadcast, and the program featured special segments related to this topic on multiple occasions thereafter (such as in the episode broadcast on January 20, 1999).

From 1998 to current day, Nanbara works as a host to the Asahi TV sports show Get Sports, along with former football player Tetsuo Nakanishi.

=== Career as a sports reporter and commentator ===
Nanbara had his first job as host in the puroresu and mixed martial arts variety show Ring Soul, which lasted from April 1994 to March 2000 in Asahi TV. He initially formed a host duo with Ken Ishiguro, but had to continue the show's tenure alone due to Ishiguro's movie schedule. His popularly in Ring Soul granted him special guest appearances in the All Japan Pro Wrestling Relay show and the game show Cult Q, where he introduced puroresu-themed quizzes. Nanbara has been active as a reporter since starting as a special correspondent for the Asahi Shimbun, and in 2004 he was also a special correspondent for the TV Asahi Athens Olympics, and joined the Tokyo Sports Press Club.

=== Acting career ===
Since 2003, he has been expanding his range of activities by challenging classical performing arts rakugo and, since 2006. kyōgen.

=== Musical career ===
He was a member of the group Black Biscuits, a unit formed in the program Ucchan Nanchan no Urinari, performing during the airing of the program, and as a special performance in the 49th (1998) and 74th (2023) Kōhaku Uta Gassen.

In 2001 he led the comedy musical group Happa-tai, whose song "Yatta" became an internet meme. After releasing the song, Nanbara became a member of Japanese musical group Memory Cats.

== Personal life ==
He announced his marriage in 1993. On March 22, 2005, he announced the birth of a child, a boy.

== Filmography ==
=== Television ===
==== Variety programs ====
- Ucchan Nanchan no Urinari!! (1996–2002) with Uchimura
- NTV Quiz Festival 2026 (NTV, 2026) MC, with Kazunari Ninomiya

== Discography ==
As Black Biscuits
Singles

- Stamina (1997)
- Timing (1998)
- Relax (1999)

Albums

- Life (1999)

== Books ==
- Kiyotaka Nanbara's Ring Soul: The allure of professional wrestling and martial arts unfolds in all its glory. (ISBN 978-4-334-97265-3)
