= Bakarhythm =

Japanese comedian, narrator, actor, playwright and lyricist

- バカリズム
- Born: Hidetomo Masuno; November 28, 1975 (age 50); Tagawa, Fukuoka Prefecture, Japan
- Other name: Bakarhythm Masuno
- Education: Japan Institute of the Moving Image
- Occupations: Comedian, narrator, actor, screenwriter, author, playwright, lyricist
- Years active: 1995-present
- Agent: Maseki Geinosha
- Height: 165 cm (5 ft 5 in)
- Spouse: Nemu Yumemi (m. 2019)
- Website: Official profile

Notes
- Same year/generation as: Shinagawa Shoji; Ogi Yahagi

Hidetomo Masuno (升野 英知, Masuno Hidetomo; born November 28, 1975, in Tagawa, Fukuoka Prefecture, Japan), better known for his stage name Bakarhythm (バカリズム, Bakarizumu), is a Japanese comedian, narrator, actor, playwright, and lyricist. He is sometimes called Bakarhythm Masuno (バカリズム 升野, Bakarizumu Masuno).

== Career ==
In 1995, while studying at the Japan Institute of the Moving Image, Masuno formed the comedy duo known as Bakarhythm with Toshihiro Matsushita. For the next 10 years, the duo had some success and appeared on a number of television variety and programs. In 2005, Matsushita decided to retire from the entertainment industry and the unit disbanded in November of that same year. Masuno decided to continue the activities of Bakarhythm by himself and took on the name as a solo comedian.

In 2006, just three months after the going solo, Bakarhythm became a finalist at the R-1 Grand Prix, the most prevalent televised comedy competition for solo performers. His flip board neta was a huge hit and landed him 4th place at the finals as well as propelling him to major success there afterward with the neta being featured in many commercials. However, Bakarhythm feared that the overuse of the same joke and gag may potentially lead to him becoming a one-hit wonder, and promptly stopped performing the flip board neta just one year after its initial break to popularity. He continued to appear on the R-1 Grand Prix consecutively for five years afterwards and was a finalist in four of the five years, and changing his performance with new material every time he entered. His neta, "Baka the Geography Teacher" scored a perfect 100 points at the 2009 R-1 Grand Prix, the first in the competition's history.

Bakarhythm began activities as a creator and screenwriter in 2012 with various television and comedy works. In 2014, he began activities as a screenwriter for serial TV dramas for the first time with Sutekinasen Taxi while appearing as an actor at the same time. Bakarhythm's career as a screenwriter then flourished as he was in charge of the script and screenwriting for prime time television dramas such as Kamoshiranai Joyu-tachi, Sakurazakabe Monogatari, the 2016 drama version of Ten Dark Women, Sumu Sumu (In which he also starred in), and Kaku OL Nikki (Also its original creator and lead actor). Bakarhythm won the Galaxy Award and the Kuniko Mukoda Award for Kaku OL Nikki in 2017.

In 2014, he appeared wearing a fake long nose and blonde wig in a controversial whiteface commercial for All Nippon Airways. In 2015, he appeared in almost all advertising for Super Mario Maker and designed a level that is playable in the game.

In December 2019, Bakarhythm married former idol and member of Denpagumi.inc, Nemu Yumemi.

== Filmography ==
=== TV programmes ===
==== Current ====
Year	Title	Network	Notes
2007	Bit World	NHK E TV	
2012	Ariyoshi Hanseikai	NTV	
2013	Mō! Bakarhythm-san no Do-H!	Fuji TV One	MC
2015	Buzz Rhythm 02	NTV	MC
2016	Iisupo!	Fuji TV One	MC
2017	Bakarhythm's 30 Minute Fun Cut Kikō	BS TV Tokyo	MC

==== Former ====
Year	Title	Network	Notes	References
	Warai ga Ichiban	NHK General		
	Himitsu no Arashi-chan!	TBS		
	R-1 Grand Prix			
	Bakushō Dai Nihon Akan Keisatsu	Fuji TV		
	Bakushō Red Theater	Fuji TV		
	You Knock on a Jumping Door!	Fuji TV		
	Hitoshi Matsumoto no Suberanai Hanashi Spin-off	Fuji TV Two		
	Hitoshi Matsumoto no Marumaru na Hanashi	Fuji TV		
	Fuji San	Fuji TV		
	Waratte Iitomo!	Fuji TV		
	Cream Nantoka	TV Asahi		
	Address Na! Garage	TV Asahi		
	Ikinari! Kogane Densetsu	TV Asahi		
	Tora no Mon	TV Asahi	Quasi-regular	
	Shoko Rīta	TV Tokyo		
	Sengoku Nabe TV: Nantonaku Rekishi ga Manaberu Eizō	Kanagawa TV, Chiba TV, Saitama, Sun TV		
	Bakarhythm Live: Bangai-hen Bakarhythm-an	Fuji TV One		
2006	All-Star Thanksgiving	TBS		
2006	Idoling!!!	Fuji TV One Two Next	MC	
2007	Idoling!!! Nikki	Fuji TV, Fuji TV One	MC	
2007	Owarai Dynamite!	TBS		
2008	Bakarhythm Live: Kagaku no Shinpo	Fuji TV Two, Fuji TV Next		
2008	Bakarhythm Live: Yūsha no Bōken	Fuji TV Two, Fuji TV Next		
2008	Jagaimon	TV Asahi		
2008	Shiru Shiru Mishiru	TV Asahi		
2009	Bakarhythm Man Tai Kaijin Bose	TV Tokyo, E Ne!	Lead role	
	Bakushō Red Carpet	Fuji TV		
2010	Oshōgatsu Kara Warai o Tore Shinshun Iromonea SP!	TBS		
2010	Bakarhythm Live: Quiz	Fuji TV Next		
2010	White Board TV	Tokyo MX		
2010	Quiz Tarento Meikan	TBS		
2010	Homerarete Nobiru-kun	Fuji TV		
2010	Bara Kore	TV Asahi	MC	
2011	Bakumon Powerful Face!	TBS		
2011	Hey! Hey! Hey! Music Champ			
2011	Kira Kira Afro	TV Osaka		
2011	Tabe Kore	TV Tokyo		
2011	Ultra Zone	TVK		
2012	Bakarhythm The Movie	Tokyo MX		
2012	Sōdan Baka Ichidai	TV Tokyo		
2012	Where is Nogizaka?	TV Tokyo		
2012	Blamayo to Yukaina Nakama-tachi Atsuatsu!			
2012	Nichiyō×Geinin	TV Asahi		
2012	Quiz Present Variety Q-sama!!	TV Asahi		
2012	Strike TV	TV Asahi		
2012	Early Chaplin	TBS		
2012	Zakkuri Highball	TV Tokyo		
2012	Guest to Guest	TV Asahi		
2012	Ariyoshi Japon	TBS		
2012	The Words Make the World	Fuji TV		
2013	Nakai Masahiro no Ayashii Uwasa no Atsumaru Toshokan	TV Asahi		
2013	Tsutaete Pikatchi	NHK General		
2013	Bakarhythm Goikkō-sama	TV Asahi		
2013	VS Arashi	Fuji TV		
2013	Boku-ra no Jidai	Fuji TV		
2013	Sekai Itte Mitara Honto wa Konna Toko Datta!?	Fuji TV		
2013	Tsurube no Sujinashi!	CBC, TBS		
2013	FNS 27-jikan TV Joshiryoku Zenkai 2013 Otome no Egao ga Ashita o Tsukuru!!	Fuji TV		
2013	Kiss My Fake	TBS		
2013	OV Kantoku	Fuji TV		
2014	Sonna Bakana Man	Fuji TV		
2014	Zettai Shōsha	NHK General		
2014	SMAP×SMAP	Fuji TV		
2014	Switch Interview: Tatsujin-tachi	NHK E TV		
2015	London Hearts	TV Asahi		
2015	Kanjani Eight Hakubutsukan	TBS		
2015	Chō Shiritoreal	TV Tokyo	MC	

=== Drama ===
Year	Title	Actor	Writer	Role	Notes	Ref.
2009	Otomen	Yes	No		Episode 2	
2011	Unidentified Fantastic Idol	Yes	No	Masuno		
2012	Urero Mikansei Sh?jo	Yes	Yes	Masuno		
2012	Watashi to Kare to Oshaberi Kuruma	Yes	No	Yusaku Tadokoro		
2012	Going My Home	Yes	No	Satoru Kobayashi		
2012	Hana no Zubora-Meshi	Yes	No	Goro-san (Voice)		
2013	Real Dasshutsu Game TV	Yes	No	Nazootoko	Lead role	
2013	Nazotoki wa Dinner no Ato de Special: Kazamatsuri-keibu no Jiken-bo	Yes	No	Kaoru Sato		
2014	Urero Mitaiken Sh?jo	Yes	Yes	Masuno		
2014	Oyaji no Senaka	Yes	No	Okuzumi	Episode 1	
2014	Time Taxi	Yes	Yes	Hiroshi Sakota		
2015	Y?gi-sha wa 8-nin no Ninki Geinin	Yes	No	Principal		
2015	Kamo Shirenai Joy?-tachi	Yes	Yes	Bakarhythm		
2020	The Road to Murder	Yes	Yes	Mitsuru Agatsuma	Lead role	
2023	Rebooting	Yes	Yes	Receptionist		
2025	The Hot Spot	No	Yes			
2027	Mawaru Swan		Yes		Asadora	

=== Films ===
Year	Title	Actor	Director	Writer	Role	Notes	Ref.
2012	Paper Rabbit Rope	Yes	No	No	Kaito Devil Cat's Boss Cat (voice)		
2012	Bakarhythm The Movie	Yes	Yes	Yes		Lead role	
2013	Goddotan	Yes	No	No			
2014	Team Batista the Movie: The Portrait of Kerberos	Yes	No	No	Kinnosuke Watanabe		
2014	Ushijima the Loan Shark Part 2	Yes	No	No	Shimomura		
2019	Tiger: My Life as a Cat	Yes	No	No			
2020	Stand by Me Doraemon 2	Yes	No	No	Nakameguro (voice)		
2020	Fictitious Girl's Diary	Yes	No	Yes		Lead role	
2021	Jigoku no Hanazono: Office Royale	Yes	No	Yes		Cameo appearance	
2021	The Road to Murder: The Movie	Yes	No	Yes	Mitsuru Agatsuma	Lead role	
2021	Wedding High	No	No	Yes			
2023	Refugee X	Yes	No	No	Yūichi Tsukimura		
2024	Shinnyuushatachi no Bansan	No	No	Yes			
2025	Beethoven Fabrication		No	No	Yes		

=== Japanese dub ===
Year	Title	Role	Dub for	Notes	Ref.
2012	The Hunger Games	Seneca Crane	Wes Bentley		
