= Wild Tripper!! =

Japanese Prime Video Travel documentary series

Japanese name
- Kanji: ワイルドトリッパー‼︎
Transcriptions
- Revised Hepburn: Wairudo Torippā!
- Genre: Reality television; Travel documentary
- Directed by: Hiroki Kayo
- Starring: Yugo Kochi; Shigeyuki Totsugi
- Opening theme: "Born to Ride" by Rex Banner
- Country of origin: Japan
- Original language: Japanese
- No. of seasons: 2
- No. of episodes: 20

Production
- Executive producer: Kota Shimamoto
- Producer: Kaori Nagata
- Production location: Japan
- Running time: 40-50 minutes
- Production companies: TAMA STAGE; Storm Labels Inc.

Original release
- Network: Prime Video
- Release: April 10, 2025 – July 31, 2026

Wild Tripper!! (Japanese: ワイルドトリッパー‼︎, Hepburn: Wairudo Torippā!) is a Japanese reality travel documentary series distributed by Amazon Prime Video Japan. The series premiered in April 2025 and features Yugo Kochi, a member of the idol group SixTones, alongside actor Shigeyuki Totsugi of TEAM NACS. The program combines unscripted travel, outdoor survival elements, and endurance based missions set in remote regions of Japan. A second season premiered on July 3, 2026.

== Overview ==
Wild Tripper!! follows Yugo Kochi as he undertakes physically and mentally demanding journeys through natural environments across Japan. Kochi, who holds certification as a camping instructor, is placed in unfamiliar and often harsh conditions designed to test adaptability, resilience, and teamwork. The journeys are structured around missions with strict limitations on equipment, budget, and preparation.

Shigeyuki Totsugi participates as the program's planner and guide, designing routes and challenge conditions intended to push the participants beyond their comfort zones.

== Format ==
Wild Tripper!! is structured as an unscripted travel and endurance program in which the main participant, Yugo Kochi, undertakes long-distance journeys through designated regions of Japan while completing mission based objectives. Each journey is planned in advance by Shigeyuki Totsugi, who determines the route, rules, and challenge conditions.

The format places strict limitations on resources, including restrictions on equipment, budget, transportation options, and preparation time. Participants are often required to travel on foot or by public transportation and to adapt their plans in response to environmental conditions such as weather, terrain, and physical fatigue. Missions may include survival oriented tasks, location based challenges, or completion of predefined objectives within set timeframes.

Junior entertainers accompanying Kochi join the journey for specific segments rather than the entire route. Their participation varies by episode and location, creating rotating group dynamics and differing levels of experience within each challenge. Interaction among participants, including decision making under pressure and cooperation during physically demanding situations, forms a core component of the program's narrative.

Episodes are edited to emphasize real time problem solving, logistical setbacks, and personal endurance rather than competitive scoring or elimination. The program does not employ a winner-loser structure; instead, progress is measured by the successful completion of missions and the ability to continue the journey under imposed constraints. Commentary by Totsugi provides context for the challenges and explains the intent behind specific rules or route selections.

== Cast ==
=== Main ===
- Yugo Kochi
- Shigeyuki Totsugi

=== Supporting ===
- Rinne Sugeta
- Waku Motoki
- Tatsuru Matsuo
- Fuga Onishi
- Takeyuki Mayumi
- Kuto Chiino
- Masato Takemura

== Episodes ==
=== Season 1 ===
The first season is set primarily in Hokkaido, Japan's northernmost main island. Filming took place across multiple locations known for severe weather and challenging geography. Episodes depict snow camping, long-distance travel between rural areas, and mission based objectives such as completing location based challenges under time and resource constraints.

| No. overall | No. in season | Location | Cast | Original release date | Ref. |
|---|---|---|---|---|---|
| 1 | 1 | Nemuro | Yugo Kochi, Rinne Sugeta, Kuto Chiino | 10 April 2025 | |
Yugo Kochi's role as the "Wild Tripper" and Shigeyuki Totsugi's role as the "Wild Planner" are introduced through their first meeting and discussion about the journey. Kochi begins the trip with Rinne Sugeta and Kuto Chiino, who are dropped off at an undisclosed location in Hokkaido and receive their first mission created by Totsugi. Given a travel budget determined by a specific condition, the trio attempts to identify their location, gather information from locals, and begin their journey through hitchhiking. Unexpected challenges arise as they adapt to the rules of the trip.
| 2 | 2 | Nemuro | Yugo Kochi, Rinne Sugeta, Kuto Chiino | 17 April 2025 | |
Yugo Kochi, Rinne Sugeta, and Kuto Chiino attempt to reach Rausu Fishing Port to meet an acquaintance of Shigeyuki Totsugi. After hitchhiking, however, they unexpectedly arrive at a location far from their destination. With no one nearby to ask for assistance, the trio uses part of their limited budget to purchase an hour-long ride bus. As night falls, they eventually reach Totsugi's acquaintance and continue their missions with support from local residents. Facing the challenge of finding a place to stay overnight with limited funds and equipment, they must decide how to spend the night.
| 3 | 3 | Nemuro→Kushiro | Yugo Kochi, Rinne Sugeta, Kuto Chiino → Waku Motoki, Tatsuru Matsuo | 1 May 2025 | |
After completing Mission Bingo in Nemuro, Yugo Kochi, Rinne Sugeta, and Kuto Chiino remain in the area in an attempt to complete the remaining missions and achieve a double bingo. They visit a location to recover after spending the night in a tent in freezing conditions before continuing their journey. The trip then moves to the Kushiro area, where Kochi is joined by Waku Motoki and Tatsuru Matsuo. Starting from a difficult situation, the trio takes on a new mission created by Shigeyuki Totsugi while navigating the snow-covered region with help from local residents.
| 4 | 4 | Kushiro | Yugo Kochi, Waku Motoki, Tatsuru Matsuo | 15 May 2025 | |
Yugo Kochi, Waku Motoki, and Tatsuru Matsuo obtain freshly squeezed milk and visit a local supermarket to purchase supplies for making cheese during their journey. While shopping for food and camping necessities, they discover an unexpected item that leads to a disagreement among the three. Later, Kochi attempts to reach a hot spring known for its view of swans by hitchhiking, but uses the "Golden Whistle" given to him by Shigeyuki Totsugi when time becomes limited. The whistle's use affects the direction of their remaining journey through Hokkaido.
| 5 | 5 | Kushiro | Yugo Kochi, Waku Motoki, Tatsuru Matsuo | 29 May 2025 | |
After visiting a hot spring with a view of swans, Yugo Kochi, Waku Motoki, and Tatsuru Matsuo continue their journey and search for a campsite they had previously noticed. The trio attempts to secure a campsite without a reservation while dealing with hunger and a limited budget. Forced to choose between purchasing camping equipment or having a proper meal, they decide how to manage their remaining resources. The next morning, after overcoming the challenges of the previous day, Waku and Tatsuru surprise Kochi with a proposal before they begin their cheese-making mission.
| 6 | 6 | Tokachi | Yugo Kochi, Rinne Sugeta, Takeyuki Mayumi | 12 June 2025 | |
Following his SixTONES dome tour appearance in Sapporo, Yugo Kochi travels to the Tokachi region for the next leg of the journey with Rinne Sugeta and Takeyuki Mayumi. For the first time in the series, the trio attempts to complete a bingo within a single day. After being dropped off at an undisclosed location, they begin their journey using hitchhiking, along with buses and trains. Kochi takes a more active role after learning hitchhiking techniques from a previous trip, while mistakes by Sugeta and Mayumi create challenges for the group. With limited time remaining, the trio works to complete their bingo missions across Tokachi.
| 7 | 7 | Tokachi→Kamikawa | Yugo Kochi, Rinne Sugeta, Takeyuki Mayumi → Fuga Onishi, Masato Takemura | 26 June 2025 | |
After receiving a bingo bonus prepared by Shigeyuki Totsugi, Yugo Kochi, Rinne Sugeta, and Takeyuki Mayumi enjoy a venison barbecue. With only about two hours remaining in their day trip, the trio splits up to complete separate missions in an attempt to finish the bingo. Facing the possibility of the first failed bingo in the series, they race against time to complete the remaining tasks, while Fuga Onishi and Masato Takemura await the outcome of the challenge. Meanwhile, a studio discussion about the person they would most like to meet reveals a different side of Totsugi.
| 8 | 8 | Kamikawa | Yugo Kochi, Fuga Onishi, Masato Takemura | 10 July 2025 | |
The Kamikawa leg begins with Yugo Kochi, Fuga Onishi, and Masato Takemura quickly completing their first mission. While waiting for their next bus to the Blue Pond and White Waterfall, the trio explores the surrounding area and attempts to help a local resident. An unexpected encounter leads to further developments during their journey. Despite their successful start, Kochi makes a sudden decision while traveling by bus, leaving Onishi and Takemura surprised as the group is taken to an unexpected destination.
| 9 | 9 | Kamikawa | Yugo Kochi, Fuga Onishi, Masato Takemura | 24 July 2025 | |
After completing the bingo on the first day, Yugo Kochi, Fuga Onishi, and Masato Takemura attempt to become the first team in the series to achieve four bingos by splitting up to complete additional missions. Onishi searches for the "Earth Sauna," leading him to a snow-covered mountain where he takes on a challenging mission. Meanwhile, Kochi and Takemura travel to Furano to find the "center of Hokkaido," with Takemura attempting hitchhiking on his own for the first time under Kochi's guidance. An unexpected situation causes Takemura to struggle during the challenge.
| 10 | 10 | Sorachi→Ishikari | Yugo Kochi, Shigeyuki Totsugi | 7 August 2025 | |
In the final area of Sorachi and Ishikari, Yugo Kochi and Shigeyuki Totsugi take on a Mission Bingo created by the Junior members. After discovering their starting location in the Sorachi area, the pair begins by attempting the mission "Fly in the sky over Sorachi." Totsugi experiences the difficulties of hitchhiking as they continue their journey toward the final destination of Sapporo. There, they attempt the unprecedented mission of appearing on a live television broadcast while managing limited time, money, and communication options.

=== Season 2 ===
Season 2 expands the scope of the series from Hokkaido to the Kyushu region, covering all seven prefectures. The planned route begins in Kagoshima and concludes in Nagasaki, spanning a total distance of more than 1,000 kilometers. The missions for Season 2 are designed to be more demanding than those of the first season, featuring longer travel segments and revised challenge rules.

| No. overall | No. in season | Location | Cast | Original release date | Ref. |
|---|---|---|---|---|---|
| 11 | 1 | Kagoshima | Yugo Kochi, Waku Motoki, Fuga Onishi | 3 July 2026 | |
Season 2 begins in the southernmost town of Kagoshima Prefecture, where Yugo Kochi, Waku Motoki, and Fuga Onishi begin their journey after removing their blindfolds. As they search for transportation to their first mission, an unexpected complication forces them to reconsider their plans. With little knowledge of Kagoshima's geography and missions spread across the prefecture, the trio struggles to decide where to begin.
| 12 | 2 | Kagoshima | Yugo Kochi, Waku Motoki, Fuga Onishi | 3 July 2026 | |
After unexpectedly completing a mission, Yugo Kochi, Waku Motoki, and Fuga Onishi continue their journey despite the late hour. They search for a daikon radish with a diameter of at least 30 centimeters, gathering information at a roadside station in Tarumizu. After a misunderstanding about their progress, the trio learns that the required daikon can be found on Sakurajima and travels there by hitchhiking. Following another encounter on the island after nightfall, their overnight stay takes an unexpected direction.
| 13 | 3 | Kagoshima→Miyazaki | Yugo Kochi, Waku Motoki, Fuga Onishi → Rinne Sugeta, Tatsuru Matsuo | 10 July 2026 | |
Yugo Kochi, Waku Motoki, and Fuga Onishi begin their final mission of reaching the Kagoshima–Miyazaki prefectural border. After identifying the approximate location of the border marker, the trio travels toward Miyazaki by hitchhiking and transfers between multiple vehicles. Upon reaching the area where the marker is believed to be located, they are unable to find it and continue searching along a mountain road. As the first filming session ends, a new Season 2 rule is introduced, with a "Save Point" flag placed at their final location to mark where the journey will resume. Nine days later, Rinne Sugeta and Tatsuru Matsuo arrive at the Save Point to continue the mission.
| 14 | 4 | Miyazaki | Yugo Kochi, Rinne Sugeta, Tatsuru Matsuo | 10 July 2026 | |
Yugo Kochi, Rinne Sugeta, and Tatsuru Matsuo travel to a roadside station in Miyazaki Prefecture to gather information for their journey. After struggling to find transportation, they receive assistance from a couple who drives them to their first mission at Ebino Plateau. Upon learning that visiting the crater lakes would require several hours, the trio faces unexpected difficulties that test their endurance. While searching for a place to stay overnight, Kochi proposes setting up their tent outside a campsite. With help from local residents, they prepare a Miyazaki specialty and spend the night before continuing their mission the following day.
| 15 | 5 | Miyazaki | Yugo Kochi, Rinne Sugeta, Tatsuru Matsuo | 17 July 2026 | |
On the second day of their Miyazaki mission, Yugo Kochi, Rinne Sugeta, and Tatsuru Matsuo learn that they must travel to Shiiba Village, one of Japan's three major secluded regions. Beginning their journey on a freezing morning, the trio starts hitchhiking toward Hyuga City, the gateway to Shiiba Village, which requires traveling over 100 km. After receiving warnings from local residents about the difficulty of reaching their destination, they continue with the help of people they encounter along the way. As they approach Shiiba Village, they face a steep mountain road that creates another challenge for the team.
| 16 | 6 | Miyazaki→Kumamoto | Yugo Kochi, Takeyuki Mayumi, Masato Takemura | 17 July 2026 | |
Seventeen days after the previous filming session, Yugo Kochi returns to the Save Point with Takeyuki Mayumi and Masato Takemura. After learning their location, Mayumi and Takemura discover that the Miyazaki Bingo mission remains incomplete. To continue their goal of clearing all seven Kyushu prefectures within the season, the trio attempts to complete the remaining Miyazaki mission at Manai Falls before moving on to Kumamoto. During their hitchhiking journey, they experience an unexpected encounter that surprises Kochi. After entering the Kumamoto area, they search for their next mission at a roadside station in Minamiaso, where Mayumi's actions lead to an unexpected incident.
| 17 | 7 | Kumamoto | Yugo Kochi, Takeyuki Mayumi, Masato Takemura | 24 July 2026 | |
Following the Chateaubriand incident, Yugo Kochi, Takeyuki Mayumi, and Masato Takemura face a significant reduction in their remaining budget during the Kumamoto mission. As night approaches, they search for a place to stay after failing to find assistance at the closed roadside station in Minamiaso. While Mayumi searches the surrounding area and Kochi and Takemura ask nearby residents for help, they struggle to find accommodation until an unexpected opportunity arises. The next morning, the trio works toward completing the Kumamoto Bingo by searching for 100 Kumamon statues and visiting the Okoshiki Coast at low tide. With help from local residents, they continue their mission while Mayumi and Takemura secretly prepare a plan.
| 18 | 8 | Kumamoto→Oita | Yugo Kochi, Takeyuki Mayumi, Masato Takemura → Kuto Chiino | 24 July 2026 | |
With only one square remaining on the Kumamoto Bingo card, Yugo Kochi, Takeyuki Mayumi, and Masato Takemura continue searching for Kumamon while making their way toward Kumamoto Airport. After receiving a ride toward the airport, the trio stops for a meal, where Mayumi and Takemura reveal a surprise mission for Kochi. They continue working on the challenge until the end of filming and place a Save Point to pass the journey to the next team. On the final day, Kochi is joined by Kuto Chiino and Takemura as they continue the mission to complete all seven prefectures of Kyushu, facing challenges from the new rule.
| 19 | 9 | Oita | Yugo Kochi, Masato Takemura, Kuto Chiino | 31 July 2026 | |
Yugo Kochi, Kuto Chiino, and Masato Takemura enter Oita Prefecture but have yet to complete a mission despite the late hour. They begin hitchhiking toward a cave sauna they have already identified as a destination and arrive before closing time. Realizing they still need to find a place to stay overnight, the trio decides to move to a larger town to improve their chances for the following day. After arriving at night and failing to find accommodation, they attempt to ask residents for permission to camp in their yards. With few people around and an unmanned station nearby, they prepare for the possibility of spending the night outdoors.
| 20 | 10 | Oita | Yugo Kochi, Masato Takemura, Kuto Chiino | 31 July 2026 | |
With two missions remaining on the Oita Bingo card, Yugo Kochi, Kuto Chiino, and Masato Takemura attempt to complete the tasks involving Fukashima Island and Prefectural Route 635. The trio learns that the ferry to Fukashima operates only three times a day and must reach Kamae Port, located approximately 60 km away, before the final departure. Despite difficulties finding transportation, Kochi's persistence helps them arrive at the port in time. For their remaining mission, the trio travels along Prefectural Route 635 using a rental car after entering the designated area. Kochi drives for the first time in the series as they race against the remaining filming time to complete the final challenge.

== Broadcast and distribution ==
The series is distributed exclusively through Amazon Prime Video Japan. The first season premiered on April 10, 2025, with episodes released on a biweekly schedule throughout the summer. The second season premiered on July 3, 2026, with two new episodes released every Friday throughout July 2026. All episodes are available on demand.
