= Tabi no Oto: Kamakura-hen =

Japanese travel drama series

- タビノオト ～鎌倉篇～
- Genre: Travel; Slice of life; Drama
- Screenplay by: Zuimaro Awashima
- Directed by: Yoshifumi Udo
- Starring: Yugo Kochi
- Country of origin: Japan
- Original language: Japanese
- No. of seasons: 1
- No. of episodes: 8

Production
- Producer: Jintsu Tsutomu
- Running time: 2 minutes
- Production company: MMJ

Original release
- Release: April 6 – April 30, 2026

Tabi no Oto: Kamakura-hen!! (タビノオト ～鎌倉篇～) is a 2026 Japanese travel drama broadcast on TRAIN TV, an in-train digital signage platform operated across major JR East lines in the Tokyo metropolitan area. The series stars Yugo Kochi and marks the first original travel drama produced for the platform.

== Synopsis ==
The story follows Hisashi Kawamoto (Yugo Kochi), a young man working at a publishing company in Tokyo, who decides to take a solo trip to Kamakura. During his stay, he encounters various people, including individuals he meets at a guesthouse and along the seaside. Through these experiences, he gradually reflects on himself. The narrative depicts a one-night, two-day trip and explores themes of personal change and growth.

In the first episode, Hisashi begins his journey after deciding to travel alone; after assisting a woman named Kazuko who has lost her way on Komachi Street, he continues his trip, leading to a series of encounters.

== Cast ==
=== Main ===
- Yugo Kochi as Hisashi Kawamoto

Fourth-year employee at a publishing company who becomes dissatisfied with his work and decides to take a solo trip to Kamakura.

=== Supporting ===
- Yorie Yamashita as Kazuko Shimomura

An elderly woman whom Hisashi meets after she becomes lost in a back alley off Komachi Street.

- Shodai Fukuyama as Daiki Okamoto

Young man sketching at Yuigahama Beach who surfs in the mornings and works at a nearby surf shop.

- Lucifer Yoshioka as Jien

The chief priest of Jōchi-ji Temple who offers reflective guidance to Hisashi.

- Natsu Fukui as Kanako Shiraishi

A traveler Hisashi meets at a guesthouse who takes monthly solo trips.

- Satoshi Jinbo as Kenji Okazaki

Café owner who opened his shop after retirement.

- Seiya Osada as Yuta Miura

Hisashi’s superior at work who shows concern for him.

== Broadcast ==
The series aired on TRAIN TV from April 6 to May 3, 2026, with new episodes released every Monday and Thursday. It was broadcast on in-train monitors across major JR East lines in the Tokyo metropolitan area. The platform covers multiple lines, including the Yamanote Line, Yokosuka Line and Sobu Rapid Line, Chuo Rapid Line, Keihin-Tohoku and Negishi Line, Keiyo Line, Saikyo and Rinkai Line, Yokohama Line, Nambu Line, Joban Line, Chuo-Sobu Line, and the Yurikamome Line.

== Streaming ==
Episodes were made available for catch-up streaming on the official TRAIN TV website after broadcast, beginning on April 9, 2026, with availability continuing through May 31, 2026.
