= Hidetsugu Shibata =

Japanese comedian (born 1975)

- 柴田 英嗣
- Born: 15 July 1975 (age 50); Shimizu-shi (now Shimizu-ku, Shizuoka), Shizuoka Prefecture, Japan
- Education: Tokai University School of Engineering
- Employer: Production Jinrikisha
- Partner: Hironari Yamazaki
- Website: Hidetsugu Shibata no Heion na Boku

Hidetsugu Shibata (柴田 英嗣, Shibata Hidetsugu; born 15 July 1975) is a Japanese comedian.

Shibata was born in Shimizu-ku, Shizuoka, Shizuoka Prefecture. He is a third grader at School JCA, a talent training school for Jinrikisha.

== Biography ==
- In 1994, he entered School JCA, a talent training school for Production Jinrikisha that aims for owarai geinin. He longed for Junji Takada, initially aiming for a "boke entertainer." After that, he formed a duo with JCA classmate Hironari Yamazaki, "Untouchable." Shibata is in charge of "tsukkomi."
- In December 2007, he was hospitalised for emergency with acute hepatitis and resumed performing arts activities in March of the following year.
- He closed his entertainment activities for one year from the end of January 2010.
- He later resumed entertainment activities in January 2011. He made his first television after his return on Bijo Athlete Sou Shutsuen: Honoo no Taiiku-kai TV–2011 (11 January 2011).
- From 2 April 2012, he served as the main personality of TBS Radio programme Linda! –Konya wa anata o nerai Uchi–, which became his first regular programme after returning.

== Style of acting ==
- Despite being from Shizuoka prefecture, there are times when it is said that he was an Edokko. Also, it was said that his kire tsukkomi in manzai was evaluated from Kansai manga artist Yasushi Yokoyama.
- Contrary to the artistic enthusiasm of his kire tsukkomi, there is a long-sided aspect that he could go to the zoo and watch animals such as hippopotamuses for as long as three hours.
- In the manzai, he shows movement like thrusting and ballooning laughing, a reaction in response to an escalated boke, which collapses on the spot, a high-tension kicking thrusting movement.
- Frequently he talks about knowledge gained from his zoo visits and illustrations from variety shows and his blog. His most favourite animal is hippopotamus and advocates the "Hippopotami Theory." In 2009 he made an emblem of a hippopotamus and added it to hiscar and was messed with Chicago Mango. After that, when Shibata consulted George Tokoro about the "production of hippopotamus emblem", Tokoro confirmed that "I will make it", and gave a free birthday hippo emblem to Shibata. The silvery shining emblem was also shown on radio and television programmes.

== Episodes ==
- In his elementary and junior high school years as a student, he belonged to the gymnastics and baseball clubs but during high school and belonged to the model department and made a model car.
- He started boxing when he was a child who was bullied in the past.
- He was good at overall exercise and had been scouted by a Youth Football club. When he was selected for a football selection in Shizuoka Prefecture, there was a boy with extraordinary dribble technique during practice. This led him lose his confidence, and had a period in his football life, but that boy was Makoto Tanaka, later part of the Japan national football team.
- He is a fans of the local football club Shimizu S-Pulse.
- In September 2005, he announced his marriage. Currently he is a father of two children.
  - They later divorced in May 2015.
- He received LASIK surgery in 2006 and 2012, in which his visual acuity recovered from 0.01 to 1.5.
- There was an exchange with the music group Ketsumeishi, whom he have participated as a staff on their live tour. During Shibata's private time, he formed a karaoke circle called "Shibameishi" with his junior entertainers.
- His radio programme Chicago Mango triggered a blog titled "Hidetsugu Shibata no Heion na Boku."
- He also started a personal name book on the radio programme Linda! –Konya wa anata o nerai Uchi–.

== Appearances ==
=== Television ===
Current regular appearances

- Ichioshi Dai Yosō TV: Uma kyun! (Jul 2013 –, BS Fuji) quasi-regular
- Kyary Pamyu Pamyu no: Nandakore TV (Nov 2013 –, Space Shower TV) – Nanzean Zentoikota (voice appearance)
- Ikitaga Rīno (19 Apr 2014 –, TSS) Saturdays, 18:30–19:00; also broadcast in eight overseas countries and regions (Thailand, Singapore, Sri Lanka, Vietnam, Mongolia, Indonesia, Myanmar, Taiwan)
- ShibaManbo (28 Jun 2015 –, Fuji TV One)
- Tokyo Audition (Kakari) (3 Nov 2015 –, Tokyo MX) – Moderator
- Joy no Asobu-TV Joynt! (GTV) occasional appearances
- Satahapi Shizoka (20 May 2016 –, SATV) quasi-regular
- Shi Ni Rei Rei Hachi Go Go (9 Jan 2017 –, SBS)

Former regular appearances

- S/mile Factory (26 Apr, 24 May, 28 Jun 2011, Space Shower TV) – Sumairu Otto (voice appearance)
- Next "Real Shizuoka Talk Variety: Bukkomi" (Jun 2011 – Jun 2013, SUT)
- Konya Nojuku ni narimashite (Jul–Dec 2012, TV Saitama, et al. 8 stations nationwide)
- Nuts Life (31 Dec 2014 – 28 Oct 2015, TX) – Billy (voice appearance)
- Gekkan Special (Jan–Mar, Aug 2015, Space Shower TV)
- Animal Mania (27 Jul 2015 – 28 Mar 2016, TVK)
- Shibata-kun no B Dash Game Dō (3 Jun – 30 Sep 2016, TX)
- Nobue Matsuhara: Enka Shokudō (1–22 Oct 2016, BS Nittele) – MC (as Enka Shokudō General)

Other appearances

- Ketsumeishi: Ikirutte subarashī (MTV Japan)
- Manten Papa-chans (NTV)
- Geinō-kai ka Gaku-bu (EX)
- Cartoon KAT-TUN (NTV)
- Gout Temps Nouveau (KTV)
- Ueda Channel (TeleAsa Channel)
- 24Hour Television: Love Saves the Earth (2009, NTV)
- Cream Nantoka (EX)
- King's Brunch (TBS)
- Jōnetsu! Happy Maker (EX)
- Utchari Sengen (SUT)
- King Sub (SUT)
- Elephant JoyToy (SUT)
- Tonneruzu no Minasan no Okage deshita (CX)
- Leader's How To Cook Joshima Site (EX)
- TV Lab "Semai Sekai Nanafushigi" (BS Fuji)
- Yarisugi Koji (TX) "Yarisugi Dōbutsu Baka," "Yarisugi Toshi Densetsu"
- School Kakumei! (NTV)
- Geinōjin Kodawari-ō Kōza: Iketaku (CX)
- Bijo Athlete Sou Shutsuen: Honoo no Taiiku-kai TV–2011 (TBS)
- Kasupe! "Karada no Fushigi Miracle TV" (CX)
- Kanzen Namahōsō! Mr. Magic Fukkatsu: Chō Majutsu 13 Renpatsu (NTV)
- Kiseki Getter: Bootbaaas!! (TBS)
- Geinin Kisha: Karada Atari Scoop SP (TBS)
- Bakushō Mondai Jayaranai Koto (BeeTV)
- Panada-sensei no Manaberu! Dōbutsuen (TX)
- Takajin No Money (TVO)
- TokYo, Boy (Tokyo MX)
- Uchimura Summers
- Ari×Nashi (TX)
- God Eye (CX)
- Goddotan (TX)
- 80's Kogane no Hero Retsuden (Family Gekijo)
- Shirokuro Unjash (CTC)
- Masahiro Nakai no Black Variety (NTV)
- Sunday Japon (TBS)
- Tokoro-san no Gakkōde wa Oshiete kurenai sokon Tokoro! (TX)
- Mezase! No.1 Moe Queen Moekyu (2012–, J:Com)
- Ametalk (EX)
- Nakai no Mado (NTV)
- Hiroikino (CX)
- Oi! Hiroikimura (CX)
- Hangeki (14 Oct 2014, CX)
- VS Arashi (23 Oct 2014, 16 Apr 2015, CX)
- Downtown Now (9 Oct 2015, CX)
- Ippon Grand Prix (2 Dec 2017, CX)

=== Radio ===
Regular appearances

- Linda! –Konya wa anata o nerai Uchi– (2 Apr 2012 – 28 Mar 2013, TBS Radio) – Personality
- Untouchable Shibata to Shiori Kamisaki no Īkagen, Otona ni nare yo'! (1 Apr – 24 Jun 2013, TBS Radio) – Personality
- Untouchable Shibata no Bingo! (1 Jul – 23 Sep 2013, TBS Radio) – Personality

Other appearances

- Koji Kato no Hoe Tamashī, Ogiyahagi no Megane Bīki (TBS Radio) "Bake Report"
- Junk: Kōryū-sen Special (TBS Radio)
- Ryota Yamasato no Fumōna Giron (TBS Radio)
- Bakushō Mondai no Nichiyō Sunday (TBS Radio)
- Nippon Hōsō Holiday Special Daimaou Kosaka no AsoNabi (NBS)
- Hikaru Ijūin: Shinya no Bakajikara (TBS Radio)
- Bakushō Mondai Car Boy (TBS Radio)

=== Internet ===
- Shibata-Takei no Mezase Hyakujū no Ō!! (Ameba Studio)
- Untouchable Shibata no Mote Otoko Kenkyūjo (Gorilla Clinic)
- Untouchable Shibata no Animal Chōsa-dan (15 Nov 2016 –, 360Channel – VR Sakuhin)
- Konya, Shakumei shimasu m(_ _)m Isha-ryō 1 Oku-en & 8 Mata Giwaku o Shakumei & Tsuikyū SP (30 Apr 2017, AbemaTV Abema Gold Channel)
- Presents! -DMM Online Salon (13 Sep 2017 –, Fresh! by CyberAgent)
- Untouchable Shibata no Animal Chōsa-dan: Second Season (14 Sep 2017 –, 360Channel – VR Sakuhin)

=== Dramas ===
- Getsuyō Golden Midorikawa Keibu vs. 33-Bu no Yūki (2012, TBS) – as Makoto Hanada

=== Direct-to-video works ===
- Mahjong Dragon Legend Tenpai: Genroku Taisen Battle History (2011)
- Mahjong Dragon Legend Tenpai: Mugen Hell Escape History (2012)

=== Dubbing ===
- The Nutty Professor (NTV version) – Reggie Warrington (Japanese dub)

=== Advertisements ===
- Infoseek – as Wrestler
- Car Convenience Club

== Discography ==
Singles

- Damatte Ore ni Tsuite Koi/Shibata no So She, So I (1 Feb 2016, Tokuma Japan Communications)
  - Limited Edition CD+DVD (TKCA-72990)
  - Normal Edition CD (TKCA-72995)
    Unit of Hidetsugu Shibata and Dojima Kohei, born during recording of the Nippon TV audition programme UtaSuta!!

== Applications ==
- iTunes application Untouchable Shibata no Yakamashī Dōbutsu Gacha

== Bibliography ==
=== Books ===
- Untouchable Hidetsugu Shibata no Nihon Ichi Yakamashī Dōbutsu Zukan (Kodansha, Jul 2009) – ISBN 978-4062155182
  Wrote and drawn episodes and illustrations of animals, episodes of entertainer fellows, etc.

=== Serialisations ===
- Untouchable Shibata no "Animal Life" (Tokyo Sports, Osaka Sports, Chukyo Sports every other Thursday, Kyushu Sports every other Friday, 2009)
- Anta Shibata no "Tonikaku ** ni Urusai yo!" (Tokyo Sports, Osaka Sports, Chukyo Sports, Kyushu Sports Feb 2011)
- Untouchable Shibata no Yasei Dōbutsu no Taoshikata (Takeshobo Top Yell, Tokusaku shinsengumiDX)
