= Omusubi (TV series) =

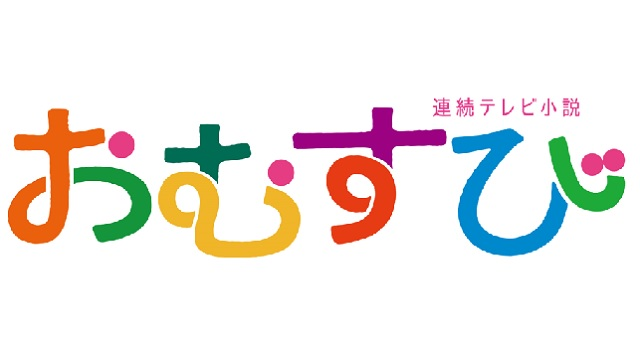
- Genre: Dorama
- Written by: Nonji Nemoto
- Directed by: Yūsuke Noda and others
- Starring: Kanna Hashimoto; Riisa Naka; Hayato Sano; Maika Yamamoto; Yuna Taira; Shinya Kote; Midoriko Kimura; Kumiko Aso; Yoshiko Miyazaki; Naoto Ogata; Yukiya Kitamura; Ken Matsudaira
- Narrated by: Lily Franky
- Opening theme: "Illumination" by B'z
- Composer: Hiroaki Tsutsumi
- Country of origin: Japan
- Original language: Japanese

Production
- Producer: Hiroshi Sugahara
- Running time: 15 minutes
- Production company: NHK Osaka

Original release
- Network: NHK
- Release: September 30, 2024 – March 28, 2025

Omusubi (Japanese: おむすび) is a Japanese television drama series and the 111th Asadora series, following The Tiger and Her Wings.

== Plot ==
Born in the first year of Heisei (1989), Yui Yoneda was influenced by the somewhat outdated Gyaru culture during her high school years. Despite her aspiration to become a nutritionist, she never forgets her Gyaru spirit and navigates through the Heisei era with determination.

== Cast ==
=== Yoneda family ===
- Kanna Hashimoto as Yui Yoneda. She experienced the Great Hanshin earthquake during her childhood and later moved to Fukuoka. Her nickname is Omusubi.
  - Ameri Isomura as young Yui
- Riisa Naka as Ayumi "Ayu" Yoneda, Yui's sister
  - Saki Takamatsu as young Ayumi
- Yukiya Kitamura as Masato Yoneda, Yui's father
- Kumiko Aso as Aiko Yoneda, Yui's mother
- Yoshiko Miyazaki as Kayo Yoneda, Yui's grandmother
- Ken Matsudaira as Eikichi Yoneda, Yui's grandfather. He is a big fan of the Fukuoka Daiei Hawks.
- Chise Niitsu as Hana Yoneda, Yui and Shoya's daughter
  - Ririsa Miyazaki as young Hana

=== Yotsugi family ===
- Hayato Sano as Shoya Yotsugi, Yui's husband
- Wakana Sakai as Sachiko Yotsugi, Shoya's mother
- Takaya Yamauchi as Takanori Yotsugi, Shoya's father

=== Yui's high school friends ===
- Araki Sugō as Yota Koga
- Leo Matsumoto as Ryosuke Kazami
- Shuri Nakamura as Emi Miyazaki

=== Hakata Gyaru union ===
- Mirichamu as Ruri "Lurie" Mashima
- Misaki Tanifuji as Tamako "Tamatchi" Sato
- Natsumi Okamoto as Suzune "Suzurin" Tanaka
- Meimi Tamura as Risa "Risapon" Yuzuki

=== People of Kobe ===
- Naoto Ogata as Takao Watanabe
- Miyu Oshima as Maki Watanabe, Takao's daughter
- Midoriko Kimura as Misae Sakuma
- Shin'ya Niiro as Takeo Wakabayashi
- Katsunori Uchiba as Yoshizo Takahashi
- Takashi Utsumi (Milk Boy) as Akira Ōsaki
- Hideaki Okajima as Yasuhiko Fukuda
- Rena Matsui as Mika "Chanmika" Aihara
- Shima Tabata as Natsumi Sakuma

=== Kobe Nutrition College ===
- Maika Yamamoto as Sachi Yabuki
- Yuna Taira as Kasumi Yugami
- Shinya Kote as Manabu Morikawa
- Saki Aibu as Machiko Sakuraba
- Long Mizuma as Jōji Ishiwatarari

=== People of Itoshima ===
- Shinnosuke Ikehata as Himiko
- Wataru Ichinose as Yuma Sasaki
- Shinobu Hasegawa (Sissonne) as Tamotsu Matsubara
- Yumi Wakatsuki as Ikumi Igarashi
- Haruka Kodama as Sayaka Kawai
- Akimasa Haraguchi as Seiya Kusano
- Goriken as Takeshi Koga
- Yu Saito (Parachute Butai) as Shinsuke Ōmura
- Kunihiro Suda as Kōhei Ide
- Butch as Kyōsuke izukaI
- Kenji Tanaka as a master of ceremonies
- Rio Teramoto as Asuka Ōkōchi

=== Hoshikawa Electric Baseball Club ===
- Mandy Sekiguchi as Ryuji Sawada
- Yasuhito Shimao as Shigeharu Nakamura, the team manager
- Hiroki Miyake as Shusaku Tatekawa, a nutritionist
- Riku Hagiwara as Naoya Haraguchi, a nutritionist
- Narumi as Ikuyo Okubo
- Ema Maeno as Akane Tanaka

=== Osaka Shin-Yodogawa Memorial Hospital ===
- Mari Hamada as Fumika Tsukamoto
- Fu Hinami as Miwa Kuwahara
- Atsuhiro Inukai as Satoshi Sugisawa
- Munenori Nagano as Eito Matsuzaki
- Nagiko Tsuji as Akari Shinomiya
- Kana Shimazui as Riko Kakinuma
- Takeaki Yoshida as Taku Ishida
- Tōru Baba as Naohisa Morishita
- Anne Nakamura as Reina Kamata
- Takuya Inoue as Haruya Inoue

=== Others ===
- Wataru Ichinose as Yuma Sasaki
- Kenshiro Kawanishi as Matsumoto, a sportswriter
- Norika Fujiwara as Sayuri Saijo
- Naomi Watanabe as Akipi
- Alice Hiyama as Marie Sone
- Keisuke Yamauchi as himself
- Ruy Ramos as himself
- Yumi Asō as Shigeko Mukai
- Gaku Hosokawa as Takahiro Maruo
- Miyu Oshima (Note: dual role) as Uta Tahara, a girl who closely resembles Maki

== Production ==
NHK offered the role of Yui, the heroine, to Kanna Hashimoto. However, as her schedule was already full with the London performances of the stage play Spirited Away and filming for the sequel of the Kingdom movie series, her agency initially planned to decline the offer. Nevertheless, NHK promised to make every effort to accommodate her existing commitments, and they eventually reached an agreement.

The supporting cast includes many actors and comedians with connections to Fukuoka.

== TV schedule ==
| Week | Episodes | Title | Directed by | Original airdate | Rating |
|---|---|---|---|---|---|
| 1 | 1–5 | "Omusubi to Gyaru" (おむすびとギャル) | Yūsuke Noda | September 30–October 4, 2024 | 16.1% |
| 2 | 6–10 | "Gyaru tte Nan nan?" (ギャルって何なん?) | Kensuke Matsuki | October 7–11, 2024 | 14.7% |
| 3 | 11–15 | "Yume tte Nan nan?" (夢って何なん?) | Yūsuke Noda | October 14–18, 2024 | 13.5% |
| 4 | 16–20 | "Uchi to Oneechan" (うちとお姉ちゃん) | Michi Ono | October 21–25, 2024 | 12.9% |
| 5 | 21–25 | "Ano Hi no Koto" (あの日のこと) | Kensuke Matsuki | October 28–November 1, 2024 | 14.2% |
| 6 | 26–30 | "Uchi, Gyaru, Yameruken" (うち、ギャル、やめるけん) | Michi Ono | November 4–8, 2024 | 13.6% |
| 7 | 31–35 | "Omusubi, Koi o Suru" (おむすび、恋をする) | Yūsuke Noda | November 11–15, 2024 | 13.9% |
| 8 | 36–40 | "Sayonara Itoshima Tadaima Kobe" (さよなら糸島 ただいま神戸) | Makoto Bonkobara | November 18–22, 2024 | 14.1% |
| 9 | 41–45 | "Sasaeru tte Nan nan?" (支えるって何なん?) | Yōhei Ōno | November 25–29, 2024 | 13.3% |
| 10 | 46–50 | "Hito Sorezore de Yoka" (人それぞれでよか) | Michi Ono | December 2–6, 2024 | 13.2% |
| 11 | 51–55 | "Shūshoku tte Nan nan?" (就職って何なん?) | Yōhei Ōno | December 9–13, 2024 | 13.4% |
| 12 | 56–60 | "Hataraku tte Nan nan?" (働くって何なん?) | Makoto Bonkobara | December 16–20, 2024 | 13.1% |
| 13 | 61–65 | "Shiawase tte Nan nan?" (幸せって何なん?) | Yūsuke Noda | December 23–27, 2024 | 12.7% |
| 14 | 66–70 | "Kekkon tte Nan nan?" (結婚って何なん?) | Hyoji Harada | January 6–10, 2025 | 12.9% |
| 15 | 71–75 | "Kore ga Uchi no Ikiru Michi" (これがうちの生きる道) | Takafumi Kudō | January 13–17, 2025 | 12.5% |
| 16 | 76–80 | "Warae, Gyarus" (笑え、ギャルズ) | Kensuke Matsuki | January 20–24, 2025 | 12.8% |
| 17 | 81–85 | "Restart" | Makoto Bonkobara | January 27–31, 2025 | 12.6% |
| 18 | 86–90 | "Omusubi, Kanri-eiyōshi ni Naru" (おむすび、管理栄養士になる) | Yūsuke Noda | February 3–7, 2025 | 12.6% |
| 19 | 91–95 | "Haha-oya tte Nan nan?" (母親って何なん?) | Hyoji Harada | February 10–14, 2025 | 12.4% |
| 20 | 96–100 | "Ikiru tte Nan nan?" (生きるって何なん?) | Kensuke Matsuki | February 17–21, 2025 | 12.3% |
| 21 | 101–105 | "Yoneda-ke no Noroi" (米田家の呪い) | Yūsuke Noda | February 24–28, 2025 | 12.0% |
| 22 | 106–110 | "Risō to Genjitsu tte Nan nan?" (理想と現実って何なん?) | Yōhei Ōno | March 3–7, 2025 | 12.3% |
| 23 | 111–115 | "Hanaretottemo Tsunagattōken" (離れとってもつながっとうけん) | Hyoji Harada | March 10–14, 2025 | 12.1% |
| 24 | 116–120 | "Kazoku tte Nan nan?" (家族って何なん?) | Michi Ono | March 17–21, 2025 | 11.9% |
| 25 | 121–125 | "Omusubi, Minna o Musubu" (おむすび、みんなを結ぶ) | Yūsuke Noda and Michi Ono | March 24–28, 2025 | 12.5% |
Average rating 13.1% - Rating is based on Japanese Video Research (Kantō region).

== Notes ==
| Preceded by The Tiger and Her Wings | Asadora; September 30, 2024 – March 28, 2025 | Succeeded by Anpan |
