= Hironari Yamazaki =

Japanese comedian (born 1976)

- 山崎 弘也
- Born: January 14, 1976 (age 50); Kasukabe, Saitama, Japan
- Other name: Zakiyama
- Occupation: Comedian
- Years active: 1995–Present
- Employer: Production Jinrikisha
- Partner: Hidetsugu Shibata
- Website: www.p-jinriki.com/talent/untouchable/

Hironari "Zakiyama" Yamazaki (山崎弘也, Yamazaki Hironari; born January 14, 1976) is a Japanese comedian.

== Career ==
Yamazaki was born in Kasukabe, Saitama. He formed the owarai kombi Untouchable (アンタッチャブル, Antatchaburu) with Hidetsugu Shibata in 1994 and became famous after winning the "M-1 Grand Prix" for manzai comedy in 2004. He has come to often appear alone on television and rarely appears together with Shibata, using the nickname "Zakiyama", especially after Shibata's bouts with health problems. He is a regular on many shows, including Nichiyō Geinin, which he hosts with Bakarhythm and Masayasu Wakabayashi.

Yamazaki is known to be a rowdy-type character and as a "troublemaker" and "mood-maker" as he often likes to go off script for additional comedic effects. He is also known for his imitations of other comedians, through exaggerations and adding in his own elements when performing their gags.

== Filmography ==
=== TV Programmes ===
==== Current ====
Year	Title	Network	Notes
2004	Quiz Presen Variety Q Sama!!	TV Asahi	
2014	School Revolution!	NTV	
2014	Zakyama House	ABC	MC
