= Tadao Sato =

Japanese film critic (1930–2022)

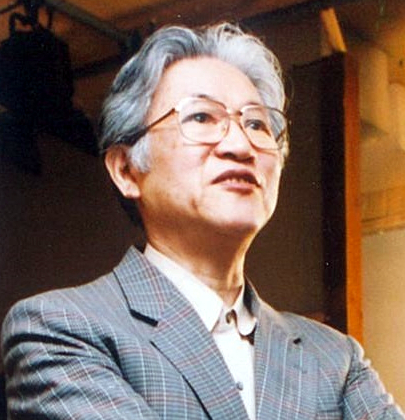
- Born: 6 October 1930; Niigata, Niigata Prefecture, Japan
- Died: 17 March 2022 (aged 91)
- Occupation: Film critic
- Employer(s): Japanese National Railways; Nippon Telegraph and Telephone Public Corporation; Japan Institute of the Moving Image
- Awards: Legion of Honour

Tadao Satō (Japanese: 佐藤 忠男, Hepburn: Satō Tadao; 6 October 1930 – 17 March 2022) was a Japanese film critic, theorist and historian. His real name was Tadao Iiri (飯利 忠男, Iiri Tadao).

== Overviews ==
Born in Niigata, Niigata Prefecture, Japan, He published more than a hundred books on film, and was one of Japan's foremost scholars and historians addressing film. He was recognized as one of the world's foremost authorities on Japanese cinema specifically, although little of his work had been translated for publication abroad. He also wrote books on Chinese, Korean, American and European films.

The international awareness of Sato's scholarship can be attributed to a collection of selected essays, Currents In Japanese Cinema, published internationally in English translation in 1982. His Kenji Mizoguchi and the Art of Japanese Cinema was published in Japanese in 1982 and translated in 2008. (Note: Sato, Tadao, (trans. Brij Tankha) Kenji Mizoguchi and the Art of Japanese cinema, Oxford; New York, NY : Berg, 2008. ISBN 1-84788-230-7.) Sato has also frequently appeared as a primary source in the writing of other Japanese film historians, notably Donald Richie and Joan Mellen.

He was the president of the Japan Institute of the Moving Image.
