= Maseki Geinosha =

Japanese talent agency

Maseki Geinosha Co., Ltd
- Native name: 株式会社マセキ芸能社
- Company type: Kabushiki gaisha (Joint-stock company)
- Traded as: Unlisted
- Industry: Service industry (entertainment)
- Genre: Tarento management, entertainment production
- Founded: November 24, 1950
- Headquarters: 3-24-3, Shiba, Minato, Tokyo 110-0015, Japan
- Area served: Japan
- Key people: Hideo Maseki (Representative chairman)
- Website: www.maseki.co.jp

Maseki Geinosha Co., Ltd (株式会社マセキ芸能社) is a Japanese talent agency headquartered in Minato, Tokyo. It was founded in 1950 and manages talents, with a main focus on comedians. The agency has produced numerous well known comedians such as Ucchan Nanchan and are considered one of the forefront agencies for comedians.

== Notable talents ==
=== Groups ===
- Ucchan Nanchan (Teruyoshi Uchimura, Kiyotaka Nanbara)
- Knights (Nobuyuki Hanawa, Nobuyuki Tsuchiya)
- Sanshiro (Hironobu Komiya, Shuji Aida)
- Par Par (Hoshino Disco, Ainapu)
- Kagaya (Sho Kaga, Soya Kaya)
- Nitche (Keiko Enoue, Kumiko Kondo)

=== Solo ===
- Tetsuro Degawa
- Bakarhythm
- Asako Ito
- Passion Yara
- Eiko Kano
- Shinji Maggy
