= Yatta (song) =

"Yatta!"

Single by Green Leaves
- Released: April 4, 2001
- Genre: J-pop; dance-pop; disco
- Length: 3:55
- Label: Pony Canyon
- Songwriter: Hideki Fujisawa

"Yatta!" (やった "Hooray") is a 2001 parody song by the fictional Japanese boy band Green Leaves (はっぱ隊, Happa-tai). The song title, yatta, is the past tense of the Japanese verb yaru ("to do"), an exclamation meaning "It's done!", "I did it!", "Ready!" or "All right!" The song and video have been used as a web culture in-joke on many different websites.

== History ==
The song was first performed as a sketch on the Japanese sketch comedy show Adventures of a Laughing Dog (笑う犬の冒険, Warau Inu no Bōken), known as Silly Go Lucky in the United States, where Happa-tai is portrayed by some of Japan's most well-known comedians. The song was written by Hideki Fujisawa, otherwise known as Dance Man (dansu man;ダンス☆マン), who has also written songs for Morning Musume and the animated TV series Sgt. Frog.

On April 4, 2001, "Yatta!" was released under the Pony Canyon label in Japan. It surprisingly hit No. 6 in the charts and went triple-platinum in Japan within a number of weeks. While the song was intended to be humorous, some viewers outside Japan assumed it to be earnest, perhaps due to the obvious work that went into the special effects in the video. The incomprehensibility of such an elaborate video enhanced its popularity among Western audiences who could not understand the Japanese lyrics.

The actors who performed as Happa-tai were brought to perform "Yatta!" in the US on Jimmy Kimmel Live!. Host Jimmy Kimmel compared himself to Ed Sullivan introducing the Beatles in their first American performance.

== Music video ==
The video features the band members singing and dancing exuberantly. Their signature moves include flexing their biceps and hopping from one foot to the other, performed while wearing only underwear with a large green Monstera leaf on the front, and white sneakers when outdoors. Their synchronized dancing and personalized poses for the camera parody the boy band craze of the early 2000s, while the sketch satirizes many of the stereotypes of Japanese pop culture, mainly doramas, sports TV shows and the shōjo manga aesthetic. This includes a group shot on a street filled with floating sakura blossoms, with the band's members posing energetically towards the camera, and a brief romantic interlude during the song's bridge, where a member receives a smile from a woman passing by in the street and stares at her longingly before being comforted by his partners.

== Members of Green Leaves ==
- Kiyotaka Nanbara (leader)
- Jun Nagura
- Taizo Harada
- Ken Horiuchi
- Jun Oki
- Noboru Ouchi (replaced by Ryuhei Ueshima during the band's reunion on Jimmy Kimmel Live!)
