= Asako Ito =

Japanese comedian (born 1970)

- いとう あさこ
- Born: June 10, 1970 (age 55); Shibuya, Tokyo, Japan
- Occupation: Comedian
- Years active: 1997 -
- Agent: Maseki Geinosha
- Height: 1.62 m (5 ft 4 in)
- Website: Official profile

Notes
- Same year/generation as: Koji Abe

Asako Ito (いとう あさこ, Itō Asako; born June 10, 1970, in Shibuya, Tokyo, Japan) is a Japanese comedian.

Ito is a resident of Nakano, Tokyo. She is a graduate of Togo Kindergarten, Futaba Elementary School, Futabachu Secondary School and High School, and Butai Geijyutsu Gakuin. She also competed on one tournament of Kunoichi, failing on the final obstacle in the first stage. She then failed the second chance round as she couldn't complete it before the winner.

== Filmography ==
=== Variety ===
Year	Title	Network	Notes	Ref.
2011	Hirunandesu!	NTV	Tuesdays	
2011	Meringue no Kimochi	NTV		
2013	PS San-sei	Chūkyō TV		
2014	Bi no Kuno no Osakai	TV Tokyo	Wednesday	
	Sekai no Hate Made Itte Q!	NTV	Sundays	

=== Drama ===
Year	Title	Role	Network	Notes
2015	Nagoya-iki Saishū Ressha Dai 3-dan	Shizuko Yukino	Nagoya TV	Episode 5
2015	Yōgi-sha wa 8-ri no Ninki Geinin	Principal	Fuji TV	

=== Radio series ===
Year	Title	Network	Notes
	Yoshinari Tsuji Radio Graffiti	NCB	
	Tera-chan no Tobidase! Happy Town	NCB	
	The Shooting Hits	Nack5	
	Asako Ito no Happi Party	Rainbowtown FM	
2009	Makoto Otake Golden Radio!	NCB	Wednesday "Otake Satellite" reporter
2009	Bakushō Mondai no Nichiyō Sunday	TBS Radio	
2009	DJ Tomoaki's Radio Show!	Shimokita FM	
2010	Asako Ito no All Night Nippon R	NBS	
2015	Tobe Saru Meikyoku Shōten Machi	NCB	

=== Films ===
Year	Title	Role	Notes
2004	Girl's Life Tokyo Noir	Health Jō	
2006	Peanuts	Secretary OL of financial company	
2010	Crayon Shin-chan: Super-Dimension! The Storm Called My Bride	Bride Corps F Asako (Voice)	

=== Advertisements ===
Year	Title	Notes	Ref.
2010	Oak Lawn Marketing "Hills Diet Pastel Jelly"		
2010	King Kankō		
2012	Aiful "Monowasure"		
2013	Glico Dairy "Chōshoku Probiotic Yogurt Bifix"		
2015	Suntoryfoods "Boss"		

=== Music videos ===
Year	Title	Notes
2010	Twill "Close to You"	Also appeared in the CD jacket
2013	Misia "Shiawase o Forever"	
