= Hideyuki Nakayama =

Japanese tarento, presenter, actor, and comedian (1967-)

- 中山 秀征
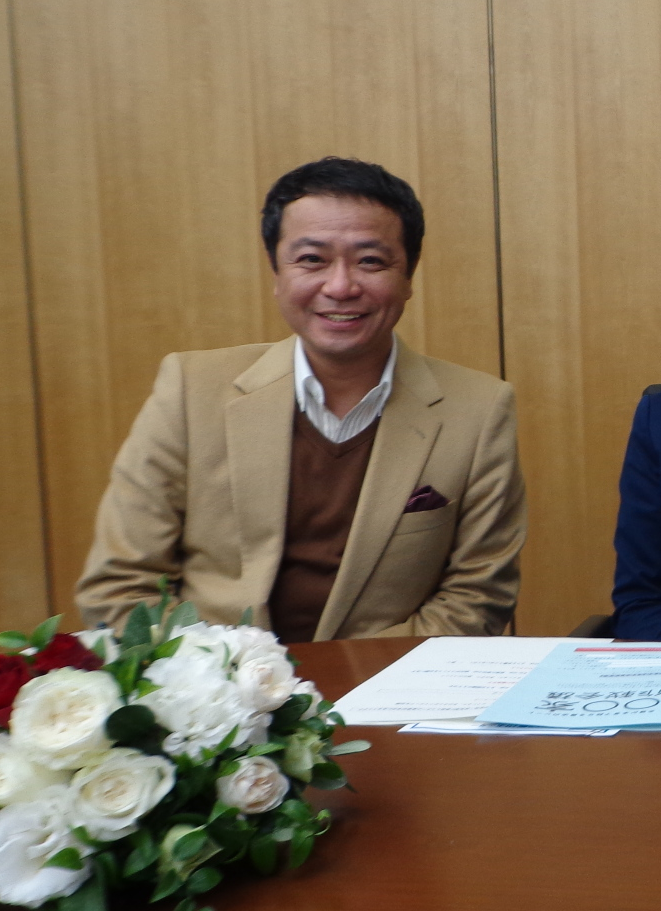
- Born: 31 July 1967 (age 59); Fujioka, Gunma, Japan
- Other names: Hide-san; Hide-chan
- Education: Kakiyo High School; Kurume High School (dropped out)
- Employer: Watanabe Entertainment
- Spouse: Ayaka Shiraki (m. 1998)

Comedy career
- Years active: 1982–

Notes
- Same year/generation as: Utchan Nanchan; Dacho Club; Tetsuro Degawa

Hideyuki Nakayama (中山 秀征, Nakayama Hideyuki; born 31 July 1967, in Fujioka, Gunma) is a Japanese tarento, presenter, actor, and comedian. He is nicknamed Hide-chan (ヒデちゃん) and Hide-san (ヒデさん).

He is represented with Watanabe Entertainment. He dropped out from Tsunamu Elementary School, North Junior High School (up to two semesters for three years), Persimmon Junior High School (only three semesters for three years), Kakiyo High School, and Kurume High School.

== Biography ==
In 1985, he and Daisuke Matsuno (now a novelist) from the same production formed the AB Brothers (ABブラザーズ, Ē Bī Burazāzu). In the same year, they debuted in Fuji Television's Lion no Itadakimasu as assistants. They were popular mainly in young women in their appearances including Nippon Broadcasting System's AB Brothers no All Night Nippon (October 1985 - July 1987). However, their popularity declined after when they appeared in Itadakimasu in 1989. After that, he shifted to his work of acting and moderating by himself, in contrast to the direction with Matsuno seeking to be a comedical talent became prominent. In 1992, their activities as AB Brothers disappears spontaneously, as it is pursued by a third generation of comedy.

He later participated in popular television dramas such as Fuji Television's Tokyo Love Story in 1991 and Tokyo Broadcasting System's Depart! Natsu Monogatari as a supporting character. Also, since 1992, he made regular appearances on Nippon TV's Daisuki! His light talks with Akiko Matsumoto and Naoko Iijima gathered support from viewers. Also, in 1994, he became a topic such as his relationship with former Onyanko Club member Yukiko Iwai. On the other hand, Nancy Seki said, "A star of bullfighting variety show scenes gave birth to a star who is watching TV. It's smooth with only the (entertainment industry) sharpness, relationships, and other circumstances which has nothing to do with me; Hideyuki Nakayama is a symbol of this in the inside of a cathode ray tube that is turning to." according to a column.

He served as "Ambassador Gunma" serving as PR of Gunma Prefecture together with tarento Miyuki Imori who is also from Gumma Prefecture the same as Nakayama.

He won the 30th Best Father Yellow Ribbon Award for Entertainment Category. Also, his wife played the role of the top daughter of the former Takarazuka Revue Company, and so on, there are exchanges between her Takaragenne career and her public and private life. In 2007, he played with Tsubasa Makoto in the stage show Show Mise-gai Kumikyoku,

== Filmography ==
=== Film ===
Year	Title	Role	Notes	Ref.
1998	Dangerous Cops: Forever	Nakamura		

=== Television drama ===
Year	Title	Role	Notes	Ref.
2025	Unbound	Katō Chikage	Taiga drama	

=== Other television ===
Year	Title	Notes	Ref.
1994–1995	Sports 100 Man-bai	As host	
1995–2002	The Night of Hit Parade	As host	
1997	Case Closed season 3 ep. "The Sunfish Murder"	Himself	
2011–present	Shu-Ichi	As host	
2016	Hideyuki Nakayama no Kyūkyoku House	As host	

=== Direct-to-video ===
Year	Title	Role	Notes	Ref.
1991	Dandy to Watashi	Keiichi		

== Discography ==
=== Singles ===
7 inch EP

Date	Title	Label	No.	Tie-up
21 Sep 1986	Ashita ni One Way	Pony Canyon	7A0641	Downtown-presented 4-Jidesu yō da opening theme
21 Jan 1987	Hoshikuzu no Angel	Pony Canyon	7A0677	Fujisankei Communications Group sponsored "Kokusai Sports Fair '87" image song

8 cm CD

Date	Title	Label	No.
26 Sep 1993	Hajikete Nagareta Hoshikuzu mitai ni	Polystar	PSDR-5027
25 May 1994	Natsuda!	Polystar	PSDR-5063

=== Albums ===
Date	Title	Label	No.
21 Feb 1987	19 Boy Story	Canyon Record	LP: C28A-0550; CD: D32A-0269
2 Aug 2017	50	Universal Music Zen Music	UPCH-2135

== See also ==
- Monta Mino – Predecessor of the Omoikkiri series
