= Japan Institute of the Moving Image =

Japanese film school and university

Coordinates: 35°36′18.0″N 139°30′27.1″E

The Japan Institute of the Moving Image (日本映画大学, Nihon Eiga Daigaku), formerly known as the Yokohama Broadcasting Technical School, is a film school and university located in Kawasaki, Japan. It was founded in 1975 by film director Shohei Imamura.

While a student at this school, director Takashi Miike was given his first film credit, as assistant director on Imamura's 1987 film Zegen.

By 2012, the president was Tadao Sato, who served until his death a decade later.

== Notable alumni ==
- Hito Steyerl
- Kim Eung-soo
- Kiyoshi Sasabe
- Takashi Miike
- Teruyoshi Uchimura
- Tetsurō Degawa
- Bakarhythm
- Eiko Kano
- Kosaka Daimaou
- Kotaro Tanaka
- Tsuneo Gōda

== See also ==
- Haruhiko Arai
