= Aaron Wolf =

Aaron Wolf may refer to:

- Aaron Wolf (director), American actor, writer and director
- Aaron Wolf (judoka) (born 1996), Japanese judoka
- Aaron ben Benjamin Wolf (c. 1670–1721), German rabbi
