= 24 Hour Television: Love Saves The Earth =

Japanese television fundraiser

24 Hour Television: Love Saves The Earth (Note: Japanese: 24時間テレビ 「愛は地球を救う」) (stylized in all caps) is a Japanese telethon held annually by the Nippon Television Network System, led by its flagship station Nippon Television.

It began in 1978 as one of the programs created to celebrate the 25th anniversary of NTV in 1978, with Tadahiko Tsuzuki, formerly of controversial late night variety show 11PM as its creator. NTV had been planning a special program for the occasion since 1977, Although some people believe 24 Hour Television is a copy of The Jerry Lewis MDA Labor Day Telethon, Tadahiko never watched it. In its first edition in 1978, the goal was to raise funds for bathrooms for bed-ridden elderly and buses with elevators and wheelchairs for disabled people. At the end, over 1.19 billion yen were donated.

In addition to helping poor and disabled people in Japan, the charity also receives donations in favor of international disasters. There are also special tie-in programs. From 1978 to 1989, Osamu Tezuka made nine anime specials in conjunction with the event, with Bander's Book being the first, to open the first edition.

Okinawa Prefecture, which does not have an NNN/NNS affiliate, is represented by Okinawa Television, whose local fundraising campaigns are reported nationwide under the Fuji News Network brand, as the station is an FNN affiliate.

The telethon is also known for its mountain-climbing stunts. For the 1988 edition, coinciding with NTV's 35th anniversary, the first high-definition footage of Mount Everest, following the Chinese climbing route, was broadcast, while in 2001, its crew climbed Mount Kilimanjaro in Tanzania, however, in standard definition, with support from Presteigne Charter.

Other channels have made their own special events in reaction to 24HOUR TELEVISION. Since 2003, adult channel Paradise TV holds a fundraiser event, 24-Hour TV: Eroticism Saves the Earth with the aim of raising funds for the research of HIV/AIDS, which had been rising in Japan at the time. Unlike NTV's telethon, Paradise TV focuses less on the numerical value of the donations, but rather on the cause. As of 2010, donations were in the region of 2 million yen.

== Controversy ==
The program is known for attracting both criticism and support from viewers every year. One source of controversy concerns the appearance fees paid to its participants. Hikaru Nishida, who was born in Japan and raised in the United States, has recalled that she was surprised to learn that she had been paid for appearing on what was supposed to be a charity program. NTV stated that “in principle, we ask performers to participate on a volunteer basis, but we provide honoraria to those who are required to commit a considerable amount of time.” The network thus acknowledged that some participants receive compensation for their appearances.
