= Shinya Kote =

Japanese actor (born 1973)

- 小手 伸也
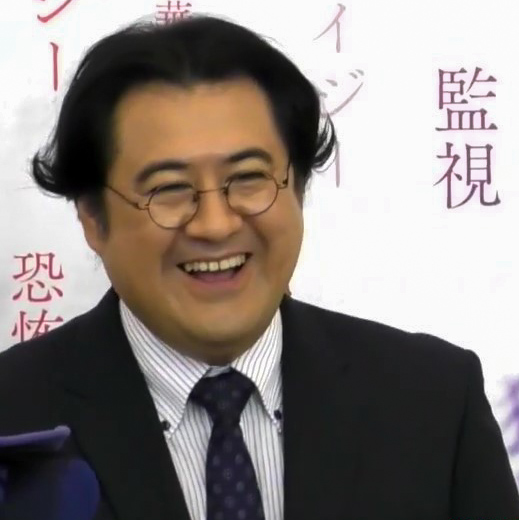
- Born: 25 December 1973 (age 52); Kanagawa Prefecture, Japan
- Education: Waseda University
- Occupations: Actor; voice actor; writer; director

Shinya Kote (小手 伸也, Kote Shin'ya; born 25 December 1973, in Kanagawa Prefecture) is a Japanese actor, voice actor, writer, and director. He is represented with Office PSC.

Kote graduated from Takehaya Senior High School. He also graduated from Waseda University School of Education. After belonging to the theatre club in the university, Waseda University Theater Club, Kote presided over the Gekidan innerchild. He specializes in psychology and mythical specialized drama, he is deeply aware of Japanese mythology, especially Kojiki. Kote is familiar with his own style and the gap as an actor is intense.

== Filmography ==
=== Films ===
Year	Title	Role	Notes	Ref.
2005	Hoshi ni natta Shōnen			
2008	Tokumei Kakarichō: Hitoshi Tadano: Saigo no Gekijō-ban			
2009	The Dark Harbor		Lead role	
2011	High School Debut			
2014	Hibi Rock			
2019	The Confidence Man JP: The Movie	Igarashi		
2020	The Confidence Man JP: Episode of the Princess	Igarashi		
2020	Stigmatized Properties			
2022	The Confidence Man JP: Episode of the Hero	Igarashi		
2022	Tang and Me			
2023	Tokyo MER: Mobile Emergency Room – The Movie	Jiro Fuyuki		
2023	We're Broke, My Lord!	Hashizume Saheiji		
2023	The Pearl Legacy			
2023	Girls Drive	Taro Miyaoka		
2024	What If Shogun Ieyasu Tokugawa Was to Become the Prime Minister	Ashikaga Yoshimitsu		
2024	Lovesick Ellie	Michael		
2025	My Beloved Stranger			
2025	Tokyo MER: Mobile Emergency Room – Nankai Mission	Jiro Fuyuki		
2025	Beethoven Fabrication	Ignaz Schuppanzigh		
2025	New Interpretation of the End of Edo Period	Kondō Isami		
2026	Sakamoto Days	Boiled		
2026	Beasts Clutching at Straws	Katsuji Higo		
2026	Tokyo MER: Mobile Emergency Room – Capital Crisis	Jiro Fuyuki		

=== TV dramas ===
Year	Title	Role	Notes	Ref.
2001	Hero	On-site reporter		
xxxx	Anrakuisu Tantei to UFO no Yoru	Raita Edogawa		
2005	Tales of the Unusual: Spring 2005	Ozaki	Short drama; episode "Kentaiki Tokkōyaku"	
xxxx	Tiger & Dragon		Episode 10	
xxxx	Chase: Kokuzei Sasatsu-kan	Inspector		
xxxx	Meshibana Deka Tachibana	Kohei Tanaka		
xxxx	Inpei Sōsa	Hisao Kojima		
xxxx	Is There a Vet in the House?	Kazumasa Tamura		
2016	Sanada Maru	Ban Naoyuki	Taiga drama	
xxxx	Kamen Rider Ex-Aid	Ren Amagasaki		
2018	The Confidence Man JP	Igarashi		
2018–20	Suits	Mitsugu Kanie	2 seasons	
2019	Natsuzora: Natsu's Sky	Noboru Idohara	Asadora	
2019	The Confidence Man IG	Igarashi	Lead role	
2021	Tokyo MER: Mobile Emergency Room	Jirō Fuyuki		
2023	What Will You Do, Ieyasu?	Ōkubo Tadayo	Taiga drama	
2024	GTO Revival	Fujiyamada		
2024	Omusubi	Manabu Morikawa	Asadora	

=== Anime ===
Year	Title	Role	Notes	Ref.
xxxx	capeta	Shigeo Hira		
xxxx	Yu-Gi-Oh! 5D's	Rex Godwin		
xxxx	Landreaall	Zeksren Ravenard	OVA	
2020	Great Pretender	Igarashi		

=== Video games ===
Year	Title	Role	Notes	Ref.
xxxx	Yu-Gi-Oh! 5D's: Tag Force 6	Rex Godwin		
2026	Professor Layton and the New World of Steam	Bolt Allinston		

=== Stage ===
Run	Title	Location
10–12 Oct 1995	Ohayō no Musume Vol.4 Watashi no Sekai –Kibun wa Love Horror–	Studio Akasaka Play Box
1–27 May 1997	Kamukamu Minikīna Suzuki no Daichi	Ikebukuro Theater Green
21 Jul – 19 Aug 1997	Nylon 100 °C 11th Session Camera≠Man Nenhitsu	Shimokita The Suzunari
1998 –	Gekidan innerchild no Zen Sakuhin	
24–28 Mar 1999	Panasonic Globe Theatre 10 Shūnenkinen Kōen Do pondo (Ochī Jito)–Venice de Oborete	Tokyo Globe Theaters
7–13 Jun 1999	Sessha Munieru DX Juki	Shimokita Ekimae Theater
17 Nov – 23 Dec 2001	Gekidan Shin Kan-sen Chokugeki! Dragon Rock 3 Gōten Tai Alien	Akasaka Act Theater
11 Apr – 15 Jun 2003	Noda Map Daikyūkai Kōen Oil	bunkamura Theater Cocoon
2–6 Jul 2003	Mizuki Sano Shuen Comic Jack	Saitama Arts Theater Small Hall
3–24 Nov 2003	Meiji-za Saikai-ba 10-shūnen Kōen Sannin Kichizae Dono Akatsuki	Meiji-za
17 Mar – 13 Apr 2004	New National Theatre Tokyo Tōmei Ningen no Yuge	New National Theatre Middle Theatre
16 Jan – 5 Feb 2005	Team Happō-B-Zin Tsukaenaito	Shimokita Honda
26 Jul – 6 Aug 2006	Kodomo no Shiro+Nelke Planning Produce Nangoku Pool no Atsui Suna	Aoyama Amphitheater
6–10 Sep 2006	Kamukamu Minikīna+Nelke Planning presents Ochī Hitodo pondo (saien)	Panasonic Globe Theatre
24 Oct – 8 Nov 2009	*pnish* vol.11 Maharaja Mode	Ikebukuro Sunshine Theater
2011 –	Inchai Sapuri Shinya Kote no Yoku wakaru Kojiki	
30 Nov – 4 Dec 2011	BQMAP Fūun Tengu-Moonlight Serenade	Shinjuku Theater Sun Mall
13–17 Sep 2012	Theatre Gekidango Gekidan Sōritsu 20 Shūnenkinen Dai 29-kai Kōen Ochiudo-tachi no Broadway	Shinjuku Kinokuniya Hall
Jul 2012/Jul 2013	Broadway Musical Peter Pan <2012-2013>	Tokyo International Forum Hall C
27 Dec 2012 – 2 Feb 2013	Atelier Dancan Produce Seishun Ongaku Katsugeki Kiben Hashire Merosu	Ginza Hiroshima Theater
16 Jan – 8 Feb 2014	Atelier Dancan Produce Shichihenge Ongaku Geki	Shimokita Honda
4 Apr – 23 Sep 2015	Akihiro Miwa Enshutsu Shuen Black Lizard	New National Theatre
20–27 Jan 2016	Nelke Planning Produce Comic Jack -Return 2016-	Shinjuku Kinokuniya Southern Theater
27 Apr – 14 May 2016	papageno Produce Seishun Ongaku Katsugeki: Kiben Hashire Merosu (Saien)	Shinjuku Theater Sun Mall
25 Jul – 5 Aug 2016	AKB48 Butai Majisuka Gakuen –Lost In The SuperMarket–	Akasaka Act Theater
18 Nov – 18 Dec 2016	Musical Black Butler	Tokyo Dome City Hall

=== Dub ===
- Hoppers, King George
