= Ucchan Nanchan =

Japanese comedy duo

- (ウッチャンナンチャン)
- Employer: Maseki Geinosha

Comedy career
- Years active: 1984–
- Members: Teruyoshi Uchimura; Kiyotaka Nanbara

Notes
- Same year/generation as: Tetsurō Degawa, Koji Imada, Dacho Club

Ucchan Nanchan (ウッチャンナンチャン) is a Japanese owarai duo with a long history composed of Teruyoshi Uchimura (内村 光良, Uchimura Teruyoshi) and Kiyotaka Nanbara (南原 清隆, Nanbara Kiyotaka). They are employed by Maseki Geinosha, a talent agency based in Tokyo.
