= Chocolate Planet =

Japanese comedy duo

- チョコレートプラネット
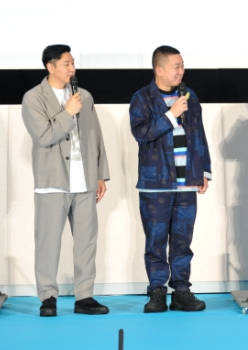
- Employer: Yoshimoto Kogyo

Comedy career
- Years active: 2006–present
- Genres: comic skits, impersonation, manzai comedy
- Members: Shohei Osada, Shun Matsuo
- Website: Official Website

Chocolate Planet (Japanese: チョコレートプラネット, Hepburn: Chokorēto Puranetto) is a comedy duo and pair of YouTubers managed by the Tokyo office of the Yoshimoto Kogyo entertainment conglomerate. This comedy group consists of two graduates of the eleventh class of a comedy school known as Yoshimoto New Star Creation (NSC). Their name is sometimes abbreviated as Choko-pura (チョコプラ, Chokopura). In Japanese they are classified as an owarai kombi, which is essentially a comic pair.

== Members ==
Shohei Osada (長田庄平), who was born January 28, 1980, in Kyoto, is in charge of creating much of this duo's comic material. He graduated Saga Art Junior College, which is now known as Kyoto Saga University of Arts. His hobbies include snowboarding, pottery, motocross, and jogging. In addition to being a good singer, he is a skillful dancer. Before becoming a comedian, he taught a pottery class in Kyoto. In the 2011 R-1 Grand Prix entertainment contest, which he participated in under the name of "Osada Shoulder," he advanced to the semi-finals and in 2018 he made it to the finals. He became a close friend of some members of the comic trio Panther Mukai at this time. Although he was married on February 14, 2016, he kept that marriage secret at first upon his manager's advice. On February 14, 2017, he announced his marriage publicly and his son was born. In 2000–2021 he also served as an occasional voice actor in NHK's educational "Eigo de Asobo with Orton" TV Series.

Shun Matsuo (松尾駿), who was born August 18, 1982, takes on the traditional comic roles of a straight man as well as a comic foil. He was born in the town of Hakone in Kanagawa prefecture, about one hundred kilometers southwest of Tokyo. His father is a cousin of Masayuki Tanaka, who used to be a noted Japanese rock vocalist. In 2001, he entered the Chiyoda College of Technology and Art. While there he worked part-time at a restaurant in Odawara-Kamomiya. He also worked at a cardboard factory in 2003 and for a short time at Uniqlo. His former stage name was "Matsuo Underground", which was taken from his favorite hip-hop group, the Nitro Microphone Underground. On March 18, 2011, he announced that his stage name would be changed to "Our Holiday." He announced his marriage on Twitter on May 20, 2018, and became a father on June 22, 2020. His hobbies include basketball, snowboarding, music, soccer, and DJ work.

== Joint activities ==
Shohei Osada and Shun Matsuo first paired up in 2004, just before graduating from the Yoshimoto New Star Creation school for entertainers. They survived for 10 weeks on January 16, 2007, in a survival show organized on Yoshimoto Fandango TV. From April 28, 2009, to May 2, they performed a play named Moukifuboku [盲亀浮木, Unusual Things] at the Yoshimoto Kogyo Theater in Osaka. This was their first big joint performance and for a while they appeared regularly at that theater. They worked for a unit known as "Tokyo Wonder Swan" that consisted of young entertainers run by the same entertainment conglomerate.

Chocolate Planet won the F-1 Grand Prix entertainment contest on November 23, 2010, and also received a "Red Carpet Award" for a Japanese comedy program called "Bakushou Red Carpet" that was broadcast on July 28, 2012. They have appeared on the TV show "Ariyoshi no Kabe" many times since December 28, 2015. Moreover, on January 14, 2019, they became the first MCs for the "Unbiased Reality Show Fetish Koi" which was video streamed on Abema TV.

On January 31, 2019, they were also MCs for Asahi Television's "Karei-naru Ichizoku no Maverick" broadcast.

On August 27, 2025, a new program co-hosted with Arashi's Kazunari Ninomiya was announced. Ninochoco Match is scheduled to start airing on September 3.

In recent years Chocolate Planet has utilized SNS extensively. In addition to active YouTube pages, they also have attracted many followers on Instagram and TikTok.

== Performance style ==
Most of the performances by Chocolate Planet consist of humorous narratives known as konto. Osada generally takes the role of tsukkomi (straight man), providing a chance for Matsuo to crack jokes, make blunders, or act stupidly. Sometimes they reverse roles, and occasionally they perform gags in which the roles become blurred.

This pair is also noted for their manzai performances, impersonations, and rhythmic material. Both Osada and Matsuo enjoy imitating other Japanese celebrities. For example, in 2017 Matsuo imitated the Japanese transgender talent Ikko, while pretending to be a beautician. Moreover, Osada has imitated the noted Kyōgen performer Izumi Motoya, attracting widespread applause.

== Filmography ==
=== Television ===
- Bakushou Red Carpet (Performers, 2007–)
- Tanuki to Kitsune (MC, 2025– )
- Nino Choco Match (MC, 2025)
- Chikyū marugoto dai jikken: Nature Teacher (地球まるごと大実験 ネイチャーティーチャー) (July 2025) (with Timelesz's Hara and Shinozuka)
