= Yugo Kochi =

Japanese entertainer

- 髙地優吾
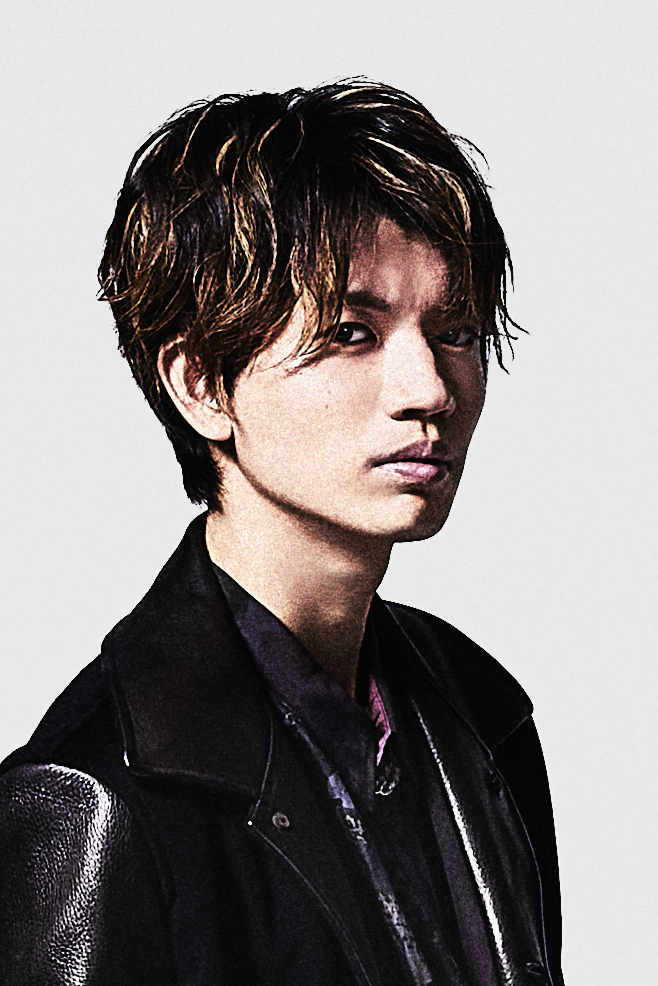
- Born: March 8, 1994 (age 32); Kanagawa, Japan
- Education: Wako University (Faculty of Modern Human Studies, Department of Psychology and Education)
- Occupations: Singer; Actor
- Years active: 2009–present
- Agent: Starto Entertainment
- Height: 175 cm (5 ft 9 in)
- Musical career
- Genres: J-Pop
- Label: Sony Music Entertainment Japan
- Member of: SixTONES
- Formerly of: B.I.Shadow
- Website: sixtones.jp

Yugo Kochi (髙地優吾, Kochi Yugo; born March 8, 1994), is a Japanese actor and singer. He is a member of the boy group SixTONES under STARTO Entertainment.

== Background ==
Yugo Kochi was born on March 8, 1994, in Kanagawa, Japan. ‘Yugo’ was a name given by his grandfather, with the hope of him growing up to be a kind person. He was in football club during the primary and junior high school, while even becoming a candidate for his regional team of Yokohama during junior high school. Though he could not continue with football in high school, he created a futsal team with his university friends and even reached the top 16 of Kanto Tournament.

Yugo is known to love visiting different hot springs during his free time, and it was revealed that he got his ‘Hot Spring Sommelier’ qualification in 2019.

== Career ==
Despite having no initial plans to enter the entertainment industry, Yugo joined Johnny & Associates after winning an audition segment on the NTV variety program School Kakumei!, for which his friend had submitted the application. He won the regular spot on the program beating more than 1300 contestants.

On June 4, 2009, Yugo became a member of Yuma Nakayama w/B.I.Shadow along with Yuma Nakayama, Kento Nakajima, Fuma Kikuchi and Hokuto Matsumura. Three days later on June 7, Ryousuke Yamada and Yuri Chinen of Hey! Say! JUMP were added to the group to form a limited-time unit NYC Boys with whom Yugo made CD-debut on June 15, 2009.

On March 29, 2011, B.I.Shadow's members Fuma Kikuchi and Kento Nakajima announced their debut in Sexy Zone on November of the same year, leading to the de facto dissolution of B.I.Shadow.

Yugo made his debut as an actor on April 14, 2012, in Shiritsu Bakaleya Koukou playing the role of Makoto Jinbo.

Beginning from July 2019, he has a regular spot Egao no YouGo! in the Yokohama Walker magazine. On August 8, 2019, during the Johnnys Junior 8.8 Matsuri~ Tokyo Dome kara hajiramu, it was announced that he will be making CD debut with his group SixTONES in 2020.

== Filmography ==
=== Film ===
Year	Title	Role	Note	Ref.
2012	Bakaleya High School	Jinbo Makoto	Support role	
2019	Ninja Drones?	Egao	Main role	

=== Television ===
Year	Title	Role	Network	Notes	Ref.
2012	Shiritsu Bakaleya Koukou	Jinbo Makoto	NTV	Support role	
2014	Kagemusha Tokugawa Ieyasu	Toyotomi Hideyori	TV Tokyo	Support role	
2018	Black Forceps	Tamura Hayato	TBS	Guest role (Episode 3)	
2018	Yo nimo Kimyo na Monogatari: 2018 Fall Special	Munenori	Fuji Television	Episode: Mathematic na Yuugure	
2020	Kaseifu no Mitazono Season 4	Yuhei Kunikida	TV Asahi	Guest role (Episode 3)	
2020	Babel Kyusaku	Ken Goto	NTV	Support role	
2022	Tokuso 9 Season 5	Yukito Shirahane	TV Asahi	Guest role (Episode 3)	
2025	Musashi no Rondo	Bunta Musashibara	TV Asahi	Support role	
2025	The Other Musashino Rondo	Bunta Musashibara	TV Asahi	Lead role	
2026	Professional: Insurance Investigator Ren Amane	Okouchi Hiroya	Fuji Television	Guest role (Episode 7)	
2026	Tabi no Oto: Kamakura-hen	Kawamoto Hisashi	Train TV	Lead role	

=== Variety show ===
Year	Title	Network	Notes	Ref.
2009 - present	School Kakumei!	NTV	Regular member	
2025 - present	Wild Tripper!!	Prime Video	Main host	
2026	SixTONES Kochi Hatsu Kochi: Dotabata Yokubari Tabi	KUTV	Main host	

== Stage Appearances ==
Year	Title	Role	Venue	Notes	Ref.
2022	A Midsummer Night's Dream	Lysander	Nissay Theatre	Support role	
2023	Let Us Go Out Into the Starry Night (Japanese: 星降る夜に出掛けよう)	Ōji (The Prince)	Minamiza (Kyoto), Osaka Shochikuza (Osaka)	Lead role	
2024	Come Blow Your Horn	Buddy Baker	New National Theatre (Tokyo), Morinomiya Piloti Hall (Osaka)	Lead role	
2025	One Day, One Time, a Man Who Wasn’t There (Japanese: ある日、ある時、ない男。)	Ryosuke Kurumatani	Tokyo Globe Theatre, Umeda Arts Theater Drama City, J:COM Kitakyushu Arts Theatre	Lead role	
