= Hana no Zubora-Meshi =

Japanese manga series

- First tankōbon volume cover

花のズボラ飯
- Manga
- Written by: Masayuki Kusumi
- Illustrated by: Etsuko Mizusawa
- Published by: Akita Shoten
- Magazine: Elegance Eve
- Original run: 25 April 2009 – 26 August 2015
- Volumes: 3
- Television drama
- Directed by: Noriko Yuasa; Yasuyuki Fukasako
- Written by: Ōkura; Ayako Kitakawa
- Original network: TBS, MBS
- Original run: 23 October 2012 – 25 December 2012
- Episodes: 10

Hana no Zubora-Meshi (花のズボラ飯; lit. "Hana's Sloppy Meals") is a Japanese cooking manga series written by Masayuki Kusumi and illustrated by Etsuko Mizusawa. It was serialized in Akita Shoten's josei manga magazine Elegance Eve from April 2009 to August 2015.

It tells the story of Hana, a young woman living alone while her husband is away, who embraces her solitary life by cooking delicious, albeit sloppy, meals in her cozy home.

It received a nomination at the 4th Manga Taishō. It was adapted into a television series in 2012.

== Characters ==
Hana Komazawa (駒沢花, Komazawa Hana)
Portrayed by: Kana Kurashina
Osoi (遅井)
Portrayed by: Shigeaki Kato

== Media ==
=== Manga ===
Written by Masayuki Kusumi and illustrated by Etsuko Mizusawa, Hana no Zubora-Meshi was serialized in Akita Shoten's josei manga magazine Elegance Eve from 25 April 2009 to 26 August 2015. The series' chapters were collected into three tankōbon volumes released from 20 December 2010 to 16 November 2015.

No.	Release date	ISBN
1	20 December 2010	978-4-253-10452-4
2	8 March 2012	978-4-253-10459-3
3	16 November 2015	978-4-253-10611-5

=== Drama ===
A live-action television drama adaptation aired 10 episodes on TBS and MBS between 23 October and 25 December 2012.

== Reception ==
The series was nominated for the 4th Manga Taishō in 2011 and was ranked 4th. The series topped the 2012 edition of Takarajimasha's Kono Manga ga Sugoi! guidebook list of the best manga for female readers.

== See also ==
- Moshi Moshi, Terumi Desu, another manga series by Etsuko Mizusawa
