= Tetsurō Degawa =

Japanese comedian (born 1964)

- 出川 哲朗
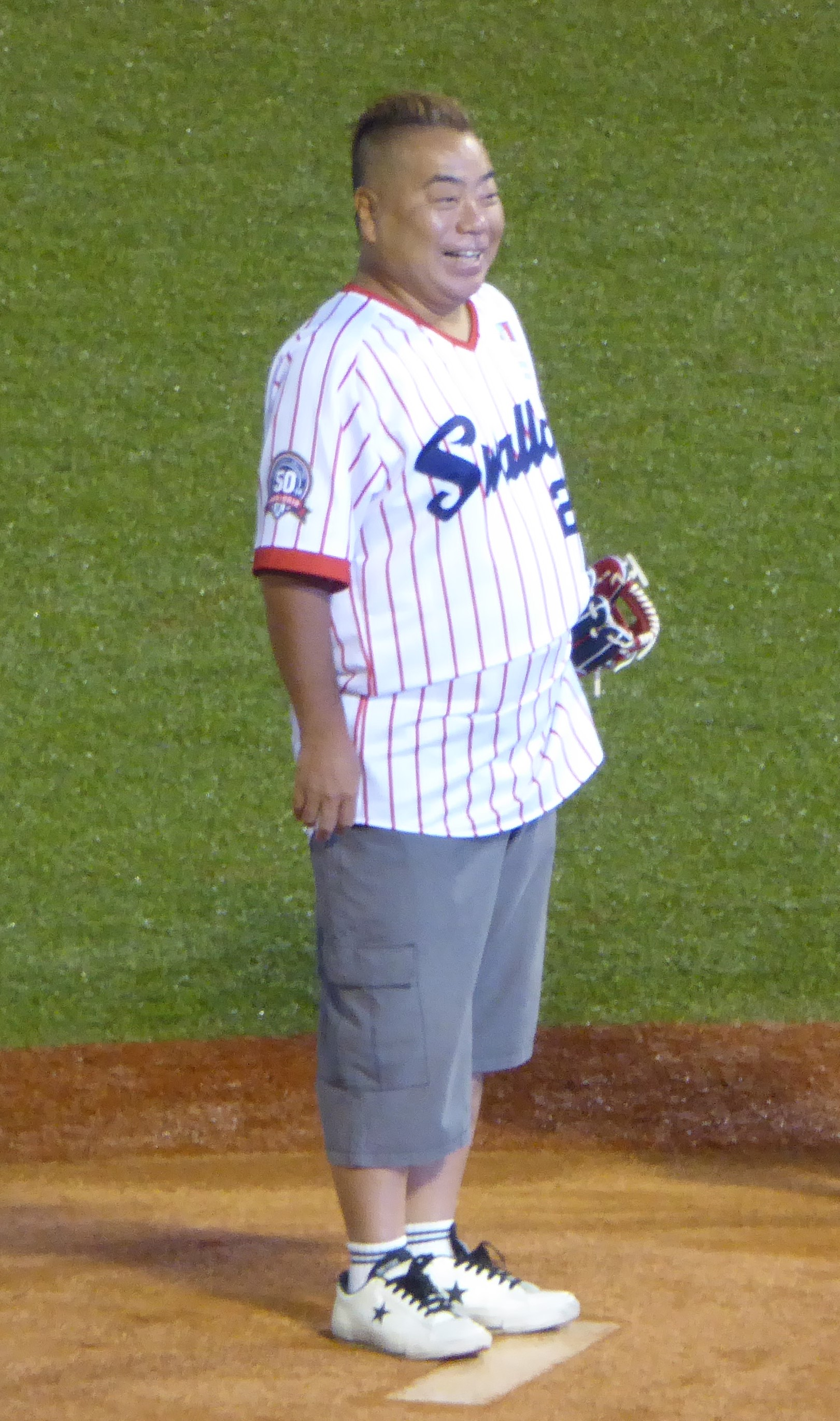
- Degawa at the Meiji Jingu Stadium, 2019
- Born: February 13, 1964 (age 62); Yokohama, Kanagawa, Japan
- Employer: Maseki Geinosha

Comedy career
- Years active: 1985 - Present
- Medium: Television
- Genre: Reaction comedy

Notes
- Same year/generation as: Ucchan Nanchan; Koji Imada; Dacho Club; Hideyuki Nakayama

Tetsurō Degawa (出川 哲朗, Degawa Tetsurō; born February 13, 1964, in Kanagawa-ku, Yokohama, Kanagawa) is a Japanese comedian.

== Character ==
Representative of the so-called "reaction entertainers," he is known for his thick voice. His favorite phrase is "Yabaiyo, yabaiyo!" (やばいよやばいよ!, It's dangerous, dangerous!), which has been mimicked by many co-stars. Degawa appeared on the 19th Sasuke competition, where he struggled on the first obstacle (the Sextuple Step) and failed on the second obstacle (the Log Grip).

== Filmography ==
=== Film ===
- Tora-san, Wish You Were Here (2019)

=== TV Drama ===
- Mysterious Nile Girl Thutmose (1991) - Third son of the Three Nile Demon Brothers (ep. 16 - 18)

=== Dubbing ===
- Piranha 3D (2011) - Deputy Fallon (Ving Rhames)

== See also ==
- Teruyoshi Uchimura (内村光良)
- Kiyotaka Nanbara (南原清隆)
- Udo Suzuki (Kyai~n) (ウド鈴木 [キャイ～ン])
- Yoshihiro Suzuki (鈴木慶裕)
