= Sakamoto Days (TV series) =

Japanese anime television series

- Type: TV series
- Genre: Action comedy
- Based on: Sakamoto Days
- Created by: Yuto Suzuki
- Directed by: Masaki Watanabe (S1); Daisuke Nakajima (S2)
- Series composition: Taku Kishimoto
- Character designer: Yō Moriyama
- Music by: Yuki Hayashi
- No. of seasons: 1
- No. of episodes: 22

Production
- Art director: Yukiko Maruyama
- Sound director: Jin Aketagawa
- Cinematographer: Polun Tsai
- Color designer: Manami Sasa
- Editor: Aya Hida
- Studio: TMS Entertainment
- Producers: Mirai Yamauchi; Ryōta Hasegawa; Sōichirō Saitō
- Production companies: Sakamoto Days Project (Note: Label consisting of various companies)

Original release
- Network: TV Tokyo
- Release: January 11, 2025 – present

Sakamoto Days is a Japanese anime television series based on the manga series Sakamoto Days by Yuto Suzuki. The story revolves around Taro Sakamoto, a retired, legendary hitman who has settled into a quiet, mundane life as a family man. However, his peaceful life is disrupted when former enemies and colleagues from his hitman days come seeking revenge, prompting him to form alliances with younger friends to fight alongside them. The series is produced by TMS Entertainment and premiered on TV Tokyo on January 11, 2025. The first season aired for two split cours. The first cours aired from January to March 2025 and the second cours aired from July to September of that same year. A second season is set to premiere in January 2027.

== Premise ==
Taro Sakamoto used to be an unrivaled hitman, earning legendary status in the criminal underworld by being feared by some and idolized by others. One day, however, Sakamoto fell in love at first sight with Aoi, a convenience store clerk. For them to date, Aoi gave him the ultimatum that he must quit being a hitman and never kill again. Sakamoto agreed, and after his retirement, they started dating, got married, had a daughter named Hana, and eventually opened a family-run convenience store of their own in the suburbs of Tokyo.

Several years later, Sakamoto has settled into his humble life, but also grown portly as a result of his relative inactivity despite still being immensely powerful. The world of hitmen eventually locates him, and many soon attempt to target the Sakamoto family, either seeking revenge or resenting his retired status. Now, with the help of three other former criminals who become employed at the store under Sakamoto—clairvoyant hitman Shin Asakura, orphaned crime boss daughter Lu Xiaotang, and sniper Heisuke Mashimo—Sakamoto must protect his family (or die trying) against the criminal underworld, all while maintaining Aoi's no-kill policy.

== Production ==
Masaki Watanabe served as director for the first season of the series. Watanabe noted that Sakamoto's design reflects the original manga's expressiveness while distinguishing his two forms; the fat version has a symbolically deformed face, while the skinny version is more realistic. Watanabe highlighted Sakamoto's distinctive personality and calm daily life, which create a striking contrast during action sequences involving his obese physique. The director also emphasized the unique sound effects and vocal performances for Shin, which were carefully crafted under his guidance. Reflecting on the narrative, Watanabe noted that despite its comedic foundation, the series occasionally delivers unexpected moments of violence, an aspect he found particularly commendable. Despite his experience with shōnen manga, Watanabe found Sakamoto Days to be a unique challenge, as he aimed to balance intense action sequences with the lighthearted tone established by Suzuki. One of the most demanding scenes in the early episodes involved a rollercoaster fight, which required extensive time to create a detailed 3D model and manage the scene's vibrant color palette. The animation was done using Clip Studio Paint and Adobe, incorporating a paper texture to enhance the visual style of the action sequences. Additionally, the team researched real firearms to ensure their accurate depiction in the anime.

Tomokazu Sugita voices the protagonist Taro Sakamoto, having previously been familiar with the original manga series. Initially cast as Kashima, he was later asked to voice Sakamoto instead, appreciating the character's relationships with family and friends. Nobunaga Shimazaki voices Shin Asakura, who noted that the character's perceived weakness and lack of skill, despite being over 20, creates a deliberate contrast with the stronger, more experienced characters, enhancing the cast's balance and making the dynamics more engaging. Lu Xiaotang is voiced by Ayane Sakura, who enjoyed exploring the character's dynamic interactions.

== Release ==
The series's first season was directed by Masaki Watanabe, with scripts by Taku Kishimoto, character designs by Yō Moriyama, and music composed by Yuki Hayashi. The series ran in two split season cours, with the first cours aired from January 11 to March 22, 2025, and the second cours aired from July 15 to September 23 of the same year, on TV Tokyo and its TXN affiliates. (Note: TV Tokyo listed the second cours premiere as airing on July 14 at 24:00, which is effectively July 15 at midnight JST.) The first two episodes of the second cours received an advanced screening in Japan on June 15. Netflix licensed the series for a worldwide streaming release, which was released simultaneously with its televised broadcast in Japan.

In December 2025, at the Jump Festa '26 event, a second season was announced. Daisuke Nakajima will direct, with Watanabe serving as supervising director. It is set to premiere on January 19, 2027. (Note: TV Tokyo listed the series premiere date on January 18 at 24:00, which is effectively January 19 at midnight)

== Music ==
For the first season, the first opening theme song is "Hashire Sakamoto" (走れSAKAMOTO; lit. 'Run, Sakamoto'), performed by Vaundy, while the first ending theme song is "Futsū" (普通; lit. 'Normal'), performed by Conton Candy. The special ending theme song for episode 7 is "Somebody Help Us", performed by Vaundy. The second opening theme song is "Method", performed by Kroi, while the second ending theme song is "Dandelion" (ダンデライオン), performed by Go!Go!Vanillas. For the second season, the opening theme song is "Papa wa Imada ni Juvenile" (パパはいまだにJuvenile; lit. 'Papa's Still a Juvenile'), performed by Creepy Nuts.

== Series overview ==
| Season | Episodes | | Originally released | |
| Season | Episodes | | First released | Last released |
|---|---|---|---|---|
| 1 | 22 | 11 | January 11, 2025 | March 22, 2025 |
| 1 | 22 | 11 | July 15, 2025 | September 23, 2025 |
| 2 | TBA | | January 19, 2027 | TBA |

== Episodes ==
=== Season 1 (2025) ===
| No. | Title | Directed by (Note: Production staff information is taken from the ending credits of each episode.) | Storyboarded by | Chief animation directed by | Original release date (Note: The first two episodes of each cours released simultaneously on Netflix Japan, while subsequent episodes released a week before their televised broadcast and international streaming release. As such, the episode table uses the latter dates.) |
|---|---|---|---|---|---|
Part 1
| 1 | "The Legendary Hit Man"; Transliteration: "Densetsu no Koroshiya" (Japanese: 伝説の殺し屋) | Masaki Watanabe | Masaki Watanabe | Masaki Hinata | January 11, 2025 |
Taro Sakamoto was once the most feared hitman in the criminal underworld, being practically unstoppable no matter how difficult the job was. However, after encountering Aoi, a convenience store clerk, he fell in love at first sight and left the underworld to marry her. Many years later, Sakamoto has opened his own convenience store which he operates alongside Aoi and their daughter Hana, and grew overweight. One day, clairvoyant hitman Shin Asakura tracks down Sakamoto to his store, having been ordered by a gang boss to convince him to return to the underworld or kill him. Shin attacks Sakamoto but quickly realizes that despite Sakamoto's physical appearance, his hitman skills are still as sharp as ever. Sakamoto defeats him but spares his life, letting him go after treating him to a family meal. Seeing that Sakamoto is happy with his family life, Shin returns to the gang boss and turns down the job. Sakamoto, who had been secretly tracking Shin, intervenes and helps Shin defeat the gang. Afterwards, Sakamoto hires Shin to be a clerk at his store.
| 2 | "Vs. Son Hee and Bacho"; Transliteration: "Bāsasu Sonhi・Bachō" (Japanese: VSソンヒ・バチョウ) | Akihiro Saitō, Masaki Watanabe & Yoshihiro Nishio | Masaki Watanabe | Yukiko Ban, Masaru Shindō & Masaki Hinata | January 18, 2025 |
Shin excels as a clerk by using his clairvoyance to meet customers' needs. Shin also learns that Aoi, Sakamoto's wife, strongly disapproves of his former life as a hitman and has warned she will leave him if he ever returns to that path. While visiting Chinatown to buy meat buns, Sakamoto and Shin witness a girl named Lu Xiaotang fighting off thugs. Helping her escape, Lu reveals she is the sole survivor of her mafia clan, which was massacred by a rival group seeking the key to her clan's treasure room. Sakamoto agrees to help her in exchange for her baking meat buns at his store. Suddenly, two assassins hired by the rival clan attack. During the battle, Shin reads Sakamoto's thoughts and learns he swore to Aoi to never kill again, instead choosing to atone by helping others. Sakamoto defeats the assassins and dismantles the rival clan. When Lu opens the treasure room she discovers a bottle of sake, her father's treasured item, meant to be shared with her upon adulthood. With nowhere else to go, Lu is hired as the store's meat bun cook. Meanwhile, the Japan Assassins Association (JAA) places a one billion yen bounty on Sakamoto.
| 3 | "Welcome to Sugar Park"; Transliteration: "Shugā Pāku e Yōkoso!" (Japanese: シュガーパークへようこそ！) | Yoshihiro Nishio | Masaki Watanabe & Akihiro Saitō | Masaki Hinata, Yukiko Ban & Yoshinori Deno | January 25, 2025 |
As Shin and Lu start getting used to working together. Nagumo, one of Sakamoto's old hitman acquaintances and master of disguise, enters the store to warn Sakamoto about the JAA's one billion yen bounty on him. Pizza deliveryman hitman Pizza Nakajima attempts to attack Sakamoto but is easily defeated, while the Dondenkai hitman office spies on the ordeal. Sakamoto reveals he is aware of their hidden camera and warns them against coming after him before destroying the camera. However, despite his wishes to lay low, Sakamoto remembers that he promised to spend the day with Aoi and Hana at the Sugar Park amusement park. Shin and Lu take it upon themselves to protect Sakamoto so he can focus on his family, and working together are able to thwart janitor hitman Kurii Ning. However, another hitman, Tatsu, is able to evade Shin's clairvoyance and gets within striking distance of Sakamoto on a roller coaster before Shin realizes his mistake and throws both himself and Tatsu off the ride. Shin ends up being temporarily blinded by Tatsu's poison, but he is able to successfully fight back and defeat Tatsu by reading Sakamoto's mind as he observes the fight and mentally guides Shin.
| 4 | "Hard-Boiled"; Transliteration: "Hādo-Boirudo" (Japanese: ハードボイルド) | Yoshihide Ibata | Yoshihide Ibata | Yoshinori Deno & Miyako Kamiya | February 1, 2025 |
Sakamoto interrogates Tatsu, who confirms that the billion yen bounty was issued by the JAA. Tatsu asks if Sakamoto was once a member of the Order, a legendary and mythical group of elite assassins. Though Sakamoto does not directly answer the question, his silence suggests he was a member. Surprisingly, Sakamoto lets Tatsu go free. Tatsu eventually crosses paths with Boiled and Obiguro, two assassins also hunting down Sakamoto for the bounty. Sakamoto, Shin, and Lu spend a peaceful rest of the day at the park with Aoi and Hana, ending their outing at a haunted house attraction, unaware it's actually a trap set by Boiled and Obiguro. Boiled separates Sakamoto from the group, while Obiguro captures Shin, Lu, Aoi, and Hana. Boiled attacks Sakamoto viciously with a rocket-powered gauntlet and explosive balls, ranting about their shared past at the JCC assassin school. Boiled reveals he once admired Sakamoto and saw him as a friend, but feels betrayed after learning that Sakamoto does not remember him. Initially overwhelmed, Sakamoto remembers Boiled after recalling a moment when he taught him about gunpowder composition. This reignites Sakamoto's resolve and he sheds his weight, returning to his original deadly assassin form to face off Boiled.
| 5 | "Source of Strength"; Transliteration: "Tsuyosa no Wake" (Japanese: 強さの理由(わけ)) | Takatoshi Suzuki | Masaki Watanabe | Masaki Hinata & Yoshinori Deno | February 8, 2025 |
Sakamoto's speed and strength is greatly enhanced in thin form and he manages to beat Boiled into submission, stating that even though he is no longer a hitman, he remains strong due to his desire to protect his family. Meanwhile, Obiguro becomes extremely impressed with Lu's drunken fighting style that allows her be evenly matched against her and lets everybody go out of respect. Witnessing Sakamoto's true strength, Boiled's respect for Sakamoto is restored and he agrees to stop pursuing him. Aoi learns about the bounty and angrily reminds Sakamoto that one of their family rules is to not keep secrets from each other, telling him to put the matter at rest. Sakamoto, Shin, and Lu head to Dondenkai's headquarters, where they find the entire office has been wiped out. They also find Nagumo, who explains that the Order, the JAA's special squad of the most elite assassins, has been tasked with investigating a string of hitmen murders by a mysterious individual known as "X". He also implies that X responsible for Sakamoto's bounty, given the murders started around the same time. Sakamoto begins training again to regain his strength, while Shin and Lu fend off hitmen looking for him.
| 6 | "Heisuke Mashimo"; Transliteration: "Mashimo Heisuke" (Japanese: マシモ ヘイスケ) | Yūki Taki & Tomoko Hiramuki | Susumu Nishizawa & Yūki Taki | Masaki Hinata & Yoshinori Deno | February 15, 2025 |
Amateur hitman Heisuke Mashimo, struggling financially and wanting to care for his pet bird Piisuke, sets his sights on Sakamoto's bounty. Unaware of Sakamoto's current appearance, Heisuke enters his store but gets bluffed into thinking he is at the wrong place. Desperate for money, Heisuke enters a paintball competition with a one million yen prize. Coincidentally, Sakamoto also enters the competition to earn money to repair damage done to his store by bounty-hunting hitmen. When Heisuke learns that only teams can participate, Sakamoto and Shin invite him to join theirs. Once the match begins, both are stunned by Heisuke's sharpshooting skills. A drunken Lu inadvertently reveals Sakamoto's identity to Heisuke. Seizing on the opportunity, Heisuke swaps out his airsoft gun for his real rifle and prepares to take out Sakamoto. Using his clairvoyance, Shin locates Heisuke's position and Sakamoto destroys his rifle with a well-aimed rock. Accepting defeat, Heisuke is surprised when Sakamoto praises his sniping abilities. The group wins the competition but is forced to return the prize money back for property damage caused by Heisuke. Later, Aoi shares with Shin the story of how she met Sakamoto, while Sakamoto warns Shin not to use his clairvoyance on her.
| 7 | "Jurassic Bastard"; Transliteration: "Jurashikku Yarō" (Japanese: ジュラシック野郎) | Yoshihiro Nishio | Hironori Tanaka | Miyako Kamiya, Yukiko Ban & Yuko Iwaoka | February 22, 2025 |
While Sakamoto and Aoi attend a school event for Hana, Shin and Lu are left to work the store. They both get into an argument about Shin's clairvoyance, which irritates Shin as he angrily leaves the store. A team of scientists arrive and kidnap Lu, mistaking her for Shin who they intended on taking back to Okutabi Lab. Shin and Sakamoto give chase but are thwarted by the hired hitman Seba, who can turn invisible. Shin leads Sakamoto to the lab, hidden inside the Okutabi Science Museum, where Shin explains he was raised but does not recall the scientists there being malicious. After defeating the lab's robotic security and entering, Shin learns from the scientists that an assassin group led by a hitman named Kashima seized control and took the lab's director hostage, forcing them to research methods of assassination. Meanwhile, Lu finds herself imprisoned with the director, Asakura, who tells her he has a plan to break out. Shin and Sakamoto defeat one of the assassins, Mad Horiguchi, and Sakamoto promises to liberate the lab and save Shin's childhood home. Outside, Order assassins Shishiba and Osaragi arrive at the museum to investigate a tip given to them by Nagumo.
| 8 | "Sakamoto's vs. the Lab"; Transliteration: "Sakamoto-shōten bāsasu Rābō" (Japanese: 坂本商店 vs LABO) | Kōki Onoue | Yukio Nishimoto | Masaki Hinata, Masaru Shindō & Yuko Iwaoka | March 1, 2025 |
Heisuke finds Aoi saddened that Sakamoto and the others have left, so he sends Piisuke to find them. At the lab, Horiguchi recovers and continues his battle with Sakamoto and Shin. Asakura tells Lu about his and Shin's pasts. Around a decade ago, a friend left Shin in Asakura's care. Inspired by Asakura's research into supernatural powers, Shin volunteered to be his assistant. One night, Shin accidentally drank a chemical Asakura was working on, which gave him his psychic powers. The other scientists grew afraid of Shin and Asakura tried to create a cure for him. Offended at everybody's fear of him, Shin abandoned the lab. Learning that Shin has come to liberate the lab, Asakura unlocks the cell and escapes with Lu. Upstairs, Sakamoto and Shin are able to overcome Horiguchi's drugs and gadgets and defeat him. They head out to find Lu, but are separated by a pit trap. Meanwhile, Shishiba and Osaragi confront Kashima, asking him for information about "Slur". Sakamoto drops down from above, and Shishiba and Osaragi leave Sakamoto to handle Kashima as they pursue Slur. Elsewhere, Shin is ambushed by Seiba but is able to mark Seiba with blood, allowing Heisuke to target him.
| 9 | "All Aboard"; Transliteration: "Kakekomi Jōsha" (Japanese: かけこみ乗車) | Takatoshi Suzuki | Tetsuo Hirakawa | Miyako Kamiya, Yuko Iwaoka, Yukiko Ban, Yoshinori Deno & Masaki Hinata | March 8, 2025 |
Despite being wounded, Seiba is able to ambush and wound Heisuke as well. Using his last bullet, Heisuke triggers a fire sprinkler which allows Shin to see and knock out Seiba. Meanwhile, Sakamoto continues his battle with Kashima. Despite his numerous cybernetic enhancements, Kashima is still no match for Sakamoto who easily defeats him. However, with Kashima's defeat, a self destruct system in the Lab is activated, causing the entire complex to begin to collapse. Shin and Heisuke head to the lower levels and reunite with Lu and Asakura, who subsequently apologize to Shin. Shin then uses his clairvoyance to find all of the scientists still trapped in the Lab and evacuates them. Meanwhile, Shishiba and Osaragi manage to recover surveillance footage of Slur, while Shin encounters Slur himself, who requests he greet Sakamoto in his stead. After everybody is safe, Asakura thanks Sakamoto for taking care of Shin, and Sakamoto and his employees return home for a family meal.
| 10 | "Bathhouse Roughhouse"; Transliteration: "Sentō Mōdo" (Japanese: せんとうモード) | Yūki Taki | Yoko Yanai & Yūki Taki | Masaki Hinata, Yukiko Ban, Yoshinori Deno, Masaru Shindō & Yuko Iwaoka | March 15, 2025 |
With everybody still weakened from their experience in the Lab, Sakamoto decides to have the whole family relax at a local bathhouse. However, the clerk at the front desk, Yutaro, is an amateur hitman who recognizes Sakamoto. He attempts to use covert traps hidden in the bathhouse to kill Sakamoto, but they all end up failing. Eventually, Yutero gives up, realizing that Sakamoto is too far out of his league. Two of Yutero's old bullies then arrive and begin harassing him, prompting Sakamoto to intervene and covertly knock out the bullies before complimenting Yutero's unique traps. Realizing Sakamoto knew he was a hitman all along, Yutero decides to quit being a hitman and focus on running the bathhouse. Later, Lu's family consigliere, a man named Lu Wutang, approaches her at a restaurant and requests that she take leadership her family's mafia clan, but she refuses, preferring her more peaceful life with Sakamoto. In order to settle matter, Wutang challenges Sakamoto, Lu, and Shin to a gambling competition in an underground casino. If Wutang wins, Lu must rejoin the mafia, but if Sakamoto wins, Wutang will give information about Sakamoto's bounty.
| 11 | "Casino Battle"; Transliteration: "Kajino Batoru" (Japanese: カジノバトル) | Yoshihide Ibata | Susumu Nishizawa | Masaki Hinata, Yukiko Ban, Yuko Iwaoka, Miyako Kamiya & Masaru Shindō | March 22, 2025 |
Despite not really knowing the rules of the casino games, Sakamoto and Shin are able to respectively leverage their hitman skills and clairvoyance to win games, while Wutang relies on card counting. As he plays, Wutang recalls how Lu befriended him despite being a mafia outcast, and ever since he swore his complete devotion to her. Both sides end up in a tie with the same exact amount of chips. As a tiebreaker, Wutang has everyone participate in a match of Old Maid, with the team that gets stuck with the Joker being the loser. Shin attempts to use his clairvoyance to gain an advantage, but Wutang overloads his mind with a deluge of complicated mental calculations, knocking Shin unconscious. Despite the setback, Sakamoto is able to gain the advantage by tricking Wutang into taking the Joker. However, Wutang's guards attempt mutiny so they can take Lu by force, causing Wutang to team up with Sakamoto and Lu to defeat them. To repay them for their time away from work, Wutang becomes a temporary employee at Sakamoto's store and reveals that Slur recently freed four infamous serial killers named Dump, Saw, Apart, and Minimalist, to eliminate Sakamoto and his associates.
Part 2
| 12 | "Overload" | Yoshihiro Nishio | Yukio Nishimoto | Masaki Hinata, Yukiko Ban, Yuko Iwaoka & Masaru Shindō | July 15, 2025 |
Dump, Apart, and Minimalist begin eliminating any assassins they find, while Saw decides to target Sakamoto. Meanwhile, Wutang takes his leave to investigate Slur while Sakamoto and his employees investigate Slur's killers. Elsewhere, Nagumo and his fellow Order members Hyo, Shishiba, Osaragi, and Takamura decide to hunt down the Slur's killers for intruding on their territory. Nagumo informs Sakamoto about the Order's intentions, but knowing the Order will outright kill Slur's killers, Sakamoto declares he will take them alive to interrogate them, though Nagumo points out Slur's killers do not consider Sakamoto a threat to them. At the hardware store, Shin and Lu are shopping for supplies when they are ambushed by Saw, who attacks them with his axe. Lu is quickly knocked out, leaving Shin to fight alone, but he has difficulty reading Saw's mind due to his singleminded obsession with killing. Frustrated as his own weakness and Saw boasting he will kill Sakamoto's family before moving on to the man himself, Shin manages to unlock a new level of clairvoyance, easily predicting Saw's movements without having to read his thoughts.
| 13 | "Just Desserts"; Transliteration: "Bachi Atari" (Japanese: ばちあたり) | Tomoko Hiramuki & Yoshihiro Nishio | Tetsuo Hirakawa | Yoshinori Deno, Miyako Kamiya, Masaru Shindō & Masaki Hinata | July 22, 2025 |
In a flashback, Wutang instructs Shin about not just reading a person's conscious thoughts, but their subconscious ones as well, which can mean the difference between life and death in a fight. Using this knowledge, Shin gains the upper hand on Saw, but only temporarily since his body is not used to his new power. Lu then intervenes, having gotten herself drunk on pure ethanol and awakening a completely new "mafia" personality. Working together, Shin and Lu defeat Saw, but fall unconscious from their wounds. Saw attempts to escape, but is intercepted and killed by Hyo. Shin and Lu later awake to find a JAA "Floater" cleanup crew repairing the damage caused from their fight with Saw. At a nearby shrine, Dump attacks Osaragi with extendable spikes hidden in her body. However, Dump is no match for Osaragi, who cuts her apart with her customized power saw. Elsewhere, Kashima is dismembered by Apart, who realizes Slur is using him. As Apart escapes, Kashima apologizes to Slur, who is not bothered since it should still fulfill their plan of grabbing the Order's attention. At Sakamoto's store, Minimalist enters and approaches Aoi, who politely greets him.
| 14 | "Strong Assault"; Transliteration: "Kyōshū" (Japanese: 強襲) | Takatoshi Suzuki | Akira Nishimori & Kōki Onoue | Yukiko Ban, Yuko Iwaoka, Masaki Hinata & Masaru Shindō | July 29, 2025 |
Sakamoto takes Shin and Lu to his physical therapist Granny Miya to get their wounds healed, though Granny Miya warns Sakamoto that his retirement has reduced him to 30% of his original power. At the store, Minimalist attacks Aoi, only to be surprised when she reveals herself to be Nagumo in disguise. Nagumo easily overpowers Minimalist and upon learning he has no information about Slur, decapitates him with a customized multi-tool. Heisuke spots Apart from the Tokyo Tower and attempts to ambush him, starting a fight. Apart quickly overpowers Heisuke, but Sakamoto arrives and rescues him. Sakamoto initially has trouble fighting Apart due his use of wires, and realizes that due to Granny Miya hitting a special pressure point, he cannot burn off his fat at will anymore. He then comes to realize that Granny Miya wants him to learn how to fight at full power with his current body, and manages to force a stalemate with Apart. Elsewhere, Osaragi and Shishiba go to a ramen festival but Osaragi keeps inadvertently ruining all of the ramen Shishiba orders. Shishiba's last bowl of ramen is spilled by the target they are looking for, and he angrily chases him to get revenge.
| 15 | "Round and Round the Tower"; Transliteration: "Guruguru Tawā" (Japanese: ぐるぐるタワー) | Yoshihide Ibata | Akira Nishimori & Yoshihide Ibata | Miyako Kamiya, Masaki Hinata, Yoshinori Deno & Yukiko Ban | August 5, 2025 |
Nagumo and Shishiba realize that Slur intended to have his killers murder each other once they served their purpose. As Sakamoto battles Apart, the killer reveals that due his loneliness as a child, the only way he could feel connected with other people was by killing and dissecting them, starting with his own father. Disgusted by Apart's disregard for human life, Sakamoto beats Apart unconscious with some covert help from Takamura. Shocked that Sakamoto spared his life, Apart informs him that he overheard Slur telling Kashima about the second stage of his plan; with the Order busy tracking down his killers, the JAA itself is now vulnerable to attack. Meanwhile, Slur arrives at the JAA's Kanto branch with one of his men, Gaku. Concerned about Apart's intel, Sakamoto decides to head over to the JAA branch as well to investigate.
| 16 | "Slice Slice Dance"; Transliteration: "Kiri Kiri Mai" (Japanese: 斬斬舞) | Yūki Taki & Shūji Miyahara | Koichi Ohata | Yukiko Ban, Yuko Iwaoka, Masaki Hinata & Yoshinori Deno | August 12, 2025 |
Slur meets with his undercover ally Uda and allows Gaku to wreak havoc in the JAA Kanto branch, killing many JAA assassins until Takamura arrives and gains the upper hand against Gaku. Meanwhile, Sakamoto, Shin, and Apart confront Slur himself, who Sakamoto recognizes as one of his old JCC classmates, Uzuki. Slur easily neutralizes Shin and Apart before confront Sakamoto in a duel taunting him about killing Hana. This enrages Sakamoto and he nearly attacks Slur with deadly force before Shin brings him back to his senses. Takamura arrives, while pursuing Gaku, and Slur has Uda set off a suicide bomb in order to cover their escape. In the aftermath, 176 JAA personnel have been killed in Slur's assault while Takamura has gone missing. As Sakamoto recovers in a hospital, he is visited by Nagumo and Hyo and he tells them about Slur's true identity. After a brief skirmish, Sakamoto is also able to convince Hyo to reveal that clues about Slur can be found in the JCC database. Afterwards, Shin apologizes to Sakamoto for being a burden to him in the battle against Slur, but Sakamoto assures him that he appreciates Shin reminding him of his promise to Aoi. They then prepare to infiltrate the JCC to get the information they need about Slur.
| 17 | "Have a Nice Flight" (Note: Stylized in sentence case) | Yoshihide Ibata & Masaki Watanabe | Kōki Onoue | Miyako Kamiya, Yuko Iwaoka, Yoshinori Deno, Masaki Hinata & Yukiko Ban | August 19, 2025 |
Shishiba and Osaragi oversee the cleanup of the JAA Kanto branch, with Shishiba remarking that JAA will likely have to recall the rest of the Order to deal with Slur. Meanwhile, Slur, Kashima, and Gaku go into hiding, with Slur deciding to recruit more followers to go up against the Order. In order to infiltrate the JCC, Sakamoto and Shin decide to take the school's transfer exam under the guise of student applicants. They board a JCC chartered plane along with other assassin applicants, and are informed by the flight attendant that JCC examiners are hidden among the passengers and each possess special bullets that the applicants must steal in order to pass the first stage of the exam. Weapons are then random distributed to the passengers which triggers an all out brawl. Sakamoto neutralizes several applicants before finding and taking out an examiner and taking his bullets. He offers one to a young female assassin who tried to help him, but she turns it down since she wants to earn her bullet. Elsewhere on the plane, Shin encounters a highly skilled teen assassin named Mafuyu Seba and ends up in a duel with him. Not wanting to be a burden to Sakamoto, Shin decides to use his clairvoyance at full power in order to defeat Seba. Back at Slur's hideout, Gaku recalls Uda promising to go to karaoke with him after he comes back from assignment to infiltrate the JAA, but shrugs it off.
| 18 | "Kanaguri" (Japanese: カナグリ) | Yoshihiro Nishio | Akira Nishimori | Masaki Hinata, Yuko Iwaoka, Yukiko Ban & Miyako Kamiya | August 26, 2025 |
Shin manages to defeat Mafuyu but spares his life and leaves him with one bullet to pass the first stage of the exam. Sakamoto meanwhile teaches the young female assassin, Akira, how to use the machine gun she picked up. Elsewhere on the plane, movie director and Order member Kanaguri is acting as one of the examiners, wanting to record the exploits of the other hitmen on the plane. However, upon hearing Mafuyu insult films as he'd rather watch online videos, Kanaguri is angered and attacks him and Shin, only to be stopped by Sakamoto. Kanaguri then sees Akira and declares her to be the main protagonist of his newest film before destroying the entire plane, sending the surviving candidates falling in the air. The surviving examiners improvise and declare that anybody who has a JCC bullet and survives the fall will be considered to have passed the second stage of the exam. Akira gets an idea and uses her sewing skills to sew her, Sakamoto, Shin, and Mafuyu's shirts together to form a makeshift parachute, which allows them to survive the fall. They then find a discarded JCC bullet on the ground and Sakamoto insists Akira take it as she earned it by saving their lives. As Akira celebrates her victory, Sakamoto wonders what her true identity is, given her superhuman sewing ability.
| 19 | "Exam, Stage Three"; Transliteration: "Sanji Shiken" (Japanese: 三次試験) | Takatoshi Suzuki | Akira Nishimori | Masaki Hinata, Miyako Kamiya & Yoshinori Deno | September 2, 2025 |
Kanaguri witnesses Akira's achievements, but his camera ends up getting destroyed when it falls into the ocean, much to his dismay. Before the third stage of the exam begins, the organizer introduce three new applicants who are allowed to participate on a special recommendation: Shinaya, Toramaru, and Kaji. Toramaru in particular is a big fan of Sakamoto, which puts both him and Shin on their guard. Meanwhile, it is revealed that one of the applicants is one of Slur's new recruits. The organizers then explain the rules of the third exam, where the surviving applicants will be divided into teams and be made to play a game of "tail tag" where they must take as many tails from the other applicants as possible. Sakamoto and Akira end up on the Red Team with amateur assassin Kill Baby while Shin, Mafuyu, and Kaji end up on the White Team. Toramaru swiftly attacks the White Team, and they end up in a faceoff. Meanwhile, Sakamoto notes that Akira possesses highly potent combat skills, but she admits it does not do her much good because she cannot bring herself to hurt other people once she looks them in the eyes. The Red Team is then suddenly ambushed by the Yellow Team, leaving Akira the only member capable of fighting. Wanting to protect her team, Akira falls into a trance and nearly kills the leader of the Yellow Team, and is only stopped by Sakamoto. Realizing Akira's fighting style is familiar, Sakamoto asks for her full name, which she reveals is Akira Akao. This shocks Sakamoto, as Akira shares the same family name as one of his JCC classmates.
| 20 | "Mutual Fans"; Transliteration: "Oshi Kaburi" (Japanese: 推し被り) | Yoshihide Ibata | Naotaka Hayashi & Hirohide Shikishima | Masaki Hinata, Yukiko Ban, Miyako Kamiya, Yuko Iwaoka & Yoshinori Deno | September 9, 2025 |
During their battle, Mafuyu makes an offhand comment insulting Toramaru's obsession with Sakamoto, which angers her. Meanwhile, Akira admits to Sakamoto that she is the niece of his friend Rion Akao, and she decided to join the JCC to look for her. Toramaru continues to pursue the White Team, explaining that she has idolized Sakamoto ever since he saved her life, but stops when she sees Shin has a similar fighting style to Sakamoto, believing he is also a fan of his. However, she quickly gets angry again out of jealousy this time since she wants to be Sakamoto's only fan, and focuses her attacks on Shin. Using his clairvoyance, Shin tricks Toramaru into falling off a cliff into a river, and ends up having to save her from drowning. Seeing that Shin possesses the same kindness Sakamoto has, Toramaru comes to respect Shin until she is suddenly attacked and knocked out by Shinaya, who is actually a cyborg being remotely controlled by Gaku. The examiners arrive to stop Shinaya for breaking the exam rules, but he neutralizes most of them. Shin decides to stand and fight, but realizes he has overused his clairvoyance when Mafuyu and a recovered Toramaru join the fight on his side. Meanwhile, Sakamoto and his team enjoy a cooked meal at their camp to pass the time.
| 21 | "Hard Mode"; Transliteration: "Hādo Mōdo" (Japanese: ハードモード) | Masaki Watanabe | Koichi Ohata | Masaki Hinata, Yuko Iwaoka, Masaru Shindō; Yoshinori Deno & Miyako Kamiya | September 16, 2025 |
Shin, Mafuyu, and Toramaru team up to battle Shinaya, but they're no match for Gaku's fighting skills and all three of them are put on the backfoot. Meanwhile, Kaji watches the battle, too afraid to get involved. However, his advanced hearing allows him to determine that Shinaya is actually comatose, with his body being remote controlled. Shin reads Kaji's mind and assures him that he should overcome his insecurities and fight. With his hearing, Kaji is able to perceive the lag time between Gaku's commands and Shinaya's actions, allowing him to dodge his moves. Shin decides to push his limits and activate his full power, even though he has already used up his allotted five minutes for the day. Reading Kaji's mind, Shin is also able to fight on equal terms against Shinaya. Seeing he is about to lose, Gaku disregards the limits of Shinaya's body and fights at full power, easily defeating Shin and Kaji. Sakamoto then intervenes, allowing Shin to escape with Kaji. Angered at how his friends have been hurt, Sakamoto savagely beats down Shinaya and defeats him, with Gaku learning how dangerous Sakamoto is.
| 22 | "Each One's Mission"; Transliteration: "Sorezore no Misshon" (Japanese: それぞれのミッション) | Daisuke Nakajima | Akira Nishimori & Masaki Watanabe | Masaki Hinata, Yukiko Ban & Yuko Iwaoka | September 23, 2025 |
With Shinaya defeated, the surviving examiners decide to end the exam early, with the surviving applicants given a passing grade, though Toramaru is shocked to see Sakamoto has grown fat. However, as the applicants are being sent home, Mafuyu and Toramaru are kidnapped by Kanaguri and Carolina Reaper, who are both working for Slur. Slur approaches the two young assassins and asks them to join his cause to destroy the JAA for "justice". Meanwhile, Nagumo, Shishiba, and Osaragi are given an assignment to Kyoto to investigate Slur's latest murder. At the store, Shin receives a notification that he has passed at the top of his class, though Sakamoto is barred from passing due to a standing rule that individuals with bounties on their heads cannot attend the JCC. Nagumo then appears and offers to give Sakamoto a temporary disguise so he can enter the JCC as a teacher. When the school year starts, Akira has trouble adjusting to the cutthroat nature of the JCC, but ends up being helped by the disguised Sakamoto. Shin takes the chance to experience what it's like being in a school before resuming his mission access the JCC's database.

== Home media release ==
=== Japanese ===
Avex Pictures (Japan – Region 2/A)
| Vol. | Episodes | Cover character(s) | Release date | Ref. |
|---|---|---|---|---|
| 1 | 1–3 | Taro Sakamoto | March 26, 2025 | |
| 2 | 4–7 | Shin Asakura, Lu Shaotang and Heisuke Mashimo | April 30, 2025 | |
| 3 | 8–11 | Yoichi Nagumo | May 28, 2025 | |
| 4 | 12–14 | Shishiba and Osaragi | September 24, 2025 | |
| 5 | 15–18 | Hyo and Takamura | October 29, 2025 | |
| 6 | 19–22 | Kei Uzuki / X and Gaku | November 26, 2025 | |

== Reception ==
Allen Moody of THEM Anime Reviews praised the anime adaptation for its humorous premise and execution, highlighting Sakamoto's exaggerated skills and the energetic contrast provided by supporting characters Shin and Lu. The villains were also well received, though Moody noted that the season ended on an unresolved note and expressed anticipation for a second part. Joshua Fox of Screen Rant was surprised by Tomokazu Sugita's initial confession that he did not want to voice Sakamoto during recording of the series until he realized how helpful the character is to the rest of the cast. This led to comparisons between Sakamoto and Sugita's previous role, Gintoki Sakata from Gintama, as both protagonists help several supporting characters who later begin to "heal" him while living together. Fox noted that they were different, as Sakamoto "is someone who strives to be kind to others far more directly and far more often than" Gintoki. Jairus Taylor of Anime News Network in particular praised Sakamoto's fight scene in the anime's ninth episode for mixing comedy with violence properly, as Kashima forced the protagonist to bring his full potential and was constantly overpowered in comical fashions. Jack Harper of Collider noted that while Sakamoto is a strong ex-killer, his family represents his humanity, carrying a message of redemption more positive than those found in Batman stories among Hollywood action movies with which the character is associated. The writer also noted that Sakamoto's physical transformation exacerbated his internal conflict about which aspect of his life is more important during combat, as the series "doesn't associate ripped abs and bulging muscles with the 'peak male form'" of Hollywood's "unrealistic" body standards. Sakamoto's believes of redemption are passed through his assistant Shin, who starts following the same rules as him. However, Taylor did not find the backstory of Shin appealing even if his relationship with the scientist who accidentally gave him his powers might be compelling.

ThatNerdyBoliviane of Anime Feminist was initially worried about how exactly Sakamoto's relationship with his wife was played in regards to how much Aoi knows of her husband's actions and how much development it would have while watching the series premiere. Both Polygon and FandomWire in particular liked the romantic scenes between Sakamoto and Aoi before they get married, as the latter does a ridiculous move, risking her own life, to prove to the former that deaths should be avoided if they want to continue their relationship, proving in particular how much Sakamoto's characterization was explored in a single scene despite the present one not being that talkative in comparison. In a later episode, Aoi's shock at hearing from Sakamoto that he is fighting again because there is a bounty on his head was well executed, as the wife reminds her husband that the family should not keep secrets from each other. This handling of the relationship was praised by Petrana Radulovic of Polygon for making the story more "grounded", as it feels more realistic despite having experience with other series like Spy × Family, whose trio of protagonists always hide each other's secrets.

Isaac Rouse, also writing for Screen Rant, called the series an "average action-comedy" that "doesn't live up to the hype", noting that while the central premise and Sakamoto's character design are solid, the story "tends to meander" with a slow pace and lacks a compelling overarching conflict. He stated that the forced humor between the main trio "falls flat" compared to side characters like Boiled and Obiguro, while criticizing the cast's repetitive, disproportionate character models, concluding that the show lacks staying power and left him "completely unimpressed." John Serba of Decider called the show "insubstantial and disappointingly formulaic", noting that while the premiere is "undeniably energetic, fast-paced, loony in tone and visually appealing", its "tired-ass premise" leaves little room for story and features characters that fail to "leave much of an impression", and stating that it struggles to establish a compelling hook beyond its "extreme cartoon violence" and Odd Couple dynamic, concluding that it "struggles to cut through the chaff" of streaming anime and recommending viewers "SKIP IT."

Sakamoto Days was Netflix's global most-watched anime in the first half of 2025, garnering 24.4 million views according to the platform's mid-year report.

=== Accolades ===
| Award | Date of ceremony | Category | Recipient(s) | Result | Ref. |
|---|---|---|---|---|---|
| 10th Crunchyroll Anime Awards | May 23, 2026 | Best New Series | Sakamoto Days | Nominated | |
| 10th Crunchyroll Anime Awards | May 23, 2026 | Best Voice Artist Performance (Arabic) | Tariq Obaid as Taro Sakamoto | Won | |
| 10th Crunchyroll Anime Awards | May 23, 2026 | Best Voice Artist Performance (Arabic) | Moataz El-Shazly as Heisuke Mashimo | Nominated | |
| 10th Crunchyroll Anime Awards | May 23, 2026 | Best Voice Artist Performance (Arabic) | Fatima Zakaria as Osaragi | Nominated | |
| Astra TV Awards | June 10, 2025 | Best Supporting Voice-Over Performance | Xolo Maridueña as Heisuke Mashimo | Nominated | |
| Astra TV Awards | August 15, 2026 | Best Anime Series | Sakamoto Days | Nominated | |
| Music Awards Japan | June 13, 2026 | Best Original Score for Animation | Yuki Hayashi | Nominated | |
