= Sakamoto Days =

Japanese manga series and its adaptations

- First tankōbon volume cover, featuring Taro Sakamoto (front) and Shin Asakura (back)
- Genre: Action comedy
- Manga
- Written by: Yuto Suzuki
- Published by: Shueisha
- English publisher: NA: Viz Media
- Imprint: Jump Comics
- Magazine: Weekly Shōnen Jump
- Original run: November 21, 2020 – November 23, 2026
- Volumes: 29
- Novel

Sakamoto Days: Assassin's Method
- Written by: Renka Misaki
- Illustrated by: Yuto Suzuki
- Published by: Shueisha
- English publisher: NA: Viz Media
- Imprint: Jump J-Books
- Published: April 4, 2023
- Manga

Sakamoto Holidays
- Written by: Tetsu Ōkawa
- Published by: Shueisha
- English publisher: NA: Viz Media
- Magazine: Saikyō Jump
- Original run: July 4, 2024 – present
- Volumes: 4
- Live-action film
- Directed by: Yūichi Fukuda
- Written by: Yūichi Fukuda
- Studio: Credeus; Avex Pictures
- Released: April 29, 2026
- Anime television series
- Sakamoto Days (2025–present)
- icon

Sakamoto Days (stylized in all caps) is a Japanese manga series written and illustrated by Yuto Suzuki. It has been serialized in Shueisha's shōnen manga magazine Weekly Shōnen Jump since November 2020, with its chapters collected in 29 tankōbon volumes as of November 2026. It is simultaneously published in English by Viz Media and the Manga Plus online platform.

The story revolves around Taro Sakamoto, a retired legendary hitman who has settled into a quiet and mundane life as a family man. However, his peaceful life is disrupted when former enemies and colleagues from his hitman days come seeking revenge. To protect his family and loved ones, Sakamoto must use his exceptional combat skills to face off against a variety of adversaries while trying to maintain his ordinary facade.

An anime television series adaptation produced by TMS Entertainment aired from January to March 2025, with a second cours aired from July to September of the same year. A second season is set to premiere in January 2027. A live-action film adaptation premiered in Japan in April 2026.

By August 2026, the manga had over 18 million copies in circulation.

== Plot ==
Taro Sakamoto used to be an unrivaled hitman, earning legendary status in the criminal underworld by being feared by some and idolized by others. One day, however, Sakamoto fell in love at first sight with Aoi, a convenience store clerk. For them to date, Aoi gave him the ultimatum that he must quit being a hitman and never kill again. Sakamoto agreed, and after his retirement, they started dating, got married, had a daughter named Hana, and eventually opened a family-run convenience store of their own in the suburbs of Tokyo.

Several years later, Sakamoto has settled into his humble life, but also grown portly as a result of his relative inactivity despite still being immensely powerful. The world of hitmen eventually locates him, and many soon attempt to target the Sakamoto family, either seeking revenge or resenting his retired status. Now, with the help of three other former criminals who become employed at the store under Sakamoto—clairvoyant hitman Shin Asakura, orphaned crime boss daughter Lu Xiaotang, and sniper Heisuke Mashimo—Sakamoto must protect his family (or die trying) against the criminal underworld, all while maintaining Aoi's no-kill policy.

== Production ==
Editor Soushiro Ishikawa stated that pairing Taro Sakamoto with Shin, a mind-reading character, provided insight into Sakamoto's motivations and allowed the manga to flourish with comedy, since the author, Yuto Suzuki, intended for Sakamoto to be a quiet, reserved character. According to Ishikawa, Suzuki focuses on readability while creating action scenes, and his background in Nihonga style of painting allows him to create interesting layouts. Suzuki and Ishikawa would hold meetings every week in person to discuss how to progress the story, but after the COVID-19 pandemic, they hold meetings online. Suzuki was influenced by manga artists Katsuhiro Otomo, Takehiko Inoue, and Hiroya Oku, and by the works of director Christopher Nolan. He was also inspired by action films such as The Equalizer and the John Wick series.

Suzuki originally drew dark one-shot stories. However, when creating Sakamoto Days, he opted for a more lighthearted tone to better suit the demands of weekly serialization. For the concept of Sakamoto being a retired hitman, Suzuki said he was fascinated with the idea of a fat person being incredibly strong, thinking as well about the reasons that led him to that state; "Why is he fat? Because he retired. Why is that? Maybe because he got married? That's how I made it." He was particularly intrigued by the idea of a strong, obese fighter, a notion that was partly influenced by the comedic action film Enter the Fat Dragon. Regarding action scenes, Suzuki strives to captivate readers by incorporating unexpected twists and surprises. He employs an analog pen for character illustrations and works with a team of assistants. Shin emerged from Suzuki's interest in exploring the potential of an esper who interacts with Sakamoto through telepathy. Meanwhile, Lu was conceived as a Chinese assassin heroine, reflecting Suzuki's desire to diversify the cast. Although Suzuki acknowledges that his characters can sometimes be difficult to distinguish visually, he found Gaku to be the easiest to draw due his independent personality. Suzuki commented that he had already planned the ending of the series by 2022. The series started its "final battle" on August 4, 2025. On July 21, 2026, it was announced that the series was heading to its climax.

== Media ==
=== Manga ===
Yuto Suzuki first published a one-shot titled Sakamoto (SAKAMOTO-サカモト-) in Shueisha's Jump Giga on December 26, 2019. Sakamoto Days debuted in Shueisha's shōnen manga magazine Weekly Shōnen Jump on November 21, 2020. The final chapter was published digitally on November 23, 2026. Shueisha has collected its chapters into individual tankōbon volumes. The first volume was released on April 2, 2021. As of November, 2026, 29 volumes have been released.

The series is simultaneously published in English by Viz Media and the Manga Plus online platform. Viz Media started releasing the volumes in print on April 5, 2022.

A spin-off manga by Tetsu Ōkawa, who has worked as an assistant on the main manga, titled Sakamoto Holidays, started in Shueisha's Saikyō Jump on July 4, 2024. In November 2026, it was announced that the manga was reaching its climax. The first tankōbon volume was released on January 4, 2025. In June 2025, Viz Media announced that it will start publishing the volumes in both physical and digital format starting in Q2 2026.

=== Novels ===
A novel adaptation with an exclusive story by Renka Misaki, titled Sakamoto Days: Assassin's Method (SAKAMOTO DAYS 殺し屋のメソッド, Sakamoto Deizu: Koroshiya no Mesoddo), was released under Shueisha's Jump J-Books imprint on April 4, 2023. In October 2025, Viz Media announced that it had licensed the novel for English-language publication, which was released on July 28, 2026.

A spin-off novel with exclusive episodes again written by Renka Misaki, titled Sakamoto Days: Assassin's Blues (SAKAMOTO DAYS 殺し屋ブルース, Sakamoto Deizu: Koroshiya Burūsu), was released on December 4, 2024. Viz Media licensed the novel and is set to release on November 24, 2026.

=== Anime ===
The manga received an anime television series adaptation produced by TMS Entertainment. The first season was directed by Masaki Watanabe, with scripts by Taku Kishimoto, character designs by Yō Moriyama, and music composed by Yuki Hayashi. It ran in two split cours, with the first cours aired from January 11 to March 22, 2025, and the second cours aired from July 15 to September 23 of the same year, on TV Tokyo and its affiliates. (Note: TV Tokyo listed the second cours premiere as airing on July 14 at 24:00, which is effectively July 15 at midnight JST.) Netflix licensed the series for a worldwide streaming release, which was released simultaneously with its televised broadcast in Japan.

In December 2025, at the Jump Festa '26 event, a second season was announced. Daisuke Nakajima will direct the second season, with Watanabe, serving as supervising director. It is set to premiere on January 19, 2027. (Note: TV Tokyo listed the series premiere date on January 18 at 24:00, which is effectively January 19 at midnight)

=== Live-action film ===
In September 2025, it was announced that the manga would receive a live-action film adaptation. It premiered in Japan on April 29, 2026. The film was written and directed by Yūichi Fukuda, with Keiya Tabuchi directing the action, and stars Ren Meguro as Taro Sakamoto. Credeus produced the film with Avex Pictures and was distributed by Toho. The film's theme song is "Bang!!", performed by Snow Man. The film is set to premiere worldwide on Amazon Prime Video on October 30, 2026.

=== Other media ===
A promotional video for the manga's eighteenth volume, starring Saori Izawa in the role of a store clerk, was released on August 2, 2024.

A smartphone game developed by Goodroid, titled Sakamoto Days: Dangerous Puzzle (SAKAMOTO DAYS デンジャラスパズル, Sakamoto Deizu: Denjarasu Pazuru), was released on April 2, 2025.

== Reception ==
=== Manga ===
By October 2022, the manga had 2.2 million copies in circulation; over 4 million copies in circulation by November 2023; over 5 million copies in circulation by May 2024; over 5.5 million copies in circulation by August 2024; over 7 million copies in circulation by December 2024; over 8 million copies in circulation by March 2025; over 12 million copies in circulation by June 2025; over 15 million copies in circulation by August 2025; and over 18 million copies in circulation by August 2026.

The series ranked sixth on the Nationwide Bookstore Employees' Recommended Comics of 2022. Manga author Hiromu Arakawa recommended the series with a comment featured on the obi of the sixth volume. Sakamoto Days was nominated for Best Print Manga at the 2021 Next Manga Awards. It placed sixth out of 50 nominees, but won the U-Next Prize. The series was nominated for the 68th Shogakukan Manga Award in the shōnen category in 2022.

Katherine Dacey of The Manga Critic recommended the first volume, praising its artwork and fight choreography. She noted that while some later chapters were not as tightly executed as the initial ones, the series successfully balanced character development with action. Anime News Network's Rebecca Silverman gave a positive review, describing the first volume as highly entertaining, with a strong cast, an engaging premise, and effective execution. Sheena McNeil of Sequential Tart observed that the premise could appeal to fans of Kousuke Oono's The Way of the Househusband, while its tone resembled the action-comedy blend of Akira Toriyama's earlier works. McNeil found the protagonist's familial relationships and dynamic with Shin particularly engaging.

Reiichi Narima of Real Sound noted that despite the protagonist's comedic appearance, he called Sakamoto Days an entertaining action series with superbly illustrated action scenes, which he compared to those in Katsuhiro Otomo's Akira. He observed that the series began with a comedic focus but gradually shifted toward battles, aligning it more with a standard Weekly Shōnen Jump title.

=== Live-action film ===
The live-action film adaptation premiered fourth at the Japanese box office, selling 346,000 tickets and earning 478 million yen in three days. During the Golden Week holidays, it sold 1.14 million tickets, earning 1.5 billion yen.
