= Raul (entertainer) =

Japanese singer and TV personality (born 2003)

- ラウール
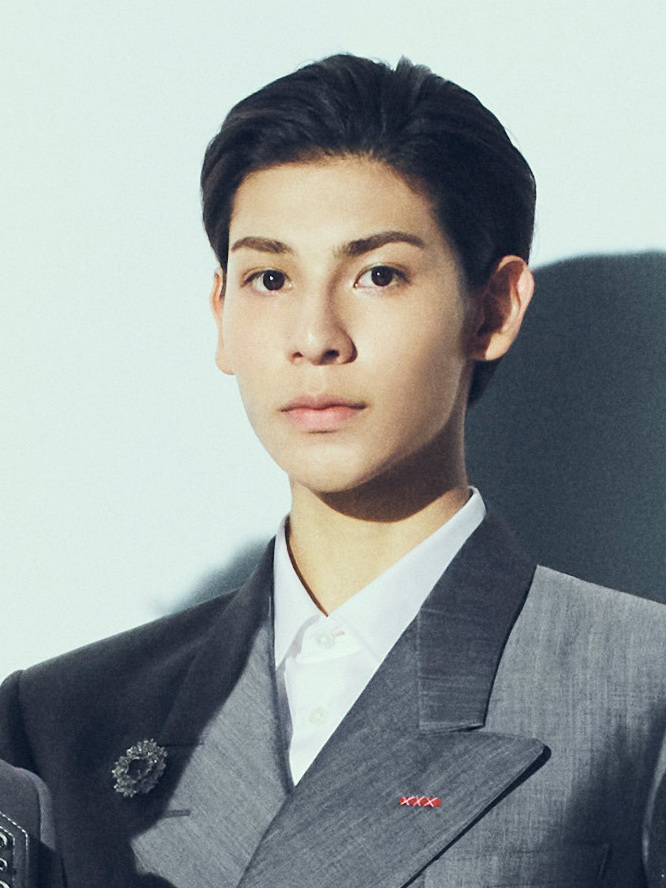
- Born: Maito Raul Murakami; 27 June 2003 (age 23); Tokyo, Japan
- Occupations: TV personality; actor; model
- Years active: 2015 to present
- Agent(s): Starto Entertainment, Bananas Models
- Height: 192 cm (6 ft 3 1/2 in)
- Website: starto.jp, bananasmodels.com

Maito Raul Murakami (村上真都ラウール, Murakami Maito Raul; born 27 June 2003), also known by his stage name Raul (ラウール), is a Japanese singer, actor, model, and TV personality. Raul is a member of idol group Snow Man under Starto Entertainment (formerly known as Johnny & Associates). On 21 June 2024, Raul announced to become a professional model signed to Bananas Models.

== Biography ==
Raul was born in Tokyo. He joined Johnny & Associates in May 2015. In June 2018, he was chosen to be a member of Chibiko Ninja (later known as Shounen Ninja), a new pre-debut unit under Junior, a branch of Johnny & Associates that manages trainees and their activities.

On January 17, 2019, Raul was added as a new member to Snow Man, an existing Junior unit, in addition to Koji Mukai and Ren Meguro. Snow Man made their official debut on January 22, 2020. Corresponding to his debut, Raul withdrew from Shounen Ninja.

In 2021, Raul co-starred with Ai Yoshikawa for the live action film adaptation of the manga series "Honey Lemon Soda" in his first leading role outside of Snow Man related projects.

In June 2022, Raul debuted at Paris Fashion Week for the Yohji Yamamoto POUR HOMME Spring/Summer 2023 Collection.

== Personal life ==
Raul is of Venezuelan and Japanese descent. In April 2022, it was revealed that Raul had graduated from high school and enrolled at Waseda University in the Department of Health Sciences and Social Welfare.

== Filmography ==
=== TV dramas ===
Year	Title	Role	Network	Notes	Ref.
2019	Please do not attempt, never.	Terusu	NHK	Supporting Role	
2019	Kantan na Oshigoto desu. Ni obo shite Mita.	Hyakuhon Gou "Momo"	NTV	Lead Role	
2025	Aino Gakkou。 Learning to Love	Takamori Taiga / Kaoru	Fuji TV Network	Lead Role	

=== Films ===
Year	Title	Role	Distributor	Notes	Ref.
2019	Shounentachi	Performer	Shochiku	Guest role	
2020	Takizawa Kabuki ZERO 2020: The Movie	Himself	Shochiku	Lead role	
2021	Honey Lemon Soda	Kai Miura	Shochiku	Lead role	
2022	Mr. Osomatsu	Todomatsu Matsuno	Toho	Lead role	
2024	Honeko Akabane's Bodyguards	Arakuni Ibuki		Main role	

== Discography ==
- Yume (single) (with Alan Walker) (release: November 20, 2026)
