= Nagareboshi Lens =

Manga and direct-to-video anime

流れ星レンズ (Nagareboshi Renzu)
- Genre: Romance
- Manga
- Written by: Mayu Murata
- Published by: Shueisha
- Magazine: Ribon
- Original run: 2011 – July 3, 2014
- Volumes: 10
- Original video animation
- Written by: Natsuko Takahashi
- Music by: Asuka Sakai
- Studio: Kinema Citrus
- Released: March 18, 2012
- Runtime: 18 minutes

Nagareboshi Lens (流れ星レンズ, Nagareboshi Renzu; "Shooting Star Lens") is a Japanese slice of life romance shōjo manga series written and illustrated by Mayu Murata. It began serialization in Shueisha's Ribon manga magazine in 2011 and ended on July 3, 2014; a total of 10 volumes were published. An original video animation adaptation was released in 2012.

== Characters ==
- Risa is the main female protagonist who has no experience in love. Once when her best friend, Yuko, tells Risa about her boyfriend and herself (and about how she saw her boyfriend sparkle and she knew he was her 'first' love), Risa starts to get interested in love and wants to experience and know about it. She then meets Yūgure and falls in love with him at first sight. When she confesses to him, he returns her feelings and they start going out with each other. Risa really cares for the others and is the only child in her family.
- Yūgure is the most popular boy in his grade. He is usually seen playing football with his friends, which is hinted to be his favorite sport. He seems to be nice to everyone and has no experience in love. When Yūgure first saw Risa, he stated that she is "cute" and then they started dating.
- Yuko is Risa's best friend who has been together since elementary school. Yuko cares a lot for Risa and supports her romantic life.

== Volumes ==
- 1 (August 11, 2011)
- 2 (December 15, 2011)
- 3 (March 15, 2012)
- 4 (August 10, 2012)
- 5 (December 14, 2012)
- 6 (April 15, 2013)
- 7 (August 9, 2013)
- 8 (December 13, 2013)
- 9 (April 15, 2014)
- 10 (September 12, 2014)

== Reception ==
Volume 6 reached the 41st place on the weekly Oricon manga chart and, as of April 20, 2013, has sold 28,249 copies; volume 9 reached the 25th place and, as of April 20, 2014, has sold 34,763 copies; volume 10 reached the 35th place and, as of September 21, 2014, has sold 52,454 copies.

It was nominated for Best Children's Manga at the 38th Kodansha Manga Awards.

== See also ==
- Honey Lemon Soda, another manga series by Mayu Murata
