= Honey Lemon Soda =

Japanese manga series

- First tankōbon volume cover

ハニーレモンソーダ (Hanī Remon Sōda)
- Genre: Romance; Comedy drama
- Manga
- Written by: Mayu Murata
- Published by: Shueisha
- English publisher: NA: Yen Press
- Imprint: Ribon Mascot Comics
- Magazine: Ribon
- Original run: December 28, 2015 – April 3, 2026
- Volumes: 31 + 1 extra
- Live-action film
- Directed by: Kōji Shintoku
- Written by: Nami Kikkawa
- Music by: Erika Fukasawa
- Studio: Office Crescendo
- Released: July 9, 2021
- Runtime: 111 minutes
- Anime television series
- Directed by: Hiroshi Nishikiori
- Written by: Akiko Waba
- Music by: Akira Kosemura
- Studio: J.C.Staff (animation); TMS Entertainment (production and planning) (Note: Under the "Unlimited Produce by TMS" label.)
- Licensed by: Crunchyroll (streaming); SEA: Plus Media Networks Asia
- Original network: Fuji TV (+Ultra), BS Fuji
- Original run: January 9, 2025 – March 27, 2025
- Episodes: 12
- icon

Honey Lemon Soda (Japanese: ハニーレモンソーダ, Hepburn: Hanī Remon Sōda) is a Japanese manga series written and illustrated by Mayu Murata. It was serialized in Shueisha's shōjo manga magazine Ribon from December 2015 to April 2026, with its chapters collected into 31 tankōbon volumes. A live action film adaptation was released in July 2021, and an anime television series adaptation produced by TMS Entertainment and animated by J.C.Staff aired from January to March 2025 on Fuji TV's +Ultra programming block.

By July 2024, the series had over 13 million copies in circulation.

== Plot ==
Quiet and shy high school girl Uka Ishimori has been nicknamed "stone" since middle school. Upon entering Hachimitsu High School, she meets a boy named Kai Miura, whose appearance and personality reminds her of lemon soda. As the two become acquainted with one another, Uka's relationship with Kai inspires her to become more confident, make more friends at school, and realize she has fallen in love with him.

== Characters ==
Uka Ishimori (石森 羽花, Ishimori Uka)
Voiced by: Kana Ichinose (Japanese); Monica Flatley (English)
Portrayed by: Ai Yoshikawa
A timid and shy 15-year-old high school girl with a history of being bullied during middle school, and being nicknamed "stone" for never having the courage to stand up for herself. She falls in love with Miura, who constantly helps her come out of her shell, make new friends and gain a newfound sense of confidence in herself.
Kai Miura (三浦 界, Miura Kai)
Voiced by: Shōgo Yano (Japanese); Chris Hackney (English)
Portrayed by: Raul
A handsome and popular high school boy with lemon hair, who is Serina's ex-boyfriend and Ishimori's love interest. At first glance, he may appear as indifferent, passive aggressive and even cold towards Ishimori and others, but in reality, he's a kind and compassionate person who is always helping Ishimori gain confidence and enjoy her high school life with her new friends. Though initially in denial, Miura eventually realizes he is in love with Ishimori, and they begin dating.
Serina Kanno (菅野 芹奈, Kanno Serina)
Voiced by: Rie Takahashi (Japanese); Ezra Vervin (English)
Portrayed by: Mayu Hotta
A beautiful and popular high school girl and Miura's ex-girlfriend. She is constantly the target of many boys' affection, which led to several female students in middle school turning on her out of jealousy. She is a kind, caring and compassionate girl who understands Ishimori's struggles with the fear of being alone, and becomes close friends with her.
Ayumi Endo (遠藤 あゆみ, Endō Ayumi)
Voiced by: Miyari Nemoto (Japanese); Celeste Perez (English)
Portrayed by: Natsumi Okamoto
A fun-loving, cheerful and caring girl, and Uka's best friend.
Tomoya Takamine (高嶺 友哉, Takamine Tomoya)
Voiced by: Shun'ichi Toki (Japanese); Landon McDonald (English)
Portrayed by: Tatsuomi Hamada
Satoru Seto (瀬戸 悟, Seto Satoru)
Voiced by: Taku Yashiro (Japanese); Kieran Regan (English)
Portrayed by: Ryōta Bandō

== Media ==
=== Manga ===
Written and illustrated by Mayu Murata, Honey Lemon Soda was serialized in Shueisha's shōjo manga magazine Ribon from December 28, 2015, to April 3, 2026. As of May 2026, 31 tankōbon volumes have been released. Two side stories tankōbon has also been released.

In July 2022, Yen Press announced that they licensed the series for English publication.

==== Volumes ====
No.	Original release date	Original ISBN	English release date	English ISBN
1	May 25, 2016	978-4-08-867416-2	January 17, 2023	978-1-9753-6331-4
2	September 23, 2016	978-4-08-867431-5	May 23, 2023	978-1-9753-6333-8
3	January 25, 2017	978-4-08-867443-8	August 22, 2023	978-1-9753-6335-2
4	April 25, 2017	978-4-08-867459-9	November 21, 2023	978-1-9753-6337-6
5	August 25, 2017	978-4-08-867470-4	March 19, 2024	978-1-9753-6339-0
6	December 25, 2017	978-4-08-867483-4	July 23, 2024	978-1-9753-6341-3
7	April 25, 2018	978-4-08-867497-1	October 15, 2024	978-1-9753-6343-7
8	August 24, 2018	978-4-08-867510-7	February 18, 2025	978-1-9753-6345-1
9	December 25, 2018	978-4-08-867524-4	June 24, 2025	978-1-9753-6347-5
10	April 25, 2019	978-4-08-867545-9	September 23, 2025	978-1-9753-6349-9
11	August 23, 2019	978-4-08-867558-9	April 28, 2026	978-1-9753-6351-2
12	December 25, 2019	978-4-08-867571-8	October 27, 2026	978-1-9753-6353-6
13	April 24, 2020	978-4-08-867582-4	March 23, 2027	978-1-9753-6355-0
14	August 25, 2020	978-4-08-867595-4	—	—
15	December 24, 2020	978-4-08-867609-8	—	—
16	April 23, 2021	978-4-08-867616-6	—	—
17	July 21, 2021	978-4-08-867628-9	—	—
SS	July 21, 2021	978-4-08-867629-6	—	—
18	November 25, 2021	978-4-08-867639-5	—	—
19	March 25, 2022	978-4-08-867653-1	—	—
20	July 25, 2022	978-4-08-867672-2	—	—
21	November 25, 2022	978-4-08-867687-6	—	—
22	March 24, 2023	978-4-08-867708-8	—	—
23	July 25, 2023	978-4-08-867721-7	—	—
24	November 24, 2023	978-4-08-867737-8	—	—
25	April 24, 2024	978-4-08-867749-1	—	—
26	August 23, 2024	978-4-08-867771-2	—	—
27	December 24, 2024	978-4-08-867784-2	—	—
28	April 24, 2025	978-4-08-867798-9	—	—
29	August 25, 2025	978-4-08-867813-9	—	—
30	December 24, 2025	978-4-08-867828-3	—	—
31	May 25, 2026	978-4-08-867843-6	—	—
AS	June 25, 2026	978-4-08-867844-3	—	—

=== Live-action film ===
In September 2020, it was announced that the series would be getting a live action film adaptation, starring Snow Man member Raul as Kai Miura and Ai Yoshikawa as Uka Ishimori. The film was produced by Office Crescendo and directed by Kōji Shintoku, based on a screenplay by Nami Kikkawa, with music composed by Erika Fukasawa. Shochiku released the film in Japan on July 9, 2021. Snow Man performed the film's theme song "Hello Hello".

=== Anime ===
An anime television series adaptation was announced on March 1, 2024. Produced and planned by TMS Entertainment, it is animated by J.C.Staff and directed by Hiroshi Nishikiori, with Akiko Waba writing series scripts, Aimi Tanaka designing the characters, and Akira Kosemura composing the music. The series aired from January 9 to March 27, 2025, on Fuji TV's +Ultra programming block. (Note: Fuji TV listed the series premiere on January 8 at 24:55, which is effectively January 9 at 12:55 a.m. JST.) The opening theme song is "Magic Hour" and the ending theme song is "Wonderful World", both performed by &Team. Crunchyroll is streaming the series. Plus Media Networks Asia has licensed the series in Southeast Asia and broadcast it on Aniplus Asia.

==== Episodes ====
No.	Title	Directed by	Written by	Storyboarded by	Original release date
1	"Because I Met You"; Transliteration: "Kimi ni Deaeta kara" (Japanese: 君に出会えたから)	Hiroshi Nishikori	Akiko Waba	Hiroshi Nishikori	January 9, 2025
2	"Turning Into a Treasure"; Transliteration: "Takaramono ni Kawatteku" (Japanese: 宝物に変わってく)	Shizuka Izumi	Akiko Waba	Shizuka Izumi & Hiroshi Nishikori	January 16, 2025
3	"Our Little Secret"; Transliteration: "Futari dake no Himitsu" (Japanese: 二人だけの秘密)	Kōzō Kaihō	Akiko Waba	Hiroaki Sakurai	January 23, 2025
4	"However Distant We May Be"; Transliteration: "Donna ni Hanareteite mo" (Japanese: どんなに離れていても)	Hiroshi Nishikiori	Akiko Waba	Nagisa Miyazaki & Hiroshi Nishikiori	January 30, 2025
5	"A Great Person"; Transliteration: "Suteki na Hito" (Japanese: 素敵な人)	Shizuka Izumi	Seishi Minakami	Yoshiki Yamakawa	February 6, 2025
6	"In the Future, Too..."; Transliteration: "Kono Saki mo, Zutto..." (Japanese: この先も、ずっと...)	Kiyotaka Ohata	Seishi Minakami	Kiyotaka Ohata	February 13, 2025
7	"I'm Sorry I Love Him"; Transliteration: "Suki de Gomennasai" (Japanese: 好きでごめんなさい)	Masamune Okamura	Seishi Minakami	Risako Yoshida	February 20, 2025
8	"Summon the Courage"; Transliteration: "Yūki o Dashite" (Japanese: 勇気を出して)	Shizuka Izumi	Akiko Waba	Kouichi Takada	February 27, 2025
9	"Goodbye, Bumbling Self"; Transliteration: "Sayōnara Bukiyō datta Watashi" (Japanese: さようなら不器用だった私)	Yutaka Yamamoto	Seishi Minakami	Yutaka Yamamoto	March 6, 2025
10	"The Side of You No One Knows"; Transliteration: "Dare mo Shiranai-kun" (Japanese: 誰も知らない君)	Kōzō Kaihō	Akiko Waba	Koichi Takada & Shizuka Izumi	March 13, 2025
11	"Feelings Burst Free"; Transliteration: "Omoi, Hajikete" (Japanese: 想い、弾けて)	Kiyotaka Ohata	Seishi Minakami	Kiyotaka Ohata	March 20, 2025
12	"Honey Lemon Soda"; Transliteration: "Hanī Remon Sōda" (Japanese: ハニーレモンソーダ)	Hiroyasu Oda	Akiko Waba	Yoshiki Yamakawa	March 27, 2025

== Reception ==
By July 2024, Honey Lemon Soda had over 13 million copies in circulation.

In 2021, the series was nominated at the 45th Kodansha Manga Awards in the shōjo category. It also ranked 40th in Da Vinci magazine's "Book of the Year" list for that year. In 2026, the anime adaptation was nominated for Best Romance at the 10th Crunchyroll Anime Awards. It was also nominated in the Daruma for Best Romance Anime category at the Japan Expo Awards in the same year.

== See also ==
- Nagareboshi Lens, another manga series by Mayu Murata
