= Honeko Akabane's Bodyguards =

Japanese manga series

- First tankōbon volume cover

赤羽骨子のボディガード (Akabane Honeko no Bodigādo)
- Genre: Action; Romantic comedy
- Manga
- Written by: Masamitsu Nigatsu
- Published by: Kodansha
- English publisher: Kodansha (digital); NA: Kodansha USA
- Imprint: Shōnen Magazine Comics
- Magazine: Weekly Shōnen Magazine
- Original run: September 21, 2022 – November 20, 2024
- Volumes: 12
- Live-action film
- Directed by: Junichi Ishikawa
- Written by: Hiroyuki Yatsu
- Music by: Yutaka Yamada
- Released: August 2, 2024
- Runtime: 117 minutes
- icon

Honeko Akabane's Bodyguards (Japanese: 赤羽骨子のボディガード, Hepburn: Akabane Honeko no Bodigādo) is a Japanese manga series written and illustrated by Masamitsu Nigatsu. It has been serialized in Kodansha's shōnen manga magazine Weekly Shōnen Magazine from September 2022 to November 2024, with its chapters collected in twelve tankōbon volumes. A live-action film adaptation premiered in Japanese theaters in August 2024.

== Plot ==
Honeko Akabane and Ibuki Arakuni have been childhood friends since they were kids. Ibuki harbors feelings for Honeko and is fiercely protective of her, often leading to fights. Honeko always scolds him for his recklessness but is deeply grateful for his presence, as she feels safe around him. Ibuki's unwavering determination to protect Honeko stems from his knowledge of her true heritage. She is the daughter of a powerful yakuza organization and destined to be its next leader after her father's death. Due to this, rival organizations are plotting to eliminate her, even hiring professional assassins. To keep Honeko safe, she was adopted by a lawyer's family, concealing her yakuza connections. Ibuki became her bodyguard for a year, although he is not alone; all their friends and classmates were also assigned as Honeko's bodyguards. The story follows the daily lives of Class 3–4 as they protect Honeko without her knowledge, while also exploring the budding romance between Honeko and Ibuki.

== Characters ==
Arakuni Ibuki (威吹荒邦, Ibuki Arakuni)
Portrayed by: Raul
Honeko Akabane (赤羽骨子, Akabane Honeko)
Portrayed by: Natsuki Deguchi
Sumihiko Somejima (染島澄彦, Somejima Sumihiko)
Portrayed by: Daiken Okudaira
Nei Togeya (棘屋寧, Togeya Nei)
Portrayed by: Hikaru Takahashi
Masachika Jingu (尽宮正親, Jingū Masachika)
Portrayed by: Tao Tsuchiya

== Media ==
=== Manga ===
Written and illustrated by Masamitsu Nigatsu, Honeko Akabane's Bodyguards was serialized in Kodansha's shōnen manga magazine Weekly Shōnen Magazine from September 21, 2022, to November 20, 2024. Kodansha collected its chapters in twelve tankōbon volumes, released from January 17, 2023, to January 17, 2025.

Kodansha has published the manga digitally in English through its K Manga digital service. In March 2024, Kodansha USA announced that they had licensed the manga for print release, with the first volume set to be published in January 2025.

==== Volumes ====
No.	Original release date	Original ISBN	English release date	English ISBN
1	January 17, 2023	978-4-06-530272-9	January 28, 2025	979-8-88877-354-3
1. "Arakuni Ibuki's Great Efforts" (威吹荒邦の奔走, Ibuki Arakuni no Honsō); 2. "Class 3-4's Doubt" (3年4組の疑心, San-nen yon-kumi no Gishin); 3. "Honeko Akabane's Struggles" (赤羽骨子の受難, Akabane Honeko no Junan); 4. "Masachika Jingu's Frustration" (尽宮正親の焦燥, Jingu Masachika no Shōsō); 5. "Arakuni Ibuki's 50 Minutes" (威吹荒邦の50分, Arakuni Ibuki no Gojū-bu)
2	March 16, 2023	978-4-06-530932-2	March 25, 2025	979-8-88877-355-0
6. "Masachika Jingu's Demise" (尽宮正親の終焉, Jingū Masachika no Shūen); 7. "The Traitor in Class 3-4" (3年4組の裏切り者, San-nen yon-kumi no Uragirimono); 8. "Sumihiko Somejima's Recommendation" (染島澄彦の推薦, Somejima Sumihiko no Suisen); 9. "Honeko Akabane's Concern" (赤羽骨子の屈託, Akabane Honeko no Kuttaku); 10. "Orpheus in the Underworld" (地獄のオルフェ, Jigoku no Orufe); 11. "Nei Togeya's Longtime Foe" (棘屋寧の宿敵, Togeya Nei no Shukuteki); 12. "Arakuni Ibuki's Oath" (威吹荒邦の宣誓, Ibuki Arakuni no Sensei); 13. "Kinugashima High School's Nonconformist" (鬼怒ヶ島高校の異端児, Kinugashima Kōkō no Itanji); 14. "Masachika Jingu's Struggles" (尽宮正親の受難, Jingu Masachika no Junan)
3	May 17, 2023	978-4-06-531561-3	May 27, 2025	979-8-88877-356-7
15. "Honeko Akabane's Frustration" (赤羽骨子の焦燥, Akabane Honeko no Shōsō); 16. "Class 3-4's True Strength" (3年4組の実力, San-nen yon-kumi no Jitsuryoku); 17. "Class 3-4's Envy" (3年4組の羨望, San-nen yon-kumi no Senbō); 18. "Arakuni Ibuki's Motto" (威吹荒邦の信条, Ibuki Arakuni no Shinjō); 19. "Kunigashima High School's Counterattack" (鬼怒ヶ島高校の逆襲, Kinugashima Kōkō no Gyakushū); 20. "Class 3-4's School Trip" (3年4組の修学旅行, San-nen yon-kumi no Shūgakuryokō); 21. "The Traitor's Baptism" (裏切り者の洗礼, Uragirimono no Senrei); 22. "Class 3-4's Departure" (3年4組の出発, San-nen yon-kumi no Shuppatsu); 23. "Moonlight" (月の光, Tsuki no Hikari)
4	July 14, 2023	978-4-06-532189-8	July 29, 2025	979-8-88877-357-4
24. "The Traitor's Secret Meeting" (裏切り者の密会, Uragirimono no Mikkai); 25. "Honeko Akabane's Agreement" (赤羽骨子の承諾, Akabane Honeko no Shōdaku); 26. "Masachika Jingu's Journey Forward" (尽宮正親の往路, Jingu Masachika no Ōro); 27. "Arakuni Ibuki's End of Term Exam" (威吹荒邦の期末テスト, Arakuni Ibuki no Kimatsu Tesuto); 28. "Kuran Shuto's Downfall" (首藤孔蘭の失墜, Shutō Kōran no Shittsui); 29. "Class 3-4's Undercover Investigation" (3年4組の潜入捜査, San-nen yon-kumi no Sen'nyū Sōsa); 30. "The Hunting Dog Organization's Representative" (猟犬商会の代表, Ryōken Shōkai no Daihyō); 31. "Jo Kagara's Step Forward" (嘉柄譲の前進, Kagara Jō no Zenshin); 32. "The Salvation Funeral Garden's Parent and Child" (救世葬苑の親子, Kuzesōen no Oyako)
5	September 14, 2023	978-4-06-532896-5	September 30, 2025	979-8-88877-358-1
33. "Yamihime Higure's Deep-Rooted Delusion" (日暮弥美姫の妄執, Higure Yamihime no Mōshū); 34. "Class 3-4's Closing Ceremony" (3年4組の終業式, San-nen yon-kumi no Shūgyō-shiki); 35. "Yamihime Higure's Sword" (日暮弥美姫の剣, Higure Yamihime no Ken); 36. "Class 3-4's Aspirations" (3年4組の憧憬, San-nen yon-kumi no Dōkei); 37. "Arakuni Ibuki's Rage" (威吹荒邦の激情, Arakuni Ibuki no Gekijō); 38. "The Puppies' Waltz" (子犬のワルツ, Koinu no Warutsu); 39. "Farewell Song" (別れの曲, Wakare no Kyoku); 40. "Class 3-4's Supporters" (3年4組の助っ人, San-nen yon-kumi no Suketto); Extra Story: "Masachika Jingu's Redemption" (尽宮正親の清算, Jingu Masachika no Seisan)
6	November 16, 2023	978-4-06-533548-2	November 25, 2025	979-8-88877-359-8
41. "Arakuni Ibuki's Influence" (威吹荒邦の所為, Ibuki Arakuni no Seii); 42. "The Traitor's Revealed" (裏切り者の種明かし, Uragirimono no Taneakashi); 43. "Sumihiko Somejima's Rematch" (染島澄彦の続き, Somejima Sumihiko no Tsuzuki); 44. "The Salvation Funeral Garden's Traitor" (救世葬苑の裏切り者, Kuzesōen no Uragirimono); 45. "Sumihiko Somejima's Shameful Behavior" (染島澄彦の醜態, Somejima Sumihiko no Shūtai); 46. "Arakuni Ibuki Reveals His Tricks" (威吹荒邦の種明かし, Ibuki Arakuni no Taneakashi); 47. "Love's Greeting" (愛の挨拶, Ai no Aisatsu); 48. "Honeko Akabane's Wild Chase" (赤羽骨子の奔走, Akabane Honeko no Honsō); 49. "Honeko Akabane's Attack" (赤羽骨子の強襲, Akabane Honeko no Kyōshū)
7	February 16, 2024	978-4-06-534575-7	—	—
50. "Arakuni Ibuki's Key Figure" (威吹荒邦の立て役者, Ibuki Arakuni no Tateyakusha); 51. "Class 3-4's Swindler" (3年4組の詐欺師, San-nen yon-Kumi no Sagishi); 52. "Suzaku Umishiro's Farewell" (海代朱雀の決別, Umishiro Suzaku no Ketsubetsu); 53. "Masahito Jingu Tells All" (尽宮正人の開口, Jingu Masahito no Kaikō); 54. "Masachika Jingu's Challenge Letter" (尽宮正親の挑戦状, Jingu Masachika no Chōsen jō); 55. "Sosoji High School's New Semester" (錚々児高校の新学期, Sōsōji Kōkō no Shingakki); 56. "The Harassment of the Ex-Jingu Gang Members" (元尽宮組の嫌がらせ, Moto Jingu-gumi no Iyagarase); 57. "Arakuni Ibuki's Negotiation" (威吹荒邦の懐柔, Ibuki Arakuni no Kaijū); 58. "Honeko Akabane's Bodyguards" (赤羽骨子のボディガード, Akabane Honeko no Bodigādo)
8	April 17, 2024	978-4-06-535189-5	—	—
59. "Arakuni Ibuki's Scenario" (威吹荒邦のシナリオ, Ibuki Arakuni no shinario); 60. "Kuran Shuto's Adlib" (首藤孔蘭のアドリブ, Shutō Kōran no Adoribu); 61. "Interlude - Sakura Ibuki" (威吹桜の幕間, Ibuki Sakura no Makuai); 62. "Tomoe Managami's New Beginning" (真名上朋恵の明転, Managami Tomoe no Akaten); 63. "Takeo Ibuki's Showstopper" (威吹丈夫のいぶし銀, Ibuki Takeo no Ibushigin); 64. "The Three Sister's Finale" (三姉妹のフィナーレ, Sanshimai no Fināre); 65. "Honeko Akabane's Curtain Call" (赤羽骨子のカーテンコール, Akabane Honeko no Kāten Kōru); 66. "Love Dream" (愛の夢, Ai no Yume); 67. "Arakuni Ibuki's Strange Turn of Fate" (威吹荒邦の奇縁, Ibuki Arakuni no Kien)
9	July 17, 2024	978-4-06-535803-0	—	—
68. "Soji Kodo's Obsession" (孤堂惣慈の拘り, Kodō Sōji no Kodawari); 69. "The Kojo Family's 18th Son" (孤堂一家の十八男, Kodō ikka no Jūhachi Otoko); 70. "Kuran Shuto's Call to Action" (首藤孔蘭の奮起, Shutō Kōran no Funki); 71. "Kuran Shuto's Fierce Struggle" (首藤孔蘭の奮闘, Shutō Kōran no Funtō); 72. "Kuran Shuto's Warning" (首藤孔蘭の忠告, Shutō Kōran no Chūkoku); 73. "Kuran Shuto's Message" (首藤孔蘭の報告, Shutō Kōran no Hōkoku); 74. "Honeko Akabane's Confession" (赤羽骨子の告白, Akabane Honeko no Kokuhaku); 75. "Ride of the Valkyries" (ワルキューレの騎行, Warukyūre no Kikō); 76. "Masachika Jingu's New Year's Greeting" (尽宮正親の迎春, Jingu Masachika no Geishun)
10	September 17, 2024	978-4-06-536779-7	—	—
77. "Masachika Jingu's Adolescent Period" (尽宮正親の青春, Jingū Masachika no Seishun); 78. "The Student Council Member's Grave Sin" (生徒会役員の大罪, Seitokai Yakuin no Taizai); 79. "Arakuni Ibuki's Sincerity" (威吹荒邦の本気, Ibuki Arakuni no Honki); 80. "Honeko Akabane's Final..." (赤羽骨子の最後, Akabane Honeko no Saigo); 81. "Masahito Jingu Settles His Affairs" (尽宮正人の清算, Jingū Masahito no Seisan); 82. "Class 3-4's Fundraising" (3年4組の資金調達, San-nen yon-kumi no Shikin Chōtatsu); 83. "Etsu Kodo's Chance Meeting" (孤堂悦の邂逅, Kodō Etsu no Kaikō); 84. "Soji Kodo's Unforeseen Snag" (孤堂惣慈の暗礁, Kodō Sōji no Anshō); 85. "Sumihiko Somejima's Grand Filial Piety" (染島澄彦の孝行, Somejima Sumihiko no Kōkō)
11	November 15, 2024	978-4-06-537438-2	—	—
86. "Class 3-4's Training Camp" (3年4組の強化合宿, San-nen yon-kumi no Kyōka Gasshuku); 87. "Honeko Akabane's Rampage" (赤羽骨子の暴走, Akabane Honeko no Bōsō); 88. "Kuran Shuto's Long-Held Desire" (首藤孔蘭の本懐, Shutō Kōran no Honkai); 89. "Class 3-4's Team Competition" (3年4組の紅白戦, San-nen yon-kumi no Kōhaku-sen); 90. "Class 3-4's Future" (3年4組の行く先, San-nen yon-kumi no Yukusaki); 91. "Class 3-4's Raid" (3年4組のカチコミ, San-nen yon-kumi no Kachikomi); 92. "Yuma Kodo's Tenacity" (孤堂由真の執念, Kodō Yuma no Shūne); 93. "Class 3-4's Secret Techniques" (3年4組の必殺技, San-nen yon-kumi no Hissatsu Waza); 94. "Shien Kodo's Tenacity" (孤堂紫炎の執念, Kodō Shien no Shūnen)
12	January 17, 2025	978-4-06-538048-2	—	—
95. "Sumihiko Somejima's Promise" (染島澄彦の約束, Somejima Sumihiko no Yakusoku); 96. "The Kodo Family's Full Score" (孤堂一家のフルスコア, Kodō Ikka no Furusukoa); 97. "Soji Kodo's Envy" (孤堂惣慈の羨望, Kodō Sōji no Senbō); 98. "Soji Kodo's Story" (孤堂惣慈の物語, Kodō Sōji no Monogatari); 99. "Yuma Kodo's Devotion" (孤堂由真の献身, Kodō Yuma no Kenshin); 100. "Yuma Kodo's Will" (孤堂由真の遺言, Kodō Yuma no Yuigon); 101. "Arakuni Ibuki's Conclusion" (威吹荒邦の決着, Ibuki Arakuni no Ketchaku); 102. "Honeko Akabane's Address" (赤羽骨子の答辞, Akabane Honeko no Tōji); 103. "Arakuni Ibuki's Journey is Complete" (威吹荒邦の完走, Ibuki Arakuni no Kansō)

=== Live-action film ===
In February 2024, it was announced that the series would receive a live-action film adaptation. The film stars Raul as Arakuni Ibuki and is directed by Junichi Ishikawa, with scripts written by Hiroyuki Yatsu. It premiered in Japanese theaters on August 2, 2024.

== Reception ==
The series was nominated for the Next Manga Award in the print category in 2023.
