= Silent (TV series) =

- Also known as: サイレント
- Genre: Melodrama; Romance
- Written by: Miku Ubukata
- Directed by: Hiroki Kazama; Mai Takano; Shunsuke Shinada
- Starring: Haruna Kawaguchi; Ren Meguro
- Music by: Masahiro Tokuda
- Opening theme: Subtitle by Official Hige Dandism
- Country of origin: Japan
- Original language: Japanese
- No. of episodes: 11

Production
- Producer: Ken Murase
- Production company: Aoi.Pro

Original release
- Network: FNS (Fuji TV)
- Release: October 6 – December 22, 2022

Silent (stylized as silent) (Japanese: サイレント, Hepburn: Sairento)

Silent is a 2022 romantic Japanese television drama

is a 2022 romantic Japanese television drama starring Haruna Kawaguchi and Ren Meguro. It aired on Fuji Network System stations during the network's prime time slot on Thursday evenings. The series was critically acclaimed for its depiction of deafness, its realistic dialogue, and Meguro and Kawaguchi's performances, breaking the record for the most "catch-up viewers" (number of viewers who watched episodes between airing and the next episode) on streaming in Japanese history.

== Synopsis ==
Tsumugi Aoba (Haruna Kawaguchi) and Sou Sakura (Ren Meguro) dated in their third year of high school after discovering their common interest in music but one day after graduation, Sou suddenly broke up with her without giving any reason and disappeared. Eight years passed and one day, Tsumugi spots Sou in a crowd. Wanting to meet him once more and have a proper talk, Tsumugi begins to look for him, but she learns the unexpected truth that he has early-onset bilateral sensorineural hearing loss, which gradually weakens the hearing, and has almost completely lost his hearing.

== Characters ==
=== Main ===
- Haruna Kawaguchi as Tsumugi Aoba, a part-timer at Tower Records and ex-girlfriend of Sou Sakura.
- Ren Meguro as Sou Sakura, an editor who was diagnosed with early-onset bilateral sensorineural hearing loss and ex-boyfriend of Tsumugi Aoba.

=== Supporting ===
- Ouji Suzuka as Minato Togawa, Tsugumi's boyfriend and former best friends with Sou.
- Hiyori Sakurada as Moe Sakura, Sou's sister.
- Rihito Itagaki as Hikaru Aoba, Tsumugi's brother.
- Kaho as Nana Momono, Sou's friend who was born deaf.
- Shunsuke Kazama as Masaki Haruo, Tsumugi's sign language teacher.
- Ryōko Shinohara as Ritsuko Sakura, Sou's mother.

== Production ==
Silent is written by Miku Ubukata, winner of the 2021 Fuji Television Young Scenario Award, after she was recruited by producer Ken Murase. It is her first serialized drama series. After being tasked with programming for the network's weekday evening drama slot, Murase wanted the series to be based on a love story that was focused on the sentimentality of love rather than flashiness and extravagance.

Meguro and Kawaguchi were cast as the leads in the series prior to the writing of the script. Ubukata used footage and past works of both actors to base the dialogue of the script. The script was written in consultation with individuals who are deaf or hard of hearing and Ubukata also attended sign language classes. The production of the series was also in consultation with individuals who are hard of hearing, deaf or children of deaf adults who also served as onset supervisors.

Filming took place in Tokyo at local landmarks including Setagaya-Daita Station and the Tower Records building in Shibuya.

== Accolades ==
Award	Category	Recipient(s) and nominee(s)	Ref.
114th The Television Drama Academy Awards	Best Actress	Haruna Kawaguchi	
114th The Television Drama Academy Awards	Best Supporting Actor	Ren Meguro	
114th The Television Drama Academy Awards	Best Supporting Actress	Kaho	
114th The Television Drama Academy Awards	Theme Song Award	Official Hige Dandism	
114th The Television Drama Academy Awards	Best Director	Hiroki Kazama, Mai Takano, Shunsuke Shinada	
39th ATP Awards	Best Drama Series	Silent	
2022 TVer Awards	Drama Grand Prize	Silent	
2023 Elan D'Or Awards	Special Award	Silent	
31st Hashida Awards	Hashida Award	Silent	
31st Hashida Awards	Hashida Newcomer Award	Miku Ubukata	
31st Hashida Awards	Hashida Newcomer Award	Ren Meguro	
