= Taro Sakamoto =

Fictional character from Sakamoto Days

- Sakamoto Days character
- Taro Sakamoto in his obese form (left) and his fit form (right)
- First appearance: Sakamoto, December 26, 2019 (Jump Giga Winter 2020)
- Created by: Yuto Suzuki
- Portrayed by: Ren Meguro
- Voiced by: Japanese: Tomokazu Sugita; English: Matthew Mercer

In-universe information
- Occupation: Shopkeeper
- Spouse: Aoi (wife)
- Children: Hana (daughter)

Taro Sakamoto (Japanese: 坂本 太郎, Hepburn: Sakamoto Tarō) is the protagonist from the manga Sakamoto Days written and illustrated by Yuto Suzuki. Sakamoto is a legendary ex-hitman who gave up a life of wealth and crime to marry Aoi, now working as a humble convenience store owner. He has gained a lot of weight, and has become more laid-back, but still has his superhuman skill and strength from his hitman days, though he is now 30% of his prime. During extreme situations, he can lose all his fat and becomes skinny, becoming twice as powerful as before.

The character is voiced by Tomokazu Sugita in Japanese, and Matthew Mercer in English. In the live-action film adaptation, he is portrayed by Ren Meguro. Critical response to Sakamoto's character has often been positive, with several critics comparing seeing him as a parody of action heroes like John Wick based on skills he develops in combat. The character's relationship with his coworkers and family were also appreciated by the media.

== Creation ==
The idea of pairing up Taro Sakamoto with a character that can read minds allowed for insight into the character's motivations and for comedy to flourish since Suzuki intended for Sakamoto to be a more quiet and reserved character. For the concept of Sakamoto being a retired hitman, Suzuki said he was fascinated with the idea of a fat person being incredibly strong, pondering as well the reasons that brought him to that state; thinking as well about the reasons that led him to that state; "Why is he fat? Because he retired. Why is that? Maybe because he got married? That's how I made it." He was particularly intrigued by the idea of a strong, obese fighter, a notion that was partly influenced by the comedic action film Enter the Fat Dragon. The character Shin emerged from Suzuki's interest in exploring the potential of an esper who interacts with Sakamoto through telepathy.

For the animated adaptation, Masaki Watanabe noted that Sakamoto's design reflects the original manga's expressiveness while distinguishing his two forms; the fat version has a symbolically deformed face, while the skinny version is more realistic. Watanabe highlighted Sakamoto's distinctive personality and calm daily life, which create a striking contrast during action sequences involving his obese physique.

=== Casting ===
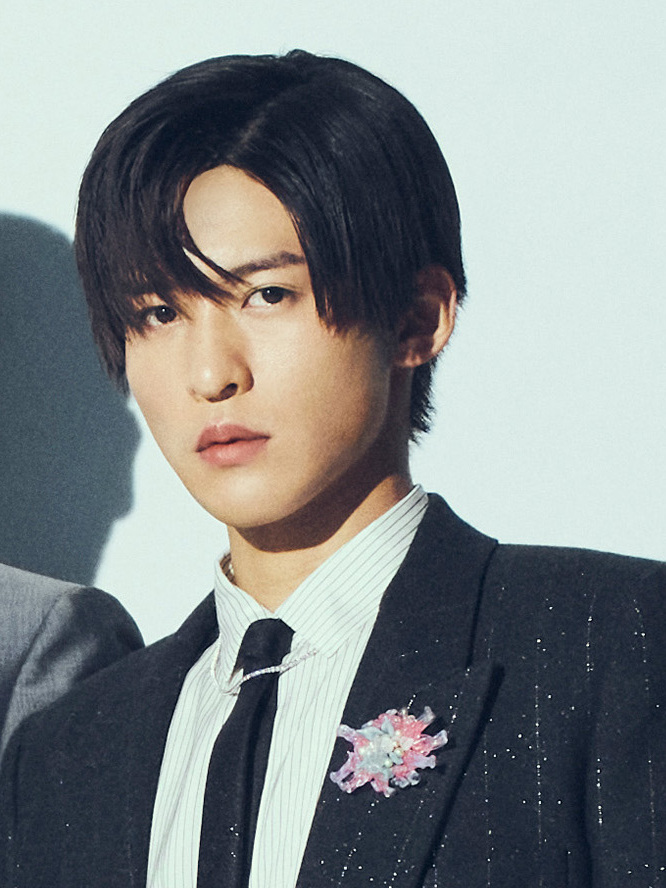
Ren Meguro portrays Sakamoto in the live-action film

Tomokazu Sugita voices the protagonist Taro Sakamoto, having previously been familiar with the original manga series. Initially cast as Kashima, he was later asked to voice Sakamoto instead, appreciating the character's relationships with family and friends. Matthew Mercer found Sakamoto as one of the most unique characters he has ever voiced in anime due to being both a cruel and caring character as a result of his two lives and this Mercer wants to aim to a proper balance when doing his the English dub.

For the live-action film adaptation, the character is portrayed by Ren Meguro. Meguro read the original manga several years ago, and said that he took on many previous roles to convey something to the audience, but this time he is appearing in Sakamoto Days for his own sake.

== Appearances ==
Taro Sakamoto used to be an unrivaled hitman, earning legendary status in the criminal underworld by being feared by some and idolized by others. One day, however, Sakamoto fell in love at first sight with Aoi, a convenience store clerk. In order for them to date, Aoi gave him the ultimatum that he must quit being a hitman and never kill again. Sakamoto agreed, and after his retirement they started dating, got married, had a daughter named Hana, and eventually opened a family-run convenience store of their own in the suburbs of Tokyo.

Several years later, Sakamoto has settled into his humble life, but also grown portly as a result of his relative inactivity despite still being immensely powerful. The world of hitmen eventually locates him, and many soon attempt to target the Sakamoto family, either seeking revenge or resenting his retired status. Now, with the help of three other former criminals who become employed at the store under Sakamoto—clairvoyant hitman Shin Asakura, orphaned crime boss daughter Lu Xiaotang, and sniper Heisuke Mashimo—Sakamoto must protect his family (or die trying) against the criminal underworld, all while maintaining Aoi's no-kill policy.

== Reception ==
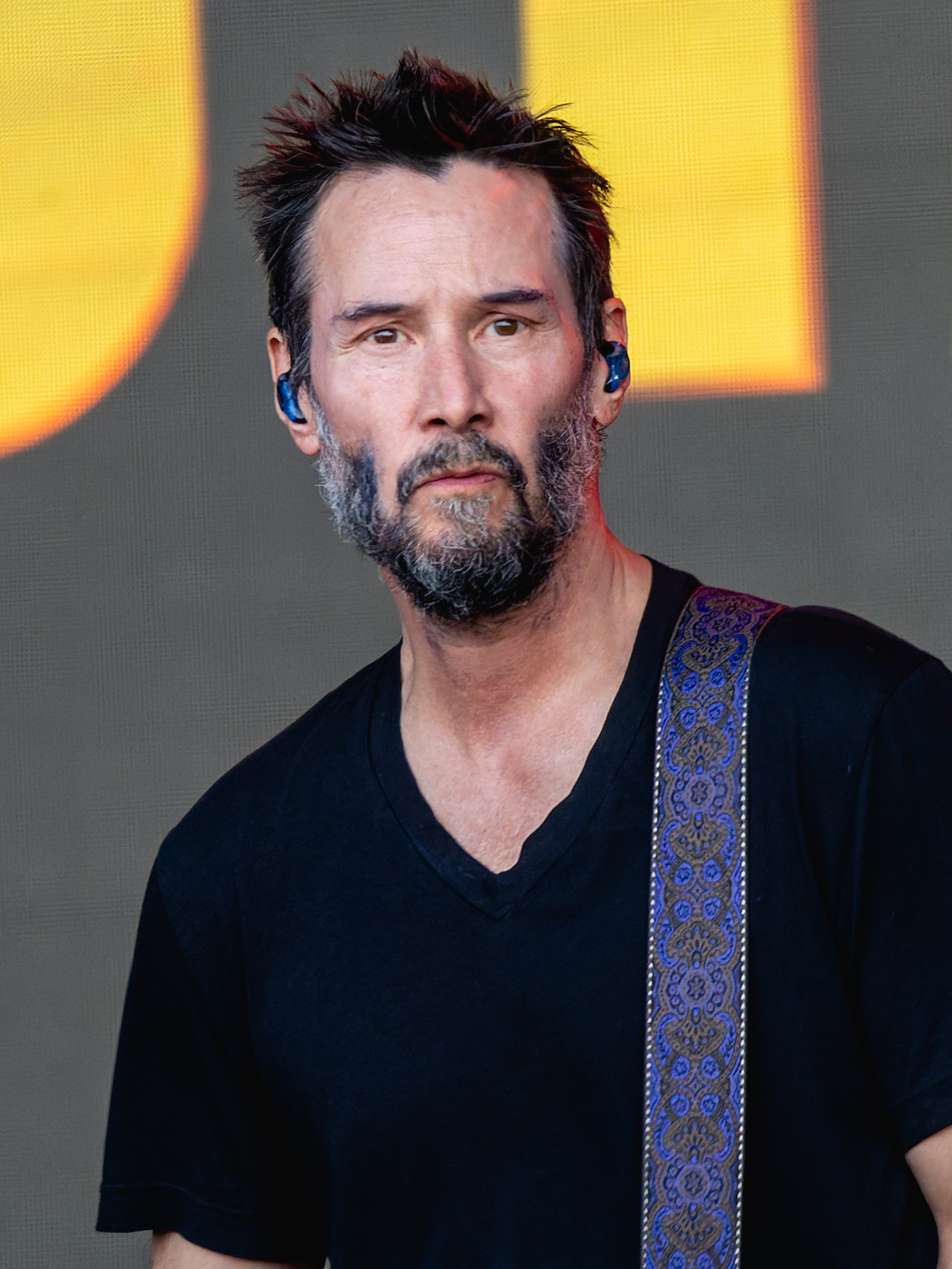
While often seen as a parody of Keanu Reeves' character John Wick, Sakamoto has been analyzed as an ideal hero seeks redemption rather than revenge.

Several writers for manga and anime have commented on Sakamoto's character. ComicBook.com praised Sakamoto and Shin for sharing distinct traits and backstories already in early in episodes of the series but lamented they overshadow Lu Xiaotang's character too much especially in a series primarily aimed towards a male demography, resulting in the lack of appeal for female viewers. In comparison, both manga and anime, the same website said the latter made it clear why Sakamoto leaves his hitman days behind when marrying Aoi by giving Sakamoto a proper peaceful life as a family man. In regards to the fight scenes, the writer said Suzuki uses impressive fight choreographies for Sakamoto's duels as his early fights with katanas and guns are well adapted to the point they are comparable to films like Kill Bill and John Wick. Screen Rant also brought multiple comparison between Sakamoto and the latter movie John Wick especially with how Sakamoto and the latter's protagonist. However, Screen Rant in particular liked how Sakamoto's pacificsm and skills during fight scenes result him into wielding unpracticable items like a pencil to fight back a villain. This not only gives the protagonist an outstanding aura when facing criminals but also jokes about tropes common in action films. At the 10th Crunchyroll Anime Awards, Tariq Obaid won the award of "Best Voice Artist Performance (Arabic)" for his performance as Taro.

In a further analysis of the manga's fight scenes, Game Rant regarded Sakamoto as the series' second strongest character thanks to how the title character is still capable of using his original hitman skills despite whenever he burns his body's calories and is suprassed only by fellow character Takamura. Screen Rant was surprised by Tomokazu Sugita's initial confession that he did not want to voice Sakamoto during recording of the series until realizing how helpful the character is to the rest of the cast. This led to comparisons to Sakamoto and Sugita's previous famous role, Gintoki Sakata from Gintama, as both protagonists help several supporting characters who later being to "heal" him while living together. Screen Rant noted they were different as Sakamoto "is someone who strives to be kind to others far more directly and far more often than" Gintoki. Anime News Network in particular praised Sakamoto's fight scene in the anime's 9th episode for mixing comedy with violence properly, as Kashima forces the protagonist to bring his full potential and is constantly overpowered in comical fashions. While Collider notes that Sakamoto is a strong ex-killer, his family represents his humanity, carrying a message of redemption more positive that the ones found in Batman stories among Hollywood action movies the character is associated with. The writer also noticed that the change of physical state Sakamoto tends to add to an internal struggle about what part of his life is more important when fight as "doesn't associate ripped abs and bulging muscles with the 'peak male form'" society tends to think. Sakamoto's themes of redemption are passed through his assistant Shin who starts following the same rules as him.

Several writers also focused on the character's relationships and multiple works. Sequential Tart commented on the protagonist's endearing relationship with his family and the dynamic he shares with Shin. Anime Feminist was initially worried about how exactly Sakamoto's relationship with his wife was played in regards to how much Aoi knows of her husband's actions and how much development it would have while watching the series' premiere. Both Polygon and FandomWire in particular liked the romantic scenes between Sakamoto and Aoi before they get married as the latter does a ridiculous move, risking her own life, to prove the former that deaths should be avoided if they want to continue their relationship, proving in particular how much Sakamoto's characterization was explored in a single despite the present one not being that talkative in comparison. In a later episode, Aoi's shock to hearing from Sakamoto that he is fighting again because there is a bounty of his head to be well executed as the wife reminds her husband the family should not keep secrets from each other. This handling of the relationship was praised by Polygon for making the story more "grounded" as it feels more realistic despite having experience with other popular series like Spy × Family whose trio of protagonist always hide each other's secrets.
