= Ren Meguro =

Japanese singer and actor (born 1997)

- 目黒蓮
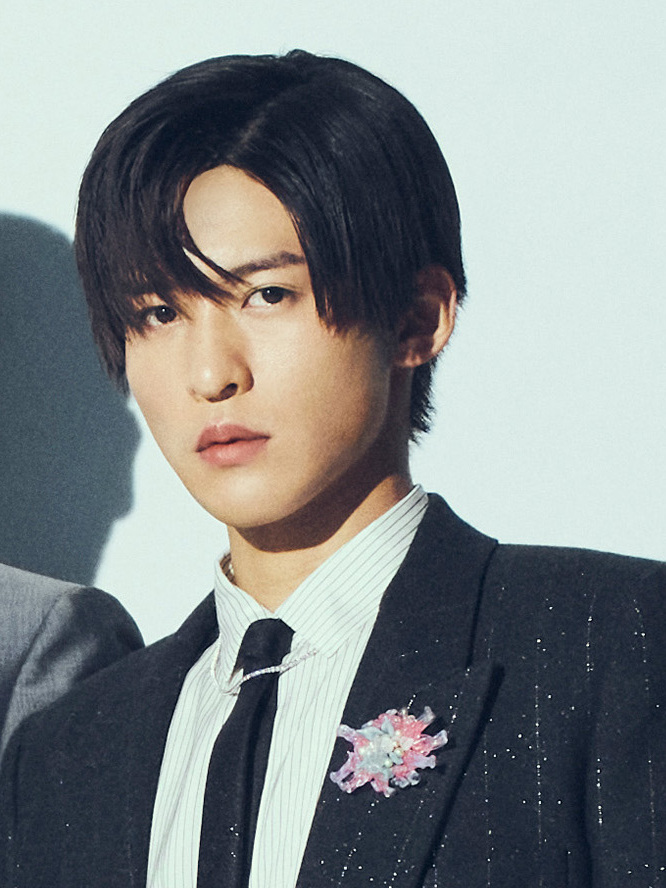
- Meguro in January 2024
- Born: February 16, 1997 (age 29); Tokyo, Japan
- Other names: MeMe, Meguro, Ren
- Occupations: Singer; actor; model
- Years active: 2010–present
- Agents: Johnny's & Associates (2010–2023); Starto Entertainment (2023–present)
- Height: 185 cm (6 ft 1 in) / 64 kg
- Website: Snow Man Family Club

Ren Meguro (目黒蓮, Meguro Ren; born February 16, 1997, in Tokyo) is a Japanese singer and actor who is a member of the idol group Snow Man under Starto Entertainment, formerly known as Johnny & Associates.

== Career ==
Ren Meguro joined Starto in October 2010. In November 2016, he was chosen to be a member of Uchuu Six, a newly formed pre-debut unit under Junior, a branch of Starto that manages trainees and their activities.

On January 17, 2019, Meguro was added as a new member to Snow Man, an existing Junior unit, in addition to Koji Mukai and Raul. Snow Man made their official debut on January 22, 2020. Subsequently, corresponding to his debut in Snow Man, Meguro withdrew from Uchuu Six.

On Aug 11, 2021, Meguro co-starred with labelmate Shunsuke Michieda in the television live action adaptation of My Love Mix-Up! in his first leading role outside of Snow Man related projects.

On February 21, 2022, Meguro was announced to star as one of the four lead roles in Phases of the Moon, the film adaptation of the 157th Naoki Prize winning novel, Tsuki no Michikake (月の満ち欠け) by Shogo Sato, on the film's official Twitter. In April of the same year, he was announced to co-star in the live action film adaptation of As Long as We Both Shall Live with Mio Imada to be released the following year.

On July 14, 2023, he played his first lead role in a TV drama in Trillion Game. On November 25, Meguro won the Best Emerging Actor Award at the 5th Tama Film Awards Ceremony for his work in My Happy Marriage (2023) and Phases of the Moon (2022). He was cast in second season of Shogun.

=== Modeling ===
Meguro also works as a model, and has been a regular model for Fineboys Magazine since November 2018.

On May 7, 2020, it was announced that he would appear for Fineboys June issue for first time as solo cover, which was released on May 29.

On June 8, it was announced that the Fineboys's 2020 June and July issue with Meguro on the cover would be republished. The news caused the site's to crash for 5 seconds after it was announced.

In 2024, Meguro was selected to be a brand ambassador for the luxury Italian fashion brand Fendi. He is the company's first Japanese men's brand ambassador. Additionally, Meguro modeled for the brand's Spring/Summer 2025 menswear campaign, making him the first Japanese person to be featured as the primary model of a global Fendi advertising campaign.

== Filmography ==
=== TV dramas ===
Year	Title	Role	Notes	Ref.
2015	Oniichan, Gacha	Boy E/ Natsko's Onii-chan		
2019	We Apply an Easy Job	Wakadai Akita "Wanchan"	Lead role	
2021	Kyojo 2	Rikito Soma	Mini series	
2021	My Love Mix-Up!	Kousuke Ida	Lead role	
2022	Silent	Sou Sakura		
2022–2023	Soar High!	Hiroaki Kashiwagi	Asadora	
2023	Trillion Game	Haru Tennōji	Lead role	
2024	Where Does the Sea Begin	Natsu Tsukioka	Lead role	
2025	Passing the Reins	Koichi Nakajo		
TBA	Shōgun	Kazutada	Season 2; American television series	

=== Films ===
Year	Title	Role	Notes	Ref.
2020	Takizawa Kabuki ZERO 2020: The Movie	Himself	Lead role	
2022	Mr. Osomatsu	Choromatsu Matsuno	Lead role	
2022	Phases of the Moon	Akihiko Misumi		
2023	As Long as We Both Shall Live	Kiyoka Kudo	Lead role	
2025	Trillion Game: The Movie	Haru Tennōji	Lead role	
2026	Until We Meet Again	Reiji Urushibara	Lead role	
2026	Sakamoto Days	Taro Sakamoto	Lead role	
2026	Kyojo: Reunion	Rikito Soma		

=== Stage ===
Time	Title	Place	Note	Ref
September 8–9, 2012	Johnny's Dome Theatre 〜Summary〜	Tokyo Dome City Hall		
April 7 – May 12, 2013	Takizawa Kabuki 2013	Shinbashi Enbujō		
April 10 – May 15, 2016	Takizawa Kabuki 2016	Shinbashi Enbujō		
April 7 – May 14, 2017	Takizawa Kabuki 2017	Shinbashi Enbujō	Replaced Ryuichi Tanimura, who was injured during the performance.	
April 9 – May 13, 2018	Takizawa Kabuki 2018	Shinbashi Enbujō	He didn't appeared from April 5 to 8 due to conflicting dates schedule with "Squad".	
June 4–30, 2018	Takizawa Kabuki 2018	Misono-za		
February 3–25, 2019	Takizawa Kabuki Zero	Minami-za	Appears as a Snow Man in the Shinbashi Enbujo show.	

== Awards and nominations ==
Name of the award ceremony, year presented, category, nominee(s) of the award, and the result of the nomination
Award ceremony	Year	Category	Nominee(s)/work(s)	Result	Ref.
Blue Ribbon Awards	2024	Best Newcomer	As Long As We Both Shall Live	Nominated	
Elan d'or Awards	2024	Newcomer of the Year	Phases of the Moon & Silent & As Long As We Both Shall & Trillion Game	Won	
Hashida Awards	2023	Best New Comer	Silent & Maiagare	Won	
Japan Academy Film Prize	2023	Best Supporting Actor	Phases of the Moon	Nominated	
Japan Academy Film Prize	2023	Newcomer of the Year	Phases of the Moon	Won	
Kinema Junpo Awards	2023	Best New Actor	Mr. Osomatsu & Phases of the Moon	Won	
Mainichi Film Awards	2022	Best New Actor	Phases of the Moon	Nominated	
Tama Film Awards	2023	Best New Actor	Phases of the Moon & As Long As We Both Shall Live	Won	
Tokyo Drama Awards	2023	Best Supporting Actor	Silent	Won	
TV Station Drama Awards	2023	Best Supporting Actor	Silent	Won	
TV Life Annual Drama Awards	2022	Best Lead Actor	My Love Mix-Up! (Kieta Hatsukoi)	Won	
TV Life Annual Drama Awards	2023	Best Supporting Actor	Silent	Won	
Yokohama Film Festival	2024	Best New Comer	Phases of the Moon & As Long As We Both Shall Live	Won	
