= Snow Man =

Japanese musical group

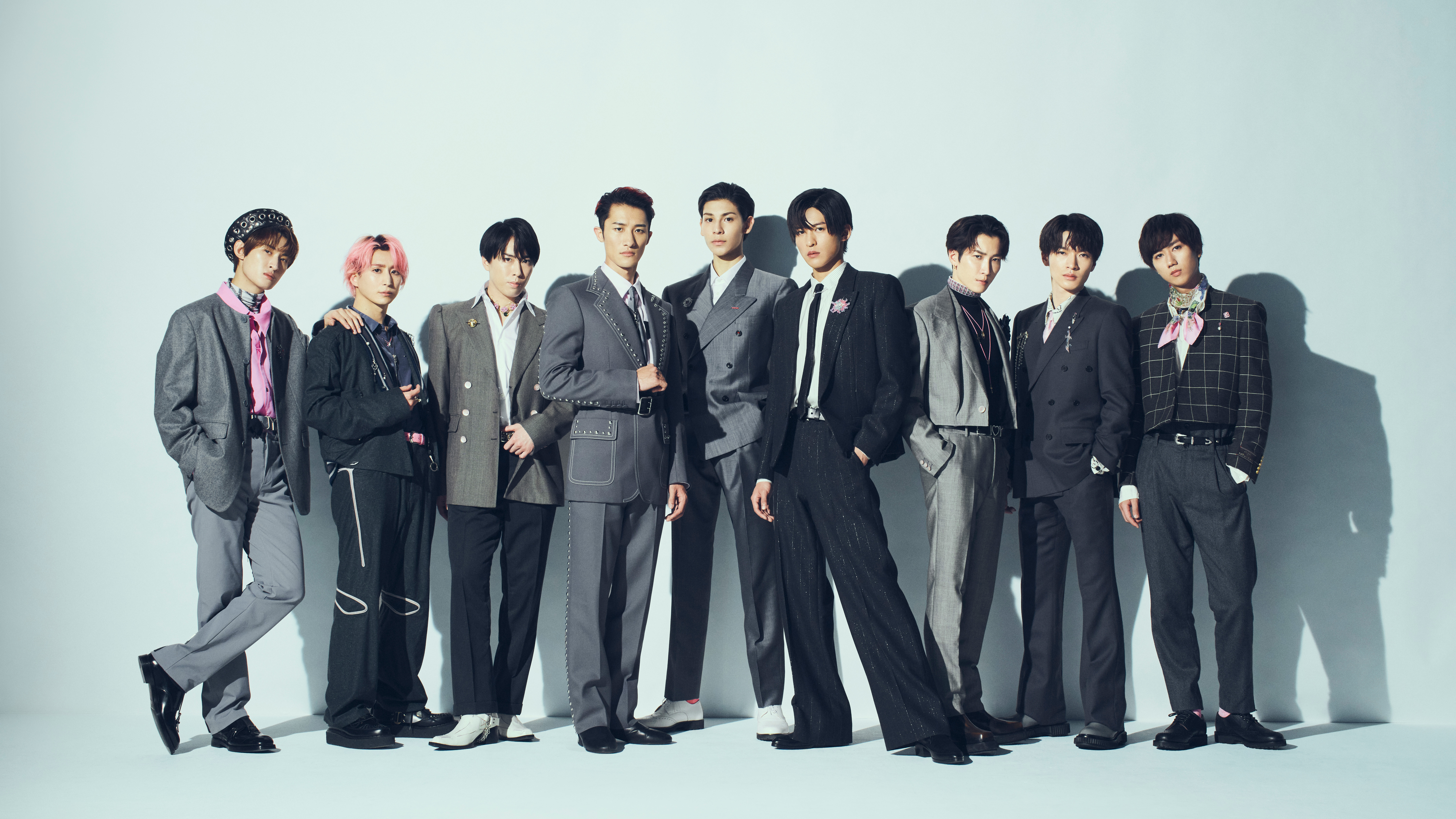
- Snow Man in 2023

Background information
- Origin: Japan
- Genre: J-pop
- Years active: 2020–present
- Labels: Avex Trax (2020–2022); MENT Recording (2022–present)
- Members: Hikaru Iwamoto; Tatsuya Fukazawa; Maito Raul Murakami; Shota Watanabe; Koji Mukai; Ryohei Abe; Ren Meguro; Ryota Miyadate; Daisuke Sakuma
- Website: mentrecording.jp/snowman/ www.johnnys-net.jp

Snow Man is a Japanese idol boy band under Starto Entertainment. The group's activities focused on acrobats and stage play.

Snow Man made their official debut on January 22, 2020, at the same time as SixTones. The groups' simultaneous debut marked the first time for two groups to debut on the same day in the company's history. "D.D."/"Imitation Rain" became the best-selling debut release in Asian history with more than 1.8 million physical copies sold, making Snow Man the best selling debut group since KAT-TUN in 2006.

It is also the first male idol single in 17 years to remain in the top 100 of the Oricon chart for more than 100 weeks. Since their debut in 2020, the group has sold over 160 million physical copies in Japan. In 2021, their debut studio album, Snow Mania S1, sold in its first week more than 1.8 million physical copies, and became in the best selling first week for a boy group studio album in Japanese history, and the second best week for a debut album in the country's history. Their single "Grandeur" was the best-selling release of 2021 in Japan with more than 2 million physical copies sold. With this, Snow Man became the first male artist since L'Arc-en-Ciel in 1999 to have multiple releases sell more than a million copies in two consecutive years.

In January 2022, Snow Man moved from label Avex Trax to MENT Recording. MENT Recording is a joint label between Avex Entertainment and Starto Entertainment. Kis-My-Ft2, another group from the same company and under Avex Trax, also moved to MENT Recording.

== History ==
The group was preceded by Mis Snow Man, a unit formed in 2009 that consists of 9 people. The group has been active in stage play series Takizawa Kabuki since 2010. Among them, a unit consists of Tatsuya Fukazawa, Daisuke Sakuma, Shota Watanabe, Ryota Miyadate, Hikaru Iwamoto, and Ryohei Abe was later formed on May 3, 2012. The group's new name, Snow Man, was first announced when the six men stood in the stage of Takizawa Kabuki 2012, when letters suddenly appeared on the big screen behind them. The group's name was officially announced both to them and audience as a surprise.

While active as back dancers for Tackey & Tsubasa, Kis-My-Ft2, A.B.C-Z, and other senior groups, they also regularly appeared in stage plays such as Dream Boys and Takizawa Kabuki, and from 2015, Shonen-tachi and its movie version. Since all of them are good at acrobatics, they are sometimes referred as "a group of highly talented and dedicated performers" and are often nominated by seniors in the company as "Junior members they want to have as back dancers." While they have been described as "the best dancer among Junior" since their formation in 2012, and despite their appearances in theater, the group couldn't get the chance to get a debut, making the members think about leaving. In January 2019, Raul from Shonen Ninja, Ren Meguro from Uchuu Six, and a member from Kansai Junior, Koji Mukai, were added as new members. While the original 6 members accepted the decision as "wanting to protect the group," they also felt that "even if whole group (as original Snow Man) was gone, we just want to realize our dream as Snow Man," and "the only way to get rid of this problem (off my head) is this."

In March 2019, Island TV, a website made to provide exclusive video streaming content from Johnny's Jr. members was released.< Individual concerts were streamed for a fee. Snow Man, along with 11 other Johnny's Jr. groups (SixTones, Travis Japan, HiHi Jets, Bi Shonen, 7 Men Samurai, Shonen Ninja, Jr.SP, Uchuu Six, Naniwa Danshi, Lil Kansai, and Ae! Group) held their first "solo" concert In August 8, and was streamed via the site.

The group's debut was first announced by Takizawa, who is told by Johnny Kitagawa in his hospital bed in June 2019. Debuting at the same time as SixTONES, the announcement was officially made in Johnny's Jr. 8.8 Matsuri 〜Tokyo Dome kara Hajimaru〜 concert on August 8, 2019. They also "graduated" from Johhny's Jr. official YouTube channel and officially opened their own YouTube channel on December 25, 2019.

=== 2020–present: Debut ===
On February 1, 2020, the group marked their first overseas appearance in Japan Expo Thailand 2020. Their Asia tour titled Snow Man ASIA TOUR 2D.2D in Kanagawa Prefecture, Osaka, and Tokyo, as well as overseas live in Bangkok, Singapore, Jakarta, and Taipei had to be cancelled due to the COVID-19 pandemic.

In March 2020, the group received their own television show titled Sore Snow Man ni Yarasete Kudasai (それSnowManにやらせて下さい; lit. Leave It to Snow Man). The show's was revealed as a surprise to Snow Man through their YouTube channel in February 2020. The show's first episode aired on March 25, 2020, on TBS.

Hikaru Iwamoto was reported in March 2020, to be taking a break from group's activities, after the Japanese magazine Friday published a report of him drinking at love motel in 2017. Through Johnny's apology post, it was written that Iwamoto confirmed that an underage girl was among those present. The other 8 members also made their apology in their appearance at the live music program CDTV Live! Live! on the same day as the reported news. On July 1, Johnny's net and Johnny's web announced that Iwamoto would return to resume his activities.

In April 2020, the group performed the 11th opening theme song for the anime Black Clover, titled "Stories".

In May 2020, Snow Man was announced to be a part of Twenty★Twenty, a temporary unit consisting of 75 talents that have debuted in Johnny's, to perform a charity song. (Note: Except for Iwamoto who was taking a break from activities at the time) The unit was formed to help curb the spread of the novel coronavirus. The song, titled "Smile," is written by Kazutoshi Sakurai and is produced by Hideaki Takizawa.

A movie version of stage play Takizawa Kabuki called Takizawa Kabuki Zero The Movie (滝沢歌舞伎 ZERO The Movie) was released on December 5, 2020, starring the members of Snow Man in the main roles. This marks Snow Man's post-debut first main role in a movie.

In December 2020, it was announced that Ryota Miyadate had tested positive for COVID-19. Their New Years performance was canceled as a result.

On January 5, 2021, Snow Man's song "Grandeur" debuted as the 13th Opening for Black Clover.

In April 2021, it was reported that Daisuke Sakuma would voice the male lead of Chinese animated movie White Snake, Ah Xuan, in its Japanese dub version. This is Sakuma's second voice acting role after he debuted in Black Clover. The Japanese version of the movie also features a theme song by Snow Man, "Yuan" (縁 -YUÁN-).

In August 2021, Snow Man was announced to star in the live action movie adaptation of anime series Mr. Osomatsu. Six of them played the Matsuno sextuplets while the rest, Ryōta Miyadate, Shōta Watanabe, and Ryōhei Abe, as original characters named Period, End, and Close respectively. The film premiered on March 25, 2022. The group also provided the film's theme song "Brother Beat."

In the same month, the group announced their first album release titled Snow Mania S1. The album released on September 29, 2021. The first edition A of the album contains the highly requested group's pre-debut original songs, including "Make It Hot!" and "Owaranai Memories."

On October 1, 2024, member Shōta Watanabe was chosen as the Swarovski jewelry brand's first ambassador in Japan. In the same month, the group performed the ending theme song for the second season of the anime Blue Lock, titled "One".

On January 22, 2025, Snow Man released their first greatest hits album, The Best 2020–2025, marking the fifth anniversary of their debut. The album sold over 1.1 million copies on its first day on sale, topping the Oricon Daily Album Ranking chart for January 21, 2025. Its first-week sales hit 1,395,000 copies, setting a new record for the highest first-week sales of Japan’s Reiwa Era.

It was reported that Snow Man would have two concerts in Japan National Stadium in 2025, making it the third group from the former Johnny & Associates's debuted groups (after SMAP and Arashi) and the first of Starto Entertainment to perform there. The tour "Snow Man 1st Stadium Live Snow World" will take place on April 19 and 20 at the National Stadium and at Nissan Stadium in Kanagawa on June 7 and 8.

Snow Man's "Odorouze!" will serve as theme song for Daisuke Sakuma's starring movie Specials, to be released on March 6, 2026.

== Members ==
Name		Born	Member color	Note
Romanization	Kanji	Born	Member color	Note
Tatsuya Fukazawa	深澤 辰哉	May 5, 1992 (age 34) Tokyo, Japan	Purple	
Daisuke Sakuma	佐久間 大介	July 5, 1992 (age 34) Tokyo, Japan	Pink	
Shōta Watanabe	渡辺 翔太	November 5, 1992 (age 34) Tokyo, Japan	Blue	
Ryōta Miyadate	宮舘 涼太	March 25, 1993 (age 33) Tokyo, Japan	Red	
Hikaru Iwamoto	岩本 照	May 17, 1993 (age 33) Saitama, Japan	Yellow	leader
Ryōhei Abe	阿部 亮平	November 27, 1993 (age 32) Chiba, Japan	Green	
Koji Mukai	向井 康二	June 21, 1994 (age 32) Nara, Japan	Orange	
Ren Meguro	目黒 蓮	February 16, 1997 (age 29) Tokyo, Japan	Black	
Raul Murakami Maito	村上 真都	June 27, 2003 (age 23) Tokyo, Japan	White	center

== Discography ==
=== Studio albums ===
Snow Man discography
- Studio albums: 6
- Compilation albums: 1
- Singles: 11
- Video albums: 5

Title	Information	Chart positions		Sales	Certifications
Title	Information	JPN	JPN Comb	Sales	Certifications
Snow Mania S1	Released: September 29, 2021 (JPN); Label: Avex; Formats: CD, CD/DVD, CD/BD	1	1	JPN: 1,060,900	RIAJ: Million
Snow Labo. S2	Released: September 21, 2022 (JPN); Label: Ment Recording; Formats: CD, CD/DVD, CD/BD	1	1	JPN: 1,070,700	RIAJ: Million
I Do Me	Released: May 17, 2023 (JPN); Label: Ment Recording; Formats: CD, CD/DVD, CD/BD	1	1	JPN: 1,270,800	RIAJ: Million
Rays	Released: October 30, 2024 (JPN); Label: Ment Recording; Formats: CD, CD/DVD, CD/BD	1	1	WW: 1,300,000; JPN: 1,080,577	RIAJ: Million
Onkochishin (音故知新)	Released: November 5, 2025 (JPN); Label: Ment Recording; Formats: CD, CD/DVD, CD/BD	1	1	WW: 1,210,000; JPN: 1,031,312	RIAJ: Million
Amenity	Released: August 24, 2026 (JPN); Label: Ment Recording; Formats: CD, CD/DVD, CD/BD, digital download, streaming	1	1	JPN: 1,013,677	RIAJ: Million

=== Compilation albums ===
Title	Information	Chart positions	Sales	Certifications
Title	Information	JPN	Sales	Certifications
The Best 2020–2025	Released: January 22, 2025; Label: Ment Recording; Formats: CD, CD/DVD, CD/BD, digital download	1	WW: 1,670,000; JPN: 1,395,344	RIAJ: Million

=== Video albums ===
List of video albums, with selected chart positions, certifications and sales
Title	Video details	Peak chart positions		Sales	Certifications
Title	Video details	JPN DVD	JPN BD	Sales	Certifications
Snow Man Asia Tour 2D.2D.	Released: March 3, 2021; Label: Avex; Formats: DVD, Blu-ray	1	1	JPN: 580,867	RIAJ: 2× Platinum
Takizawa Kabuki Zero the Movie	Released: April 7, 2021; Label: Avex Trax; Formats: DVD, Blu-ray	1	1	JPN: 620,900	RIAJ: Gold
Snow Man Live Tour 2021 Mania	Released: April 4, 2022; Label: Ment Recording; Formats: DVD, Blu-ray	1	1	JPN: 780,100	RIAJ: 2× Platinum
Snow Man Live Tour 2022 Labo.	Released: July 5, 2023; Label: Ment Recording; Formats: DVD, Blu-ray	1	1	JPN: 796,000	RIAJ: 3× Platinum
Snow Man 1st Dome Tour 2023 I Do Me	Released: December 31, 2023; Label: Ment Recording; Formats: DVD, Blu-ray	1	1		RIAJ: 3× Platinum
Snow Man Dome Tour 2024 Rays	Released: June 26, 2025; Label: Ment Recording; Formats: DVD, Blu-ray	1	1		RIAJ: 2× Platinum

=== Singles ===
Title	Information	Chart positions		Sales	Certifications
Title	Information	JPN	JPN Comb	Sales	Certifications
"D.D./Imitation Rain"	Released: January 22, 2020; Also includes SixTONES' "Imitation Rain"; Label: Avex / SME Japan	1	1	JPN: 1,859,372	RIAJ: Million
"Kissin' My Lips/Stories"	Released: October 7, 2020; "Kissin' My Lips" was used as song for Dior's commercial movie starring Raul; "Stories" was used as an opening song for anime Black Clover; Label: Avex	1	1	JPN: 1,178,326	RIAJ: Million
"Grandeur"	Released: January 20, 2021; "Grandeur" was used as an opening song for anime Black Clover; "Namida no Umi o Koeteyuke" was used as theme song for group's program "Sore, Snow Man ni Yarasete Kudasai"; Label: Avex	1	1	JPN: 1,040,226	RIAJ: 3× Platinum
"Hello Hello"	Released: July 14, 2021; "Hello Hello" is used as main theme for movie Honey Lemon Soda; "Yuan" is used as the main theme for the Japanese dub version of the film White Snake; Label: Avex	1	1	JPN: 962,787	RIAJ: 3× Platinum
"Secret Touch"	Released: December 1, 2021; Used as main theme for TV drama series My Love Mix-Up!; Label: Avex	1	1	JPN: 852,959	RIAJ: 3× Platinum
"Brother Beat" (ブラザービート, Burazā Bīto)	Released: March 30, 2022; Used as main theme for live action movie Osomatsu-san; Label: Ment Recording	1	1	JPN: 895,899	RIAJ: 3× Platinum
"Orange Kiss" (オレンジkiss, Orenji kiss)	Released: July 13, 2022; Used as main theme for live action movie My Boyfriend in Orange; Label: Ment Recording	1	1	JPN: 943,749	RIAJ: 3× Platinum
"Tapestry" / "W" (タペストリー / W, Tapesutori / W)	Released: March 15, 2023; "Tapestry" is used as main theme for movie My Happy Marriage; "W" is Used as main theme for TV drama series Dai byōin senkyo; Label: Ment Recording	1	1	JPN: 1,000,000	RIAJ: Million
"Dangerholic"	Released: September 6, 2023; Used as main theme for live action show Trillion Game; Label: Ment Recording	1	1	JPN: 869,205	RIAJ: Million
"Love Trigger" / "We'll Go Together"	Released: February 14, 2024; "Love Trigger" is the theme song for the TV Asahi drama Koisuru Keigo 24 Ji; "We'll Go Together" is the theme song for the NTV drama Sensei Sayonara; Label: Ment Recording	1	1	JPN: 1,192,951	RIAJ: Million
"Breakout" / "Kimi wa Boku no Mono" (Breakout / 君は僕のもの)	Released: July 31, 2024; Label: Ment Recording	1	1	JPN: 1,067,101	RIAJ: Million
"Serious"	Released: July 23, 2025; Label: Ment Recording	1	1	JPN: 882,605	RIAJ: Million
"Bang!!" / "Save Your Heart" / "Odorōze!"	Released: April 29, 2026; Label: Ment Recording	1	1	JPN: 882,605	RIAJ: Million

=== Unreleased songs ===
2015

- Zig Zag Love

2016

- Acrobatic

2017

- Boogie Woogie Baby
- VI Guys Snow Man
- Vanishing Over

2018

- Snow Dream
- Party! Party! Party!
- Don't Hold Back

2019

- Make It Hot
- Hirari to Sakura (ひらりと桜)
- Lock On!
- Owaranai Memories (終わらない MEMORIES)
- Cry Out
- Shokai Rap ~We Are Snow Man~ (紹介RAP～WE ARE SNOW MAN～)
- Su no Kimi ni Aitai (素の君に会いたい)
- Asayake no Hana (朝焼けの花)

2020（post debut）

- Black Gold
- Be Proud! (2nd theme song for television program Sore Snow Man ni Yarasete Kudasai!)

== Awards ==
Award ceremony	Year	Category	Nominee / Work	Result	Ref.
Billboard Japan Music Awards	2021	Top Singles Sales of the Year	"Grandeur"	Won	
Billboard Japan Music Awards	2022	Hot Album of the Year	Snow Labo. S2	Won	
Billboard Japan Music Awards	2022	Top Albums Sales of the Year	Snow Labo. S2	Won	
Billboard Japan Music Awards	2022	Top Singles Sales of the Year	"Orange Kiss"	Won	
Billboard Japan Music Awards	2024	Hot Album of the Year	Rays	Won	
Billboard Japan Music Awards	2024	Top Albums Sales of the Year	Rays	Won	
Billboard Japan Music Awards	2024	Top Singles Sales of the Year	"Love Trigger" / "We'll Go Together"	Won	
Japan Gold Disc Awards	2021	Top Five New Artists – Japanese	Snow Man	Won	
Japan Gold Disc Awards	2021	Single of the Year	"D.D./Imitation Rain" (with SixTones)	Won	
Japan Gold Disc Awards	2021	Top Five Singles	"Kissin' My Lips/Stories"	Won	
Japan Gold Disc Awards	2022	Artist of the Year – Japanese	Snow Man	Won	
Japan Gold Disc Awards	2022	Album of the Year – Japanese	Snow Mania S1	Won	
Japan Gold Disc Awards	2022	Single of the Year	"Grandeur"	Won	
Japan Gold Disc Awards	2022	Top Five Singles	"Hello Hello"	Won	
Japan Gold Disc Awards	2022	Top Three Music Videos – Japanese	Snow Man Asia Tour 2D.2D.	Won	
Japan Gold Disc Awards	2023	Artist of the Year – Japanese	Snow Man	Won	
Japan Gold Disc Awards	2023	Album of the Year – Japanese	Snow Labo. S2	Won	
Japan Gold Disc Awards	2023	Top Five Singles	"Orange Kiss"	Won	
Japan Gold Disc Awards	2023	Top Five Singles	"Brother Beat"	Won	
Japan Gold Disc Awards	2023	Music Video of the Year – Japanese	Snow Man Live Tour 2021 Mania	Won	
Japan Gold Disc Awards	2024	Artist of the Year – Japanese	Snow Man	Won	
Japan Gold Disc Awards	2024	Top Five Albums – Japanese	I Do Me	Won	
Japan Gold Disc Awards	2024	Top Five Singles	"Tapestry" / "W"	Won	
Japan Gold Disc Awards	2024	Top Five Singles	"Dangerholic"	Won	
Japan Gold Disc Awards	2024	Music Video of the Year – Japanese	Snow Man 1st Dome Tour 2023 I Do Me	Won	
Japan Gold Disc Awards	2024	Top Three Music Videos – Asia	Snow Man Live Tour 2022 Labo.	Won	
Japan Gold Disc Awards	2025	Album of the Year – Japanese	Rays	Won	
Japan Gold Disc Awards	2025	Single of the Year	"Love Trigger" / "We'll Go Together"	Won	
Japan Gold Disc Awards	2025	Top Five Singles	"Breakout" / "Kimi wa Boku no Mono"	Won	
Weibo Account Festival	2019	New Artist Award	Snow Man	Won	
Weibo Account Festival	2020	Popular Group Award	Snow Man	Won	
