= La Grande Maison Tokyo Special =

2024 Japanese television drama

- Promotional poster
- Kanji: グランメゾン東京スペシャル
- Genre: Japanese television drama
- Based on: La Grande Maison Tokyo
- Screenplay by: Tsutomu Kuroiwa
- Directed by: Ayuko Tsukahara
- Starring: Takuya Kimura; Masataka Kubota; Kyōka Suzuki; Yuta Tamamori; Kanichiro; Ayako Yoshitani; Ikki Sawamura; Mitsuhiro Oikawa; Kazuki Kitamura; Anne Nakamura; Onoe Kikunosuke V Aki Asakura
- Music by: Hideakira Kimura
- Original language: Japanese

Production
- Producers: Hidenori Iyoda; Keiko Matsumoto
- Running time: 125min
- Production companies: TBS Sparkle; TBS TV

Original release
- Network: TBS TV
- Release: December 29, 2024

Related
- La Grande Maison Tokyo; La Grande Maison Paris

La Grande Maison Tokyo Special (Japanese: グランメゾン東京スペシャル, Hepburn: guranmezon toukyou supesharu) is a Japanese television special drama that is the sequel to television series La Grande Maison Tokyo and is scheduled to air on December 29, 2024, on the TBS Television network in Japan. This work is set in a post-COVID-19 pandemic world. The sequel to this work is the film La Grande Maison Paris.

The catchphrase for this film is "Bring back the stars with our comrades."

In the promotional poster, a leading actor Takuya Kimura and guest starring actor Masataka Kubota are wearing samue, the formal attire of Mayur Kyoto.

== Premise ==
Shortly after Rinko Hayami won three Michelin stars for La Grande Maison Tokyo, the COVID-19 pandemic hit the restaurant industry worldwide. Her restaurant also suffered a financial setback, and in order for the restaurant to survive, she formed a business alliance with a food service consulting firm NEX Management, Inc. to conduct online sales of frozen dinners and website management for recipes. Rinko began to think only about running the restaurant and forgot her passion for cooking, and La Grande Maison Tokyo finally lost all of its Michelin stars. Also, Natsuki Obana, who was supposed to have left for Paris, had lost contact with her. One day, Rinko and Kanna Kusumi hear a rumor that Meilleur Kyoto, newly opened restaurant in Kyoto, is a strong contender for the world best French restaurant. After tasting their dishes, Rinko is convinced that Obana is there. Why is Obana in Japan, whom they have lost touch with, and will La Grande Maison Tokyo be able to revive itself?

== Development ==
Kimura, the lead actor, said, "It was very exciting news for me to be able to build the world view of La Grande Maison Tokyo once again. I am very proud, happy, and grateful that all the cast members from those days are still present without changing a single one of them. I am participating as Obana, a member of that cast, so I feel that I have no choice but to do my part to the best of my ability," he said, expressing his joy at the sequel. Masataka Kubota plays Yuasa, the chef at Mayur Kyoto, the restaurant in Kyoto where Obana and Rinko are reunited. Yuasa had worked with Obana at Escoffille in Paris. There is a scene in the play where Yuasa presses Hirako, his junior from his Escoffille days, into a cooking duel. Kubota said, "The character I play, Yuasa, loves French cuisine and takes cooking very seriously. This time, Yuasa plays the role of Obana's trusted partner, and Kimura taught me the manners, gestures, and hand movements of a chef, which also gave me a hint for playing Yuasa. I hope you will look forward to this film, as it contains many important elements that serve as a bridge between La Grande Maison Tokyo and its sequel, La Grande Maison Paris." Sosuke Akashi, played by Kitamura, is the president of NEX Management, a company affiliated with a major corporation that has a capital alliance with La Grande Maison Tokyo. He sees a business opportunity in Rinko Hayami, the first Asian female chef of a three-star restaurant. Akashi is an efficiencyist and considers cooking only as a business. As a result, the members of La Grande Maison Tokyo are contractually unable to freely confront the cuisine. Kitamura commented on this role, "Akashi has Akashi's idea of justice and his work is reasonable, which is why he has employees and a contract with La Grande Maison Tokyo. Some young people may think that Akashi's efficiency-oriented way of thinking is the right way of thinking, so I thought about the justice of each of them when I was shooting the film. I have devised a play with a few quirks in playing Akashi, but I think it adds a nice spice to the film, so I hope you enjoy it." The culinary supervisor for this work is a Chef Shuzo Kishida of the French restaurant Quintessence in Tokyo, continuing from the previous work. the chef Shuzo Kishida said, "I received a great response to my previous culinary supervision, and I hope that this television special drama will bring vitality to the restaurant industry, including French cuisine." On October 4, 2024, Yukio Hattori of Hattori Nutrition College, who supervised the cooking for this series died. All casts and staffs expressed their sincere condolences for Hattori on the program's official Twitter.

== Promotion ==
=== Michelin Guide Ceremony Tokyo 2025 ===
Takuya Kimura and Yuta Tamamori from this film took the stage as unexpected guests at the Michelin Guide Ceremony Tokyo 2025 on October 17, 2024, in Tokyo, Japan. Kimura announced the three-star restaurants and presented plaques, while Tamamori presented chef jackets. Kimura said, "Today I left my role in the play and participated as Kimura," while Tamamori said, "In the previous film, I participated in the ceremony as Hirako in the play, but I feel very nervous to actually stand in this place." After the presentation ceremony, Kimura said, "Every time I held the plaque before handing it over, I almost became emotional thinking that Obana, the character I played, had struggled for this plaque but could not reach it. I could feel your tolerant and powerful presence, and although I did not eat anything, I think I could sense your personality and seriousness," he said. Tamamori said the highlight of the La Grande Maison Tokyo special is the cooking duel between new characters Yuasa and Hirako in the play, which he hopes everyone will look forward to. At this ceremony, Quintessence, French restaurant in Tokyo, which supervised the cooking for the previous TV series and this film, was awarded three Michelin stars in the Michelin Guide. This was the 18th consecutive year since the Michelin Guide Tokyo edition was first published in 2007.

=== Tokyo Comic Con 2024 ===
On December 8, 2024, Yuta Tamamori and Ayako Yoshitani, the stars of this drama series, made a guest appearance at the Tokyo Comic Convention 2024 held at Makuhari Messe as part of the "Grand Maison Project" to promote the special drama La Grande Maison Tokyo Special and the film La Grande Maison Paris. Tamamori and Yoshitani appear in the drama as a senior and junior sous-chef and pastry chef. Tamamori said that when he received the offer for the sequel, he wondered if he would have to perform those cooking scenes again. Tamamori said he was very nervous because in this series, the actors themselves perform all the authentic cooking scenes, so that pressure was strong and no mistakes were allowed. He said that they recreated realistic cooking scenes during the filming. "We didn't skip scenes such as putting meat on the fire with butter, but kept filming until the heat was actually turned on, so I couldn't stand the silent time," he said, and also revealed that he cut his finger during the realistic cooking scenes and injured himself. Yoshitani talked about her visit to Takamura Hamono, the factory that produced the kitchen knives used in the film, and said that she realized that good work (cooking) is possible because of people making kitchen knives this way.

== Reception ==
According to Video Research, the program's household television viewership in the Kanto region was 8.7%. As of 7 January 2025, the film holds an approval rating of 78% on Filmarks, based on 509 reviews, with an average rating of 3.9/5. Reviews were generally positive, with many saying that they enjoyed the realistic depiction of the impact of COVID-19 on restaurants, that they enjoyed the performance of Kazuki Kitamura as a typical villain, that the food preparation and eating scenes were very good, was as good as the previous television series, which received high praise. U-Next announced that this special drama was the most-watched Japanese television series category in January 2025. Previous series La Grande Maison Tokyo was first in December of the previous month and third this time around.

== Cast ==
=== Starring ===
- Takuya Kimura as Natsuki Obana: Sous-chef at Meilleur Kyoto.
- Kyoka Suzuki as Rinko Hayami: Chef de cuisine at La Grande Maison Tokyo
- Yuta Tamamori as Shohei Hirako: Sous-chef at La Grande Maison Tokyo
- Kanichiro as Koichi Serita: Chef de partie at La Grande Maison Tokyo
- Ayako Yoshitani as Moe Matsui: Pastry chef at La Grande Maison Tokyo
- Ikki Sawamura as Rikutaro Kyono: Manager of waiting tables of La Grande Maison Tokyo.
- Mitsuhiro Oikawa as Aizawa Kamehito: Chef. Preparing something in Paris.
- Anne Nakamura as Kanna Kusumi: She is in charge of Rinko's management and is currently on assignment at NEX Management, Inc.
- Onoe Kikunosuke V as Manabu Tango: Chef de cuisine at Restaurant gaku
- Ai Tominaga as Linda Machiko Richard: Foodservice influencer
- Aki Asakura as Miyu Ebina: Wife of Shohei Hirako

=== Guest starring ===
- Masataka Kubota as Toshihisa Yuasa: Chef de cuisine at Meilleur Kyoto. Obana and Yuasa were seniors and juniors when they were in Paris, and they are also rivals. Shohei Hirako was his junior when he worked at Escoffille in Paris.
- Kazuki Kitamura as Sousuke Akashi: President of NEX Management, Inc.

== Staff ==
- Screenplay: Tsutomu Kuroiwa
- Direction: Ayuko Tsukahara
- Music: Hideakira Kimura
- Culinary Supervisor: Shuzo Kishida (Chef of Quintessence), Hattori Nutrition College
- Production company: TBS Sparkle, TBS Television (Japan)
