= La Grande Maison Paris =

2024 Japanese film

- Teaser poster
- Kanji: グランメゾンパリ
- Revised Hepburn: Guranmezonpari
- Directed by: Ayuko Tsukahara
- Screenplay by: Tsutomu Kuroiwa
- Based on: La Grande Maison Tokyo by Tsutomu Koroiwa; La Grande Maison Tokyo Special by Tsutomu Koroiwa
- Produced by: Hidenori Iyoda; Keiko Matsumoto; Masanobu Yamada; Jeremy Thomas
- Starring: Takuya Kimura; Kyōka Suzuki; Ok Taec-yeon; Yoshinori Masakado; Yuta Tamamori; Kanichiro; Ayako Yoshitani; Anne Nakamura; Ai Tominaga; Mitsuhiro Oikawa; Ikki Sawamura
- Music by: Hideakira Kimura
- Production company: TBS Sparkle
- Distributed by: Toho; Sony Pictures Entertainment Japan
- Release date: December 30, 2024 (Japan)
- Running time: 111 minutes
- Country: Japan
- Language: Japanese

Grande Maison Paris (Japanese: グランメゾンパリ, Hepburn: guranmezonpari) is a 2024 Japanese film produced by TBS Sparkle and distributed by Toho and Sony Pictures Entertainment Japan. The film is a sequel to the television series La Grande Maison Tokyo and its special episode La Grande Maison Tokyo Special.

The catchphrase for this film is "Challenge the world."

Continuing from La Grande Maison Tokyo, the director is Ayuko Tsukahara, who is also known for her work on the TV series Unnatural. The cuisine is supervised by Kei Kobayashi, chef of Restaurant KEI, which actually won three Michelin stars in Paris. The film continues to star Takuya Kimura, with Kyōka Suzuki, Yuta Tamamori, Kanichiro, Ayako Yoshitani, and Anne Nakamura continuing from the previous TV series, and new cast members include South Korean actor Ok Taec-yeon as patissier and Yoshinori Masakado as apprentice. Continuing from the previous TV series, the screenplay is by Tsutomu Kuroiwa and the music by Hideakira Kimura.

For star Takuya Kimura, it has been almost nine years since Hero was released in 2015, the first time a TV series in which he starred was made into a movie. Kimura dyed his own hair blonde for the shoot to show his respect for Chef Kobayashi.

== Premise ==
Years after La Grande Maison Tokyo was awarded three Michelin stars, Natsuki Obana and Rinko Hayami opened a new restaurant named Grande Maison Paris in Paris, the home of French cuisine. Obana's longtime dream was to win three Michelin stars in Paris. However, it is difficult to obtain satisfactory ingredients in a foreign country. After a failure at a prestigious gala dinner, Obana makes a promise to his former mentor that if he does not win the three Michelin stars, he will quit the restaurant and leave France. It is the story of Natsuki Obana, once a charismatic chef, together with his colleagues, overcoming setbacks and border barriers in their quest to win three Michelin stars, the world's highest honor for a chef.

== Cast ==
=== Grand Maison Paris ===
Natsuki Obana
Played by Takuya Kimura
Protagonist. He is chef de cuisine of Grand Maison Paris. He is an unconventional chef who has absolute confidence in his abilities and is willing to make sacrifices for the sake of his cuisine. He is opening a new restaurant in Paris, Grande Maison Paris, and aims to become the first Asian to win three Michelin stars in Paris.
Rinko Hayami
Played by Kyōka Suzuki
She supports Obana as sous-chef. She has an absolute sense of taste and knows the ingredients and their preparation process just by eating the food. However, she has recently lost her sense of taste and smell due to Covid.
Kamehito Aizawa
Played by Mitsuhiro Oikawa
Division Chef at La Grande Maison Paris.
Rikutaro Kyono
Played by Ikki Sawamura
Hall Manager at La Grande Maison Paris. Responsible for the management of the entire floor. He has also worked as a chef in the past.
Rick Yuan
Played by Ok Taec-yeon
Pastry chef in charge of desserts. Korean-Canadian who is skilled enough to own his own restaurant in Paris. He speaks three languages, Korean, French and Japanese. He was headhunted by Obana, but his passion for cooking is so strong that he sometimes argues with Obana.
Tasuku Kogure
Played by Yoshinori Masakado
He works as an apprentice, mostly buying groceries. He speaks in the Japanese Kansai dialect and is a mood maker in the workplace with his cheerful personality.

=== Grand Maison Tokyo ===
Shohei Hirako
Played by Yuta Tamamori
Chef de cuisine at Grande Maison Tokyo.
Kouichi Serita
Acted by Kanichiro
Division Chef at Grande Maison Tokyo.
Moe Matsui
Played by Ayako Yoshitani
Pastry chef at Grande Maison Tokyo.
Kanna Kuzumi
Played by Anne Nakamura
Hall Staff and Sommeliers at Grande Maison Tokyo.
Toshihisa Yuasa
Played by Masataka Kubota
Sous-chef at Grande Maison Tokyo. In the drama special, Obana was assisting him as a sous-chef at Mayur Kyoto, Yuasa's own restaurant. He now works at Grand Maison Tokyo, where Hirako is the head chef.

=== Blancan ===
Louis Blancan
Played by Patrick Descamps
He is the chef of Blancan, a restaurant that has been awarded three Michelin stars in Paris for 29 consecutive years. He respects Japanese food culture and lends his rented restaurant to Obana who said he wanted to try his hand in Paris. However, when Obana fails at a gala dinner, he demands that Obana return the restaurant.

Pascal Blancan
Played by Yannick Renier
He is the chef of Blancan and the only son of Louis Blancan. As the second generation of restaurant Blancan, he feels pressure to continue winning three Michelin stars.

=== Others ===
Linda Machiko Richard
Played by Ai Tominaga
Food Influencer. Her reputation is a major factor in the restaurant's reputation.

== Production ==
=== Development ===
The TV series La Grande Maison Tokyo, which aired in 2019, was well received and received high ratings. Since in the last episode, Obana hinted that he would continue his challenge abroad next, many viewers expressed a desire for a sequel after the broadcast. However, due to the proliferation of COVID-19 from 2020, a sequel could not be filmed. Kyōka Suzuki, a main cast member, had taken a break from acting for health reasons since May 2023, but in March 2024, it was reported that a special episode of La Grande Maison Tokyo would be broadcast at the end of that year, and that Suzuki would make a comeback with this special episode. In June, it was announced that a sequel set in Paris as La Grande Maison Paris would be made into a movie. The film is a sequel to the special episode as a prequel, with the first-class colleagues at La Grande Maison Tokyo led by Obana and their new additions aiming to win three Michelin stars in Paris. Filming for this special episode and the film took place from January to March 2024 after the COVID-19 infection converged, with extensive filming on location in Paris, France, which was hosting 2024 Summer Olympics in March. Kimura and the rest of the main cast took on the challenge of performing the same amount of lines in French as they did in Japanese. Both are scheduled for release on December 30, 2024.

Producer Hidenori Iyoda said that in making La Grande Maison Paris, he was delighted with the TV series that was partly shoot in Paris, but was excited to be able to go there again, this time to shoot a movie. In making the film, he interviewed many chefs and observed them cooking. He said that he was again impressed by the fact that they put their lives on the line to cook. He said that the highlights of this film are the atmosphere created by shooting in Paris, the reality of the images created by working with Parisian staff, and the realistic cooking scenes made possible by the supervision of Kei Kobayashi, a chef who has actually won three Michelin stars in Paris.

=== Casting ===
Takuya Kimura, the lead actor, said that all the cast and staff of La Grande Maison Tokyo were special attached to this film, so he was happy to see them again after five years. His character, Obana, had always dreamed of winning three Michelin stars in Paris, but had never achieved it, so Kimura thought it's a big deal that he is trying again to achieve his dream. Actress Kyoka Suzuki said that La Grande Maison Tokyo is one of the most important works she has ever appeared in and received good feedback from many people, so she was very happy to be able to come to Paris, her favorite city, for the film adaptation of this work.

In this film, two new young actors joined the cast as La Grande Maison Paris staff. South Korean actor and singer Ok Taec-yeon, a member of boy band 2PM, made his first appearance in a Japanese film. In addition to his music career, he has been pursuing his acting career since his appearance in Cinderella's Stepsister broadcast on KBS2 in 2010, and is also known for his acting skills as he played a villain in Vincenzo broadcast in Korea in 2021. He said in an interview, "I'm sad that the filming is over. I was able to make many memories in Japan and Paris. In Paris, I had time to relax and even went out for dinner with my co-stars. I was able to go sightseeing in Montmartre and the Eiffel Tower, and I thought it was such a fun experience. As I worked on the film together with actors and staff from many different countries, I felt that the pursuit of dreams is the same regardless of country. I believe that we were able to express in the story of this film that we are all working together toward the same goal. I hope that when you see the characters pursuing their dreams, you too will receive the courage to say, 'If you aim for it, you can do it!.'"

Yoshinori Masakado is a member of Japanese boy band Ae! group. Ae! group made its CD debut in May 2024, but Masakado had been an actor since his trainee days in the Kansai region of Japan. He first appeared in BS Nippon Corporation's TV series Love Sickness and the Bastard Gang in 2019, and then went on to an acting career that included playing the protagonist's sister's lover in NHK asadora TV series Scarlet and a solo stage lead role in Vincent in Brixton in 2022. He said in an interview, "I am very happy because I never thought I would be able to work with Mr. Kimura, who is my great senior, at my age. I had a very luxurious time working with veteran actors. I would like to grow and cherish what I have learned here. I am very attached to the character I played, so I hope I will leave a lasting impression among the unique characters. The story of the movie is like a shonen manga, and I was moved by the joy of winning more victories. I myself am looking forward to seeing the finished film."

Director Tsukahara explained the reason for Masakado's permed hair. The casting of Masakado came from a recommendation from producer Iyoda. When she first met him, he was such a refreshingly nice young man that she felt he was a bit too good for the mischievous Kogure he played. So, inspired by the fact that Kei Kobayashi's Restaurant Kei actually has a chef with permed hair, she decided to have Masakado have permed hair that would suit his character for his role. As for Ok Taec-yeon, she said that he was a very gentlemanly man and treated her, a woman, in a very gentlemanly manner, but also had a mischievous side, such as when he played a prank with her smartphone that she had left behind and somehow took a picture of Ok and Takuya Kimura together.

=== Music ===
Continuing from TV series, the music is by Hideakira Kimura. The film's theme music is an orchestral arrangement of familiar music from the previous TV series. To promote the film, Tatsuro Yamashita, who composed the theme song for the previous TV series, wrote a new song, "Santé." "Santé" means "toast" in French. According to Yamashita, the song is a cheering song for the main character, Natsuki Obana, and Takuya Kimura, and he said that he put infinite feelings into the minimal number of notes.

== Promotion ==
=== La Grande Maison Tokyo ===
Prior to the movie's release in December, the TV series La Grande Maison Tokyo began streaming on TVer, TBS Free, and U-Next, video streaming services in Japan, on September 1, 2024. In addition, Netflix began streaming the series in more than 190 countries and regions. In addition, the TV series starring Kimura, Good Luck!!, A Life: A Love, The Family, Antarctica, Beautiful Life, and Yuta Tamamori starring La Grande Maison Tokyo spin-off drama Gura Gura Maison Tokyo will also scheduled to be streamed.

=== At San Sebastián International Film Festival ===
On September 24, 2024, the film La Grande Maison Paris was invited to Culinary Cinema section of the 72nd San Sebastián International Film Festival, and was screened first in the world. Kyoka Suzuki, who also stars in the film, attended the event. Suzuki, producer Hidenori Iyoda, and Jeremy Thomas gave a presentation of the film in front of the audience gathered at the long-established cinema Cines Principe. At the beginning of the presentation, Suzuki said, "Kaixo! Ni Kyoka Suzuki naiz.! (Hello! I am Kyoka Suzuki)" in the local Basque language, followed by a message from Takuya Kimura, who was unable to attend the event. The message was, "I would like to express my respect for the people in the food and beverage industry who stepped up and overcame the global COVID-19 pandemic. And through the characters who live in the film, I hope you can experience the pride of not giving up on your dreams and the happiness of having friends who love you."

=== Collaboration products ===
A product in collaboration with this film was released by Mizkan. The product is a soup for nabemono, Japanese hot pot dish. The soup is inspired by the French dish marinière, a white wine steamed clam, with truffle flavor and cheese, a flavor reminiscent of this film set in France. This product is regarded as a novelty, as Japanese nabemono soups are often flavored with bonito or kelp and soy sauce or miso.

=== Red carpet event ===
On December 21, 2024, a red carpet event was held in Shinjuku, Tokyo, in advance of the film's release. The event was attended by Takuya Kimura, Kyoka Suzuki, Ok Taec-yeon, Yoshinori Masakado, Yuta Tamamori, Kanichiro, Ayako Yoshitani, Anne Nakamura, Kazuki Kitamura, Mitsuhiro Oikawa, Ikki Sawamura, and director Ayuko Tsukahara. When the red double-decker bus called "Gramebus" carrying the cast arrived at the red carpet venue, the audience cheered in unison. Afterwards, they enjoyed meeting with fans who had gathered at the venue, and then answered questions in an interview. Kimura said, "I was very surprised and happy to be invited to this event in such a special place like Shinjuku. Thank you so much." He expressed his gratitude. Taec-yeon, a new cast member from the movie, said, "I am happy to be able to participate in such a big project and a big event as a foreigner. Everyone please be careful on your way home and eat a proper dinner at night. Please go to the movie theater and watch this film at the end of the year." Masakado, another new cast member, was surprised by the cheers of the audience and said, "I am so excited to be able to participate in a film that is loved with such passion by so many people. I think the days of filming were like a treasured time for me. I had exciting days every day. I was able to participate in the work of my respected seniors and was warmly welcomed. There was a good sense of tension every day, and it was a good experience for me." he recalled. At the event, it was announced that the film would be released in Paris, and Kimura and the rest of the cast said they were anxious to see the reaction in France, asking "someone to report to the French people in the theater whether they understood our French or not."

=== Big hit thank-you stage greeting ===
On January 15, 2025, a "big hit thank-you stage greeting" was held at the Toho Cinemas Hibiya in Tokyo, with Takuya Kimura, Kyoka Suzuki, Ok Taec-yeon, Ikki Sawamura, Mitsuhiro Oikawa, Yoshinori Masakado, and director Ayuko Tsukahara on stage. Kimura, who stars in the film, was pleased with the good response from the junior members of his agency, Starto Entertainment, and said that the director of his other current shoot had praised Ayuko Tsukahara. This was the second time Ok Taec-yeon greeted the audience at a Japanese movie theater. He asked the audience, which was packed despite it being a weekday, "Is it okay if you don't go to work today?", eliciting laughter from the audience, and he continued by telling the audience to enjoy today's event and screening. The other cast members were surprised at his fluent Japanese without an interpreter.

== Reception ==
As of 7 January 2025, the film holds an approval rating of 78% on Filmarks, based on 5912 reviews, with an average rating of 3.9/5. The reviews were generally favorable, with many saying they enjoyed a delicious meal and a typical story of the team's hard work paying off.

Toho announced that the seven-day period from December 30 to January 5 recorded box-office revenues of 1.39 billion yen ($9.39 million) and audience attendance of 960,000.

On January 25, 2025, it was learned that the film had surpassed 2.16 million in attendance and 3.12 billion yen ($20 million) in box office revenue in the 28 days of its release from December 30, 2024, to January 26, 2025 in Japan.

On February 6, 2025, it was announced that the film had attracted approximately 2.44 million viewers in the 38 days it had been in theaters through February 5, 2025, and had grossed over 3.5 billion yen ($23.62 million) at the box office. In addition, TBS announced that it has reached an agreement with Turkish production company Dass Yapim (Hece Medya is in charge of mediation) and South Korean SLL-owned production company Film Monster to develop a remake of La Grande Maison Tokyo.

On March 3, the movie surpassed 4.02 billion yen ($27 million) in box office revenue and attracted 2.79 million viewers during its 63-day run, ending on March 2, 2025. It was announced that the movie would be released in Thailand starting in April.

== Staff ==
- Director by Ayuko Tsukahara
- Screenplay by Tsutomu Kuroiwa
- Music by Hideakira Kimura
- Culinary Supervisor: Kei Kobayashi (Restaurant KEI)
- Producer by Hidenori Iyoda, Keiko Matsumoto and Masanobu Yamada
- Production company by TBS Sparkle
- Distributor by Toho, Sony Pictures Entertainment Japan
