= La Grande Maison Tokyo =

Japanese television drama

- Japanese: グランメゾン東京
- Genre: Japanese television drama
- Written by: Tsutomu Kuroiwa
- Directed by: Ayuko Tsukahara; Daisuke Yamamuro; Takahiro Aoyama
- Starring: Takuya Kimura
- Opening theme: "Recipe" by Tatsuro Yamashita
- Country of origin: Japan
- Original language: Japanese
- No. of episodes: 11

Production
- Producers: Hidenori Iyoda, Keigo Higashinaka
- Running time: 54min Sunday 9:00pm - 9:54pm
- Production company: TBS Television (Japan)

Original release
- Release: October 20 – December 29, 2019

Related
- Gura Gura Maison Tokyo (Paravi); La Grande Maison Tokyo Special; La Grande Maison Paris

La Grande Maison Tokyo is a Japanese television series that aired from October 2019 to December 2019 at the "Sunday Theater" slot on TBS Television.

The series stars Takuya Kimura as disgraced chef Natsuki Obana, who returns to Japan to start a new three-star restaurant following an allergen contamination accident involving an important guest three years ago. This was Kimura's first television drama since the start of the Reiwa era in 2019. and his first on TBS since 2017's A Life My Sweetheart, which reunites him with co-star Mitsuhiro Oikawa. This is also Kimura's first drama in 12 years with Kyōka Suzuki, both previously having been cast members in The Family.

Filming began on-location at the three-star restaurant L'Ambroisie in Paris, France on August 30, 2019, marking the first time the restaurant has appeared in a scripted series.

The catchphrase on the program's official website is "Catch your own star".

On December 29, 2024, a television special episode La Grande Maison Tokyo Special, a sequel to this TV series, is scheduled to be broadcast. A special episode depict the aftermath of the restaurant following the COVID-19 pandemic. On December 30 of the same year, La Grande Maison Paris, a film set in Paris, is scheduled to be released on the Toho network as a sequel to the television special episode.

== Premise ==
Japanese chef Natsuki Obana trained at the restaurant L'Ambroisie in Paris, France, which was awarded the highest Michelin Guide star (three stars), and opened his own restaurant Escoffille in Paris and won two stars from Michelin Guide. However, at a 2015 French-Japanese summit luncheon in Paris, the French leader collapsed from allergic shock after the food served was laced with nuts, to which he was allergic. The French bureaucrat said, "More than half of the restaurant's employees are immigrants. All employees must submit work visas because of the possibility of terrorism." The discriminatory order enraged Obana, and he beat the bureaucrat and was arrested, he lost the restaurant and all of his colleagues who worked there. (Note: When Kyono asked why he beat the bureaucrat, Obana lied and said it was because he was mocked for his cooking.)

In 2018, Rinko Hayami went to L'Ambroisie for a job interview to become a chef there and be trained to be a Michelin-starred chef. She passed the interview due to her passion for cooking but failed in a cooking test. During the interview and cooking test, Rinko met Obana, a chef she had once admired. Obana decided to start his life over and tried to open a restaurant again with Rinko to become a chef at a three-star restaurant. Obana meets with his former colleagues to persuade them to join the staff of new restaurant, but they initially reject Obana because the incident has ruined their lives. After some twists and turns, the two open a restaurant, La Grande Maison Tokyo, aiming to win three stars in the Michelin Guide, but the incident three years ago casts a dark shadow over, and running the restaurant is not smooth sailing.

== Development ==
Director Ayuko Tsukahara said that in producing this television series, she was inspired by the movie Seven Samurai. The main character, Obana, played by Kimura, and Rinko set out to win three Michelin stars, and the necessary people gather one after another to achieve this goal. And in the end, it is not the protagonist who receives the highest honor, but the dish that is the result of everyone's efforts. She then said that Obana left because she believed that a hero who helps everyone, like the samurai, encourage everyone to fend for themselves.

In this television series, all the dishes are supervised by first-class chefs and the fact that filming began at the three-star L'Ambroisie in Paris made a big splash. Owner-chef Bernard Pacaud explained how he allowed the filming at his restaurant: I had lent a restaurant once before for filming, but I did not have a good impression of it at that time. This time, there is a Japanese chef who actually works at L'Ambroisie, and I have a Japanese chef friend who trained with me and now runs a restaurant in Tokyo (Masao Saisu, Chef of Cote d'Or in Minato, Tokyo), so I know Japanese people well, and I had met with the television series' filming staff and decided that I could trust them, so I allowed the filming of the television series. The culinary supervision for La Grande Maison Tokyo was done by Chef Shuzo Kishida of the French restaurant Quintessence in Shinagawa, Tokyo, which has actually won three Michelin stars. The cooking equipment used in the kitchen of La Grande Maison Tokyo is authentic, provided by Fujimak Corporation, which actually manufactures and sells commercial cooking equipment. Chef Thomas Frebel of the French restaurant INUA in Iidabashi, Tokyo, supervised the cooking at gaku, a rival restaurant of La Grande Maison Tokyo. Restaurant gaku was actually filmed on location at Maison Paul Bocuse, a high-end restaurant in Shibuya, Tokyo. The desserts in the stories were supervised by Junji Tokunaga, chef-patissier at the InterContinental Tokyo Bay. The dessert "Mont Blanc Amafaçon," which appears in episode 4, was first conceived by Chef Kishida, and the design and presentation were arranged by Chef Tokunaga to match the setting in which the dessert was conceived by pastry chef Moe Matsui.

In addition, starring Takuya Kimura, who plays Natsuki Obana, actually cooked all the dishes in the cooking scenes. Kimura actually made 16 servings of the dish "Echube long-armed shrimp" that Obana cooked for Rinko in Paris, which was broadcast in the first episode. Kyōka Suzuki, who played Rinko Hayami, said that Kimura made everything from the very beginning of the process for the first episode, "Echube long-armed shrimp," and that they had to shoot many takes and from different angles, so they needed a lot of shrimp, but he made it all every time and it tasted delicious. The other actors playing the chef also worked hard to make their performances realistic. Yuta Tamamori, who played the role of Hirako, who worked in Paris as Obana's apprentice, said that he had not had much cooking experience before but learned how to cut vegetables and practiced by making many omelettes to give the impression that he was familiar with cooking. Onoe Kikunosuke V, who played the role of Tango, the chef of the rival restaurant gaku, is a kabuki actor. He said that his dream, other than being a kabuki actor, was to become a chef when he was a child, and that he had a fulfilling time playing this role. He said that in playing a chef, he started making breakfast at home, and his skills improved so much that his family has recently started to eat second helpings of it.

The television series was actually filmed at Embassy of France, Tokyo. The policeman who subdued Obana in the first episode was a real French policeman. On October 18, 2019, a preview was held at French ambassador's residence, where Ambassador Laurent Pic introduced Kimura, saying "I would like to introduce my friend, Takuya Kimura".

== Characters ==
=== La Grande Maison Tokyo ===
A French restaurant opened by Obana and Rinko in a corner of Meguro, Tokyo. Later, Aizawa, Kyono, Matsui, Serita, Kuzumi, and Hirako joined the staff.

Natsuki Obana (age 47)
Played by Takuya Kimura
The protagonist of this work. Sous-chef. He was once a top chef who worked at the three-star restaurant "L'Ambrosie" and later ran a two-star Michelin Guide restaurant Escoffille in Paris, but "nuts incident" prevented him from working as a chef and he led a depraved life. In Paris, he met Rinko Hayami and decided to open "La Grande Maison Tokyo" in Tokyo, aiming to win three Michelin Guide stars together.

Rinko Hayami (age 49)
Played by Kyoka Suzuki
The heroine of this work. Chef de cuisine. She has an absolute palate, but has never managed to win a star in the Michelin Guide. On her mother's recommendation, she once visited Escoffille in Paris and was impressed by Obana's cuisine. On her way to a job interview in France, she had a fateful encounter with Obana, and together they opened La Grande Maison Tokyo, aiming to win three Michelin stars.

Shohei Hirako (age 29)
Played by Yuta Tamamori
He was the youngest head chef at a hotel buffet restaurant. His work is precise and fast. He used to work under Obana at Escoffille in Paris, but "nuts incident" brought him back to Japan. He is dissatisfied with his job at the buffet, where he has to make a lot of the same dishes.

Kouichi Serita
Played by Kanichiro
Part-time employee
He is honest and cheerful. He applied for the job after seeing La Grande Maison Tokyo's part-time job opening. After graduating from high school, he had worked part-time at an izakaya (Japanese-style pub).

Moe Matsui
Played by Ayako Yoshitani
Buffet restaurant patissier
She graduated from an art college, not a culinary school. She believes that desserts should not only taste good, but also look good and be pretty. She is a colleague of Shohei and works at the same buffet restaurant.

Kanna Kuzumi
Played by Anne Nakamura
Freelance food writer
She speaks English and French. She is a certified sommelier and is familiar with domestic wines.

Kamehito Aizawa (age 47)
Played by Mitsuhiro Oikawa
Popular web cooking researcher.
He is a sociable and cheerful guy. He has a French wife and daughter. He used to work for Escoffille as a start-up staff member invited by Obana, but after "nuts incident", he separated from his wife and returned to Japan.

Rikutaro Kyono (age 49)
Played by Ikki Sawamura
'gaku' Garçon
He used to be a chef. He used to manage a restaurant with Obana in Escoffille, Paris, but after "nuts incident" he was in debt. He was invited by his former rival Tango to work as a garcon at the restaurant Gaku.

=== Restaurant "gaku" ===
A high-end restaurant located in Minami-Aoyama, Tokyo.
Manabu Tango (age 45)
Played by Onoe Kikunosuke V
Chef de cuisine. He has a strong rivalry with Obana.
He once trained as a chef at L'Ambroisie in Paris with Obana and Kyono. He set up his own restaurant ahead of Obana, but the restaurant failed because "Escoffille," which was later launched by Obana and Kyono, was awarded a star first.
Fumio Etoh
Played by Toru Tezuka
Owner. Usually speaks in a fake Kansai dialect.
The company "Office Eats" produces various restaurants and has several stores. gaku" is one of them. He is a schemer willing to use dirty tricks to turn "gaku" into a three-star restaurant. In "Gura Gura Maison Tokyo," he showed a side of himself that transformed into a man who loves to talk about love and meddle when he is drunk.

=== Others ===
Miyu Ebina
Played by Aki Asakura
She is a hotel concierge and Shohei's fiancée. Her father is a member of the Tokyo Metropolitan Assembly.

Linda Machiko Richard
Played by Ai Tominaga
Editor-in-Chief of the gourmet magazine "Marie Claire Dining". Lives in France. Former lover of Obana.
She is so influential that restaurants she praises are booked up to a year in advance and those she criticizes close their doors. She is searching for the truth about "nuts incident" that happened three years ago in Escoffille.

== Staff ==
- Script by Tsutomu Kuroiwa
- Music - Hideakira Kimura
- Theme song - "Recipe" by Tatsuro Yamashita (Warner Music Japan)
- Cooking Supervisor - Shuzo Kishida (Quintessence (restaurant)), Thomas Frebel (INUA), Hattori Nutrition College
- Culinary creation and instruction - Yukio Hattori, Tomoyuki Sekiguchi, Fumihiko Ohno
- Food coordination: Noriko Yamazaki, Sayaka Tsuru
- Desserts Supervisor - Junji Tokunaga (InterContinental Tokyo Bay), Tsutomu Takizawa
- Magazine Cooperation - Marie claire style (Note: Provide the name of the gourmet magazine Marie Claire Dining to be used in this drama.)
- Cooking Production - Hideki Ishizaka
- Coordinators - Emi Sugiyama, Yuko Kawaguchi
- Produced by Hidenori Iyoda and Keigo Higashinaka
- Directed by Ayuko Tsukahara, Daisuke Yamamuro, Takahiro Aoyama
- Production Credits: TBS Television (Japan)

== Broadcast Schedule ==
#	day of broadcast	Subtitle	TV and radio listings	direction	TV ratings
#1	20 Oct 2019	Echube of long-handled shrimps	Grab three stars! Rising from the ashes. A chef of miracles and inspiration	Ayuko Tsukahara	12.4%
#2	27 Oct 2019	Eggplant Presse	Prepare yourself! Tearful food made with friends!	Ayuko Tsukahara	13.2%
#3	3 Nov 2019	Venison Roti and Consomme	Pre-opening! Beat your competitors with meat dishes.	Daisuke Yamamuro	11.8%
#4	10 Nov 2019	Mont Blanc Amphathon	The greatest enemy appears! Tearful master-disciple showdown! Cooking completed!	Daisuke Yamamuro	13.3%
#5	17 Nov 2019	Assiparmantier	I am the culprit! Tearful confession The moving food we eat then	Ayuko Tsukahara	12.6%
#6	24 Nov 2019	Roasted Spanish mackerel with Crystal pomelo sauce	Tearful determination! Reclaim the stolen recipe!	Takahiro Aoyama	11.8%
#7	1 Dec 2019	Galette Champignon	Goodbye Dad! For my daughter, a three-star promise	Daisuke Yamamuro	11.8%
#8	8 Dec 2019	Beef stew	The future of a twisted relationship The soul inherited from the master	Ayuko Tsukahara	11.0%
#9	15 Dec 2019	Poached albacore	Who is the traitor? Stand up to tearful vengeance!	Takahiro Aoyama	14.7%
#10	22 Dec 2019	Dumi Uncourt of the pheasant	Pre-final special The Michelin Guide investigation has begun! What is the dish of tears and is the traitor friend or foe?	Daisuke Yamamuro	11.1%
#11	29 Dec 2019	Pacific bluefin tuna	Goodbye, my love. Can we get three stars? Tears of life for cooking.	Ayuko Tsukahara	16.4%
Average Viewing Rate 12.9% (Television Viewer Ratings are from Video Research, Kanto region, households, real time)

== Blu-ray and DVD ==
La Grande Maison Tokyo had released Blu-ray and DVD.

- Released by TC Entertainment on 24 April 2020
  - 4-disc Blu-ray set (feature: 3 discs, bonus footage: 1 disc)
  - 6-disc DVD set (feature: 5 discs, bonus footage: 1 disc)

Special features include the making of the film, 'Gura Gura Maison Tokyo' and more.

== Reception ==
The television series La Grande Maison Tokyo was well received by viewers and received 98 points (full score of 100 points) in the "Drama Value" survey by Confidence, a comprehensive entertainment market research magazine, tying its highest score and the highest score for a television series this season. The final episode also recorded the program's best viewer rating of 16.4%, the top rating in the same time slot and the program's best. In addition, the overall ratings (real-time ratings plus time-shift ratings) exceeded 20% for all episodes. Oricon News attributes the television series's favorable reception to the buzz surrounding the start of filming in Paris, filming at the three-star L'Ambroisie restaurant in Paris, the cooperation of the French Embassy in filming, the three-star restaurant Quintessence of Chef Shuzo Kishida in Tokyo, and the up-and-coming and talked-about restaurant INUA, which is supervising the cooking of the television series.

== Awards ==
Award	Category	Name	Result
The 103rd The Television Drama Academy Awards	Best Work Award	La Grande Maison Tokyo	Won
The 103rd The Television Drama Academy Awards	Best Actor	Takuya Kimura	Won
The 103rd The Television Drama Academy Awards	Best Supporting Actor	Yuta Tamamori	Won
The 103rd The Television Drama Academy Awards	Best Director	Ayuko Tsukahara	Won
The 103rd The Television Drama Academy Awards	Best Drama Song	Tatsuro Yamashita	Won
29th TV Life Annual Drama Awards	Best Supporting Actor	Yuta Tamamori	Won

== Remake ==
In February, 2025, TBS TV announced that La Grande Maison Tokyo would have a Turkish and Korean remake. In collaboration with Dass Yapim and Film monster, development of the work would begin under the leadership of producers in both countries.

== Gura Gura Maison Tokyo (Shohei Hirako's wavering feelings) ==
Gura Gura Maison Tokyo
- The poster of Gura Gura Maison Tokyo
- Also known as: Shohei Hirako's Wavering Feelings
- Japanese: グラグラメゾン東京～平古祥平の揺れる思い～
- Genre: Romantic comedy, Drama
- Written by: Okura
- Presented by: Paravi
- Starring: Yuta Tamamori
- Country of origin: Japan
- Original language: Japanese
- No. of episodes: 11

Original release
- Network: TBS Television (Japan)
- Release: October 21 – December 30, 2019

"Gura Gura Maison Tokyo (Shohei Hirako's wavered feelings)" (Note: "Gura Gura" is the Japanese word for "wavered".) is a romantic comedy drama and spin-off drama of "Grand Maison Tokyo". It was distributed weekly on the video distribution service Paravi from midnight after the end of the main series. With Shohei Hirako as the protagonist, it depicts his growth and struggles as a chef, and his love triangle with his fiancé Miyu Ebina and his colleague Moe Matsui.

In TBS Television (Japan) and Kanto region local, a digest version was broadcast every Thursday from 24 October at 1:28am – 1:33am (late night on Wednesdays, time may vary from week to week). A digest version was available on TVer (streaming service) as an extra to the main Grand Maison Tokyo. This romantic comedy starring Tamamori had performed well, recording the highest number of views in the first month of distribution.

The script was written by Okura(オークラ), who also works as a variety show writer and broadcaster. According to Okura, he had previously mentioned that he wanted to write a comedy script, and when he was approached about this spin-off drama, it became a reality. He said it was fun to write the script while imagining what might have actually happened behind the scenes of the main drama.

=== Story ===
In 'Gura Gura Maison Tokyo', Shohei Heiko's feelings, which were not depicted in the main episode 'Guran Maison Tokyo', and his indecisive wavering between two women, are depicted. Its final episode depicted the future several years after the final episode of the main 'Grand Maison Tokyo'.

Episode 1 "Unfulfilled feelings of Shohei Hirako"
Shohei Heiko (Yuta Tamamori), a chef at a hotel buffet restaurant, feels unsatisfied with his routine of preparing predetermined dishes. However, his fiancée, Miyu Ebina (Aki Asakura), is unaware of Shohei's feelings.

Episode 2 "Emotions that Shohei Hirako was unaware of"
Shohei (Yuta Tamamori) is invited to dinner by Seido Ebina, the father of Miyu (Aki Asakura) and a big politician. Shohei did not like this man. After work, he went to dinner with Moe and listened to his complaints, but lied to Miyu that he had been drinking alone.

Episode 3 "Shohei Hirako's embarrassing encounters"
Shohei (Yuta Tamamori) is troubled by Miyu's (Aki Asakura) bad mood. Shohei's encounter with Miyu was fateful. So he goes for a drink with his colleague Moe to discuss her...

Episode 4 "Worst possible timing for Shohei Hirako"
Shohei (Yuta Tamamori) has been coming home late to help Moe (Ayako Yoshitani) with her work. Meanwhile, Miyu (Aki Asakura) is in a bad mood because she suspects Shohei is having an affair. So Shohei goes out for dinner with her at a high-class restaurant to try to put her in a better mood...

Episode 5 "Strong determination of Shohei Hirako"
Shohei (Yuta Tamamori) breaks his promise to Miyu's (Aki Asakura) father and gets involved with Natsuki Obana (Takuya Kimura). So he breaks up with Miyu, as her father says. Shohei helps out at the Grand Maison Tokyo festival and rediscovers the joy of cooking. Moe (Ayako Yoshitani) sees Shohei working happily and realises she is in love with him.

Episode 6 "The indelible mistakes of Shohei Hirako"
Shohei (Yuta Tamamori) begins working at Gaku, a Michelin Guide two-star restaurant where Ogana's rival Gaku Tamba (Kikunosuke Onoe V) is a master chef. Shohei starts drinking with Moe and his colleagues at the invitation of a colleague. Moe is angry with Shohei for moving to 'Gaku', but as the drinking progresses, Moe's honest affection for Shohei gradually comes to the fore.

Episode 7 "The very fateful reunion of Shohei Hirako"
Shohei (Yuta Tamamori) faces Tango (Kikunosuke Onoe V) and his cooking in his quest to become a Top 50 restaurant. Meanwhile, Shohei meets Moe (Yoshitani Ayako) again. What are Moe's true feelings?

Episode 8 "Shohei Hirako and his friends, each night"
Shohei (Yuta Tamamori), Miyu (Aki Asakura) and Moe (Ayako Yoshitani) go their separate ways. At a drinking party, Shohei is told by a drunk Kakitani (Yusuke Onuki) and Moe's junior Kurumi (Mika Nagai) that he is a plague that makes everyone around him unhappy.

Episode 9 "Two confessions of Shohei Hirako"
Shohei (Yuta Tamamori) meets Moe (Ayako Yoshitani) again after a long time. On his way home, Shohei happens to meet Kyono (Sawamura Kazuki), who confides his feelings for him and gives him a push. Shohei then goes to Linda (Ai Tominaga) and confesses everything about the nut incident.

Episode 10 "The true feelings of Shohei Hirako"
Shohei (Yuta Tamamori) tells Miyu (Aki Asakura) that he kissed Moe (Ayako Yoshitani) and that he is the culprit in the nut-laced incident. Meanwhile, Shohei is told a shocking truth by Kakitani about his relationship with Miyu!

Episode 11 "The departure of Shohei Hirako"
The world is several years after the Michelin Guide awards ceremony. Shohei (Yuta Tamamori) and the people around him have undergone various changes.

=== Cast and Staff ===
- Shohei Hirako :Played by Yuta Tamamori
- Miyu Ebina :Played by Aki Asakura
- Moe Matsui :Played by Ayako Yoshitani

Guest starring
- Chef 1 (Arata Takasugi) :Played by Sho Kaga (Kagaya)
- Cook 2 (Tonpei Mashima) :Played by Soya Kaya (Kagaya)

Subordinate in the buffet restaurant where Shohei was chef.

- Kurumi Sugiyama :Played by Mijika Nagai : Moe's junior in school.
- Bartender :Played by Naoto Eguchi (Dobrokku)
- Bar master :Played by Kyujitsu Kacho
Staff
- Script by Okura
- Produced by - Keigo Higashinaka, Hidenori Iyoda
- Direction by Daisuke Yamamuro, Takahiro Aoyama
- Production and copyright by TBS Television (Japan)

Streaming schedule

	Date of Streaming	Subtitle	Guest
#1	21 Oct 2019	Unfulfilled feelings of Shohei Hirako	
#2	28 Oct 2019	Emotions that Shohei Hirako was unaware of	Hisafumi Iwashita
#3	4 Nov 2019	Shohei Hirako's embarrassing encounters	Hideyo Fujita, Toru Teduka
#4	11 Nov 2019	Worst possible timing for Shohei Hirako	Koudou Sato, Toru Teduka, Onoe Kikunosuke V
#5	18 Nov 2019	Strong determination of Shohei Hirako	Hideyo Fujita, Hisafumi Iwashita, Onoe Kikunosuke V
#6	25 Nov 2019	The indelible mistakes of Shohei Hirako	Toru Teduka, Onoe Kikunosuke V
#7	2 Dec 2019	The very fateful reunion of Shohei Hirako	Chris Peppler, Kanichiro, Toru Teduka, Onoe Kikunosuke V
#8	9 Dec 2019	Shohei Hirako and his friends, each night	Yusuke Ohnuki, Anne Nakamura, Mitsuhiro Oikawa
#9	16 Dec 2019	Two confessions of Shohei Hirako	Kanichiro, Yusuke Ohnuki, Anne Nakamura, Ikki Sawamura
#10	23 Dec 2019	The true feelings of Shohei Hirako	Hisafumi Iwashita, Yusuke Ohnuki, Toru Teduka, Kyoka Suzuki
#11	30 Dec 2019	The departure of Shohei Hirako	Oniyakko Tsubaki, Hisafumi Iwashita, Yusuke Ohnuki, Toru Teduka, Onoe Kikunosuke V

== Other ==
- With the first episode "Echube the long-armed shrimp", the Sunday Gekijo reached 3,000 broadcasts (including the days of the one-off slot and the Toshiba Sunday Gekijo).
- One month after the drama finished airing, Kei Kobayashi of Restaurant KEI in Paris won the first ever three stars for a Japanese in the Michelin Guide published in France on 27 January 2020, something that Obana was unable to achieve during his time at Escoffille in the drama.

== Film ==
On December 30, 2024, a film La Grande Maison Paris, which depicts their challenge in Paris, France, will be distributed by Toho as a sequel to the special episode La Grande Maison Tokyo Special scheduled to air on December 29, 2024.
