= Anne Nakamura =

Japanese actress, model and tarento (born 1987)

- 中村 アン
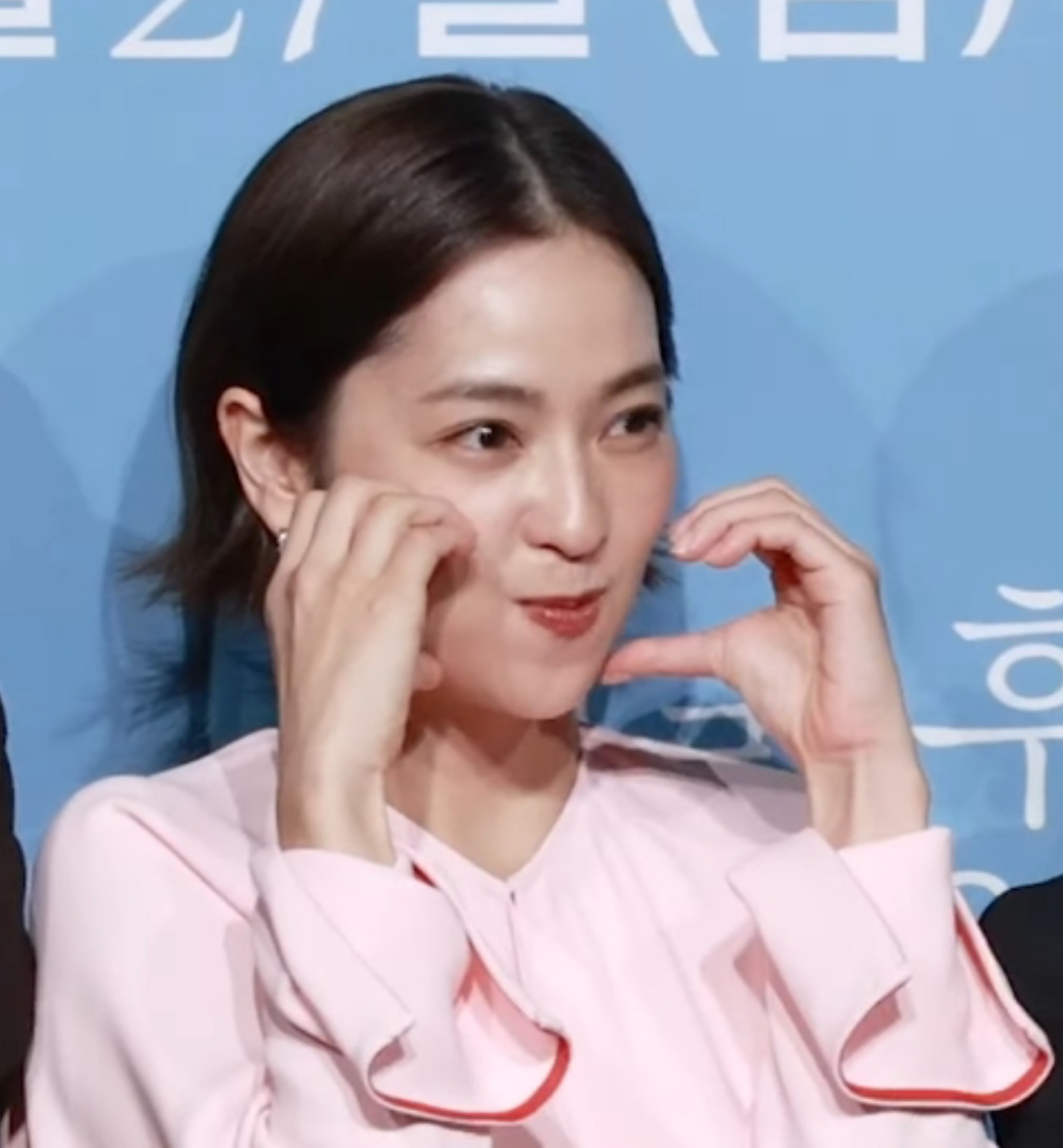
- Born: Yuko Nakamura; 17 September 1987 (age 39); Koto, Tokyo, Japan
- Education: Toyo Eiwa University
- Occupations: Model; talent; actress
- Years active: 2009–present
- Agent: Platinum Production
- Height: 1.61 m (5 ft 3 in) (2013)

Anne Nakamura (中村 アン, Nakamura An; born 17 September 1987, in Koto, Tokyo) is a Japanese actress, model, and tarento. Her real name is Yuko Nakamura (中村 友子, Nakamura Yūko).

Nakamura is represented with Platinum Production.

== Biography ==
Nakamura was born in Fukagawa, Koto, Tokyo. She graduated from Koto Ward Elementary School, Mejiro Gakuen Junior and Senior High School (now Mejiro Kenshin Junior and Senior High School) and Toyo Eiwa University. From her high school to college years Nakamura was part of the cheerleading team and served as the captain during her third year at high school, and participated in the national competition during both high school and college.

When she was a sophomore in college, she participated in a model audition from a form invited by her friend and won the Grand Prix. But Nakamura did not join the entertainment industry, and although she was finding employment during her third year in university she thought of entering the entertainment industry, she later entered to her current agent where she received an offer and made her debut.

While working as a model in fashion magazines and appearing in television programmes, she became a member of G Race in 2010 and served as a Super GT Image Girl, and in 2014 she also worked as an image model for keirin (cycle racing).

On 6 October 2015, Nakamura was awarded the "Sunglasses Department" award of the 28th Japan Megane Best Dresser Award.

According to a Lespas fitness awareness survey, she was chosen in first place of the women's ideal figure.

== Works ==
=== Albums ===
G Race

Year	Title	Song
2010	Super Eurobeat presents Super GT 2010	"Fly High!!"
2010	Super Eurobeat presents Super GT 2010 -Second Round-	"Fly Again"

=== Books ===
Year	Title
2014	Anne Balance

== Filmography ==
=== TV programmes ===
Year	Title	Notes	Ref.
2016	#nakedEve		

=== TV drama ===
Year	Title	Role	Notes	Ref.
2015	5→9 From Five to Nine	Ran Ino		
2016	Kazoku no Katachi	Aya Kozue		
2016	O Gifu-san to Yoba sete	Kiwa Aikawa		
2016	Eigyō Buchō: Natsuko Kira	Tomomi Imanishi		
2019	La Grande Maison Tokyo	Kanna Kuzumi		
2021	Japan Sinks: People of Hope	Misuzu Aihara		
2022	DCU: Deep Crime Unit	Takako Nariai		
2023	Ōoku: The Inner Chambers	Noto / Shima		
2024	La Grande Maison Tokyo Special	Kanna Kuzumi		
2024	What Comes After Love	Kobayashi Kanna		
2025	Omusubi	Reina Kamata	Asadora	
2025	Sai: Disaster	Midori Domoto		

=== Films ===
Year	Title	Role	Notes	Ref.
2021	The Master Plan	Risa		
2021	Masquerade Night	Mayumi Okuda		
2024	La Grande Maison Paris	Kanna Kuzumi		
2026	Sai: Disaster	Midori Domoto		
2026	You, Like a Star	Eri Nikaido		

=== Japanese dub ===
Year	Title	Role	Notes	Ref.
2016	Finding Dory	Destiny		

=== Video games ===
Year	Title	Notes	Ref.
2010	Kurohyō: Ryū ga Gotoku Shinshō	Appeared in CG with Yuu Tejima and Aya Hoshi	

== Awards ==
Year	Award	Ref.
2015	12th Cotton USA Award Miss Cotton USA	
2015	2nd Bride Award	
2015	28th Japan Megane Best Dresser Award Sunglasses Sector	
