= Jellyfish Eyes =

- Film poster
- Kanji: めめめのくらげ
- Directed by: Takashi Murakami
- Screenplay by: Jun Tsugita; Yoshihiro Nishimura
- Story by: Takashi Murakami
- Produced by: Chiaki Kasahara; Yoshihiro Nishimura
- Starring: Takuto Sueoka; Himeka Asami; Takumi Saitoh
- Cinematography: Yasutaka Nagano
- Edited by: Yoshihiro Nishimura
- Music by: kz (livetune); Yoshihiro Ike
- Distributed by: GAGA Corporation; Janus Films (United States)
- Release dates: April 8, 2013 (Los Angeles premiere); April 26, 2013 (Japan)
- Running time: 101 minutes
- Country: Japan
- Language: Japanese

Jellyfish Eyes (めめめのくらげ, Mememe no Kurage) is a 2013 Japanese fantasy film directed by contemporary artist Takashi Murakami. His debut feature film, it was released in Japan on April 26, 2013.

Jellyfish Eyes was released on Blu-ray in Japan on January 24, 2014; The Criterion Collection released the film on DVD and Blu-ray in North America on December 8, 2015. A sequel to the film was announced. However, the film has since been canceled due to a variety of factors. Though on February 10, 2022, Murakami announced that he was restarting production.

== Plot ==
Masashi Kusakabe has just moved to a suburban town, where lush, green rice paddies stretch out on both sides of the road, to start a new life alone with his mother, Yasuko. Although overwhelmed with sadness after losing his father, Masashi acts cheerful for the sake of his mother. As he goes about carrying boxes into their new apartment, Masashi feels a mysterious presence in the room.

The next day, upon returning home from visiting the new elementary school, Masashi encounters a strange creature that looks like a jellyfish. Masashi names the adorable creature, which loves chee-kama (cheese-and-fish-cake sticks) and freely flies around, Kurage-bo (Jellyfish Boy). Despite the lack of a common language, they take to each other immediately and become friends.

Masashi goes to school with Kurage-bo hidden in his backpack. He is anxious that someone might find out his secret, but then is astonished to discover that everyone in his new class has one of these strange creatures, which they call F.R.I.E.N.D.s, as his or her companion. The minute the teacher turns her back to the classroom, the children take out their controllers, called Devices, with which they generate and manipulate their F.R.I.E.N.D.s. Tatsuya challenges Masashi, but Kurage-bo comes to his rescue and beats Tatsuya's F.R.I.E.N.D, Yupi in combat with impeccable kung-fu skill.

Masashi comes home to find his uncle, Naoto, who works at the local research center, arguing with his mother at the door. "This town is dangerous," Naoto appeals to Yasuko. She retorts with anger, "You want us out of here?" Later, Naoto makes Masashi promise to report to him if he notices anything strange. Although Naoto takes note of Kurage-bo in Masashi's backpack, he doesn't bring it up.

One day on his way home from school, Masashi comes across his classmates playing on the grounds of a shrine, making their F.R.I.E.N.D.s fight one another. The boys try to force Masashi to join the battle, but Kurage-bo is nowhere to be seen and the F.R.I.E.N.D.s are upon him. At the crucial moment, enormous and powerful Luxor appears together with Kurage-bo and they fight the F.R.I.E.N.D.s off. Luxor, Masashi finds out, is his classmate Saki's F.R.I.E.N.D.

Saki reveals to Masashi that her Device was given to her, at a time when she was feeling down about family problems, by the top-level members of the research center. Cloaked in black, the four told her that the Device would give her "a friend who will never betray." They gave out Devices to all the elementary school students in town. Soon the children started putting F.R.I.E.N.D.s against F.R.I.E.N.D.s in battle, and now these battles take place all over.

Meanwhile, a school festival is going on at the university, where Naoto's research center is located. The cult group to which Saki's mother, Shizuko (Asuka Kurosawa), belongs claims that the research going on at the university is evil and dangerous. They have organized a protest. When Shizuko presses Saki to pray with her, Masashi and Saki run away hand-in-hand and end up stepping into the midst of the research center. The Black-Cloaked Four, seeing the powerful energy in Masashi, start plotting to trap him in their hands.

Having shared their problems with one another, Masashi and Saki start to develop a bond. But Tatsuya and Juran, who have found out that Naoto works for the research center, conspire against Masashi and kidnap Kurage-bo. When the gym teacher saw this, she punish Tatsuya and the group for hurting Masashi and Saki getting bumped in the head when she tried to save him. While visiting Masashi, who is injured by Yupi and hospitalized, Naoto gives him a Device "as protection," but something seems amiss.

Later Masashi's mom tells him that Naoto fell of the building and died. At the forest, Masashi looked for Kurage-bo but he was not seen, revealing that Kurage had been thrown into a locker in a junkyard and was beaten down. Saki finds him and she ask Masashi where is device is. Masashi said that his device didn't work and Kurage-Bo's gone, blaming Tatsuya and Juran for this mess. Saki still believe that she hates fighting and bullies but they have to try and she and Masashi head to the lab. At the Lab, Tatsuya and Juran meets the Cloak Four to challenge Koh, a boy who lives in the Orphanage. Koh uses an anime girl named Ko2 and battled Yupi and Shimon and managed to kill Yupi and Shimon. As she was about to finish them off until Masashi saves them. Masashi was then being choke by a F.R.I.E.N.D Naoto. Tatsuya and Juran tells Koh that he doesn't have to be alone. The real Naoto comes out just in time to fight the duplicate. Finally understanding what it means to be with friends, Koh allowed Ko2 to destroy the fake Naoto.

Naoto tells the Cloak Four why they did this and why they tried to kill Masashi, to reveal that they want to be reborn from the destruction, that's why they sent the kids to fight for negative energy. Naoto said that they're insane and then scolded at Tatsuya and Juran for hurting Masashi. Naoto tells the others to head outside before the Oval destroys everything. Koh stays behind to find the Oval's weak spot while the others head back to the main street. Tatsuya calls Manato to look outside which he tells the other kids to call every F.R.I.E.N.D.s outside to fight the Oval.

Saki, meanwhile, tried to saved her mother but she got caught and tries to hold on the iron railings in the Oval's mouth. Just as she falls, Masashi catches her and getting her safely to the ground. Finally, Naoto tells Masashi that the Oval's weak spot is on the glowing orb on the head. Masashi finishes the Oval off and all of the F.R.I.E.N.D.s disappear into the vortex, Including Kurage-bo.

Devastated, Masashi mourns over his lost friend and Saki was sad too saying that he stayed with him right until the end. Koh brings his friends and Tatsuya and Juran apologize for their selfish actions and behavior. Koh uses his phone and brought back all the F.R.I.E.N.D.s back to the real world. Reunited at last, Masashi, Saki, Kurage-bo and everyone started to give in to their positive ways and embraced them.

[4][5][6]

== Cast ==
- Takuto Sueoka as Masashi Kusakabe, a kind-hearted sixth-grader who lost his father in the earthquake and ensuing natural disaster. He has just moved with his mother to Tsugumo City, where his uncle Naoto lives and works. Although he acts cheerfully in front of his mother, he hasn't recovered from the loss of his father or the shock of the disaster. His favorite food is chee-kama, a processed food manufactured by his father's company. He transfers to a private elementary school, Tsugumo Uraka Gakuen, which upholds discipline and safety, but from day one, he becomes the target of bullying by Tatsuya. Through his encounter with Kurage-bo, the only F.R.I.E.N.D. that doesn't require any Device, Masashi learns the meaning of true friendship and the ties that bind.
- Himeka Asami as Saki Amamiya, Masashi's classmate who cares about him. Mature and cool for an elementary school student, she despises fights and conflicts. She is fed up with her classmates constantly battling against one another through their F.R.I.E.N.D.s. With a strong sense of justice, however, she stands up against Tatsuya and Juran in order to save Masashi. Because her mother is an ardent follower of a new cult, World Salvation Society, Saki has to suffer through many of the cult's gatherings. At home, her parents never stop arguing...
- Masataka Kubota, Hidemasa Shiozawa, Shota Sometani and Ami Ikenaga as The Black-Cloaked Four, a group of four geniuses working on a mysterious research project at the institution set up by the government within Tsugumo University. Supposedly they are colleagues of Naoto, Masashi's uncle, yet there is something suspicious about them. They scheme to summon the most powerful of the F.R.I.E.N.D.s, Oval, by exploiting the negative energy of the children. Ruthless and merciless, the researchers stop at nothing in order to achieve their goals.
- Asuka Kurosawa as Shizuko Amamiya, Saki's mother. In discord with her husband, she is a member of a new cult, the World Salvation Society, and is constantly dragging her daughter to its meetings.
- Kanji Tsuda as Tatsuo Kusakabe, Masashi's father. He owned a seafood processing plant. Although lost to the tsunami, he remains vividly in Masashi's mind as a hard-working, cheerful father.
- Mayu Tsuruta as Yasuko Kusakabe, Masashi's mother. Having lost her husband in the disasters, she starts a new life with her son in a new town. Although full off sorrow and worries, she acts steadfast and cheerful in front of Masashi.
- Takumi Saitoh as Naoto Kōzuka, a technician at the research facility of the Black-Cloaked Four. He is Masashi's uncle and one of the few adults Masashi can rely on after losing his father. Although he values the research he is involved in, he also knows its danger; he has opposed his sister Yasuko and his nephew Masashi's move to Tsugumo City. He struggles with a dilemma between his research and the safety of his family. He later knew that the Black-Cloaked Four wanted to bring destruction.

== F.R.I.E.N.D.S. ==
- Kurage-bo

Masashi's F.R.I.E.N.D. 38 cm tall. The only F.R.I.E.N.D. able to exist without a Device, it is a standout among them. In a pinch, it displays brilliant combat capability that belies its goofy appearance. Its fighting technique has elements of kung-fu moves. Having encountered Masashi, full of sorrow, it continues to enhance its power by transforming adversity into energy.

- Luxor

Saki's F.R.I.E.N.D. Approx. 250 cm tall.It can always be depended on. It is strong enough to easily pick up children and single-handedly block a collapsing wall. It becomes friends with Kurage-bo right away. Always at Saki's side to ease her worries, it takes daily walks with her.

- Yupi

Tatsuya's F.R.I.E.N.D. Approx. 52 cm tall. Fiercely aggressive, it looks like a mix between a frog and a Komodo dragon. It is equipped with an extendable tongue, a rock-hard head, outstanding jumping power, and the ability to become transparent.

- Shimon

Juran's F.R.I.E.N.D. Approx. 60 cm tall. With a head of steel and 10 vernier thrusters (rocket nozzles), it is able to fly with the help of jet sprays.

- Ukki

Manato's F.R.I.E.N.D. Approx. 26 cm tall. Despite its cute monkey look, it can be quick and sometimes even mean.

- Ko2 (Koko)

Koh's F.R.I.E.N.D. 187.96 cm tall. Controlled by Koh's customized Device, she is a human-shaped friend with powerful fighting ability. She fights in a style distinctive from the others, using such techniques as Hadōken (Surge Fist).

- Oval

Approx. 40 m tall. The creature the Black-Cloaked Four has been working to summon for some time. It is the largest F.R.I.E.N.D. and requires a medium in order to appear in this world, and Masashi becomes that long-awaited medium. It is also the embodiment of the energy of all F.R.I.E.N.D.s.

== Theme song ==
The theme song of Jellyfish Eyes is "Last Night, Good Night (Re:Dialed)" by livetune feat. Hatsune Miku, from the compilation album Re:Dial (TOY'S FACTORY).

== Release ==
The film had its world premiere in Los Angeles.

=== Critical response ===
Jellyfish Eyes received generally negative reviews from critics, with common criticisms going towards its derivative nature and underwhelming story. On Rotten Tomatoes, the film holds an 29% approval rating on the website Rotten Tomatoes based on fourteen reviews, indicating that only four of those reviews were positive, while on Metacritic it garnered a weighted mean of 34 out of 100 based on five reviews. A reviewer for The New York Times dismissed the movie's camera work, "tedious and hideous" audio such as the overuse of screaming and the overly-bright score, incompetent special effects and inconsistent pacing. On the other hand, Chuck Bowen at Slant Magazine gave the movie 3 out of 4 stars, saying, "the filmmaker's distinct achievement resides in his blending of the cynical and wondrous. Jellyfish Eyes has an exhilaratingly naïve ending in which the playthings are cleansed of their impure origins and restored to the children as pure articles of the latter's creative process. It's an ending that smacks of protest via contrast, as Murakami is clearly asking: Why must we live in a world in which this idealism is naïve?"

=== Release history ===
Jellyfish Eyes was released on Blu-ray in Japan by Toho on January 24, 2014.

On June 24, 2015, American art house distributor Janus Films acquired the rights to distribute Jellyfish Eyes in North America, which was then released on July 15, 2015.

On December 8, 2015, The Criterion Collection released Jellyfish Eyes for Region 1 on DVD and Blu-ray, both of which include a new interview with the film's director Takashi Murakami, two new documentaries about the film's production, a trailer for the cancelled sequel Jellyfish Eyes 2, and an English subtitle translation for the film, along with an essay on the film by critic Glen Helfand.
