= Mitsuhiro Oikawa =

Japanese musician, composer, and actor (born 1969)

Mitsuhiro Oikawa 及川 光博
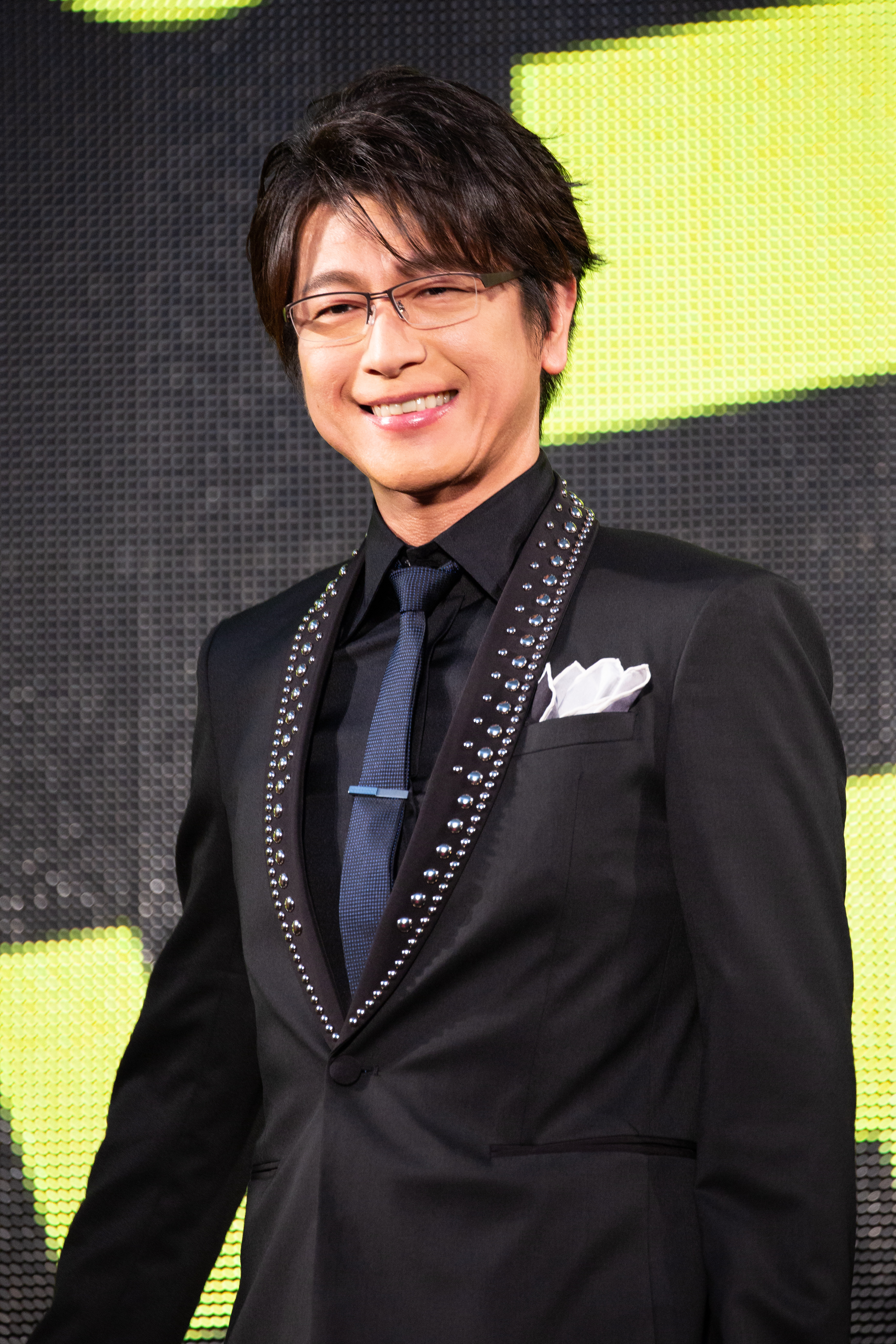
- Oikawa in 2018

Background information
- Also known as: Mitchy; Prince
- Born: October 24, 1969 (age 56); Ota, Japan
- Genres: Pop; Funk; Rock
- Occupations: Musician; singer-songwriter; composer; actor
- Instruments: Vocals; guitar
- Years active: 1996–present
- Label: Horipro Inc.
- Spouses: Rei Dan (m. 2011; div. 2018); Unknown (m. 2026)
- Website: oikawa-mitsuhiro.com

Mitsuhiro Oikawa (及川 光博, Oikawa Mitsuhiro; born October 24, 1969, in Ōta, Tokyo, Japan) is a Japanese musician, singer-songwriter, composer and actor who is represented by the talent agency, Mother Enterprise. He graduated from Seijo Gakuen Junior High School and High School and Seijo University Faculty of Law. He is business partners with Horipro.

== Career ==
Mitsuhiro Oikawa started as a stage theater actor through his band activities, and started his singing debut with the single, "Morality" on 1996. Since his debut, he had been the self-proclaimed "Prince", and on August 22, 1998 on Hitori no Big Show 98: Mamiya no Seisen he had a "Prince Career Change Declaration".

On 1998, Mitsuhiro Oikawa started as an actor and appeared on the drama, With Love.

On July 31, 2012, Mitsuhiro Oikawa announced a business partnership with Horipro. His works on television dramas, films, and advertisements will be active in the Horipro affiliation, while his music activities and his fan club management is continued with his affiliation agreement with his current office, Mother Enterprise.

On July 6, 2015, Mitsuhiro Oikawa announced that he amicably terminated the contract of Mother Enterprise. His future management business, including his acting activities were entrusted to DG Agent, and continues his partnership with Horipro.

In 2023, he played an antagonist role in the cooking drama Fermat Kitchen.

== Personal life ==
On July 27, 2011, Mitsuhiro Oikawa married actress, Rei Dan. The two reportedly began dating after meeting in 2009. On November 28, 2018, Oikawa and Rei Dan amicably divorced after seven years of marriage, citing their busy careers and being unable to spend time together as the cause.

On August 8, 2026, Oikawa's agency announced that he had registered his second marriage to his new partner after dating for a few years and that the couple is expecting their first child. She is reportedly not a celebrity.

== Filmography ==
=== TV series ===
Year	Title	Role	Notes	Ref.	
1998	With Love	Haruhiko Yoshida			
2002	Toshiie and Matsu	Maeda Toshimasu	Taiga drama		
2003	Manhattan Love Story	Hideki Bessho			
2004	The Great White Tower	Gakumon Kunihira			
2010	Ryōmaden	Ōkubo Toshimichi	Taiga drama		
2013	Yae's Sakura	Kido Takayoshi	Taiga drama		
2013	The Knife and the Sword	Oda Nobunaga			
2013–2020	Naoki Hanzawa	Shinobu Tomari	2 seasons		
2014	Akka	Fuyuhiko Nonomiya	Lead role		
2016	Sumi ka Sumire	Rei			
2019	La Grande Maison Tokyo	Kamehito Aizawa			
2021	Dragon Sakura S2	Vice Principal Takahara	2023	Burn the House Down	Osamu Mitarai
Fermat's Cuisine	Kagekatsu Saimon		2023		
2024	La Grande Maison Tokyo Special	Kamehito Aizawa			
2025	Chosen Home	Gen'ichi Hatano	Lead role		

=== Films ===
Year	Title	Role	Notes	Ref.
1999	Adolescence of Utena	Akio Ohtori	Voice	
2004	Casshern	Kaoru Naito		
2006	Memories of Tomorrow	Takehiro Yoshida		
2006	Sinking of Japan	Tatsuya Yuki		
2006	Oh! Oku	Manabe Akifusa		
2014	Unsung Hero	Toshihisa Nishio	Cameo	
2016	Erased	Gaku Yashiro/Manabu Yatsushiro		
2018	The Crimes That Bind			
2019	You Shine in the Moonlit Night			
2022	Love Like the Falling Petals	Kyōsuke Sawai		
2024	La Grande Maison Paris	Kamehito Aizawa		
2025	Love Song	Jin	Thai-Japanese film	
