= Samurai Kids =

- Film poster
- Directed by: Nobuhiko Obayashi
- Screenplay by: Masumi Suetani
- Story by: Masumi Suetani
- Produced by: Yoshinori Moniwa
- Starring: Tsutomu Yamazaki; Ryō Yoshida; Ayumi Ito; Tomoyo Harada
- Cinematography: Yoshitaka Sakamoto
- Edited by: Nobuhiko Obayashi
- Music by: Joe Hisaishi
- Production companies: Fuji-TV; Office 21; Toho Co., Ltd; Right Vision
- Distributed by: Toho
- Release date: 17 July 1993 (Japan)
- Running time: 106 minutes
- Country: Japan
- Language: Japanese

Samurai Kids (Japanese: 水の旅人 侍KIDS, Hepburn: Mizu no Tabibito Samurai Kiddzu; lit. 'Water Traveller-Samurai Kids') is a 1993 Japanese fantasy adventure film directed by Nobuhiko Obayashi from a story and screenplay written by Masumi Suetani.

== Cast ==
- Tsutomu Yamazaki as Sutonahiko Suminoe (sometimes referred to as 'old man' by Satoru), a miniature samurai who is discovered by a little boy in a river.
- Ryō Yoshida as Satoru, a young boy.
- Ayumi Ito as Chizuko, Satoru's sister.
- Jun Fubuki as Yuuko, Satoru's mother.
- Kiyotaka Nanbara
- Onoe Ushinosuke VI
- Tōru Yuri
- Tomoyo Harada as Yuki, a librarian who introduces Satoru to the legends of miniature samurai.
- Ittoku Kishibe as Fumihiro, Satoru's father.
- Ishirō Honda as Grandfather—Obayashi included Honda's portrait as a posthumous cameo, honouring him as a filmmaker, and paying respects to him as a friend.

== Release ==
Samurai Kids was distributed theatrically in Japan by Toho on 17 July 1993. In the Philippines, the film was released as My Little Bodyguard on 24 August 1995.

== Reception ==
Samurai Kids won an Excellence – Silver Award for Japanese Movies in the 11th Golden Gross Awards. The film also won two awards at the Japanese Academy Awards: Best Music Score for Joe Hisaishi and the Popularity Award for the Most Popular Film.
