= Aki Asakura =

Japanese actress (born 1991)

- 朝倉 あき
- Born: September 23, 1991 (age 34); Kanagawa Prefecture, Japan
- Occupation: Actress
- Years active: 2006 - 2014; 2015 - present
- Agents: Toho Entertainment (2007 - 2014); Konyi (2015 - 2022); Japan Music Entertainment (since 2022)
- Website: Aki Asakura on Instagram; Japan Music Entertainment

Aki Asakura (Japanese: 朝倉 あき, Hepburn: Asakura Aki) is a Japanese actress. She was born in Kanagawa Prefecture. Currently belongs to Japan Music Entertainment. She has appeared in many of Japan's national television series NHK taiga drama and asadora, and is also known for voicing the main character Princess Kaguya in the Studio Ghibli film The Tale of the Princess Kaguya.

== History ==
In 2006, Asakura applied for the 6th Toho Cinderella Audition, an audition sponsored by Toho and Toho Entertainment, and was selected as a finalist. She did not win the prize at that time, but she attracted attention and became a Toho Entertainment talent and entered the show business. According to her, the audition was recommended to her by others. In 2007, she made her acting debut in the television series When I was a child: Actress Yuki Saito, and in the following year, 2008, she made her first film appearance in Double Trouble. In 2010, She first starred in a television series, Tomehane! Suzuri Kōkō Shodōbu. Following this, she played the role of the protagonist's friend in the NHK broadcast asadora TV series Teppan, which started to air in September 2010.

In 2013, Asakura voiced Princess Kaguya, the heroine of the Studio Ghibli film The Tale of the Princess Kaguya. She has loved Ghibli films since childhood, but had no previous experience of voice acting. Hundreds of people applied for the audition for this role, which was held around spring 2011. She said that she did not respond well to the audition and went home crying, thinking she had failed. Director Isao Takahata said he chose Asakura because many actresses today have passive voices, but her voice was selfish.

At the end of March 2014, Asakura terminated her contract with Toho Entertainment and temporarily suspended her acting career. She later said that she needed a break at the time and also said she spent her time working part-time in an office during her hiatus of about a year.

In 2015 she returned to show business when she became affiliated with the entertainment agency Konyi and had her first starring role in a film in Halloween Nightmare. In 2017, the film Summer Blooms, in which he starred, won the FIPRESCI Jury Prize and Russian Critics Jury Special Mention at the 39th Moscow International Film Festival.

She was scheduled to appear in the stage production of Frozen Beach starting in July 2019, but had to withdraw due to health problem. At the end of February 2022, she terminated her contract with the entertainment agency Konyi. In December of the same year, she announced that she would be joining Japan Music Entertainment.

== Filmography ==
=== Film ===
Year	Title	Role	Notes	Ref.
2008	Double Trouble	Ayaka Ohta		
2013	The Tale of the Princess Kaguya	Princess Kaguya (voice)	Leading role	
2015	Halloween Nightmare	Saki Morinaka	Leading role	
2018	Summer Blooms	Hatsumi Takimoto	Leading role	
2019	Whistleblower	Yui Hamamoto		
2020	Beyond the Infinite Two Minutes	Megumi		
2020	Masked Ward	Nao		
2022	The Fish Tale	Program assistant		
2022	A Mother's Touch			
2025	Catching the Stars of This Summer	Ichino		
2025	The Deepest Space In Us			
2025	Echoes of Motherhood			

=== TV series ===
Year	Title	Role	Notes	Ref.
2007	When I was a child: Actress Yuki Saito	Rie Saito		
2008	Gakkō ja Oshierarenai!	Hitomi Kenjou		
2008	Bōshi	Setsu Takemoto (14/19-years-old)		
2010	Tomehane! Suzuri Kōkō Shodōbu	Yuki Mochizuki	Leading role	
2010	Teppan	Kana Shinomiya	Asadora	
2011	Gō	Natsu	Taiga drama	
2013	Jun and Ai	Hasumi Miyasato	Asadora	
2015–18	Downtown Rocket	Aki Kanoh	2 seasons	
2017	Naotora: The Lady Warlord	Takase	Taiga drama	
2018–19	Inspector Totsugawa Series	Sakai	Series 5, 6, 7, 8	
2019	La Grande Maison Tokyo	Miyu Ebina		
2019	Rinka, Kabukicho Defence lawyer	Rinka Misuzu	Leading role	
2021	Reach Beyond the Blue Sky	Ayako Okuma	Taiga drama	
2023	The Crimes of Those Women	Yuko Kameyama		
2023	Shall We Have a Toast Anyway?	Akebi Machi		
2024	Dear Radiance	Fujiwara no Seishi	Taiga drama	
2024	La Grande Maison Tokyo Special	Miyu Ebina	Television film	

== Books ==
=== Photo books ===
- Morning Glories (10 Feb 2010, Wani Books, photo by Yuki Nishida) ISBN 978-4-8470-4237-9
