= Masataka Kubota =

Japanese actor (born 1988)

- 窪田 正孝
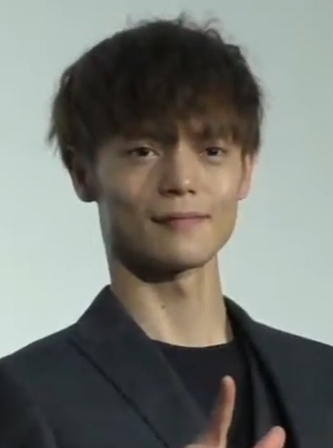
- Kubota at a press event for Tokyo Ghoul S in 2019
- Born: 6 August 1988 (age 38); Kanagawa Prefecture, Japan
- Occupation: Actor
- Years active: 2006–present
- Agent: Stardust Promotion
- Spouse: Asami Mizukawa (m. 2019)
- Website: Official profile (Japanese); Masataka Kubota on Instagram

Masataka Kubota (窪田 正孝, Kubota Masataka; born 6 August 1988) is a Japanese actor.

== History ==
Kubota was born in Kanagawa Prefecture. He is the youngest of three brothers. He hoped to become a vehicle mechanic and enrolled in the mechanical department of Kanagawa Technical Senior High School. While Kubota was still in high school, his mother encouraged him to enter show business. After the audition, Kubota joined entertainment agency Stardust Promotion and became an actor.

In 2006, Kubota was debut starring Fuji Television's late-night television series Chekeraccho! in Tokyo. In the same year, he also made his film debut in Yuki Inomata's film Humoresque. But he often failed auditions until he was 19, and there were times when he thought about giving up acting. However, he was chosen again to be the lead actor in the television series K-tai Investigator 7 in 2008. He says his encounter with director Takashi Miike, who directed the series, was a turning point in his life.

Kubota was then gradually recognised for his acting ability and appeared in several popular Japanese national television series, including NHK Asadora and Taiga drama. In 2012, Kubota appeared in Taiga drama Taira no Kiyomori, he played Taira no Shigemori, the tragic heir to the lead role of Taira no Kiyomori. In 2014, he appeared Asadora Hanako to Anne, he became well known for playing the childhood friend of Hanako, the lead character. He then became a popular actor with appearances in popular television series Testimony of N written by Kanae Minato in 2014 and Death Note in 2015.

Kubota starred in Takashi Miike's 2019 film First Love. The film was selected for the Directors' Fortnight at the 72nd Cannes Film Festival, and Kubota attended the festival with Miike.

In 2020, he was cast as the lead in the first half of the 2020 Asadora Yell. It was the first time since Massan, which aired in the second half of 2014, that a man was the main character in asadora.

In 2021, Kubota won Newcomer of the Year of Elan d'or Awards for his work as an actor the previous year. In 2022, he won the Best Supporting Actor Award at the 46th Japan Academy Film Prize for the film A Man.

== Personal life ==
Kubota and actress Asami Mizukawa's agency jointly announced that the two were engaged. They registered their marriage on 21 September 2019.

== Filmography ==
=== Films ===
- Boku no Hatsukoi o Kimi ni Sasagu (2009)
- Kyōretsu! Mōretsu!! Kodai Shōjo Doguchan Matsuri Special Movie Edition (2010), Makoto Sugihara
- Gachiban Series (2010–2014), Yūto Kuronaga
- 13 Assassins (2010), Shōjirō Kokura
- We Can't Change the World. But, We Wanna Build a School in Cambodia. (2011), Masayuki Yano
- Hasami (2012), Yōhei Hayama
- Rurouni Kenshin (2012), Akira Kiyosato
- The Cowards Who Looked to the Sky (2012), Ryōta Fukuda
- Suzuki Sensei (2013), Yoshio Shirai
- Jellyfish Eyes (2013), Yoninshū Seiryū
- Goddotan Kiss Gaman Senshuken The Movie (2013), Michael
- Tobe Dakota (2013), Kenichi Kimura
- The Liar and His Lover (2013), Shinya Shinohara
- Dakishimetai: Shinjitsu no Monogatari (2014), Junpei
- Yamikin Ushijima-kun Part 2 (2014), Rei Kanzaki
- Naniwa Sendō (2014)
- Eiga ST Aka to Shiro no Sōsa File (2015), Yūji Kurosaki
- April Fools (2015), Matsuda
- Prophecy (2015), Yūichi Aoyama
- Romance (2015), Naoki
- 64: Part I (2016), Kōichirō Hiyoshi
- 64: Part II (2016), Kōichirō Hiyoshi
- Maniac Hero (2016), Makoto Toshida
- Mars (2016)
- Tokyo Ghoul (2017), Ken Kaneki
- The Last Cop (2017), Ryōta Mochizuki
- Thicker Than Water (2018), Kazunari
- Gintama 2 (2018), Bansai Kawakami
- Tokyo Ghoul S (2019), Ken Kaneki
- First Love (2019), Leo
- Diner (2019)
- Fancy (2020)
- Poupelle of Chimney Town (2020), Poupelle (voice)
- The Sunday Runoff (2022), Tanimura
- A Man (2022), Daisuke Taniguchi
- Radiation House: The Movie (2022), Iori Igarashi
- My Broken Mariko (2022), Makio
- Yudo: The Way of the Bath (2023)
- Home Sweet Home (2023), Kenji
- One Last Bloom (2023), Toshio Nakanishi
- Masked Hearts (2023)
- Cloud (2024), Muraoka
- Last Mile (2024), Rokuro Kube
- The Real You (2024), AI voice
- Saint Young Men: The Movie (2024), Mara
- La Grande Maison Paris (2024), Toshihisa Yuasa
- Hero's Island (2025), Rei
- A Bad Summer (2025), Kanemoto
- Chimney Town: Frozen in Time (2026), Poupelle (voice)
- Blue Lock (2026), Jinpachi Ego

=== Television ===
- Chekeraccho!! in Tokyo (2006), Takumi Aoba
- Jikuu Keisatsu Wecker Signa (2007), Ēichi Karasuma
- Mop Girl Episode 7 (2007), Jun
- K-tai Investigator 7 (2008–2009), Keita Amishima
- Naniwa no Hana: Ogata Kōan Jikenchō (2009), Akira Ogata
- Mama wa Mukashi Papa Datta (2009), Shinichirō Kayama(Miwako)
- The Ancient Dogoo Girl (2009), Makoto Sugihara
- Xmas no Kiseki (2009), Ken Hayashida
- Boku ga Celeb to Kekkon Shita Hōhō (2010), Shinnosuke Sawada
- My Husband Is a Cartoonist (2010), Kēichi Kurata
- Joker: Yurusarezaru Sōsakan Episode 4 (2010), Takahiro Shiina
- Koisuru Nihongo (2011), Akira
- Misaki Number One!! Episode 3 (2011), Nakatsu
- Honboshi: Shinri Tokusō Jikenbo Episode 4 (2011), Keita Minobe
- Karyū no Utage (2011), Shō Fukuhara
- Aishiteru: Kaiyō (2011)
- QP (2011), Eiji
- Nazotoki wa Dinner no Atode Episode 4 (2011), Miura
- Shiritsu Bakaleya Koukou (2012), Hakamatsuka
- Legal High Episode 2 (2012), Jango Jango Higashi Kurume
- Taira no Kiyomori (2012), Taira no Shigemori
- Sōmatō Kabushikigaisha Episode 1 (2012), Takahiro Seki
- Honto ni Atta Kowai Hanashi Natsu no Tokubetsu-hen 2012 (2012), Kenta Yamada
- Perfect Blue Episode 1 (2012), Takashi Inami
- Ōoku: Tanjō (Arikoto Iemitsu-hen) (2012), Sutezō
- Saikō no Rikon (2013), Junnosuke Hatsushima
- ST Keishichō Kagaku Sōsahan (2013), Yūji Kurosaki
- Summer Nude (2013), Hikaru Kirihata
- Limit (2013), Wataru Igarashi
- Sabishii Karyūdo (2013), Masato Noro
- Keiji no Manazashi Episodes 10–11 (2013), Shingo Yamanouchi
- Urero Mitaiken Shōjo Episode 5 (2014), Shō Saionji
- Kamen Teacher (2014), Atsushi Amakawa
- Hanako and Anne (2014), Asaichi Kiba
- Asaichi no Yomesan (2014)
- ST Aka to Shiro no Sōsa File (2014), Yūji Kurosaki
- Testimony of N (2014), Shinji Naruse
- Algernon ni Hanataba o (2015), Ryūichi Yanagawa
- The Last Cop (2015), Ryōta Mochizuki
- Eien no Bokura: Sea Side Blue (2015), Kōta Yamauchi
- Death Note (2015), Light Yagami
- High&Low: The Story of S.W.O.R.D. (2015), Smoky
- Rinshō Hanzai Gakusha Himura Hideo no Suiri (2016), Arisu Arisugawa
- Hitoya no Toge (2017), Ryota
- Fugitive Boys (2017), Tobio
- Unnatural (2018), Rokuro Kube
- Radiation House (2019–2021), Iori Igarashi
- Yell (2020), Yūichi Koyama
- Modern Love Tokyo (2022), Rin (voice)
- Hijikata's Smart Phone (2021), Hijikata Toshizo
  - Hijikata's Smart Phone: New Year SP (2022)
- Non-REM Sleep Window 2022, Autumn "The Man from the Future" (2022), Koji Suganuma
- Actor's Short Film 3 "Tiger's Cave" (2023), Leading role
- Outrageous (2023), Okamoto, half awake, half sleeping
- A Classroom in Midair (2024), Kanae Fujitake
- La Grande Maison Tokyo Special (2024), Toshihisa Yuasa
- Shōgun season 2 (TBA), Hyuga

== Awards and nominations ==
Year	Award	Category	Work(s)	Result	Ref.
2012	34th Yokohama Film Festival	Best Newcomer	The Cowards Who Looked to the Sky and Hasami	Won	
2012	27th Takasaki Film Festival	Best Supporting Actor	The Cowards Who Looked to the Sky	Won	
2021	55th Elan d'or Awards	Newcomer of the Year	Himself	Won	
2023	77th Mainichi Film Awards	Best Supporting Actor	A Man	Won	
2023	46th Japan Academy Film Prize	Best Supporting Actor	A Man	Won	
2025	38th Nikkan Sports Film Awards	Best Supporting Actor	Hero's Island	Nominated	
2026	80th Mainichi Film Awards	Best Supporting Performance	Hero's Island	Won	
2026	68th Blue Ribbon Awards	Best Supporting Actor	Hero's Island	Nominated	
