= Onoe Kikugorō VIII =

Japanese kabuki actor (born 1977)

- Born: Kazuyasu Terajima (Note: While the stage names of all kabuki actors have retained traditional order (Surname-Givenname) on Wikipedia, birth names of those born after the Meiji Restoration are in Western order (Givenname-Surname).); August 1, 1977; Tokyo, Japan
- Other names: Onoe Ushinosuke VI, Onoe Kikunosuke V, Otowa-ya
- Spouse: Yoko Namino (m. 2013) (Note: Fourth daughter of Nakamura Kichiemon II.)
- Children: Onoe Kikunosuke VI (eldest son); Tomoyo Terajima (daughter); Arata Terajima (daughter)
- Parents: Onoe Kikugorō VII (father); Sumiko Fuji (mother)
- Relatives: Baikō Onoe VII (grand father); Nakamura Kichiemon II (father-in-law); Shinobu Terajima (elder sister); Onoe Maholo (nephew); Onoe Ukon II (second cousin)

Onoe Kikugorō VIII (八代目 尾上菊五郎, Hachidaime Onoe Kikugorō; born August 1, 1977) is a Japanese Kabuki actor who has also acted in television series and films as actor. He is the eldest son and successor of Onoe Kikugorō VII. He was called the "Prince of the Kabuki world" for his elegant features and his origin from a distinguished family.

He is current the eighth kabuki actor to hold the stage name Onoe Kikugorō and previously was the fifth actor to hold the stage name Onoe Kikunosuke. In the traditional world of kabuki, stage name is succeeded from father to son from generation to generation which converts the kabuki stage name into a mark of accomplishment.

At the special performance held at the Kabuki-za Theatre on April 29, 2025, he formally succeeded to the name Onoe Kikugorō VIII, while his son inherited his father's former stage name, becoming Onoe Kikunosuke VI. A traditional "Koshiki-Kaoyose Teuchi-shiki (古式顔寄せ手打式)" ceremony was also conducted to pray for the success of the upcoming series of name-succession performances beginning the following month. His father, Onoe Kikugorō VII, a Living National Treasure, would continue to use the same stage name. This marks the first time in history that two actors will simultaneously bear the name Kikugorō.

== Lineage ==
He is a third-generation Kabuki actor and comes from a renowned Kabuki acting family: his father, Onoe Kikugorō VII (七代目 尾上菊五郎) is one of the greatest Kabuki actors of the Showa and Heisei eras and is known for his versatility with both male (Tachiyaku) and female roles (Onnagata) and his grandfather, Onoe Baikō VII (七代目 尾上梅幸) was known for being one of the greatest onnagata actors of the 20th century and who was considered an artistic rival to another famous kabuki actor who was also famous for onnagata roles, Nakamura Utaemon VI.

Kikugorō VIII is a second cousin of Onoe Ukon II (二代目 尾上右近), a rising Kabuki actor who is the grandson and direct descendant of the legendary Kabuki actor Onoe Kikugorō VI (六代目 尾上菊五郎), one of the greatest Kabuki actors of the Meiji and Showa eras and the adoptive father of Onoe Baikō VII, Kikugorō VIII's grandfather.

Kikugorō VIII's father-in-law, Nakamura Kichiemon II (二代目 中村吉右衛門), was one of the greatest Tachiyaku actors of the Showa and Heisei eras, known for his outstanding portrayal of tachiyaku roles such as Benkei from Kanjinchō, Taira no Tomomori from Yoshitsune Senbon Zakura and Matsuōmaru from Sugawara Denju Tenarai Kagami, which earned him the title of Living National Treasure in July 2011

His eldest son, Onoe Kikunosuke VI (六代目 尾上菊之助) is son of Kikugorō VIII and Yoko Namino (daughter of Kichiemon II), grandson of Kikugorō VII and Kichiemon II, great-grandson of Baikō VII and Matsumoto Hakuō I (father of Kichiemon II), great-great-grandson of Matsumoto Kōshirō VII and Nakamura Kichiemon I (both grandfathers of Kichiemon II), great-great-great-grandson of Nakamura Karoku III (great-grandfather of Kichiemon II) and great-great-great-great-grandson of Nakamura Karoku I (great-great-grandfather of Kichiemon II), as well as being the cousin of Onoe Maholo and third cousin of Onoe Ukon II.

His nephew, Onoe Maholo (尾上眞秀) is the son of Shinobu Terajima (Kikugorō VIII's older sister), cousin of Ushinosuke VII (Kikugorō VIII's eldest son), grandson of Kikugorō VII, and great-grandson of Baikō VII.

As is tradition in Kabuki, Kikunosuke announced that in 2025 he will take the name Onoe Kikugorō VIII (八代目 尾上菊五郎), while his son Ushinosuke VII will become Onoe Kikunosuke VI (六代目 尾上菊之助) and that he will be the next head of the Otowaya acting house in the future.

== Career ==
Kikunosuke was born the eldest son of Onoe Kikugoro VII in 1977. He was mentored by his father and grandfather from an early age and trained in Kabuki as their successor. He made his stage debut in February 1984 under the name Onoe Ushinosuke VI in Ushiwakamaru in The picture book Ushiwakamaru, and succeeded the name Onoe Kikunosuke V in May 1996 in roles such as Benten Kozō Kikunosuke in Benten Musume Meo no Shiranami.

He carries on the tradition of Otowaya, (Note: Otowaya is one of the Yagō of a Kabuki actor. Onoe Kikugoro I, who was active in the 18th century (Edo period) both as an onnagata and tachiyaku, was born near Kiyomizu-dera in Kyoto and took the name Otowaya Hanpei, after the Otowa spring on the grounds of Kiyomizu-dera. After Onoe Kikugoro I, the tradition of Otowaya has been inherited from generation to generation, with the name being succeeded on to his sons and apprentices. Otowaya is one of the most famous Yagō representing Edo Kabuki, and is known as "Dangiku" along with Ichikawa Danjūrō's Yagō Naritaya.) which his family has carried on from generation to generation, in which he has been acting both an onnagata (actor playing female role) and tachiyaku (actor playing the leading male role). He has been performing onnagata since he was a teenager, and Shirabyoshi Hanako in Kyōganoko Musume Dōjōji, is known as one of his best-known works considered the pinnacle of onnagata role, in which he is known for his ability to masterfully perform the emotional changes of a woman who has fallen in love.

In 2000, he played Murasaki no Ue in the Kabuki production of The Tale of Genji and received favorable reviews along with other young kabuki actors such as Ichikawa Shinnosuke VII (current Ichikawa Danjūrō XIII) as Hikaru Genji and Onoe Tatsunosuke II (current Onoe Shoroku IV) as Tō No Chūjō, and became popular among the masses as "the Sannosuke of Heisei era." (Note: "San-no-suke" means three men with "suke" in their names.) Their fathers had been popular in the 1960s and were called "the original Sannosuke."

In addition to performing in classical Kabuki, he is also passionate about producing new Kabuki productions such as Twelfth Night of Ninagawa, a work based on Twelfth Night, The War Chronicles of the Mahabharata a work based on the Indian mythological epic Mahabharata, and Nausicaä of the Valley of the Wind, a work based on Hayao Miyazaki manga series.

His major appearances in TV series include Onihei Hankachō The Final and La Grande Maison Tokyo, Taiga drama Aoi and Segodon.

In 2005, he was recognized by Agency for Cultural Affairs as an Important Intangible Cultural Property as Kabuki actor.

On April 13, 2025, he appeared alongside Hayato Nakamura and Kangyoku Nakamura in a program titled "Festival" at the opening ceremony of Expo 2025 in Osaka, where they performed Renjishi.

On April 29 of the same year, he succeeded his father’s stage name and became Onoe Kikugorō VIII.

== New Kabuki Productions ==
=== Ninagawa Twelfth Night ===
In 2005, Ninagawa Twelfth Night, based on William Shakespeare's play and directed by Yukio Ninagawa, was performed at the Kabuki-za. Kikunosuke commissioned the stage director Yukio Ninagawa to produce a Kabuki adaptation of Twelfth Night for years. Ninagawa had never directed a Kabuki play before and had never considered producing one, but he was moved by Kikunosuke's enthusiasm and accepted the production. Kikunosuke had appeared in Ninagawa's stage production of The Greeks in 2000. Since then he had asked Ninagawa to direct Kabuki many times. Kikunosuke explained why he chose Twelfth Night by saying, "I chose Twelfth Night because it's a Shakespeare play with a history about as long as Kabuki's that also contains comedy, which I can do." In the Kabuki adaptation, all the characters' names were changed to Japanese names. Kikunosuke played the dual roles of the male and female twins Biwahime (Viola) and Shiba-shuzennosuke (Sebastian). His father Kikugoro VII played the dual roles of Maruobodayu (Malvolio) and Sutesuke (Feste). The play was so well received that it was performed again at the Kabuki-za in 2007, and then at the Barbican Centre in London in March 2009. The London audience applauded the vividly eye-catching setting of cherry blossoms in full bloom and a colony of lilies on a moon bridge, as well as Kikunosuke's rapid costume changes, which led to a standing ovation at the curtain call. Theater critic Philip Fisher, in The British Theatre Guide criticized that Ninagawa had committed the heresy of having the play re-written with Shakespeare's plays, but praised the beauty of the stage settings and costumes, and complimented Kikugoro's masterful performance and Kikunosuke's expressiveness in playing the roles of Viola as a woman and Sebastian as a man.

=== The War Chronicles of the Mahabharata ===
Kikunosuke also adapted the Indian ancient mythological epic Mahabharata into a Kabuki production. This is the first time in history that an Indian classic performed as a Kabuki play, and was staged in October to commemorate the "Japan-India Friendship Exchange Year" in 2017, which is also the 60th anniversary of the entry into force of The Cultural Agreement Between Japan and India. He conceived, wrote, choreographed, and starred in this work. The idea for this piece began when he saw SPAC's (Shizuoka Performing Arts Center) Mahabharata Naracharitam, which was performed to rave reviews at Festival d'Avignon in 2014, and wanted to turn it into a Kabuki play. He then asked SPAC's artistic director, Satoshi Miyazaki, to direct the production, and asked Go Aoki to write the script, which was original and newly created from scratch. According to Miyagi, the SPAC version of the Mahabharata was staged in the parts of the long original work that did not depict battles, but since Kabuki has traditionally featured many subjects of warfare, he decided to make the work centered on battles, making it a counterpart to SPAC's play. It is a story of a battle between two opposing royal families and the gods who watch over them from above and sometimes change their appearance to engage with human beings. Kikunosuke played the two roles of the main characters, Karna and Shiva. Karuna is a hero who contributes to the losing royal family. In kabuki, unfortunate heroes are often portrayed as the protagonists. The Indian gods appearing in the play are dressed in gorgeous golden costumes, inspired by traditional Indian Kathakali dance and while the stylistic beauty of kabuki is utilized, percussion is added to traditional nagauta for the music, resulting in a work that harmonizes tradition and innovation. Prior to the performance, Kikunosuke visited India and visited a Hindu temple to feel the mythical world of the Mahabharata, and saw murals and statues of Shiva. The play was nearly four hours long, and was well received. In 2023, Kikugoro's son Ushinosuke joined the cast for a second performance, bringing together three generations of Kikugoro and Kikunosuke.

=== Nausicaa of the Valley of the Wind ===
In 2019, Hayao Miyazaki's manga series Nausicaä of the Valley of the Wind was adapted into a Kabuki play. Kikunosuke, who is fond of works of Studio Ghibli, said that he had asked Studio Ghibli for a Kabuki adaptation five years prior to the production. Kikunosuke chose Nausicaa because he said that classical kabuki plays have "universality" in their content, and that Nausicaa also has "universality" in its theme, and that he wished to depict energy resource problems and environmental issues through Nausicaa, which had not been depicted in kabuki before. He also said that he was attracted to the character of Nausicaa because of the strength and loveliness of the woman Nausicaa. He also said that he hoped to produce something that would appeal to people overseas about Japanese culture in preparation for the 2020 Summer Olympics to be held in Tokyo. Producer Toshio Suzuki of Studio Ghibli said that Nausicaa is the most important work for Hayao Miyazaki, and that he has turned down all offers to adapt Nausicaa for live-action Hollywood. Suzuki explained that he had thought that Miyazaki would probably turn down the idea of a Kabuki adaptation, but for some reason, he said he would do it this time. Miyazaki's two conditions for the Kabuki adaptation were that the title Nausicaa of the Valley of the Wind not be changed and that it would be good if Suzuki would do the promotional activities. Kikunosuke and Miyazaki communicate with each other through Suzuki. The music was also rearranged from Joe Hisaishi's music and performed with Japanese instruments. Kikunosuke played Nausicaä and Nakamura Shichinosuke II played Kushana in this production. This production was staged at the Shinbashi Enbujo in December 2019. The unprecedented attempt to depict the world of the epic story in the original seven-volume manga by presenting it as a new Kabuki play with a daytime and evening performance, created a great sensation upon its announcement. Tickets for the performance were difficult to obtain, so in February and March of the following year, both the first and second parts were screened in movie theaters nationwide for a limited period of one week each. In July 2022, the cast was changed. Kikunosuke played the role of Kushana, and Nakamura Yonekichi V, who played Kecak in previous performance, played Nausicaa, and the play was performed again at the Kabuki-za after two and a half years.

== Personal life ==
In February 2013 it was announced that he married with Yoko Namino, daughter of Nakamura Kichiemon II. In November of the same year, his eldest son was born. His first daughter was born in 2015 and his second daughter in 2017. His family is also known as a show business family. His mother is the movie actress Sumiko Fuji, with whom he co-starred in the movie The Inugamis, in which they played the role of Sukekiyo Inugami and his mother in 2006. His elder sister Shinobu Terajima is also an actress.

== Awards ==
- Special Prize of National Theatre of Japan - Shoka Kikanbo in Kyōganoko Musume Dōjōji (1985)
- Special Prize of National Theatre of Japan - Chiyomatsu in Jitsuroku Sendai Hagi (1987)
- Kabuki-za Award (1992)
- Incentive Award of National Theatre of Japan - Daughter Ohisa in Ninjo Banashi Bunshichi Mottoi (1993)
- Asakusa Performing Arts Award, Newcomer of the Year Award, Encouragement Award the Thirteen Nights Club (1996)
- Shochiku Chairman's Award - Ashikaga Naoyoshi in Kanadehon Chūshingura (1998)
- Shochiku Chairman's Award - Shunkyo Kagamijishi (1999)
- Shochiku Chairman's Award - Benten Kozō Kikunosuke in Benten Musume Meo no Shiranami (2000)
- 24th Matsuo Performing Arts Award, Newcomer of the Year (2003)
- Yomiuri Theatre Grand Prize, Haruko Sugimura Award - Kyōganoko Musume Dōjōji, Jiraiya goketsu monogatari, Sukeroku Yuren Edo Sakura, etc. (2005)
- Asahi Performing Arts Award, Shūji Terayama Award - Twelfth Night of Ninagawa and other activities to expand the possibilities of Kabuki (2005)
- Recognized as an Important Intangible Cultural Property (general recognition) and became a member of the Society for the Preservation of Traditional Kabuki (2005)
- Art Encouragement Prize for New Artists (2005)
- Yomiuri Theatre Grand Prize for Outstanding Actor - Sesshu Gappo ga Tsuji (2011)
- 44th Matsuo Performing Arts Award for Excellence (2023)
- 73rd Minister of Education, Culture, Sports, Science and Technology Award for Art Encouragement (Theatre Division) (2023)

== Major Appearances ==
=== Kabuki ===
==== Classical Kabuki ====
- Benten Kozō (1996 -) as Benten Kozô Kikunosuke
- Shunkyo Kagami Jishi (1996 -) as Yayoi
- Kyōganoko Musume Dōjōji (1999 -) as Shirabyōshi Hanako
- Sukeroku Yukari no Edozakura (2004 -) as Agemaki
- Meiboku Sendai Hagi (2008 -) - as Masaoka
- Sesshu Gappo Ga Tsuji (2010 -) as Tamate Gozen

==== New Kabuki ====
- Twelfth Night of Ninagawa (2005) - as Shibanushi Zennosuke / Shishimaru as Biwa-hime (2 roles)
- The War Chronicles of the Mahabharata (2017 -) - as Kaluna / Shiva
- Nausicaä of the Valley of the Wind (2022) - as Nausicaä
- Final Fantasy X (2023) - as Tida

=== Other stage productions ===
- Lyle (1990) - as Josh
- The Greeks (2000) - as Orestes
- Hayate no Gotoku (2002) - as Kotaro Hino
- Vincent in Brixton (2003) - as Vincent van Gogh
- My soul is shining water (2008) - as Goro Saito

=== Films ===
- Samurai Kids (1993) - as Issun-bōshi
- 47 Ronin (1994) - as Chikara Oishi
- The Inugamis (2006) -as Sukekiyo Inugami
- Cinema Kabuki Hidakagawa irisoukaou (2006) - as Ningyo-chan
- Cinema Kabuki Kyokanoko Musume Ninin Dojoji (2007) - as Hanako Shiraibyoshi
- Kaidan (2007) - as Shinkichi
- The Chronicles of Narnia: Prince Caspian (2008) - Dubbing as Prince Caspian
- The Chronicles of Narnia: The Voyage of the Dawn Treader (2011) - dubbed as Prince Caspian

=== TV Series ===
- Taiga drama (NHK)
  - Aoi (2000) - Toyotomi Hideyori
  - Segodon (2018) - Gessho
- Clouds Over the Hill (2009 - 2011) - Emperor Meiji
- Onihei Hankachō The Final (2016) - Torataro Ishidou
- The Witch of Origami and Dr. Shikaku Jikan (2017) - The Witch of Origami (voice)
- Shitamachi Rocket 2 (2018) - Dai Itami
  - Shitamachi Rocket Special Edition (2019)
- La Grande Maison Tokyo (2019) - Manabu Tango
  - La Grande Maison Tokyo Special (2024)
- Detective After 5 (2020) - Starring Wataru Hirohashi
- Come Come Everybody (2021) - as Kennosuke Momoyama and Dangoro Momoyama (two roles each)
- Appliance Samurai Special Stop! Chushingura (2023) - Yoshio Oishi Kuranosuke
- Detective Romance (2023) - Sumeragi Heikichi
