= Ikki Sawamura =

Japanese actor (born 1967)

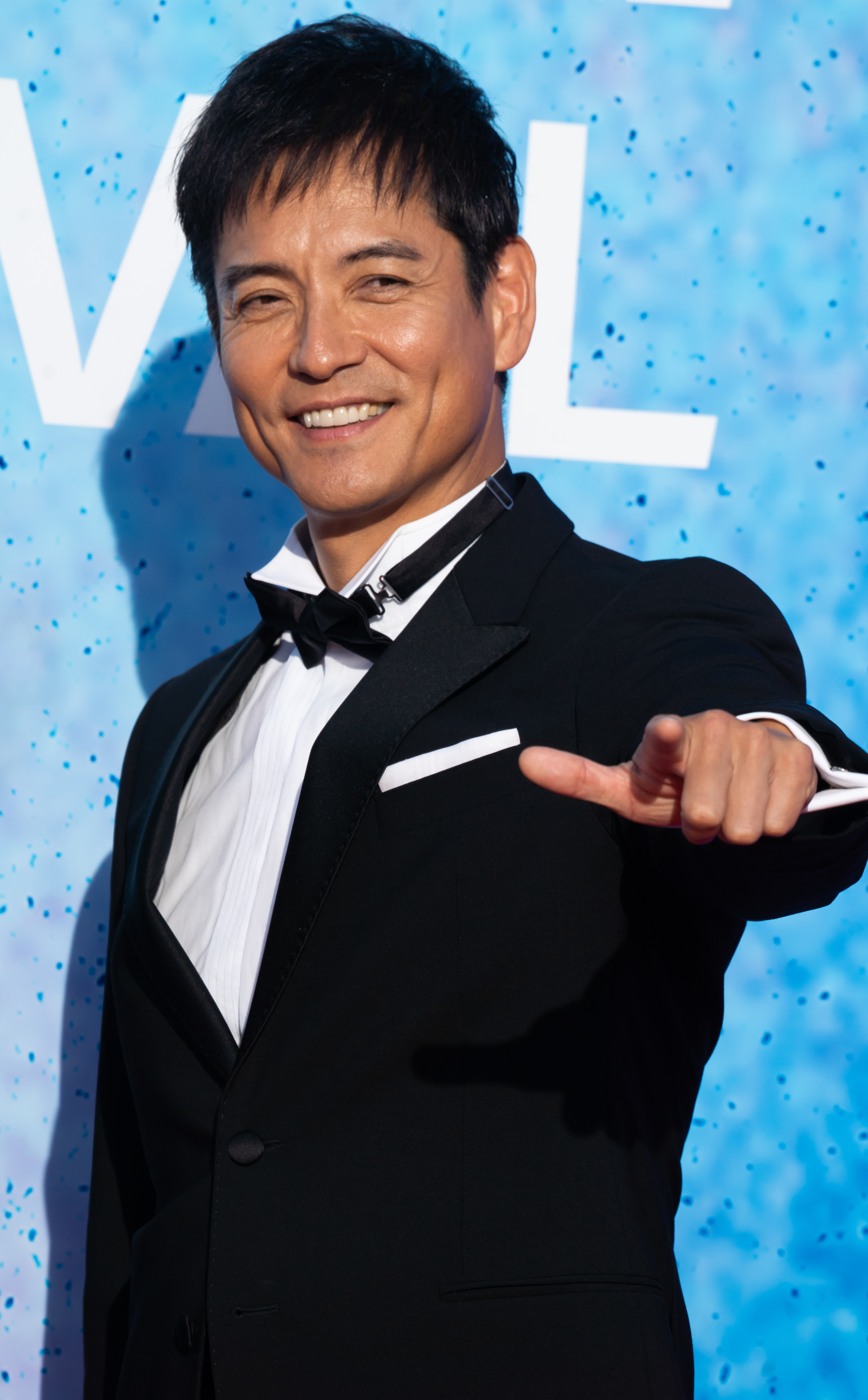
- Sawamura at the Yokohama International Film Festival in May 2023
- Born: Kōzo Nomura (野村 耕蔵); July 10, 1967 (age 59); Kagoshima, Kagoshima Prefecture, Japan
- Occupation: Actor
- Years active: 1996–present
- Agent: Ken-On
- Height: 1.84 m (6 ft 0 in)
- Spouse: Unknown (m. 2000)
- Children: 3, including Kouta

Kōzo Nomura (野村 耕蔵, Nomura Kōzo; born July 10, 1967), known professionally as Ikki Sawamura (沢村 一樹), is a Japanese model, film and television actor, and television presenter signed to Ken-On.

== Early life ==
Kōzo Nomura was born in Kagoshima City, Kagoshima Prefecture, in 1967, as the eldest of two siblings. He grew up impoverished, with his family living in an old apartment with two rooms, with one room in 6 tatami mats (approximately 106 square feet) in size and the other in 4.5 tatami mats (approximately 80 square feet) without a bathroom. When he was twelve years old, Sawamura's father suddenly disappeared without notice as to why. Days later, debt collectors showed up at their apartment to inform them that his father had accrued a substantial amount of debt, presumably from gambling. To pay off those debts, his mother worked at a snack bar at night and in cosmetics sales during the day to raise him and his younger sister. His parents remained legally married until their divorce when he was in junior high school, although his father now occasionally visited their home. During that time, while they were in contact with their father again, Sawamura got into a heated argument with his father due to the belittling of his mother, which led to a physical altercation. After that confrontation, he and his father became estranged again.

After graduating from the local high school, he decided he wanted to become an actor and to enter the entertainment industry. He figured nothing would happen if he stayed in Kagoshima, so Sawamura decided to move to Tokyo. With the encouragement of his mother, he moved to Tokyo to pursue a career in acting. His father died when he was 19 years old. At the age of 20, he flew from Kagoshima to Tokyo with just ¥190,000 in hand from his savings at his part-time job in his hometown. When he finally got an offer, he worked as a fashion model with the aim of becoming an actor. Later on in his career, Sawamura revealed that he was unable to contact the friend who had promised to accommodate him while in Tokyo, and ended up sleeping in a park on his first day there.

== Career ==
In 1996, Sawamura debuted in a TV drama Matsuda no Drama as an actor. Since then, he has appeared in many television dramas and commercials.

In public and some variety shows, Sawamura often portrays his character as a sexually perverted personality. He is also a well-known fan of Bruce Lee. His hobbies are playing tennis, playing billiards and watching movies.

== Personal life ==
In 2000, Sawamura married a former model who is five years his junior. The couple has three sons. Their eldest son is a model, Taiki Nomura, and their second son is actor Kouta Nomura, his agency announced the birth of their third child, born on April 18, 2010.

== Filmography ==
=== Movies ===
- Kamen Rider Ghost: The 100 Eyecons and Ghost's Fated Moment (2016)
- Love and the Grand Tug-of-war (2021)
- Masquerade Night (2021)
- Detective Conan: Black Iron Submarine (2023), Yōsuke Makino (voice)
- La Grande Maison Paris (2024), Rikutaro Kyono
- One Liter of Tears (2027), Michio Ikeuchi

=== TV dramas ===
- Gokusen (2002), Tomoya Shinohara
- The Great White Tower (2003), Professor Kikukawa
- La Grande Maison Tokyo (2019), Rikutaro Kyono
- The Files of Young Kindaichi (2022), Isamu Kenmochi
- The Tiger and Her Wings (2024), Yoriyasu Kudō
- Superstar Minami Is My Boyfriend!? (2024), Haruyuki
- La Grande Maison Tokyo Special (2024), Rikutaro Kyono
- 1972: Nagisa no Keika (2025), Chōyū Kabira
- Passing the Reins (2025), Yoshihiro Shiina

=== Video games ===
- Yakuza 4 (2010), Hiroaki Arai

=== Japanese dub ===
- Journey to the Center of the Earth (2008), Prof. Trevor Anderson (Brendan Fraser)

== Other works ==
=== TV shows ===
- Ururun Taizaiki in Germany (September, 1998)
- Ururun Taizaiki in China (April, 2001)
- NEO - Office Chuckles - main cast (2005-ongoing)
- Ai no Muchi - presenter (October–December, 2006)
- The Future Professor Sawamura - presenter (October, 2007-April, 2008)
- The Future Professor Sawamura Z - presenter (April, 2008-ongoing)
- ITSUZAI - presenter (October, 2007-ongoing)
- Tokyo-Kawaii TV - host (April, 2008-ongoing)
- 'Downtown no Gaki no Tsukai ya Arahende!!- cameo in No-Laughing Spy Batsu game(December 2011)
