= Kyōka Suzuki =

Japanese actress (born 1968)

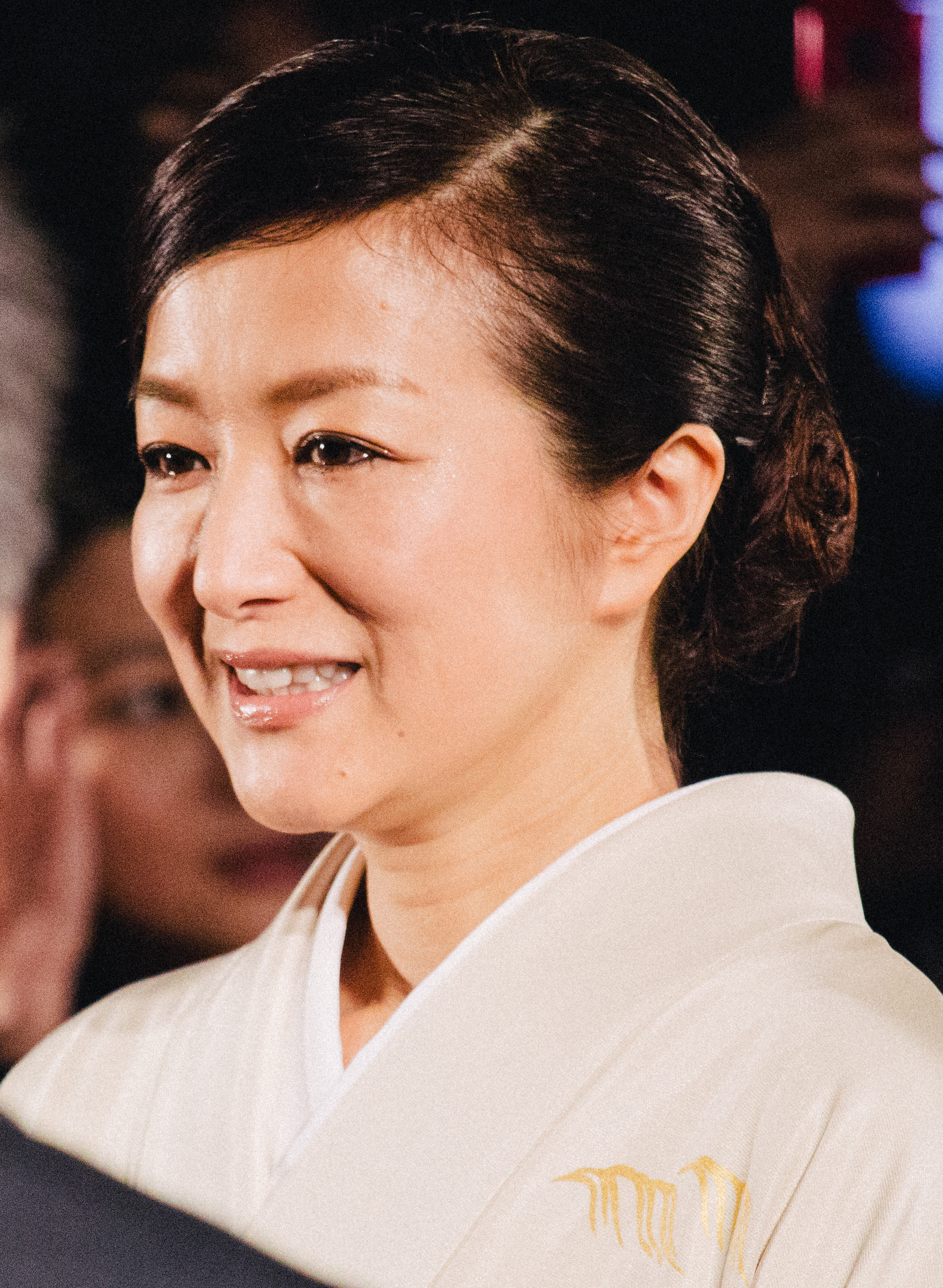
- Born: May 31, 1968 (age 58); Sendai, Miyagi Prefecture, Japan
- Occupation: Actress
- Years active: 1989–present

Kyōka Suzuki (Japanese: 鈴木 京香, Hepburn: Suzuki Kyōka; born May 31, 1968) is a Japanese actress.

== Life and career ==
Suzuki appeared in Shinji Aoyama's Mike Yokohama: A Forest with No Name and Yōichi Sai's Blood and Bones.

She won the Best Actress award at the 1998 Yokohama Film Festival for her role in Welcome Back, Mr. McDonald, at the 42nd Blue Ribbon Awards for Keiho and at the 2011 Tokyo Drama Awards for Second Virgin. On June 9, 2023, she was sent for emergency hospitalization for surgery due to physical discomfort.

== Filmography ==
=== Film ===
Year	Title	Role	Notes	Ref.
1989	Godzilla vs. Biollante	Hiromi Kawai		
1989	Ai to Heisei no Iro Otoko			
1990	Bakayarō! 3: Hen na Yatsura		Anthology film	
1992	Future Memories: Last Christmas	Hikaru Shimayama		
1993	Kaettekita Kogarashi Monjirō	Otami		
1994	119			
1995	Emergency Call			
1996	Shin Izakaya Yūrei			
1997	Welcome Back, Mr. McDonald	Miyako Suzuki		
1998	Bullet Ballet			
1998	Belle Époque			
1999	Keiho		Lead role	
2000	Zawazawa Shimokitazawa			
2001	Transparent: Tribute to a Sad Genius			
2001	Vengeance for Sale			
2002	Ghiblies: Episode 2	Yukari-san (voice)		
2002	Tsuribaka Nisshi 13: Hama-chan Kiki Ippatsu!			
2002	Ryoma's Wife, Her Husband and Her Lover	Narasaki Ryō		
2002	Suite de Jeudi	Eriko Shiotani	Lead role	
2003	Rockers			
2004	Zebraman			
2004	Blood and Bones			
2005	Yamato	Makiko Uchida		
2005	Samurai Commando: Mission 1549			
2006	Udon			
2006	A Cheerful Gang Turns the Earth	Yukiko		
2006	Playboy Don't Cry			
2007	Argentine Baba			
2008	The Magic Hour	Sayoko		
2008	Samurai Gangsters			
2009	Sideways			
2009	Boku to Mama no Kiiroi Jitensha			
2009	The Unbroken	Ritsuko Onchi		
2009	Gravity's Clowns	Rieko Okuno		
2010	Flowers			
2011	A Liar and a Broken Girl	Koibi Sakashita		
2011	Second Virgin	Rui Nakamura	Lead role	
2013	The Kiyosu Conference	Oichi		
2014	Judge!			
2014	Until the Day Comes	Takako Kawashima	Lead role	
2015	Mother's Trees	Mitsu Tamura	Lead role	
2016	Something Like, Something Like It			
2018	Eating Women			
2021	A Garden of Camellias			
2024	La Grande Maison Paris	Rinko Hayami		
2025	One Last Throw	Manami Yokota		
2026	Bye Bye Love: Detective Is in the Bar			
2026	Echoes of Kiriko	Kiriko Harada	Lead role	

=== Television ===
Year	Title	Role	Notes	Ref.
1990	Tobu ga Gotoku	Princess Kazu	Taiga drama	
1991–92	Kimi no Na wa	Machiko Ujiie	Lead role; Asadora	
1995	King's Restaurant	Masako Sanjō		
1996	Only You: Aisarete	Chihiro Mashiba	Lead role	
1998	Kirakira Hikaru			
2000	Aikotoba wa Yūki			
2000	Aoi	Hosokawa Gracia	Taiga drama	
2002	Mike Yokohama: A Forest with No Name		Television film	
2003	Say Hello to Black Jack	Kaori Akagi		
2004	Shinsengumi!	Oume	Taiga drama	
2007	The Family	Aiko Takasu		
2008	Scandal		Lead role	
2010	Second Virgin		Lead role	
2012	Perfect Son	Umi Suzuki	Lead role	
2013	Midnight Ferris Wheel	Mayumi Endō	Lead role	
2016	Sanada Maru	Nei	Taiga drama	
2017	Warotenka	Tsueko Kitamura	Asadora	
2019	La Grande Maison Tokyo	Rinko Hayami		
2021	Welcome Home, Monet	Ayako Nagaura	Asadora	
2022	The 13 Lords of the Shogun	Tango no Tsubone	Taiga drama	
2023	Burn the House Down	Makiko Mitarai		
2024	La Grande Maison Tokyo Special	Rinko Hayami	Television film	
2027	The Shogunate Rebel	Kuni	Taiga drama	

== Honours ==
- Kinuyo Tanaka Award (2014)
