= Kanichiro (actor) =

Japanese actor (born 1996)

- 寛一郎
- Born: Kanichiro Satō; August 16, 1996 (age 30); Setagaya, Tokyo, Japan
- Occupation: Actor
- Years active: 2017–present
- Relatives: Kōichi Satō (father); Rentarō Mikuni (grandfather)
- Website: humanité official web

Kanichiro (Japanese: 寛一郎, Hepburn: Kan'ichirō; born August 16, 1996) is a Japanese actor. He is the son of actor Kōichi Satō and also grandchild of actor Rentarō Mikuni.

== Biography ==
His father is actor Kōichi Satō, and his father often took him to filming locations since he was a child. On the set of TV series Pride in 2004, He said that he remembers Takuya Kimura, the lead actor, playing with him when he was a child. Feeling that those around him expected him to be an actor in the future as a matter of course, he began to deny becoming one during his adolescent years. However, by the time he turned 18, he said he had made up his mind to live as an actor himself. When he was selected to appear in the television series La Grande Maison Tokyo in 2019, he responded to being told that he was riding on his father's coattails, "I became an actor after I was prepared to be told such things." He said he chose Kanichiro by removing his family name Satō from his stage name because of his father's image and he wanted to challenge himself as an actor, independent of his father.

In 2017, he made his acting debut in Miracles of the Namiya General Store, a film directed by Ryūichi Hiroki based on Keigo Higashino's novel of the same name. He won the Best New Actor Award at the 27th Japanese Movie Critics Awards. In this film, he co-starred with Toshiyuki Nishida, who is closely related to his grandfather Rentarō Mikuni from the Tsuribaka nisshi series. The following year's The Chrysanthemum and the Guillotine, a film directed by Takahisa Zeze earned him the 92nd Kinema Junpo Best Ten New Actor Award and the Best Up-and-Coming Actor Award at the 33rd Takasaki Film Festival. His major film credits include Taiga drama The 13 Lords of the Shogun and Kubi, a film directed by Takeshi Kitano.

His first TV series appearance was in 2018 in Midnight Journal: Hunt for the Missing Kidnapper! The Truth of the Seventh Year and his first starring role in a film was Running Again in 2019.

== Filmography ==
=== Film ===
Year	Title	Role	Notes	Ref.
2017	The Anthem of the Heart	Taiki Tazaki		
2017	Miracles of the Namiya General Store	Kohei		
2018	The Chrysanthemum and the Guillotine	Daijiro Furuta		
2020	Theatre: A Love Story	Nohara		
2022	Phases of the Moon	Nakanishi		
2023	Kubi	Mori Ranmaru		
2023	Okiku and the World	Chuji		
2024	Don't Lose Your Head!	Shimizu Ichigaku		
2024	Promised Land	Reijiro	Lead role	
2024	Desert of Namibia	Honda		
2024	Sisam	Kojiro	Lead role	
2024	La Grande Maison Paris	Koichi Serita		
2025	Suzuki=Bakudan	Ise		
2025	The Deepest Space in Us	Takeru	Lead role	
2025	Echoes of Motherhood	Toshizo Noguchi		
2025	The Last Man: The Movie – First Love	Glenn Araki		
2026	Yakushima's Illusion	Jin		
2026	Sheep in the Box	Gen Hidaka		
2027	Hara o Kukutte			

=== Television ===
Year	Title	Role	Notes	Ref.
2019	La Grande Maison Tokyo	Koichi Serita		
2022	The 13 Lords of the Shogun	Kugyō	Taiga drama	
2024	La Grande Maison Tokyo Special	Koichi Serita		
2025	Unbound	Tomimoto Umanosuke II	Taiga drama	
2025	The Ghost Writer's Wife	Ginjiro Yamane	Asadora	
2027	The Shogunate Rebel	Takasugi Shinsaku	Taiga drama	
