= Quintessence (restaurant) =

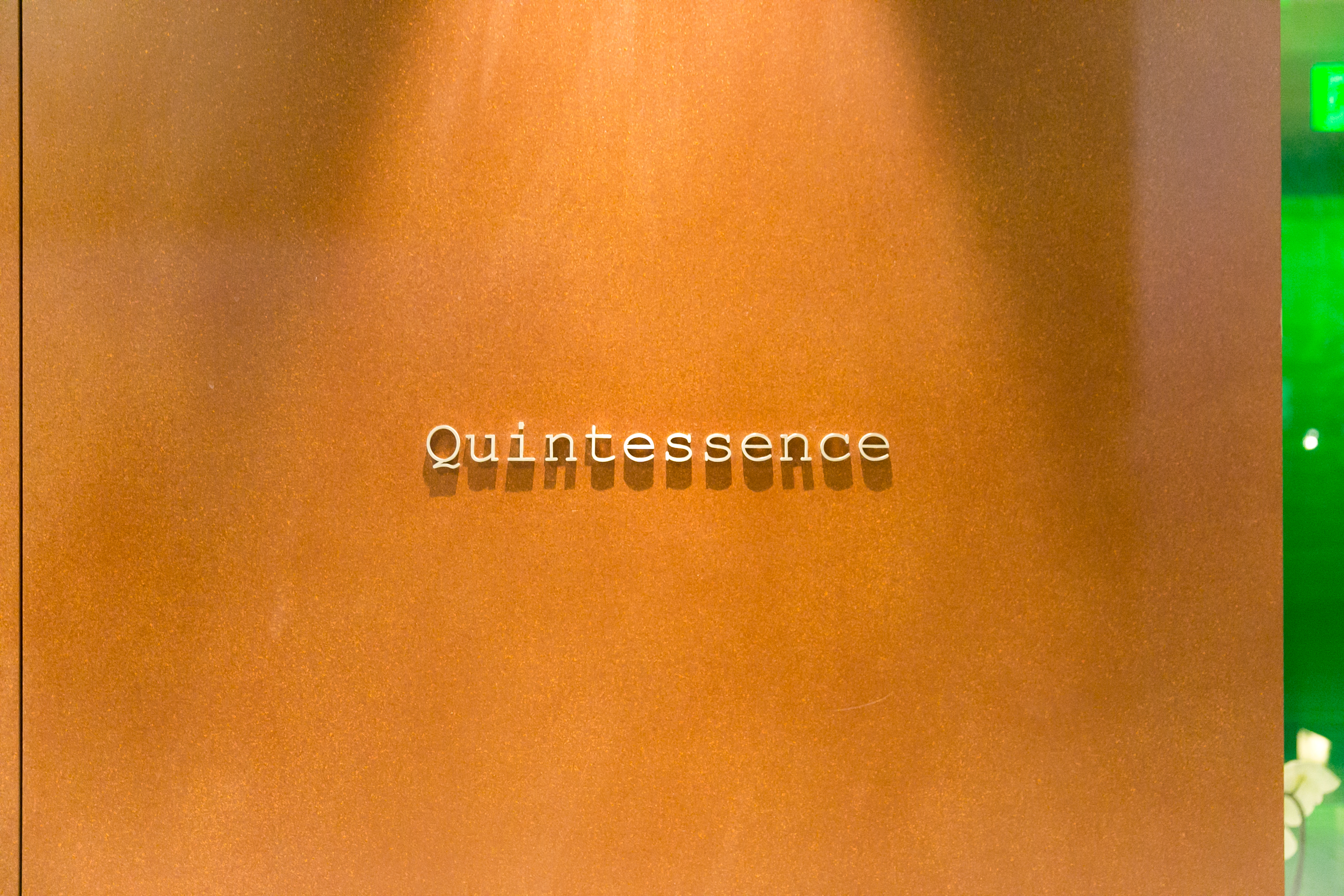
- Exterior sign
- Interactive map of Quintessence

Restaurant information
- Established: 2006
- Head chef: Shuzo Kishida
- Food type: French
- Rating: (Michelin Guide)
- Location: 6-7-29 Garden City Shinagawa Gotenyama 1F, Shinagawa-Ku Kitashinagawa, Shinagawa, 141-0001, Japan
- Coordinates: 35.624097°N 139.733019°E
- Reservations: Required
- Website: www.quintessence.jp

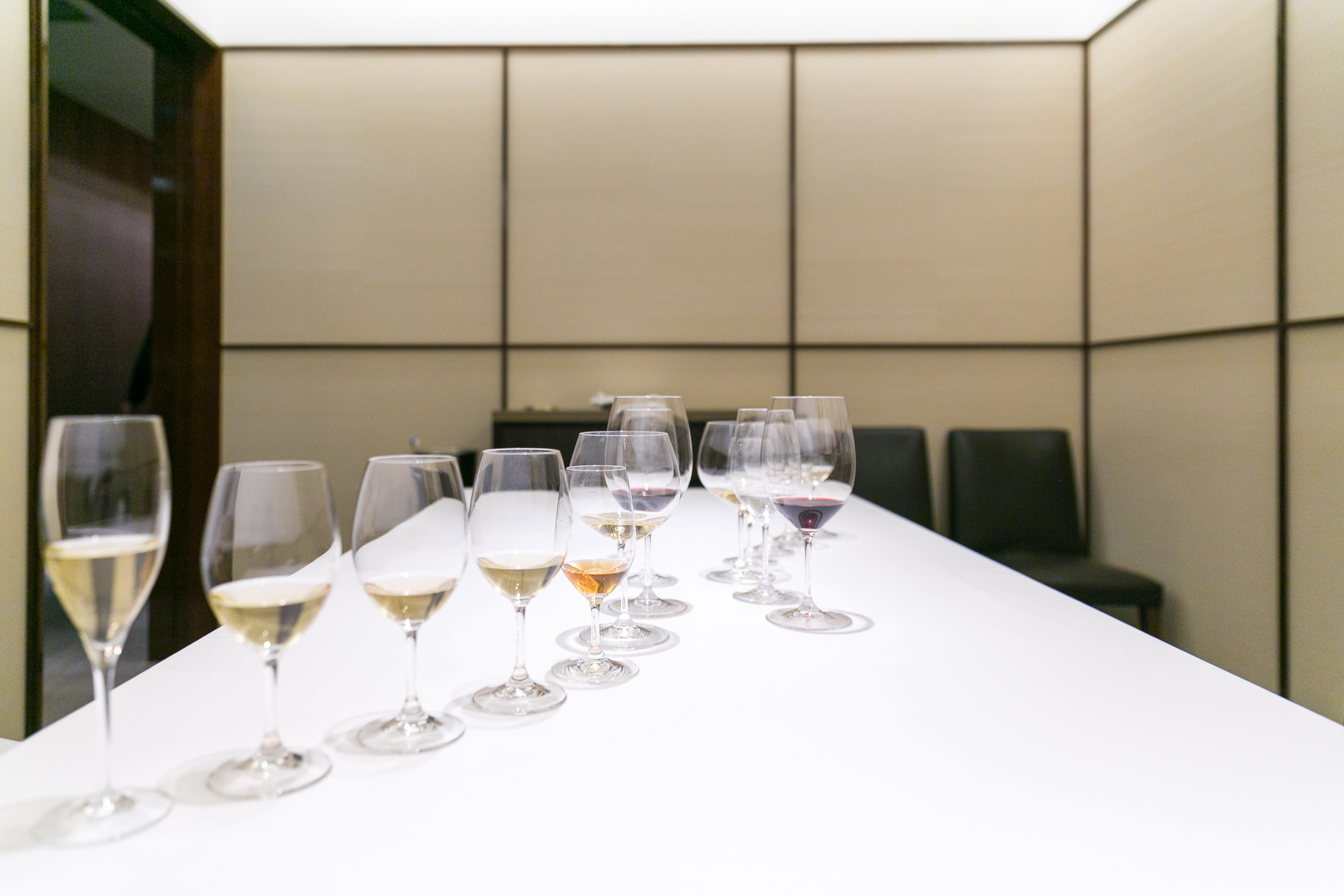
Interior of dining room

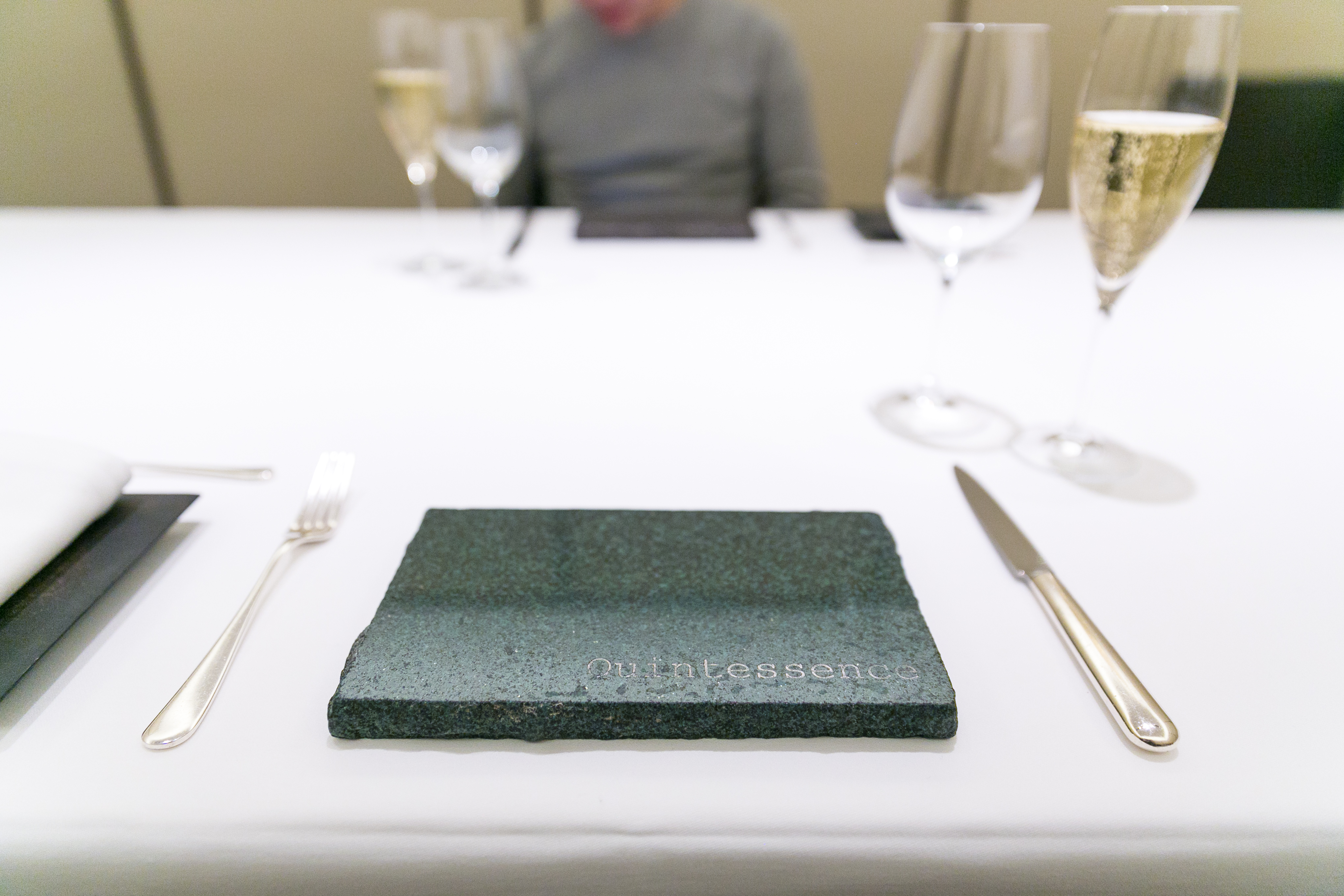
Table setting

Quintessence is a Michelin 3-star Japanese French fusion restaurant in Shinagawa, Japan. It is difficult to reserve a table in the restaurant and has been listed as among the 50 best restaurants in Asia by CNN.

The head chef is Shuzo Kishida from Aichi Prefecture. Kishida worked for L'Astrance in Paris and studied French culinary arts.

In 2019, food from Quintessence was featured in the Japanese television series La Grande Maison Tokyo. The production team of Grand Maison Tokyo consulted Chef Shuzo Kishida on the design of the menu items as seen being served in the titular restaurant in the drama.

== See also ==
- List of French restaurants
- List of Michelin three starred restaurants
- List of Michelin-starred restaurants in Japan
