= Ai Tominaga =

Japanese model (born 1982)

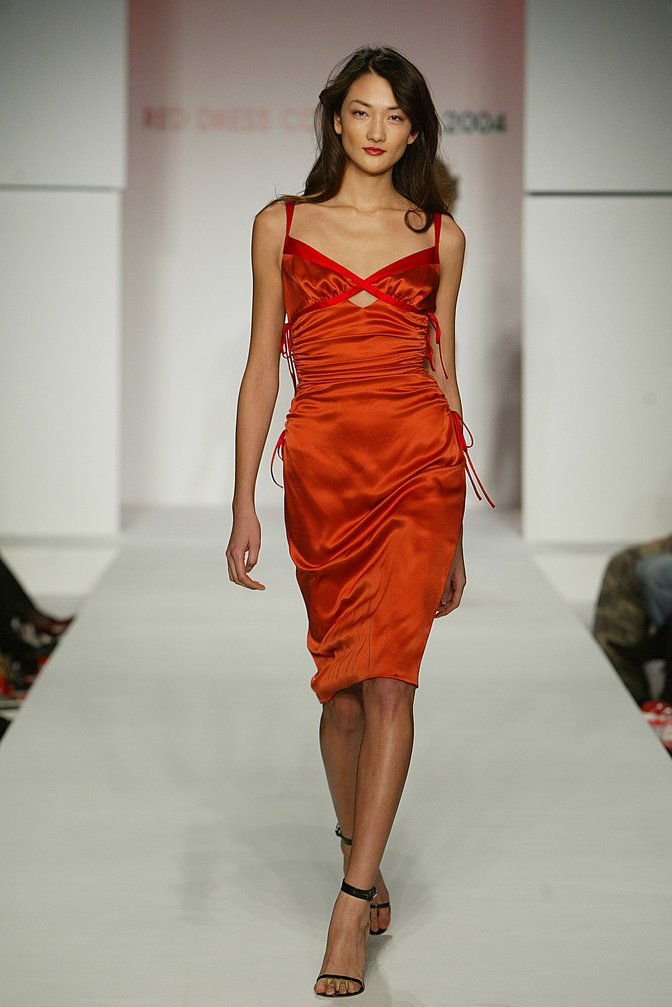
- Tominaga on the runway in 2004 as part of the Red Dress Collection for The Heart Truth campaign
- Born: 1 August 1982 (age 44); Sagamihara, Kanagawa, Japan
- Years active: 1997–present
- Children: 2
- Modeling information
- Height: 1.79 m (5 ft 10 1/2 in)
- Hair color: Dark brown
- Eye color: Brown
- Agency: IMG Models
- Website: www.tominagaai.net

Ai Tominaga (冨永 愛, Tominaga Ai; born 1 August 1982) is a Japanese model and actress. She has been described as one of the first Asian models to walk European catwalks.

== Career ==
She has appeared on the cover of Vogue in her native country, as well as Harper's Bazaar (Japan, China, Singapore, Malaysia, Indonesia), Elle (Japan, Singapore, Hong Kong), Marie Claire (Hong Kong) and Madame Figaro (Taiwan, Thailand). Tominaga has walked in runway shows for John Galliano, Vivienne Tam, Anna Sui, Christian Dior, Karl Lagerfeld, Lanvin, Gucci, Michael Kors, Ralph Lauren, Dolce and Gabbana, Givenchy, Elie Saab, Alexander McQueen and Valentino, among others. Tominaga has appeared in many fashion magazines including Vogue (American, French, British, Japanese, Russian and German), Harper's Bazaar and i-D, and has been shot by photographers such as Annie Leibovitz, Nick Knight, Steven Meisel, Ellen von Unwerth, Mert and Marcus and Peter Lindbergh.

Tominaga has featured in campaigns for Yves Saint Laurent (with top models Jacquetta Wheeler, Carmen Kass and Caroline Ribeiro), Gucci, Hermès, Tag Heuer, Banana Republic and Moschino. Tominaga also appeared in the 2004 Pirelli Calendar. Nowadays, she is based in Tokyo and continued to take on new challenges as a personality on TV, radio and various events, along with modelling.

== Personal life ==
She married a Japanese chef living in Paris in October 2004, and gave birth to a son named Akitsugu in March 2005. The couple divorced in April 2009. She held custody of Akitsugu after her divorce.

On 20 December 2025, she announced her pregnancy with a child from actor Ikken Yamamoto through her Instagram. On 7 May 2026, she gave birth to her second child.

She is based in Tokyo.

== Filmography ==
=== Film ===
- Devilman (2004), Silene
- R100 (2013)
- From the End of the World (2023)
- La Grande Maison Paris (2024), Linda Machiko Richard

=== Television ===
- La Grande Maison Tokyo (2019), Linda Machiko Richard
- Waru (2022), Onimaru
- Ōoku: The Inner Chambers (2023), Tokugawa Yoshimune
- Unbound (2025), Takaoka

=== Dubbing ===
- The Amazing Spider-Man, Receptionist (voiceover for Jill Flint)
