= Kei Kobayashi =

Japanese chef

Kei Kobayashi (小林圭 Kobayashi Kei born 29 August 1977) is a Japanese chef and owner of the restaurant Kei in Paris 1^{e}. His restaurant earned three Michelin stars in 2020. He is the first Japanese chef to earn three Michelin stars in France.

Kobayashi was born in Nagano. He elected to focus on French cuisine after viewing a documentary about Alain Chapel. Kobayashi trained at French restaurants in Japan before moving to France in 1998 to work with Gilles Goujon and Alain Ducasse, at Plaza Athénée.
