= Ae! Group =

Japanese idol boy band

Ae! Group Aぇ! group
- Ae! Group appearance at Kyocera Dome in 2024. From left to right: Ken Kojima, Yoshinori Masakado, Seiya Suezawa, Keita Richard Kusama, and Masaya Sano.

Background information
- Origin: Japan
- Years active: 2019–present
- Label: UJ
- Members: Yoshinori Masakado; Seiya Suezawa; Ken Kojima; Masaya Sano
- Past members: Taisei Fukumoto; Keita Richard Kusama
- Website: Universal Music Japan

Ae! Group (Aぇ! group) (stylized as Ae! group) is a Japanese quartet boy band under Starto Entertainment, formed by Johnny & Associates on February 18, 2019. Their debut single, "A-Beginning", was released on May 15, 2024. They are signed under Universal Music Japan sub-label UJ. The group is produced by Super Eight's You Yokoyama. They occasionally perform as a band and include skits in their concerts.

== History ==
Ae! Group is produced by Super Eight's You Yokoyama. The group's formation was first announced through Johnny's web on February 18, 2019. It consisted of six members who all come from Kansai region. Johnny Kitagawa named the group hoping the six of them would become an excellent group. Their name is read as ee group (ええグループ), which is the Kansai dialect for "good group." Like Super Eight, the group also occasionally performs as a band as well including skits in their concerts.

On December 30, 2023, Starto Entertainment announced that it had terminated its contract with Taisei Fukumoto for breaking violation of the company's regulatory compliance.

On March 16, 2024, through the group's concert "Ae! group A-ttouteki Fan Daikanshasai in Kyocera Dome Osaka ~Minna Honma ni Arigatou~", the group announced their major debut on May 15, 2024, having been informed about it half a year prior by the agency's COO Yoshihiko Inohara and Tadayoshi Okura, who is in largely involved with management of agency's trainees at Kansai region. The group's debut was decided before Fukumoto's departure. Group leader Ken Kojima commented his frustration and hoping he could go back when there was 6 of them, but would do what he had to and continue moving forward with the remaining 5 members. Their debut was under label Universal Music Japan with single "A-Beginning." Ae! group's marks the first group debut for Starto Entertainment. Ae! Group is the fifth group in Kansai region of the agency to make an official debut after KinKi Kids, Super Eight, West, and Naniwa Danshi.

To commemorate their debut on May 15, the group announced a surprise event in Dotonbori's Tombori River walk at Osaka the day before.

=== 2024: Post-debut activities start ===
In September, 2024, the group is announced to be joining Kamigata Boyz, a collaboration unit between the Kansai-origin groups of Starto Entertainment. Ae! Group will be participating starting unit's second digital single, Sekai o Akaruku Terashimashou (世界を明るく照らしましょう) which was released on September 18.

A Japanese dubbed version of the movie New Gods: Yang Jian is scheduled to be released in Japanese theaters on March 21, 2025, under the name "Youzen". It will have member Masaya Sano voicing Youzen, one of the main characters, a bounty hunter who has lost his "divine power", and Toshiki Masuda as Jinkou, a boy who stole "divine power". The group will sing "ROCK'NPOP", which is included in their 1st ALBUM "D.N.A", as the movie's theme song.

=== 2025 ===
In June 2025, the group were announced to cast in the sequel live action movie of Mr. Osomatsu; Snow Man starred in the previous movie. Suezawa, Masakado, Sano, Kojima, and Kusama are reported to star as Osomatsu, Karamatsu, Choromatsu, Ichimatsu, and Juushimatsu, respectively. Kansai Junior trainee Takuya Nishimura will star as Todomatsu.

In August, the group announced their new regular program for Fuji Television titled Ae! Group no Q & Ae!,becoming the group's first program to air in the Kanto region and is scheduled to broadcast from October.

On October 4, it was announced that member Richard Keita Kusama was arrested for indecent exposure early that same morning. This affected the broadcast and streaming of programs which he is involved in: Ae! Group no Q & Ae! (TVer), The Tetsuwan Dash (NTV), Ae!!!!!!ko (MBS), as well their own YouTube channel. Starto Entertainment posted on their site a notice related to the incident and offering an apology for the problems caused by Kusama. Ae! Group no Q & Ae! broadcast on the 13th with the remaining 4 members apologized during opening greetings. Due to this, Toho indefinetly postponed the release of the Mr. Osomatsu: Project Slackers film due to "various circumstances". On November 20 it was informed that he would be out of the group, but continue activities as an individual.

== Members ==
Member list and the musical instrument they are in charge of during band performance.

- Yoshinori Masakado (正門 良規, Masakado Yoshinori) — Guitar
- Seiya Suezawa (末澤 誠也, Suezawa Seiya) — Lead vocal
- Ken Kojima (小島 健, Kojima Ken) — leader; keyboard
- Masaya Sano (佐野 晶哉, Sano Masaya) — Drum

=== Former members ===
- Taisei Fukumoto (福本 大晴, Fukumoto Taisei) — formerly bass, left on December 30, 2023
- Keita Richard Kusama (草間 リチャード 敬太, Kusama Richādo Keita) — Saxophone & bass, left on November 20, 2025

== Discography ==
=== Studio albums ===
List of studio albums, with selected details, chart positions and sales
Title	Details	Peak chart positions			Sales	Certifications
Title	Details	JPN	JPN Comb.	JPN Hot	Sales	Certifications
D.N.A	Released: February 18, 2025; Label: UJ; Formats: CD, CD+DVD, CD+BD	1	1	1	JPN: 247,323	RIAJ: Platinum (phy.)
Runway	Released: February 25, 2026; Label: UJ; Formats: CD, CD+DVD, CD+BD	1	1	2	JPN: 320,675	RIAJ: Platinum (phy.)

=== Singles ===
Title	Year	Peak chart positions			Sales	Certifications	Album
Title	Year	JPN	JPN Comb.	JPN Hot	Sales	Certifications	Album
"A-Beginning"	2024	1	1	2	JPN: 625,044	RIAJ: 3× Platinum (phy.)	D.N.A
"Gotta Be"	2024	1	1	1	JPN: 390,765	RIAJ: Platinum (phy.)	D.N.A
"Chameleon"	2025	1	1	2	JPN: 455,336	RIAJ: 2× Platinum (phy.)	TBA
"Dekoboko Life"	2026	1	1	2	JPN: 484,924	RIAJ: 2× Platinum (phy.)	TBA
"Emotion"	2026	1	1	1	JPN: 479,145		TBA

=== Video albums ===
List of video albums, with selected details
Title	Details	Certifications
Nishi kara Ae! Kaze Fuitemasu!: Otento-sama mo Mitekuretemasunen Live 2022	Released: March 10, 2023; Label: Storm; Formats: DVD	
Ae! Group Debut Tour: Sekai de Ichiban Ae Live	Released: December 4, 2024; Label: UJ; Formats: Blu-ray, DVD	RIAJ: Gold (phy.)

== Tie-ins ==
Year	Title	Tie-in(s)	Album	Note	Note 2
2023	A!!!!!! (Aッ!!!!!!)	Ending theme for the group's TV program Ae!!!!!!iko	-		Pre-debut songs
2023	Junjou Path Finder (純情パスファインダー)	Theme song for TV drama Kaettekitara Ippai Shite.	D.N.A	Ken Kojima lead role	Pre-debut songs
2023	+You	Theme song for MBS/TBS TV program Saturday Plus	D.N.A	Yoshinori Masakado regular guest	Pre-debut songs
2024	Never end	Theme song for TV drama Rikon Kouya	D.N.A	Masaya Sano lead role	
2024	Colorful Days	Commercial song for Hankyu's cake delivery service "Cake Link"	D.N.A		
2025	Rock'N'Pop	Theme song for the Japanese dub version of New Gods: Yang Jian	D.N.A	Sano lead voice role	
2025	Destiny	Theme song for TV drama Musashino Rondo	-	Masakado lead role	

== Solo concert ==
Year	Title	Notes and Ref.
2019	Ae! group First Live Tour 2019 ~Boku-tachi ga Yacchatte Ae!ndesuka? (Aぇ! group First Live Tour 2019〜ボクたちがやっちゃってAぇ!んですか?〜)	Pre-debut
2020	Ae! group Zepp LIVE 2020 STARTING NOW 413	Pre-debut
2022	Nishi Kara Ae! Kaze Fuitemasu! ~Otento-sama mo Mitekuretemasunen Live 2022~ (西からAぇ! 風吹いてます！〜おてんと様も見てくれてますねん LIVE2022〜)	Pre-debut
2023	A!!!!!! to Odoroki Zenkoku Tour 2023 (Aッ!!!!!!と驚き全国ツアー2023)	Pre-debut
2024	A-ttouteki Fan Daikanshasai in Kyocera Dome Osaka ~Minna Honma ni Arigatou~ (Aッ倒的ファン大感謝祭in京セラドーム大阪 〜みんなホンマにありがとう〜)	Pre-debut
2024	Ae! group Debut Tour ~Sekai de Ichiban Ae Live~ (Aぇ! group Debut Tour 〜世界で１番AぇLIVE〜)	
2025	Ae! group LIVE TOUR 2025 D.N.A	
2026	Ae! group Live Tour 2026 Runway (Aぇ! group LIVE TOUR 2026 Runway)	

== Filmography ==
=== Documentary ===
Year	Title	Notes and Ref.
2023	Ride on Time: Kansai Johnny's Jr. no Bouken (連続ドキュメンタリー RIDE ON TIME『関西ジャニーズJr. ～関西ジャニーズJr.の冒険～)	Fuji TV
2024	Borderless: Ae! Group Debut Made no Kiseki (BORDERLESS Aぇ! group デビューまでのキセキ)	Netflix
2024	Borderless: Ae! Group Debut Tour no Uragawa (BORDERLESS Aぇ! group デビューツアーの裏側)	Netflix
