= Seiya Suezawa =

Japanese singer and actor (born 1994)

- 末澤誠也
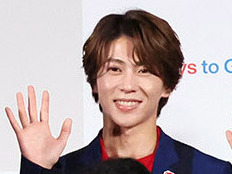
- Suezawa on July 16, 2022.
- Born: August 24, 1994 (age 32); Hyogo Prefecture, Japan
- Occupations: Actor, idol
- Years active: 2009–present
- Musical career
- Genres: J-pop
- Instrument: Vocals
- Label: Universal Music Japan
- Member of: Ae! Group
- Website: 末澤誠也/Seiya Suezawa on Instagram; Ae! Group (Starto Entertainment); Ae! Group (Universal Music Japan)

Seiya Suezawa (Japanese: 末澤 誠也, Suezawa Seiya, born August 24, 1994) is a Japanese idol and actor. He is a member of the male idol group Ae! Group. His nickname is Sue (スエ) and his group-members call him Seiya-kun.

He was born in Hyogo Prefecture. Suezawa is affiliated with Starto Entertainment.

== Biography ==
Due to the influence of his mother, who is a fan of SMAP, he developed an admiration for Takuya Kimura. A friend of Suezawa's mother sent his resume to Johnny & Associates, predecessor of Starto Entertainment. After passing the audition, he joined the agency on April 3, 2009. He then began his activities with the name 'Kansai's Johnny's Jr.'

After entering university, he didn't have much stage opportunity for 2 years. There was a period when he could only work a few times a year as backup dancers at dome shows or other evets that were understaffed. At that time, while practicing daily with a dance club, he decided to quit Kansai's Johnny's Jr. at the end of 2014 to find a job in the fashion industry, which he told his family.

In December that year, his manager encouraged him to take one last dance lesson with the performer Yara Tomoyuki and auditioned to be a backup dancer for Yuma Nakayama's 'Chapter1 歌おうぜ!踊ろうぜ!YOLOぜ!TOUR 2015.' Upon hearing the news that he has passed the audition, he told his parents he would keep trying his best.

On February 18, 2019, he was selected to be a member of Ae! Group. In December, he performed his first solo lead role in the reading theater production "Kiosk" (キオスク).

On May 15, 2024, he released his CD debut as a member of Ae! group. Marking his 15th year affiliation with Starto Entertainment, and making him the oldest member in the agency's history to debut at the age of 29 years and 8 months.

Within the group, he serves as the main vocalist and is also in charge of designing stage costumes. He is the oldest member, being seven years older than the youngest, Masaya Sano. Because he rarely interacted with younger Kansai Juniors, he was nicknamed "the Mad Dog of Kansai.

== Personal life ==
He began dancing since first grade of elementary school after attending a trial lesson. Because his hip-hop dance teacher also taught tap dance, he started learning tap in the second grade. During his university years, he performed contemporary dance in a student club, which was praised by Tomoyuki Yara; he later showcased this style in Yuma Nakayama's song "Mai, Koi" (舞い、恋). Although often referred to as one of his special skills, he has said, "People call it a special skill, but I only put it in my profile because there's nothing else to write."

His motto is a quote by Walt Disney's "If you have the courage to pursue your dreams, they can come true."

During high school, when he was struggling with interpersonal relationships and considering transferring schools, a teacher he consulted encouraged him to run for student council president, the role which he eventually served.

He has a brother three years older than him.

On February 18, 2025, he opened his official Instagram account.

== Filmography ==
=== TV Drama ===
- 年下彼氏 Episode 14 (May 23, 2020, Asahi Broadcasting Corporation Television) – Starring as Ritsu Mizuki
- Familiar Wife (知ってるワイフ) (January 7 – March 18, 2021, Fuji Television) – Starring as Kyosuke Shinohara
- ジモトに帰れないワケあり男子の14の事情 Episodes 1 and Finale (April 17 – June 19, 2021, TV Asahi) – Starring as Makito
- ボーイフレンド降臨! (October 15 – December 17, 2022, TV Asahi) – Starring as Kensuke Kurose
- 彼女と彼氏の明るい未来 (January 12 – February 23, 2024, Mainichi Broadcasting System) – Starring as Ichiro Aoyama (Co-starring with Nagisa Sekimizu)
- クリエイタードラゴン「真夜中の社内恋愛」(December 24, 2024, Nippon Television) – Starring as Seiya Suezawa

=== Web drama ===
- 知ってるシノハラ (January 7 – March 18, 2021, FOD) – Starring as Kyosuke Shinohara
- 黒瀬降臨! (November 19 – December 3, 2022, TELASA) – Starring as Kensuke Kurose

=== Film ===
- Mentor (2026), Takumi
- Mr. Osomatsu: Project Slackers (2026), Osomatsu

=== TV Program ===
- Nakagawa Kojo (October 4, 2019 – NHK General TV through NHK Osaka Broadcasting Station)
- 2時45分からはスローでイージーなルーティーンで (October 28, 2021 – September 28, 2023, Kansai TV) – Host of the "DIYってこんなにイージーでAぇ!んですか？" segment on the monthly Thursdays

=== Radio Program ===
- 関西ジャニーズJr.のバリバリサウンド→カンバリ! (April 2, 2019 – March 18, 2025, FM Osaka) – Appeared with Masakado Yoshiki and Kojima Ken. He alternated weekly with the three members of AmBitious.
- Aぇ! group末澤誠也のAぇラジ -ドラマもラジオも熱くしてやるよ- (January 21, 2024, MBS Radio)

=== Stage performances ===
- 少年たち 世界の夢が...戦争を知らない子供たち (August 2–26, 2015, Osaka Shochikuza)
- ドッグファイト (December 11–14, 2015, Sankei Hall Breeze / December 17–30, Theater Crea / January 7–8, 2016, Tokai City Arts Theater Main Hall)
  - ドッグファイト (December 8–11, 2017, Sankei Hall Breeze / December 14–30, Theater Crea / January 6, 2018, Aichi Prefectural Arts Theater Main Hall)
- JOHNNYS' Future WORLD (October 8–25, 2016, Umeda Arts Theater)
- 滝沢歌舞伎 2018 (June 4 – January 30, 2018, Misonoza)
- スケリグ (January 11 – February 11, 2019, DDD Aoyama Cross Theater / February 14, Panasonic IMP Hall / February 16, Bisai Civic Hall / February 19, Hokuriku Shimbun Akabane Hall / February 23–24, Luna Hall Large Hall) – as Michael
- リーディングシアター『キオスク』(December 25–29, 2019, Tokyo Metropolitan Theatre Theater East / January 18–19, 2020, Hyogo Performing Arts Center Hankyu Middle Hall) – as leading role Franz
- 青木さん家の奥さん (June 18 – July 3, 2022, Tokyu Theatre Orb / July 14–16, 2022, Orix Theatre) – as Greg Connell
- THE BOY FROM OZ supported by JACCS (June 18, 2022 – July 3, 2022, Tokyu Theatre Orb / July 14–16, 2022, Orix Theater) – as Greg Connell
- ミュージカル『三銃士』(September 8–28, 2024, Nissay Theatre / October 4–6, 2024, Hiroshima Bunka Gakuen HBG Hall / October 18–27, 2024, Sky Theatre MBS) – as D'Artagnan

=== Concerts ===
- 関西ジャニーズJr. 『X'mas Show 2016』(November 30 – December 25, 2016, Osaka Shochikuza)
- 関西ジャニーズJr. 春のSHOW合戦 (March 4–28, 2017, Osaka Shochikuza)
- 関西ジャニーズJr. Concert 2018 〜Happy New ワン Year〜 (January 3 & 4, 2018, Osaka-jo Hall)
- マイナビ サマステライブ2023 俺たちがミライだ!! (August 21, 2023, EX THEATER ROPPONGI) – as a PAISEN supporter

=== Events ===
- FM OSAKA 55th anniversary リスナー感謝祭〜カンバリ！春のFAN祭り〜 (February 7, 2025, Osaka-jo Hall)

=== Music video ===
- KEN☆Tackey
  - 逆転ラバーズ (Dance Video) (2018)
  - 浮世艶姿桜 (Dance Video) (2018)

=== Advertisement ===
- ライブパフォーマンスショー『STOMP ストンプ』(August–September 2025)
