= Hidamari no Ki =

Japanese manga series

- The cover of the first volume of Hidamari no Ki.

陽だまりの樹
- Manga
- Written by: Osamu Tezuka
- Published by: Shogakukan
- Magazine: Big Comic
- Original run: April 25, 1981 – December 25, 1986
- Volumes: 11
- Anime television series
- Directed by: Gisaburō Sugii
- Produced by: Hiroshi Yamashita; Michiru Ōshima; Manabu Tamura; Masao Maruyama
- Written by: Tatsuhiko Urahata
- Music by: Keiko Matsui
- Studio: Madhouse
- Original network: Nippon TV
- Original run: April 4, 2000 – September 19, 2000
- Episodes: 25
- Television drama
- Directed by: Takashi Fujio; Munenobu Yamauchi; Hironobu Okano
- Produced by: NHK; Telepack
- Written by: Yōichi Maekawa
- Music by: Toshiyuki Honda
- Studio: NHK Enterprises
- Original network: NHK BS Premium
- Original run: April 6, 2012 – June 22, 2012
- Episodes: 12

Hidamari no Ki (陽だまりの樹; lit. "Tree in the Sun") is a Japanese manga series written and illustrated by Osamu Tezuka about a friendship between a samurai and a doctor in the final decade of the Tokugawa Shogunate. Hidamari no Ki received the Shogakukan Manga Award in 1984 for general manga.

The story is partly based on Tezuka's great-grandfather who was one of the Japanese physicians pushing for acceptance of Western medical practice at the time. The title is a metaphor for the Tokugawa shogunate which is compared to an old camphor tree which has enjoyed the sunshine and shelter from the winds for 300 years, but is slowly dying because it is being eaten away from the inside by termites and gribbles.

It was adapted into an anime series, by Madhouse and premiered in Japan on NTV on April 4, 2000. It was also adapted into a television drama, and also a 2021 stage play starring Sugeta Rinne of the boyband 7 MEN Samurai.

== Plot ==
The story follows two young men whose lives intersect during the political turbulence and social upheaval in Japan in the time before the Meiji Restoration in 1868. Dr. Ryoan Tezuka is a medical student attracted to the radical new of Western medicine under Kōan Ogata, while Manjiro Ibuya is a samurai who is a staunch supporter of honor and tradition. They both encounter and fall in love with the same woman, O-Seki, the daughter of a respected Temple priest. Ryoan's idealism is gradually eroded, and he marries, settles down and takes over his father's medical practice. Meanwhile, Manjiro rises through the ranks of samurai society and the shogun initially gives him the delicate task of managing a United States emissary and later to turn farmers into an armed infantry.

== Characters ==
Ryoan Tezuka (手塚良庵, Tezuka Ryōan)
Voiced by Koichi Yamadera
Ryoan is a medical student with a gentle and inquiring nature, but also a well-known womanizer. He is the son of the doctor Ryosen Tezuka in Azabu, Edo during the Ansei era who is a proponent of integrating Western medicine into Japan. Ryoan is also attracted to the radical new Western medicine and travels to Osaka to study with Kōan Ogata.
Manjiro Ibuya (伊武谷万二郎, Ibuya Manjirō)
Mitsuru Miyamoto
Manjiro is a traditionalist and essentially a self-taught samurai who is inclined to be hot-headed. He initially joins the Gembukan dōjō to develop his skills, but is forced to leave after killing two of its members while defending Ryoan Tezuka. He is eventually recognized by the shogunate for evacuating displaced people of the Great Ansei earthquake and was selected as the guard of the US mission in Japan.
O-Seki (おせき, O seki)
O-Seki is the beautiful daughter of a priest at the local Zenshouji Temple in Azabu and courted by both Ryoan Tezuka and Manjiro Ibuya.

== Production ==
Hidamari no Ki is considered part of Osamu Tezuka's last artistic period, which focused on more realistic historical works (e.g. Message to Adolf). Rather than being set in an imaginary world, as are many of Tezuka's earlier works, historical context plays an important role for the action of the characters and for dramatic effect. Many of these works depict turbulent or revolutionary historical periods like here the Meiji Restoration.

Tezuka was inspired for the manga by his interest in his own genealogy. This was sparked by researcher Yasuaki Fukase, who wrote a thesis about his great-grandfather Ryosen Tezuka and sent it to the manga artist with a personal letter. Tezuka then found episodes about Ryoan Tezuka in a biography of Yukichi Fukuzawa, who was a classmate of Ryoan Tezuka's at Koan Ogata's private school for Western medicine in Osaka.

A characteristic of Tezuka's last artistic period is having at least two interrelated main characters, here Manjiro and Ryan, who react very differently to the historical events they witness and who because of this end up on opposing ends of societal and political conflict. This leads to them questioning their own values and worldview, when they end up meeting their old friends again. Like many other manga series by Tezuka such as Black Jack, Hidamari no Ki has a physician as a main character.

Hidamari no Ki, ending in 1986, is one of Tezuka's last longer serializations before his death in 1989. Already ill at the time of writing, he foreshadowed his death by showing his own father - looking like Tezuka himself - dying in volume 9.

== Publication ==
The manga was released by Shogakukan in eleven tankōbon released between July 1, 1988, and January 1, 1989. The manga was re-released as eight tankōbon, the first five on March 17, 1995 and the final three on July 17 of the same year. The series was re-released in 6 kanzenbans between September 7, 1999, and January 27, 2000. The series was released in 6 widebans in 2008, the first on August 29, the second and third on September 30, and the final three on October 30.

It was published in France by Tonkam.

=== Volume listing ===
No.	Release date	ISBN
1	July 1, 1988	4-09-197021-4
2	August 10, 1988	4-09-197022-2
3	September 10, 1988	4-09-197023-0
4	October 10, 1988	4-09-197024-9
5	October 10, 1988	4-09-197025-7
6	November 10, 1988	4-09-197026-5
7	January 1, 1989	4-09-197027-3

=== Anime adaptation ===
The series was adapted into a 25-episode anime television series directed by Gisaburô Sugii. It was broadcast on NTV between April 4 and September 19, 2000. VAP released a series of 9 DVDs, each containing 2 or 3 episodes of the anime. They were released between June 21, 2000, and February 21, 2001.

==== Episode list ====
No.	Title	Original release date
1	"The Hill of the Three Hundred (Note: The title refers to the 300 year old tree on a hill near the Genbukan dojo.)" Transliteration: "Sanbyaku Saka" (Japanese: 三百坂)	April 4, 2000
On the first day of the Ansei Era, November 1854, in Azabu, Edo, Ryoan Tezuka and his father return home early in the morning after spending the night with geishas. Meanwhile, Manjiro Ibuya, a young samurai recruit of the Fushuu clan, joins their daily march to the castle for the day, but during the strenuous race uphill, master Shusaku Chiba falls and dies. Manjiro is distraught as he had just joined the Genbukan dojo to learn swordsmanship, but teacher Hachiro Kiyokawa decides to give him a lesson, with real swords. Manjiro arrives home late with a sword wound from his lesson and his parents call for the doctor. Ryoan Tezuka, the known womanizer arrives instead of his father Ryosen, and Manjiro initially refuses to be treated. Later, Ryoan receives notice that he has been accepted into Tekiteki Saijuku (Medical School) to study under Doctor Kouan Ogata in Osaka. That night members of the Koushougakuha (practitioners of traditional medicine) visit the Tezuka household to warn Ryousen against using a Dutch smallpox vaccine, but Ryoan throws them out.
2	"Ryoan Sets Sail"; Transliteration: "Ryuan Shupan" (Japanese: 良庵出帆)	April 11, 2000
Some months later, on the eve of Ryoan's departure to Osaka, he discovers that both he and Manjiro are courting O-Seki, the daughter of a priest at the local Zenshouji Temple. Both young men declare their love to her, but in markedly different ways. As Ryoan leaves, he is attacked by swordsmen hired by the Koushougakuha to disable him. Manjiro intervenes and kills two of them, but one escapes and Manjiro recognizes them as being from the Genbukan Chiba dojo. Manjiro confesses to the incident and faces a trial by wooden sword which he wins. However, Hachirou Kiyokawa says that he must "officially" kill Manjiro so the dojo can save face, and tells him to leave. Manjiro refuses, so they prepare to duel, but another young Genbukan swordsman, Tetsutarou Yamaoka, intervenes and convinces Manjiro to train in the Hokushin Ittoryu style under him. Meanwhile, as Ryoan prepares to leave for Osaka, O-Seki arrives to say goodbye, but Ryoan is embarrassed as a number of geishas also appear for the same reason.
3	"The Sonezaki Shinchi District"; Transliteration: "Sonezaki Shinchi" (Japanese: 曾根崎新地)	April 18, 2000
On arrival in Osaka, Ryoan heads immediately to the Sonezaki Geisha district and is taken by the beauty of Toumiyakko. However, she develops a stomach pain which he diagnoses as appendicitis so he treats her pain, and they spent the night together. In the morning, she is in a worse condition, but as a western medical practitioner he is prohibited from treating her and the local doctor Inokawa is called. Inokawa diagnoses worms and prescribes a medicine against the advice of Ryoan. Toumiyakko insists that Ryoan treats her, and after he settles up with the owner of Kyoujiya, he moves in with Toumiyakko. Untreated, Toumiyakko's appendicitis worsens and Ryoan prepares to operate, but he lacks confidence. Inokawa arrives with a policeman to arrest Ryoan who humiliates himself and apologises to Inokawa, hoping to save Toumiyakko, but she quietly dies while Inokawa argues about the merits of traditional medicine and at Toumiyakko's wake, Ryoan regrets his inexperience. Meanwhile, in Edo, Yamaoka takes Manjiro to reside with Touko Fujita of the powerful Mito clan. Fujita tells Ryoan of the nearby old camphor tree which has collected the sun and been sheltered from the wind for 300 years, calm and secure, but like the shogunate, termites and gribbles have been eating the tree away, killing it from the inside.
4	"Before the Storm"; Transliteration: "Arashi no Mae" (Japanese: 嵐の前)	April 25, 2000
In Osaka, Ryoan meets Kouan Ogata at the Tekiteki Saijuku (Tekijuku) who praises his father's work with smallpox vaccines. Ryoan finds the place lice-ridden and his fellow students unkempt and slovenly, so he goes to stay at Sonezaki Shinchi. Back in Edo, his father Ryosen Tezuka vainly tries to set up a vaccination facility and manages to get an audience at the castle with Takimanokami Endou, but he is instead harshly questioned by the Shoguns physicians (Koushougakuha). They are dissatisfied with the treaties signed with Perry and Putyatin and they secretly engage Otojirou Kusunoki of the Boshu in Chiba to kill the doctors practicing western medicine when they meet at the Tezuka household. When Kusunoki goes to the house, he encounters O-Seki and attempts to rape her, but Manjiro arrives and saves her, also averting the planned massacre of the doctors.
5	"The Great Earthquake of the Ansei Era"; Transliteration: "Ansei no Ojishin" (Japanese: 安政の大地震)	May 2, 2000
The Koushougakuha hire a large group of ronin to again attack the Tezuka household and the doctors promoting western medicine. However, they withdraw when government officials also arrive at the house, leaving only Otojirou and another ronin Ushikubo Toubei known as "Wild Dog", who decide to proceed. The two ronin begin drinking as they wait until the meeting is in progress when suddenly the city of Edo is shaken by a severe earthquake. Manjiro immediately rushes to see O-Seki at the temple but she has already left. A thousand displaced people head to the temple for safety, but because it is a fire hazard, Manjiro convinces them to walk to the nearby Shibahama beach and saves them all. He finds O-Seki safe in another temple and asks if she would consider marrying him, but she declines because his life is one of killing. He swears never to kill again and she agrees to marry. When Manjiro returns to the beach he finds the people being extorted by a gang claiming it is their territory. When the gang attack him, he slays them all, breaking the vow he just made to O-Seki.
6	"Vaccination Clinic"; Transliteration: "Jotokan" (Japanese: 除痘館)	May 9, 2000
Ryoan assists at Kouan Ogata's smallpox vaccination clinic, but they have a difficult time convincing the general population that the process is safe. When they visit Zen'emon Ninaya, a sick shop owner, he refuses to be vaccinated which risks his family, staff and customers with the smallpox infection. Ryoan tracks down others who may be infected and gets beaten up by an infected yakuza named Heita after suggesting he should be vaccinated. Ryoan then follows him to a yakuza reconciliation ceremony, and receives permission for him to be vaccinated on the condition he is returned before the end of the ceremony. Meanwhile, Jinshichirou Saeki of the Fuchuu clan introduces Manjiro to council member Masahiro Abe because of his success saving the people on Shibahama beach. When Manjiro is asked his opinion of the current "crisis" he openly speaks his mind, even mentioning the corruption in government. However, even after Manjiro creates a rukus when he hears the Koushougakuha planning to attack Ryosen Tezuka, Abe considers him as a candidate for the new generation of army leaders.
7	"Harris Arrives in Port"; Transliteration: "Harisu Raikou" (Japanese: ハリス来航)	May 16, 2000
Kouan Ogata asks Ryoan to convince O-Shina from the Ninaya store to be vaccinated. Ryoan follows her, but then finds her in the company of her fiancée, Gentaku Inokawa of the Hanaoka School and Doctor Inokawa's eldest son. The next day O-Shina reveals to Ryoan that she is being forced to marry Gentaku, but in fact loves Manjiro who saved her at Shibahama beach. She has also been forbidden to be vaccinated by her adopted father Zen'emon Ninaya and runs away. A woman who has been following Ryoan called Okon of the Seven Ghosts offers to help him. She arranges for Gentaku to be found in a compromising position with her, cancelling the engagement and then blackmailing him as well. That year, the U.S. envoy, Townsend Harris arrives in Japan, and is kept under the watchful eye of the magistrate at the Gyokuzenji Temple in Izu, Shimoda. To his horror, Manjiro is assigned to guard him. One day while he and Heusken take a walk, they are confronted by "Wild Dog" Toubei intent on killing them, but Manjiro arrives in time to save them and Toubei withdraws rather than fight.
8	"Sad News and Expulsion"; Transliteration: "Hihou to Hamon" (Japanese: 悲報と破門)	May 23, 2000
Manjiro accompanies Heusken while he investigates an abandoned industrial site mentioned by Perry in his journals, but finds little evidence of its existence. Manjiro is then directed to another site which is an iron foundry designed for making cannons. He meets Sanai Hashimoto, dean of the Meidoukan School who explains that Japan can never defeat the westerners without a centralized government and needs to abandon its antiquated self-serving and corrupt clan system. Back in Edo, Okon approaches Ryoan to attend an autopsy of a beheaded criminal and she confirms that he is her former husband. He treated her badly physically and emotionally, and forced her to work as a nighthawk. (Note: Prostitute (夜鷹, Yotaka)) Kouan Ogata threatens to expel Ryoan for bringing Okon, but gives him a chance if he will study and learn Hufeland's translated notes on anatomy. Fellow student Fukusawa agrees to help him. Meanwhile, Manjiro receives news his father has died, and immediately returns to Edo.
9	"Showdown at Kand River"; Transliteration: "Kanda Gawa no Taiketsu" (Japanese: 神田川の対決)	May 30, 2000
Manjiro's family believe that his father fell into the river while drunk and suffered a heart attack, but Ryosen Tezuka tells him later that he was attacked by an assassin and died after falling into the cold Kand River. Ryosen Tezuka can only give a rough description of the assailant, but Manjiro asks a yazuka to make inquiries. Following Manjiro's promotion, Ryosen and the western doctors ask Manjiro to press their case for a vaccination clinic. Meanwhile, the yakuza identifies Otojirou Kusunoki as the assailant and when Manjiro meets him, he recognizes him as the man who tried to rape O-Seki. They cross swords, but Manjiro falls into the river and Kusunoki departs. In Osaka, Ryoan dedicates himself to studying Hufeland's notes and prevents his expulsion from Ogata's school. He receives news that the vaccination clinic has been approved in Edo and so he is sent back to assist his father.
10	"The Petition"; Transliteration: "Seigan Sho" (Japanese: 請願書)	June 6, 2000
In 1858, the Shogun calls a meeting to discuss Harris' request for trade, and Manjiro attends even though he has a high fever. However, after he presents the doctors' petition to Councillor Abe, Finance Minister Kawaji gives Manjiro the money that the Shogun's physician gave him as a gift to commence preparations for the vaccination clinic. Back home, Manjiro receives a visit from O-Shina who gives him a man's kimono. She then tries to buy a samurai's lineage so that she will appear to come from a samurai family, but the samurai turns out to be Toubei. He gives her the documents, but when she says the samurai is Manjiro Ibuya, he becomes enraged and rapes her. Meanwhile as Ryoan sails from Osaka to Edo, he enchants a seasick young woman. When they arrive, Okon is at the port, hoping to continue her good fortune by involving herself in Ryoan's career. Ryoan arrives home and finds that his parents have arranged a marriage with Otsune, the daughter of a distant relative. When they arrive, he recognizes her as the girl he met on the ship.
11	"Audience with the Shogun"; Transliteration: "Shougun Ekken" (Japanese: 将軍謁見)	June 13, 2000
Manjiro encounters Ryoan walking home after a night on the town and he tells Manjiro about his impending arranged marriage to Otsune. Later, the two young men are told that Harris has demanded to see the Shogun Iesada Tokugawa in Edo, but the shogun is not fit to receive him. The court physicians are given a month to cure him and they have secretly asked the western doctors to help because they fear they cannot heal him. Manjiro and Ryoan are given the task of finding a solution. Toubei is now living with O-Shina, is hired to prevent Harris from reaching Edo. When O-Shina learns Harris is guarded by Manjiro, she pleads with him not to kill him, and after they violently argue, Toubei decides not to take the job. Meanwhile, Ryoan reluctantly marries Otsune and falls asleep dead drunk on his wedding night. In Edo castle, following an idea by Ryoan, a man is secreted beneath the frail shogun to speak on his behalf and the subterfuge is successful.
12	"The Shogunate Physicians"; Transliteration: "Oku Ishi" (Japanese: 奥医師)	June 20, 2000
Doctor Itou and shogun physician Genpaku Taki tell Ryoan that Shogun Iesada is bedridden by a mystery disease, however the court physicians believe it is only exhaustion. Ryoan travels to Osaka to research Ogata's library for the shogun's symptoms, and after ten days of research, he is given a book by Addison written in English. He travels back to Edo and with Manjiro's assistance, he persuades the American translator Heusken to translate it for him and discovers the diagnosis of failing kidneys and a potential cure, but they cannot contact Genpaku Taki who has since been locked up. Meanwhile, Manjiro encounters Kichinosuke Saigou who explains that the succession to the shogun is already being planned and that a strong leader such as Yoshinobu is required to save Japan from similar fates to those of India and China who were invaded by the English and French.
13	"Creation of the Vaccination Clinic"; Transliteration: "Shutou Sho Setsuritsu" (Japanese: 種痘所設立)	June 27, 2000
The head monk of the Zenpukuji Temple asks Manjiro to stop Harris from moving there, but Manjiro says he cannot help. As the health of the shogun declines, the Masayoshi Hotta faction gain power in court and Manjiro is removed from his post. Genpaku Taki is notified that he plus two others are to be appointed as shogunate physicians, but after they go to the castle, Taki Seisai Hougan, representative of shogunate physicians tells them that there has been a mistake, and are asked to leave. Genpaku Taki takes the opportunity to present their petition to set up a vaccination clinic to the chief minister Kamon-no-kami Ii who approves their request.
14	"Korori's Visit"; Transliteration: "Korori Sanjou" (Japanese: コロリ参上)	July 4, 2000
In 1859, the Edo vaccination clinic is operational, but they hear of a cholera (コロリ, korori) outbreak in Nagasaki after the visit of a U.S. ship. Okon approaches Ryoan to assist with setting up an okiya of her own, and after an entertaining night with two geishas he agrees, but cholera soon arrives in Edo, and Okon becomes infected. Ryoan immediately goes to her aid, and meanwhile the Tezuka family do what they can to help those infected, administering boiled water and salt to deal with dehydration. The epidemic takes many lives, including that of Ryoan's mother. Eventually the Western Medicine Prohibition Law is lifted, but it is too late for the shogun who dies in that year.
15	"Imprisonment"; Transliteration: "Tougoku" (Japanese: 投獄)	July 11, 2000
Manjiro is accused of plotting against the shogunate and arrested due to his association with Kichinosuke Saigou and even his former master, the chief retainer from the Fuchuu clan, denies knowing him. The Ibuya family house is repossessed and it is some time before Ryoan is informed this situation position by the southern magistrate. With the downfall of the Masayoshi Hotta faction, Naosuke Ii consolidates his power in court by oppressing the other clans. However the prison doctor assists Manjiro by apparently giving him cholera, causing him to be thrown out of prison where he is rescued by Ryoan. Manjiro reluctantly goes to live with the Mito clan as it is the only way to guarantee his safety even though he is theoretically dead.
16	"Storm of the Spring"; Transliteration: "Haru no Arashi" (Japanese: 春の嵐)	July 18, 2000
The Ansei Purge (安政の大獄, Ansei no taigoku) by the shogunate continues, with a crackdown on the Joui movement. Manjiro manages to get an audience with the Mito clan chief retainer Tatewaki Aijma. He clams to be a Takeki, but by quoting the Written Teachings of Koudoukan, he is accepted into the Mito clan. Meanwhile, Otsune is about to give birth, and because of complications, Ryosen Tezuka attempts a cesarean section as he receives news that a huge fire in Kanda threatens the vaccination clinic. Ryoan successfully completes the procedure, but the clinic is destroyed. Ryoan visits Okon at her okiya in Yokohama and asks if any of her wealthy clients can help fund the clinic's restoration. She introduces him to the timber merchant Yazaemon Tamaya who agrees to consider helping. On their way to Edo, they are stopped by the ronin Toubei who kills Tamaya. The Ansei Purge continues until 1860 when the Man'en era commences following the assassination of the dictator Naosuke Ii. Ryoan then feels that it is safe to tell O-Seki that Manjiro is still alive.
17	"Return"; Transliteration: "Kikan" (Japanese: 帰還)	July 25, 2000
The Mito clan end the Ansei Purge and Manjiro is called to Edo castle where is made a retainer of the shogunate and receives a new house. He is sent to guard Harris who is living at the Zenpukuji Temple, but on the way he encounters O-Seki, but also a group of hired assassins after Harris. He defends O-Seki, killing some of them, but he is then confronted by the ronin Toubei. Toubei runs off but Manjiro follows him to his home where he lives with O-Shina and their baby. Toubei is not there and Manjiro does not recognize O-Shina as the woman he saved at Shibahama beach and who declared her love for him. Ryosen Tezuka has a stroke and his friend and colleague Doctor Otsuki Shunsai, head of the School of Western Medicine, takes ill and dies. Ryoan keeps news of Shunsai's death from his bedridden father.
18	"Partings"; Transliteration: "Sekibetsu" (Japanese: 惜別)	August 1, 2000
The Man'en era gives way to the Bunkyū era and O-Seki's elderly father dies. Manjiro is told by Rintarou Katsu that Japan must strengthen its military, avoid fighting the Joui and negotiate with the westerners on more equal terms. Manjiro is given the challenging task of transforming non-aligned but inexperienced peasants into a military force within six months. Ryoan tells Manjiro that O-Seki has joined a nunnery so he pleads with her to leave with him, but she insists that she has taken the path of non-violence to serve the Buddha. Ryoan's father dies and Ryoan announces that he will succeed his father and take on his legacy.
19	"Visitors"; Transliteration: "Raihou Sha" (Japanese: 来訪者)	August 8, 2000
Ryoan takes over his father's medical practice, but lacks some of the tact and friendly manner of the father. On the day Kouan Ogata arrives in Edo to take up the position of President of the School of Western Medicine, three badly wounded ex-Mito samurai arrive at Ryoan's home. He treats their wounds, but then hands them over to the authorities. Later, Ogata invites him to become a Military Base Physician to treat wounded troops in the field. This is not what Ryoan wants to do, but it would provide a regular income. Meanwhile, Manjiro is invited to join the Roushigumi but refuses saying that his duty is to train the infantry, even if they are only peasants.
20	"Military Station Physician"; Transliteration: "Tonsho Duke Ishi" (Japanese: 屯所付医師)	August 15, 2000
Ryoan agonizes over whether to accept the position as Military Base Physician, and goes to stay with Okon. Okon plans to bid for a timber supply contract with to the military, but learns that the Seikichi Tamaya, the unscrupulous adopted son of Yazaemon Tamaya, is her main competitor. Seikichi tells Okon that he knows of her former life as a nighthawk in Osaka and the identifying tattoo on her rear. Ryoan offers to remove the tattoo with a skin graft although he has never tried it before. After the operation, Ryoan encounters Chief Denkichi who suspects Seikichi of criminal activities. Under pressure from the Joui, the shogunate announces that it will attack the western warships anchored off Port Shinagawa causing panic in the city, but the attack never eventuates. Meanwhile, Seikichi hires two assassins to kill Okon, however Denkichi intervenes at the last minute and arrests them. Ryoan's skin graft proves successful and Okon wins the timber supply contract. The legendary physician Ogata collapses and dies, and Ryoan promises on his deathbed to become the Military Base Physician.
21	"Infantrymen Take to the Field"; Transliteration: "Hohei Gumi Shutsujin" (Japanese: 歩兵組出陣)	August 22, 2000
On a chilly evening, O-Shina secretly takes her baby daughter to Ryoan for vaccination, but she refuses to reveal her name. At a village in Kazusa, Otojirou Kusunoki and a group of ronin take over an inn as headquarters for the group they call Shinchuugumi (真忠組). They begin to extort money from the villagers which they then distribute to gain popular acceptance. Manjiro is ordered to take his infantry to arrest the Shinchuugumi, but many of his men initially refuse to fight them believing that they are also peasants. They then agree to follow Manjiro along with Ryoan who takes up his post as Military Base Physician and attend to the wounded. Seikichi hires Toubei to kill Okon when she is scheduled to meet the British journalist Charles Wirgman, but as Toubei is about to kill them, Manjiro and his infantry arrive and shoot him. As Toubei dies, he kills the cowardly Seikichi. Manjiro then recognizes Toubei as the assassin who was hired to kill Harris.
22	"Assault at Dawn"; Transliteration: "Akatsuki no Kyoushuu" (Japanese: 暁の強襲)	August 29, 2000
Manjiro marches his infantry towards the Shinchuugumi and encounter a woman traveler along the road. The woman, Aya, reaches Kazusa first, where she meets her brother Otojirou Kusunoki and informs him of the status of Manjiro's infantry. He demands more information and sends her back to nearby Tougane where the infantry is camped but she is caught eavesdropping. At dawn, Manjiro's infantry attacks the Shinchuugumi headquarters and prevail, but inside Manjiro comes face to face with their leader Kusunoki and after a savage fight, Manjiro kills him. On his return to Edo, Manjiro is commended on his victory and given a raise along with a Spencer repeating rifle as a gift.
23	"Dispatch of Troops to Choshu"; Transliteration: "Choushuu Shuppei" (Japanese: 長州出兵)	September 5, 2000
In 1864, the first year of the Gengi era, Manjiro is attacked in the street by Aya Kusunoki attempting to avenge her brother. However, she is in a poor mental state after being beaten on the head while in captivity and Manjiro decides to care for her at his family home. The Choshu clan played a central role in the Sonnou Joui movement, and the shogunate decides to curb their influence. Kichinosuke Saigou is placed in charge of a punitive expedition. On the way, Manjiro's infantry behave badly in Osaka, and an inn customer, the ronin Ryouma Sakamoto (formerly of the Tosa clan) helps him subdue three drunk soldiers. Sakamoto takes Manjiro out drinking and declares that he agrees with Kaishuu Katsu that the shogunate era is over and the Emperor will take charge, open up to the west and create a new modern legal system for the country. Takamori Saigou also tries to convince Manjiro to join him and Katsu to push for change. Manjiro refuses but is then place under house arrest for associating with the dissidents.
24	"Direct Petition"; Transliteration: "Jikiso" (Japanese: 直訴)	September 12, 2000
In 1865 the Keiou era began and the Choushuu move to overthrow the shogunate. Casualties are high and Ryoan despairs of constantly patching up wounded soldiers who are sent back into battle. With the shogunate losing against the insurgency and incompetent ministers at the top, Manjiro appeals to Katsu to reform the shogunate, but he is waiting for the shogunate to self destruct. Eventually, three years later, Shogun Yoshinobu Tokugawa cedes power to the Emperor, but the conflict continues and the shogunate disintegrates. Manjiro goes to petition the shogun but finds that he has fled the castle to Ueno, marking the end of the shogunate. Manjiro is devastated.
25	"Dawn"; Transliteration: "Yoake" (Japanese: 夜明け)	September 19, 2000
Kaishuu Katsu and Takamori Saigou negotiate a bloodless surrender of Edo Castle and it is handed over to the imperial forces although some still loyal to the shogun create trouble. Meanwhile, Aya has somewhat recovered and when Ryoan asks if she will marry Manjiro, she indicates yes. On the day of their wedding, the Shougitai at Ueno prepare for a last ditch defense and Manjiro recalls his vow to defend the shogunate. Manjiro dresses for battle and walks alone towards Ueno, where he encounters his original group of infantrymen who decide to join him. They attack the Imperial forces, but Saigou has cannons aimed at the gates and opens fire with devastating results. Manjiro orders his men to escape the cannon fire and they reluctantly disperse while he makes a last charge against the Imperial forces. Nine years later, Japan has dramatically changed and Ryoan sees Manjiro in the streets of Shinbashi on his way to Kyushu and then encounters Okon who still is grateful for all his help. In a postscript Osamu Tezuka tells how Ryoan was his great-grandfather who later contracted dysentery in Kyushu and died in Osaka.

=== Soundtrack CD ===
On June 21, 2000, VAP released a soundtrack CD for the Hidamari no Ki anime. The songs are performed by Keiko Matsui and are composed by Kazu Matsui.

=== TV drama ===
The manga was adapted into a live-action television drama. The series' script was written by Yoichi Maekawa and was directed by Takashi Fujio. It was produced by Kazukiyo Morishita and Takahisa Goto. Its twelve episodes were broadcast on NHK between April 6 and June 22, 2012.

==== Cast ====
- Hayato Ichihara as Manjiro Ibutani
- Hiroki Narimiya as Ryoan Tezuka
- Mei Kurokawa as Oseki
- Tokuma Nishioka as Sensaburo Ibutani
- Kimiko Ikegami as Otone
- Takashi Sasano as Ryōsen Tezuka
- Yūko Kotegawa
- Shinobu Otsuka as Otsune
- Yuko Fueki
- Chihiro Otsuka as Aya
- Masahiko Tsugawa as Toko Fujita

== Reception ==
The Hidamari no Ki manga received the Shogakukan Manga Award in 1984 for general manga. The animated adaptation received the Excellence Prize in the animation category at the 2000 Japan Media Arts Festival.
