= Ayako Yoshitani =

Japanese actress (born 1991)

- 吉谷 彩子
- Born: September 26, 1991 (age 34); Chiba Prefecture, Japan
- Education: Nihon University
- Occupation: Actress
- Years active: 1996–present
- Agent: Tristone Entertainment Inc.
- Spouse: Ryutarou Akimoto (m. 2024)

Ayako Yoshitani (Japanese: 吉谷 彩子, Hepburn: Yoshitani Ayako; born 26 September 1991) is a Japanese actress. She has been an actress since her debut as a child actress in a television series at the age of four. Born in Chiba Prefecture. She belongs to Tristone Entertainment Inc.

== Career ==
Yoshitani was very shy as a child, and her mother, concerned about her shyness, enrolled her in a theater company, which led her to enter show business. She made her debut as a child actress at the age of four in the 1996 TBS special television series Family Affair, and gained attention for her role as Chieko in the 1997 Nippon TV television series Ryoko: Psychosomatic Physician. During her junior and senior high school years, she concentrated on her studies, but after entering Nihon University, she resumed her acting career, and at the age of 18, she played her first starring role in a film, Tenbatsu, released in 2010. In 2012, she challenged voice acting as Mikoto Urabe, the heroine of the TV anime Mysterious Girlfriend X. She also sang the opening and ending themes. In an interview with Katsutoshi Kitagawa, who produced the music for the show, Yoshitani said, "When I played Urabe, I tried to keep my voice as it was, rather than trying to do the voice of the anime. I tried to play Urabe as he is, not with the anime voice in mind." In a TV commercial for BizReach, a website that handles career changes, in which she has appeared since 2016, she played the role of a female employee and became a popular topic of conversation with the question, "Who is the beautiful woman in that commercial?". In 2017, after auditioning, she appeared as the youngest employee in TBS's Sunday theater Rikuoh starring Koji Yakusho, and in 2019, she gained attention when she appeared as a female pastry chef in TBS's Sunday theater La Grande Maison Tokyo starring Takuya Kimura. In 2020 she starred in TV Tokyo's television series Hal and Ao's Lunch Box, in which she played the lead role in a television series for the first time, along with Kai Inowaki.

== Personal life ==
On January 1, 2024, Yoshitani announced her marriage to actor Ryutarou Akimoto on her official social media account.

== Selected filmography ==
=== Film ===
Year	Title	Role	Notes	Ref.
2010	Tenbatsu	Yuki Koda	Lead role	
2010	Kimi ni Todoke	Ayako Kato		
2011	Gantz: Perfect Answer	Hitomi		
2015	Soredake / that's it	Amame Kichijo		
2019	The Seven Councils	Nishina		
2024	La Grande Maison Paris	Moe Matsui		

=== Television series ===
Year	Title	Role	Notes	Ref.
1996	Family Affair			
1997	Ryoko: Psychosomatic Physician	Chieko		
2001	Hōjō Tokimune	Noriko (Childhood)	Ep.3-5	
2002	Toshiie and Matsu	Sho (Childhood)	Ep.15-17	
2008	Shikaotoko Aoniyoshi	Shimizu	Ep.4-5	
2010	GeGeGe no Nyōbō	Masako	Ep.32	
2012	Umechan Sensei	Kyoko Nakaguro	Week 1 - Week 3	
2013	Yae's Sakura	Kikuko Yoda	Ep.25-28	
2017	Rikuoh	Misaki Nakashita		
2018	Ossan's Love	Hina Tanahashi	Ep.2	
2019	La Grande Maison Tokyo	Moe Matsui		
2020	The Pride of the Temp 2	Aki Fukuoka		
2020	Hal and Ao's Lunch Box	Haruna Kino (Haru)	Lead role	
2022	Maiagare!	Fuyuko Yura		
2023	Marriage is difficult for a ninja	Sayo Kazetomi		
2024	24 Hours of Love Security	Yuko Tsuda		
2024	Please be more unhappy than me	Keiko Natori, Keiko Aihara	Lead role	
2024	La Grande Maison Tokyo Special	Moe Matsui		

=== Animated TV series ===
- Mysterious Girlfriend X (2012) - Mikoto Urabe

=== Music videos ===
- When It Becomes Spring (2011) - Miwa
- Language of flowers (2016) - A.B.C-Z
