= Yoshinori Masakado =

Japanese actor and singer (born 1996)

- 正門 良規
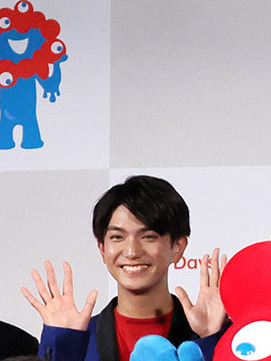
- Born: November 28, 1996 (age 29); Osaka, Japan
- Other names: Masakado, Massan
- Occupations: Actor; Singer; Idol
- Years active: 2011–present
- Agents: Starto Entertainment (Since 2024); Johnny & Associates (From 2011 to 2023)
- Musical career
- Genres: J-pop
- Instruments: Guitar, vocals
- Label: Universal Music Japan
- Member of: Ae! Group
- Website: Ae! Group (Starto Entertainment); Ae! Group (Universal Music Japan)

Yoshinori Masakado (Japanese: 正門 良規, Hepburn: Masakado Yoshinori; born November 28, 1996) is a member of Japanese boy band Ae! Group and actor. His nicknames are Masakado and Massan.

He was born in Osaka and belongs to Starto Entertainment.

== History ==
Masakado was born in Osaka in 1996 and aspired to enter the show business after watching the 2006 TV series and 2008 film Kurosagi and admiring the lead actor, Tomohisa Yamashita. His mother and sister sent his resume to Johnny & Associates when he was in his third year of junior high school. An open audition for Kansai Johnny's Jr. (trainees) was held at the Osaka-jō Hall performance of Yamashita's concert Asia Tour 2011 Super Good Super Bad, and Masakado was able to go on stage with Yamashita at this audition. He passed the audition and joined to the Johnny & Associates on April 3, 2011. His peers include Ren Nagase of King & Prince and Daigo Nishihata of Naniwa Danshi.

On February 18, 2019, he was selected as a member of the Ae! Group. In September of the same year, he began his acting career with a role in BS Nippon Corporation's TV series Love Sickness and the Bastard Gang. In 2020, he appeared in NHK's asadora Scarlet as the boyfriend of the protagonist's sister. In 2021, he played his first leading role on stage in Sen, Shoku, a play written by Shigeaki Kato of NEWS.

Masakado is also known for his guitar technique and is the guitarist of Ae! Group. He also held his first solo concert Yoshinori Masakado Solo Live Show with Kansai Johnny's Jr. at Osaka Shōchikuza during his pre-debut trainee period, which lasted about one month and 43 performances. It was unusual for a trainee to perform so many solo live shows before his debut.

On May 15, 2024, Ae! Group made their CD debut on Universal Music Japan.

== Personal relationships ==
Masakado is known for his close friendship with Ren Nagase and Daigo Nishihata, with whom he joined Johnny & Associates through the same audition. The three were once part of the trainee group "Ae Shonen (Aぇ少年)" and have maintained a strong personal bond even after moving on from their trainee days. They affectionately refer to their friendship as the "Dōki Manji-kai (同期卍会)" (roughly "同期 [同期 = peers] Manji Group), highlighting their close-knit relationship.

When Nagase starred in the film Yowamushi Pedal: Up the Road, he received a long, heartfelt email from Masakado sharing his impressions, which Nagase later mentioned as a particularly touching memory. In April 2024, during his radio program, Nagase excitedly announced to his fans, "My peer and best friend, a member of Ae! group, will be making their CD debut. Thank you!" expressing his joy as if it were his own achievement.

Further reflecting their close bond, in October of the same year, Nagase, Masakado, and Nishihata collaborated on Nagase's solo song "Shimi," included in King & Prince's sixth original album Re:ERA. For this track, Masakado contributed guitar and chorus, while Nishihata was involved in writing the lyrics and performing chorus vocals.

== Filmography ==
=== TV series ===
Year	Title	Role	Notes	Ref.
2019	Love Sickness and the Bastard Gang	Rintaro Yashiro		
2020	Scarlet	Masayuki Sameshima	Vol. 76 – 131	
2020	Younger Boyfriend	Kosuke Kawamura	Episode 9	
2020	Diver: Special Investigation Unit	Tetsuya Ueshima		
2021	The Men of the Wada Family	Shosei Mitsumura		
2022	Idol	Tomiyasu Sugai		
2022	Love Sickness and the Bastard Gang	Rintaro Yashiro	Season 2	
2023	Moving in Kyoto	Toshiya Omiya		
2025	Musashino Rondo	Ryūhei Agawa		

=== Films ===
Year	Title	Role	Notes	Ref.
2017	Kansai Johnny's Jr.'s Comedy Star is Born!	Daisuke Kinoshita		
2019	The Boys	Shogo		
2024	La Grande Maison Paris	Tasuku Kogure		
2026	Mr. Osomatsu: Project Slackers	Karamatsu Matsuno	Lead role	

== Stage ==
Year	Title	Role	Place	Ref.
2015	Boys The World's Dreams...Children Who Have Never Known War		Osaka Shochikuza	
2016	Johnnys' Future World		Umeda Arts Theater	
2017	Boys: Snow Falls on the Southern Islands		Osaka Shochikuza	
2018	Takizawa Kabuki 2018		Misono-za	
2018	Boys Who Run Tomorrow		Osaka Shochikuza	
2019	Takizawa Kabuki Zero		Minami-za	
2021	Sen, Shoku	Fukama (Leading role)	Panasonic Globe Theatre, Umeda Arts Theater	
2022	Vincent in Brixton	Vincent (Leading role)	Panasonic Globe Theatre, Umeda Arts Theater	
2024	Touching the Void	Joe Simpson (Leading role)	PARCO Theater, Kyoto-Gekijo	

== Other Activities ==
=== Variety Shows ===
- Saturday Plus (October 7, 2023 – MBS TV/TBS Television) – Host

=== Radio Programs ===
- Kansai Johnny's Jr.'s Bali Bali Sound -> Kambari! (May 1, 2018 – , FM Osaka) – Appears with Seiya Suezawa and Ken Kojima
- Children's Cheering! 4 Hour Radio (June 14, 2020, NHK Radio 1) – Main personality with Keita Richard Kusama
- Children's Cheering! 5 Hour Radio – After a Short Summer Vacation: To Everyone in Tough Times (September 13, 2020, NHK Radio 1) – main personality with Keita Richard Kusama
