= Atsushi Fukuda =

Japanese entrepreneur (born 1965)

- Born: July 26, 1965 (age 61); Takatsuki, Osaka Prefecture, Japan
- Education: Nihon University
- Occupations: entrepreneur; businessman
- Years active: 1988–present
- Known for: President of Speedy Inc. (2017-present); Former President and CEO of Starto Entertainment (2023–2025)
- Website: Speedy Inc. Official Website

Atsushi Fukuda (福田淳, born 26 July 1965) is a Japanese entrepreneur. He was born in Takatsuki, Osaka Prefecture, Japan. He is best known as the president of Speedy Inc. and former president of the entertainment company Starto Entertainment.

== Career ==
Fukuda was born and raised in Takatsuki, Osaka Prefecture. After graduating from Nihon University College of Art, he joined Tohokushinsha Film Corporation in 1988. When he first joined the company, he was working in the television advertisement production department, where he was involved in all aspects of video production from planning to delivery, and was in charge of production progression and management as production manager. However, then-President Banjiro Uemura took a liking to him, and in his second year he was assigned to the newly established satellite broadcasting department, where he remained for eight years until 1997, travelling the world, including Cannes, Milan and Hollywood, Los Angeles, as close aide to Uemura. In 1998, He changed his company to Sony Pictures in the United States, where he was involved in the launch of the TV stations themselves, including the satellite channels Animax and AXN, and became vice president in 2001. In 2007, he founded Sony Digital Entertainment as Intrapreneurship, he mainly engaged in branding and intellectual property management for content in the IT sector. In 2017, he established Speedy Inc. and worked on various businesses, including consultancy, agency and running an art gallery in Los Angeles.

Around 2015, Japanese actress Rena Nōnen wished to become independent from her then entertainment agency, but her agency refused to allow her independence, which led to trouble. This trouble was reported daily in the tabloid journalism as a scandal, resulting in her losing her job. In addition to this, she changed her name to her stage name Non, despite the name Rena Nonen being her real name, as her former agency reportedly insisted that she needed permission to use her name for entertainment purposes. Fukuda has been involved in Nonen's management since 2016 and has again got her a lot of work. She said that her schedule was full for the next two years. In an interview in 2019, Fukuda described the three-year absence of offers to Nonen for TV series as unusual. In fact, there are many offers for her from the field staff to appear in the series, but for some reason, the offers disappear after a few weeks. He said that such strange things often happen in the Japanese entertainment industry, where it is hard to tell whether it is pressure from someone or consideration for someone else. Fukuda said he had been in the US entertainment industry for a long time and did not understand such things. Fukuda's agent contract is a form of management agreement with Nonen's personal agency, a format used in Hollywood, Los Angeles, where the entertainment agency and the celebrity sign a fair contract.

In 2023, the sexual abuse of the late Johnny Kitagawa, founder of the Johnny & Associates, came to light. This led to the closure of Johnny's and the foundation of a new agency, Starto Entertainment. Fukuda became the new president of Starto. His appointment was triggered when Julie Keiko Fujishima, the former president of Johnny's, and Noriyuki Higashiyama, the president of Smile-Up (former Johnny's), and others came to Fukuda in October 2023 to ask his opinion on agent contracts with their celebrities. Fukuda was initially highly critical of Kitagawa's crimes, saying they were unforgivable on a global scale. And although he turned down the offer to become president as too much responsibility, he accepted it because he thought it would be a good opportunity to modernise the Japanese entertainment industry. Fukuda said that the Japanese entertainment industry's performance fee less than overseas due to the cost and effort of training and support systems, and does not allow freedom of transfer or independence. He also questioned the unfair practices of the Japanese entertainment industry, such as the fact that "the wishes of the agency take precedence over the policy of activities and the selection of offers" and that "even the existence of contracts, let alone their content, is unclear", and stated that he would like to make contracts more fair to celebrities and allow them to work freely.

Fukuda stepped down as president on June 27, 2025, upon the expiration of his term and in accordance with his own wishes.

== Charity activities ==
Fukuda joined an US film company Sony Pictures because he wanted to make people laugh and entertain them, but after the age of 40 he became interested in charity because he realised that there was a certain number of people who were not laughing or did not have the luxury of laughing. He became interested in non-profit organizations activities and is currently serves on the president of Achante Mama, an NPO that supports children in Africa, and an auditor of Fathering Japan, a NPO whose philosophy is to enjoy being a father. He did the Ice Bucket Challenge in August 2014. The challenge was not well known in Japan at the time, so he did it in English, but then "END ALS", a Japanese ALS support group, saw the video of it and asked Fukuda to spread the challenge in Japan. This triggered Hiroshi Mikitani, president of Rakuten, baseball critic Atsuya Furuta, author Hirotada Ototake, and others to gather right under Tokyo Tower for an Ice Bucket Challenge event, which was widely reported in Japan. He also grows blue Java banana on his "Speedy farm" in Nanjō, Okinawa Prefecture, which he donates to the Nanjo Council of Social Welfare to deliver his produce to children.

== Awards ==
- Nikkei Web Company "Reading the 21st Century! 51 IT key persons" (2001)

== Books ==
- The Voice of the Town is a Lie (2006, Satemaga) ISBN 978-4901867191
- This is fine, I'm 14 years old (2008, Kodansha) ISBN 978-4062150613
- You don't think you can make money with SNS, do you? (2017, Shogakukan) ISBN 978-4093885522
- The Corona Era of Swissy Living (2021, Koryosha Shoten, co-authored with Naoki Sakai) ISBN 978-4771110427
- Streetwise City 2022 (2021, Koryosha Shoten) ISBN 978-4771110663
- What You Like, You Will Like (2024, Speedy Books) ISBN 978-4771110700
