= Do S Deka =

2015 Japanese drama TV series

- Genre: Drama
- Created by: Yoshi Nanao
- Written by: Izumi Kawasaki; Yoshi Nanao
- Directed by: Satoru Nakajima
- Starring: Mikako Tabe; Tadayoshi Okura
- Ending theme: Tsuyoku Tsuyoku Tsuyoku by Kanjani Eight
- Country of origin: Japan
- Original language: Japanese
- No. of series: 1
- No. of episodes: 11

Production
- Producer: Masahiro Mori
- Running time: 54 minutes
- Production companies: Kouwa International Co., Ltd.

Original release
- Network: NTV
- Release: 11 April – 20 June 2015

Do S Deka (ドS刑事; English title "Ms. Sadistic Detective") is a Japanese television drama series based on the humorous mystery novel by Yoshi Nanao. It premiered on NTV on 11 April 2015, starring Mikako Tabe and Tadayoshi Okura in the lead role. It received the viewership rating of 9.3% on average.

== Cast ==
- Mikako Tabe as Maya Kuroi, a detective sergeant
- Tadayoshi Okura as Shūsuke Daikanyama, a detective constable and Maya's colleague
- Yō Yoshida as Fujiko Shirogane, a detective superintendent and Maya's confronting supervisor
- Hikaru Yaotome as Sōichirō Hamada, a detective constable who wants to be abused by Maya
- Yasuhi Nakamura as Masanobu Nakane, a detective constable
- Masanobu Katsumura as Tsuneo Arisugawa, a detective inspector
- Masatō Ibu as Tokuji Kondō, a veteran detective sergeant

== Episodes ==
No.	Title	Directed by	Original release date	Ratings (%)
1	"攻撃系女子とピュア巡査バディの痛快ポリス・コメディー!潜入捜査で女装しなさい"	Satoru Nakajima	April 11, 2015	12.7
2	"連続放火殺人!だけど合コンに潜入しなさい!?爆走ポリス・コメディ!"	Satoru Nakajima	April 18, 2015	8.0
3	"恐怖の連続放火にマヤの怒り爆発!恨みの連鎖の謎を解く涙のドS攻撃!"	Satoru Nakajima	April 25, 2015	11.0
4	"囚われの少女は超ドS!?マヤvsリトルマヤ究極の対決疑惑の誘拐事件!"	Taisuke Kawamura	May 2, 2015	9.0
5	"サプライズパーティ殺人事件!マヤも逆上・横暴上司に復讐したのは誰だ"	Yōichi Matsunaga	May 9, 2015	11.1
6	"女子高生殺人に仕組まれた罠にマヤ怒りの法廷乱入!もう女装はイヤです"	Taisuke Kawamura	May 16, 2015	10.1
7	"代官さまがエイリアンに誘拐?マヤ大激怒・インチキUFOを撃ち落とせ"	Satoru Nakajima	May 23, 2015	7.2
8	"卑劣な連続爆弾魔を追え!恩師への裏切りは許さない人情刑事の涙の理由"	Yōichi Matsunaga	May 30, 2015	7.2
9	"コスプレ少女の悲しい叫び・孤独な心につけ込む犯罪に怒りのムチ炸裂!"	Satoru Nakajima	June 6, 2015	8.8
10	"え!マヤがお見合い!?ついに最終章へ・連続殺人の魔の手が代官山家に!"	Nobuyoshi Yamada	June 13, 2015	8.4
11	"遂に最終回・最大の敵がマヤを監禁大ピンチ!最後のバッカじゃないの"	Satoru Nakajima	June 20, 2015	8.8

Preceded by Gakkō no Kaidan (10 January 2015 - 14 March 2015)	NTV Saturday Dramas; Saturdays 21:00 - 21:54 (JST)	Succeeded by Dokonjō Gaeru (July 2015 - )
