= Ryosuke Hashimoto =

Japanese singer (born 1993)

- Also known as: Hasshi (nickname)
- Born: July 15, 1993 (age 33); Chiba Prefecture, Japan
- Genres: J-pop, pop
- Occupation: Singer
- Years active: 2004–present
- Label: Pony Canyon

Ryosuke Hashimoto (橋本 良亮, Hashimoto Ryōsuke; born July 15, 1993 in Chiba Prefecture, Japan) is a Japanese singer managed by the male idol talent agency Johnny and Associates. He is a member of the boyband A.B.C-Z.

== Career ==
On September 8, 2004, having passed an audition for Johnny's Jr., Ryosuke Hashimoto became a Johnny's trainee. In the summer of 2005, he was selected as a member of Johnny's Jr. unit J.J. Express. In 2008, he was selected to form the group TOP3 together with Yuma Sanada and Yuki Nozawa.

On August 29, 2008, Ryosuke Hashimoto was added to the Johnny's Jr. group A.B.C., renamed to A.B.C-Z when he joined.

In early 2009, the entertainment magazine Myojo named Ryosuke Hashimoto the number one "Jr. I Would Like to Be My Boyfriend". He also won the first place in the "Best Looking" category and the second place as the one "I Would Like to Kiss".

On February 1, 2012, Ryosuke's group A.B.C-Z had a major debut with a DVD titled Za ABC ~5stars~.

In 2012, Ryosuke acted in a television series titled Sprout, broadcast starting July 7 on NTV.

Since April 6, 2013, he is appearing in a television drama series called Bad Boys J.

== Personal life ==
On July 31, 2008, the September issue of the tabloid magazine BUBKA published a paparazzi article about Ryosuke Hashimoto spotted at the cinema with Kanna Arihara from the girl group Cute. They went to see the movie Hana Yori Dango: Final. The publication might become the reason for Kanna's disappearance from Cute's activities in early 2009 and her subsequent retirement from the entertainment industry to "return to the life of a normal girl". Cute fans thought that she was pressured to leave by her talent agency. According to a women's weekly tabloid magazine reporter, the publication itself would not lead to Kanna's retirement, but she continued to date Ryosuke in secret after that. Instead of being punished after the scoop in BUBKA as rumors expected, on August 29, 2008, Ryosuke Hashimoto was added to the Johnny's Jr. group A.B.C., renamed to A.B.C-Z when he joined.

== Johnny's Jr. groups ==
- J.J. Express
- TOP3
- A.B.C-Z

== Solo Song ==
- Stay with me (A.B.Sea Market)
- Crazy about you (ABC Star Line)
- Love To Love You (5 Performer-Z)
- 秘密の愛
- DANCE
- hazy love
- One by One

== Solo concert ==
- A.B.C-Z Ha"SS"hy Concert (2015)
- ハシツアーズ 〜もうかわいいなんて言わせない〜 (2016)
- 橋本ソロ充観とく？～りょうちゃんとぱりぴ～ (2017)

== Filmography ==
=== Variety shows ===
- Shounen Club (ザ少年倶楽部) (2004–)
- Hyakushiki ~Hyaku de Shiru Hitotsu no Chishiki~ (百識〜百で知るひとつの知識〜) (October 2007 – March 2008, Fuji TV)
- ABChanZoo 「えびチャンズ」(2013.07.21 – present)
- Derusata (With Tsukada Ryoichi, 2016–present)

=== TV dramas ===
- Sprout (スプラウト) (July 7, 2012 – September 29, 2012, Nippon Television) as Naoharu Takigawa
- Bad Boys J (BAD BOYS J) (April 6, 2013–present, Nippon Television) as Hiro
- Magical Boy Cherry's (June 21 – September 27, 2014, TV Tokyo) as Tetsu Dogami
- Iyashiya Kiriko no Yakusoku (August 3 – September 25, 2015, Fuji TV) as Haruki Aoi

=== Movie ===
- Bad Boys J The Movie (2013)
- The 47 Ronin in Debt (2019), Takebayashi Takashige

=== Stage Play ===
- ルードウィヒ・B (2014)
- Coin Locker Babies (2016 & 2018)
- Death Trap (2017)
- Mitsubachi to Enrai (2018)
- Every Good Boy Deserves Favour (2019)
- The Dinner Table Detective (2025) Kyoichiro Kazamatsuri
- Joseph and the Amazing Technicolor Dreamcoat (2026) - The Pharaoh

=== Commercials ===
- Nissin Range Spa-ō (日清レンジSpa王) by Nissin Food Products Co., Ltd. (2009)

== Awards and recognitions ==
Myojo
2009

- Most Wanted as a Boyfriend Jr. (恋人にしたいJr.): 1st place
- Best Looking (いちばん美形): 1st place
- Most Desirable to Kiss (キスしてみたい): 2nd place
