= Kamigata Boyz =

Kamigata Boyz (stylized in all caps) is an entertainment group collaboration from Starto Entertainment Kansai region groups Super Eight, West. and Naniwa Danshi, debuted in 2024.

== Overview ==
Super Eight's Tadayoshi Okura, who has been working as a producer for the Kansai trainees since 2018, had an idea to gather all artists from Kansai. That Idea came to fruition with the Dream Island concerts.

Starting on July 28, 2020, groups and trainees from the Kansai region got together for the Johnny's DREAM IsLAND 2020→2025 non-audience live stream concerts, due to the COVID-19 pandemic. Super Eight, West. and Naniwa Danshi, then still a part of the trainees, along with other Kansai Jr. groups, had individual performances that lasted until August 25. It was there where the unit's idea was born.

The unit's formation announcement was a surprise on April 29, 2024. The same day, an official website was opened, with the photo of all of the members of the 3 collaborating groups dressed in black, together with a teaser video. "#KAMIGATA_BOYZ" and "#KamigataBoys" dominated the 1st and 2nd place in the trends.

Their debut limited-edition single, "Musekinin de Eejanaika LOVE" was released in digital form on May 3, under the Storm Labels division Infinity Records, Super Eight's label.

== Discography ==
=== Digital singles ===
#	Release date	Title	Sales format	Top rank		Ref.
#	Release date	Title	Sales format	Oricon	Billboard	Ref.
1	May 3, 2024	Musekinin de Eejanaika LOVE	Digital download	TBA		
2	September 18, 2024	Sekai o Akaruku Terashimashou (世界を明るく照らしましょう)	Digital download	TBA		
