= Ryutarou Akimoto =

Japanese actor (born 1995)

- 秋元 龍太朗
- Born: March 13, 1995 (age 30); Tokyo, Japan
- Occupation: Actor
- Years active: 2009–present
- Label: Evergreen Entertainment
- Spouse: Ayako Yoshitani (m. 2024)
- Website: akimotoryutarou.com

Ryutarou Akimoto (秋元 龍太朗, Akimoto Ryūtarō; born March 13, 1995) is a Japanese actor and model. He is part of Evergreen Entertainment and has appeared several times in Japanese movies and TV dramas. He received a Junon Super Boy Photogenic Award.

== Personal life ==
Akimoto and Yoshitani announced their marriage on January 1, 2024, in a post on Yoshitani's Instagram account.

== Filmography ==
=== TV dramas ===
- Challenged (2010) as Genki Ito
- Dohyo Girl (2010) as Shigeo Ikebe
- Challenged - Graduation (TV Movies) (2011) as Genki Ito
- High School Restaurant (2011) as Shota Tamura (Second Year Student)
- Ouran High School Host Club (2011) as Arai
- Kamen Rider Fourze (2011) as Soushi Matoyama (Perseus Zodiarts)

=== Movies ===
- Bokutachi no Play Ball (2010) as Koichi
- Kamen Rider Fourze the Movie: Space, Here We Come! (2012) as Soushi Matoyama (Perseus Zodiarts)

=== Theatrical and other performances ===
- Junon Super Boy Contest Vol.21 Ryutaro Akimoto (2009)
- Amadanshi - Amadan (2011)
- Evergreen Entertainment Show 2011 Vol.2 (2011)

=== Awards and nominations ===
- Junon Super Boy contest - Photogenic Award (2009)
