= Torikizoku =

Japanese restaurant company

- Headquarters in Osaka, Japan
- Native name: 鳥貴族
- Traded as: TYO: 3193
- Industry: Restaurant
- Founded: 19 September 1986
- Founder: Tadashi Okura
- Headquarters: Osaka, Japan
- Number of locations: 725 (Torikizoku) 1,194 (Related companies included) (July 2026)
- Area served: World
- Products: Yakitori
- Services: Izakaya

Torikizoku (Japanese: 鳥貴族, lit. 'chicken aristocrat') is a Japanese izakaya chain established in 1985 by Tadashi Okura, father of Tadayoshi Okura. As of 2026, there are 700 Torikizoku branches in the world. Torikizoku and its related companies are under the Eternal Hospitality Group.

== Name ==
Logo of Torikizoku, with the text written in sigillary script

According to Tadashi Okura, the name "Torikizoku" originated from "chicken" (鳥, Tori) and "aristocrat" (貴族, Kizoku), aiming to treat customers like an aristocrat. Tadashi also used the unique name to attract female customers, breaking an impression that izakaya bars are for the elderly people. The logo's "∞" sign means "eternal service" (イターナルサービス). Tadashi denied the relationship between the sign and "Kanjani Eight" (関ジャニ∞(エイト)), the former name of his son's group currently known as Super Eight. The seal script-like style of "鳥貴族" has been used from its establishment.

== Management ==
Torikizoku is known for its affordable price. Each dishes' price is the same. At the bar's establishment in 1985, the price was 280 yen. The most recent increase is 370 yen to 390 yen on 10 March 2025. According to Tadashi Okura, customers could benefit from the same price by keeping the budget low,allowing them easier to find suitable combinations.

The chain focuses on yakitori, grilled chicken on a skewer. All of Torikizoku's bars in Japan use chicken from Japan. Most items are chicken dishes, while other skewer dishes are kept to a minimum. Bars in Japan would also hire part-time staff to prepare meals in morning before they open at night. To reduce training cost, the chain uses electric grills (instead of traditional charcoal grills), while introducing Kitchen Display Systems (KDS) to increase the speed of distributing food. Bars choose non-ground floors, such as basement or second floor or above, to lower rent. The chain also retains the practice of otoshi (Note: Japanese: お通し, a appetiser without obvious notify but still charges. It is a standard practice across Japanese izakaya.), to reduce customers' surprise.

As of 2024, 6 in 10 Torikizoku bars are managed by the chain directly, while others are franchise stores. Tadashi Okura wanted all his bars directly managed to maintain quality. Started from 2010, Torikizoku only accepts franchising from the chain's staff or stores that have been franchised before 2010.

== Histroy ==
Tadashi Okura established his first Torikizoku bar near Shuntokumichi Station in Higashiōsaka, Osaka, Japan, in September 1985, at the age of 25. It was initially near its bankruptcy once, but was revived after adopting a fixed-price strategy, and the brand soon made a name for itself.In 1986, Okura established Eternal Services (株式会社イターナルサービス).

In 2005, Torikizoku opened its first bar in Tokyo. By this time, Torikizoku already had 65 bars in Osaka. By 2007, Torikizoku had 82 bars in Japan, with a turnover of 4.5 billion yen. In November 2010, Torikizoku relocated its head office from Sakuragawa to Tachiba. Torikizoku had 198 bars in that year. It later surpassed 200 bars in 2011.

On 10 July 2014, Torikizoku made its initial public offering in JASDAQ. Its issue price (Note: 公開価格) on the day was 6,180 yen. In 2015 and 2016, the company was listed on the Second Section and First Section of the Tokyo Stock Exchange respectively.

In April 2020, Torikizoku temporarily closed 394 bars in response to the COVID-19 pandemic in Japan. Torikizoku later announced that the company would be restructured into a holding company named "Torikizoku Holdings" (株式会社鳥貴族ホールディングス). On 22 September 2023, Torikizoku Holdings announced the compan to rename to "Eternal Hospitality Group" (エターナルホスピタリティグループ). it later gained approved at the shareholders' meeting in October.

In June 2020, Torikizoku opened a pilot outlet called "Ōkura-ya", aimed at enabling staff to start their own businesses. In August 2021, Torikizoku Holdings opened a new chicken burger restaurant called "TORIKI BURGER". In 2022, Torikizoku acquired "Yakitori Daikichi" (やきとり大吉) from "Daikichi System" (ダイキチシステム).

=== Overseas market ===
Torikizoku announced its intention of opening oversea bars, including those in the United States. The chain established its first bar in Los Angeles, United States in April 2023. In 2024, Torikizoku established its first bar in Hong Kong with Four Seas Group using its franchising model. In the same year, the chain established its first bar in Taipei, Taiwan with Dachan Food In 2025, the first bar in China was established in Shanghai. The first bars in Singapore and Vietnam respectively were established in 2026.
