= Crying 100 Times: Every Raindrop Falls =

- Directed by: Ryūichi Hiroki
- Screenplay by: Izumi Takahashi
- Based on: novel 100-kai Naku Koto by Kou Nakamura
- Produced by: Hitoshi Matsumoto; Yasushi Udagawa
- Starring: Tadayoshi Okura; Mirei Kiritani
- Cinematography: Atsuhiro Nabeshima
- Music by: Tadashi Ueda
- Release date: June 22, 2013 (Japan)
- Running time: 116 minutes
- Country: Japan
- Language: Japanese

Crying 100 Times: Every Raindrop Falls (Japanese: 100回泣くこと, Hepburn: 100-kai Naku Koto) is a 2013 Japanese romance drama film based on Kou Nakamura's novel of the same name. Directed by Ryūichi Hiroki, it stars Tadayoshi Okura and Mirei Kiritani.

== Plot ==
Shuichi Fuji lost the last year of his memory after a motorcycle accident four years ago. One day, he meets Yoshimi Sawamura at a friend's wedding and falls in love with her. Shuichi wants to marry her but they decide to first live together. But soon Yoshimi becomes sick.

== Cast ==
- Tadayoshi Okura as Shuichi Fuji
- Mirei Kiritani as Yoshimi Sawamura
- Rie Tomosaka as Natsuko Nakamura
- Shugo Oshinari as Keisuke Muto
- Haru as Keiko Ogawa
- Jun Murakami as Nagumo
- Yoshiko Miyazaki as Kazuyo Fuji
- Ren Osugi as Yasuhiko Sawamura
