= 7 Men Samurai =

Japanese boy band

- Origin: Japan
- Years active: March 5th 2018 - 2025
- Past members: Reia Nakamura; Rinne Sugeta; Katsuki Motodaka; Taikō Sasaki; Taiki Konno; Rei Yabana

7 Men Samurai (7 MEN 侍) was a Japanese boy band under the trainee area of Starto Entertainment. Originally produced by Johnnys' Island Company, a division of Tokyo-based talent agency Johnny & Associates, they were created on February 26, 2018, by Johnny Kitagawa, and named after Akira Kurosawa's 1954 film Seven Samurai. They are known for their dance acumen, band-style performances, and rock covers/remixes of J-Pop songs from the older Johnnys' talent catalog, including "Cinderella Girl" and "Samurai."

In addition to appearing regularly as a group in the bi-monthly music and variety show The Shōnen Club (NHK), they were one of eight groups featured on the official Johnnys' Junior YouTube Channel, and have posted content every Friday since August 2019. They were also active on the Johnnys' official video site Island TV, where they shared vlog-style behind-the-scenes recaps of work and engagements, as well as humorous vignettes, outtakes and original skits.

Members appeared on Japanese variety TV programs, such as the quiz show Torinikutte Nan no Nikui!? (TV Asahi) and the sports competition series Honoo no Taiikutai TV (TBS) for which member Rinne Sugeta has been an official part of the in-show "Johnny's Track-and-Field Team" coached by KAT-TUN's Tatsuya Ueda. Individual members have also been cast in starring and supporting roles for stage and in scripted television dramas.

The group ceased to exist in February 2025, after Starto reorganized the Junior area, with the members divided into 2 new groups.

== Members ==
- Reia Nakamura (中村嶺亜)
- Rinne Sugeta (菅田琳寧)
- Katsuki Motodaka (本髙克樹)
- Taikō Sasaki (佐々木大光)
- Taiki Konno (今野大輝)
- Rei Yabana (矢花黎)

== Music ==
On May 1, 2020, it was announced that they would be receiving their first original song from Johnnys' Island CEO Hideaki Takizawa during a surprise prank video uploaded as one of their YouTube contents. The song had been intended for their solo segment during the annual Johnnys' Ginza spring talent showcase, all of which was cancelled due to the Covid-19 pandemic.

The song, called "Samu-dama" (サムダマ), was finally performed in August 2020, during a 2 day/5 show solo segment the group hosted as part of the larger Summer Paradise 2020 livestreamed music festival from Johnny & Associates for the website Johnny's Net Online (JNO). The song is a hard rock number with the title being a portmanteau of the Japanese words for "samurai spirit," or samurai damashii (侍魂). On September 11, 2020, a self-shot Studio Live music video for SAMU-DAMA was uploaded to the Johnnys' Junior YouTube channel, along with a separate making-of vignette and an encore performance covering Tokio's 2000 up-tempo rock song "Jumbo".

A second original song, "Siren" (サイレン) was debuted on November 28, 2020, as part of the boys' solo set within the Johnnys' Jr. Island FES music festival, performed alongside additional original songs for fellow Johnnys' Junior performers HiHi Jets and Jr.SP. A third, "SHOUT," premiered during the JOHNNYS' IsLAND THE NEW WORLD new year showcase in January 2022.

== Live Concerts ==
List of live performances
Concert Name	Dates	Total Performances	Venue
Johnnys' Ginza 2019 Tokyo Experience	May 27 ~ June 2, 2019	9	Theatre Crea
Papa/Mama/Ichiban Hadaka-no-Shonen Summer Festival	August 3 ~ 25, 2019	33	Ex Theater Roppongi
Summer Paradise 2020	August 11 ~ 12, 2020	5	Tokyo Dome City Hall
Johnnys' Jr. Island FES	November 28, 2020	1	Saitama Super Arena
Johnnys' Ginza 2021	May 10 ~ 16, 2021	10	Theatre Crea
Summer Station LIVE THE FUTURE	July 25 ~ August 5, 2021	17	EX Theater Roppongi
JOHNNYS' Experience	May 24 ~ June 5, 2022	20	The Globe Tokyo
Summer Station LIVE Boys for the futures	August 6 ~ August 18, 2022	20	EX Theater Roppongi
