= A.B.C-Z =

Japanese boy band

A.B.C.-Z
- Origin: Tokyo, Japan
- Genre: Pop
- Years active: 2005–present
- Label: Pony Canyon
- Members: Ryosuke Hashimoto; Shota Totsuka; Koichi Goseki; Ryoichi Tsukada
- Past members: Fumito Kawai
- Website: abcz.ponycanyon.co.jp

A.B.C-Z (エー.ビー.シー-ズィー, ee.bii.shii.zii) is a five-member Japanese boy band under Starto Entertainment. The group's former name was A.B.C., which stands for Acrobat Boys Club. It was changed to A.B.C-Z after Ryosuke Hashimoto was moved to the group from J.J.Express in 2008. Due to the Japanese pronunciations of their name, the fans usually refer to them as "Ebi".

The group was a former Johnny's Jr. unit. They debuted February 1, 2012, with their DVD Za ABC ~5 Stars~.

== History ==
=== 2001–2008: As A.B.C. ===
Members:

- Koichi Goseki
- Shota Totsuka
- Ryoichi Tsukada
- Fumito Kawai

In 2002 they became A.B.C. with Yoshikazu Toshin.

=== 2008–2011: A.B.C-Z pre-debut ===
In the Summer of 2008, it was announced that Ryosuke Hashimoto, who was a member of J.J.Express, would join A.B.C., thus the group name changed to A.B.C-Z, their name is an acronym for "Acrobatics Boys Club Z" the Z symbolizing the last member coming into the group and completing them like Z completes the alphabet. Right after that, they held a concert, along with Kis-My-Ft2.

In May 2010 they were allowed to hold their concert at Theater Crea in Tokyo. It was also the first time they produced their concert. They had their solo live from May 11 to 19 and then other units from Johnny's Jr. would take part in, and hold four different kinds of the show in total until May 31.

On July 23, 2011, during the PLAYZONE'11 musical, Fumito Kawai broke his left leg, causing him not to be able to appear for the rest of the show. After PLAYZONE'11 A.B.C-Z was scheduled to be in the stage play Shonentachi Koushi Naki Rougoku. Johnny H. Kitagawa was at the opening of this show and revealed a new group of seven, ABC-xyZ, centered on the already existing four-member group A.B.C-Z. He also hinted that things could get going by 2012, but for that Kawai needs to get better first.

On November 6, 2011, they held their first one-man concert at Tokyo's Yoyogi National Stadium for 26,000 fans. They also announced that in February of the following year they would be hosting a play, titled "ABC-za Star Kouen", at Nissay Theater in Tokyo. Johnny H. Kitagawa commented that they may debut the next year.

On December 9, 2011, A.B.C-Z held a press conference for their upcoming stage play "ABC-za Star Kouen". They also announced that they would be debuting in 2012 with a DVD. This would make them the first Johnny's to do so. They hope to release the DVD before the opening of their stage play on February 4. It is said that the DVD would be released under Johnny's Entertainment. By the end of December the release date, February 1, 2012, was then made public, along with the content of the DVD.

=== 2012–2018: Debut and 5th anniversary ===
A.B.C-Z made their debut in 31 January at Shibuya AX which gathered 15.000 fans. Their DVD debut got number 1 in Oricon weekly ranking. In July, their variety show "ABChanZoo" starts broadcasting in TV Tokyo.

In June 2014, the first drama of A.B.C-Z members "Magical Boy Cherry's" starts broadcasting in TV Tokyo.

In September 2015, A.B.C-Z released their first single "Moonlight Walker" which got number 1 in Oricon weekly ranking.

Four years after their debut, in July 2016 A.B.C-Z established their official Fan Club

A.B.C-Z celebrated 5th anniversary of the group's debut in 2017 by releasing the single "Reboot!!!" and an album "5 Performer-z", followed by the "A.B.C-Z 5Stars 5Years Tour".

In 2018 A.B.C-Z celebrated their 10th year of the group formation and did a collaboration event with amusement park "Tokyo Joypolis", the event was called "A.B.C-Z 5stars CIRCUS in JOYPOLIS". The group also released a new single "JOYしたいキモチ" for this collaboration event.

=== 2019 ===
A.B.C-Z held their last concert of the Love Battle Tour in Yokohama Arena on January 8, they announced a new single "Black Sugar" which will be released on March 28. They also announced a new drama "Our Showtime" that will be airing in Nagoya TV on April, the theme song for the drama is A.B.C-Z song "Showtime" from the single "Black Sugar".

The group released their 6th album on August 7 "Going With Zephyr", followed by the tour with the same title as their album. Their collaboration event with the amusement park Tokyo Joypolis continued for the second year in a row.

=== 2023 ===
On 22 September 2023, member Fumito Kawai announced he would leave the group to prepare himself to become a better MC. His plan is to continue in Johnny's his solo career. He will be leaving on 21 December.

== Members ==
=== Current members ===
- Ryosuke Hashimoto - 橋本良亮 (born July 15, 1993 - red)
- Shota Totsuka - 戸塚祥太 (born November 13, 1986 - pink)
- Ryoichi Tsukada - 塚田僚一 (born December 10, 1986 - yellow)
- Koichi Goseki - 五関晃一 (born June 17, 1985 - blue)

=== Past member ===
- Fumito Kawai - 河合郁人 (born October 20, 1987 - violet) (until 21 December 2023)

== Discography ==
A.B.C-Z discography
- Studio albums: 10
- Extended plays: 3
- Compilation albums: 1
- Singles: 15

=== Studio albums ===
Title	Album details	Peak chart positions		Sales
Title	Album details	JPN	JPN Comb (Note: The Oricon Combined Albums Chart was established on December 24, 2018.)	Sales
From ABC to Z	Released: March 12, 2014; Label: Pony Canyon	4	—	JPN: 46,240
A.B.Sea Market	Released: May 13, 2015; Label: Pony Canyon	1	—	JPN: 51,730
ABC Star Line	Released: July 20, 2016; Label: Pony Canyon	3	—	JPN: 33,164
5 Performer-Z	Released: June 21, 2017; Label: Pony Canyon	2	—	JPN: 41,065
VS 5	Released: May 23, 2018; Label: Pony Canyon	4	—	JPN: 35,135
Going with Zephyr	Released: August 7, 2019; Label: Pony Canyon	2	2	JPN: 36,656
Continue?	Released: September 16, 2020; Label: Pony Canyon	4	5	JPN: 30,016
F.O.R – Kawariyuku Jidai no Naka de, Kagayaku Kimi to Odoritai. (F.O.R-変わりゆく時代の中で、輝く君と踊りたい。)	Released: August 21, 2024; Label: Pony Canyon	4	4	JPN: 28,936
Crazy Romantic!	Released: October 29, 2025; Label: Pony Canyon	5	—	JPN: 28,527
The Way of L.O.V-E	Released: September 30, 2026; Label: Pony Canyon	3	—	JPN: 27,680
"—" denotes a recording that did not chart or was not released in that territory.

=== Compilation albums ===
Title	Album details	Peak chart positions		Sales
Title	Album details	JPN	JPN Comb	Sales
Best of ABC-Z	Released: February 1, 2022; Label: Pony Canyon	1	1	JPN: 56,544

=== Extended plays ===
Title	EP details	Peak chart positions		Sales
Title	EP details	JPN	JPN Comb	Sales
5 Stars	Released: November 29, 2023; Label: Pony Canyon	2	2	JPN: 33,954
Romantic!	Released: June 25, 2025; Label: Pony Canyon	3	4	JPN: 24,876
The Way	Released: July 15, 2026; Label: Pony Canyon	3	—	JPN: 23,896

=== Singles ===
Title	Year	Peak chart positions		Album
Title	Year	JPN	JPN Comb (Note: The Oricon Combined Singles Chart was established on December 24, 2018.)	Album
"Moonlight Walker"	2015	1	—	ABC Star Line
"Take a '5'Train"	2016	3	—	ABC Star Line
"Reboot!!!"	2017	1	—	5 Performer-Z
"Shuuden wo Koete (Christmas Night) / Bounenkai! Bou! Nen! Kai!" (終電を超えて〜Christmas Night / 忘年会! BOU! NEN! KAI!)	2017	2	—	VS 5
"Joy Shitai Kimochi" (JOYしたいキモチ)	2018	1	—	Going with Zephyr
"Black Sugar"	2019	3	3	Going with Zephyr
"Dan Dan Dance!!"	2019	2	3	Continue?
"Cheat Time" (チートタイム)	2020	2	3	Continue?
"Ganbare, Tomoyo!" (頑張れ、友よ!)	2020	2	4	Best of ABC-Z
"Nothin' but Funky"	2021	2	4	Best of ABC-Z
"Natsu to Kimi no Uta" (夏と君のうた)	2021	2	4	Best of ABC-Z
"Graceful Runner"	2022	2	4	Non-album singles
"#IMA"	2022	2	4	Non-album singles
"Kimi Janakya Dame Nanda" (君じゃなきゃだめなんだ)	2024	4	9	Non-album singles
"Hirihiri Sasete" (ヒリヒリさせて)	2024	2	4	Non-album singles
"—" denotes a recording that did not chart or was not released in that territory.

=== Video releases ===
==== Video singles ====
Title	Album details	Peak chart positions
Title	Album details	JPN DVD
Za ABC: 5stars	Released: February 1, 2012; Label: Pony Canyon	1
Zutto Love (ずっとLOVE)	Released: September 12, 2012; Label: Pony Canyon	1
Twinkle Twinkle A.B.C-Z	Released: March 6, 2013; Label: Pony Canyon	2
Walking on Clouds	Released: July 10, 2013; Label: Pony Canyon	1
Never My Love	Released: November 20, 2013; Label: Pony Canyon	2
Legend Story	Released: July 9, 2014; Label: Pony Canyon	1
Space Travelers	Released: January 7, 2015; Label: Pony Canyon	1
Hana Kotoba (花言葉)	Released: March 16, 2016; Label: Pony Canyon	2

==== Live videos ====
Title	Album details	Peak chart positions
Title	Album details	JPN DVD
ABC Za Hoshi (Star) Gekijou (ABC座 星(スター)劇場)	Released: July 4, 2012; Label: Pony Canyon	1
Johnny's Dome Theater (Summary2012) A.B.C-Z	Released: January 16, 2013; Label: Pony Canyon	5
A.B.C-Z 2013 Twinkle×2 Star Tour	Released: October 16, 2013; Label: Pony Canyon	5
ABC Za 2013 Johnny's Densetsu (The Digest) (ABC座2013 ジャニーズ伝説(The Digest))	Released: June 25, 2014; Label: Pony Canyon	7
Summer Concert 2014 A.B.C-Z★"Legend"	Released: March 11, 2015; Label: Pony Canyon	7
A.B.C-Z Early Summer Concert	Released: October 28, 2015; Label: Pony Canyon	3
A.B.C-Z Star Line Travel Concert	Released: December 7, 2016; Label: Pony Canyon	5
ABC Za 2016 Kabushikigaisha Ouenya!! (Oh&Yeah!!) (ABC座2016 株式会社応援屋!! 〜OH&YEAH!!〜)	Released: March 15, 2017; Label: Pony Canyon	6
A.B.C-Z 5Stars 5Years Tour	Released: February 7, 2018; Label: Pony Canyon	2
ABC Za Johnny's Densetsu 2017 (ABC座 ジャニーズ伝説2017)	Released: August 28, 2018; Label: Pony Canyon	6
A.B.C-Z 2018 Love Battle Tour	Released: January 30, 2019; Label: Pony Canyon	3
A.B.C-Z Concert Tour 2019 Going with Zephyr	Released: December 25, 2019; Label: Pony Canyon	10
A.B.C-Z 1st Christmas Concert 2020 Continue?	Released: June 23, 2021; Label: Pony Canyon	8
A.B.C-Z 2021 But FanKey Tour	Released: April 20, 2022; Label: Pony Canyon	4
A.B.C-Z 10th Anniversary Tour 2022 ABCXYZ	Released: February 22, 2023; Label: Pony Canyon	3

== Group activities ==
=== Variety shows ===
- Shounen Club 「ザ少年倶楽部」(2008–present)
- J Journeys A.B.C-Z Working Holiday [J'J A.B.C-Z オーストラリア縦断 資金0円ワーホリの旅] (2013.04.01 - 06.17)
- ABChanZoo 「えびチャンズ」(2013.07.21 - present)

=== Drama ===
- Magical Boy Cherry's「魔法☆男子チェリーズ」(2014.06.21 - 09.21)

=== Radio ===
- A.B.C-Z Go!Go!5 (FM NACK5) (2015.04 - present)
- A.B.C-Z今夜はJ's倶楽部 (NHK) (2016.08 - present)
- ダイヤルA.B.C☆E (TBS Radio) (2016.09 - 2017.03)

=== Stage Play ===
- Shinshun Takizawa Kakumei (2009.01)
- Dream Boys (2009.09.04 - 10.25)
- She Loves Me (2009.12.12 - 2010.01.31)
- Shinsun Takizawa Kakumei (2010.01)
- Takizawa Kabuki (2010.04 - 05)
- Road to Playzone 2010 (2010.07 - 08)
- Boys (2010.09) starring with Kis-My-Ft2
- Shinsun Takizawa Kakumei (2011.01)
- Playzone'11 Song & Danc'N. (2011.08)
- Boys: Prison without Bars (2011.09)
- ABC-ZA Star Theatre (2012.02)
- Boys: Jail in the Sky (2012.09)
- ABC-ZA Legend of Johnnys' 2013 (2013.10)
- ABC-ZA Legend of Johnnys' 2014 (2014.05)
- ABC-ZA 2015 (2015.10)
- ABC-ZA 2016 Oenya Co., Ltd. OH & YEAH!! (2016.10)
- ABC-ZA Legend of Johnnys' 2017 (2017.10)
- ABC-ZA Legend of Johnnys' 2018 (2018.10)

=== Concerts ===
- A.B.C-Z Kis-My-Ft2 First Concert (11-13 Oct, 8-9 Nov 2008)
- Minna Crea ni Kite Kurie! (11–19 May 2010)
- 年末ヤング東西歌合戦！ 東西Jr.選抜大集合2010！ A.B.C-Z+ジャニーズJr.選抜 VS 中山優馬+関西Jr.選抜 (26-27 Nov 2010)
- Minna Crea ni Kite Kurie 2011 (29 March- 5 May, 13–18 May, 23–29 May 2011)
- A.B.C-Z 2011 first Concert in YOYOGI (6 Nov 2011)
- A.B.C.-Z. and Sexy Zone Johnny's Dome Theater ~SUMMARY~
- A.B.C-Z 2013 Twinkle×2 Star Tour (23 Mar 2013 - 25 May 2013)
- Summer Concert 2014 A.B.C-Z★"Legend" (2014)
- A.B.C-Z Early summer concert (2015)
- Sexy Zone A.B.C-Z Summer Paradise in TDC (2015)
- A.B.C-Z Star Line Travel concert (2016)
- A.B.C-Z 5Stars 5Years Tour (2017)
- A.B.C-Z Love Battle Tour (2018–2019)

=== Photobook ===
- [2017.04.25] Itsutsu Hoshi (五つ星)

=== Event ===
- A.B.C-Z 5stars CIRCUS in JOYPOLIS (2018)
- A.B.C-Z 5stars Festival in JOYPOLIS ([2019)
