= Tadayoshi Okura =

Japanese musician and actor (born 1985)

Tadayoshi Okura 大倉 忠義
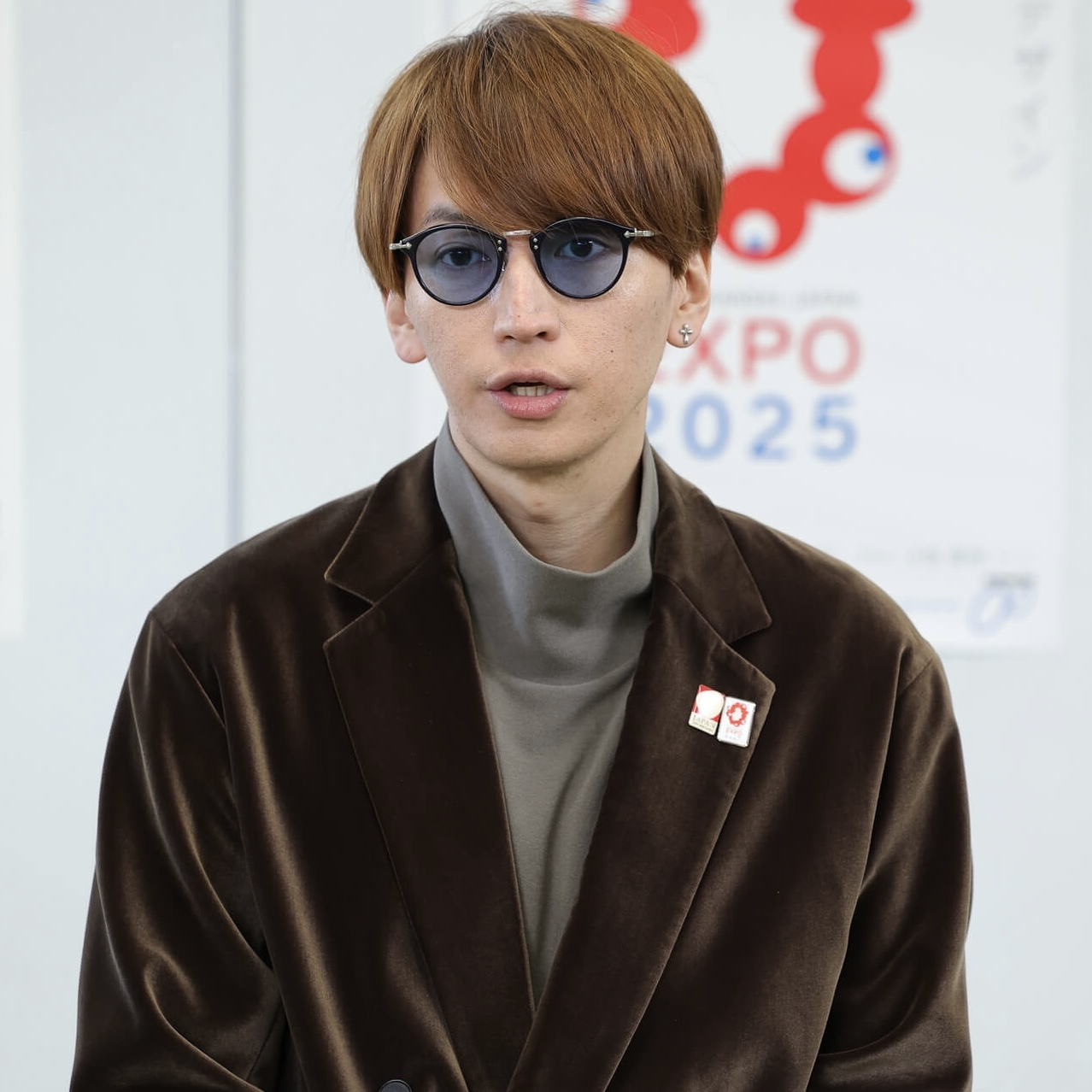
- Okura in January 2022

Background information
- Born: May 16, 1985 (age 41)
- Origin: Higashiōsaka, Osaka, Japan
- Genre: J-pop
- Occupations: Musician; actor; voice actor
- Instruments: Vocals; drums
- Years active: 1997–present
- Label: Teichiku Records; Imperial Records
- Member of: Super Eight
- Spouse: Unknown (m. 2025)

Tadayoshi Okura (大倉 忠義, Ōkura Tadayoshi; born May 16, 1985) is a Japanese singer, actor, voice actor and radio host. He is also a member and the drummer of Japanese male idol group Super Eight (previously known as Kanjani Eight), which was under the management of Johnny & Associates and now is under Starto Entertainment. His image color in the group is green.

== Early life ==
Okura is the eldest son of entrepreneur Tadashi Okura, president and CEO of Eternal Hospitality Group Co., Ltd., and founder of izakaya chain Torikizoku

== Career ==
His respect for Go Morita from V6, is the reason why Okura joined Johnny & Associates.

=== Johnny's Jr. and early career ===
Okura entered the agency on September 6, 1997. His cousin sent in a resume on his behalf, but was not called back to audition until 2 years later. During his audition, future co-members from what was to become Kanjani 8, where also there.

Okura had a difficult time finding work at the beginning. While he was acting in "Kyo to Kyo", a stage play, from 1997 to 1998, from 1999 to 2001 he had little to no performances. Around Spring 2001, was part of the Johnny's Jr. unit M.A.O., but left soon after. He had been chosen to be a part of V.West, a Kansai region-based Johnny's Jr., which would become Kanjani 8 by 2002, when he took over for the V West drummer. Fellow member Yasuda Shota told Johnny Kitagawa about Okura. In December 2002, he joined the program "J3KANSAI" as a new regular member. Not knowing how to drum but eager to try, Okura began intensive lessons.

=== Musical career ===
==== As a singer ====
Okura debuted with Kanjani 8 in 2004, with the Single "Nanika Iroha Bushi".

He had his first solo concert in 2008.

On January 17, 2016, he canceled his performance at the Kyocera Dome in Osaka due to an intestinal obstruction. On January 20, he reported that he had returned to work. It was the first time a member of the group had cancelled a concert appearance.

In 2022, Okura had to suspend activities temporarily due to low-tone sensorineural hearing loss in the right ear and tinnitus in both ears, which he had been diagnosed with. The decision was taken so that Okura would undergo treatment for the affection, so that he would return in better condition for their stadium live '18-sai' being held in July.

==== As a producer and director ====
In 2018, Okura and fellow member You Yokoyama directed the "Kansai Johnny's Jr. X’mas Party!! 2018", an event that had its origin in 2002, in the "Kanjani ∞ X'mas Party 2002 in Osaka Shochikuza" and "Kanjani ∞→ Johnny's WEST→ Kansai Johnny's Jr." events.

Okura is the producer of Kansai area group Naniwa Danshi.

Okura, together with Arashi's Jun Matsumoto, directed the concert series WE ARE! Let's get the party STARTO!!, which would take place in April and May 2024, as the first concerts offered by Starto Entertainment.

To better accomplish this, Okura announced the creation of his own production company. He announced on July 29, 2024, the start of a new company, "J-pop Legacy", for the purpose of producing and nurturing talents and developing new content. Okura was appointed the company's President and Representative Director. His own role as artist and member of Super Eight will continue to be under Starto.

==== As a lyricist ====
Okura wrote the lyrics to "Can’t stop", a song performed in the "Kansai Johnny's Jr. X’mas Party!!2018" event.

=== Acting career ===
Okura is active in TV dramas, playing a few major roles such as Yasuko to Kenji, Hissatsu Shigotonin, ROMES and GM Odore Doctor. In 2010, he appeared in movie for first time' playing the role of sword man Tsuruoka in Ooku. Besides, he is a hardcore fan of Mr.Children.

== Personal life ==
Okura made an announcement through his agency on February 24, 2025, that he had married a non-celebrity woman and is expecting their first child.

== Filmography ==
=== Drama ===
- 2000: Kowaii Nichiyoubi 2000 (ep 10 "Kioku kara no shisha ~ yomigaeru kako no kyōfu")
- 2006: Cinderella ni Naritai! as Ken Narumizaka/Bon Kuramochi (lead role)
- 2006: Gekidan Engimono: Intelligence as Hajime (lead role)
- 2007: Hissatsu Shigotonin 2007 as Genta
- 2007: Utahime as Jinguji-kun (James)
- 2008: Yasuko to Kenji as Jun Tsubaki
- 2009: Hissatsu Shigotonin 2009 as Genta
- 2009: Romes as Yūya Narushima (lead role)
- 2010: Gm: Odore Doctor as Kensuke Motoki
- 2011: Umareru as Hayashida Taichi
- 2012: Mikeneko Holmes no Suiri as Ishizu Ryohei
- 2012: papadol! as himself
- 2013: Otenki Onee-san as Detective Gota Aoki (lead role)
- 2014: Dr.Dmat: Gareki no Shita no Hippocrates as Hibiki Yakumo (lead role)
- 2014: Hana-chan no Misoshiru as Shingo Yasutake (lead role)
- 2015: Do S Deka as Shūsuke Daikanyama
- 2018: The Count of Monte Cristo as Yukio Nanjo
- 2021: Shitteru wife as Motoharu

=== Television shows ===
- 2024: timelesz project -AUDITION-

=== Film ===
- 2010: Ōoku as Tsuruoka
- 2012: Eight Ranger as Ookawa Ryousuke
- 2013: Crying 100 Times: Every Raindrop Falls as Fuji Shuichi
- 2014: Eight Ranger 2 as Ookawa Ryousuke
- 2014: Clover as Tsuge Susumu
- 2016: Shippu Rondo as Shōhei Nezu
- 2020: The Cornered Mouse Dreams of Cheese

=== Music film ===
- 2010: 8Uppers as Johnny

=== Commercials ===
- Otsuka Pharmaceutical "Oronamin C" (2006)
- Showgate Crying 100 Times (2013)
- Nintendo Wii U Mario & Sonic AT Sochi Olympics (2013)
- MTI Ltd. music.jp (2013, 2016)
- King (Japan) Candy Crush (2015-2016)
- Seven & I Holdings 7/11 "Noodles" (2018)
- Morinaga Koeda Chocolate (as producer for Kansai Jr. group AmBitious) (April - October 2022)
- Donuts Co., Ltd. Jobkan (April 2023)
