= Starto Entertainment =

Japanese entertainment company

Starto Entertainment Inc.

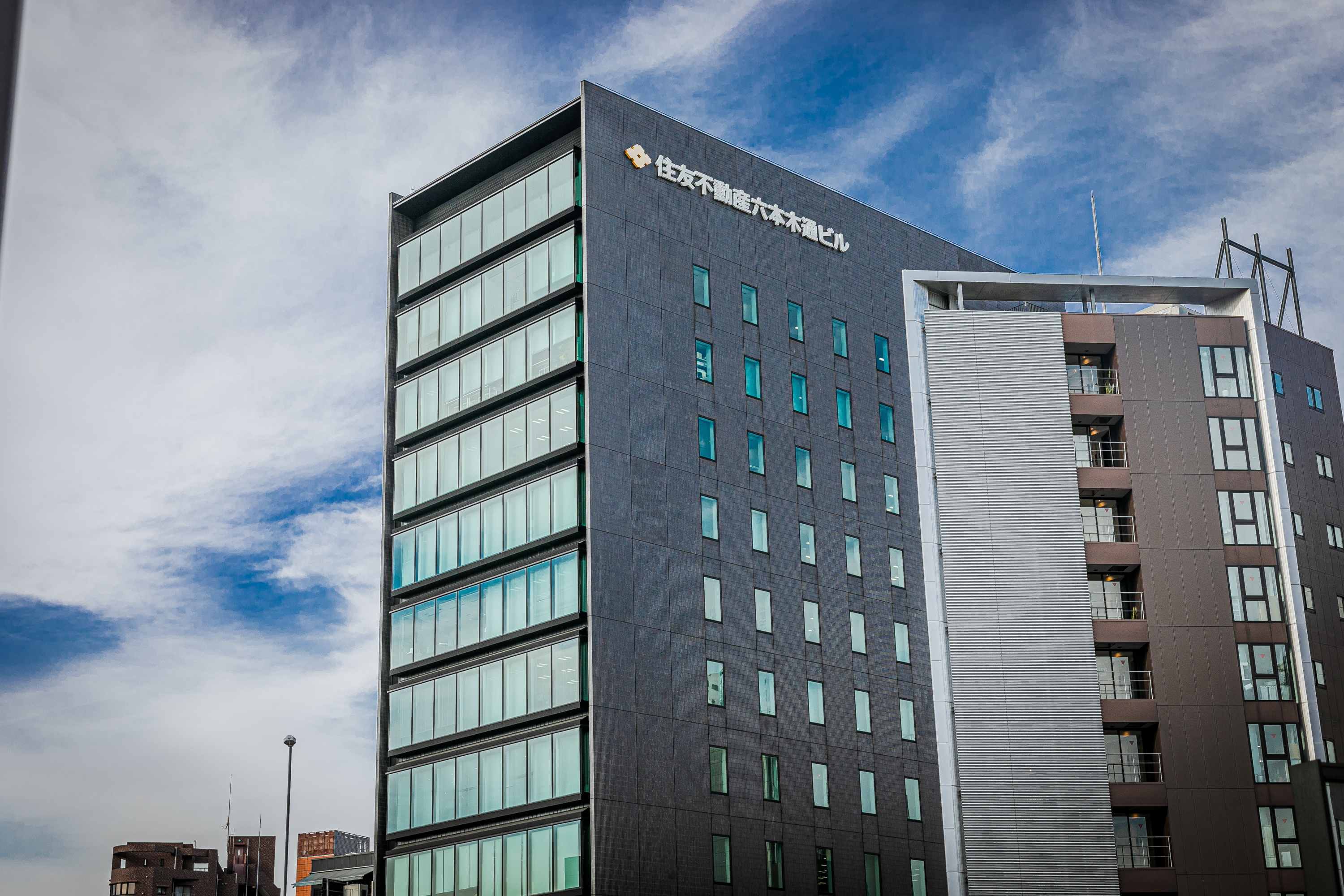
- Sumitomo Fudosan Roppongi-dōri Building, which hosts Starto's head office
- Native name: 株式会社スタートエンターテイメント
- Romanized name: Kabushiki-gaisha Stāto entāteimento
- Type: Private KK
- Founded: October 17, 2023; 3 years ago
- Headquarters: Roppongi, Minato, Tokyo, Japan
- Area served: Japan
- Key people: Katsuaki Suzuki (President)
- Services: Music production,, and artist development and management
- Number of employees: 185
- Website: starto.jp

Starto Entertainment Inc. (Japanese: 株式会社スタートエンターテイメント, Hepburn: Kabushiki-gaisha Stāto entāteimento) is a Japanese entertainment company that provides artist management services established on October 17, 2023. The president is Katsuaki Suzuki. Many of the groups and artists formerly affiliated with Johnny & Associates belong to this company. It began full operations in April 2024.

== Company formation ==
After he died in 2019, Johnny & Associates' founder Johnny Kitagawa's sexual abuse was revealed in 2023, on October 2, Julie Keiko Fujishima, Kitagawa's niece and successor, decided to compensate the victims and close the business. The name “Johnny” was erased from the company name because of Fujishima's desire to "erase all traces of Johnny Kitagawa from this world". Johnny & Associates changed its name to Smile-Up and concentrated on compensating the victims. Together with the change of activities of what was now Smile-Up, the establishment of a new company was being sought to ensure the continued activities of celebrities belonging to Johnnys & Associates, and Atsushi Fukuda, president of consulting firm Speedy Inc. was chosen to serve as its CEO.

Fukuda previously served as vice president of Sony Pictures in the United States and also as president and CEO of Sony Digital Entertainment, and had been involved in corporate management and the talent agency business since founding Speedy Inc. in 2017. Fukuda was chosen as a candidate for CEO because Smile-Up was interested in promoting "agent contract," a free work style, for its celebrities in the future. Fukuda, said to be well versed in the field of celebrities agent contracts, is known for having re-launched the career of actress Rena Nonen, who had been in a slump after quitting her agency.

The new company name "Starto Entertainment" was announced on December 8, 2023. The company name was chosen after much discussion from among 140,156 entries from fan club members. The name was chosen, because “... it is derived from ‘Star’ and ‘To,’ as in ‘to head toward the future,’”. On its official website, the company says, “We will accompany the current stars and those who will emerge in the future, following their individual personalities and goals. From here, we will start a new legend. This is what we are trying to express”. Fukuda also announced in his comments, that same day, that the artists can choose between a traditional management contract or a more liberal agent contract.

In establishing Starto Entertainment Inc., 10 million yen in investment capital was invested by management and employees, and neither Smile-Up, its affiliated companies, nor Julie Keiko Fujishima, the founding family member and president of the former Johnny & Associates invested in the company. At a press conference on December 9, 2023, CEO Fukuda announced that the company had found a way to obtain a loan from a financial institution for several hundred million yen in working capital for the time being.

Starto announced that it began full-fledged operations on April 10, 2024. As of April, it had 295 performers under contract in 28 groups, and 185 staff members. Many of the staff had previously worked for Johnny & Associates and were not involved in sexual abuse. Starto also said that it had established internal and external reporting channels for early detection of problems.

It is said that, in the past, celebrities from the former Johnny & Associates often did not co-star with celebrities who had left the agency or with competing boy bands. Fukuda mentioned this point as well, explaining that from now on he would make it possible to co-star with anyone, and that while Starto was also looking at overseas activities, nothing would get done if he talked narrowly about co-starring or not in the small world of Minato, Tokyo, where many of Japan's talent agencies have their headquarters. Fukuda said that from now on he will not allow any celebrity to say “I don't want to co-star with that celebrity". (Note: On April 12, 2024, TV Asahi music show “Music Station” featured a performance by Starto members 20th Century and SixTones co-starring boy band Number i, whose members had left the former Johnny's the previous year.) On July 6, 2024, on the program The Music Day, both remaining King & Prince members, as well as the members that had left (now re-grouped as Number_i), appeared within one hour of each other; Tomohisa Yamashita, who had left the agency in 2020, also made an appearance; and Starto artists collaborated with non-Starto artists in music duets.

== Fukuda's appointment as CEO ==
Fukuda stated the circumstances surrounding his appointment at a press conference on December 9, 2023. Initially, he was the most critical of Johnny Kitagawa's problems. (Note: To the point that conservative fans of Johnny & Associates' celebrities campaigned against his inauguration over his past statements.) Fukuda decried the crimes committed by Johnny Kitagawa, saying that the crimes committed were not at a level that could ever be forgiven in the world.

At the time of the October 2 press conference, Noriyuki Higashiyama was to be president of the new company, about a week later, Higashiyama, Julie Keiko Fujishima, and Yoshihiko Inohara had an opportunity to meet with Fukuda to talk to him about an agent contract. Fukuda said he was impressed by Higashiyama's big decision to retire from show business and focus on compensation work for victims at Johnny's, after initially saying he wanted to continue acting until he was 90. As he listened to what the three of them had to say, he came to realize that there was a culture within Johnny & Associates like a “lineage of admiring cool senior,” and that this culture had generated so much content that it now influences Korean popular music, etc. and that it would be a shame to see this disappear in the face of this criticism. Fukuda also said that he thought it would be a loss of Japan if their singing, dancing, and acting content were to fall apart, even though it is a treasure of Japan.

Afterward, Higashiyama then decided against becoming president of the new company, and Inohara honestly told Fukuda that he had become an executive of the company through this process, but that he knew nothing about management and asked Fukuda to be the president. Fukuda initially declined, saying that it was too much of a burden, but he accepted, partly to protect their culture and partly because he wanted to reform the old traditions that persisted in the Japanese entertainment industry. In accepting the presidency, Fukuda said that he understood management but knew nothing about training celebrities, and asked Inohara to teach him that part of the business. When Fukuda took over as president, he first began interviewing 160 of his celebrities. The first person he met was star celebrity Takuya Kimura. Fukuda spoke with Kimura about the future of the company. As a result, Kimura understood and recognized Fukuda and communicated this to his juniors. As a result, Fukuda said, he was able to facilitate smooth interviews with the rest of the celebrities. He offered the celebrities two types of contracts: a new "agent contract" to broker work and negotiate contracts, plus a traditional "management contract" to manage their schedules and follow up on their daily activities. The celebrities could choose between the two types of contracts and were also allowed the freedom to move to another agency. They were also free to leave the company and said they were prepared to accept celebrities who had left the company but wished to return.

== Management changes and restructuring ==
On June 27, 2025, Starto announced the resignation of Atsushi Fukuda as president and CEO, citing the expiration of his term and his own wishes. Katsuaki Suzuki, former President of Television Nishinippon Corporation, assumed the role of CEO.

In reports concerning Fukuda's resignation, a representative from the agency stated that Fukuda had originally planned to step down at this time. From the time of his appointment, his goals included the management of music publishing rights and the development of digital distribution services. During his tenure, music from affiliated groups became available on music streaming services, and music programs featuring the agency's artists were launched on services such as Amazon Prime Video and DMM TV. Additionally, with progress made in resolving the compensation issues for victims of sexual abuse related to Johnny Kitagawa through Smile-Up, it is believed that Fukuda decided it was the appropriate time to resign. Fukuda focused on strengthening compliance measures and establishing a robust governance structure. He is credited with laying the groundwork for the new company and taking a strong leadership role in areas such as social media engagement by affiliated artists, measures against ticket scalping, and countering online defamation.

Suzuki, the new president, joined Fuji Television in 1981 and served as the chief producer of the breakfast program Mezamashi TV, which he helped launch. He later held several key positions, including Director of Programming and Production, Executive Vice President, and Board Director at Fuji Media Holdings. In 2017, he became President of Television Nishinippon, a position he held for four years. After stepping down, he served as an advisor to various companies. His move to the regional affiliate was reportedly linked to a growing distance from then-Fuji TV CEO Hisashi Hieda.

On the same day, it was also announced that Yoshihiko Inohara, CMO and board director, as well as Kazuhiro Tatsuki, board director, stepped down from their positions. Inohara is expected to concentrate on his own career in show business.

== History ==
=== 2024 ===
On April 10, the concert We Are! Let's get the party Starto! was held at Tokyo Dome, featuring 13 groups from Starto, a total of 72 artists. The event was directed by Jun Matsumoto (Arashi) and Tadayoshi Okura (Super Eight). This performance was also held on May 29 and 30 at Kyocera Dome Osaka. A portion of the performance on May 29 was streamed live on YouTube, while the performance on May 30 was streamed for a fee. In response to the 2024 Noto earthquake that occurred on January 1, the charity song “We are” was released by Starto artists of 14 groups, 75 people in total. The song was released for digital download on April 10 and on CD on July 24, with all proceeds donated to support earthquake relief efforts. (Note: Originally scheduled for release on June 12, it was postponed to July 24 due to production flaws in the music video.)

On April 29, the formation of KAMIGATA BOYZ, a collaboration group of four groups from the Kansai region, Super Eight, West, Naniwa Danshi, and Ae! Group, was announced. Their debut single Musekinin de Eejanaika Love was released digitally on May 3, and a video of the song was released on YouTube the same day.

On May 15, Ae! Group made their CD debut as the first group since the full launch of Starto.

Jun Matsumoto, member of Arashi, announced his departure from Starto for solo pursuits starting May 30. He continues as part of Arashi through an agent contract.

timelesz started recruiting for new members, and the process began streaming on Netflix under the title timelesz -AUDITION- PROJECT starting September 13. Participation of Starto Junior members as candidates, uncertain as of start of the series. On the other hand, 3 members, Takuto Teranishi, Yoshitaka Hara, and Daichi Imae, nicknamed the "actors unit", joined Timelesz auditions as candidates during the fourth round, after the group and staff had chosen 15 candidates out of 18,922 applicants.

=== 2025 ===
It was reported that Snow Man would have 2 concerts in Japan National Stadium in 2025, making it the 3rd group from the former Johnny & Associates's debuted groups (after SMAP and Arashi) and the first of Starto Entertainment to perform there. The tour "Snow Man 1st Stadium Live Snow World" takes place on April 19 and 20 at the National Stadium and at Nissan Stadium in Kanagawa on June 7 and 8.

On February 12, Starto announced that KAT-TUN would disband at the end of March, stating that since the company signed a contract with KAT-TUN in April 2024, it had been discussing with the members whether or not they would continue their activities and decided not to sign a second-year contract starting April 1. Member Kazuya Kamenashi would leave Starto as of March 31, while the remaining members, Yuichi Nakamaru and Tatsuya Ueda, would remain with Starto and continue their activities as individuals.

On February 15, new members of Timelesz were announced. After a year-long audition process, three new members were selected from the general public: Shuto Inomata, Taiki Shinozuka, and Masaki Hashimoto, in addition to Takuto Teranishi and Yoshitaka Hara, who had previously worked as actors in Starto. Timelesz continues as an eight-member group.

On February 16, three new groups of trainees (Junior), ACEes, Key To Lit (read: Kiteretsu), and B & Zai (read: Banzai), were announced. The previously active groups Bi Shonen, HiHi Jets, and 7 Men Samurai were disbanded, and the members who had been there or in Shonen Ninja were selected for the new groups.

After almost 2 years of no Starto artists on NHK programs, especially on music programs, Ae! Group participated on the broadcaster's music program "Uta Con" on March 25, 2025. The group has been the only Starto artist to appear on an NHK program (not counting asadora Anpan participation of Arashi's Kazunari Ninomiya, who is no longer a Starto member for individual activities).

On April 1, 2025, another disbandment was announced, this time of a Kansai Juniors group. Lil Kansai was announced to stop activities on this day, with members continuing to work as individual artists within the agency, except for member Ryūko Toma, who would leave the agency on March 31.

On April 26, Starto announced through its official website that it had entered into a business partnership with a newly established company, "J-pop Legacy", led by Tadayoshi Okura of the five-member group Super Eight. Beginning in May 2025, J-pop Legacy will be entrusted with responsibilities including the development, discovery, and production of trainees.

In May, announcement of Arashi's end of activities on May 31, 2026, took fans by surprise, after being the witness of their announcement of the start of a company and the group's agent contract adquired with Starto the year before. It was also reported that member Satoshi Ohno would leave the agency on the same day.

On November 30, Starto shared a report that on December 31 they would be ending the agent contract the agency had with Tokio, group that disbanded in June 2025. Tokio had established Tokio Co., Ltd. in April 1, 2021 and got their contract with Starto on April 12.

On December 6, Starto announced that it is holding a New Year’s countdown concert from December 31 to January 1. It is the company’s first such event since its establishment and the first countdown concert in three years since the final one held under the former Johnny & Associates. The concert is available as a paid stream on FAMILY CLUB online from 10:30 p.m. Netflix provides the full live performance from January 7 and releases behind-the-scenes making-of footage from January 30.

=== 2026 ===
On January 8, Starto announced the opening of YouTube and TikTok channels, as well as social network accounts, for a project involving members of the acting department, under the unit name "Akutare". The project, called "Ichi ni Tsuite" has members Sho Takada, Daichi Imae, Kota Matsumoto, Kensho Tomioka and Yuki Nozawa in short films about experiences that everyone goes through. The project's title is a phrase used before the start of a competition, the "moment of readiness" just before starting something. It embodies the idea of capturing the "moment of a new start" for adults who have reached a turning point in their lives, despite their doubts and anxieties.

On August 17, Starto announced the debut of Junior group Key to Lit in Winter 2026.

In August, news of Nozomu Kotaki and Ryusei Fujii leaving West. on August 31 was announced. Following talks with the remaining five members, they decided to disband on September 30. News of the disbandment was announced on September 24. All members will continue within Starto as individuals.

In September, news of the agency's multi–group New Year's Eve "STARTO to World Countdown Concert" being streamed on Netflix was announced. As soon as it came out, comments on social network by fans of the agency's artists asked for the return of Jun Matsumoto as concert director, following a not so favorable direction by Timelesz's Fuma Kikuchi the year before. According to the multiple comments, Kikuchi's direction favored some members, giving more songs and appearance time to some groups and individuals and less to others, resulting in an uneven performance, in contrast to Matsumoto's attention to detail, together with his long time experience directing. Another negative aspect regarding Kikuchi's direction that could provoke some backlash, is the September 19 incident involving his group's member Inomata, which resulted in his arrest.

== Starto Entertainment legal measures ==
=== Against ticket reselling ===
In September, Starto, in cooperation with Young Communication (YC), the site that hosts many of the concerts and stage performances in which Starto's contract artists appear, announced that it had filed a request for disclosure of information regarding the operator of a ticket-reselling website. According to a statement that the agency released on its official site, Starto had discovered around 10,000 cases of ticket scalping involving their artists, 3,000 of them being of the group Naniwa Danshi alone, for whom around 100 tickets were being resold at an excess of 100,000 yen. On August 26, Starto and YC had requested the information through Tokyo Flex Law Office for 299 transactions but received no information in return. On September 5, WaveDash, the operating company of the "Ticket Distribution Center", the site where the scalpers were detected, announced that it would refuse to disclose the information, so Starto and Young filed a request with the Tokyo District Court for disclosure of information based on the Provider Liability Limitation Act. The agency emphasized its commitment to eradicating illegal ticket resales to ensure that more fans can purchase tickets at their intended prices. It is considered the first case nationwide that an entertainment business requests information to a reseller site. In 2019 "Prohibition of Unauthorized Resale of Tickets Act" was passed and crackdown of high-priced resellers was strengthened. One case was that of a 24-year-old nursery schoolteacher that was arrested on suspicion of violating the Act. From June to September 2019, the woman had illegally resold electronic tickets to three people for an Arashi concert, ranging from 40,000 t0 133,000 yen. In August 2020, the Osaka District Court sentenced her to one year and six months prison, sentence suspended for three years because of admittance of guilt and fined 300,000 yen. Her plan was to get tickets to obtain the best seat, reselling the surplus tickets to obtain funds for the next event.

On March 19, 2025, Starto Entertainment and Young Communication shared posts related to the request for disclosure of information requested in November and December 2024 against "Ticket Jam" and "Ticket Distribution Center". On March 10, 2025, YC's petition was accepted by the court, and an order was issued for disclosure of sender information on March 10, 2025, for all resale listings named in the request, resulting in the decision being the first landmark judicial decision in Japan in which the resale of concert tickets is judged to be an infringement of rights. A new request of information is being made for over 4000 tickets resold in February 2025. In addition, Young Communication informed about the installation of their own reseller site in summer, where people will be able to resell legally their tickets at a fixed price.

On June 23, 2025, Starto, through Young Communications, reported the launch of the official ticket resale service, "RELIEF Ticket". The site will be operated by Pia Corporation.

=== Protecting artists rights ===
On August 23, 2024, the agency set a reporting form, where anyone could report to the company any kind of infringement of rights of their artist. On January 29, 2025, the company released a document on the official site, reporting that, since opening the reporting form, close to 70 thousand reports had been done, most of them about information that could affect not only the artists, but their family, friends and those close to them. The agency posted: "We are taking legal measures such as consulting with the police, requesting disclosure of sender information, and requesting deletion of articles and posts, but we will continue to respond resolutely to protect the safety and rights of our contract talents and related parties."

Several posts defaming Arashi's Satoshi Ohno were found on the internet in November 2024, around the date of Arashi's anniversary. The group has been on hiatus since 2021, and the only one not in public has been him. Starto responded with a post on the official site. In the post, they stated: "It must be said that such unfounded articles and posts are malicious and significantly reduce Ohno's social reputation, and we cannot overlook the widespread dissemination of these false articles and posts as if they were true. We are currently preparing to take legal action against these malicious articles and posts. In order to protect the reputation of talents, we will continue to take strict measures, including legal action, against false articles and defamatory posts on social media, etc., together with our team of lawyers." On the 31th, Starto posted a follow-up. 7 defamatory articles and postings had been found. On the page, Starto indicated: "as a result of proceeding with legal action against the Internet site that posted the defamatory article, we have confirmed the results such as the closure of the site where the article was published."

On February 4, 2025, on the Timelesz Project's SNS, a post calling attention to slander: "We will take strict measures, including legal action". This was after confirmed content and information that can be taken as slander was found on SNS, in particular, following the results of the fifth round of screening. "This situation cannot be overlooked". Starto Entertainment, which operates the timelesz project, will take strict action.

== Artists ==
Those who made their CD debut as a group are commonly referred to as "debut group". There are also individual actors and entertainers. Those who belong to Starto but have not yet debuted or started acting are trainees and are commonly referred to as “junior". Although 4U is a group with a long history of activity, it has not made its CD debut. New trainee recruitment began on May 25, 2024.

=== Musical groups ===
==== Groups ====
- 20th Century
- NEWS
- Super Eight
- Hey! Say! JUMP
- Kis-My-Ft2
  - Busaiku
- Timelesz
  - Fuma Kikuchi (under agent contract since April 2024)
  - Shuto Inomata (until September 30, 2026)
- A.B.C-Z
- SixTones
- Snow Man
- Naniwa Danshi
- Travis Japan
- Ae! group
  - Richard Keito Kusama (until November 20, 2025)

==== Groups under agent contract ====
- King & Prince

==== Collaboration Groups ====
- KAMIGATA BOYZ
  - Super Eight
  - West.
  - Naniwa Danshi

=== Actors, Soloists and Entertainers ===
==== Actors/Soloists ====
- Takuya Kimura
- Koichi Domoto (under individual agent contract since April 2024, to continue under individual contract from July 2026 after Domoto (group) disbandment)
- Hiroki Uchi
- Jun Hasegawa
- Keito Okamoto
- Yuto Nakajima
- Kento Nakajima
- Fumito Kawai (under agent contract since April 29, 2024)
- Shota Hayashi (actor)
- Ryuta Muro
- Sho Takada
- Daichi Imae
- Kota Matsumoto
- Kensho Tomioka
- Yuki Nozawa
- Kōji Uchiumi
- Atsuhiro Satō

==== Entertainers ====
- 4U
  - Yuki Koshioka
  - Yusuke Matsuzaki
  - Yuta Fukuda
  - Yudai Tatsumi
- Yuichi Nakamaru (under agent and management mixed contract since January 2024)
- Tatsuya Ueda
- Richard Keito Kusama
- Sho Sakurai (under individual agent contract since April 2024)
- Masaki Aiba
- Ryusei Fujii (from September 1, 2026)
- Nozomu Kotaki (from September 1, 2026)
- Junta Nakama (from October 1, 2026)
- Takahiro Hamada (from October 1, 2026)
- Akito Kiriyama (from October 1, 2026)
- Daiki Shigeoka (from October 1, 2026)
- Tomohiro Kamiyama (from October 1, 2026)

=== Former company artists ===
==== Groups ====
- KAT-TUN (until March 31, 2025)
  - Kazuya Kamenashi (until March 31, 2025)
- West. (until September 30, 2026)

==== Groups under agent contract ====
- TOKIO (until June 25, 2025)
- Arashi (until May 31, 2026)
  - Kazunari Ninomiya (went independent for individual activities in October 2023)
  - Jun Matsumoto (went independent for individual activities in May 2024)
  - Satoshi Ohno (until May 31, 2026)
- Domoto (until July 21, 2026)
  - Tsuyoshi Domoto (until March 31, 2024)

==== Actors ====
- Yuma Nakayama (until January 31, 2025)

=== Trainees (Junior) ===
The Junior groups are groups within the agency that are yet to debut. On February 16, 2025, Starto announced a major reorganization within these groups, the results: one Junior starting solo activities (still as Junior) and the creation of 3 new groups. On April 1, 36 names were removed from the site, including AmBitious's Taro Yoshikawa and Raku Kawashita, and Lil Kansai's Ruuko Touma, who have departed the agency.

In December 2025, former Timelesz Project candidate Noa Asai was announced as a new Junior. He and other Junior participated on Super Eight's Tadayoshi Okura's production "Junior Showcase 2025 Rising Star -Shinsei-", opened at the Tokyo Globe Theater on December 9.

From January 29 to February 1, 2026, 77 Juniors, including groups ACEes, KEY TO LIT and B&ZAI, participated the Kanto–Kansai group concert series "Junior STAR to FESTIVAL 2026", started at the Yokohama Arena in Kanagawa.

==== Active groups ====
- SpeciaL (ja) - formed 2018
- Go!Go!Kids (ja)- formed 2022
- Boys be (ja) - formed 2020
- AmBitious (ja)- formed 2021
- ACEes - formed in 2025
- B&ZAI - formed in 2025
- Howzit – formed in 2026
- KEY TO LIT (formed in 2025, debut in Winter 2026)

==== Junior soloists ====
- Naoki Fujii (former Bi Shonen)
- Kairu Tamura (former Shonen Ninja)
- Nao Oriyama (former Shonen Ninja)
- Koki Kawasaki (former Shonen Ninja)
- Sota Uchimura (former Shonen Ninja)
- Koki Kuroda (former Shonen Ninja)
- Kousei Hiyama (former Shonen Ninja)
- Ren Kubo (former Shonen Ninja)
- Waku Motoki (former Shonen Ninja)
- Takumi Kitagawa (former Shonen Ninja)
- Kohei Aoki (former Shonen Ninja)
- Hideo Ajima (former Shonen Ninja)
- Wataru Vasayegh (former Shonen Ninja)
- Yojiro Taki (former Shonen Ninja)
- Tsubasa Yamai (former Shonen Ninja)
- Yusei Nagase (former Shonen Ninja)
- Rikuto Toyoda (former Shonen Ninja)
- Noa Asai

==== Former Junior groups ====
- 7 Men Samurai - formed 2018, restructured in 2025
- HiHi Jets (ja) - formed 2015, restructured in 2025
  - Yuto Takahashi (until October 1, 2024)
- Bi Shonen (美 少年) - formed 2016, restructured in 2025
  - Issei Kanasashi (until November 24, 2024)
- Lil Kansai (Lil かんさい) - formed 2019, disbanded 2025
  - Ruuku Toma (until March 31, 2025)
- Shonen Ninja (少年忍者) - formed 2018, restructured in 2025 (Until November 30, 2025)

== Executives ==
- Katsuaki Suzuki - Chief executive officer From June 27, 2025
- Shinichiro Tsukuda - Chief operating officer
- Mika Wada - Chief customer officer
- Yuichi Yoshimura - Audit ＆ Supervisory Board Member
- Masao Takiyama - Independent director
- Masahiro Daiko - General Manager of Osaka Branch Office

=== Former Executives ===
- Atsushi Fukuda - Chief executive officer until June 27, 2025
- Yoshihiko Inohara - Chief marketing officer until June 27, 2025
- Kazuhiro Tatsuki - Chief financial officer until June 27, 2025

== Charity activities ==
Starto continued with the charity projects as part of their 2024 activities. The single "We are", sung by the special unit "STARTO for you", formed by 75 members of 14 groups, was released in digital form on April 10, and as CD on June 12, with proceeds of the sales of the single going to Noto Earthquake relief funds.

As of June 5, 2024, the "Smile-Up Project", name of the last Johnny & Associates charity project, which served during the COVID pandemic, and was used during the first activities with Starto, is no longer, being reborn under the name "Mindful", for which a new company has been established. General Incorporated Association "Mindful" will take over the charity activities, as well as other social contribution activities, like mental health care (which includes the support for sexual assault victims), enrollment support for higher education students in the Nursing field, and others.

== Concert ==
=== Joint concert ===
Organized by Starto Entertainment

Year	Title	Schedule	Venue	Performing group	Stage director	Note
2024	We Are! Let's get the party Starto!!	10 April	Tokyo Dome	Super Eight, KAT-TUN, Hey! Say! JUMP, Kis-My-Ft2, timelesz, A.B.C-Z, WEST., King & Prince, SixTones, Snow Man, Naniwa Danshi, Travis Japan, Ae! Group	Jun Matsumoto (Arashi); Tadayoshi Okura (Super Eight)	NEWS performed only in Osaka. Shori Sato (timelesz) appeared only in the video due to his appearance in the musical Shock, Ren Nagase (King & Prince) missed concert in Osaka due to an ear injury.
2024	We Are! Let's get the party Starto!!	29-30 May	Kyocera Dome Osaka	NEWS, Super Eight, KAT-TUN, Hey! Say! JUMP, Kis-My-Ft2, timelesz, A.B.C-Z, WEST., King & Prince, SixTones, Snow Man, Naniwa Danshi, Travis Japan, Ae! Group	Jun Matsumoto (Arashi); Tadayoshi Okura (Super Eight)	NEWS performed only in Osaka. Shori Sato (timelesz) appeared only in the video due to his appearance in the musical Shock, Ren Nagase (King & Prince) missed concert in Osaka due to an ear injury.
2025	Countdown Concert 2025-2026 Starto to Move	31 December 2025 – 1 January 2026	Tokyo Dome	NEWS, Hey! Say! JUMP, Kis-My-Ft2, timelesz, Kento Nakajima, A.B.C-Z, King & Prince, SixTones, Snow Man, Naniwa Danshi, Travis Japan, Ae! Group, Koichi Domoto, Masahiro Matsuoka	Fuma Kikuchi	West. did not participate as they were holding a countdown concert at Kyocera Dome Osaka. During the New Year's countdown, a live feed from the venue was broadcast.
2026	Countdown Concert 2026-2027 Starto to World	31 December 2026 – 1 January 2027	TBA	TBA	TBA	

== See also ==
- Category:Starto Entertainment artists
