= Satomi Ishihara =

Japanese actress (born 1986)

- 石原 さとみ
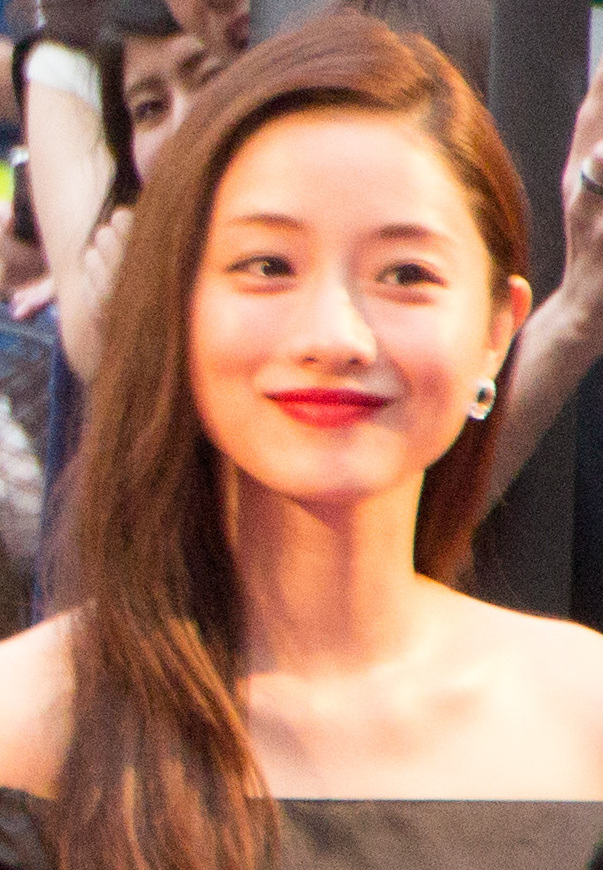
- Ishihara at the premiere of Shin Godzilla in July 2016
- Born: Kuniko Ishigami; December 24, 1986 (age 39); Tokyo, Japan
- Occupation: Actress
- Years active: 2003–present
- Agent: Horipro
- Spouse: Unknown (m. 2020)
- Children: 2

Kuniko Ishigami (石神 国子, Ishigami Kuniko; born December 24, 1986), better known by her stage name Satomi Ishihara (石原 さとみ, Ishihara Satomi), is a Japanese actress.

== Early life and career ==
Kuniko Ishigami was born on December 24, 1986 in Tokyo, Japan.

She attended Tokyo Soka Elementary School, Soka Junior High School, and graduated from Soka High School.

In 2003, at the age of 16, Satomi began her acting career when she starred in the drama kimi wa Petto, starring Jun Matsumoto and Koyuki. She has devoted equal time to films and television serials. Satomi was nominated for several such awards, such as Best Actress at the 46th Blue Ribbon Awards for role in the film My Grandpa and Best Supporting Actress in the 45th Japan Academy Film Prize for her role in the film And so the baton is passed. She appeared as Yazawa Shiori in Fuji TV drama Water Boys 2 (2004), as Shizuka Gozen in the NHK Taiga drama series Yoshitsune (2005).

In 2006, Ishihara made her first starring role in a Fuji TV commercial drama series, Ns' Aoi. In the fall of the same year, she made her stage debut as the role of Helen Keller in The Miracle Worker.

In August 2008, Ishihara made her second stage appearance as Okita Souji in Bakumatsu Junjoden, written and directed by Tsutomu Kohei. By one month later, in September of the same year, she also portrayed as a Japanese leading JAL flight attendant character Yukari Hayase in Flying Rabbits, directed by Takahisa Zeze.

In 2009, Ishihara made her debut as Kanako Kuboaki in Fuji TV drama series Voice: The Voice of the Innocent, which held every Monday at 9 p.m. In the fall of the same year, she appeared as Takiko Taguchi in Suite: Massacre, directed by Hisashi Inoue.

In 2010, Ishihara appeared as Akiyama Tokiko (wife of Akiyama Saneyuki) in NHK special war drama television series, Clouds Above the Hill.

In 2014, Ishihara is known to Japanese television drama audiences for her portrayal as Saeko Takahashi in Shitsuren Chocolatier, and gained popularity by appearing in it. Also, alongside her co-star Nao Matsushita, she appeared as Misaki Fukazawa in Japanese television love comedy drama series Dear Sister.

In 2016, Ishihara starred as her portrayal of Kayoko Ann Patterson in kaiju film Shin Godzilla, and also starred as Etsuko Kouno in NTV drama series Pretty Proofreader.

In 2018, Ishihara starred as Mikoto Misumi in TBS TV drama series Unnatural, and as well as starred as Momo Tsukishima in NTV drama series Born to Be a Flower.

At the beginning of Reiwa period, in early 2019, Ishihara was appointed as one of the 2020 Tokyo Summer Olympics torch relay ambassadors, which the country had an upcoming game event a year later. However, the 2020 Tokyo Summer Olympics and Paralympics was delayed to 2021 due to the COVID-19 pandemic. Also, on February 4, 2021, Ishihara had been revealed that she caught COVID-19 infection. According to her agency, Ishihara "is healthy and [she] was not showing any symptoms", though it was reported that she had been recovering at home.

In 2024, Ishihara appeared as a lead role of Saori Morishita in Japanese drama film Missing, which she was nominated for a Hochi Film Award and a Japan Academy Film Prize for Best Actress.

== Personal life ==
Ishihara announced her marriage on October 1, 2020. She did not reveal her spouse's name, age, or occupation, only that they were not famous. They have two children, born in 2022 and 2025.

== Filmography ==
=== Television dramas ===
Year	Title	Character	Notes	Ref.
2003	Mado o Aketara	Usagi Yamamoto	Lead role; television film	
2003–04	Teru Teru Kazoku	Fuyuko	Lead role; Asadora	
2004	Tengoku e no Oenka Cheers: Cheerleading ni Kaketa Seishun	Mikiko Morita	Lead role	
2004	Be-Bop High School	Kyōko Izumi	Lead role	
2004	Water Boys 2	Shiori Yazawa		
2005	Yoshitsune	Shizuka	Taiga drama	
2005	H2	Haruka Koga		
2005	Akai Giwaku	Yukiko Oshima	Lead role; miniseries	
2005	Kaidan Special "Chigiri"	Yui	Lead role; short drama	
2005	Be-Bop High School 2	Kyōko Izumi	Lead role	
2005	Climber's High	Ayako Mochizuki		
2006	Ns' Aoi	Aoi Misora	Lead role	
2006	Te no Ue no Shabondama	Risa Sakuraba		
2006	Ns' Aoi Special "Sakurakawa Byōin Saiaku no Hi"	Aoi Misora	Lead role; television film	
2006	Hyōten	Yōko Tsujiguchi	Lead role; miniseries	
2007	Tsubasa no Oreta Tenshitachi 2007	Yuri Yoshimura	Lead role; television film	
2007	Hanayome to Papa	Aiko Uzaki	Lead role	
2007	Tales of the Unusual: Autumn 2007 "Mirai Dōsōkai"	Haruka Matsui	Lead role; short drama	
2007	Koi no Karasawagi: Love Stories IV "Koe ga Furueru Onna"	Mutsumi Hikoda	Lead role	
2007	Maru Maru Chibi Maruko-chan Episode 26	Ping-Pong-Pang's Lady (voice)		
2008	Rokumeikan	Akiko Daitokuji	Television film	
2008	Puzzle	Misako Ayukawa	Lead role	
2008	Walkin' Butterfly	Yukari Hayase	Guest	
2008	Nagaiki Kyōsō!	Eri Yamada	Television film	
2009	Voice: Inochi Naki Mono no Koe	Kanako Kuboaki		
2009	Kochira Katsushika-ku Kameari Kōen-mae Hashutsujo	Moeko (45 years ago)	Guest	
2009	Hadaka no Taishō Hinokuni Kumamoto Hen: Onna Gokoro ga Funka Surunode	Tami Shimojō	Television film	
2009	Tsubakiyama Kachō no Nanokakan	Tsubaki	Lead role; television film	
2009–11	Clouds Over the Hill	Sueko Akiyama		
2010	Daibutsu Kaigan	Abe no Naishinnō	Miniseries	
2010	Hidarime Tantei Eye	Hitomi Sayama	Lead role	
2010	Toubō Bengoshi	Emi Ninomiya		
2010	Reinouryokusha Odagiri Kyōko no Uso	Kyōko Odagiri	Lead role	
2011	Bull Doctor	Chika Kamatsuda		
2011	Shimei to Tamashii no Limit	Yuki Himuro	Lead role	
2012	Dakatsu no Gotoku	Shioko Furuda		
2012	Rich Man, Poor Woman	Makoto Natsui	Lead role	
2013	Lucky Seven Special	Mizuki Kurihara	Television film	
2013	Rich Man, Poor Woman in New York	Makoto Natsui	Lead role	
2013	Tales of the Unusual: Autumn 2013 "Karikon"	Narumi Morita	Lead role; short drama	
2013	Koi	Fumiko Yano	Lead role	
2014	Shinzanmono Special: Nemuri no Mori	Mio Asaoka	Television film	
2014	Heartbroken Chocolatier	Saeko Takahashi	Lead role	
2014	True Horror Stories: 15th-year anniversary special "S Douzan no Onna"	Natsumi Yamabe	Lead role; short drama	
2014	Dear Sister	Misaki Fukazawa	Lead role	
2015	5→9 From Five to Nine	Junko Sakuraba	Lead role	
2016	Pretty Proofreader	Etsuko Kouno	Lead role	
2018	Unnatural	Mikoto Misumi	Lead role	
2018	Born to Be a Flower	Momo Tsukishima	Lead role	
2020	Unsung Cinderella	Aoi Midori	Lead role	
2021	The Greatest Gift	Yuriko Tabuchi	Lead role; television film	
2021	Love Deeply	Mio Nagisa	Lead role	
2024	Destiny	Kanade Nishimura	Lead role	
2026	Politica Lupin	Yayoi Kisaragi	Lead role	

=== Films ===
Year	Title	Character	Notes	Ref.
2003	My Grandpa	Tamako Godai		
2005	Jam Films S Suberidai			
2005	One Year in the North	Tae Komatsubara		
2007	Hōtai Club	Emiko Kiba (Wara)		
2008	Ginmakuban Sushi Ōji: New York e Iku	Burusu Lily	Cameo	
2008	Flying Rabbits	Yukari Hayase	Lead role	
2010	No Longer Human	Yoshiko		
2010	Zatoichi: The Last	Tane		
2010	The Incite Mill	Miya Sekimizu		
2011	Manzai Gang	Yumiko Miyazaki		
2012	Gekkō no Kamen	Yayoi		
2012	Sadako 3D	Akane Ayukawa	Lead role	
2012	Bungo: Stories of Desire	Fujiko	Anthology film	
2012	Crow's Thumb	Yahiro Kawai		
2013	Sadako 3D 2	Akane Ayukawa / Sadako Yamamura	Special appearance	
2014	Monsterz	Kanae Kumoi		
2014	Bakumatsu Kōkousei	Mikako Kawabe	Lead role	
2015	The Lion Standing in the Wind	Wakako Kusano		
2015	Attack on Titan	Hans		
2016	Shin Godzilla	Kayoko Ann Patterson		
2017	Mumon: The Land of Stealth	Okuni		
2019	The 47 Ronin in Debt	Yōzen-in		
2021	And So the Baton Is Passed	Rika		
2024	Missing	Saori Morishita	Lead role	
2024	Last Mile	Mikoto Misumi		

=== Broadcasting ===
- Satomi Say To Me (Every Sunday, 9:30 PM, Nippon Hoso)

== Awards and nominations ==
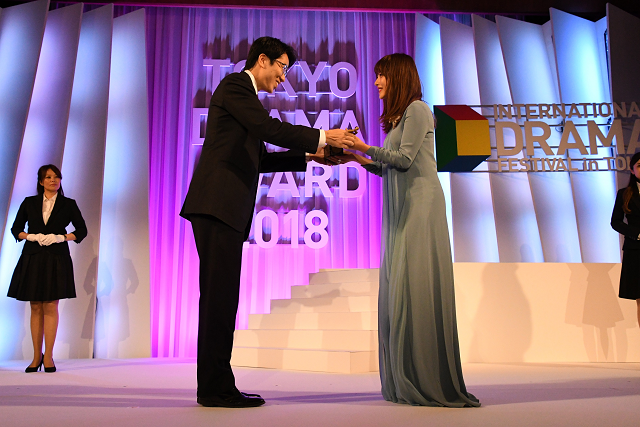
In October 2018, Ishihara won the Best Actress Award at the International Drama Festival in Tokyo.

Year	Organization	Award	Work	Result	Ref.
2003	28th Hochi Film Awards	Best Newcomer	My Grandpa	Won	
2003	16th Nikkan Sports Film Awards	Rookie of the Year	My Grandpa	Won	
2003	46th Blue Ribbon Awards	Best Newcomer	My Grandpa	Won	
2003	13th Japan Movie Critics Award	Best Newcomer	My Grandpa	Won	
2003	27th Japan Academy Film Prize	Newcomer Award	My Grandpa	Won	
2003	41st Golden Arrow Award	Broadcast Newcomer; Best Newcomer	Teru Teru Kazoku	Won	
2004	25th Yokohama Film Festival	Best New Talent	My Grandpa	Won	
2005	29th Elan d'or Awards	Newcomer of the Year	Water Boys 2	Won	
2006	29th Japan Academy Film Prize	Best Supporting Actress	One Year in the North	Nominated	
2010	Vogue Japan	Women of the Year	Herself	Won	
2014	7th Tokyo Drama Awards	Best Supporting Actress	Heartbroken Chocolatier	Won	
2018	11th Tokyo Drama Awards	Best Actress	Unnatural	Won	
2021	26th Asian Television Awards	Best Actress in a Leading Role	The Greatest Gift	Won	
2022	45th Japan Academy Film Prize	Best Supporting Actress	And So the Baton Is Passed	Nominated	
2024	49th Hochi Film Awards	Best Actress	Missing	Won	
2024	37th Nikkan Sports Film Awards	Best Actress	Missing	Nominated	
2025	79th Mainichi Film Awards	Best Lead Performance	Missing	Nominated	
2025	67th Blue Ribbon Awards	Best Actress	Missing	Nominated	
2025	48th Japan Academy Film Prize	Best Actress	Missing	Nominated	
