= List of awards and nominations received by Sex and the City =

List of awards won by Sex and the City
Awards and nominations
Award	Won	Nominated
American Cinema Editors Award	2	5
American Comedy Awards	0	6
AFI Awards	1	2
BMI Film & TV Awards	3	3
British Comedy Awards	0	2
Chris Awards	1	1
CINE Golden Eagle Awards	3	3
Costume Designers Guild	4	6
Directors Guild of America Award	2	10
Emmy Awards	7	54
GLAAD Media Award	1	4
Golden Globe Awards	8	24
Golden Nymph Awards	2	2
Golden Reel Awards	1	4
Makeup Artist & Hairstylist Guild Awards	3	4
NAACP Image Award	0	2
NAMIC Vision Awards	0	1
OFTA Television Awards	2	32
PRISM Awards	2	2
Producers Guild of America Awards	3	4
Satellite Award	2	5
Screen Actors Guild Award	3	11
SHINE Awards	2	2
Television Critics Association Awards	0	4
Women's Image Network Awards	1	1
Writers Guild of America Awards	0	12
- Total number of wins and nominations
Totals	55	210
- References

Sex and the City is an American premium television comedy-drama created by Darren Star. It is an adaptation of the book of the same name written by Candace Bushnell. The show was produced by Darren Star Productions, HBO Original Programming and Warner Bros. Television. The series chronicles the life of Carrie Bradshaw (Sarah Jessica Parker), a sex columnist for the fictional New York Star who explores the world of sex while living in New York City to gather material for her column "Sex and the City". The show also chronicles her relationships with friends Miranda Hobbes (Cynthia Nixon), Samantha Jones (Kim Cattrall) and Charlotte York (Kristin Davis).

Sex and the City aired on the premium television channel HBO from June 6, 1998 to February 22, 2004, broadcasting 94 episodes over six seasons during its initial run. During the series run, the series was nominated for 54 Emmy Awards (winning seven, including Outstanding Comedy Series), 24 Golden Globe Awards (winning eight, including Best Television Series – Musical or Comedy), 11 Screen Actors Guild Awards (winning 3), 10 Directors Guild of America Awards (winning two), 7 Satellite Awards (winning two for Best Television Series – Musical or Comedy), and 4 Producers Guild of America Awards (winning 3). The series garnered various other awards and nominations, recognizing aspects such as directing, producing, casting, and costumes.

Sarah Jessica Parker was nominated for 32 individual awards for her role as Carrie Bradshaw, as well as executive producer of the series, receiving the Emmy Award for Outstanding Lead Actress in a Comedy Series, the Emmy Award for Outstanding comedy series as executive producer, 4 Golden Globe awards for Best Actress – Television Series Musical or Comedy, a SAG Award for Outstanding Performance by a Female Actor in a Comedy Series and two SAG awards for Outstanding Performance by an Ensemble in a Comedy series. Kim Cattrall received 17 award nominations for her role in the series, winning the Golden Globe Award for Best Supporting Actress – Series, Miniseries or Television Film. The series has been nominated for 210 awards, and has won 55.

== Awards and nominations ==
=== American Cinema Editors Awards ===
Year	Category	Nominee(s)	Result	Ref
2001	Best Edited Half-Hour Series for Television	Wendey Stanzler for "Running with Scissors"	Nominated	
2002	Best Edited Half-Hour Series for Television	Michael Berenbaum for "The Real Me"	Won	
2003	Best Edited Half-Hour Series for Television	Wendey Stanzler for "Luck Be an Old Lady"	Won	
2004	Best Edited Half-Hour Series for Television	Michael Berenbaum and Wendey Stanzler for "The Catch"	Nominated	
2005	Best Edited Half-Hour Series for Television	Michael Berenbaum and Wendey Stanzler for "American Girl in Paris - Part Deux"	Nominated	

=== American Comedy Awards ===
Year	Category	Nominee(s)	Result	Ref
2000	Funniest Female Performer in a TV Series (Leading Role) Network, Cable or Syndication	Sarah Jessica Parker	Nominated	
2000	Funniest Supporting Female Performer in a TV Series	Kristin Davis	Nominated	
2001	Funniest Television Series		Nominated	
2001	Funniest Female Performer in a TV Series (Leading Role) Network, Cable or Syndication	Sarah Jessica Parker	Nominated	
2001	Funniest Supporting Female Performer in a TV Series	Kim Cattrall	Nominated	

=== AFI Awards ===
Year	Category	Nominee(s)	Result	Ref
2001	Comedy Series of the Year		Nominated	
2001	Television Programs of the Year		Won	

=== BMI Film & TV Awards ===
Year	Category	Nominee(s)	Result	Ref
2002	BMI Cable Award	Douglas J. Cuomo	Won	
2003	BMI Cable Award	Douglas J. Cuomo	Won	
2004	BMI Cable Award	Douglas J. Cuomo	Won	

=== British Comedy Awards ===
Year	Category	Nominee(s)	Result	Ref
2002	Best International Comedy Show		Nominated	
2004	Best International Comedy Show		Nominated	

=== CINE Golden Eagle Awards ===
Year	Category	Nominee(s)	Result	Ref
1999	Golden Eagle Award for Entertainment	"They Shoot Single People, Don't They"	Won	
2000	Golden Eagle Award for Entertainment	"Ex and the City"	Won	
2001	Golden Eagle Award for Entertainment	"Easy Come, Easy Go"	Won	

=== Costume Designers Guild ===
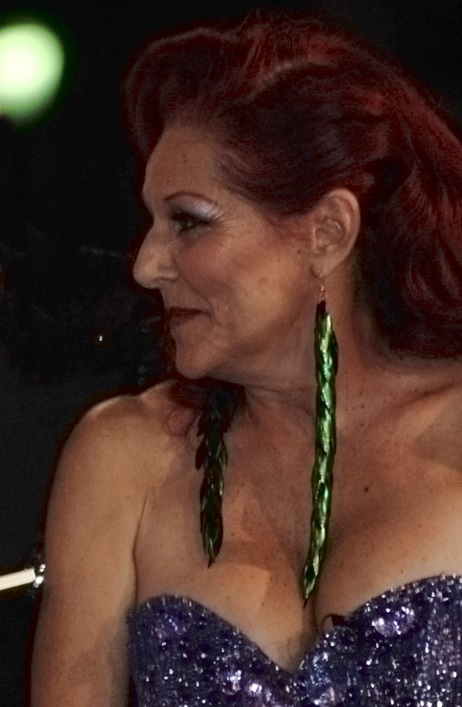
Patricia Field won four Costume Designers Guild Awards during the series' run.

The Costume Designers Guild Award is an annual accolade presented by the Costume Designers Guild, recognizing outstanding achievements by costume designers in film, television and commercials. Costume designer Patricia Field received six nominations for the award for Best Costume Design – Contemporary TV Series, winning four times.

Year	Category	Nominee(s)	Result	Ref
2000	Best Costume Design – Contemporary TV Series	Patricia Field	Won	
2001	Best Costume Design – Contemporary TV Series	Patricia Field	Won	
2002	Best Costume Design – Contemporary TV Series	Patricia Field	Nominated	
2003	Best Costume Design – Contemporary TV Series	Patricia Field	Nominated	
2004	Best Costume Design – Contemporary TV Series	Patricia Field	Won	
2005	Best Costume Design – Contemporary TV Series	Patricia Field	Won	

=== Directors Guild of America Awards ===
The Directors Guild of America Award is an annual accolade presented by the Directors Guild of America, recognizing outstanding achievements in film and television directing, since 1938. Sex and the City has won the award for Outstanding Directing – Comedy Series twice, both for work by Tim Van Patten.

Year	Category	Nominee(s)	Result	Ref
1999	Outstanding Directing – Comedy Series	Victoria Hochberg for "The Man, the Myth, the Viagra"	Nominated	
2000	Outstanding Directing – Comedy Series	Allen Coulter for "Cockadoodle-do"	Nominated	
2001	Outstanding Directing – Comedy Series	Allen Coulter for "Defining Moments"	Nominated	
2001	Outstanding Directing – Comedy Series	Michael Engler for "My Motherboard, My Self"	Nominated	
2001	Outstanding Directing – Comedy Series	Michael Patrick King for "The Real Me"	Nominated	
2002	Outstanding Directing – Comedy Series	Michael Patrick King for "Plus is the Loneliest Number"	Nominated	
2003	Outstanding Directing – Comedy Series	Timothy Van Patten for "Boy Interrupted"	Won	
2003	Outstanding Directing – Comedy Series	Michael Engler for "Hop, Skip & a Week"	Nominated	
2003	Outstanding Directing – Comedy Series	Michael Patrick King for "Great Sexpectations"	Nominated	
2004	Outstanding Directing – Comedy Series	Timothy Van Patten for "An American Girl in Paris: Part Deux"	Won	

=== Emmy Awards ===
In its run, Sex and the City has been nominated for 54 awards. Of those awards, the series has won seven of them, including the award for Outstanding Comedy Series in 2001, Outstanding Directing for a Comedy Series twice in 2002 and 2003, and Outstanding Casting for a Comedy Series twice in 2002 and 2003. Sarah Jessica Parker received a nomination for Outstanding Lead Actress in a Comedy Series every year between 1999 and 2004, winning in 2004. That same year, Cynthia Nixon won the award for Outstanding Supporting Actress in a Comedy Series, after being nominated three times in the past.

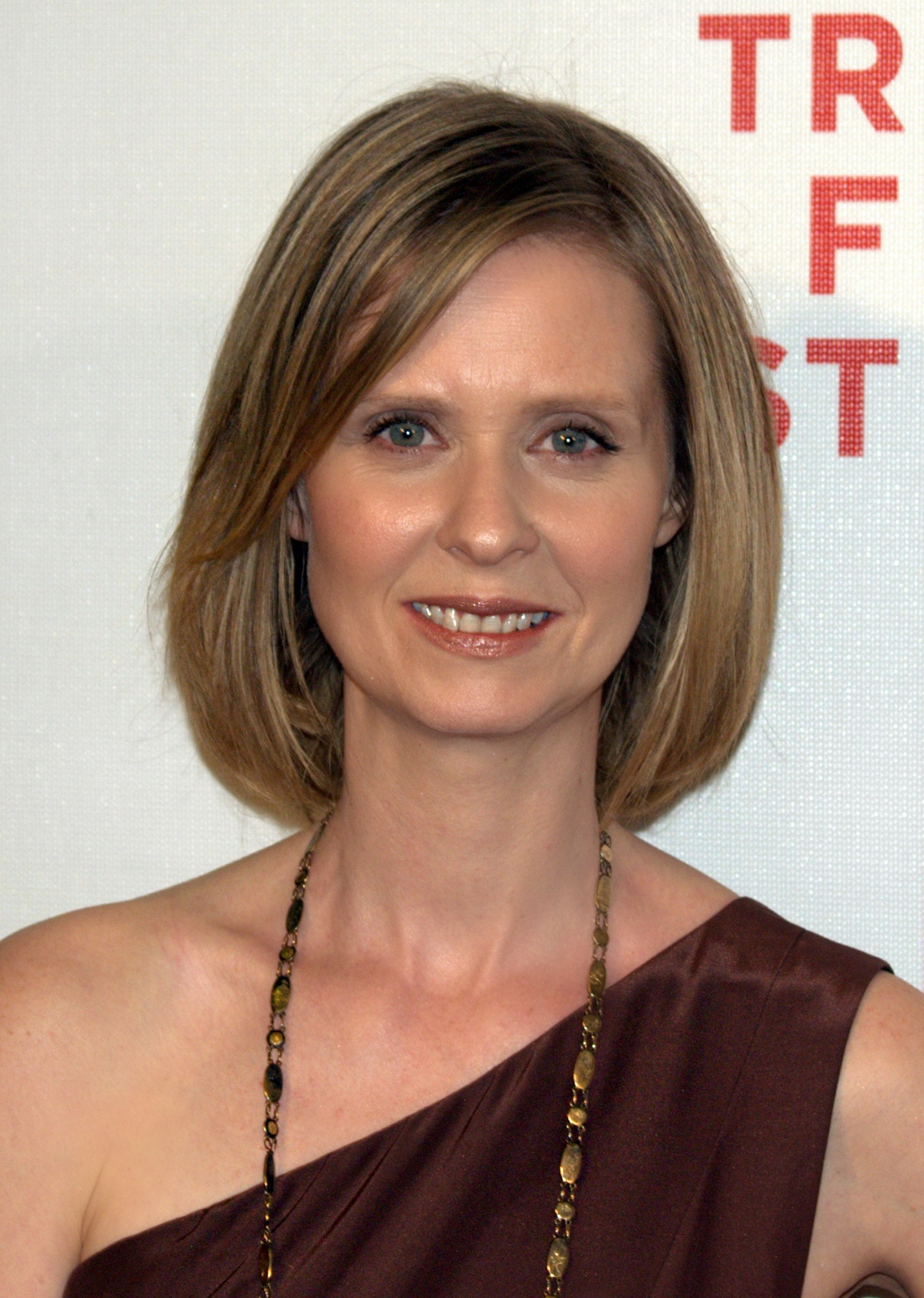
Cynthia Nixon won an Emmy for her role as Miranda Hobbes

==== Primetime Emmy Awards ====
Year	Category	Nominee(s)	Result	Ref
1999	Outstanding Comedy Series		Nominated	
1999	Outstanding Lead Actress in a Comedy Series	Sarah Jessica Parker for "The Drought"	Nominated	
2000	Outstanding Comedy Series		Nominated	
2000	Outstanding Lead Actress in a Comedy Series	Sarah Jessica Parker for "Ex and the City"	Nominated	
2000	Outstanding Supporting Actress in a Comedy Series	Kim Cattrall for "The Awful Truth" and "The Freak Show"	Nominated	
2000	Outstanding Writing for a Comedy Series	Cindy Chupack for "Evolution"	Nominated	
2000	Outstanding Writing for a Comedy Series	Michael Patrick King for "Ex and the City"	Nominated	
2001	Outstanding Comedy Series		Won	
2001	Outstanding Lead Actress in a Comedy Series	Sarah Jessica Parker for "Don't Ask, Don't Tell"	Nominated	
2001	Outstanding Supporting Actress in a Comedy Series	Kim Cattrall for "Where There's Smoke..." and "Running with Scissors"	Nominated	
2001	Outstanding Directing for a Comedy Series	Charles McDougall for "Easy Come, Easy Go"	Nominated	
2001	Outstanding Writing for a Comedy Series	Michael Patrick King for "Easy Come, Easy Go"	Nominated	
2002	Outstanding Comedy Series		Nominated	
2002	Outstanding Lead Actress in a Comedy Series	Sarah Jessica Parker for "The Real Me"	Nominated	
2002	Outstanding Supporting Actress in a Comedy Series	Kim Cattrall for "Belles of the Balls" and "I Heart NY"	Nominated	
2002	Outstanding Supporting Actress in a Comedy Series	Cynthia Nixon for "My Motherboard, My Self" and "Change of a Dress"	Nominated	
2002	Outstanding Guest Actress in a Comedy Series	Frances Sternhagen	Nominated	
2002	Outstanding Directing for a Comedy Series	Michael Patrick King for "The Real Me"	Won	
2002	Outstanding Writing for a Comedy Series	Julie Rottenberg and Elisa Zuritsky for "My Motherboard, My Self"	Nominated	
2003	Outstanding Comedy Series		Nominated	
2003	Outstanding Lead Actress in a Comedy Series	Sarah Jessica Parker for "Anchors Away"	Nominated	
2003	Outstanding Supporting Actress in a Comedy Series	Kim Cattrall for "Cover Girl" and "Critical Condition"	Nominated	
2003	Outstanding Supporting Actress in a Comedy Series	Cynthia Nixon for "Anchors Away" and "Cover Girl"	Nominated	
2003	Outstanding Directing for a Comedy Series	Michael Engler for "I Love a Charade"	Nominated	
2003	Outstanding Writing for a Comedy Series	Cindy Chupack and Michael Patrick King for "I Love a Charade"	Nominated	
2004	Outstanding Comedy Series		Nominated	
2004	Outstanding Lead Actress in a Comedy Series	Sarah Jessica Parker for "An American Girl in Paris: Part Deux"	Won	
2004	Outstanding Supporting Actress in a Comedy Series	Cynthia Nixon for "One" and "The Ick Factor"	Won	
2004	Outstanding Supporting Actress in a Comedy Series	Kim Cattrall for "Out of the Frying Pan" and "An American Girl in Paris: Part Une"	Nominated	
2004	Outstanding Supporting Actress in a Comedy Series	Kristin Davis for "Hop, Skip, and a Week" and "Splat!"	Nominated	
2004	Outstanding Directing for a Comedy Series	Timothy Van Patten for "An American Girl in Paris: Part Deux"	Nominated	
2004	Outstanding Writing for a Comedy Series	Julie Rottenberg and Elisa Zuritsky for "The Ick Factor"	Nominated	

==== Creative Arts Emmy Awards ====
Year	Category	Nominee(s)	Result	Ref
2000	Outstanding Art Direction for a Single-Camera Series	Jeremy Conway, Ed Check, Karin Wiesel for "They Shoot Single People, Don't They"	Nominated	
2000	Outstanding Casting for a Comedy Series	Billy Hopkins, Jennifer McNamara, Kerry Barden, Suzanne Smith	Nominated	
2000	Outstanding Costumes for a Series	Patricia Field, Rebecca Weinberg, Molly Rogers for "La Douleur Exquise!"	Nominated	
2000	Outstanding Sound Mixing for a Comedy Series or a Special	T.J. O'Mara, Bob Chefalas, Paul J. Zydel for "Ex and the City"	Nominated	
2001	Outstanding Art Direction for a Single Camera Series	Jeremy Conway, Ed Check, Karin Wiesel for "Where There's Smoke..."	Nominated	
2001	Outstanding Casting for a Comedy Series	Jennifer McNamara	Nominated	
2001	Outstanding Costumes for a Series	Patricia Field, Rebecca Weinberg, Molly Rogers, Kevin Draves for "Sex and Another City"	Nominated	
2001	Outstanding Hairstyling for a Series	Michelle Johnson, Jacques Stephane Lempire, Sacha Quarles for "All or Nothing"	Nominated	
2001	Outstanding Makeup for a Series	Judy Chin, Marjorie Durand, Nicki Ledermann for "Don't Ask, Don't Tell"	Nominated	
2002	Outstanding Casting for a Comedy Series	Jennifer McNamara	Won	
2002	Outstanding Costumes for a Series	Patricia Field, Rebecca Weinberg, Artie Hach, Eric Daman, Molly Rogers, Mark Agnes for "Defining Moments"	Won	
2002	Outstanding Hairstyling for a Series	Michelle Johnson, Angel De Angelis, Sacha Quarles, Suzana Neziri for "Ghost Town"	Nominated	
2003	Outstanding Single-Camera Picture Editing for a Comedy Series	Michael Berenbaum for "Luck Be an Old Lady"	Nominated	
2003	Outstanding Single-Camera Picture Editing for a Comedy Series	Wendey Stanzler for "Anchors Away"	Nominated	
2003	Outstanding Casting for a Comedy Series	Jennifer McNamara	Won	
2003	Outstanding Costumes for a Series	Patricia Field, Patricia Trujillo, Wendy Stefanelli, Molly Rogers, Mark Agnes for "I Love a Charade"	Nominated	
2003	Outstanding Hairstyling for a Series	Wayne Herndon, Mandy Lyons, Suzana Neziri, Donna Marie Fischetto for "Plus One is the Loneliest Number"	Nominated	
2003	Outstanding Makeup for a Series (Non-Prosthetic)	Judy Chin, Nicki Ledermann, Kerrie R. Plant, Maryann Marchetti for "Plus One is the Loneliest Number"	Nominated	
2004	Outstanding Single-Camera Picture Editing for a Comedy Series	Michael Berenbaum and Wendey Stanzler for "An American Girl In Paris (Part Une & Part Deux)"	Nominated	
2004	Outstanding Casting for a Comedy Series	Jennifer McNamara	Nominated	
2004	Outstanding Costumes for a Series	Patricia Field, Molly Rogers, Patricia Trujillo, Wendy Stefanelli, Mark Agnes, Mei Lai Hippisley Coxe for "An American Girl In Paris (Part Deux)"	Nominated	

=== GLAAD Media Awards ===
Year	Category	Nominee(s)	Result	Ref
2000	Outstanding Comedy Series		Nominated	
2002	Outstanding Comedy Series		Nominated	
2003	Outstanding Comedy Series		Nominated	
2004	Outstanding Comedy Series		Won	

=== Golden Globe Awards ===
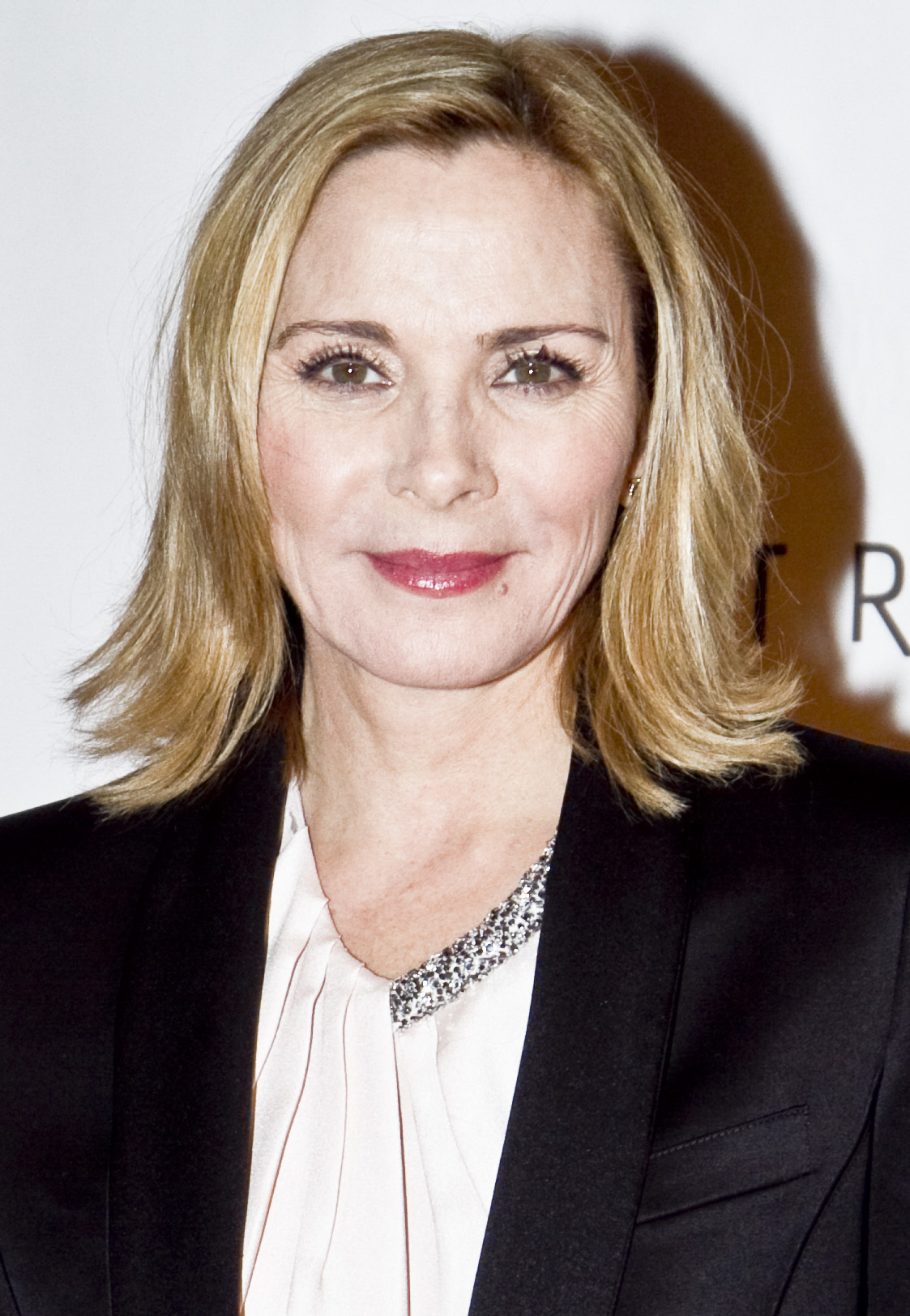
Kim Cattrall won the award for Best Supporting Actress – Series, Miniseries, or Television Film in 2003

The Golden Globe Award is an annual accolade bestowed by members of the Hollywood Foreign Press Association recognizing outstanding achievements in film and television. Sex and the City received 24 award nominations, winning eight of them, including the award for Best Television Series – Musical or Comedy from 2000-2002.

Year	Category	Nominee(s)	Result	Ref
1998	Best Actress – Television Series Musical or Comedy	Sarah Jessica Parker as Carrie Bradshaw	Nominated	
1999	Best Television Series – Musical or Comedy		Won	
1999	Best Actress – Television Series Musical or Comedy	Sarah Jessica Parker as Carrie Bradshaw	Won	
1999	Best Supporting Actress – Series, Miniseries or Television Film	Kim Cattrall as Samantha Jones	Nominated	
1999	Best Supporting Actress – Series, Miniseries or Television Film	Cynthia Nixon as Miranda Hobbes	Nominated	
1999	Best Supporting Actor – Series, Miniseries or Television Film	Chris Noth as Mr. Big	Nominated	
2000	Best Television Series – Musical or Comedy		Won	
2000	Best Actress – Television Series Musical or Comedy	Sarah Jessica Parker as Carrie Bradshaw	Won	
2000	Best Supporting Actress – Series, Miniseries or Television Film	Kim Cattrall as Samantha Jones	Nominated	
2000	Best Supporting Actress – Series, Miniseries or Television Film	Cynthia Nixon as Miranda Hobbes	Nominated	
2001	Best Television Series – Musical or Comedy		Won	
2001	Best Actress – Television Series Musical or Comedy	Sarah Jessica Parker as Carrie Bradshaw	Won	
2001	Best Supporting Actor – Series, Miniseries or Television Film	John Corbett as Aidan Shaw	Nominated	
2002	Best Television Series – Musical or Comedy		Nominated	
2002	Best Actress – Television Series Musical or Comedy	Sarah Jessica Parker as Carrie Bradshaw	Nominated	
2002	Best Supporting Actress – Series, Miniseries or Television Film	Kim Cattrall as Samantha Jones	Won	
2002	Best Supporting Actress – Series, Miniseries or Television Film	Cynthia Nixon as Miranda Hobbes	Nominated	
2003	Best Television Series – Musical or Comedy		Nominated	
2003	Best Actress – Television Series Musical or Comedy	Sarah Jessica Parker as Carrie Bradshaw	Won	
2003	Best Supporting Actress – Series, Miniseries or Television Film	Kim Cattrall as Samantha Jones	Nominated	
2003	Best Supporting Actress – Series, Miniseries or Television Film	Kristin Davis as Charlotte York	Nominated	
2003	Best Supporting Actress – Series, Miniseries or Television Film	Cynthia Nixon as Miranda Hobbes	Nominated	
2004	Best Television Series – Musical or Comedy		Nominated	
2004	Best Actress – Television Series Musical or Comedy	Sarah Jessica Parker as Carrie Bradshaw	Nominated	

=== Golden Reel Awards ===
Year	Category	Nominee(s)	Result	Ref
2002	Best Sound Editing in Television - Dialogue & ADR, Episodic	Anthony J. Ciccolini III, Bitty O'Sullivan-Smith, and Louis Bertini for "My Motherboard, My Self"	Nominated	
2004	Best Sound Editing in Television Episodic - Music	Dan Lieberstein and Missy Cohen for "Great Sexpectations"	Nominated	
2005	Best Sound Editing in Television Short Form - Dialogue & ADR	Louis Bertini, Anthony J. Ciccolini III and Pam DeMetruis-Thomas for "An American Girl in Paris (Part Deux)"	Nominated	
2005	Best Sound Editing in Television Episodic - Music	Dan Lieberstein and Missy Cohen for "An American Girl in Paris (Part Deux)"	Won	

=== Gracie Awards ===
Year	Category	Nominee(s)	Result	Ref
2004	Outstanding Entertainment Program - Comedy		Won	
2005	Outstanding Entertainment Program - Comedy		Won	

=== Online Film & Television Association ===
Year	Category	Nominee(s)	Result	Ref
1999	Best New Comedy Series		Nominated	
1999	Best Cable Series		Nominated	
1999	Best Guest Actor in a Cable Series	Timothy Olyphant	Nominated	
1999	Best Guest Actress in a Cable Series	Marian Seldes	Nominated	
1999	Best Ensemble in a Cable Series		Nominated	
1999	Best Direction in a Cable Series		Nominated	
1999	Best Writing in a Cable Series		Nominated	
2000	Best Comedy Series		Nominated	
2000	Best Actress in a Comedy Series	Sarah Jessica Parker	Won	
2000	Best Supporting Actress in a Comedy Series	Kim Cattrall	Nominated	
2000	Best Ensemble in a Comedy Series		Nominated	
2000	Best Direction in a Comedy Series		Nominated	
2000	Best Writing in a Comedy Series		Nominated	
2000	Best Lighting in a Series		Nominated	
2000	Best Costume Design in a Series		Nominated	
2000	Best Episode of a Comedy Series	"They Shoot People, Don't They?"	Nominated	
2001	Best Actress in a Comedy Series	Sarah Jessica Parker	Nominated	
2001	Best Direction in a Comedy Series		Nominated	
2001	Best Writing in a Comedy Series		Nominated	
2002	Best Supporting Actress in a Comedy Series	Cynthia Nixon	Won	
2002	Best Guest Actress in a Comedy Series	Candice Bergen	Nominated	
2002	Best Guest Actress in a Comedy Series	Margaret Cho	Nominated	
2002	Best Ensemble in a Comedy Series		Nominated	
2003	Best Supporting Actress in a Comedy Series	Sarah Jessica Parker	Nominated	
2003	Best Costume Design in a Series		Nominated	
2004	Best Supporting Actress in a Comedy Series	Sarah Jessica Parker	Nominated	
2004	Best Supporting Actress in a Comedy Series	Kim Cattrall	Nominated	
2004	Best Supporting Actress in a Comedy Series	Cynthia Nixon	Nominated	
2004	Best Ensemble in a Comedy Series		Nominated	
2004	Best Lighting in a Series	"An American Girl in Paris"	Nominated	
2004	Best Costume Design in a Series	"An American Girl in Paris (Part Deux)"	Nominated	
2004	Best Makeup/Hairstyling in a Series	"An American Girl in Paris"	Nominated	

=== Prism Awards ===
Year	Category	Nominee(s)	Result	Ref
2001	Television Comedy Series Storyline	"Quitting Smoking?"	Won	
2001	PRISM Commendations	"What Goes Around Comes Around"	Won	

=== Producers Guild Golden Laurel Awards (PGA) ===
Year	Category	Nominee(s)	Result	Ref
2001	Episodic Television Series – Comedy	Jenny Bicks, Michael Patrick King, John P. Melfi, Darren Star	Won	
2002	Episodic Television Series – Comedy	Cindy Chupack, Michael Patrick King, John P. Melfi, Sarah Jessica Parker	Won	
2003	Episodic Television Series – Comedy	Cindy Chupack, Michael Patrick King, John P. Melfi, Sarah Jessica Parker	Nominated	
2004	Episodic Television Series – Comedy	Jenny Bicks, Cindy Chupack, Michael Patrick King, John P. Melfi, Sarah Jessica Parker, Jane Raab	Won	
2005	Episodic Television Series – Comedy	Jenny Bicks, Cindy Chupack, Michael Patrick King, John P. Melfi, Sarah Jessica Parker, Jane Raab	Nominated	

=== Satellite Awards ===
Year	Category	Nominee(s)	Result	Ref
1999	Best Television Series – Musical or Comedy		Nominated	
2000	Best Television Series – Musical or Comedy		Won	
2001	Best Television Series – Musical or Comedy		Won	
2002	Best Supporting Actress – Television Series	Cynthia Nixon as Miranda Hobbes	Nominated	
2002	Best Supporting Actor – Television Series	Chris Noth as Mr. Big	Nominated	
2003	Best Television Series – Musical or Comedy		Nominated	
2003	Best Supporting Actress – Television Series	Kim Cattrall as Samantha Jones	Nominated	

=== Screen Actors Guild Awards ===
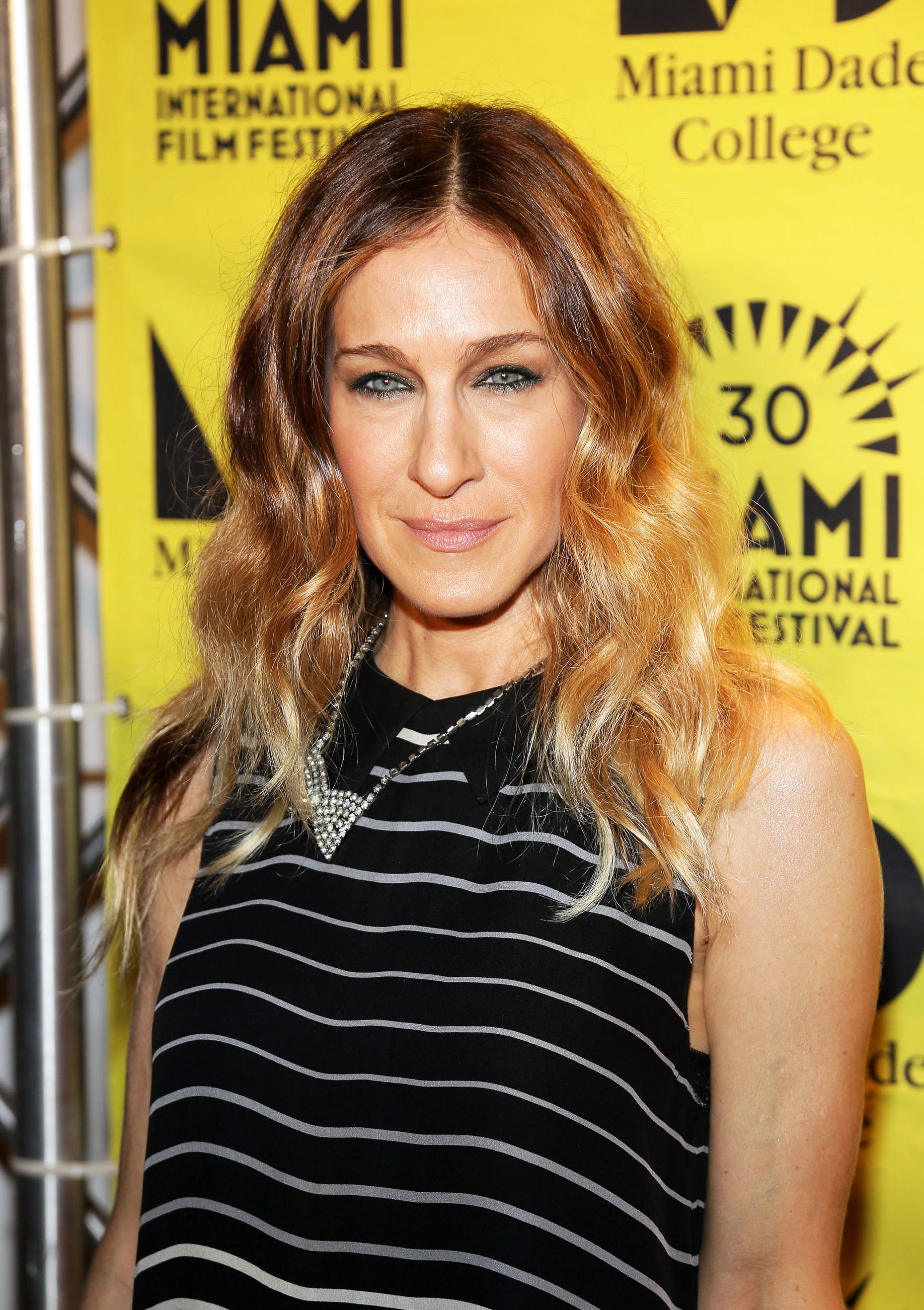
Sarah Jessica Parker won the award for Outstanding Performance by a Female Actor in a Comedy Series in 2000.

Year	Category	Nominee(s)	Result	Ref
1999	Outstanding Performance by a Female Actor in a Comedy Series	Sarah Jessica Parker as Carrie Bradshaw	Nominated	
2000	Outstanding Performance by a Female Actor in a Comedy Series	Sarah Jessica Parker as Carrie Bradshaw	Won	
2000	Outstanding Performance by an Ensemble in a Comedy Series	Kim Cattrall, Kristin Davis, Cynthia Nixon, Sarah Jessica Parker	Nominated	
2001	Outstanding Performance by a Female Actor in a Comedy Series	Kim Cattrall as Samantha Jones	Nominated	
2001	Outstanding Performance by a Female Actor in a Comedy Series	Sarah Jessica Parker as Carrie Bradshaw	Nominated	
2001	Outstanding Performance by an Ensemble in a Comedy Series	Kim Cattrall, Kristin Davis, Cynthia Nixon, Sarah Jessica Parker	Won	
2002	Outstanding Performance by a Female Actor in a Comedy Series	Kim Cattrall as Samantha Jones	Nominated	
2002	Outstanding Performance by an Ensemble in a Comedy Series	Kim Cattrall, Kristin Davis, Cynthia Nixon, Sarah Jessica Parker	Nominated	
2003	Outstanding Performance by an Ensemble in a Comedy Series	Kim Cattrall, Kristin Davis, Cynthia Nixon, Sarah Jessica Parker	Won	
2004	Outstanding Performance by a Female Actor in a Comedy Series	Sarah Jessica Parker as Carrie Bradshaw	Nominated	
2004	Outstanding Performance by an Ensemble in a Comedy Series	Kim Cattrall, Kristin Davis, Cynthia Nixon, Sarah Jessica Parker	Nominated	

=== Television Critics Association Awards ===
Year	Category	Nominee(s)	Result	Ref
2000	Program of the Year		Nominated	
2000	Outstanding Achievement in Comedy		Nominated	
2001	Outstanding Achievement in Comedy		Nominated	
2004	Outstanding Achievement in Comedy		Nominated	

=== Writers Guild of America (WGA) ===
Year	Category	Nominee(s)	Result	Ref
1999	Award for Television: Episodic Comedy	Cindy Chupack for "Evolution"	Nominated	
1999	Award for Television: Episodic Comedy	Jenny Bicks for "Four Women and a Funeral"	Nominated	
2000	Award for Television: Episodic Comedy	Cindy Chupack for "Attack of the 5' 10" Woman"	Nominated	
2000	Award for Television: Episodic Comedy	Michael Patrick King for "Ex and the City"	Nominated	
2001	Award for Television: Episodic Comedy	Cindy Chupack for "Just Say Yes"	Nominated	
2001	Award for Television: Episodic Comedy	Julie Rottenberg & Elisa Zuritsky for "My Motherboard, My Self"	Nominated	
2002	Award for Television: Episodic Comedy	Cindy Chupack for "Plus is the Loneliest Number"	Nominated	
2002	Award for Television: Episodic Comedy	Michael Patrick King for "I Heart N.Y."	Nominated	
2002	Award for Television: Episodic Comedy	Julie Rottenberg & Elisa Zuritsky for "Change of a Dress"	Nominated	
2003	Award for Television: Episodic Comedy	Jenny Bicks for "A Woman's Right to Shoes"	Nominated	
2004	Award for Television: Episodic Comedy	Jenny Bicks & Cindy Chupack for "Splat!"	Nominated	
2004	Award for Television: Episodic Comedy	Julie Rottenberg & Elisa Zuritsky for "The Ick Factor"	Nominated	

=== Other awards ===
Award	Year	Category	Nominee	Result	Ref
Chris Awards	1999	Bronze Plaque Award – Entertainment		Won	
Makeup Artist & Hairstylist Guild Awards	2003	Best Contemporary Makeup - Television Series	Nicki Ledermann, Judy Chin, Kerrie R. Plant, and Maryann Marchetti	Nominated	
Makeup Artist & Hairstylist Guild Awards	2003	Best Contemporary Hair Styling - Television Series	Wayne Herndon, Donna Marie Fischetto, and Suzana Neziri	Won	
Makeup Artist & Hairstylist Guild Awards	2004	Best Contemporary Makeup - Television Series	Judy Chin, Nicki Ledermann, and Kerrie R. Plant	Won	
Makeup Artist & Hairstylist Guild Awards	2004	Best Contemporary Hair Styling - Television Series	Mandy Lyons, Donna Marie Fischetto, and Peggy Schierholz	Won	
Monte Carlo Television Festival	2002	Outstanding International Producer	Michael Patrick King, Sarah Jessica Parker, Cindy Chupack, John P. Melfi	Won	
Monte Carlo Television Festival	2002	Outstanding Actress	Sarah Jessica Parker	Won	
NAACP Image Award	2004	Outstanding Supporting Actor in a Comedy Series	Blair Underwood	Nominated	
NAACP Image Award	2005	Outstanding Supporting Actor in a Comedy Series	Blair Underwood	Nominated	
NAMIC Vision Awards	2004	Best Comedic Performance	Blair Underwood	Nominated	
SHINE Awards	2000	Scene Stealer	"Attack of the 5'10" Woman"	Won	
SHINE Awards	2002	Comedy Episode	"Coulda, Woulda, Shoulda"	Won	
Women's Image Network Awards (WIN)	2001	TV Comedy Series Actress	Cynthia Nixon for "My Motherboard, My Self"	Won	
