= Water Boys 2 =

Japanese drama series

- Genre: Romantic Comedy, Sports
- Starring: Hayato Ichihara; Satomi Ishihara; Akiyoshi Nakao; Keita Saitō; Teppei Koike
- Opening theme: Niji (虹)
- Country of origin: Japan
- Original language: Japanese
- No. of episodes: 12

Production
- Producers: Kōichi Funatsu; Yukiko Yanagawa

Original release
- Network: Fuji TV
- Release: July 6 – September 21, 2004

Related
- Water Boys; Water Boys 2005 Natsu

Water Boys 2 (ウォーターボーイズ2, Wōtā Bōizu Tsū) is a Japanese drama series aired in Japan on Fuji Television in 2004. The series is very closely related in style to the first season of Water Boys, except set in a girls school.

== Story ==
Three years ago, the former all-girl Himeno High School opened its doors to male students, but the school still retains its female-dominated environment as the school still has a majority female population. Eikichi Mizushima transfers into the school from a prestigious Aoba High School in Tokyo, where he was previously a member of the swimming team, to be with his grandfather, Kamekichi, while his father was away in New York City starting a new business.

Yōsuke Yamamoto always wanted to have a boys' sports club in the school and, when he heard about Eikichi's involvement with the swim club, decided to make his own. Starting from scratch, the boys must go through similar hardships to start their own swimming club, except this time they have a strong opposition of the female presence.

== Cast ==
- Eikichi Mizushima - Hayato Ichihara
- Shiori Yazawa - Satomi Ishihara
- Yosuke Yamamoto - Akiyoshi Nakao
- Senichi Kawasaki - Keita Saitō
- Iwata Iwao - Teppei Koike
- Hideki Sano - Ryo Kimura
- Hijiri Saotome - Takatoshi Kaneko
- Natsuko Ohara - Sayaka Yamaguchi
- Kayo Oba - Reina Asami
- Haruka Koshino - Waka Inoue
- Kozue Kitagawa - Emi Suzuki
- Reiko Kashiyama - Midoriko Kimura
- Kamekichi Mizushima - Masao Imafuku
- Kaoru Yazawa - Aiko Morishita
- Akira Yazawa - Fumiyo Kohinata
- Kozo Kasuya - Shiro Sano
- Yoko Oshima
- Kiwako Ashikawa - Sachie Hara
