= Unnatural (TV series) =

- Also known as: Unnatural
- Genre: Forensic; Drama
- Written by: Akiko Nogi
- Directed by: Ayuko Tsukahara; Kentaro Takemura; Yoshiaki Murao
- Starring: Satomi Ishihara; Arata Iura; Masataka Kubota; Mikako Ichikawa; Yutaka Matsushige
- Ending theme: Lemon by Kenshi Yonezu
- Composer: Masahiro Tokuda
- Country of origin: Japan
- Original language: Japanese
- No. of episodes: 10

Production
- Producers: Junko Arai (Dreamax Television); Hiroki Ueda (TBS)
- Running time: 54 minutes
- Production companies: Dreamax Television; TBS Drama Production

Original release
- Network: TBS
- Release: January 12 – March 16, 2018

Unnatural (アンナチュラル; Unnatural) is a 2018 Japanese television drama, starring Satomi Ishihara, Arata Iura, Masataka Kubota, Mikako Ichikawa and Yutaka Matsushige. It aired every Friday at 22:00 (JST) on TBS from January 12, 2018, to March 16, 2018.

It won Excellent Award at the International Drama Festival in Tokyo, as well as several awards including Best Drama and Director Award during the 96th Television Drama Academy Awards.

== Plot ==
Mikoto Misumi is a forensic doctor working at the Unnatural Death Investigation Laboratory (UDI Lab), a fictional facility recently established by the Ministry of Health, Labour and Welfare. Together with her colleagues, she solves cases involving deaths arising from unnatural circumstances.

== Characters ==
- Satomi Ishihara as Mikoto Misumi:

A 33-year-old forensic doctor who has accumulated experience of dissecting about 1,500 bodies at the UDI Lab.

- Arata Iura as Kei Nakado:

A 41-year-old forensic doctor who has accumulated experience of dissecting about 3,000 bodies at the UDI Lab.

- Masataka Kubota as Rokuro Kube:

A 26-year-old recorder on Misumi's team.

- Mikako Ichikawa as Yuko Shoji:

A 35-year-old technician on Misumi's team.

- Yutaka Matsushige as Yasuo Kamikura:

The 55-year-old director of UDI Lab, and former high ranking official of Ministry of Health, Labour and Welfare.

== Episodes ==
Episode	Original air date	Title	Subtitle	Directed by	Ratings	Note
1	January 12, 2018	Nameless Poison /名前のない毒	Nameless Poison... Solve the Mystery of Continuous Unnatural Death /名前のない毒...連続不自然死の謎を解け	Ayuko Tsukahara	12.7%	Extended for 15 minutes
2	January 19, 2018	Suicide Note /死にたがりの手紙	Forced Suicide of the Whole Family... Truth of the Case Pretending to be Suicide!? /一家無理心中...自殺に見せかけた事件の真相!?	Ayuko Tsukahara	13.1%	
3	January 26, 2018	Unexpected Witness /予定外の証人	Can the innocent man be saved? Trial of winning rate 0.01% /無実の男を救えるか? 勝率0.01%の逆転裁判	Kentaro Takemura	10.6%	
4	February 2, 2018	Who To Work for /誰がために働く	Mysterious Death by Traffic Accident!? The Husband Killed by an Unscrupulous Company! /謎の交通事故死!? ブラック企業に殺された夫!	Ayuko Tsukahara	11.4%	
5	February 9, 2018	Vengeance of Death /死の報復	Stolen body!?Late Wife Commits Suicide?Murdered? /盗まれたご遺体!? 亡き妻は自殺か? 他殺か?	Ayuko Tsukahara	9.0%	
6	February 16, 2018	Not Friends /友達じゃない	Mysterious Celebrity Party Serial Murder... Colleague is one of the suspects!? /謎のセレブパーティ連続殺人...同僚が容疑者!?	Kentaro Takemura	10.1%	
7	February 23, 2018	Murder Game /殺人遊戯	Live broadcast of murderer online!? Save the Captive Hostage /殺人犯がネットで生中継!? 囚われた人質を救え	Yoshiaki Murao	9.3%	
8	March 2, 2018	My Far Away Home /遥かなる我が家	Mysterious Building Fire! The Final Message of the Burned Body /謎のビル火災! 焼死体が語る最後のメッセージ	Ayuko Tsukahara	10.5%	
9	March 9, 2018	Appearance of enemy /敵の姿	The Serial Murderer is Nearby! Uncover the Truth Hid for 8 Years /連続殺人犯は近くにいた! 8年越しに掴む真実	Kentaro Takemura	10.6%	
10	March 16, 2018	End of the Journey /旅の終わり	Crisis of Collapse... Last Battle of UDI Members /崩壊の危機...UDIメンバー最後の戦い	Ayuko Tsukahara	13.3%	Extended for 10 minutes
Average rating 11.1% (Ratings are calculated by Video Research in the Kanto region)

== Accolades ==
Award	Category	Nominee(s)	Result
Galaxy Award	2018 March Monthly Award	Unnatural	Won
Galaxy Award	55th Galaxy Award	Unnatural	Won
44th Hoso Bunka Foundation Prize	Grand Prix	Unnatural	Won
International Drama Festival in Tokyo 2018	Excellent Award	Unnatural	Won
International Drama Festival in Tokyo 2018	Best Actress	Satomi Ishihara	Won
International Drama Festival in Tokyo 2018	Best Screenplay	Akiko Nogi	Won
International Drama Festival in Tokyo 2018	Special Award	Unnatural Production Team	Won
International Drama Festival in Tokyo 2018	Theme Song	"Lemon" Yonezu Kenshi	Won
11th Confidence Award Drama Prize	Best drama	Unnatural	Won
11th Confidence Award Drama Prize	Best Actress	Satomi Ishihara	Won
11th Confidence Award Drama Prize	Best Supporting Actor	Arata Iura	Won
11th Confidence Award Drama Prize	Best Screenplay	Akiko Nogi	Won
96th Drama Academy Awards	Best Drama	Unnatural	Won
96th Drama Academy Awards	Best Actress	Satomi Ishihara	Won
96th Drama Academy Awards	Best Supporting Actor	Arata Iura	Won
96th Drama Academy Awards	Theme Song	"Lemon" Yonezu Kenshi	Won
96th Drama Academy Awards	Best Director	Ayuko Tsukahara, Kentaro Takemura, Yoshiaki Murao	Won
96th Drama Academy Awards	Best Screenplay	Akiko Nogi	Won
Confidence Award Drama Prize 2018	Best Actress	Satomi Ishihara	Won
Confidence Award Drama Prize 2018	Best Screenplay	Akiko Nogi	Won
