= My Happy Marriage =

Japanese light novel series

- First light novel volume cover, featuring Miyo Saimori (left) and Kiyoka Kudou (right)

わたしの幸せな結婚 (Watashi no Shiawase na Kekkon)
- Genre: Drama; Romance; Historical fantasy
- Novel series
- Written by: Akumi Agitogi
- Published by: Shōsetsuka ni Narō
- Light novel
- Written by: Akumi Agitogi
- Illustrated by: Tsukiho Tsukioka
- Published by: Fujimi Shobo
- English publisher: NA: Yen Press
- Imprint: Fujimi L Bunko
- Original run: January 15, 2019 – present
- Volumes: 10
- Manga
- Written by: Akumi Agitogi
- Illustrated by: Rito Kohsaka
- Published by: Square Enix
- English publisher: NA: Square Enix Manga & Books
- Magazine: Gangan Online
- Original run: December 20, 2018 – present
- Volumes: 6
- Live-action film
- Directed by: Ayuko Tsukahara
- Written by: Tomoe Kanno
- Music by: Akiyuki Tateyama
- Studio: TBS Sparkle
- Released: March 17, 2023
- Runtime: 115 minutes
- Anime television series
- Directed by: Takehiro Kubota; Masayuki Kojima (S2)
- Written by: Ami Satō; Takahito Ōnishi (S1); Momoka Toyoda (S1) (Note: Credited for both Series Composition (シリーズ構成) and Screenplay (脚本) for the first season, and only the latter for the second season)
- Music by: Evan Call
- Studio: Kinema Citrus
- Licensed by: Netflix: CN: Bilibili
- Original network: Tokyo MX, SUN, KBS Kyoto, TV Aichi, AT-X, BS11
- Original run: July 5, 2023 – April 9, 2025
- Episodes: 26
- icon

My Happy Marriage (Japanese: わたしの幸せな結婚, Hepburn: Watashi no Shiawase na Kekkon) is a Japanese light novel series written by Akumi Agitogi and illustrated by Tsukiho Tsukioka. Initially published online via the user-generated novel publishing website Shōsetsuka ni Narō, it was later acquired by Fujimi Shobo, who has released the series since January 2019 under their Fujimi L Bunko imprint.

A manga adaptation illustrated by Rito Kohsaka has been serialized in Square Enix's Gangan Online service since December 2018. A live-action film adaptation premiered in Japan in March 2023. An anime television series produced by Kinema Citrus aired from July to September 2023. A second season aired from January to April 2025. A three-episode anime special aired in October 2026.

== Synopsis ==
In an alternative version of the Taishō era in which spirits and magic are real, but in decline, Miyo Saimori, born without supernatural talent, is forced into an existence of servitude by her abusive stepmother. When Miyo finally comes of marriageable age, though, her hopes of being whisked away to a better life crumble after she discovers her fiancé is Kiyoka Kudou, a commander apparently so cold and cruel that his previous would-be brides all fled within three days of their engagements. With no home to return to, Miyo resigns herself to her fate—and soon finds that her pale and handsome husband-to-be is anything but the monster she expected. As they slowly open their hearts to each other, both realize the other may be their chance at finding true love and happiness.

== Media ==
=== Light novels ===
Written by Akumi Agitogi, My Happy Marriage began publication online via the user-generated novel publishing website Shōsetsuka ni Narō. The series was later acquired by Fujimi Shobo, who began publishing the novels with illustrations by Tsukiho Tsukioka on January 15, 2019, under their Fujimi L Bunko imprint. As of March 2026, ten volumes have been released. To advertise the fourth volume of the novel, three promotional videos were released on September 15, 2020, featuring the voices of Kaito Ishikawa, Reina Ueda, and Yuki Yagi as Kiyoka, Miyo and Kaya, respectively. In June 2021, Yen Press announced that it licensed the novels for English publication.

==== Volumes ====
No.	Original release date	Original ISBN	English release date	English ISBN
1	January 15, 2019	978-4-04-073019-6	January 18, 2022	978-1-9753-3500-7
Prologue; Chapter 1: Of Our Meeting and My Tears; Chapter 2: The First Date; Chapter 3: A Gift for My Fiancé; Chapter 4: Choosing Defiance; Chapter 5: Endings and New Beginnings; Epilogue
2	July 13, 2019	978-4-04-073253-4	July 12, 2022	978-1-9753-3502-1
Prologue; Chapter 1: Nightmares and Disquieting Shadows; Chapter 2: The Chestnut-Haired Man; Chapter 3: To the Usuba Household; Chapter 4: Light in the Darkness; Chapter 5: Truth-Revealing Party; Epilogue
3	February 15, 2020	978-4-04-073473-6	November 22, 2022	978-1-9753-3504-5
Prologue; Chapter 1: Father-in-Law and His Invitation; Chapter 2: Quivering, Embarrassed; Chapter 3: Confrontation with Mother-in-Law; Chapter 4: Circling Emotions; Chapter 5: Something Closing In; Chapter 6: Once Spring Has Come; Epilogue
4	September 15, 2020	978-4-04-073725-6	June 20, 2023	978-1-9753-3506-9
Prologue; Chapter 1: Scars and Precaution; Chapter 2: Her First Friend; Chapter 3: How to Spend Time with a Friend; Chapter 4: Genuine Emotions Deep Inside; Chapter 5: Without Fear; Chapter 6: Feelings Going Forward; Epilogue
5	July 15, 2021	978-4-04-073948-9	October 17, 2023	978-1-9753-6735-0
Prologue; Chapter 1: A New Year's Commotion; Chapter 2: The Imperial Palace and a Restless Day; Chapter 3: Night; Chapter 4: The Past Within Dreams; Epilogue
6	July 15, 2022	978-4-04-074601-2	February 20, 2024	978-1-9753-7529-4
Prologue; Chapter 1: Snowy Path; Chapter 2: Know the Heart; Chapter 3: Beyond the Closed Dream; Chapter 4: The First...; Epilogue
7	July 14, 2023	978-4-04-075039-2	August 20, 2024	978-1-9753-9156-0
Prologue; Chapter 1: Charm; Chapter 2: Heart Flutter; Chapter 3: Watched Over by Cherry Blossoms; Chapter 4: Marriage Vows; Chapter 5: What Happiness Is; Epilogue
8	March 15, 2024	978-4-04-075110-8; 978-4-04-075111-5 (SE)	January 21, 2025	979-8-8554-1110-2
When the Long Rains Abate; First Vignette Coffer; Proof of Love; Second Vignette Coffer
9	March 14, 2025	978-4-04-075697-4	March 10, 2026	979-8-8554-2900-8
Prologue; Chapter 1: A Premonition; Chapter 2: The Old Capital and New Encounters; Chapter 3: The Miyakouji Tea Ceremony; Chapter 4: The Miyakouji Dream; Chapter 5: The Miyakoujis' Greatest Sin; Chapter 6: Connected Dreams; Chapter 7: The Past Catching Up; Epilogue
10	March 13, 2026	978-4-04-076207-4	—	—

=== Manga ===
A manga adaptation illustrated by Rito Kohsaka began serialization online via Square Enix's Gangan Online service on December 20, 2018. As of March 2026, six tankōbon volumes have been released. In July 2021, Square Enix Manga & Books licensed the manga for an English print and digital release. Square Enix published an art book on August 10, 2023.

==== Volumes ====
No.	Original release date	Original ISBN	English release date	English ISBN
1	September 12, 2019	978-4-7575-6293-6	September 13, 2022	978-1-64609-146-1
1. Betrothal; 2. The First Breakfast; 3. The First Dinner; 4. Strange Fiancée; 5. A Contradicting Heart; 6. The First Date (Part 1); 7. The First Date (Part 2); Special Short Story
2	September 9, 2020	978-4-7575-6777-1; 978-4-7575-6778-8 (SE)	January 10, 2023	978-1-64609-147-8
8. A Present for Him; 9. What I Hate Most...; 10. Unshed Tears; 11. The Truth; 12. A Meal in Thanks; 13. Envy and Impatience; 14. Differing Expectations; Special Short Story
3	October 12, 2021	978-4-7575-7499-1; 978-4-7575-7497-7 (SE)	May 9, 2023	978-1-64609-156-0
15. Uncompromising; 16. Our First Act of Defiance; 17. Betrothal; 18. My New Life with Lord Kudo; 19. Call Me Sister; 20. An Audience; Special Short Story
4	November 11, 2022	978-4-7575-7765-7; 978-4-7575-8170-8 (SE)	September 12, 2023	978-1-64609-248-2
21. A Match for the Master; 22. Arata Tsuruki; 23. True Family; 24. The Visitor; 25. Feelings Unaligned; 26. Tear-Streaked Morning; Special Short Story
5	July 11, 2024	978-4-7575-9216-2; 978-4-7575-9217-9 (SE)	April 1, 2025	978-1-64609-389-2
27. The Usuba Household; 28. Comeback; 29. A Role That Is Mine Alone; 30. True Family; 31. The Gift of Dream-Sight; 32. The Happiness I Desire; Special Short Story
6	March 12, 2026	978-4-301-00346-5; 978-4-301-00347-2 (SE)	—	—

=== Live-action film ===
A live-action film adaptation was announced on April 25, 2022. It is directed by Ayuko Tsukahara, with the screenplay written by Tomoe Kanno, and music composed by Akiyuki Tateyama. The film was released in Japan on March 17, 2023, by Toho. Idol group Snow Man performed the theme song titled "Tapestry" (タペストリー).

The film had its North American premiere at the Toronto Japanese Film Festival on June 10, 2023, under the title As Long as We Both Shall Live. It was also screened at the Fantasia International Film Festival on August 8 the same year.

=== Anime ===
An anime adaptation was announced on April 5, 2022. It was later revealed to be a television series produced by Kinema Citrus and directed by Takehiro Kubota, with supervision and storyboards handled by Takao Abo, scripts written by Ami Satō, Takahito Ōnishi and Momoka Toyoda, character designs by Shōko Yasuda, and music composed by Evan Call. The series aired in Japan from July 5 to September 20, 2023, on Tokyo MX and other networks, with Netflix simulcasting the series globally, while Bilibili simulcasted it in mainland China. The opening theme song is "Anata no Soba ni" (貴方の側に。; lit. 'By Your Side') by Riria, while the ending theme song is "Vita Philosophica" (ヰタ・フィロソフィカ) by Kashitarō Itō. The thirteenth episode was bundled as an original video animation (OVA) with the special edition of the eighth light novel volume, which was released on March 15, 2024. The OVA premiered on Netflix on November 22 of the same year.

A second season was announced after the airing of the twelfth episode. Masayuki Kojima co-directed the season with Takehiro Kubota, while Ami Satō was the sole head writer and also co-wrote the script with Minori Hashiba, Fūka Ishii, and Momoka Toyoda. The season aired from January 6 to April 9, 2025. The opening theme song is "Shiawase no Yakusoku" (幸せな約束。; lit. 'A Happy Promise') by Riria, while the ending theme song is "Tsukikage Okuri" (月影おくり; lit. 'Moonlight Sending') by Kashitarō Itō.

A new anime project was announced after the airing of the second-season finale. In November 2025, it was announced to be a three-episode special that aired in Japan on October 25, 2026, and is streaming worldwide on Netflix. The opening theme song is "Shiawase de Namida ga Deru no wa." (幸せで涙が出るのは。; lit. 'Crying Tears of Happiness.') by Riria, while the ending theme song is "Prelude no Temae ni: for me&you" (プレリュードの手前に 〜for me&you〜; lit. 'Right Before the Prelude: for me&you') by Kashitarō Itō.

=== Stage play ===
A stage play adaptation titled Watashi no Shiawase na Kekkon: Teito Rikugun Okutsuki Kitan was announced on June 9, 2023. It featured an original story, with Kaori Miura serving as the director and writer, and Taka composing the music. Akumi Agitogi, the original author, also cooperated in the production. The stage play ran at Theater 1010 in Tokyo from August 11–20, 2023.

== Reception ==
=== Accolades and box office ===
In 2020, the manga adaptation ranked eighth in the sixth Next Manga Awards in the web manga category. It ranked sixth in the 2021 edition of Takarajimasha's Kono Manga ga Sugoi! list of the best manga for female readers. The manga ranked first in the "Nationwide Bookstore Employees' Recommended Comics of 2021" list by Japanese bookstore Honya Club. In 2022, the manga was nominated for the best shōjo manga at the 46th Kodansha Manga Award. It ranked 29th on the 2022 "Book of the Year" list by Da Vinci magazine.

The live-action film debuted at first at the Japanese box office during its opening weekend, earning ¥654 million through 479,700 admissions. By December 2023, it earned ¥2.8 billion in Japan. At the 66th Blue Ribbon Awards, it was nominated for Best Film, and Ren Meguro was nominated for Best Newcomer.

=== Awards and nominations ===
Year	Award	Category	Recipient	Result	Ref.
2024	8th Crunchyroll Anime Awards	Best Romance	My Happy Marriage	Nominated	
2024	8th Crunchyroll Anime Awards	Best Drama	My Happy Marriage	Nominated	
2024	10th Anime Trending Awards	Anime of the Year	My Happy Marriage	Nominated	
2024	10th Anime Trending Awards	Boy of the Year	Kiyoka Kudou	Nominated	
2024	10th Anime Trending Awards	Girl of the Year	Miyo Saimori	Nominated	
2024	10th Anime Trending Awards	Couple Ship of the Year	Kiyoka x Miyo	Nominated	
2024	10th Anime Trending Awards	Best in Adapted Screenplay	My Happy Marriage	Nominated	
2024	10th Anime Trending Awards	Best in Sceneries and Visuals	My Happy Marriage	Nominated	
2024	10th Anime Trending Awards	Opening Theme Song of the Year	"Anata no Soba ni" by Riria	Nominated	
2024	10th Anime Trending Awards	Drama Anime of the Year	My Happy Marriage	Nominated	
2024	10th Anime Trending Awards	Romance Anime of the Year	My Happy Marriage	Won	
2024	10th Anime Trending Awards	Supernatural Anime of the Year	My Happy Marriage	Nominated	
2024	10th Anime Trending Awards	Best Voice Acting Performance – Female	Reina Ueda as Miyo Saimori	Won	
2024	Japan Expo Awards	Daruma for Best Romance Anime	My Happy Marriage	Won	
2025	Tokyo Anime Award Festival	Best Music	Evan Call	Won	
2025	9th Crunchyroll Anime Awards	Best VA Performance (Castilian)	Ainhoa Maiquez as Miyo Saimori	Nominated	

== See also ==
- Book Girl, a light novel series whose first manga adaptation was illustrated by Rito Kohsaka
