= Cindy Chupack =

American screenwriter

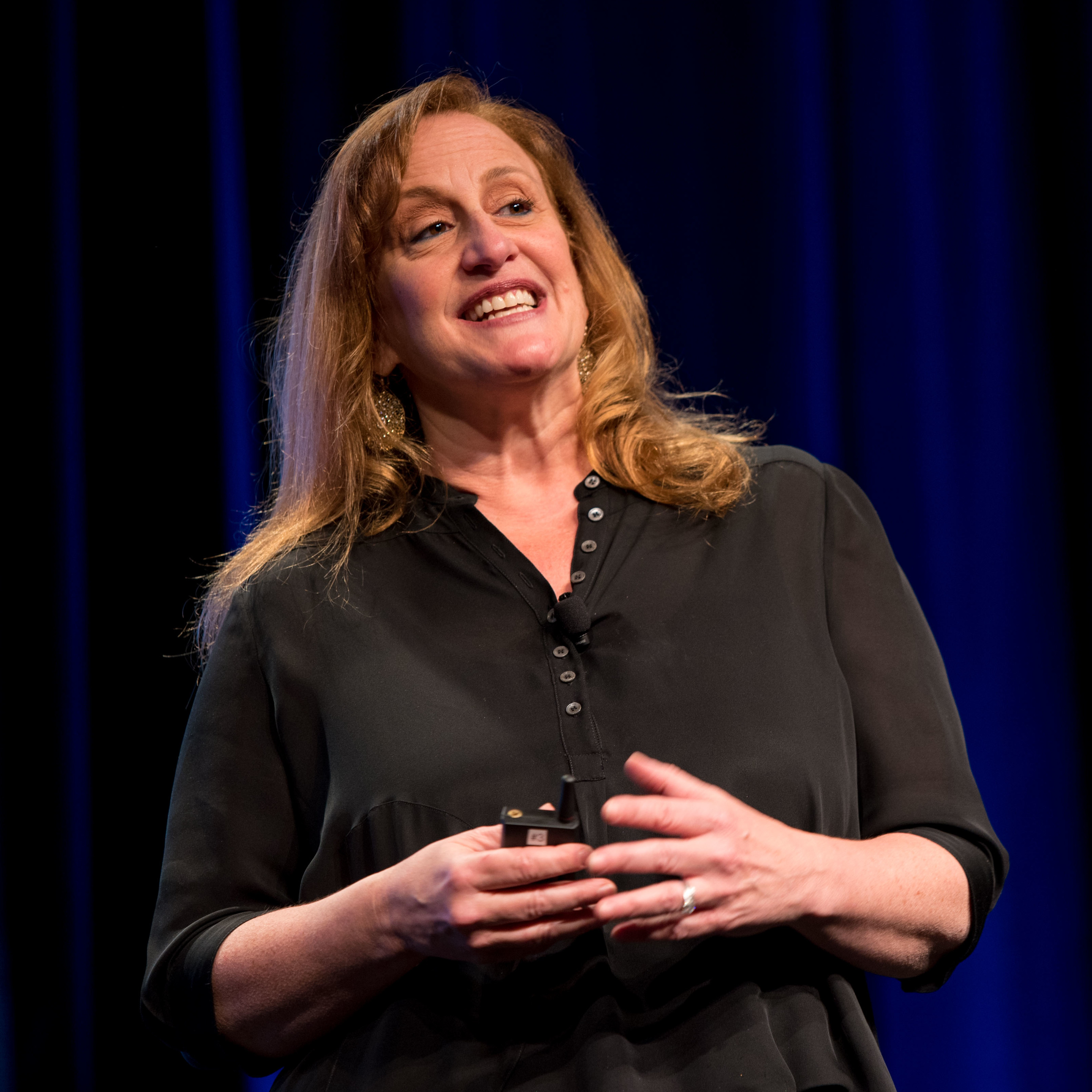
- Chupack in 2017
- Born: United States
- Occupations: Television writer, producer, screenwriter, film director
- Known for: Sex and the City, Modern Family

Cindy Chupack is an American screenwriter and film director who has won three Golden Globes and two Emmys for her work as a writer/executive producer of HBO's Sex and the City and writer/co-executive producer of ABC's Modern Family.

== Early years ==
Chupack was born and raised in Tulsa, Oklahoma, living there until she graduated from Edison Preparatory School. Although Chupack moved, and lives in California, she has said she maintains close ties to her high school friends, many of whom still live in Tulsa. She credited her third-grade teacher, Virginia Davis, at Waite Phillips Elementary School, by praising her skill at writing. Chupack said in an interview that this encouraged her to pursue becoming a professional writer.

== Career ==
Several episodes she penned—namely, Sex and the City's "Evolution", "Attack of the 5'10" Woman", "Just Say Yes", "Plus One is the Loneliest Number", "I Love a Charade", and "Splat!", and Modern Family's "Little Bo Bleep"—were individually nominated for Writer's Guild and/or Emmy awards. Chupack also worked on Everybody Loves Raymond as a writer/co-executive producer.

In May 2010, NBC announced it had commenced production of Love Bites, a television series created by Chupack for the NBC network.

Her first book, The Between Boyfriends Book, was published by St. Martin's Press. Her second book, a comic memoir about marriage entitled The Longest Date: Life as a Wife, was published by Viking in January 2014. She has also written humorous essays for The New York Times, Real Simple, Harper's Bazaar, People, Allure, Slate, and Glamour.

In April 2018, it was announced Chupack would make her directorial debut on Otherhood, with Patricia Arquette, Angela Bassett and Felicity Huffman starring.

== Personal life ==
Chupack is from Tulsa, Oklahoma. She received a journalism degree from Northwestern University in Evanston, Illinois where she was a member of Kappa Alpha Theta.

In 2014, it was reported that Chupack was living in Marina del Rey, California.

== See also ==
List of awards and nominations received by Sex and the City
