= Jimi ni Sugoi! Kōetsu Girl: Kouno Etsuko =

2016 Japanese drama TV series

- Promotional poster
- Genre: Drama
- Written by: Mayumi Nakatani; Izumi Kawasaki
- Directed by: Tōya Satō; Naoko Komuro; Masahiro Mori
- Starring: Satomi Ishihara; Masaki Suda; Tsubasa Honda
- Opening theme: "12 Gatsu no Ame" by Chay
- Country of origin: Japan
- Original language: Japanese
- No. of series: 1
- No. of episodes: 10

Production
- Producers: Rena Oda; Masahiro Mori; Kazunori Okada
- Running time: 60 minutes (Note: The first and the last episodes have an extended runtime of 70 minutes.)

Original release
- Network: NTV
- Release: 5 October – 7 December 2016

Jimi ni Sugoi! Kōetsu Girl: Kouno Etsuko (地味にスゴイ! 校閲ガール・河野悦子; English title Pretty Proofreader) is a Japanese television drama series based on the novel by Ayako Miyagi. It premiered on NTV on October 5, 2016, starring Satomi Ishihara in the lead role. Etsuko Kouno takes a job as a proofreader, all the while aspiring to become an editor at her favorite fashion magazine. Etsuko frequently commits gaffes and errors which in the end turn out to be triumphs. The program is unusual in its use of on screen text.

The drama received its highest viewership rating of 13.2%.

A spin-off drama Jimi ni Sugoi! Kōetsu Girl: Kouno Etsuko...ga Inai Suiyōbi is streamed on Hulu Japan with three episodes.

== Cast ==
Main

- Satomi Ishihara as Etsuko Kouno, a proofreader
- Masaki Suda as Yukito Orihara, a novelist
- Tsubasa Honda as Toyoko Morio, an editor of the fashion magazine Lassy
- Munetaka Aoki as Hachirō Kaizuka, an editor of the literary division
- Gorō Kishitani as Shion Takehara, a manager of the proofreading section
- Rika Adachi as Cecil Imai, a receptionist

Guest

- Takeshi Kaga as Daisaku Hongō, a mystery writer (episodes 1 and 7)
- Rie Tomosaka as Aki Komoriya, a blog writer (episode 2)
- Edoardo Sferrella as Cecil Imai's Italian fiance (episode 2)
- Nao Minamisawa as Asuka Sugimoto, an actress (episode 4)
- Hiromi Miyake as herself (episode 6)
- Yoshikazu Ebisu as himself (episode 7)

== Episodes ==
No.	Title	Directed by	Original release date	Ratings (%)
1	"なんで私が校閲に?オシャレ校閲ガールが大暴れ!"	Tōya Satō	5 October 2016	12.9
2	"毒舌&型破りな校閲ガール!張り切り過ぎて大失敗"	Tōya Satō	12 October 2016	11.2
3	"毒舌&型破りな校閲ガール!理不尽ルールに物申す"	Naoko Komuro	19 October 2016	12.8
4	"校閲VSパパラッチ女優の夢を壊す記者に本気ギレ"	Masahiro Mori	26 October 2016	11.2
5	"型破り校閲ガール!カリスマスタイリストに物申す"	Tōya Satō	2 November 2016	11.6
6	"一晩で緊急校閲!集え!作者&編集&校閲涙の本作り"	Naoko Komuro	9 November 2016	13.2
7	"幸人の衝撃の過去を校閲!事実確認すれば破局?"	Masahiro Mori	16 November 2016	12.5
8	"悦子vs部長の元カノ...仕事も恋愛も全力には全力返し"	Tōya Satō	23 November 2016	12.7
9	"校閲はいらない仕事?緊急事態!悦子が地味に"	Naoko Komuro	30 November 2016	13.2
10	"ファッション誌へ異動?校閲部ピンチ!悦子が選ぶ道"	Tōya Satō	7 December 2016	12.3
