= Reverse (2017 serial) =

2017 Japanese drama

- リバース
- Genre: Serial drama; Mystery fiction; Drama
- Written by: Satoko Okudera, Yukako Shimizu
- Directed by: Ayuko Tsukahara, Takeyoshi Yamamoto, Yoshiaki Murao
- Opening theme: "Destiny" by Che'Nelle
- Original language: Japanese
- No. of episodes: 10

Production
- Producer: Junko Arai
- Running time: 54 minutes (The first session was expanded by 15 minutes.)
- Production companies: TBS Television (Japan), Dorimax Television

Original release
- Network: TBS Television (Japan)
- Release: April 14 – June 16, 2017

Reverse is a Japanese drama that was broadcast on TBS Television (Japan) in the Friday Drama slot from April 14 to June 16, 2017. The show Stars Tatsuya Fujiwara.

The catch phrase is "Who killed my best friend?"

== Production ==
This is the third dramatization of Kanae Minato's works in the Friday drama slot.。The production team behind the last two works Midnight Ferris Wheel in 2013, and Testimony of N in 2014, are also working on this film. This television series also depicts the continuation and the ending of the original story. The continuation was written by Minato, the author of the original story. Even though the ending is original to the television series, viewers were concerned about the show spoiling the original story during the broadcast because it is a mystery work.

Under the title of the official website, it says "birth:Re:verse," a portmanteau of "reverse" and "rebirth". The story is set in 2017, when the main character, Kazuhisa Fukase, meets his girlfriend, Mihoko Ochi. The show contains flashbacks to their college days in 2007, when the disappearance of Fukase's best friend, Yuki Hirosawa, occurred. In addition to the mystery element of finding out who has been sending threatening letters to the protagonists, the work depicts an ensemble drama in which a group of seminar mates who were not so close during their college days build a friendship.

This series began shooting in Nagano Prefecture, Japan on February 7, 2017. The snowy mountain scenes in episodes 1 and 2 were done almost entirely on location.

The theme song "Destiny" was performed by Che'Nelle, who was celebrating the 10th anniversary of her debut as a singer. Che'Nelle produced the song at the offer of the drama's producer, Junko Arai. Coincidentally, it was also the 10th anniversary of Minato's debut as a writer The melody is "impactful and catchy," and the lyrics, which are "in keeping with the story," have been described as having a great impact on the work. The song was ranked No. 1 in the music distribution ranking, the ranking of lyrics search sites, and in the top ranks of Usen Hit Ranking in Japan.

== Main Cast ==
- Tatsuya Fujiwara as Kazuhisa Fukase
- Erika Toda as Mihoko Ochi
- Yuta Tamamori as Kosuke Asami
- Teppei Koike as Yuki Hirosawa
- Takahiro Miura as Takaki Murai
- Mugi Kadowaki as Asuka Murai
- Hayato Ichihara as Yasuo Tanihara
- You as Kyoko Inui
- Tetsuya Takeda as Keisuke Inui

== Staff ==
- Original story - Kanae Minato "Rebirth" (Kodansha)
- Screenplay - Satoko Okudera, Yukako Shimizu
- Music - Katsu Yokoyama
- Theme Song - "Destiny" by Che'Nelle (lyrics by Kiyoshi Matsuo, music by Daisuke Kawaguchi)
- Orchestrations - Takashi Hashimoto, Yuichi Tsuji
- Direction - Ayuko Tsukahara, Takeyoshi Yamamoto, Yoshiaki Murao
- Producer - Junko Arai
- Production - Dorimax Television, TBS Television (Japan)

== Broadcast Schedule ==
stories	broadcast date	subtitle	script	direction	TV ratings
#1	14 April	The secret behind the death of his best friend... Revenge began ten years later.	Satoko Okudera	Ayuko Tsukahara	10.3%
#2	21 April	Confession of a crime...a tragedy in the snowy mountains that happened ten years ago.	Satoko Okudera	Ayuko Tsukahara	6.3%
#3	28 April	Finally, a victim...! The looming shadow of the accuser	Satoko Okudera	Ayuko Tsukahara	10.5%
#4	5 May	Was it a woman? Who will be the next victim?	Satoko Okudera	Takeyoshi Yamamoto	8.6%
#5	12 May	The evil hands attack her... and another one disappears!	Yukako Shimizu	Yoshiaki Murao	9.0%
#6	19 May	Chapter 2 begins...new suspect! Mystery of the best friend hidden in Ehime	Satoko Okudera	Takeyoshi Yamamoto	7.4%
#7	26 May	The last 7 minutes are a shocker! The identity of the accused is revealed...!	Yukako Shimizu	Yoshiaki Murao	7.3%
#8	2 June	The worst revenge drama...what is the real purpose of the accused?	Satoko Okudera	Ayuko Tsukahara	7.5%
#9	9 June	The real murderer is finally revealed! He is the one who killed my best friend!	Yukako Shimizu	Takeyoshi Yamamoto	10.4%
#10	16 June	The real ending that no one knows... tonight all will be revealed.	Satoko Okudera	Ayuko Tsukahara	10.2%
Average rating 8.8% (Television ratings are from Video Research, Kanto region, households, real time)

== Related product ==
- Original Soundtrack (June 7, 2017, Sony Music Entertainment Japan) ASIN B06XX8WTTY JAN 4571217143003

== Awards ==
- 8th Annual Confidence Awards Drama Awards (April 2017) - Best Picture, Best Screenplay (Satoko Okudera, Yukako Shimizu)
  - The judges praised the storyline, which alternates between the present and the past, while viewers praised the casting and theme song.
- The 93rd The Television Drama Academy Awards (April - June 2017) - Best Picture, Best Actor (Tatsuya Fujiwara), Best Screenplay (Satoko Okudera, Yukako Shimizu)
- TV Station Drama Awards 2017 - Best Supporting Actor (Yuta Tamamori)
