= Dear Sister =

2014 Japanese television series

- Promotional poster
- Genre: Drama
- Written by: Mayumi Nakatani
- Directed by: Ryō Tanaka; Shin Hirano; Osamu Sekino
- Starring: Satomi Ishihara; Nao Matsushita
- Opening theme: "BF" by Moumoon
- Ending theme: "Happiness" by Che'Nelle
- Country of origin: Japan
- Original language: Japanese
- No. of episodes: 10

Production
- Producer: Toshiyuki Nakano
- Running time: 54 minutes
- Production company: Fuji Television

Original release
- Network: FNS (Fuji TV)
- Release: October 16 – December 18, 2014

Dear Sister (ディア・シスター) is a 2014 Japanese love comedy drama series starring Satomi Ishihara and Nao Matsushita. It aired on Fuji Television from October 16, 2014, to December 18, 2014, every Thursday at 22:00 (JST). The theme song is "Happiness", by Che'Nelle from her album @Che'Nelle World.

== Summary ==
One day, when Hazuki comes home to the apartment where she lives alone, at the entrance she finds shoes that don't belong to her. Though she thought her mother was there, when she came into the room, she found it in a mess. Sensing someone's presence in the back bedroom, she opened the door to find Misaki, whom she had not had contact with for six years, sharing a bed with a man Hazuki didn't know. After that, Misaki decides to freeload in Hazuki's room without permission. Hazuki, who, up until then, had been disturbed in what she wanted to do by Misaki, tries to kick her out several times, but it ends in failure. Also, Hazuki finds her fiancé and Misaki sleeping together in her bed, and the ward office where Hazuki works receives a document about Hazuki through fax. On the other hand, Misaki lives while hiding that she is pregnant, and she writes in a letter ten "Things I Want to Do Before I Die", which she makes progress on. Hazuki fights with Misaki nearly every day, but it later turns out that everything Misaki had done for Hazuki so far was with Hazuki in mind. Hazuki's own love affair, marriage, her sister's pregnancy, childbirth, illness, marriage and more are discovered and broken out one after another, and the relationship between the sisters gradually deepens.

== Cast ==
=== Main ===
- Satomi Ishihara as Misaki Fukazawa / Misaki Sakuraba
  - Honma Aizaki as young Misaki Fukazawa

27 years old. Hazuki's younger sister. She is sloppy in relationships with men, and her room is messy and untidy. Having crushed every milestone in her sister's life, she ends up at her sister's house, whom she hasn't seen in years, with a certain goal to achieve. When she was in high school, she had a platonic male friend Soichiro with whom she reunited a few years later. She had one relationship and became pregnant. After she became pregnant, she thought about the baby in her womb, and despite working at a cabaret club, she refrained from drinking. She confesses to her best friend Nagano that Soichiro is the father of her child, and she has a disease called systemic lupus erythematosus. After she loses consciousness due to symptoms of the disease, Hazuki and Nanae find out about the disease she had hidden until then. She later marries Eito. Her condition worsens during her pregnancy, and she gives birth by caesarean section. She names her child Hana.

- Nao Matsushita as Hazuki Fukazawa / Hazuki Hagiwara
  - Runa Ozawa as young Hazuki Fukazawa

29 years old. Misaki's older sister. She is a service staff at Ward Office Citizens' Life Department Citizen Service Department; she later becomes wedding dress studio Ryo's apprentice designer. She excels at advancing things systematically and has a methodical personality. Ever since she was a child, she has been embroiled in troubles caused by her sister, and her peaceful life is completely changed when her sister, who is a troublemaker, appears again. She lost her father when she was young, but it was because her father had an accident on the way to go shopping for Hazuki. However, her mother Nanae did not tell Hazuki the truth, and she has kept it hidden until now. She is shocked when he hears about Misaki's pregnancy from Soichiro but is purely happy that her sister will have a child. Learning of her sister's illness, she vows to never let Misaki die and announces to her family that she will marry Yohei.

=== Fukazawa family ===
- Nagisa Katahira as Nanae Fukazawa

55 years old. Mother of Hazuki and Misaki.

- Otomo Noa as Hana Sakuraba

Misaki's daughter with Soichiro. Her stepfather is Eito, who is also her uncle.

=== Related to the Fukazawa family ===
- Takanori Iwata as Eito Sakuraba

27 years old. Misaki's best friend. He is called Hachi by Misaki because his name is Eito which sounds like Eight in English. Misaki thought he was gay, but in fact he was just lying to build a good friendship with Misaki. He proposed to Misaki, whom he had been in love with since the day they met, and they later got married.

- Seiichi Tanabe as Soichiro Sakuraba

42 years old. Hidemitsu seminar lecturer. Hazuki's former high school homeroom teacher. Father of Misaki's child, Hana. The school and parents found out about his sleepover with Masaki, and he had to resign from the high school he worked at. After that, he worked as a cram teacher in Shizuoka, but came back to Tokyo due to personnel changes. He ignored Masaki, who contacted him many times, for her sake. He had one romantic relationship, with Misaki, whom he met for the first time in many years, but that caused Misaki to become pregnant. He still likes Misaki, and really wants to date her.

- Kanna Mori as Kazuko Sato

30 years old. Hazuki's best friend.

=== Ward office ===
- Yuta Hiraoka as Tatsuya Yoshimura

30 years old. Hazuki's ex-fiancée. Health Insurance Division employee. Due to Misaki's influence, his relationship with Hazuki breaks down.

- Megumi Yamano as Naoko Hirayasu

32 years old. A colleague of Hazuki. Every time she opens her mouth, she says to Hazuki that she is offended, and enjoys annoying her. There is some useful information in it.

=== APPLESEED ===
- Hiroyuki Hirayama as Yohei Hagiwara

36 years old. Kaori's younger brother. His regular customer Hazuki, who visits him at lunch, is a favorite of his, and he cherishes her; they eventually get married.

- Keiko Horiuchi [ja] as Kaori Uesugi

40 years old. Yohei's older sister. She is married, has three sons and works.

- Kento Muto [ja] as Souta

Employee.

- Kyoichi Mikuriya [ja] as Shunsuke

Employee.

- Sou Yamanaka [ja] as Naohisa Uesugi

Kaori's husband.

- Kishou Inoue [ja] as Kagetora Uesugi

Eldest son of the Uesugi family. The son of Naohisa and Kaori.

- Riku Oonishi [ja] as Masatora Uesugi

Second son of the Uesugi family.

- Rento Ooyama [ja] as Terutora Uesugi.

Third son of the Uesugi family.

- Ryusei Ota as Kenshin Uesugi

Fourth son of the Uesugi family. He is the same age as Hana, daughter of Misaki and Eito.

=== Other ===
- Rina Aizawa as Machiko
- Ayai Sato as Hitomi
- Risako Tanigawa [ja] as Yuko

=== Cameos ===
==== Episode 1 ====
- Miyuu Sawai as Rio

Newlywed couple.

- Hideaki Kabumoto [ja] as Kento

Newlywed couple.

==== Episode 2 ====
- Hiroyuki Watanabe as Shinji Shibukawa Also: Ep. 3–4, 9–10

Nanae's fiancé.

- Yasuyuki Maekawa as Ryutaro Shimizu Also: Ep. 3-4

Cabaret club customer, Yokohama Chuo University Hospital physician.

- Shinnosuke Yokotsuka as Hiroshi Also: Ep. 3–5, 8

Cabaret clubber wearing black clothes.

- Kinya Kikuchi [ja] as Saionji Also: Ep. 4, 9

Cabaret club customer, Saionji Construction president

==== Episode 3 ====
- Yujiro Kazama [ja] as Hikaru
- Kinari Hirano [ja] as Yuta

==== Episode 5 ====
- Satomi Nagano [ja] as Takahashi Also: Ep. 9–10

Obstetrician, gynecologist, Misaki's doctor.

==== Episode 6 ====
- Kyouko Yanagihara as Kyoko Also: Ep. 7–8

Apparel shop owner, Misaki's employer.

- Hayato Onozuka as Shiraishi

Eito's college friend

==== Episode 7 ====
- Koutaro Tanaka as Hirose Also: Ep. 9–10

Kazuko's matchmaking partner.

- Shige Uchida [ja] as Tsuchida

Kazuko's work colleague, Hirose's friend.

- Yuuta Tanokura [ja] as Yoshiki

Lawyer, Eito's college friend.

==== Episode 8 ====
- Kazuma Suzuki as Ryo Shibata Also: Ep. 9

Wedding dress designer, Hazuki's employer.

- Kei Okotsuki [ja] as Takako Aso Also: Ep. 9-10

Soichiro's ex-wife.

- Daisuke Yamazaki [ja] as Iwamoto Also: Ep. 9

Collagen disease physician, Misaki's doctor.

- Yukiko Shinohara [ja] as Reika

Wedding dress workshop craftsman.

==== Episode 9 ====
- NAOTO as Kuwana Also: Ep. 10

Eijin's senior, professional skateboarder.

==== Episode 10 ====
- Kouji Shimizu [ja] as Eiichiro Sakuraba

Soichiro and Eito's father.

- Rumi Maruyama [ja] as Satoko Sakuraba

Soichiro and Eito's stepmother.
