= Water Boys (TV series) =

- Genre: Romantic Comedy, Sports
- Starring: Takayuki Yamada; Mirai Moriyama; Eita; Yuma Ishigaki; Tomoya Ishii; Mao Miyaji; Yu Kashii
- Opening theme: Niji (虹)
- Country of origin: Japan
- Original language: Japanese
- No. of seasons: 1
- No. of episodes: 11

Production
- Producers: Kōichi Funatsu; Yukiko Yanagawa

Original release
- Network: Fuji TV
- Release: July 1 – September 9, 2003

Related
- Waterboys; Water Boys 2

Water Boys (ウォーターボーイズ, Wōtā Bōizu) is a Japanese television drama series aired in Japan on Fuji Television in 2003. There were 32 swimmers in this drama who were carefully chosen to fit their roles, but none of them had ever done synchronized swimming before.

== Story ==
Two years after the movie Water Boys takes place, the boys of Tadano High School are still in the club. The series tells the life and hardships of the boys as they learn synchronized swimming.

== Cast ==
Main cast

- Kankuro Shindo – Takayuki Yamada
- Norio Tatematsu – Mirai Moriyama
- Masatoshi Tanaka – Eita
- Go Takahara – Yuma Ishigaki
- Futoshi Ishizuka – Tomoya Ishii
- Asako Onishi – Mao Miyaji
- Kyoko Hanamura – Yu Kashii
- Mr. Ozaki – Kei Tani
- Mr. Yamaoka – Akira Fuse
- Mr. Sugita – Tetta Sugimoto
- Ms. Sakuma – Kaori Manabe
- Ms. Onogawa – Maiko Kikuchi
- Mama (of a bar) – Akira Emoto
- Chi-mama – Yuu Tokui
- Mr. Isomura – Naoto Takenaka
- Kiyomasa Isomura – Norito Yashima
- Katsumasa Sato – Hiroshi Tamaki
- Miwako Shindo – Hitomi Takahashi
- Kanichi Shindo – Kazuyuki Asano
- Hitomi Shindo – Yukiko Ikari
- Daichi Kitajima – Reo Katayama
- Atsumi Hayakawa – Saki Aibu
- Mr. Tatematsu – Sei Hiraizumi

Synchro Boy Group

- Takahiro Hōjō
- Yōsuke Fujisawa
- Yū Arakawa
- Kōki Katō
- Tenma Nosaki
- Kei Tanaka
- Hidemasa Shiozawa
- Tatsuya Isaka
- Hiroyuki Hamada
- Atsushi Abe
- Hironori Ehata
- Ichitarō
- Shintarō Chikada
- Taiyō Takeuchi
- Takanori Kawamoto
- Atsushi Sekita
- Takashi Hyuuga
- Nobuyuki Namiki
- Kougaku Washiatama
- Ichirō Shin
- Satoshi Wakisaki
- Gen Hoshino

== Episodes ==
1. Otoko no Synchro!? (男のシンクロ!?)
2. Synchro Ayaushi!? (シンクロ危うし!?)
3. Shuku Kessei! Synchro Dōkōkai (祝結成!シンクロ同好会)
4. Synchro Kōen Kekkō (シンクロ公演決行)
5. Synchro Natsu Gasshuku (シンクロ夏合宿!)
6. Namida no Inter-High (涙のインターハイ)
7. Synchro e no Omoi (シンクロへの想い)
8. Natsu Da! Umi Da! Same Otoko Da (夏だ!海だ!サメ男だ)
9. Kaisan Nanka Shinai (解散なんかしない)
10. 32-nin ga Okosu Kiseki (32人が起こす奇跡)
11. Otoko no Synchro Kōen Saikō no Namida! (男のシンクロ公演最高の涙!)
