= Ayuko Tsukahara =

Japanese filmmaker and TV series director

- 塚原 あゆ子
- Born: Saitama Prefecture, Japan
- Education: Chiba University
- Occupations: Television series director, Film director TBS Sparkle
- Years active: 1997-
- Notable work: Unnatural, La Grande Maison Tokyo, and MIU404
- Awards: Hochi Film Awards for Last Mile (2024)
- Website: TBS Sparkle

Ayuko Tsukahara (Japanese: 塚原 あゆ子, Hepburn: Tsukahara Ayuko) is a director from Saitama Prefecture, Japan. She belongs to TBS Sparkle and has directed many television series for TBS Television and films. Her notable works include the television series Unnatural, La Grande Maison Tokyo, and MIU404. She made her film directorial debut in 2018 with Cafe Funiculi Funicula.

== History ==
Tsukahara was born and raised in Kuki City, Saitama Prefecture. She was influenced by her mother, who taught the drama club at junior high school, she later worked for a media production company that produced television series. Tsukahara joined Kinoshita Productions (currently TBS Sparkle) in 1997 after graduating from Chiba University with a Bachelor of Arts. When she was a college student, she was just an ordinary college student who liked movies and theater. When she was looking for a job, she saw on a website that they were looking for a screenwriter, and thinking, "I am a major in literature, so I could probably do some writing work," she applied to her current company. After joining the company, she worked as an assistant director for a television series. Her main duties were to find locations and to create the character setting for the television series and to support the director and do other chores. After 10 years of working as an assistant director, she decided that she wanted to work primarily as a director, not as an assistant director. She directed her first television series in 2005 with Yume de Aimashou, followed by the popular Unnatural, La Grande Maison Tokyo, and MIU404. She won the Galaxy Award for Excellence in Television for Unnatural and other awards. She received Minister of Education, Culture, Sports, Science and Technology's Art Encouragement Award in 2021 for her production of MIU404. She made her film directorial debut in 2018 with Cafe Funiculi Funicula, followed by As Long As We Both Shall Live (My Happy Marriage) in 2023, Last Mile and La Grande Maison Paris in 2024, etc. She is actively working not only as a television series director but also as a film director.

== Awards ==
Years	Awards	Department	Work	Ref.
2014	83rd The Television Drama Academy Award	Best Director (with Takeyoshi Yamamoto and Akihiro Anami)	Testimony of N	
2015	The 1st Katsumi Oyama Award			
2018	96th The Television Drama Academy Award	Best Director (with Kentaro Takemura and Yoshiaki Murao)	Unnatural	
2018	Tokyo Drama Award 2018	Best Direction	Unnatural	
2020	103rd The Television Drama Academy Award	Best Director (with Daisuke Yamamuro and Takahiro Aoyama)	La Grande Maison Tokyo	
2020	Tokyo Drama Awards 2020	Best Director	La Grande Maison Tokyo	
2021	Art Encouragement Prize, New Face Award, Broadcasting Category		MIU404	
2021	110th The Television Drama Academy Award	Best Director (with Takeyoshi Yamamoto and Yoshiaki Murao)	Dearest	
2022	Tokyo Drama Award 2022	Best Director	Dearest	
2022	113th The Television Drama Academy Award	Best Director (with Tsuyoshi Yamamoto)	Ishiko and Haneo: You're Suing Me?	
2023	118th The Television Drama Academy Award	Best Director (with Daisuke Yamamuro, Daiki Hamano and Takayoshi Tanazawa)	Worst to First: A Teen Baseball Miracle	
2024	The 49th Hochi Film Awards	Best Director	Last Mile	

== Filmography ==
=== Television Series (selected) ===
Unless otherwise mentioned, this is a TBS Television series

- Last Money: Ai no Nedan (2011, Director/Producer)
- The Night Ferris Wheel (2013, Director)
- Saburo Sugimura Series (2013, Director)
- Limit (2013, Director/Producer)
- Tonight, Hold My Heart Alone (2014, Director)
- Alice's Thorn (2014, Director)
- Testimony of N (2014, Director)
- Second Love (2015, Director)
- The Mother Class - The Class of Women (2015, Director)
- 100 days -Love, Marriage, Sickness and Mom- (2015, Director)
- It's Not That I Can't Marry. I Don't Marry. (2016, Director)
- Tower of Sand (2016, Director)
- Reverse (2017, Director)
- Unnatural (2018, Director)
- TV Tokyo 55th anniversary special drama special “A Not You” (2018, Director)
- The Good Wife (2019, Director)
- La Grande Maison Tokyo (2019, Director)
  - La Grande Maison Tokyo Special (2024, Director)
- MIU404 (2020, Director)
- Captivated, by You (2021, Director)
- Why I Dress Up for Love (2021, Director)
- Dearest (2021, Director)
- Ishiko and Haneo: You're Suing Me? (2022, Director)
- Worst to First: A Teen Baseball Miracle (2023, Director)
- The Sleeping Diamond on the Sea (2024, Director)
- Lost 10 (2026, Director)

=== Films ===
- Cafe Funiculi Funicula (2018, Director)
- As Long As We Both Shall Live (2023, Director)
- Last Mile (2024, Director)
- La Grande Maison Paris (2024, Director)
- 1st Kiss (2025, Director)
