= List of romantic comedy television series =

This is a list of romantic comedy television series in chronological order and/or by country.

== 1970s–1980s ==
- The Love Boat (1977–1986) (ABC)
- Urusei Yatsura (1981–1986) (Fuji TV)
- Tokimeki Tonight (1982–1983) (Nippon Television)
- Miyuki (1983–1984) (Fuji TV)
- Who's the Boss? (1984–1992) (ABC)
- Maison Ikkoku (1986–1988) (Fuji TV)
- Kimagure Orange Road (1987–1988) (Nippon Television)
- Life Without George (1987–1989) (BBC)
- Anything But Love (1989–1992) (ABC)
- Ranma ½ (1989) (Fuji TV)

== 1990s ==
- As Time Goes By (1992–2005) (BBC)
- Mad About You (1992–1999) (NBC)
- Living Single (1993–1998) (FOX)
- The Nanny (1993–1999) (CBS)
- Friends (1994–2004) (NBC)
- DNA² (1994) (Nippon Television)
- Boston Common (1996–2002) (NBC)
- Ally McBeal (1997–2002) (FOX)
- For Your Love (1998–2002) (WB)
- The Secret Lives of Men (1998) (ABC)
- Will & Grace (1998–2006) (NBC)
- The Single Guy (1995–1997) (NBC)

== 2000s ==
- Girlfriends (2000–2008) (UPN/CW)
- Half & Half (2002–2006) (UPN)
- All of Us (2003–2007) (UPN/CW)
- Desperate Housewives (2004–2012) (ABC)
- Love Love? (2004) (Sun TV, TV Kanagawa, Anime Network)
- School Rumble (2004–2008) (TV Tokyo)
- How I Met Your Mother (2005–2014) (CBS)
- Hot Properties (2005) (ABC)
- Emily's Reasons Why Not (2006) (ABC)
- Pepper Dennis (2006) (The WB)
- Mamotte! Lollipop (2006) (KAB)
- Men in Trees (2006–2008) (ABC)
- Ugly Betty (2006–2010) (ABC)
- Not Going Out (2006–) (BBC)
- Gavin & Stacey (2007–2010) (BBC)
- Greek (2007–2011) (ABC Family)
- The Big Bang Theory (2007–2019) (CBS)
- Samantha Who? (2007–2009) (ABC)
- The Starter Wife (The Starter Wife, 2007; The Starter Wife 2008–2009) (USA Network)
- Cashmere Mafia (2008) (ABC)
- The Ex List (2008) (CBS)
- Lipstick Jungle (2008–2009) (NBC)
- Lost in Austen (2008) (ITV)
- Prince + Princess 2 (2008–2009) (CTS)
- Drop Dead Diva (2009–2014) (Lifetime)
- Accidentally on Purpose (2009–2010) (CBS)
- Big Time Rush (2009–2013) (Nickelodeon)
- Cougar Town (2009–2015) (ABC/TBS)
- Nyan Koi! (2006) (KAB) (2009) (TBS, MBS, CBC, BS-TBS)

== 2010s ==
- 100 Questions (2010) (NBC)
- Better with You (2010–2011) (ABC)
- Mike & Molly (2010–2016) (CBS)
- Perfect Couples (2010–2011) (NBC)
- Princess Jellyfish (2010) (Fuji TV)
- Romantically Challenged (2010) (ABC)
- Running Wilde (2010–2011) (FOX)
- Love Bites (2011) (NBC)
- Friends With Benefits (2011) (NBC)
- Pushing Daisies (2007–2009) (ABC)
- New Girl (2011-2018) (Fox)
- Akikan! (2009)
- Glee (2009–2015) (FOX)
- Cat Planet Cuties (2010) (MBS, AT-X, Chiba TV, TV Kanagawa, TV Aichi, TV Saitama, Ryukyu Asahi Broadcasting)
- Baka and Test (2010) (TV Tokyo)
- Aria the Scarlet Ammo (2011) (TBS, CBC, MBS, Minaminihon Broadcasting Co., BS-TBS)
- Baka to Test to Shōkanjū: Ni! (2011) (TV Tokyo)
- Maken-ki! (2011) (AT-X)
- Mayo Chiki! (2011) (TBS)
- The Reason I Can't Find My Love (2011) (Fuji TV)
- Rebound (2011) (NTV)
- Switch Girl!! (2011–2013) (Fuji TV Two)
- Aesthetica of a Rogue Hero (2012) (AT-X, Tokyo MX)
- The Ambition of Oda Nobuna (2012)
- Inu x Boku SS (2012) (MBS, TBS, CBC)
- Mysterious Girlfriend X (2012) (Tokyo MX, AT-X)
- The Mindy Project (2012–2017) (FOX)
- Nyarko-san: Another Crawling Chaos (2012) (TV Tokyo, AT-X, TV Aichi, TVO)
- OniAi (2012) (AT-X, Tokyo MX)
- Place to Place (2012) (TBS)
- Renai Neet: Wasureta Koi no Hajimekata (2012) (TBS)
- Brothers Conflict (2013)
- Date A Live (2013) (JAITS, Tokyo MX, AT-X, TwellV, Animax)
- Destiny by Love (2013)
- Golden Time (2013 – 2014) (MBS, Tokyo MX, CTC, tvk, TVS, TVA, BS11, AT-X)
- Kotoura-san (2013) (CBC)
- My Teen Romantic Comedy SNAFU (2013 – 2020) (TBS, MBS, CBC, BS-TBS)
- Oreshura (2013) (Tokyo MX, tvk, Chiba TV, TVS, TV Aichi, RKB)
- Dear Sister (2014) (Fuji Television)
- Nisekoi (2014 – 2015)
- No-Rin (2014) (Tokyo MX, TVA, SUN, GBS, BS11, Animax)
- Gekkan Shōjo Nozaki-kun (2014)
- Sakura Trick (2014) (TBS)
- Red Band Society (2014–2015) (Fox)
- Selfie (2014) (ABC)
- Jane the Virgin (2014–2019) (The CW)
- Married (2014-2015) (FX)
- You're the Worst (2014-2019) (FX)
- Catastrophe (2015-2019) (Channel 4)
- Crazy Ex-Girlfriend (2015–2019) (The CW)
- The Disappearance of Nagato Yuki-chan (2015)
- Man Seeking Woman (2015-2017) (FX)
- Love (2016–2018)
- Sukinahito ga Iru Koto (2016) (Fuji TV)
- Seiren (2017) (TBS)
- Clean with Passion for Now (2018–2019)
- Everything Sucks! (2018)
- Miss Farah (2019–2022) (MBC4)
- Kaguya-sama: Love is War (2019–2022)
- Modern Love (2019-2021)

== 2020s ==
- High School Musical: The Musical: The Series (2019–2023)
- Normal People (2020)
- Seton Academy: Join the Pack! (2020)
- Dash & Lily (2020)
- Backstreet Rookie (2020)
- Emily in Paris (2020–present)
- High Fidelity (2020)
- Love & Anarchy (2020–2022)
- Love, Victor (2020–2022)
- Love Life (2020–2022)
- Never Have I Ever (2020–2023)
- Oh, Mando! (2020)
- The Baker and the Beauty (2020)
- Zoey's Extraordinary Playlist (2020–2021)
- And Just Like That… (2021–present)
- Don't Toy with Me, Miss Nagatoro (2021–2023)
- Starstruck (2021–present)
- Girlfriend, Girlfriend (2021)
- Komi Can't Communicate (2021–present)
- The Best Man: The Final Chapters (2022)
- Heartbreak High (2022–present)
- Heartstopper (2022–present)
- How I Met Your Father (2022–2023)
- Our Flag Means Death (2022–2023)
- Uncoupled (2022)
- Colin from Accounts (2022–present)
- XO, Kitty (2023–present)
- Smothered (2023)
- Platonic (2024–present)
- Nobody Wants This (2024–present)
- The Promise of the Soul (2025)

== By country ==
=== China ===
- The Queen of SOP (2012)
- Boss & Me (2014)
- Diamond Lover (2015)
- My Amazing Boyfriend (2016)
- Stay with Me (2016)
- Meteor Garden (2018)

=== South Korea ===
- Successful Story of a Bright Girl (2002)
- Full House (2004)
- Sassy Girl Chun-hyang (2005)
- My Lovely Sam Soon (2005)
- My Girl (2005 - 2006)
- Princess Hours (2006)
- Couple or Trouble (2006)
- The 1st Shop of Coffee Prince (2007)
- Pasta (2007)
- Boys Over Flowers (2009)
- Personal Taste (2010)
- My Girlfriend Is a Nine-Tailed Fox (2010)
- Playful Kiss (2010)
- My Princess (2011)
- The Greatest Love (2011)
- A Gentleman's Dignity (2012)
- Big (2012)
- Cheongdam-dong Alice (2012 – 2013)
- Flower Boys Next Door (2013)
- My Love from the Star (2013 - 2014)
- Emergency Couple (2014)
- My Secret Hotel (2014)
- Pinocchio (2014 - 2015)
- Kill Me, Heal Me (2015)
- She Was Pretty (2015)
- Oh My Venus (2015 - 2016)
- One More Happy Ending (2016)
- Ms. Temper and Nam Jung-gi (2016)
- Another Oh Hae-young (2016)
- Entertainer (2016)
- Cinderella with Four Knights (2016)
- Love in the Moonlight (2016)
- Don't Dare to Dream (2016)
- Shopping King Louie (2016)
- Weightlifting Fairy Kim Bok-joo (2016 - 2017)
- Radiant Office (2017)
- The Liar and His Lover (2017)
- Introvert Boss (2017)
- Strong Woman Do Bong-soon (2017)
- My Secret Romance (2017)
- Suspicious Partner (2017)
- Because This Is My First Life (2017)
- Revolutionary Love (2017)
- A Korean Odyssey (2017 - 2018)
- The Undateables (2018)
- What's Wrong with Secretary Kim (2018)
- Gangnam Beauty (2018)
- Your House Helper (2018)
- My First First Love (2019)
- Backstreet Rookie (2020)
- It's Okay to Not Be Okay (2020)
- Business Proposal (2022)
- King the Land (2023)

=== Turkey ===
- Kiralık Aşk (2015–2017)
- Aşk Yeniden (2015–2017)
- Aşk Laftan Anlamaz (2016)

== See also ==
- List of romantic comedy films
