= Kawabata (surname) =

Kawabata (written: 川畑, 川端 or 河端) is a Japanese surname. Notable people with the surname include:

- Bōsha Kawabata (川端 茅舎; 1897–1941), Japanese haiku poem
- Emi Kawabata (川端 絵美; born 1970), Japanese skier
- Hikaru Kawabata (川畑 輝鎮; born 1965), Japanese professional wrestler
- Hiromi Kawabata (川畑 宏美; born 1979), Japanese basketball player
- Hitomi Kawabata (川畑瞳), Japanese softball player
- Kaito Kawabata (川端 魁人; born 1998), Japanese track Olympian
- Kazuya Kawabata (河端 和哉; born 1981), Japanese footballer
- Kawabata Makoto (河端 一), Japanese musician
- Masato Kawabata (川畑 真人; born 1977), Japanese drifting driver
- Minoru Kawabata (1911–2001), Japanese artist
- Namiko Kawabata (川畑 名美子), Japanese mixed martial artist
- Ryūshi Kawabata (川端 龍子; 1885–1966), Japanese painter
- Shiki Kawabata (川端 志 季), Japanese manga writer
- Shingo Kawabata (川畑 伸吾; born 1978), Japanese sprinter
- Shingo Kawabata (baseball) (川端 慎吾; born 1987), Japanese baseball player
- Shinichiro Kawabata (川畑 伸一郎; born 1966), Japanese baseball player
- Shintaro Kawabata (川端 伸太朗; born 1992), Japanese racing driver
- Takafumi Kawabata (川端 隆普美; born 1954), Japanese ski jumper
- Takayoshi Kawabata (川端 崇義; born 1985), Japanese baseball player
- Tatsuo Kawabata (川端 達夫; born 1945), Japanese politician
- Tomoe Kawabata (川畑 和愛; born 2002), Japanese figure skater
- Tomoyuki Kawabata (河端 朋之; born 1985), Japanese cyclist
- Yasunari Kawabata (川端 康成; 1899–1972), Japanese writer
