= Switched (2018 TV series) =

2018 Japanese-language drama science-fiction TV series

- Release poster
- Genre: Drama, Science Fiction
- Starring: Miu Tomita; Kaya Kiyohara; Daiki Shigeoka; Tomohiro Kamiyama
- Opening theme: "50/50" by Ken Arai
- Ending theme: "Akatsuki" by Johnny's WEST
- Country of origin: Japan
- Original language: Japanese
- No. of seasons: 1
- No. of episodes: 6

Production
- Running time: 33–44 min

Original release
- Network: Netflix
- Release: August 1, 2018

Switched, known in Japan as Sora o Kakeru Yodaka, (Note: 宇宙を駆けるよだか (lit. "The Night Owl Running Through the Sky")) is 2018 Japanese-language television series starring Miu Tomita, Kaya Kiyohara, Daiki Shigeoka, and Tomohiro Kamiyama. It is based on the 2014 manga series of same name by Shiki Kawabata. The series was directed by Hiroaki Matsuyama.

It was ordered direct-to-series, and the first full season premiered on Netflix streaming on August 1, 2018.

== Premise ==
High school student Ayumi Kohinata is blessed with a good life: childhood crush who confessed his love to her, a loyal friend, and a loving family. After her classmate Zenko Umine committed suicide in front of her, Ayumi finds herself and Zenko switched body. Ayumi has to live inside Zenko's body as she experiences the life that Zenko has been going through. The story follows the twists and turns of the character Umine and the reasons why she committed suicide, while social anxiety and depression are underlying themes throughout the series.

== Cast ==
- Kaya Kiyohara as Ayumi Kohinata / Zenko Umine
- Miu Tomita as Zenko Umine / Ayumi Kohinata
- Daiki Shigeoka as Shunpei Kaga
- Tomohiro Kamiyama as Koshiro Mizumoto
- Megumi Seki as Ukon
- Reika Kirishima as Ayumi's mother
- Shinji Rokkaku as Ayumi's father
- Miu Suzuki as Ritsu Inaki (Ayumi's friend)
- Riko Hisada as Maria Tsuchiya (Ayumi's friend)
- Shoko Nakajima as Zenko's mother
- Miyazaki Ayumu as young Zenko
- Nishizawa Aina as young Ayumi

== Episodes ==
No.	Title	Original release date
1	"Suicide"	August 1, 2018
2	"Betrayal"	August 1, 2018
3	"Confession"	August 1, 2018
4	"Trap"	August 1, 2018
5	"Lies"	August 1, 2018
6	"Decisions"	August 1, 2018

== Release ==
The full first season of Switched consisting of 6 episodes premiered on Netflix streaming on August 1, 2018.
