= Setsuyaku Rock =

Japanese manga series

- First tankōbon volume cover

節約ロック (Setsuyaku Rokku)
- Genre: Comedy
- Manga
- Written by: Hiromi Okubo
- Published by: Kodansha
- Imprint: Morning KC
- Magazine: Morning
- Original run: December 22, 2016 – July 6, 2017
- Volumes: 3
- Television drama
- Directed by: Kaku Mizuno; Atsushi Okamoto; Kai Ōe
- Produced by: Yoko Edami; Tarō Nagamatsuya; Yō Tomomorishita
- Written by: Hayashi Mori
- Music by: Hidehiro Kawai
- Original network: Nippon TV
- Original run: January 22, 2019 – March 26, 2019
- Episodes: 10
- icon

Setsuyaku Rock (Japanese: 節約ロック, Hepburn: Setsuyaku Rokku; lit. 'Rock Savings') is a Japanese manga series by Hiromi Okubo. It was serialized in Kodansha's seinen manga magazine Morning from December 2016 to July 2017. A live-action television drama adaptation was broadcast on Nippon TV from January to March 2019, as the seventh entry to their late-night Monday television programming block, Shin Dora.

== Plot ==
Takao Matsumoto, a 30-year-old salaryman who has a passion for Western rock music, has no money in his savings, causing his girlfriend, Makiko, to break up with him. After discovering how delicious homemade food is, Takao decides to start being frugal in order to get back together with Makiko. Each chapter depicts Takao saving money in various situations, such as food, electricity, clothes, and medical expenses. Every time Takao saves money, it is accompanied with a visual gag of him hearing money rain down into an imaginary piggy bank.

== Characters ==
Takao Matsumoto (松本 タカオ, Matsumoto Takao)
Portrayed by: Tatsuya Ueda
Takao is a 30-year-old salaryman who works at an advertising agency, earning a net income of ¥200,000. He plays in a band and has no sense of money.
Makiko Oguro (大黒 マキコ, Ōguro Makiko)
Portrayed by: Mina Fujii
Makiko is Takao's ex-girlfriend who breaks up with him over his lack of sense of money.
Kouta Inaba (稲葉 コウタ, Inaba Kōta)
Portrayed by: Daiki Shigeoka
Inaba is a refreshing and handsome man who Takao sees as his rival, especially when Makiko befriends him.
Hamada (浜田)
Hamada is a follower of Takao's Instagram account and they develop a close relationship when they meet in person.

== Media ==
=== Manga ===
Setsuyaku Rock is written and illustrated by Hiromi Okubo. It was serialized in Kodansha's seinen manga magazine Morning from December 22, 2016, (2017 issue nos. 4 and 5) to July 6, 2017 (2017 issue no. 32). The chapters were later released in three tankōbon volumes under the Morning KC imprint.

No.	Japanese release date	Japanese ISBN
1	January 23, 2018	978-4-06-510836-9
2	March 13, 2019	978-4-06-515418-2
3	May 23, 2019	978-4-06-515599-8

=== Television drama ===
A live-action television series adaptation was announced on November 18, 2018, as the seventh entry to Nippon TV's late-night Monday television block, Shin Dora. The series aired on Nippon TV from January 22, 2019, (Note: Nippon TV lists the broadcast date as January 21, 2019, at 00:59, which is January 22, 2019, at 12:59 a.m.) to March 26, 2019, for 10 episodes.

The series was re-imagined as a buddy comedy and stars KAT-TUN member Tatsuya Ueda as Takao and Johnny's West member Daiki Shigeoka as Inaba. On December 24, 2018, Mina Fujii was cast as Makiko. Other series regulars include Ayaka Wilson and Takashi Ukaji as Rin Shiina and Keizō Kuwata respectively, original characters created for the drama. Cookie from the comedy duo Yasei Bakudan also plays an original character created for the drama as the "god of rock", with ten different appearances based on popular Western musicians.

The drama adaptation is directed by Kaku Mizuno, Atsushi Okamoto, and Kai Ōe, with Hayashi Mori writing the script and Hidehiro Kawai composing the music. The theme song is "Go Ahead" by KAT-TUN. In addition, Ueda performed the insert song "Setsuyaku Rock." A version of the song was also performed as a duet between Ueda and Shigeoka, credited as the "Setsuyaku Rockers."

Nippon TV rebroadcast the drama beginning on July 20, 2020, with the addition of newly filmed scenes. The new scenes took place a year after the initial broadcast of the final episode and take place in July 2020, depicting Takao and Inaba reflecting on the events of the past year as they are being kidnapped.

No.	Title	Original release date
1	"Rock, Savings, and Empty Space"; Transliteration: "Rokku to Setsuyaku to Hazama de" (Japanese: ロックと節約と狭間で)	January 22, 2019
2	"Rock, Savings, and Fashion"; Transliteration: "Rokku to Setsuyaku to Oshare" (Japanese: ロックと節約とオシャレ)	January 29, 2019
3	"Rock, Savings, and Drinking Party"; Transliteration: "Rokku to Setsuyaku to Nomikai" (Japanese: ロックと節約と飲み会)	February 5, 2019
4	"Rock, Savings, and Utility Costs"; Transliteration: "Rokku to Setsuyaku to Suidō Kōnetsu Hi" (Japanese: ロックと節約と水道光熱費)	February 12, 2019
5	"Rock, Savings, and Office"; Transliteration: "Rokku to Setsuyaku to Ofisu" (Japanese: ロックと節約とオフィス)	February 19, 2019
6	"Rock, Savings, and High-Class Cooking"; Transliteration: "Rokku to Setsuyaku to Kōkyū Ryōri" (Japanese: ロックと節約と高級料理)	February 26, 2019
7	"Rock, Savings, and Extremely Cheap Cooking"; Transliteration: "Rokku to Setsuyaku to Gekiyasu Ryōri" (Japanese: ロックと節約と激安料理)	March 5, 2019
8	"Rock, Savings, and Male Improvement"; Transliteration: "Rokku to Setsuyaku to Otoko Migaki" (Japanese: ロックと節約と男磨き)	March 12, 2019
9	"The Ultimate Savings"; Transliteration: "Kyūkyoku no Setsuyaku" (Japanese: 究極の節約)	March 19, 2019
10	"Rock and Savings are Called Love"; Transliteration: "Rokku to Setsuyaku de Ai o Yobu" (Japanese: ロックと節約で愛を叫ぶ)	March 26, 2019

== See also ==
- It's All About the Looks, another manga series by the same author
