= Shiki =

Shiki may refer to:

== Places ==
- Shiki District, Afghanistan
- Shiki District, Nara, Japan
- Shiki, Saitama, Japan
- Shiki Theatre Company, a Japanese theatre company

== Languages ==
- Shiki language

== People ==
- Masaoka Shiki (正岡 子規; 1867–1902), Japanese haiku and tanka poet
- Satoshi Shiki (士貴 智志; born 1970), Japanese manga artist
- Shiki Aoki (青木 志貴; born 1990), Japanese actor, voice actor, model and fashion designer
- Shiki Kawabata (川端 志季), Japanese writer
- Shiki Kuroeda (黒枝 士揮; born 1992), Japanese racing cyclist

== Fiction ==
- Shiki (novel), a horror novel by Fuyumi Ono, adapted into a manga and anime series
- Shiki (Black Cat), a character from Black Cat
- Shiki (Samurai Shodown), a character from Samurai Shodown
- Shiki Misaki, a character from The World Ends with You
- Shiki Nanaya, a character from Tsukihime#Shiki Nanaya
- Shiki Ryōgi, a character from Kara no Kyoukai
- Senri Shiki, a character from Vampire Knight
- Shiki Tohno, a character from Tsukihime
- Shiki, a character from Togainu no Chi
- Shiki (One Piece), a character from One Piece manga, and the main antagonist of the anime movie One Piece Film: Strong World
- Shiki Ando, a character from Paradox Live
- Shiki Granbell, the main male protagonist from the manga and anime series Edens Zero
- Shiki Ichinose, a character from The Idolmaster Cinderella Girls
- Shiki Iseya, a character from The Idolmaster SideM
- Shiki Wakana, a character from Love Live! Superstar!!
- Eiki Shiki Yamaxandu, a character in Phantasmagoria of Flower View from the Touhou Project series
