= Daiki Shigeoka =

Japanese singer and actor (born 1992)

Daiki Shigeoka 重岡 大毅
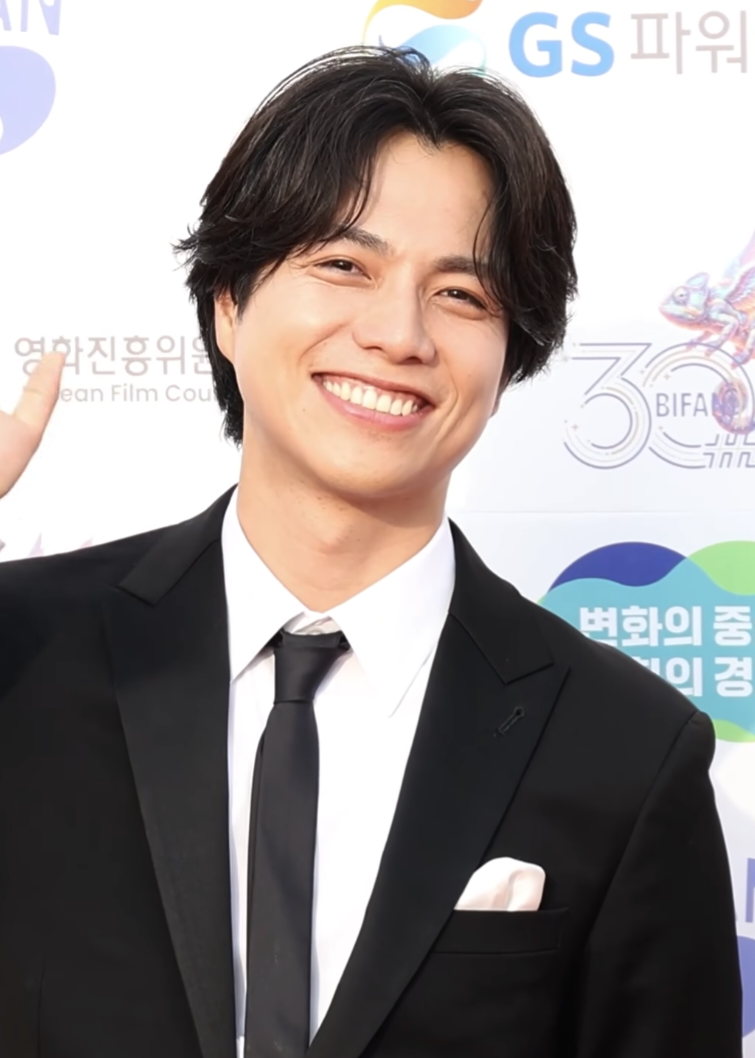
- Shigeoka in 2026

Background information
- Born: August 26, 1992 (age 33)
- Origin: Hyogo, Japan
- Genres: J-pop
- Occupations: Singer; actor
- Instrument: Vocals
- Years active: 2006–present
- Label: ELOV-Label
- Member of: West
- Spouse: Unknown (m. 2026)

Daiki Shigeoka (重岡 大毅, Shigeoka Daiki; born 26 August 1992) is a Japanese singer and actor. He is a member of the Japanese idol group West. (formerly known as Johnny's West), which is under the management of Starto Entertainment.

== Career ==
Shigeoka joined Johnny & Associates, a talent agency that trains boys to become singers, in 2006. As a trainee, he was a member of the trainee group Hey! Say! 7 West (later called 7 West), which was the Kansai counterpart of Hey! Say! 7.

Shigeoka made his acting debut in 2008 in an episode of Dramatic-J, a Kansai Jr. television series. After several supporting roles, he landed his first lead role in the television series Shark: 2nd Season (2014). In April 2014, he debuted as a member Johnny's West.

== Personal life ==
On August 9, 2026, Shigeoka announced through his agency that he had registered his marriage to his longtime partner and confirmed the news of the birth of their first child.

== Filmography ==
=== Film ===
Year	Title	Role	Notes	Ref.
2012	Ryō Fest!: Saigo no Nanafushigi	Shinnosuke Date	Lead role	
2013	Kansai Johnnys Jr. no Kyōto Uzumasa Kōshinkyoku!	Masato Mimura	Lead role	
2013	Gekijō-ban Bad Boys J	Keita Onozawa		
2014	Shinobu Johnny Sanjo! Mirai e no Tatakai	West Ninja / Kazaha	Lead role	
2016	The Magnificent Nine	Otoemon Kokudaya		
2016	Drowning Love	Katsutoshi Ōtomo		
2023	The Forbidden Play	Naoto Ihara	Lead role	
2024	In an Isolated Cottage on a Snowy Mountain	Kazuyuki Kuga	Lead role	
2025	The 35-Year Promise	Tamotsu Nishihata (young)		
2025	Mission: Sorta Possible	Yoichiro	Lead role	
2026	How to Generate a Perfect Crime	Wataru Hatsuumi	Lead role	
2026	Love≠Comedy	Radio script writer	Cameo	

=== Television ===
Series

Year	Title	Role	Notes	Ref.
2008	Dramatic-J	Tsuyoshi Murakami	Episode: "Bokura wa Hanabi o Ageru..."	
2009	Samurai Tenkōsei	Tsuyoshi Shimura	Television film	
2009	Dramada-J	Ryōta Sawamura	Episode: "Itsuka no Yūjō-bu, Natsu"	
2010	Daremo Shiranai J Gakuen	Jōji Yamakawa	Episode: "Renjishi no Mai"	
2012	Tsubasa yo! Are ga Koi no Hi da	Junpei Katō	Television film	
2014	Shark: 2nd Season	Saku Irie	11 episodes	
2014	Saving My Stupid Youth	Yuzuru Ebisawa	10 episodes	
2017	Blazing Transfer Students	Kakeru Shigeoka	8 episodes	
2018	Switched	Shunpei Kaga	Lead role; 6 episodes	
2019	Setsuyaku Rock	Kota Inaba	10 episodes	
2019	Strawberry Night Saga	Shinji Otsuka	Episode 1 and 8	
2019	You Can't Expense This!	Taiyo Yamada	10 episodes	
2019	Death Office	Takeseki	Episode 6 (guest role)	
2020	Shiranakute Ii Koto	Haruki Nonaka	10 episodes	

Variety and other programs

Year	Title	Notes	Ref(s)
2026	Nakajima Shigeoka Iwamoto no nakayoshi trio tabi taishi ni naritai!	National travel and promotion with the aim to become a tourism ambassador. Hosted with Kento Nakajima and Hikaru Iwamoto (Snow Man)	

== Stage ==
- Tough Weeds: Hikari no Sasu Hō e (Tough Weeds 光の射す方へ) (2009)
- Shonentachi: Kōshi naki Rōgoku (少年たち 〜格子なき牢獄〜) (2010, 2011, 2012)
- Takizawa Kabuki 2012 (滝沢歌舞伎2012) (2012)
- Shonentachi: Jail in the Sky (少年たち 〜Jail in the Sky〜) (2012)
- Another (2013)
