= Tomohiro Kamiyama =

Japanese actor, tarento and idol (born 1993)

- 神山 智洋
- Born: 1 July 1993 (age 33); Hyōgo Prefecture, Japan
- Occupations: Idol; tarento; actor
- Years active: 2004–present
- Agent: Starto Entertainment

Tomohiro Kamiyama (神山 智洋, Kamiyama Tomohiro; born 1 July 1993, in Hyōgo Prefecture) is a Japanese actor, tarento and idol. He is a member of West, which is under the management of Starto Entertainment formerly known as Johnny & Associates.

== Biography ==
In February 2004, Kamiyama joined Johnny & Associates as a Kansai Lesson-sei and worked Johnny's Jr. units Kansai Boy's and Top Kids. On February 5, 2014, Kamiyama was announced as a member of the nascent boy band West. This day is said to be the formation day of West.

He participated in his first marathon at the 5th Osaka Marathon on 25 October 2015. Although his knees were hurt, Kamiyama finished six hours, 37 minutes and fifteen seconds, but he could not achieve the goal of cutting four hours.

== Filmography ==
=== TV dramas ===
| Year | Title | Role | Notes | Ref. |
|---|---|---|---|---|
| 2016 | Nobunaga Moyu | Mori Bōmaru | Television film | |
| 2017 | Dai Binbō | Yuto Kogure | | |
| 2018 | Switched | Kōshirō Mizumoto | Lead role | |
| 2024 | Hakubo no Chronicle | Kai Yukimura | Lead role | |

=== Films ===
| Year | Title | Role | Notes | Ref. |
|---|---|---|---|---|
| 2025 | Mission: Sorta Possible | Utage | Lead role | |

=== Stage ===
| Year | Title | Role | Notes | Ref. |
|---|---|---|---|---|
| 2012 | Takizawa Kabuki 2012 | | | |
| 2015 | Blood Brothers | Eddie | Co-starring with Akito Kiriyama | |
| 2016 | Vamp Bamboo Burn | | | |
| 2024 | The Producers | Leo Bloom | | |
