= Airi Matsui =

Japanese actress and model (1996)

- 松井 愛莉
- Born: December 26, 1996 (age 29); Iwaki, Fukushima, Japan
- Occupations: Moddel; actress
- Years active: 2009–present
- Height: 1.70 m (5 ft 7 in)
- Spouse: Kohei (m. 2025)
- Musical career
- Genre: J-pop
- Label: Amuse Inc.

Airi Matsui (松井 愛莉, Matsui Airi; born December 26, 1996) is a Japanese actress, model, and former singer. She is signed to the agency Amuse Inc. and is a former member of Japanese idol group Sakura Gakuin.

== Career ==
Matsui endorsed the Ghana chocolate brand in 2015. She also released her first photobook on March 27, which contains swimsuit and lingerie shots from Guam and Fukushima.

== Personal life ==
Matsui's younger brother, Renji, is a professional footballer who plays for J1 League club, Kawasaki Frontale, as of 2024.

On September 6, 2025, she announced her marriage to a model Kohei.

== Filmography ==
=== Film ===
Year	Title	Role	Notes	Ref.
2014	Lingering Spirits	Kei Inuzuka		
2015	Flying Colors	Mika Honda		
2016	Yell for the Blue Sky	Himari Wakita		
2019	Fortuna's Eye	Mariko Uematsu		
2019	Dosukoi! Sukehira	Ai Fujishiro		
2020	Iyashi no Kokoromi	Rina Ichinose	Lead role	
2021	My Blood & Bones in a Flowing Galaxy	Ozaki (older)		
2021	First Gentleman	Rui Itō		
2023	In Love and Deep Water	Rina Kaneyoshi		
2023	How to Find a Lover	Yui		

=== Television ===
Year	Title	Role	Notes	Ref.
2013	Yamada-kun and the Seven Witches	Noa Takigawa		
2014	GTO	Kaeko Furuya		
2014	Hell Teacher Nūbē	Kyōko Inaba		
2015	Age Harassment	Rena Shiono		
2015	Anohana: The Flower We Saw That Day	Naruko "Anaru" Anjō	Television film	
2016	Kūfuku Anthology	Misaki	Lead role	
2016	It's Not That I Can't Marry, I Don't Marry	Eri Saeki		
2017	Love Concierge Season 2	Mai Nakase		
2017	Three Dads	Hana Watanabe		
2017	Otona Koukou	Sakura Himetani		
2018	Good Doctor	Shiori Morishita		
2019	Secret Unrequited Love	Yumi Igarashi		
2019	You Can't Expense This!	Kirika Nakajima		
2020	This Guy is the Biggest Mistake in My Life	Yui Sato		
2020	In House Marriage Honey	Ami Haruta	Lead role	
2023	Trillion Game	Aimi	Episode 3	
2024	Hakubo no Chronicle	Akari Fusegi		
