= Hakubo no Chronicle =

Japanese manga series by Masami Yuki

- First tankōbon volume cover

白暮のクロニクル (Hakubo no Kuronikuru)
- Genre: Mystery; Supernatural
- Manga
- Written by: Masami Yuki
- Published by: Shogakukan
- Magazine: Weekly Big Comic Spirits
- Original run: August 26, 2013 – May 29, 2017
- Volumes: 11
- Television drama
- Directed by: Kazuhiro Nakagawa; Gō Sasaki
- Written by: Shōta Koyama; Taiki Yamazaki; Shiori Tanaka
- Music by: Harumi Fuuki
- Original network: Wowow
- Original run: March 1, 2024 – May 17, 2024
- Episodes: 12
- icon

Hakubo no Chronicle (白暮のクロニクル) is a Japanese manga series written and illustrated by Masami Yuki. It was serialized in Shogakukan's seinen manga magazine Weekly Big Comic Spirits from August 2013 to May 2017, with its chapters collected in 11 tankōbon volumes.

== Media ==
=== Manga ===
Written and illustrated by Masami Yuki, Hakubo no Chronicle was serialized in Shogakukan's seinen manga magazine Weekly Big Comic Spirits from August 26, 2013, to May 29, 2017. Shogakukan collected its chapters in 11 tankōbon volumes, released from March 30, 2014, to June 30, 2017.

==== Volumes ====
No.	Japanese release date	Japanese ISBN
1	March 30, 2014	978-4-09-185847-4
2	April 30, 2014	978-4-09-186164-1
3	July 30, 2014	978-4-09-186289-1
4	January 9, 2015	978-4-09-186660-8
5	April 30, 2015	978-4-09-186879-4
6	August 28, 2015	978-4-09-187174-9
7	December 28, 2015	978-4-09-187365-1
8	April 28, 2016	978-4-09-187596-9
9	August 30, 2016	978-4-09-187736-9
10	January 30, 2017	978-4-09-189261-4
11	June 30, 2017	978-4-09-189535-6

=== Drama ===
In October 2023, it was announced that the series would receive a television drama adaptation, starring Tomohiro Kamiyama and Airi Matsui. It aired for 12 episodes on Wowow from March 1 to May 17, 2024.

== Reception ==
Hakubo no Chronicle placed 14th on Takarajimasha's Kono Manga ga Sugoi! 2015 ranking of top 20 manga for male readers, and placed 20th on the 2016 ranking. It was nominated for the 49th Seiun Award for the Best Comic category in 2018.
