= Megumi Seki =

Japanese actress

Megumi Seki (関 めぐみ, Seki Megumi) (born 8 September 1985 in Kanagawa Prefecture, Japan) is a Japanese actress. Notable movies that star her include Koi wa Go-Shichi-Go! (2005), Negative Happy Chainsaw Edge (2008) and Dragonball Evolution (2009).

== Filmography ==
=== TV dramas ===
- Ganbatte Ikimasshoi (2005)
- Seishun Energy Mo Hitotsu no Sugar & Spice (2006)
- Flight Panic (2007)
- Life (2007)
- Aiba Monogatari (2008)
- Sunao ni Narenakute (2010)
- Death Note (2015), Shoko Himura
- Switched (2018)

=== Movies ===
- Funny Bunny (2021)
- My Brother, the Alien (2023), Akari Nakano
