= It's All About the Looks =

Japanese manga series

- Cover of the Japanese version of vol. 1, first released on July 11, 2014

人は見た目が100パーセント (Hito wa Mitame ga Hyaku Pāsento)
- Genre: Comedy
- Manga
- Written by: Hiromi Okubo
- Published by: Kodansha
- Imprint: Be Love KCDX
- Magazine: Be Love
- Original run: December 14, 2013 – June 1, 2017
- Volumes: 5
- Television drama
- Directed by: Hiroaki Matsuyama; Junsuke Shinada; Kōzō Nagayama
- Produced by: Toshiyuki Nakano; Daisuke Kusagaya
- Written by: Tomoko Aizawa
- Music by: Taku Takahashi
- Studio: Fuji TV Division 1 Center
- Original network: Fuji TV
- Original run: April 13, 2017 – June 15, 2017
- Episodes: 10

It's All About the Looks (Japanese: 人は見た目が100パーセント, Hepburn: Hito wa Mitame ga Hyaku Pāsento; lit. "Appearance Matters 100% to a Person"), also titled Woman's All About the Looks, is a Japanese manga series by Hiromi Okubo. It's All About the Looks was serialized in the josei manga magazine Be Love from December 14, 2013, to June 1, 2017. A live-action television drama adaptation was broadcast from April 13 to June 15, 2017.

== Plot ==
Jun Jonouchi, Seira Sato, and Mitsuko Maeda are three scientists who work as researchers at a paper company. Having been out of touch with fashion, the three women form the research group JSM (an acronym of their names) to study and try out modern fashion trends with varying degrees of success. Each chapter is centered on a modern fashion or beauty trend that the three women attempt.

== Characters ==
Jun Jonouchi (城之内 純, Jōnouchi Jun)
Portrayed by: Mirei Kiritani
Jonouchi a 30-year-old woman. She is described as a plain-looking woman who has never dated in her life.
Mitsuko Maeda (前田 満子, Maeda Mitsuko)
Portrayed by: Asami Mizukawa
Maeda is a 40-year-old woman with an outdated fashion sense.
Seira Sato (佐藤 聖良, Satō Seira)
Portrayed by: Chiemi Blouson
Sato is a 25-year-old woman who researches fashion to understand why she is unpopular, in spite of people of her body type being able to be fashionable. However, she would rather spend money on delicious food instead of clothes.

== Media ==
=== Manga ===
It's All About the Looks is written and illustrated by Hiromi Okubo. It is serialized in the josei manga magazine Be Love from December 14, 2013 (2014 issue no. 1) to June 1, 2017 (2017 issue no. 12). The chapters were later released in five bound volumes by Kodansha under the Be Love KCDX imprint.

In addition to the manga's serialization in Be Love, Okubo also drew a short comic where the characters research skincare that was published in the September 2015 issue of the fashion magazine Voce.

No.	Japanese release date	Japanese ISBN
1	July 11, 2014	978-4063770285
1. "The Magic of Applying for Unfeminine Women" (女子モドキのつけまじっく, Joshi Modoki no Tsukemajikku); 2. "Patterned Pants VS Old Woman Mentality" (柄パンVS.ばばメンタル, Gara Pan Bāsu Baba Mentaru); 3. "20th Century Middle-aged Woman" (20世紀おばはん, Nijū Seiki Obahan); 4. "My Boyfriend Likes Smart People" (私の彼は頭好き, Watashi no Kare wa Atama Suki); 5. "Slave of Duck Lips" (アヒル口のドレイ, Ahiru-guchi no Dorei); 6. "Looking Only Through Contact Lenses" (レンズだけ見つめてる, Renzu Dake Mitsumeteru); 7. "First Time at a Salon" (はじめてのサロン, Hajimete no Saron); 8. "The Secret Garden?" (ヒミツの花園？, Himitsu no Hanazono?); 9. "Sweat Equation" (スウェット方程式, Suuetto Hōteishiki)
2	January 13, 2015	978-4063771121
10. "The Supreme Hair Part Line's Hair Arrangement!" (天下分け目のヘアアレンジ！, Tenka Wakeme no Hea Arenji!); 11. "I Won't Let it Happen!" (私、さしましぇん！, Watashi, Sashimashen!); 12. "I Don't Need a Blotch, Summer" (シミなんていらねぇよ、夏, Shimi Nante Iranē yo, Natsu); 13. "In the Name of Rabbits, I Will Punish You!" (うさぎに代わって、お仕置きよ！, Usagi ni Kawatte, Oshioki yo!); 14. "Before Falling in Love Seriously with Hair Removal" (マジで恋する脱毛まえ, Maji de Koisuru Datsumou Mae); 15. "If I Turn Around, An Ugly Woman is There" (振り返ればブスがいる, Furikaereba Busu ga Iru); 16. "The Story of a 30-Year-Old in Summer" (三十路インイン物語, Sanjū-rō In In Monogatari); 17. "The Type of Person Searching for Marriage in a Heart-pounding Cardigan" (ときめきカーデ婚活系, Tokimeki Kāde Konkatsu-kei); 18. "The Angel Who is Getting Gray Hair" (白髪の生えたエンジェル, Hakuhatsu no Haeta Enjeru)
3	September 11, 2015	978-4063773057
19. "Big Crimes of Dresses" (ドレス大捜査線, Doresu Daisōsasen); 20. "Room Wear" (HE・YA・GI); 21. "Age 40, Show Your Shoulders" (Age40、肩出して, Age 40, Kata Dashite); 22. "Tell Me I Smell Nice" (いい匂いだと言ってくれ, Ii Nioi da to Ittekure); 23. "Quality of Bags" (バッグの品格, Baggu no Hinkaku); 24. "Jeans Failure" (ジーンズ・失格, Jīnzu Shikkaku); 25. "Wearing a Necklace is Natural" (ネックレスは突然に, Nekkuresu wa Totsuzen ni); 26. "Between the Ears and Face" (耳とモテのあいだに, Mimi to Mote no Aida ni); 27. "A Dreamy Imitation is Not Needed" (夢見るモドキじゃいられない, Yumemiru Modoki ja Irarenai)
4	February 12, 2016	978-4063774245
28. "I Can't Stop My Skin From Becoming Saggy" (皮膚のたるみが止まらない, Hifu no Tarumi ga Tomaranai); 29. "The Space Between an Unfeminine Woman and a Wonderful Lady" (女子モドキとステキ女子の間, Joshi Modoki to Suteki Joshi no Aida); 30. "The Shop, Shop Employee, and Me" (店と店員と私, Mise to Ten'in to Watashi); 31. "The Wonderful Lady on the Other Side" (ステキ女子の向こう側, Suteki Joshi no Mukōgawa); 32. "Being Fat, High Heels, Man, and Woman" (デブとヒールと男と女, Debu to Hīru to Otoko to Onna); 33. "Washing My Hair Tonight" (髪洗ってTONIGHT, Kami Aratte Tonight); 34. "Road of the Oil" (ロード・オブ・ザ・オイル, Rōdo Obu Za Oiru); 35. "Glasses Aren't Decoration" (飾りじゃないのよメガネは, Kazari Janai no yo Megane wa)
5	June 13, 2017	978-4063932157
36. "So Many Scarves" (ストールがいっぱい, Sutōru ga Ippai); 37. "Request of Undereye Fat" (涙袋のリクエスト, Namida Bukuro no Rikuesuto); 38. "Beyond a Small Face" (小顔ノムコウ, Kogao no Mukō); 39. "Your Yukata is 10,000 Volts (First Part)" (君の浴衣は10000ボルト（前編）, Kimi no Yukata wa Ichi-man Boruto (Zenpen)); 40. "Your Yukata is 10,000 Volts (Final Part)" (君の浴衣は10000ボルト（後編）, Kimi no Yukata wa Ichi-man Boruto (Kōhen)); 41. "Over the Personal Color" (オーバー・ザ・パーソナルカラー, Ōbā Za Pāsonaru Karā); "Filming Report Comic of the Drama It's All About the Looks" (ドラマ「人は見た目が100パーセント」撮影ルポ漫画, Dorama "Hito wa Mitame ga Hyaku Pāsento" Tossai Rupo Manga); "Interview with Mirei Kiritani, Asami Mizukawa, and Chiemi Blouson from the Drama It's All About the Looks" (ドラマ「人は見た目が100パーセント」スペシャル桐谷美玲さん・水川あさみさん・ブルゾンちえみさんインタビュー, orama "Hito wa Mitame ga Hyaku Pāsento" Supesharu Kiritani Mirei-san, Mizukawa Asami-san, Buruzon Chiemi-san Intabyū)

=== Television drama ===
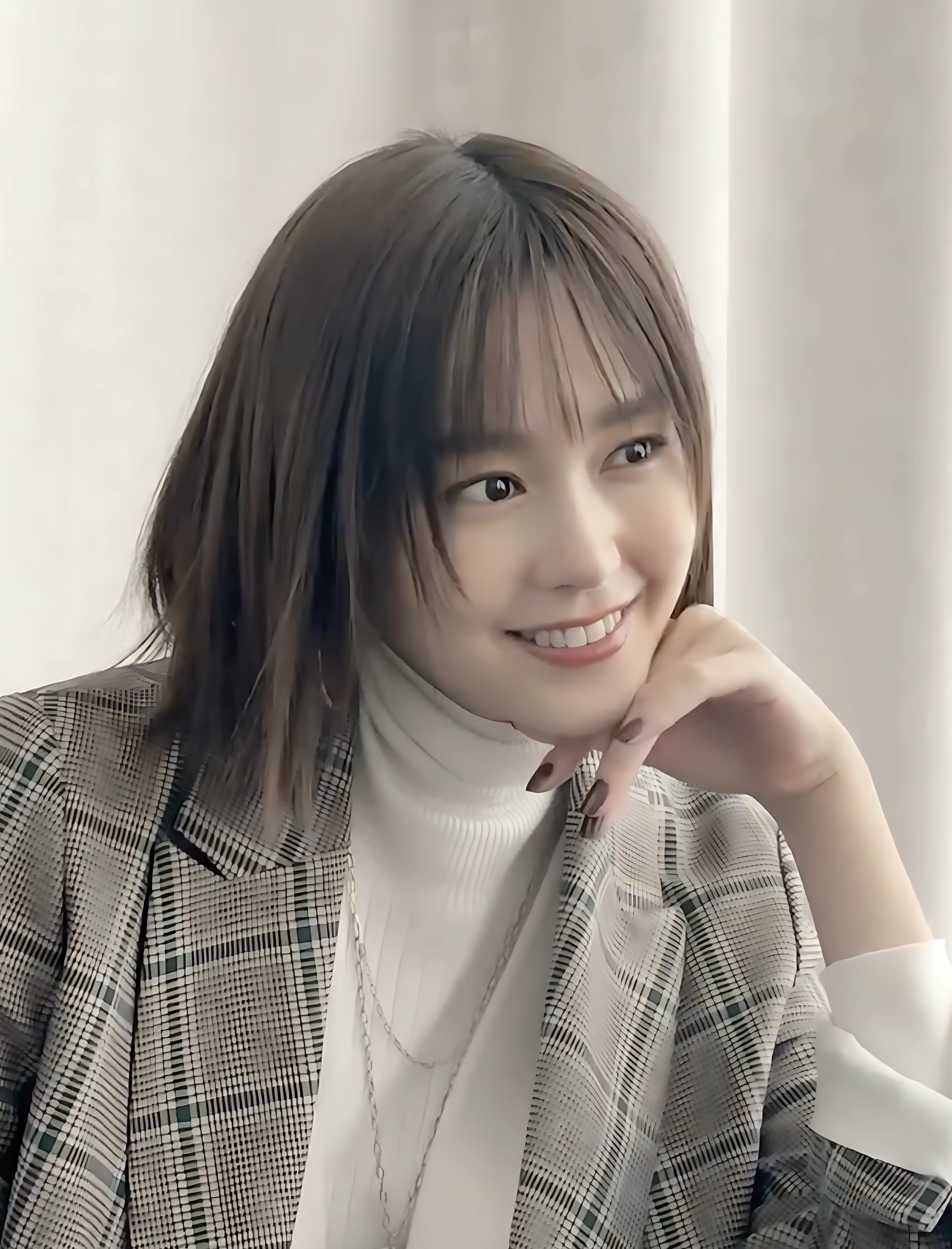
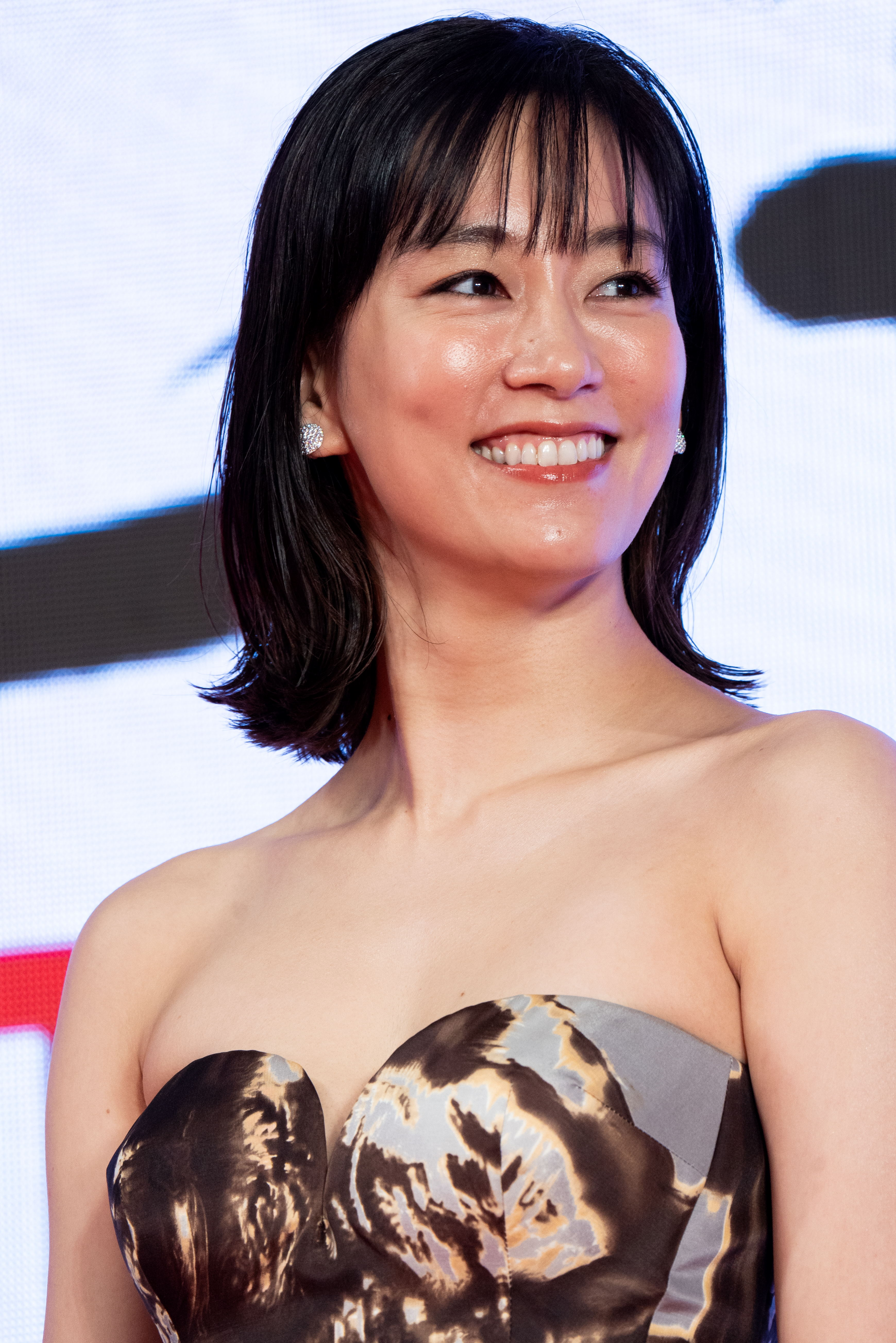
Mirei Kiritani (left, pictured in 2022) and Asami Mizukawa (right, pictured in 2019) portrayed Jonouchi and Maeda in the television drama.

A live-action television series adaptation, re-imagined as a romantic comedy, was announced on January 25, 2017, and ran from April 13, 2017, to June 15, 2017, on Fuji TV at 10 PM. The drama starred Mirei Kiritani as Jonouchi. Asami Mizukawa was cast as Maeda in February 2017, followed by Chiemi Blouson in March 2017 in her acting debut. Kiritani and Mizukawa stated in an interview with Fuji TV that they were excited to play characters with interests and backgrounds different from their own. Regarding Kiritani's casting, Hiromi Okubo, the original creator, tweeted that she was looking forward to seeing Kiritani wear a lab coat.

Series regulars, consisting of original characters created for the drama, include Rika Adachi as Kasumi Kishine, Sae Okazaki as Miyu Morimura, Atsushi Tsutsumishita from the comedy duo Impulse as Motoki Misawa, Ryo Narita as a beautician, and Gekidan Exile member Keita Machida as Takuma Maruo. The theme song is "Joshi Modoki" by JY.

The scene of Jonouchi walking down a runway was filmed at the Tokyo Girls Collection 2017 Spring/Summer show. To promote the television drama, Blouson performed her "career woman" comedy routine with Narita and Machida at the same event, with Narita and Machida taking place of the comedy duo Brillian (who had performed as her backing group for the routine). The members of Brillian also make a cameo appearance in the drama.

No.	Title	Directed by	Written by	Original release date	Japan viewership rating
1	"Bad at Love and Beauty!! An Unfeminine Woman Falls in Love?!"; Transliteration: "Koi mo Biyū mo Nigate!! Joshi Modoki ga Koi o Suru!?" (Japanese: 恋も美容も苦手!!女子モドキが恋をする!?)	Hiroaki Matsuyama	Tomoko Aizawa	April 13, 2017	9.5%
2	"A Great Reversal on Love and Life!! Now, a Transformation!?"; Transliteration: "Koi to Jinsei no Daigyakuten!! Iza Henshin!?" (Japanese: 恋と人生の大逆転!!いざ変身!?)	Hiroaki Matsuyama	Tomoko Aizawa	April 20, 2017	6.4%
3	"A Night Alone With You!! An Unfeminine Woman's Struggle"; Transliteration: "Futarikiri no Yoru!! Joshi Modoki Funtō" (Japanese: 二人きりの夜!!女子モドキ奮闘)	Junsuke Shinada	Tomoko Aizawa	April 27, 2017	6.0%
4	"Feelings That Can't Stop: A Life-threatening Love"; Transliteration: "Mou Tomaranai Omoi: Inochigake no Koi" (Japanese: もう止まらない想い 命懸けの恋)	Junsuke Shinada	Tomoko Aizawa	May 4, 2017	5.5%
5	"Good Luck Will Come to Positive Women!!"; Transliteration: "Pojitibu Joshi ni wa Fukuraitaru!!" (Japanese: ポジティブ女子には福来たる!!)	Hiroaki Matsuyama	Tomoko Aizawa	May 11, 2017	6.5%
6	"Crawl Up from Adversity!!"; Transliteration: "Gyakkyō kara Haiagare!!" (Japanese: 逆境から這い上がれ!!)	Kōzō Nagayama	Tomoko Aizawa	May 18, 2017	6.4%
7	"A Miraculous Sudden Approach in a Night Alone With You!"; Transliteration: "Futarikiri no Yoru no Kiseki no Kyū Sekkin!!" (Japanese: 二人きりの夜に奇跡の急接近!!)	Junsuke Shinada	Tomoko Aizawa	May 25, 2017	5.6%
8	"A Destined Couple!! Finally, a True Kiss"; Transliteration: "Unmei no Futari!! Tsui ni, Shinjitsu no Kisu" (Japanese: 運命の二人!!遂に､真実のキス)	Hiroaki Matsuyama	Tomoko Aizawa	June 1, 2017	5.8%
9	"A Destined Couple!! You've Gotten Ahold of Happiness, Unfeminine Woman!!"; Transliteration: "Unmei no Futari!! Shiawase o Tsukanda, Joshi Modoki!!" (Japanese: 運命の二人!!幸せを掴んだ､女子モドキ!!)	Junsuke Shinada	Tomoko Aizawa	June 8, 2017	5.7%
10	"Love?! Friendship?! The Final Choice and Decision"; Transliteration: "Ren'ai!? Yūjō!? Saigo no Sentaku to Ketsudan" (Japanese: 恋愛!?友情!?最後の選択と決断)	Hiroaki Matsuyama	Tomoko Aizawa	June 15, 2017	6.1%

== See also ==
- Setsuyaku Rock, another manga series by the same author
