= You Can't Expense This! =

- (これは経費で落ちません!)
- Created by: Yūko Aoki (story); Uki (illustration)
- Written by: Chiho Watanabe; Hisako Fujihira; Naomi Hiruta
- Starring: Mikako Tabe; Daiki Shigeoka
- Music by: Toshiyuki Yasuda
- Opening theme: Mao Abe "Dou Shimasuka, Anata Nara"
- Country of origin: Japan
- Original language: Japanese
- No. of seasons: 1
- No. of episodes: 10

Original release
- Release: July 26 – September 27, 2019

You Can't Expense This! (Japanese: これは経費で落ちません!, Hepburn: Kore wa Keihi de Ochimasen!), is a Japanese drama starring Mikako Tabe. It is based on a light literary series by Yūko Aoki with illustrations are by Uki, which a series of short story depicting a 27-year-old female office worker in the accounting department who uncovers internal suspicions and interpersonal dynamics through the receipts submitted by various departments, calmly resolving a range of issues while also navigating her own romantic life. The drama series was aired on NHK from July 26 to September 27, 2019 and is currently available on NHK On-demand and Netflix.

== Plot ==
Sanako Moriwaka works in the accounting department of Tenten Corporation, a mid-sized soap manufacturer. While accounting may seem like a low-profile department compared to sales, it still faces a constant stream of complex challenges.

Tenten Corporation is home to a diverse cast of employees: a sales manager and an accounting manager who are sworn enemies; a PR staffer who serves as the company's public face; a secretary who exploits a special hiring loophole; feuding female colleagues; a contract worker who causes trouble without meaning to; and a mid-career hire who arrogantly preaches "correct" principles. The accounting team must identify and resolve potential issues hidden within the receipts submitted to them.

Amidst this, Taiyo Yamada—a cheerful, smooth-talking sales staffer who is younger than Moriwaka—begins to pursue her romantically. Although initially flustered and thrown off her rhythm, Moriwaka eventually agrees to go out for a meal with him. The story unfolds at a measured pace, centering on two main threads: the interpersonal dynamics within Tenten Corporation and the developing relationship between Moriwaka and Yamada.

== Cast ==
=== Accounting Department ===
- Mikako Tabe as Sanako Moriwaka
- Sairi Ito as Mayu Sakaki
- Mitsuru Fukikoshi as Manager Shibata
- Hiroyuki Hirayama as Yutaro Takura
- Noriko Eguchi as Mika Mabuki

=== Sales Management ===
- Daiki Shigeoka as Taiyo Yamada
- Ren Kiriyama as Shuichi Yamazaki
- Airi Matsui as Kirika Nakajima
- Akihiro Kakuta as Manager Yoshimura

=== Other deparments ===
- Hanae Kan as Mitsuki Kagami
- Nana Katase as Oriko Minase
- Mooroka Moro as Soichiro Nijima
- Becky as Marina Arimoto
