= Shiki Kawabata =

Japanese writer specializing in manga

Shiki Kawabata (Kanji: 川端 志 季; Kawabata Shiki b. in Tokyo, Japan) is a Japanese writer specializing in manga.

She debuted as a manga artist in 2012 with 08:05 no Hengao-san, a short story published in a supplement of the magazine Bessatsu Margaret. Her works are framed within the shōjo genre, which is mainly aimed at a young female audience. Her first series, which started in October 2014, was voted fifth best shōjo of 2015 in Japan.

One of her most well known works is Sora wo Kakeru Yodaka (宇宙〈そら〉を駆けるよだか), first published, in serial format, in Bessatsu Margaret during 2014–2015; later compiled into three volumes by Shueisha. As a result of the success of this work, in 2018 the media service provider Netflix produced an adaptation of Kawabata's manga in the form of a six-part live action miniseries under the title Switched, premiering on 1 August, about a teen whose 'world is turned upside down when a peer robs her of her body, her boyfriend and her identity'.

== Works ==
=== Manga ===
Publication date	Title	Romaji	Publisher
2012	08:05の変顔さん	08:05 no Hengao-san	Shūeisha
2013	クライムクライム hard luck woman	Crime Crime: Hard Luck Woman	Shūeisha
2013–2014	青に光芒	Ao ni Koubou	Shūeisha
2014	眠る街のふたり	Nemuru Machi no Futari	Shūeisha
2014–2015	宇宙（そら）を駆けるよだか	Sora wo Kakeru Yodaka	Shūeisha
2016–2017	箱庭のソレイユ	Hakoniwa no Soleil	Shūeisha
2018 –	僕のオリオン	Boku no Orion	Shūeisha
2018 –	世界で一番早い春	Sekai de ichiban hayai haru	Kōdansha

=== Adaptations ===
- Switched (2018): miniseries based on Sora wo Kakeru Yodaka, produced and distributed by Netflix.
