= West (band) =

Japanese boyband

West.
- Also known as: Johnny's West (2014–2023)
- Origin: Kansai, Japan
- Genres: Pop, J-pop
- Years active: 2014–2026
- Label: ELOV-Label
- Members: Daiki Shigeoka; Junta Nakama; Takahiro Hamada; Akito Kiriyama; Tomohiro Kamiyama
- Past members: Ryusei Fujii; Nozomu Kotaki
- Website: Starto Entertainment; ELOV-Label

West. (stylized as WEST.), formerly known as Johnny's West (ジャニーズWEST, Janīzu Uesuto) (stylized Johnny's WEST), was a boy band consisting of seven members formed under Johnny & Associates, now managed under Starto Entertainment. The members are Daiki Shigeoka, Junta Nakama, Takahiro Hamada, Akito Kiriyama, Tomohiro Kamiyama. The group's name comes from the fact that it originated within the Johnny's talent agency and that the members are from Kansai, the west region of Japan. They were the first group from Kansai Johnny's Junior. to debut. They debuted in 2014 with the single "Eejanaika (ええじゃないか)".

In 2023, the group changed their name to West., before the 10th anniversary of their debut. Their new name was announced through an online stream on October 18. The period (.) in the new name was added to declare that they are (people from) the west (Kansai), and that "though it's (a) small (dot), it's filled with infinite possibilities". The name change occurred in the midst of Johnny Kitagawa's sexual abuse scandal revelations, which saw many of the agency's groups as well as the agency itself undergoing similar rebranding.

Ryusei Fujii, and Nozomu Kotaki announced their departure from the group in August 2026. The remaining members announced the group's September 30 disbandment on September 24, 2026.

== Members ==
Created based on the official website profile and sorted after birthdays. The member colors are used in costumes, CDs, albums, DVDs jackets, and TV shows.

Name	Kanji Name	Date of birth	Place of birth	Member Color
Junta Nakama	中間淳太	October 21, 1987 (age 39)	Hyogo	Yellow
Takahiro Hamada	濵田崇裕	December 19, 1988 (age 37)	Hyogo	Purple
Akito Kiriyama	桐山照史	August 31, 1989 (age 37)	Osaka	Orange
Daiki Shigeoka	重岡大毅	August 26, 1992 (age 34)	Hyogo	Red
Tomohiro Kamiyama	神山智洋	July 1, 1993 (age 33)	Hyogo	Green

=== Former members ===
Name	Kanji Name	Date of birth	Place of birth	Member Color
Ryusei Fujii	藤井流星	August 18, 1993 (age 33)	Osaka	Royal Blue
Nozomu Kotaki	小瀧望	July 30, 1996 (age 30)	Osaka	Pink

== Career ==
=== Pre-debut ===
At the New Year's event "Johnny's Countdown Live," held at Tokyo Dome on December 31, 2013, 4 members of Kansai Johnny's Junior groups (B.A.D.'s Junta Nakama and Akito Kiriyama and 7 West's Daiki Shigeoka and Nozomu Kotaki) were told they would debut under the name "Johnny's West4". The decision for the group's debut was sudden, having occurred only 30 minutes before they were told. By the time of the announcement, the debut song was still being decided.Their group would be the first to debut after the debut of Kanto (Tokyo) Junior's Sexy Zone and A.B.C-Z.

Initially, the group's name was supposed to be "Johnny's West 4". However, the name was changed to "Johnny's West" because it "sounded bad" (having the number "4" in their name was inappropriate due to the Japanese superstition that the number was unlucky). Three more members, Takahiro Hamada, Tomohiro Kamiyama and Ryusei Fujii were later added. This announcement was made during the members' rehearsal on February 5 for the play "Naniwa Samurai Hello TOKYO!! (なにわ侍 ハローTOKYO!!)", held at the Nissay Theatre from February 5 to 28, 2014. This day is said to be West.'s formation day. It was also revealed that initial four members persuaded Johnny Kitagawa to let the other three join the group. They wanted the group to be nationally famous, so they believed that those three members were absolutely essential.

=== 2014 ===
On April 2, it was decided that Akito Kiriyama served as MC with Fumito Kawai from A.B.C-Z at "Shounen Club," where Johnny's West appeared regularly.

On April 20, West had a press conference of debut at Abeno Harukas. After that, they moved to the heliport on the rooftop, 300 m (984 ft) above the ground, and performed their debut song, "Eejanaika." It was also announced that they would be appointed as the Konamon Ambassador (粉もん大使) of the Nippon Konamon Association (日本コナモン協会).

On April 23, West debuted with the release of their 1st single, "Eejanaika (ええじゃないか)."

From April 26 to May 6, the performance "Naniwa Tomoare, Honmani Arigatou! (なにわともあれ、ほんまにありがとう!)", planned to commemorate the CD debut of West, was held at Osaka Shochikuza. From May 11 to 21, the event's Tokyo edition started at Shinbashi Enbujō.

On April 27, Johnny's West held a handshake event at Intex Osaka.

On April 30, the group's blog "Na-Ni-Wa-Bu-Shi! (な・に・わ・ぶ・誌!)" was started on Johnny's web, updated weekly by one of the members.

On July 22 and 23, "Debut Shitemo Eejanaika ~Banzai!! Sono Saki no Ittosho e~ (デビューしてもええじゃないか〜バンザイ!! その先の一等賞へ〜)" was held at Zepp Namba Osaka, and on July 28 and 29 at Zepp Diver City Tokyo.

On August 2, the play, "Typhoon n Dreamer (台風n Dreamer)," started at Osaka Shochikuza.

On August 6, the 1st studio album, "Go West Yōi Don! (go WEST よーいドン!)," was released. On August 28 and 29, a commemorative party for the release of the 1st album, "Go West Yōi Don!," was held at Yokohama Arena.

On September 3, the play, "Typhoon n Dreamer," started at the Nissay Theatre.

On October 8, the 2nd single, "Zipang Ōkini Daisakusen/Yume wo Dakishimete (ジパング・おおきに大作戦/夢を抱きしめて)," was released.

On December 17, the 1st DVD & Blu-ray, "Naniwa Samurai Hello Tokyo!!," was released.

=== 2015 ===
From January 2 to 6, the group's 1st concert, "Johnny's WEST 1st Concert Ippatsumeeeeeee! (ジャニーズWEST 1stコンサート 一発めぇぇぇぇぇぇぇ!)," was held at Yokohama Arena and Osaka Castle Hall. On October 7, the concert's DVD & Blu-ray was released.

On January 10, the play, "Naniwa Samurai Dangoro Ichiza (なにわ侍団五郎一座)," started at Nissay Theatre.

On February 4, the 3rd single, "Zundoko Paradise (ズンドコ パラダイス)," was released.

On April 22, Extended Album, "Paripipo (パリピポ)," was released.

From May 4 to June 7, the 1st tour, "Johnny's WEST 1st Tour Paripipo (ジャニーズWEST 1st Tour パリピポ)," was held at Yokohama Arena, Nagoya International Exhibition Hall, Osaka Castle Hall, Hiroshima City Cultural Exchange Hall, Fukuoka Sunpalace, and Kobe World Memorial Hall.

On June 17, the 2nd DVD & Blu-ray, "Naniwa Tomoare, Honmani Arigatou!," was released.

On July 29, the 4th single, "Bari Hapi (バリ ハピ)," was released.

On December 9, the 2nd studio album, "Luckyyyyyyy7 (ラッキィィィィィィィ7)," was released.

=== 2016 ===
From January 3 to April 3, the tour "Johnny's WEST Concert Tour 2016 Luckyyyyyyy7 (ジャニーズWEST CONCERT TOUR 2016 ラッキィィィィィィィ7)," was held at Osaka Castle Hall, Yokohama Arena, Nippon Gaishi Hall, Hiroshima Prefectural Sports Center, Fukuoka Convention Center, Toki Messe, and Sekisui Heim Super Arena.

On April 20, the 5th single, "Gyakuten Winner (逆転Winner)," was released. It was used as the first season opening of the Ace Attorney anime.

On May 18, 4th DVD & Blu-ray, "West 1st Tour Paripipo," was released.

On July 24, West's official fan club was established.

On July 27, the 6th single, "Jinsei wa Subarashī (人生は素晴らしい)," was released.

On September 27, it was announced that West's first dome performance would be held. On December 24 and 25, the 1st dome concert "Johnny's WEST 1st Dome Live 24 (Nishi) kara Kansha Todokemasu (ジャニーズWEST 1st ドーム LIVE ♡24(ニシ)から感謝 届けます♡)," was held at Kyocera Dome Osaka.

On October 19, ELOV-Label, a record company, opened a Twitter account to promote the album "Nawest (なうぇすと)".

On November 30, the 3rd studio album, "Nawest," and the 5th DVD & Blu-ray, "West Concert Tour 2016 Luckyyyyyyy7," were released.

=== 2017 ===
From January 3 to May7, the tour, "Johnny's WEST Live Tour 2017 Nawest (ジャニーズWEST LIVE TOUR 2017 なうぇすと)," was held at Yokohama Arena, Sun Dome Fukui, Fukuoka Convention Center, Sekisui Heim Super Arena, Nippon Gaishi Hall, Ecopa Arena, Osaka Castle Hall, Hokkaido Prefectural Sports Center, and Hiroshima Prefectural Sports Center.

On March 25, it was announced that West would appear in Netflix TV show, "Honō no Tenkōsei."

On April 23, Shigeoka announced that the serialization of "Na-Ni-Wa-Bu-Shi!" would be updated once every two days.

On May 24, the 6th DVD & Blu-ray, "West 1st Dome Live 24-kara Kansha Todokemasu," was released.

On June 21, the 7th single, "Osaka Ai Eye Ai/Ya! Hot! Hot! (おーさか☆愛・EYE・哀/Ya! Hot! Hot!)," was released.

On October 25, the 7th DVD & Blu-ray, "West Live Tour 2017 Nawest," was released.

On November 10, "Honō no Tenkōsei REBORN" was started broadcasting on Netflix.

On November 22, the 8th single, "Bokura Kyō mo Ikiteiru/Kangaeru na, Moero!! (僕ら今日も生きている/考えるな、燃えろ!!)," was released.

The band performed "Another 1% (もう1％, Mou 1%)" for the Japanese dub of The Lego Ninjago Movie.

=== 2018 ===
On January 2, the 4th studio album, WESTival, was released.

From January 3 to May 20, the tour, "West Live Tour 2018 WESTival," was held at Yokohama Arena, Fukuoka Convention Center, Ecopa Arena, Nippon Gaishi Hall, Kobe World Memorial Hall, Sekisui Heim Super Arena, Toki Messe, Osaka Castle Hall, Hiroshima Prefectural Sports Center, and Hokkaido Prefectural Sports Center. On October 24, the DVD & Blu-ray for the concert was released.

On May 7, the 9th single, "Principal no Kimi e/Dragon Dog (プリンシパルの君へ/ドラゴンドッグ)" was released.

On August 15, the 10th single, "Start Dash (スタートダッシュ)," was released. It became first opening single from Captain Tsubasa (2018) by David Production.

On December 5, the 5th studio album, "WESTV!," was released.

=== 2019 ===
From January 3 to March 24, the tour, "West Live Tour 2019 WESTV!," was held at Yokohama Arena, Nippon Gaishi Hall, Toki Messe, Fukuoka Convention Center, Osaka Castle Hall, Sekisui Heim Super Arena, Kobe World Memorial Hall, and Hokkaido Prefectural Sports Center. On July 10, the DVD & Blu-ray for the concert was released.

On January 30, the 11th single, "Homechigirisuto/Kizudarakeno Ai (ホメチギリスト/傷だらけの愛)," was released. Kizudarakeno Ai became second opening single from Captain Tsubasa.

On April 24, the 12th single, "Ame Nochi Hare (アメノチハレ)," was released.

On May 29, DVD & Blu-ray, "Honō no Tenkōsei REBORN," was released.

On June 1, due to the termination of the business of ELOV-Label Co., Ltd., which was West's label, they transferred to the label "ELOV-Label Record" of J Storm Co., Ltd.

On July 25, West was appointed as a tournament special supporter for 2019 FIVB Volleyball Women's World Cup (opening on September 14). They were the first time the group had been a special supporter since the debut.

On October 9, the 13th single, "Big Shot!!," was released.

=== 2020 ===
On March 18, the 6th studio album, W trouble, was released.

From March 29 to May 24, the tour "West Live Tour 2020 W trouble" was supposed to be held at Fukuoka Convention Center, Makomanai Ice Arena, Sekisui Heim Super Arena, Toki Messe, Osaka Castle Hall, Saitama Super Arena, and Ecopa Arena. However, all the concerts were canceled due to the COVID-19 pandemic. Afterward, the concerts were rescheduled and planned to be held at the same venues, but those were canceled again since Starto Entertainment announced that they would refrain from large-scale concerts until the end of 2020. The tour was held online from December 11 to 13.

On May 13, it was announced that a limited-time unit "Twenty★Twenty" of 75 artists from the Starto Entertainment talent agency, including members of West, was formed as part of the "Smile Up! Project," a support activity to prevent the spread of COVID-19.

On June 24, the 14th single, "Shōko (証拠)," was released.

On July 28, the online streaming event, "Johnny's DREAM IsLAND 2020→2025 ~Daisuki na Kono Machi Kara~," was held at Expo Commemoration Park with Kanjani Eight and Kansai Johnny's Jr. West performed at Osaka Shochikuza on August 1.

=== 2021 ===
On January 13, the 15th single, "Shūkan Umaku Iku Yōbi (週刊うまくいく曜日)," was released.

On March 17, the 7th studio album, "rainboW," was released.

From April 3 to June 20, the tour, "West Live Tour 2021 rainboW," was held at Makomanai Ice Arena, Sekisui Heim Super Arena, Nippon Gaishi Hall, Toki Messe, Saitama Super Arena, and Grand Messe Kumamoto. A concert at Osaka Castle Hall was canceled due to quasi-emergency due to the COVID-19 pandemic.

On May 5, the 16th single, "Something New (サムシング・ニュー)," was released.

On July 28, the 17th single, "Dekkai Ai/Kidoairaku (でっかい愛/喜努愛楽)," was released.

On October 6, the 10th DVD & Blu-ray, "West Live Tour 2020 W trouble," was released.

=== 2022 ===
On January 19, the 18th single, "Reimei/Susumushika nē (黎明/進むしかねぇ)," was released.

On March 9, the 8th studio album, "Mixed Juice," will be released.

From March 20 to June 12, the tour, "West Live Tour 2022 Mixed Juice," will be held at Ecopa Arena, Grand Messe Kumamoto, Sekisui Heim Super Arena, Nippon Gaishi Hall, Osaka Municipal Central Gymnasium, Pia Arena MM, Osaka Castle Hall, Toki Messe, and Makomanai Ice Arena.

=== 2026 ===
From October 2026 till January 2027, Akito Kiriyama will star as The Engineer in the musical Miss Saigon.

On August 30, members Ryusei Fujii and Nozomu Kotaki announced their departure from the group. The pair will continue activities within Starto. Starto had been in talks with the remaining members regarding their future, including the possibility of them continuing as a 5–member group. On September 24 it was announced that the members had taken the decision to disband, ceasing their activities on September 30. The five members will continue in the agency under individual contracts starting October 1.

== Discography ==
West discography
- Studio albums: 12
- EPs: 1
- Singles: 25

=== Studio albums ===
#	Title	Japanese title	Release date	Year	Edition/Formats	Label	Peaks		Certifications	First week sales
#	Title	Japanese title	Release date	Year	Edition/Formats	Label	JPN (Note: Sources for chart positions are as follows: Go West Yōi Don!, Luckyyyyyyy 7, Nawest, WESTival, WESTV!, W trouble, rainboW, Mixed Juice.)	JPN Hot (Note: The Billboard Japan Hot Albums chart was established in June 2015. Sources for chart positions are as follows: Luckyyyyyyy 7, Nawest, WESTival, WESTV!, W Trouble, rainboW, Mixed Juice, Power, Award, A.H.O. (Audio Hang Out), and Yujitsumuni)	Certifications	First week sales
1	Go West Yōi Don!	go WEST よーいドン!	August 6	2014	First Edition (CD+DVD)	ELOV-Label	1	—	RIAJ: Gold	JPN: 83,000
1	Go West Yōi Don!	go WEST よーいドン!	August 6	2014	Normal Edition (CD)	ELOV-Label	1	—	RIAJ: Gold	JPN: 83,000
2	Luckyyyyyyy 7	ラッキィィィィィィィ7	December 9	2015	First Edition (CD+DVD)	ELOV-Label	2	2	RIAJ: Gold	JPN: 85,000
2	Luckyyyyyyy 7	ラッキィィィィィィィ7	December 9	2015	Normal Edition (CD)	ELOV-Label	2	2	RIAJ: Gold	JPN: 85,000
3	Nawest	なうぇすと	November 30	2016	First Edition (CD+DVD)	ELOV-Label	1	1	RIAJ: Gold	JPN: 86,000
3	Nawest	なうぇすと	November 30	2016	Normal Edition (CD)	ELOV-Label	1	1	RIAJ: Gold	JPN: 86,000
4	WESTival	WESTival	January 2	2018	First Edition (CD+DVD)	ELOV-Label	1	1	RIAJ: Gold	JPN: 105,000
4	WESTival	WESTival	January 2	2018	Normal Edition (CD)	ELOV-Label	1	1	RIAJ: Gold	JPN: 105,000
5	WESTV!	WESTV!	December 5	2018	First Edition (CD+DVD)	ELOV-Label	2	2	RIAJ: Gold	JPN: 96,000
5	WESTV!	WESTV!	December 5	2018	Normal Edition (CD)	ELOV-Label	2	2	RIAJ: Gold	JPN: 96,000
6	W Trouble	W trouble	March 18	2020	First Edition A (CD+DVD)	ELOV-Label	1	1		JPN: 208,000
6	W Trouble	W trouble	March 18	2020	First Edition B (CD+DVD)	ELOV-Label	1	1		JPN: 208,000
6	W Trouble	W trouble	March 18	2020	Normal Edition (CD)	ELOV-Label	1	1		JPN: 208,000
6	W Trouble	W trouble	March 18	2020	Online Limited Edition (CD+T-shirt)	ELOV-Label	1	1		JPN: 208,000
7	rainboW	rainboW	March 17	2021	First Edition A (CD+DVD)	ELOV-Label	1	1	RIAJ: Platinum	JPN: 246,000
7	rainboW	rainboW	March 17	2021	First Edition B (CDs)	ELOV-Label	1	1	RIAJ: Platinum	JPN: 246,000
7	rainboW	rainboW	March 17	2021	Normal Edition (CD)	ELOV-Label	1	1	RIAJ: Platinum	JPN: 246,000
7	rainboW	rainboW	March 17	2021	Online Limited Edition (CD+T-shirt)	ELOV-Label	1	1	RIAJ: Platinum	JPN: 246,000
8	Mixed Juice	Mixed Juice	March 9	2022	First Edition A (CD+DVD)	ELOV-Label	1	1		JPN: 213,179
8	Mixed Juice	Mixed Juice	March 9	2022	First Edition B (CD+DVD)	ELOV-Label	1	1		JPN: 213,179
8	Mixed Juice	Mixed Juice	March 9	2022	Normal Edition (CD)	ELOV-Label	1	1		JPN: 213,179
9	Power	Power	March 1	2023		ELOV-Label	1	1		JPN: 248,942
10	Award	Award	March 13	2024		ELOV-Label	1	1		JPN: 234,128
11	A.H.O. (Audio Hang Out)	A.H.O. -Audio Hang Out- (エー・エイチ・オー オーディオ・ハング・アウト)	March 12	2025		ELOV-Label	1	1		JPN: 183,027
12	Yujitsumuni	唯一無二	March 10	2026		ELOV-Label	1	2	RIAJ: Platinum	JPN: 224,214

=== Extended plays ===
#	Title	Japanese title	Release date	Year	Edition/Formats	Label	Peak	Certifications	First week sales
#	Title	Japanese title	Release date	Year	Edition/Formats	Label	JPN	Certifications	First week sales
1	Paripipo	パリピポ	April 22	2015	First Edition (CD+DVD)	ELOV-Label	1	RIAJ: Gold	JPN: 81,000
1	Paripipo	パリピポ	April 22	2015	Normal Edition (CD)	ELOV-Label	1	RIAJ: Gold	JPN: 81,000

=== Singles ===
#	Title	Japanese title	Release date	Year	Edition/Formats	Label	Peaks		Certifications	First week sales	Album
#	Title	Japanese title	Release date	Year	Edition/Formats	Label	JPN (Note: Sources for chart positions are as follows: "Eejanaika", "Zipang Ōkini Daisakusen/Yume o Dakishimete", "Zundoko Paradise", "Bari Hapi", "Gyakuten Winner", "Jinsei wa Subarashī", "Osaka Ai Eye Ai/Ya! Hot! Hot!", "Bokura Kyō mo Ikiteiru/Kangaeru na, Moero!!", "Principal no Kimi e", "Start Dash", "Homechigirisuto / Kizudarake no Ai", "Big Shot!!" "Shōko" "Shūkan Umaku Iku Yōbi" "Something New" "Dekkai Ai/Kidoairaku" "Reimei/Susumushika nē")	JPN Hot (Note: Sources for chart positions are as follows: "Eejanaika", "Zipang Ōkini Daisakusen", "Zundoko Paradise", "Bari Hapi" "Gyakuten Winner", "Jinsei wa Subarashī", "Osaka Ai Eye Ai", "Bokura Kyō mo Ikiteiru", "Principal no Kimi e", "Start Dash", "Homechigirisuto / Kizudarake no Ai", "Ame Nochi Hare", "Big Shot!!", "Shōko", "Shūkan Umaku Iku Yōbi", "Something New", "Dekkai Ai/Kidoairaku", "Reimei/Susumushika nē", "Hoshi no Ame", "Shiawasa no Hana", "Zetsumei", "Heart", "Mā Ikka!", "West Side Soul!", "Aishū")	Certifications	First week sales	Album
1	"Eejanaika"	ええじゃないか	April 23	2014	First Edition (Naniwa Edition)（CD+DVD）	ELOV-Label	1	1	RIAJ: Platinum	JPN: 262,000	Go West Yōi Don!
1	"Eejanaika"	ええじゃないか	April 23	2014	First Edition (Ninjani Edition)（CD+DVD）	ELOV-Label	1	1	RIAJ: Platinum	JPN: 262,000	Go West Yōi Don!
1	"Eejanaika"	ええじゃないか	April 23	2014	First Edition (WEST Edition)（CD+DVD）	ELOV-Label	1	1	RIAJ: Platinum	JPN: 262,000	Go West Yōi Don!
1	"Eejanaika"	ええじゃないか	April 23	2014	Normal Edition（CD）	ELOV-Label	1	1	RIAJ: Platinum	JPN: 262,000	Go West Yōi Don!
1	"Eejanaika"	ええじゃないか	April 23	2014	MY BEST CD Edition	ELOV-Label	1	1	RIAJ: Platinum	JPN: 262,000	Go West Yōi Don!
2	"Zipang Ōkini Daisakusen"	ジパング・おおきに大作戦	October 8	2014	First Edition A（CD+DVD）	ELOV-Label	2	2	RIAJ: Gold	JPN: 110,000	Luckyyyyyyy 7
2	"Zipang Ōkini Daisakusen"	ジパング・おおきに大作戦	October 8	2014	First Edition B（CD+DVD）	ELOV-Label	2	2	RIAJ: Gold	JPN: 110,000	Luckyyyyyyy 7
2	"Yume wo Dakishimete"	夢を抱きしめて	October 8	2014	First Edition C（CD）	ELOV-Label	2	2	RIAJ: Gold	JPN: 110,000	Luckyyyyyyy 7
2	"Yume wo Dakishimete"	夢を抱きしめて	October 8	2014	Normal Edition（CD）	ELOV-Label	2	2	RIAJ: Gold	JPN: 110,000	Luckyyyyyyy 7
3	"Zundoko Paradise"	ズンドコ パラダイス	February 4	2015	First Edition A（CD+DVD）	ELOV-Label	1	1	RIAJ: Gold	JPN: 97,000	Luckyyyyyyy 7
3	"Zundoko Paradise"	ズンドコ パラダイス	February 4	2015	First Edition B（CD+DVD）	ELOV-Label	1	1	RIAJ: Gold	JPN: 97,000	Luckyyyyyyy 7
3	"Zundoko Paradise"	ズンドコ パラダイス	February 4	2015	Normal Edition（CD）	ELOV-Label	1	1	RIAJ: Gold	JPN: 97,000	Luckyyyyyyy 7
4	"Bari Hapi"	バリ ハピ	July 29	2015	First Edition A（CD+DVD）	ELOV-Label	1	1	RIAJ: Gold	JPN: 101,000	Luckyyyyyyy 7
4	"Bari Hapi"	バリ ハピ	July 29	2015	First Edition B（CD+DVD）	ELOV-Label	1	1	RIAJ: Gold	JPN: 101,000	Luckyyyyyyy 7
4	"Bari Hapi"	バリ ハピ	July 29	2015	Normal Edition（CD）	ELOV-Label	1	1	RIAJ: Gold	JPN: 101,000	Luckyyyyyyy 7
5	"Gyakuten Winner"	逆転Winner	April 20	2016	First Edition A（CD+DVD）	ELOV-Label	1	1	RIAJ: Gold	JPN: 115,000	WESTival
5	"Gyakuten Winner"	逆転Winner	April 20	2016	First Edition B（CD+DVD）	ELOV-Label	1	1	RIAJ: Gold	JPN: 115,000	WESTival
5	"Gyakuten Winner"	逆転Winner	April 20	2016	Normal Edition（CD）	ELOV-Label	1	1	RIAJ: Gold	JPN: 115,000	WESTival
6	"Jinsei wa Subarashī"	人生は素晴らしい	July 27	2016	First Edition A（CD+DVD）	ELOV-Label	2	2	RIAJ: Gold	JPN: 122,000	WESTival
6	"Jinsei wa Subarashī"	人生は素晴らしい	July 27	2016	First Edition B（CD+DVD）	ELOV-Label	2	2	RIAJ: Gold	JPN: 122,000	WESTival
6	"Jinsei wa Subarashī"	人生は素晴らしい	July 27	2016	Normal Edition（CD）	ELOV-Label	2	2	RIAJ: Gold	JPN: 122,000	WESTival
7	"Osaka Ai Eye Ai"	おーさか☆愛・EYE・哀	June 21	2017	First Edition A（CD+DVD）	ELOV-Label	1	2	RIAJ: Gold	JPN: 138,000	WESTival
7	"Osaka Ai Eye Ai"	おーさか☆愛・EYE・哀	June 21	2017	First Edition B（CD+DVD）	ELOV-Label	1	2	RIAJ: Gold	JPN: 138,000	WESTival
7	"Ya! Hot! Hot!"	Ya! Hot! Hot!	June 21	2017	Normal Edition（CD）	ELOV-Label	1	2	RIAJ: Gold	JPN: 138,000	WESTival
8	"Bokura Kyō mo Ikiteiru"	僕ら今日も生きている	November 22	2017	First Edition A（CD+DVD）	ELOV-Label	2	2	RIAJ: Gold	JPN: 127,000	WESTV!
8	"Bokura Kyō mo Ikiteiru"	僕ら今日も生きている	November 22	2017	First Edition B (CD+DVD)	ELOV-Label	2	2	RIAJ: Gold	JPN: 127,000	WESTV!
8	"Kangaeru na, Moero!!"	考えるな、燃えろ!!	November 22	2017	Normal Edition（CD）	ELOV-Label	2	2	RIAJ: Gold	JPN: 127,000	WESTV!
9	"Principal no Kimi e"	プリンシパルの君へ	March 7	2018	First Edition A（CD+DVD）	ELOV-Label	2	2	RIAJ: Gold	JPN: 148,000	WESTV!
9	"Principal no Kimi e"	プリンシパルの君へ	March 7	2018	First Edition B（CD+DVD）	ELOV-Label	2	2	RIAJ: Gold	JPN: 148,000	WESTV!
9	"Dragon Dog"	ドラゴンドッグ	March 7	2018	Normal Edition（CD）	ELOV-Label	2	2	RIAJ: Gold	JPN: 148,000	WESTV!
10	"Start Dash"	スタートダッシュ!	August 15	2018	First Edition A（CD+DVD）	ELOV-Label	2	2	RIAJ: Gold	JPN: 129,000	WESTV!
10	"Start Dash"	スタートダッシュ!	August 15	2018	First Edition B（CD+DVD）	ELOV-Label	2	2	RIAJ: Gold	JPN: 129,000	WESTV!
10	"Start Dash"	スタートダッシュ!	August 15	2018	Normal Edition（CD）	ELOV-Label	2	2	RIAJ: Gold	JPN: 129,000	WESTV!
11	"Homechigirisuto"	ホメチギリスト	January 30	2019	First Edition A（CD+DVD）	ELOV-Label	1	1	RIAJ: Gold	JPN: 138,000	W trouble
11	"Homechigirisuto"	ホメチギリスト	January 30	2019	First Edition B（CD+DVD）	ELOV-Label	1	1	RIAJ: Gold	JPN: 138,000	W trouble
11	"Kizudarake no Ai"	傷だらけの愛	January 30	2019	Normal Edition（CD）	ELOV-Label	1	1	RIAJ: Gold	JPN: 138,000	W trouble
12	"Ame Nochi Hare"	アメノチハレ	April 24	2019	First Edition A（CD+DVD）	ELOV-Label	1	1	RIAJ: Gold	JPN: 159,000	W trouble
12	"Ame Nochi Hare"	アメノチハレ	April 24	2019	First Edition B（CD+DVD）	ELOV-Label	1	1	RIAJ: Gold	JPN: 159,000	W trouble
12	"Ame Nochi Hare"	アメノチハレ	April 24	2019	Normal Edition（CD）	ELOV-Label	1	1	RIAJ: Gold	JPN: 159,000	W trouble
13	"Big Shot!!"	Big Shot!!	October 9	2019	First Edition A（CD+DVD）	ELOV-Label	1	1	RIAJ: Gold	JPN: 167,000	W trouble
13	"Big Shot!!"	Big Shot!!	October 9	2019	First Edition B（CD+DVD）	ELOV-Label	1	1	RIAJ: Gold	JPN: 167,000	W trouble
13	"Big Shot!!"	Big Shot!!	October 9	2019	Normal Edition（CD）	ELOV-Label	1	1	RIAJ: Gold	JPN: 167,000	W trouble
14	"Shōko"	証拠	June 24	2020	First Edition A（CD+DVD）	ELOV-Label	1	1	RIAJ: Platinum	JPN: 212,000	rainboW
14	"Shōko"	証拠	June 24	2020	First Edition B（CD+DVD）	ELOV-Label	1	1	RIAJ: Platinum	JPN: 212,000	rainboW
14	"Shōko"	証拠	June 24	2020	Normal Edition（CD）	ELOV-Label	1	1	RIAJ: Platinum	JPN: 212,000	rainboW
15	"Shūkan Umaku Iku Yōbi"	週刊うまくいく曜日	January 13	2021	First Edition A（CD+DVD）	ELOV-Label	1	1	RIAJ: Platinum	JPN: 227,000	rainboW
15	"Shūkan Umaku Iku Yōbi"	週刊うまくいく曜日	January 13	2021	First Edition B（CD+DVD）	ELOV-Label	1	1	RIAJ: Platinum	JPN: 227,000	rainboW
15	"Shūkan Umaku Iku Yōbi"	週刊うまくいく曜日	January 13	2021	Normal Edition（CD）	ELOV-Label	1	1	RIAJ: Platinum	JPN: 227,000	rainboW
16	"Something New"	サムシング・ニュー	May 5	2021	First Edition A（CD+DVD）	ELOV-Label	1	1	RIAJ: Platinum	JPN: 218,000	Mixed Juice
16	"Something New"	サムシング・ニュー	May 5	2021	First Edition B（CD+DVD）	ELOV-Label	1	1	RIAJ: Platinum	JPN: 218,000	Mixed Juice
16	"Something New"	サムシング・ニュー	May 5	2021	Normal Edition（CD）	ELOV-Label	1	1	RIAJ: Platinum	JPN: 218,000	Mixed Juice
17	"Dekkai Ai"	でっかい愛	July 28	2021	First Edition A（CD+DVD）	ELOV-Label	1	1	RIAJ: Platinum	JPN: 203,000	Mixed Juice
17	"Kidoairaku"	喜努愛楽	July 28	2021	First Edition B（CD+DVD）	ELOV-Label	1	1	RIAJ: Platinum	JPN: 203,000	Mixed Juice
17	"Kidoairaku"	喜努愛楽	July 28	2021	Normal Edition（CD）	ELOV-Label	1	1	RIAJ: Platinum	JPN: 203,000	Mixed Juice
18	"Reimei"	黎明	January 19	2022	First Edition A（CD+DVD）	ELOV-Label	1	2	RIAJ: TBA	JPN: 195,000	Mixed Juice
18	"Reimei"	黎明	January 19	2022	First Edition B（CD+DVD）	ELOV-Label	1	2	RIAJ: TBA	JPN: 195,000	Mixed Juice
18	"Susumushika nē"	進むしかねぇ	January 19	2022	Normal Edition（CD）	ELOV-Label	1	2	RIAJ: TBA	JPN: 195,000	Mixed Juice
19	"Hoshi no Ame"	星の雨	August 3	2022		ELOV-Label	1	1		JPN: 291,727	Power
20	"Shiawase no Hana"	しあわせの花	June 7	2023		ELOV-Label	1	3		JPN: 216,313	-
21	"Zetsumei" / "Beautiful" / "As One"	絶体絶命	October 25	2023		ELOV-Label	1	3		JPN: 299,584	-
22	"Heart" / "Fate"	ハート	April 24	2024		ELOV-Label	1	6		JPN: 265,995	-
23	"Mā Ikka!"	まぁいっか!	September 10	2024		ELOV-Label	1	2		JPN: 242,275	-
24	"West Side Soul!" / "Big Love Song"	ウェッサイソウル!/BIG LOVE SONG	May 7	2025		ELOV-Label	1	4		JPN: 223,811	-
25	"Aishū"	愛執	January 21	2026		ELOV-Label		5			-

=== DVDs ===
#	Title	Japanese title	Release date	Year	Edition/Formats	Label	Peaks	Certifications	First week sales
#	Title	Japanese title	Release date	Year	Edition/Formats	Label	JPN	Certifications	First week sales
1	Naniwa Samurai Hello Tokyo!!	なにわ侍 ハローTOKYO!!	December 17	2014	First Edition (DVD)	ELOV-Label	3	RIAJ: —	JPN: 20,000
1	Naniwa Samurai Hello Tokyo!!	なにわ侍 ハローTOKYO!!	December 17	2014	Normal Edition (DVD)	ELOV-Label	3	RIAJ: —	JPN: 20,000
1	Naniwa Samurai Hello Tokyo!!	なにわ侍 ハローTOKYO!!	December 17	2014	First Edition (Blu-ray)	ELOV-Label	3	RIAJ: —	JPN: 20,000
1	Naniwa Samurai Hello Tokyo!!	なにわ侍 ハローTOKYO!!	December 17	2014	Normal Edition (Blu-ray)	ELOV-Label	3	RIAJ: —	JPN: 20,000
2	Naniwa Tomoare, Honmani Arigatou!	なにわともあれ、ほんまにありがとう!	June 17	2015	First Edition (DVD)	ELOV-Label	1	RIAJ: —	JPN: 29,000 (DVD); JPN: 19,000 (Blu-ray)
2	Naniwa Tomoare, Honmani Arigatou!	なにわともあれ、ほんまにありがとう!	June 17	2015	Normal Edition (DVD)	ELOV-Label	1	RIAJ: —	JPN: 29,000 (DVD); JPN: 19,000 (Blu-ray)
2	Naniwa Tomoare, Honmani Arigatou!	なにわともあれ、ほんまにありがとう!	June 17	2015	First Edition (Blu-ray)	ELOV-Label	2	RIAJ: —	JPN: 29,000 (DVD); JPN: 19,000 (Blu-ray)
2	Naniwa Tomoare, Honmani Arigatou!	なにわともあれ、ほんまにありがとう!	June 17	2015	Normal Edition (Blu-ray)	ELOV-Label	2	RIAJ: —	JPN: 29,000 (DVD); JPN: 19,000 (Blu-ray)
3	West 1st Concert Ippatsumeeeeeee!	ジャニーズWEST 1stコンサート 一発めぇぇぇぇぇぇぇ!	October 7	2015	First Edition (DVD)	ELOV-Label	1	RIAJ: —	JPN: 31,000 (DVD); JPN: 22,000 (Blu-ray)
3	West 1st Concert Ippatsumeeeeeee!	ジャニーズWEST 1stコンサート 一発めぇぇぇぇぇぇぇ!	October 7	2015	Normal Edition (DVD)	ELOV-Label	1	RIAJ: —	JPN: 31,000 (DVD); JPN: 22,000 (Blu-ray)
3	West 1st Concert Ippatsumeeeeeee!	ジャニーズWEST 1stコンサート 一発めぇぇぇぇぇぇぇ!	October 7	2015	First Edition (Blu-ray)	ELOV-Label	2	RIAJ: —	JPN: 31,000 (DVD); JPN: 22,000 (Blu-ray)
3	West 1st Concert Ippatsumeeeeeee!	ジャニーズWEST 1stコンサート 一発めぇぇぇぇぇぇぇ!	October 7	2015	Normal Edition (Blu-ray)	ELOV-Label	2	RIAJ: —	JPN: 31,000 (DVD); JPN: 22,000 (Blu-ray)
4	West 1st Tour Paripipo	ジャニーズWEST 1st Tour パリピポ	May 18	2016	First Edition (DVD)	ELOV-Label	1	RIAJ: —	JPN: 38,000 (DVD); JPN: 30,000 (Blu-ray)
4	West 1st Tour Paripipo	ジャニーズWEST 1st Tour パリピポ	May 18	2016	Normal Edition (DVD)	ELOV-Label	1	RIAJ: —	JPN: 38,000 (DVD); JPN: 30,000 (Blu-ray)
4	West 1st Tour Paripipo	ジャニーズWEST 1st Tour パリピポ	May 18	2016	First Edition (Blu-ray)	ELOV-Label	1	RIAJ: —	JPN: 38,000 (DVD); JPN: 30,000 (Blu-ray)
4	West 1st Tour Paripipo	ジャニーズWEST 1st Tour パリピポ	May 18	2016	Normal Edition (Blu-ray)	ELOV-Label	1	RIAJ: —	JPN: 38,000 (DVD); JPN: 30,000 (Blu-ray)
5	West Concert Tour 2016 Luckyyyyyyy7	ジャニーズWEST CONCERT TOUR 2016 ラッキィィィィィィィ7	November 30	2016	First Edition (DVD)	ELOV-Label	1	RIAJ: —	JPN: 39,000 (DVD); JPN: 30,000 (Blu-ray)
5	West Concert Tour 2016 Luckyyyyyyy7	ジャニーズWEST CONCERT TOUR 2016 ラッキィィィィィィィ7	November 30	2016	Normal Edition (DVD)	ELOV-Label	1	RIAJ: —	JPN: 39,000 (DVD); JPN: 30,000 (Blu-ray)
5	West Concert Tour 2016 Luckyyyyyyy7	ジャニーズWEST CONCERT TOUR 2016 ラッキィィィィィィィ7	November 30	2016	First Edition (Blu-ray)	ELOV-Label	1	RIAJ: —	JPN: 39,000 (DVD); JPN: 30,000 (Blu-ray)
5	West Concert Tour 2016 Luckyyyyyyy7	ジャニーズWEST CONCERT TOUR 2016 ラッキィィィィィィィ7	November 30	2016	Normal Edition (Blu-ray)	ELOV-Label	1	RIAJ: —	JPN: 39,000 (DVD); JPN: 30,000 (Blu-ray)
6	West 1st Dome Live 24-kara Kansha Todokemasu	ジャニーズWEST 1st ドーム LIVE ♡24(ニシ)から感謝 届けます♡	May 24	2017	First Edition (DVD)	ELOV-Label	1	RIAJ: Gold	JPN: 51,000 (DVD); JPN: 43,000 (Blu-ray)
6	West 1st Dome Live 24-kara Kansha Todokemasu	ジャニーズWEST 1st ドーム LIVE ♡24(ニシ)から感謝 届けます♡	May 24	2017	Normal Edition (DVD)	ELOV-Label	1	RIAJ: Gold	JPN: 51,000 (DVD); JPN: 43,000 (Blu-ray)
6	West 1st Dome Live 24-kara Kansha Todokemasu	ジャニーズWEST 1st ドーム LIVE ♡24(ニシ)から感謝 届けます♡	May 24	2017	First Edition (Blu-ray)	ELOV-Label	2	RIAJ: Gold	JPN: 51,000 (DVD); JPN: 43,000 (Blu-ray)
6	West 1st Dome Live 24-kara Kansha Todokemasu	ジャニーズWEST 1st ドーム LIVE ♡24(ニシ)から感謝 届けます♡	May 24	2017	Normal Edition (Blu-ray)	ELOV-Label	2	RIAJ: Gold	JPN: 51,000 (DVD); JPN: 43,000 (Blu-ray)
7	West Live Tour 2017 Nawest	ジャニーズWEST LIVE TOUR 2017 なうぇすと	October 25	2017	First Edition (DVD)	ELOV-Label	2	RIAJ: Gold	JPN: 44,000 (DVD); JPN: 38,000 (Blu-ray)
7	West Live Tour 2017 Nawest	ジャニーズWEST LIVE TOUR 2017 なうぇすと	October 25	2017	Normal Edition (DVD)	ELOV-Label	2	RIAJ: Gold	JPN: 44,000 (DVD); JPN: 38,000 (Blu-ray)
7	West Live Tour 2017 Nawest	ジャニーズWEST LIVE TOUR 2017 なうぇすと	October 25	2017	First Edition (Blu-ray)	ELOV-Label	1	RIAJ: Gold	JPN: 44,000 (DVD); JPN: 38,000 (Blu-ray)
7	West Live Tour 2017 Nawest	ジャニーズWEST LIVE TOUR 2017 なうぇすと	October 25	2017	Normal Edition (Blu-ray)	ELOV-Label	1	RIAJ: Gold	JPN: 44,000 (DVD); JPN: 38,000 (Blu-ray)
8	West Live Tour 2018 WESTival	ジャニーズWEST LIVE TOUR 2018 WESTival	October 24	2018	First Edition (DVD)	ELOV-Label	2	RIAJ: Gold	JPN: — (DVD); JPN: 37,000 (Blu-ray)
8	West Live Tour 2018 WESTival	ジャニーズWEST LIVE TOUR 2018 WESTival	October 24	2018	Normal Edition (DVD)	ELOV-Label	2	RIAJ: Gold	JPN: — (DVD); JPN: 37,000 (Blu-ray)
8	West Live Tour 2018 WESTival	ジャニーズWEST LIVE TOUR 2018 WESTival	October 24	2018	First Edition (Blu-ray)	ELOV-Label	1	RIAJ: Gold	JPN: — (DVD); JPN: 37,000 (Blu-ray)
8	West Live Tour 2018 WESTival	ジャニーズWEST LIVE TOUR 2018 WESTival	October 24	2018	Normal Edition (Blu-ray)	ELOV-Label	1	RIAJ: Gold	JPN: — (DVD); JPN: 37,000 (Blu-ray)
9	West Live Tour 2019 WESTV!	ジャニーズWEST LIVE TOUR 2019 WESTV!	July 10	2019	First Edition (DVD)	ELOV-Label	1	RIAJ: Gold	JPN: 44,000 (DVD); JPN: 42,000 (Blu-ray)
9	West Live Tour 2019 WESTV!	ジャニーズWEST LIVE TOUR 2019 WESTV!	July 10	2019	Normal Edition (DVD)	ELOV-Label	1	RIAJ: Gold	JPN: 44,000 (DVD); JPN: 42,000 (Blu-ray)
9	West Live Tour 2019 WESTV!	ジャニーズWEST LIVE TOUR 2019 WESTV!	July 10	2019	First Edition (Blu-ray)	ELOV-Label	1	RIAJ: Gold	JPN: 44,000 (DVD); JPN: 42,000 (Blu-ray)
9	West Live Tour 2019 WESTV!	ジャニーズWEST LIVE TOUR 2019 WESTV!	July 10	2019	Normal Edition (Blu-ray)	ELOV-Label	1	RIAJ: Gold	JPN: 44,000 (DVD); JPN: 42,000 (Blu-ray)
10	West Live Tour 2020 W trouble	ジャニーズWEST LIVE TOUR 2020 W trouble	October 6	2021	First Edition (DVD)	ELOV-Label	1	RIAJ: Gold	JPN: 43,000 (DVD); JPN: 72,000 (Blu-ray)
10	West Live Tour 2020 W trouble	ジャニーズWEST LIVE TOUR 2020 W trouble	October 6	2021	Normal Edition (DVD)	ELOV-Label	1	RIAJ: Gold	JPN: 43,000 (DVD); JPN: 72,000 (Blu-ray)
10	West Live Tour 2020 W trouble	ジャニーズWEST LIVE TOUR 2020 W trouble	October 6	2021	First Edition (Blu-ray)	ELOV-Label	1	RIAJ: Gold	JPN: 43,000 (DVD); JPN: 72,000 (Blu-ray)
10	West Live Tour 2020 W trouble	ジャニーズWEST LIVE TOUR 2020 W trouble	October 6	2021	Normal Edition (Blu-ray)	ELOV-Label	1	RIAJ: Gold	JPN: 43,000 (DVD); JPN: 72,000 (Blu-ray)

== Media appearances ==
Listed only appearances as a group.

=== Movies ===
Undercover employee ~ let me be your spy (裏社員。-スパイやらせてもろてます‐, Ura shain - Spy yarasete morotemasu ‐), release on May 2, 2025, is the first movie of the group. Two rival companies' worker teams find themselves involved in the move to demolish a closed shopping street for the construction of a commercial complex. The film is a poignant action comedy with spy-like action and slapstick comedy, and a love story added to it. The film features the group's song Westside Soul (ウェッサイソウル, Uessai souru), written by Tortoise Matsumoto.

=== Variety shows ===
West was on Kanjani8 no Janiben (関ジャニ∞のジャニ勉) from May 2, 2007, to March 15, 2017. They had only appeared on VTRs, but from the broadcast on July 29, 2015, two members from West randomly appeared in the studio and were in charge of the segment of "3 Tack No.1."

Ikujani (育ジャニ) was broadcast on August 9, 2014, December 30, 2014, and November 10, 2015, on Mainichi Broadcasting System.

Little Tokyo Live ~Minna de Tsukuru Ippai Ippai Nama Housou~ (リトルトーキョーライブ〜みんなで作るいっぱいいっぱい生放送〜) was broadcast from October 8, 2014, to June 24, 2015, on TV Tokyo. West was in charge of MC with Hey! Say! JUMP on a weekly basis. The title was changed to "Little Tokyo Life" and was broadcast from July 1, 2015, to September 25, 2019.

Go! Go! WEST! Bōken Shitatte Eejanaika (GO！GO！WEST！冒険したってええじゃないか) is a series program on Kansai Telecasting Corporation in which West takes on challenges and adventures all over Japan. The first episode was held in Okinawa and broadcast on September 13, 2014. The second episode was held in Hokkaido and broadcast on March 22, 2015. The third episode was held in Shikoku and broadcast on February 12, 2017. The fourth episode was held in Kita Kantō and broadcast on September 17, 2017. The fifth episode was held in Kyushu and broadcast on August 18, 2019. The sixth episode was held in Shikoku again and broadcast on October 18, 2020. The seventh episode was held in Tōhoku and broadcast on January 29, 2022.

West was on the Doyoru series. Doyoru no Mōsōzoku (ドヨルの妄想族) was broadcast from July 11 to October 10, 2015, on Asahi Television Broadcasting System. Doyoru no Konamon Quest (ドヨルの粉モンクエスト) was broadcast from October 24, 2015, to January 9, 2016. Doyoru no Gotōchi Mon Quest (ドヨルのご当地モンクエスト) was broadcast from January 16 to March 26, 2016. Doyoru no Agent WEST! (ドヨルのエージェントWEST！) was broadcast from April 9 to September 24, 2016. The name was changed to Agent WEST (エージェントWEST), and it was broadcast from October 1, 2016, to June 28, 2020.

Naminori! Jenny (ナミノリ！ジェニー) was broadcast from October 22, 2016, to October 19, 2018, on Mainichi Broadcasting System.

Papajani WEST (パパジャニWEST) was streamed on Paravi from April 26, 2019, to April 10, 2020. It is started broadcasting on TBS Television (Japan) every Tuesday since June 30, 2020.

Johnny's WEST no Syusse Suru Hito Shinai Hito (ジャニーズWESTの出世する人・しない人) was broadcast on September 14, 2019, on Fuji TV.

Anata no Kawari ni Mitekimasu! Ria Totsu WEST (あなたの代わりに見てきます！リア突WEST) is started broadcasting from October 4, 2020, on Asahi Television Broadcasting System. It was broadcast every Saturday only in Kansai region until September 9, 2021. It is broadcasting every Sunday in every region in Japan.

West was invited to the shows LOVE it! (ラヴィット！) as a monthly guest from May 7 to 28, 2021.

=== TV dramas ===
Honō no Tenkōsei Reborn started broadcasting on Netflix on November 10, 2017.

=== Radio shows ===
Johnny's WEST no Otokomae wo Mezase! (ジャニーズWESTの男前を目指せ!) was broadcast from April 4, 2014, to September 24, 2021, on Asahi Radio Broadcasting Corporation.

Johnny's WEST Mogitate Kan Juice (ジャニーズWEST もぎたて関ジュース) is started broadcasting on April 7, 2007, on Radio Kansai.

bay Janaika (bayじゃないか) is started in April 2014, in Bay FM (Japan).

West no All Night Nippon Premium was broadcast on June 13, 2020, on Nippon Broadcasting System.

=== TV commercials ===
- Baskin-Robbins
  - Poppin Shower ☆ Pachikyan MAX (April, 2016)
  - Manatsu no Yukidaruma Daisakusen (July, 2016)
  - Challenge the Triple (June, 2017)
  - Manatsu no Yukidaruma Daisakusen (July, 2017)
- FamilyMart
  - Honō no Gourmet Fair (November, 2017)

== Tour / Concerts ==
Title	Japanese title	Date	Year	Prefecture	Venue	Notes
West Concert Debut Commemoration Naniwa Tomoare Honmani Arigatou!	ジャニーズWEST コンサート デビュー記念 なにわともあれ、ほんまにありがとう!	April 26 – May 6	2014	Osaka	Osaka Shochikuza	
West Concert Debut Commemoration Naniwa Tomoare Honmani Arigatou! in TOKYO	ジャニーズWEST コンサート デビュー記念 なにわともあれ、ほんまにありがとう! in TOKYO	May 11 – 21	2014	Tokyo	Shinbashi Enbujō	
West 1st Concert Ippatsumeeeeeee!	ジャニーズWEST 1stコンサート 一発めぇぇぇぇぇぇぇ!	January 2 – 3	2015	Kanagawa	Yokohama Arena	
West 1st Concert Ippatsumeeeeeee!	ジャニーズWEST 1stコンサート 一発めぇぇぇぇぇぇぇ!	January 5 – 6	2015	Osaka	Osaka Castle Hall	
West 1st Tour Paripipo	ジャニーズWEST 1st Tour パリピポ	May 4 – 6	2015	Kanagawa	Yokohama Arena	
West 1st Tour Paripipo	ジャニーズWEST 1st Tour パリピポ	May 8 – 9	2015	Aichi	Nagoya International Exhibition Hall, Century Hall	
West 1st Tour Paripipo	ジャニーズWEST 1st Tour パリピポ	May 13 – 14	2015	Osaka	Osaka Castle Hall	
West 1st Tour Paripipo	ジャニーズWEST 1st Tour パリピポ	May 28	2015	Hiroshima	Hiroshima City Cultural Exchange Hall	
West 1st Tour Paripipo	ジャニーズWEST 1st Tour パリピポ	June 1 – 2	2015	Fukuoka	Fukuoka Sunpalace	
West 1st Tour Paripipo	ジャニーズWEST 1st Tour パリピポ	June 6 – 7	2015	Hyōgo	Kobe World Memorial Hall	
West Concert Tour 2016 Luckyyyyyyy7	ジャニーズWEST CONCERT TOUR 2016 ラッキィィィィィィィ7	January 3 – 4	2016	Osaka	Osaka Castle Hall	
West Concert Tour 2016 Luckyyyyyyy7	ジャニーズWEST CONCERT TOUR 2016 ラッキィィィィィィィ7	January 6 – 7	2016	Kanagawa	Yokohama Arena	
West Concert Tour 2016 Luckyyyyyyy7	ジャニーズWEST CONCERT TOUR 2016 ラッキィィィィィィィ7	January 13 – 14	2016	Aichi	Nippon Gaishi Hall	
West Concert Tour 2016 Luckyyyyyyy7	ジャニーズWEST CONCERT TOUR 2016 ラッキィィィィィィィ7	January 17	2016	Hiroshima	Hiroshima Prefectural Sports Center	
West Concert Tour 2016 Luckyyyyyyy7	ジャニーズWEST CONCERT TOUR 2016 ラッキィィィィィィィ7	January 23 – 24	2016	Fukuoka	Fukuoka Convention Center	
West Concert Tour 2016 Luckyyyyyyy7	ジャニーズWEST CONCERT TOUR 2016 ラッキィィィィィィィ7	March 20	2016	Niigata	Toki Messe	
West Concert Tour 2016 Luckyyyyyyy7	ジャニーズWEST CONCERT TOUR 2016 ラッキィィィィィィィ7	March 24 – 25	2016	Osaka	Osaka Castle Hall	
West Concert Tour 2016 Luckyyyyyyy7	ジャニーズWEST CONCERT TOUR 2016 ラッキィィィィィィィ7	April 2 – 3	2016	Miyagi	Sekisui Heim Super Arena	
West 1st Dome Live 24-kara Kansha Todokemasu	ジャニーズWEST 1st ドーム LIVE ♡24(ニシ)から感謝 届けます♡	December 24 – 25	2016	Osaka	Kyocera Dome Osaka	Their first concert at domed stadium.
West Live Tour 2017 Nawest	ジャニーズWEST LIVE TOUR 2017 なうぇすと	January 3 – 7	2017	Kanagawa	Yokohama Arena	
West Live Tour 2017 Nawest	ジャニーズWEST LIVE TOUR 2017 なうぇすと	January 21 – 22	2017	Fukui	Sun Dome Fukui	
West Live Tour 2017 Nawest	ジャニーズWEST LIVE TOUR 2017 なうぇすと	January 28 – 29	2017	Fukuoka	Fukuoka Convention Center	
West Live Tour 2017 Nawest	ジャニーズWEST LIVE TOUR 2017 なうぇすと	February 4 – 5	2017	Miyagi	Sekisui Heim Super Arena	
West Live Tour 2017 Nawest	ジャニーズWEST LIVE TOUR 2017 なうぇすと	February 15 – 17	2017	Aichi	Nippon Gaishi Hall	
West Live Tour 2017 Nawest	ジャニーズWEST LIVE TOUR 2017 なうぇすと	March 18 – 29	2017	Shizuoka	Ecopa Arena	
West Live Tour 2017 Nawest	ジャニーズWEST LIVE TOUR 2017 なうぇすと	March 28 – 29	2017	Osaka	Osaka Castle Hall	
West Live Tour 2017 Nawest	ジャニーズWEST LIVE TOUR 2017 なうぇすと	April 9	2017	Hokkaido	Hokkaido Prefectural Sports Center	
West Live Tour 2017 Nawest	ジャニーズWEST LIVE TOUR 2017 なうぇすと	May 6 – 7	2017	Hiroshima	Hiroshima Prefectural Sports Center	
West Live Tour 2018 WESTival	ジャニーズWEST LIVE TOUR 2018 WESTival	January 3 – 6	2018	Kanagawa	Yokohama Arena	
West Live Tour 2018 WESTival	ジャニーズWEST LIVE TOUR 2018 WESTival	January 13 – 14	2018	Fukuoka	Fukuoka Convention Center	
West Live Tour 2018 WESTival	ジャニーズWEST LIVE TOUR 2018 WESTival	January 27 – 28	2018	Shizuoka	Ecopa Arena	
West Live Tour 2018 WESTival	ジャニーズWEST LIVE TOUR 2018 WESTival	January 30 – 31	2018	Aichi	Nippon Gaishi Hall	
West Live Tour 2018 WESTival	ジャニーズWEST LIVE TOUR 2018 WESTival	February 3 – 4	2018	Hyogo	Kobe World Memorial Hall	
West Live Tour 2018 WESTival	ジャニーズWEST LIVE TOUR 2018 WESTival	February 24 – 25	2018	Miyagi	Sekisui Heim Super Arena	
West Live Tour 2018 WESTival	ジャニーズWEST LIVE TOUR 2018 WESTival	March 17 – 18	2018	Niigata	Toki Messe	
West Live Tour 2018 WESTival	ジャニーズWEST LIVE TOUR 2018 WESTival	March 27 – 28	2018	Osaka	Osaka Castle Hall	
West Live Tour 2018 WESTival	ジャニーズWEST LIVE TOUR 2018 WESTival	April 7 – 8	2018	Hiroshima	Hiroshima Prefectural Sports Center	
West Live Tour 2018 WESTival	ジャニーズWEST LIVE TOUR 2018 WESTival	May 1 – 2	2018	Osaka	Osaka Castle Hall	
West Live Tour 2018 WESTival	ジャニーズWEST LIVE TOUR 2018 WESTival	May 19 – 20	2018	Hokkaido	Hokkaido Prefectural Sports Center	
West Live Tour 2019 WESTV!	ジャニーズWEST LIVE TOUR 2019 WESTV!	January 3 – 6	2019	Kanagawa	Yokohama Arena	
West Live Tour 2019 WESTV!	ジャニーズWEST LIVE TOUR 2019 WESTV!	January 8 – 9	2019	Aichi	Nippon Gaishi Hall	
West Live Tour 2019 WESTV!	ジャニーズWEST LIVE TOUR 2019 WESTV!	January 19 – 20	2019	Niigata	Toki Messe	
West Live Tour 2019 WESTV!	ジャニーズWEST LIVE TOUR 2019 WESTV!	January 26 – 27	2019	Fukuoka	Fukuoka Convention Center	
West Live Tour 2019 WESTV!	ジャニーズWEST LIVE TOUR 2019 WESTV!	February 9 – 10, 16 – 17	2019	Osaka	Osaka Castle Hall	
West Live Tour 2019 WESTV!	ジャニーズWEST LIVE TOUR 2019 WESTV!	February 23 – 24	2019	Miyagi	Sekisui Heim Super Arena	
West Live Tour 2019 WESTV!	ジャニーズWEST LIVE TOUR 2019 WESTV!	March 15 – 17	2019	Hyogo	Kobe World Memorial Hall	
West Live Tour 2019 WESTV!	ジャニーズWEST LIVE TOUR 2019 WESTV!	March 23 – 24	2019	Hokkaido	Hokkaido Prefectural Sports Center	
West Live Tour 2020 W trouble	ジャニーズWEST LIVE TOUR 2020 W trouble	~~March 29~~	2020	~~Fukuoka~~	~~Fukuoka Convention Center~~	Due to the COVID-19 pandemic, all 23 concerts scheduled to be held have been canceled. After that, the concerts were rescheduled. However, they were canceled again since Starto Entertainment announced that they would refrain from large-scale concerts until the end of 2020. The concerts were held online and were broadcast live from December 11 to 13.
West Live Tour 2020 W trouble	ジャニーズWEST LIVE TOUR 2020 W trouble	~~April 4 – 5~~	2020	~~Hokkaido~~	~~Makomanai Ice Arena~~	Due to the COVID-19 pandemic, all 23 concerts scheduled to be held have been canceled. After that, the concerts were rescheduled. However, they were canceled again since Starto Entertainment announced that they would refrain from large-scale concerts until the end of 2020. The concerts were held online and were broadcast live from December 11 to 13.
West Live Tour 2020 W trouble	ジャニーズWEST LIVE TOUR 2020 W trouble	~~April 11 – 12~~	2020	~~Miyagi~~	~~Sekisui Heim Super Arena~~	Due to the COVID-19 pandemic, all 23 concerts scheduled to be held have been canceled. After that, the concerts were rescheduled. However, they were canceled again since Starto Entertainment announced that they would refrain from large-scale concerts until the end of 2020. The concerts were held online and were broadcast live from December 11 to 13.
West Live Tour 2020 W trouble	ジャニーズWEST LIVE TOUR 2020 W trouble	~~April 27 – 29~~	2020	~~Niigata~~	~~Toki Messe~~	Due to the COVID-19 pandemic, all 23 concerts scheduled to be held have been canceled. After that, the concerts were rescheduled. However, they were canceled again since Starto Entertainment announced that they would refrain from large-scale concerts until the end of 2020. The concerts were held online and were broadcast live from December 11 to 13.
West Live Tour 2020 W trouble	ジャニーズWEST LIVE TOUR 2020 W trouble	~~May 4 – 6~~	2020	~~Osaka~~	~~Osaka Castle Hall~~	Due to the COVID-19 pandemic, all 23 concerts scheduled to be held have been canceled. After that, the concerts were rescheduled. However, they were canceled again since Starto Entertainment announced that they would refrain from large-scale concerts until the end of 2020. The concerts were held online and were broadcast live from December 11 to 13.
West Live Tour 2020 W trouble	ジャニーズWEST LIVE TOUR 2020 W trouble	~~May 16 – 17~~	2020	~~Saitama~~	~~Saitama Super Arena~~	Due to the COVID-19 pandemic, all 23 concerts scheduled to be held have been canceled. After that, the concerts were rescheduled. However, they were canceled again since Starto Entertainment announced that they would refrain from large-scale concerts until the end of 2020. The concerts were held online and were broadcast live from December 11 to 13.
West Live Tour 2020 W trouble	ジャニーズWEST LIVE TOUR 2020 W trouble	~~May 23 – 24~~	2020	~~Shizuoka~~	~~Ecopa Arena~~	Due to the COVID-19 pandemic, all 23 concerts scheduled to be held have been canceled. After that, the concerts were rescheduled. However, they were canceled again since Starto Entertainment announced that they would refrain from large-scale concerts until the end of 2020. The concerts were held online and were broadcast live from December 11 to 13.
West Live Tour 2020 W trouble	ジャニーズWEST LIVE TOUR 2020 W trouble	December 11 – 13	2020	–	Johnny's net Online	Due to the COVID-19 pandemic, all 23 concerts scheduled to be held have been canceled. After that, the concerts were rescheduled. However, they were canceled again since Starto Entertainment announced that they would refrain from large-scale concerts until the end of 2020. The concerts were held online and were broadcast live from December 11 to 13.
West Live Tour 2021 rainboW	ジャニーズWEST LIVE TOUR 2021 rainboW	April 3 – 4	2021	Hokkaido	Makomanai Ice Arena	A concert in Osaka was canceled due to quasi-emergency due to the COVID-19 pandemic. Although it was the first tour with audiences in two years, the capacity was limited to 5,000 people, and measures such as not performing an encore to end the concert at 8 pm.
West Live Tour 2021 rainboW	ジャニーズWEST LIVE TOUR 2021 rainboW	April 10 – 11	2021	Miyagi	Sekisui Heim Super Arena	A concert in Osaka was canceled due to quasi-emergency due to the COVID-19 pandemic. Although it was the first tour with audiences in two years, the capacity was limited to 5,000 people, and measures such as not performing an encore to end the concert at 8 pm.
West Live Tour 2021 rainboW	ジャニーズWEST LIVE TOUR 2021 rainboW	April 28 – 29	2021	Aichi	Nippon Gaishi Hall	A concert in Osaka was canceled due to quasi-emergency due to the COVID-19 pandemic. Although it was the first tour with audiences in two years, the capacity was limited to 5,000 people, and measures such as not performing an encore to end the concert at 8 pm.
West Live Tour 2021 rainboW	ジャニーズWEST LIVE TOUR 2021 rainboW	~~May 2 – 5~~	2021	~~Osaka~~	~~Osaka Castle Hall~~	A concert in Osaka was canceled due to quasi-emergency due to the COVID-19 pandemic. Although it was the first tour with audiences in two years, the capacity was limited to 5,000 people, and measures such as not performing an encore to end the concert at 8 pm.
West Live Tour 2021 rainboW	ジャニーズWEST LIVE TOUR 2021 rainboW	May 8 – 9	2021	Niigata	Toki Messe	A concert in Osaka was canceled due to quasi-emergency due to the COVID-19 pandemic. Although it was the first tour with audiences in two years, the capacity was limited to 5,000 people, and measures such as not performing an encore to end the concert at 8 pm.
West Live Tour 2021 rainboW	ジャニーズWEST LIVE TOUR 2021 rainboW	May 29 – 30	2021	Saitama	Saitama Super Arena	A concert in Osaka was canceled due to quasi-emergency due to the COVID-19 pandemic. Although it was the first tour with audiences in two years, the capacity was limited to 5,000 people, and measures such as not performing an encore to end the concert at 8 pm.
West Live Tour 2021 rainboW	ジャニーズWEST LIVE TOUR 2021 rainboW	June 19 – 20	2021	Kumamoto	Grand Messe Kumamoto	A concert in Osaka was canceled due to quasi-emergency due to the COVID-19 pandemic. Although it was the first tour with audiences in two years, the capacity was limited to 5,000 people, and measures such as not performing an encore to end the concert at 8 pm.
West Live Tour 2022 Mixed Juice	ジャニーズWEST LIVE TOUR 2022 Mixed Juice	March 20 – 21	2022	Shizuoka	Ecopa Arena	
West Live Tour 2022 Mixed Juice	ジャニーズWEST LIVE TOUR 2022 Mixed Juice	March 26 – 27	2022	Kumamoto	Grand Messe Kumamoto	
West Live Tour 2022 Mixed Juice	ジャニーズWEST LIVE TOUR 2022 Mixed Juice	April 1 – 3	2022	Miyagi	Sekisui Heim Super Arena	
West Live Tour 2022 Mixed Juice	ジャニーズWEST LIVE TOUR 2022 Mixed Juice	April 9 – 10	2022	Aichi	Nippon Gaishi Hall	
West Live Tour 2022 Mixed Juice	ジャニーズWEST LIVE TOUR 2022 Mixed Juice	April 15 – 17	2022	Osaka	Osaka Municipal Central Gymnasium	
West Live Tour 2022 Mixed Juice	ジャニーズWEST LIVE TOUR 2022 Mixed Juice	April 27 – May 1	2022	Kanagawa	Pia Arena MM	
West Live Tour 2022 Mixed Juice	ジャニーズWEST LIVE TOUR 2022 Mixed Juice	May 4 – 5	2022	Osaka	Osaka Castle Hall	
West Live Tour 2022 Mixed Juice	ジャニーズWEST LIVE TOUR 2022 Mixed Juice	May 15 – 16	2022	Niigata	Toki Messe	
West Live Tour 2022 Mixed Juice	ジャニーズWEST LIVE TOUR 2022 Mixed Juice	June 10 – 12	2022	Hokkaido	Makomanai Ice Arena	
