= Bon Bon Voyage =

- Regular edition

Studio album by Naniwa Danshi
- Released: July 2, 2025
- Genre: J-pop
- Length: 53:01 (First limited edition 1); 65:10 (First limited edition 2); 60:56 (Regular edition)
- Label: Storm Labels

Naniwa Danshi chronology
+Alpha (2024)	Bon Bon Voyage (2025)	ND^{5} (2026)

Singles from Bon Bon Voyage
- 1. "Koisuru Hikari" Released: August 28, 2024; 2. "Arigatō Kokoro kara/Yūki 100% (Digital single)" Released: November 22, 2024; 3. "Doki it" Released: February 26, 2025; 4. "Gira Gira Summer (Digital single)" Released: June 1, 2025

Music video
- "Over The Horizon! [Official Teaser]" on YouTube "Giragira Summer" on YouTube "Yūki 100% [Anime Collaboration Movie]" on YouTube

Bon Bon Voyage is the fourth studio album by Japanese boy band Naniwa Danshi. It was released on July 2, 2025.

The album is themed around "travel and adventure" and includes 14 tracks, featuring previously released singles such as “Koisuru Hikari” and “Doki it”, as well as digital releases “Yūki 100%” and “Arigatō Kokoro kara”.

The album also features new songs such as “Over The Horizon!” and the summer-themed track “Giragira Summer”, which was used in a commercial for Round One.

== Background and release ==
Bon Bon Voyage was released approximately one year after the group's previous album +Alpha. The album was produced with the concept of "travel and adventure", incorporating songs that express excitement, anticipation, and emotional journeys.

The album contains 14 tracks, including the singles “Koisuru Hikari” and “Doki it”, as well as previously released digital songs such as “Yūki 100%” and “Arigatō Kokoro kara”. New songs include “Over The Horizon!”, which depicts the beginning of a journey, and “Giragira Summer”, a bright summer song used in a Round One commercial.

The album was released in three formats: limited edition 1, limited edition 2, and a regular edition. Limited edition 1 includes music videos and making-of footage for “Over The Horizon!” and “Giragira Summer”, while limited edition 2 includes three unit songs along with their music videos and behind-the-scenes footage. The regular edition includes additional bonus tracks.

In support of the album, the group also announced the nationwide arena tour “Naniwa Danshi LIVE TOUR 2025 'BON BON VOYAGE'”, which consists of 43 performances across nine cities.

== Chart performance ==
Bon Bon Voyage debuted at number one on the Oricon Weekly Albums Chart, marking Naniwa Danshi's fourth consecutive number-one album since their debut. It also topped the Oricon Weekly Combined Albums Chart.

On Billboard Japan, the album debuted at number one on both the Top Albums Sales chart and the Hot Albums chart. It additionally charted within the top 10 of the Top Download Albums chart.

The album ranked number two on the Oricon Monthly Albums Chart for July 2025 and number 13 on the Oricon Yearly Albums Ranking for 2025. On Billboard Japan's year-end chart, it ranked number 15 on the Top Albums Sales chart.

== Track listing ==
=== CD ===
==== Limited edition 1 / Regular edition ====
1. "The Greatest Voyage" – 3:28
2. "Over The Horizon!" – 3:37
3. "Giragira Summer" – 3:27
  - Used as a commercial song for Round One. It was pre-released digitally on June 1, 2025, and its music video premiered on YouTube the same day. The song debuted at number four on the Oricon Weekly Digital Singles Chart with 4,154 downloads in its first week.
4. "Doki it" – 3:39
  - The group's eighth single and used in AOKI's "Freshers Fair" commercial campaign.
5. "Thrill Drive" – 3:16
6. "Circus Night" – 3:56
7. "Oborete Ai" – 3:36
8. "Moshimo" – 4:00
9. "Yuuwaku Dance" – 3:37
10. "Because I Just Love You" – 4:11
11. "Koisuru Hikari" – 4:14
  - The group's seventh single and served as the theme song for the film Koi o Shiranai Bokutachi wa.
12. "H.E.L.L.O" – 4:18
13. "Arigatō Kokoro kara" – 3:51
  - Written as the theme song for the film Nintama Rantarō the Movie: Dokutake Ninja-tai Saikyō no Gunshi. It was released digitally on November 22, 2024, together with "Yūki 100%", and debuted at number three on the Oricon Weekly Digital Singles Chart with 11,810 downloads.
14. "Yūki 100%" – 3:54
  - Theme song for the same film. Originally performed by senior artists and covered by multiple groups over more than 30 years. It debuted at number two on the Oricon Weekly Digital Singles Chart with 12,951 downloads.

==== Limited edition 2 bonus tracks ====
1. "Devil or Angel" – 3:51 (Shunsuke Michieda, Kyohei Takahashi)
2. "Toystyle" – 3:33 (Ryusei Onishi, Kento Nagao)
3. "Adulty" – 4:45 (Daigo Nishihata, Joichiro Fujiwara, Kazuya Ohashi)

==== Regular edition bonus tracks ====
1. "Bon Bon Voyage" – 3:59
2. "Seven Seas" – 3:56
