= +Alpha =

2024 studio album by Naniwa Danshi

- Regular edition

Studio album by Naniwa Danshi
- Released: June 12, 2024
- Genre: J-pop
- Length: 58:20 (Regular edition)
- Label: Storm Labels

Naniwa Danshi chronology
Popmall (2023)	+Alpha (2024)	Bon Bon Voyage (2025)

Singles from +Alpha
- 1. "Make Up Day / Missing" Released: September 13, 2023; 2. "I Wish" Released: November 15, 2023

Music video
- "Alpha" on YouTube "New Classic" on YouTube

+Alpha (read as "Plus Alpha") is the third studio album by Japanese idol group Naniwa Danshi. It was released on June 12, 2024. The album includes 14 tracks across all editions, featuring previously released singles such as "Make Up Day", "Missing", and "I Wish", as well as the commercial tie-in song "New Classic".

== Background and release ==
The album was released in three formats: two limited editions (CD+Blu-ray/DVD) and a regular edition. The title +Alpha was proposed by member Shunsuke Michieda and reflects the group's intention to expand their musical range by incorporating a wider variety of styles, including more emotional and intense songs alongside their established pop sound.

The album contains a total of 14 tracks common to all editions, including the singles "Make Up Day", "Missing", and "I Wish", as well as "New Classic", which was used in a commercial campaign for AOKI. In addition, each edition includes different bonus tracks. Limited Edition 2 features the group's first unit songs, divided into three member combinations, while Limited Edition 1 includes music videos and behind-the-scenes footage for "Alpha" and "New Classic". The regular edition includes additional bonus tracks such as "Chuki Chuki Honeymoon" and "Tokyo AM1:00".

The lead track "Alpha" was released with a full music video on the group's official YouTube channel more than a month prior to the album's release, surpassing 6 million views by early July 2024. The song has been described as embodying the group's signature "bright" and "pop" style while also demonstrating their evolving performance capabilities. In particular, the group's ability to balance "freshness" with their established identity has been highlighted, supported by the expressive performance styles of members such as Daigo Nishihata and Shunsuke Michieda.

On April 24, 2024, the group announced their arena tour "Naniwa Danshi LIVE TOUR 2024 '+Alpha'" via an Instagram livestream. The tour ran from June 28 to October 6, 2024, across nine cities in Japan, totaling 42 performances.

On August 13, 2024, it was announced during a live performance at Yokohama Arena that a digital version titled +Alpha (Special Edition), including all bonus tracks, would be released on streaming platforms.

== Chart performance ==
+Alpha debuted at number one on the Oricon Weekly Albums Chart, marking Naniwa Danshi's third consecutive number-one album since their debut. It also topped the Oricon Combined Albums Chart in the same week. The album ranked first on the Oricon Monthly Albums Chart for June 2024 and was later ranked seventh on the Oricon Year-end Albums Chart for 2024.

On Billboard Japan, the album also achieved strong commercial success. It debuted at number one on the Top Albums Sales chart with over 360,000 copies sold in its first week. It further topped the Billboard Japan Hot Albums chart, and later ranked seventh on the year-end Top Albums Sales chart and tenth on the year-end Hot Albums chart for 2024.

The album also reached number three on the Billboard Japan Download Albums chart upon its digital release.

== Track listing ==
=== CD ===
==== Standard tracks ====
1. "New Classic" – 3:04
  - "New Classic" is inspired by Antonio Vivaldi's The Four Seasons ("Spring") and was used as a commercial song for AOKI.
2. "Kick Start" – 3:27
3. "Alpha" – 3:40
  - "Alpha" serves as the lead track of the album and showcases the group's signature bright and pop-oriented style.
4. "Namonaki Tabibito" – 3:51
5. "Yūniji" – 3:38
6. "Snap!" – 3:03
7. "Make Up Day" – 3:07
  - "Make Up Day" and "Missing" were released as a double A-side single and used as theme songs for television dramas.
8. "Arifureta Koi ja, Mō Mitasarenai" – 4:12
9. "Satisfaction" – 3:04
10. "Missing" – 3:30
11. "Girlfriend" – 3:18
12. "I Wish" – 4:17
  - "I Wish" was used as the theme song for the TBS drama My Second Aoharu.
13. "So Good" – 3:57
14. "Live in the moment" – 3:42
  - "Live in the moment" samples Ludwig van Beethoven's Symphony No. 9 ("Ode to Joy").

==== Limited edition 1 ====
1. "Happy Happy Birthday!!" – 3:00

==== Limited edition 2 ====
1. "Koi Yakedome" (Daigo Nishihata, Ryusei Onishi) – 3:50
2. "Precious One" (Shunsuke Michieda, Joichiro Fujiwara) – 4:33
3. "Ururirurarirari" (Kyohei Takahashi, Kento Nagao, Kazuya Ohashi) – 3:17

==== Regular edition ====
1. "Chukichuki Honeymoon" – 4:42
2. "Tokyo AM1:00" – 3:41

=== Blu-ray/DVD ===
==== Limited edition 1 ====
1. "Alpha" Music Video & Making
2. "Alpha" Music Video (Dance ver.)
3. "NEW CLASSIC" Music Video & Making

==== Limited edition 2 ====
1. "Koi Yakedome" Music Video
2. "Precious One" Music Video
3. "Ururirurarirari" Music Video
4. Unit making-of video
