= Make Up Day / Missing =

2023 single by Naniwa Danshi

- Regular Edition

Single by Naniwa Danshi

from the album +Alpha
- A-side: "Make Up Day"; "Missing"
- B-side: "Diary"; "Umbrella"; "Refrain"; "Wonder"
- Released: September 13, 2023
- Genre: J-pop
- Length: 3:08 (Make Up Day); 3:30 (Missing)
- Label: J Storm

Naniwa Danshi singles chronology
"Special Kiss" (2023)	"Make Up Day / Missing" (2023)	"I Wish" (2023)

Music video
- "Make Up Day" on YouTube "Missing" on YouTube

"Make Up Day" / "Missing" is the fifth single by Japanese boy band Naniwa Danshi. It was released on September 13, 2023, by J Storm.

== Overview ==
The single was released in three editions: Limited Edition 1 (DVD/Blu-ray), Limited Edition 2 (DVD/Blu-ray), and a regular edition.

"Make Up Day" was used as the theme song for the Nippon TV drama Benisasu Life, starring Ryusei Onishi. A promotional video featuring the song was first released on the drama's official YouTube channel on June 27, 2023. The song is described as a catchy and stylish dance track, evoking colorful imagery that adds vibrancy to everyday life, with lyrics themed around makeup to match the concept of the drama.

"Missing" was used as the theme song for the TV Asahi drama Knockin' on Locked Door, starring Daigo Nishihata and Hokuto Matsumura. The two artists appeared in a collaborative social media campaign ahead of the broadcast, where both "CREAK" by SixTones and "Missing" were revealed as the drama's theme songs. The song is described as a jazz-influenced mid-tempo track, incorporating lyrics that reflect the emotions and character of Himu, portrayed by Nishihata, presenting a new musical aspect of the group.

== Commercial performance ==
"Make Up Day / Missing" debuted at number one on the Oricon Weekly Singles Chart, marking the group's fifth consecutive number-one single.

The single also topped the Oricon Weekly Combined Singles Chart.

On Billboard Japan, it debuted at number one on the Top Singles Sales chart with approximately 390,000 copies sold in its first week, while reaching number five on the Japan Hot 100 chart.

It also ranked third on the Oricon Monthly Singles Chart for September 2023.

== Track listing ==
=== Limited edition 1 ===
1. "Make Up Day" – 3:08
  - Lyrics by Kenichi Sakamuro
  - Music by Kenichi Sakamuro, Kota Sahara
  - Arranged by Masaya Suzuki
  - Theme song for the Nippon TV drama Benisasu Life starring Ryusei Onishi
2. "Missing" – 3:30
  - Lyrics by YU-G
  - Music by h-wonder, YU-G
  - Arranged by h-wonder
  - Theme song for the TV Asahi drama Knockin' on Locked Door starring Hokuto Matsumura and Daigo Nishihata
3. "Diary" – 4:24
  - Lyrics by Sayaka Inoue, Ryota Fukuoka
  - Music by tasuku, Ryota Fukuoka, Sayaka Inoue, Shun
4. "Diary (Instrumental)" – 4:18

=== Limited edition 2 ===
1. "Missing" – 3:30
2. "Make Up Day" – 3:08
3. "Umbrella" – 3:11
  - Lyrics by Yuki Tamatani
  - Music by Karrinator, Kazunari Okada, Yuki Tamatani
4. "Umbrella (Instrumental)" – 3:07

=== Regular edition ===
1. "Make Up Day" – 3:08
2. "Missing" – 3:30
3. "Refrain" – 3:19
  - Lyrics and music by Atsushi Shimada, Shun Kusakawa
4. "Wonder" – 3:10
  - Lyrics by Akira Kurihara (Jazzin'park)
  - Music by Shingo Kubota (Jazzin'park), Akira Kurihara (Jazzin'park)
5. "Make Up Day (Instrumental)" – 3:08
6. "Missing (Instrumental)" – 3:30
7. "Refrain (Instrumental)" – 3:19
8. "Wonder (Instrumental)" – 3:06

== DVD/Blu-ray ==
=== Limited edition 1 ===
1. "Make Up Day" (Music Video & Making)
2. "Make Up Day" (Dance version)
3. "Make Up Day" (Group Shot version)

=== Limited edition 2 ===
1. "Missing" (Music Video & Making)
2. "Missing" (Lip Sync version)
