= Asymmetry / Black Nightmare =

2025 single by Naniwa Danshi

- Limited edition "Asymmetry" version

Single by Naniwa Danshi

from the album ND5
- B-side: "One-Room Christmas"; "Izayoi Moon"; "Hirahira × Tokimeki"; "Things That Never Change"
- Released: September 3, 2025
- Genre: J-pop
- Length: 4:05 ("Asymmetry"); 3:08 ("Black Nightmare")
- Label: Storm Labels

Naniwa Danshi singles chronology
"Doki it" (2025)	"Asymmetry / Black Nightmare" (2025)	"Hard Work" (2026)

Music video
- "Asymmetry" on YouTube "Black Nightmare" on YouTube

"Asymmetry" / "Black Nightmare" (アシンメトリー / Black Nightmare) is the ninth single by Japanese boy band Naniwa Danshi. It was released on September 3, 2025, through Storm Labels.

The single is a double A-side release featuring the title tracks "Asymmetry" and "Black Nightmare". Digital distribution via streaming and download platforms began on September 10, 2025.

== Background and release ==
The release of the single was announced on July 20, 2025, during the Niigata performance of the group's concert tour Naniwa Danshi LIVE TOUR 2025 "Bon Bon Voyage".

"Asymmetry" serves as the theme song for the TV Asahi drama Revenge Spy, starring group member Kazuya Ohashi. The song is a mysterious and thrilling dance number that reflects the drama's central theme of duality, portraying a story of "unrequited love" within its narrative. A long version of the track was first unveiled during the broadcast of the drama's first episode on July 2, 2025.

"Black Nightmare" is the theme song for the Kansai TV and FOD drama Laundering, starring Joichiro Fujiwara. The track was written specifically for the series and features an addictive electro dance sound with elements of hip hop and rap. Its hard-boiled atmosphere and edgy lyrics highlight a darker side of the group. The song was first revealed in a promotional video for the drama released on June 22, 2025.

According to Joichiro Fujiwara, the recording process for "Black Nightmare" was particularly challenging and took longer than other songs recorded around the same period for the group's album Bon Bon Voyage.

== Chart performance ==
The single debuted at number one on the Oricon Weekly Singles Chart, marking the group's ninth consecutive number-one single since their debut. It also topped the Oricon Weekly Combined Singles Chart.

On Billboard Japan, the single reached number one on the Top Singles Sales chart, selling approximately 358,000 copies in its first week.

Among the individual tracks, "Asymmetry" peaked at number one on the Billboard Japan Hot 100, while also reaching number 10 on the Oricon Weekly Digital Singles (individual track) chart and number 8 on the Billboard Japan Download Songs chart.

"Black Nightmare" reached number 21 on the Oricon Weekly Digital Singles (individual track) chart and number 19 on the Billboard Japan Download Songs chart.

== Track listing ==
Credits adapted from official sources.

=== CD ===
==== Limited edition "Asymmetry" version ====
1. "Asymmetry" – 4:05
  - Lyrics: Keiya-amazuti
  - Composition: Keiya-amazuti, Shingo Kubota (Jazzin'park)
  - Arrangement: Shingo Kubota (Jazzin'park)
2. "Black Nightmare" – 3:08
  - Lyrics: her0ism, TSINGTAO
  - Composition: her0ism, Peyote Beats, TSINGTAO
  - Arrangement: Taku Yoshioka
3. "One-Room Christmas" – 3:25
  - Lyrics: Junji Ishiwatari
  - Composition: Erik Lidbom
  - Arrangement: Hiroshi Sasaki

==== Limited edition "Black Nightmare" version ====
1. "Black Nightmare" – 3:08
2. "Asymmetry" – 4:05
3. "Izayoi Moon" – 3:13
  - Lyrics: Kazunari Okada
  - Composition and arrangement: HIKARI

==== Regular edition / Famikura Store Online limited "Naniwan Dark-n" version ====
1. "Asymmetry" – 4:05
2. "Black Nightmare" – 3:08
3. "Hirahira × Tokimeki" – 3:09
  - Lyrics: Kazunari Okada
  - Composition: Hwang Hyun (MonoTree)
  - Arrangement: Tomoki Ishizuka
4. "Things That Never Change" – 4:34
  - Lyrics: katsuki.CF (Relic Lyric inc.)
  - Composition: tasuku, Ryota Fukuoka, katsuki.CF
  - Arrangement: tasuku
5. "Asymmetry" (instrumental) – 4:05
6. "Black Nightmare" (instrumental) – 3:08
7. "Hirahira × Tokimeki" (instrumental) – 3:09
8. "Things That Never Change" (instrumental) – 4:30

=== DVD/Blu-ray ===
==== Limited edition "Asymmetry" version ====
- "Asymmetry" (music video)
- "Asymmetry" (making of music video)
- "Asymmetry" (dance shot version)

==== Limited edition "Black Nightmare" version ====
- "Black Nightmare" (music video)
- "Black Nightmare" (making of music video)
- "Asymmetry / Black Nightmare" (choreography)
