= Koisuru Hikari =

2024 single by Naniwa Danshi

- Limited edition 1

Single by Naniwa Danshi

from the album Bon Bon Voyage
- A-side: "Koisuru Hikari"
- B-side: "Kimi to Kaze to"; "cardigan"; "daydream"; "change"; "epilogue"
- Released: August 28, 2024
- Genre: J-pop
- Length: 4:14
- Label: Storm Labels

Naniwa Danshi singles chronology
"I Wish" (2023)	"Koisuru Hikari" (2024)	"Doki it" (2025)

Music video
- "Koisuru Hikari" on YouTube "Koisuru Hikari" – Live Performance on YouTube

"Koisuru Hikari" (Japanese: コイスルヒカリ) is the seventh single by Japanese boy band Naniwa Danshi, released on August 28, 2024, by Storm Labels.

The single was also made available for digital download and streaming on the same day.

== Background and release ==
"Koisuru Hikari" was released approximately nine and a half months after the group's previous single "I Wish". The single was issued in three editions: a limited edition Type 1 (CD+DVD/Blu-ray), a limited edition Type 2 (CD+DVD/Blu-ray), and a regular edition (CD only).

The title track serves as the theme song for the film Koi o Shiranai Bokutachi wa, starring group member Ryusei Onishi, which was released nationwide on August 23, 2024. The song is described as a refreshing rock-influenced love song that emphasizes themes of youth and the frustration of being unable to fully express one’s feelings. Onishi commented that the song is “a warm track that gently encourages listeners,” reflecting elements of the film’s narrative.

On June 27, 2024, the song was made available on TikTok, where the members posted videos featuring the "#コイスルダンス" ("Koisuru Dance"). The music video premiered on YouTube on July 22. The song was first performed live during a livestream from the Yokohama Arena concert of their tour Naniwa Danshi LIVE TOUR 2024 '+Alpha' on August 13.

The group gave the song its first television performance on TV Asahi's Music Station on August 30, where member Shunsuke Michieda highlighted the choreography, noting that the hand movements resemble scrolling on a smartphone and are easy to imitate.

== Chart performance ==
"Koisuru Hikari" debuted at number one on the Oricon Weekly Singles Chart, marking Naniwa Danshi's seventh consecutive and overall seventh number-one single. The single also topped the Oricon Weekly Combined Singles Chart.

It ranked second on the Oricon Monthly Singles Chart for August 2024 and placed 22nd on the Oricon Yearly Singles Chart for 2024.

On Billboard Japan, the single debuted at number one on the Top Singles Sales chart with 432,000 copies sold in its first week. It also peaked at number two on the Billboard Japan Hot 100 and number five on the Download Songs chart. The single ranked 26th on the Billboard Japan Top Singles Sales year-end chart for 2024.

== Track listing ==
=== Limited edition 1 ===
1. "Koisuru Hikari" (コイスルヒカリ) – 4:14
  - Lyrics: Kazunari Okada
  - Music: Kazunari Okada, Takeo Kajiwara
  - Arrangement: Hiroshi Sasaki
2. "Kimi to Kaze to" (君と風と) – 3:23
  - Lyrics: Masami Kakinuma, KIKUE
  - Music: Josef Melin
  - Arrangement: Josef Melin
3. "Cardigan" – 3:40
  - Lyrics: Kazunari Okada
  - Music: Ryota Saito, Sota Saito
  - Arrangement: Naoki Endo
4. "Cardigan" (instrumental) – 3:36

=== Limited edition 2 ===
1. "Koisuru Hikari" – 4:14
2. "Kimi to Kaze to" – 3:23
3. "Daydream" – 4:38
  - Lyrics: Kazunari Okada, RT2
  - Music: Kazunari Okada, Tansho Sora, Hikaru Kabe
  - Arrangement: Tansho Sora, Hikaru Kabe
  - Strings arrangement: Hiroshi Sasaki
4. "Daydream" (instrumental) – 4:34

=== Regular edition ===
1. "Koisuru Hikari" – 4:14
2. "Kimi to Kaze to" – 3:23
3. "Change" – 4:29
  - Lyrics: Susumu Kawaguchi, Kenichi Sakamuro
  - Music: Susumu Kawaguchi, Kenichi Sakamuro
  - Arrangement: Susumu Kawaguchi
4. "Epilogue" – 3:07
  - Lyrics: Kazunari Okada
  - Music: youth case
  - Arrangement: ha-j
5. "Koisuru Hikari" (instrumental) – 4:14
6. "Kimi to Kaze to" (instrumental) – 3:22
7. "Change" (instrumental) – 4:28
8. "Epilogue" (instrumental) – 3:03

=== DVD/Blu-ray ===
==== Limited edition Type 1 ====
- "Koisuru Hikari" (Music Video and making footage)
- "Koisuru Hikari" (Dance version)

==== Limited edition Type 2 ====
- "-728 Room- Studio Live" ("Kimi to Kaze to" / "Yūniji" (夕虹) / "Koisuru Hikari")
