= The Good Father (2022 film) =

- Theatrical release poster
- Kanji: この子は邪悪
- Revised Hepburn: Kono Ko wa Jaaku
- Directed by: Shō Kataoka
- Written by: Shō Kataoka
- Produced by: Daisuke Toyama; Erika Murayama; Satoshi Hashidate
- Starring: Sara Minami; Ryūsei Ōnishi (Naniwa Danshi); Yuki Sakurai; Sakura Watanabe; Rina Sakuragi; Miyoko Inagawa; Ryutaro Ninomiya; Hiroshi Tamaki
- Cinematography: Yasushi Hanamura
- Music by: Takuma Watanabe
- Production companies: Culture Entertainment; Happinet Phantom Studios; C&I Entertainment; TC Entertainment
- Distributed by: Happinet Phantom
- Release date: 1 September 2022 (Japan)
- Running time: 100 minutes
- Country: Japan
- Language: Japanese

The Good Father (Japanese: この子は邪悪, romanized: Kono Ko wa Jaaku) is a 2022 Japanese suspense horror film directed and written by Shō Kataoka and starring Sara Minami.

== Plot ==
Five years ago, the psychotherapist Shiro Kubo (Hiroshi Tamaki) and his family ended up in a car accident. Her wife Mayuko is in the hospital in a vegetative state, and her younger daughter Luna suffered burns and now spends her time at home and wears masks that cover her whole face. Kubo himself now walks with a limp. His older daughter Hana (Sara Minami) was miraculously unhurt, but suffers from a trauma and has stopped going to school.

Hana befriends Jun (Ryūsei Ōnishi), a local high school boy who's the same age as her. Jun is investigating a strange phenomenon where various people in the city have seemed to lost their humanity and ability to walk and speak; his own mother has also been a victim. Jun starts to suspect that Hana's father might have something to do with the phenomenon.

One day, Hana's father brings home a woman (Yuki Sakurai) who he says is their mother, who has miraculously woken up from her coma. However, Hana can't seem to shake the feeling that something is off, and that the woman looks completely different than the mother she remembers.

== Cast ==
- Hana Kubo: Sara Minami
- Jun Yotsui: Ryūsei Ōnishi (Naniwa Danshi)
- Mayuko Kubo: Yuki Sakurai
- Luna Kubo: Sakura Watanabe
- Mayuko Kubo: Rina Sakuragi
- Jun's Grandmother: Miyoko Inagawa
- Yūichi Samegawa: Ryutaro Ninomiya
- Mari Suzue: Qyoko Kudo
- Shiro Kubo: Hiroshi Tamaki

== Awards ==
- Fantasporto 2022: Special Mention of the Fantasy Jury
