= I Wish (Naniwa Danshi song) =

2023 single by Naniwa Danshi

- Regular Edition

Single by Naniwa Danshi

from the album +Alpha
- A-side: "I Wish"
- B-side: "Join us !"; "Tadaima"; "Have a blast"; "Snowy Love"; "F.L.E.X."
- Released: November 15, 2023
- Genre: J-pop
- Length: 4:17
- Label: J Storm

Naniwa Danshi singles chronology
| "Make Up Day / Missing" (2023) | "I Wish" (2023) | "Koisuru Hikari" (2024) |

Music video
- "I Wish" on YouTube "Join us !" on YouTube

"I Wish" is the sixth single by Japanese boy band Naniwa Danshi, released on November 15, 2023, by J Storm. The title track was used as the theme song for the TBS drama series My Second Aoharu, starring member Shunsuke Michieda.

== Background and release ==
The single was released in three editions: a limited edition A (CD+Blu-ray/DVD), a limited edition B (CD+Blu-ray/DVD), and a regular CD-only edition.

The title track "I Wish" was used as the theme song for the TBS Tuesday drama series My Second Aoharu, starring member Shunsuke Michieda. It was the group's first theme song for a drama broadcast by TBS. The song was written to reflect the themes of "second youth" portrayed in the series, following discussions with the production team.

Musically, "I Wish" begins with a keyboard arrangement and develops with strings, drums, bass, and organ, incorporating a seasonal, winter-inspired sound. Joichiro Fujiwara described it as "a Christmas song that represents Naniwa Danshi".

A recording video was released on October 4, 2023, followed by the music video on October 16. Behind-the-scenes footage was also shared on the group's official Instagram account.

On November 12, 2023, the group held a livestream on their official YouTube channel to celebrate the second anniversary of their CD debut, during which they performed "I Wish" for the first time.

== Chart performance ==
"I Wish" debuted at number one on the Oricon Weekly Singles Chart dated November 27, 2023, with 370,000 copies sold in its first week. This marked the group's sixth consecutive number-one single and their sixth overall. The single also topped the Oricon Weekly Combined Singles Chart on the same date, becoming their sixth number-one entry on that chart as well. It additionally ranked number one on the Oricon Monthly Singles Chart for November 2023.

On Billboard Japan, "I Wish" reached number one on the Top Singles Sales chart, and peaked at number two on the Japan Hot 100 chart.

== Track listing ==
=== Limited edition A ===
1. "I Wish" – 4:17
2. "Join us !" – 3:56
3. "Tadaima" (ただいま/I'm Home) – 3:50
4. "Tadaima" (Instrumental)

=== Limited edition B ===
1. "I Wish" – 4:17
2. "Join us !" – 3:56
3. "Have a blast" – 3:56
4. "Have a blast" (Instrumental)

=== Regular edition ===
1. "I Wish" – 4:17
2. "Join us !" – 3:56
3. "Snowy Love" – 4:20
4. "F.L.E.X." – 3:23
5. "I Wish" (Instrumental)
6. "Join us !" (Instrumental)
7. "Snowy Love" (Instrumental)
8. "F.L.E.X." (Instrumental)

=== DVD / Blu-ray ===
Limited edition A

1. "I Wish" (Music Video & Making)
2. "I Wish" (Jacket Shooting & Recording Behind)

Limited edition B

1. "Join us !" (Music Video & Making)
