= Hard Work (song) =

2026 single by Naniwa Danshi

- Regular edition

Single by Naniwa Danshi

from the album ND5
- B-side: "Never Romantic"; "Kimi Tōhikō"; "Mada Haru no Mama"; "Sukisugi"; "Shekimaha"
- Released: February 18, 2026
- Genre: J-pop
- Length: 3:42
- Label: Storm Labels

Naniwa Danshi singles chronology
"Asymmetry / Black Nightmare" (2025)	"Hard Work" (2026)

Music video
- "Hard Work" on YouTube "Never Romantic" on YouTube

"Hard Work" is the tenth single by Japanese boy band Naniwa Danshi. It was released on February 18, 2026, through Storm Labels.

== Background and release ==
The single marks the first release of the group's fifth anniversary year. It was issued in multiple formats, including limited editions, a regular edition, a special-priced limited edition, and several store-exclusive versions.

The title track "Hard Work" was used as the theme song for the television drama Yokohama Neighbors Season 1, starring Ryusei Onishi and Yoshitaka Hara.

Musically, "Hard Work" is an upbeat, swing rock–influenced anthem that begins with a group rap section and features an energetic arrangement. Lyrically, the song conveys themes of love, courage, and perseverance, delivering a message of unity and self-affirmation.

The accompanying music video features synchronized choreography and a rebellious visual concept highlighting the bond between the members.

The single debuted at number one on the Oricon Daily Singles Chart, selling approximately 550,000 copies on its first day.

The B-side "Never Romantic" was previously released as a digital single on December 8, 2025, and served as a theme song for the film Romantic Killer.

== Chart performance ==
"Hard Work" debuted at number one on the Oricon Weekly Singles Chart, marking Naniwa Danshi's tenth consecutive number-one single since their debut.

The single also topped the Billboard Japan Top Singles Sales chart, selling approximately 737,000 copies.

The B-side "Never Romantic", which had been released digitally in December 2025, reached number one on the Oricon Weekly Digital Singles Chart and number one on the Billboard Japan Download Songs chart.

It additionally peaked at number five on the Billboard Japan Hot 100 and number two on the Hot Shot Songs chart, while also charting at number 62 on the Oricon Weekly Streaming Chart.

== Track listing ==
=== CD ===
==== Limited edition 1 ====
1. "Hard Work" – 3:42
2. "Never Romantic" – 3:57
3. "Kimi Tōhikō" (君逃避行; lit. "Escape with You") – 3:06

==== Limited edition 2 ====
1. "Hard Work"
2. "Never Romantic"
3. "Mada Haru no Mama" (まだ春のまま; lit. "Still Like Spring") – 3:54

==== Regular edition ====
1. "Hard Work"
2. "Never Romantic"
3. "Sukisugi" (スキスギ; lit. "Too Much Love") – 3:40
4. "Shekimaha" (シェキマハ☆) – 4:06
5. "Hard Work" (instrumental) – 3:42
6. "Never Romantic" (instrumental) – 3:57
7. "Sukisugi" (instrumental) – 3:40
8. "Shekimaha" (instrumental) – 4:02

==== Limited edition (Sukisugi edition) ====
1. "Hard Work"
2. "Sukisugi"

==== Fanclub store online exclusive edition ====
1. "Hard Work"
2. "Never Romantic"

=== Blu-ray / DVD ===
==== Limited edition 1 ====
- "Hard Work" (music video)
- "Hard Work" (making of)

==== Limited edition 2 ====
- "Never Romantic" (music video, Romantic ver.)
- "Never Romantic" (solo version)
- "Never Romantic" (making of)
