= Sara Minami =

Japanese model and actress (born 2002)

- 南 沙良
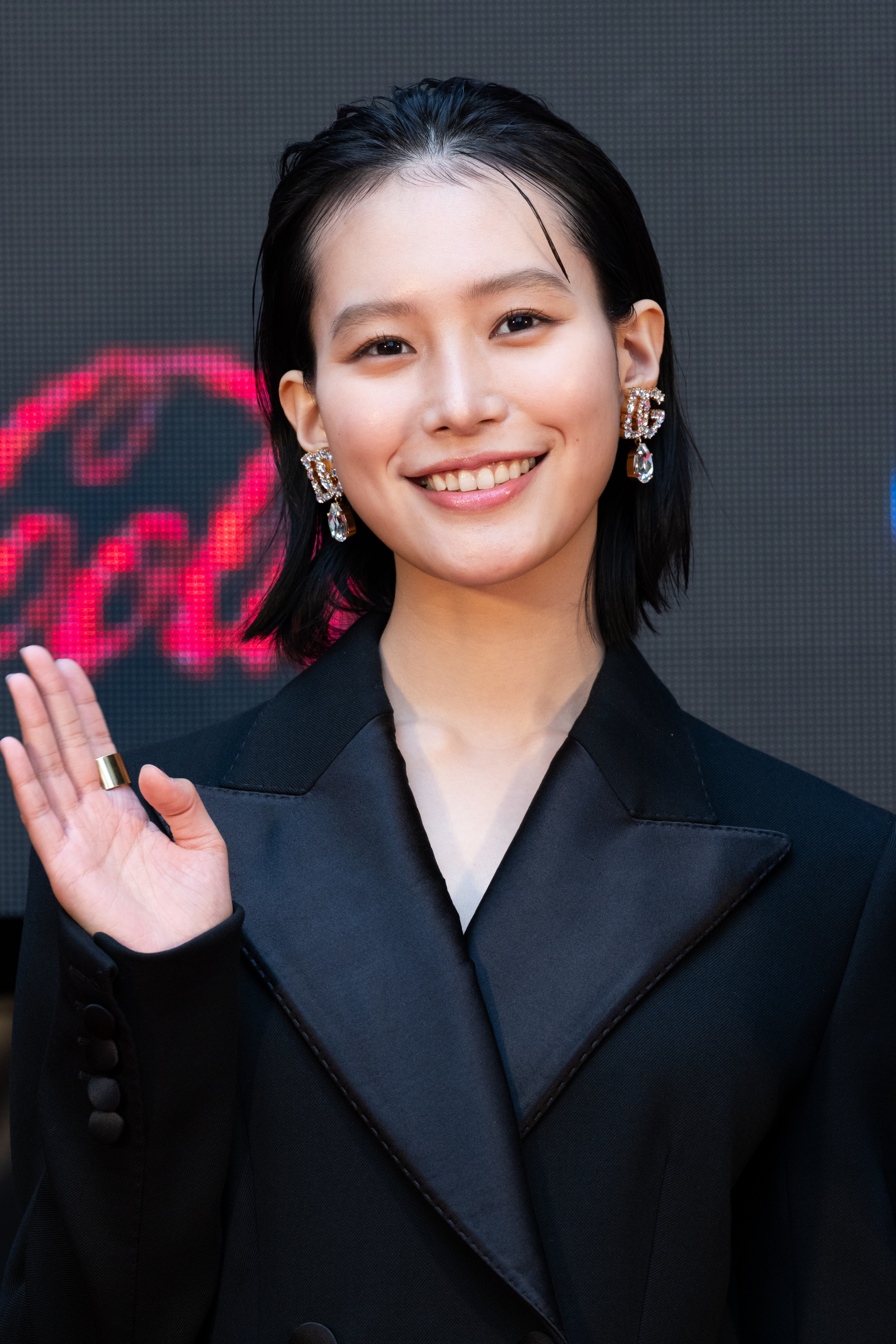
- Minami at the 37th Tokyo International Film Festival in 2024
- Born: June 11, 2002 (age 24); Kanagawa Prefecture, Japan
- Occupations: Actress; model
- Years active: 2014–present
- Hometown: Tokyo
- Agent: LesPros Entertainment
- Height: 160 cm (5 ft 3 in)

Sara Minami (南 沙良, Minami Sara; born June 11, 2002) is a Japanese actress and model under LesPros Entertainment.

She won the 18th Nicola Model Audition Grand Prix. She is a former exclusive model for the fashion magazine Nicola.

== Career ==
In 2014, she won the 18th Nicola Model Audition Grand Prix. In October of the same year, she became an exclusive model for the fashion magazine nicola.

In 2017, she made her debut as an actress in the movie Dear Etranger. She was nominated for the 60th Blue Ribbon Awards for Newcomers for her appearance in the film, but missed her award. In the same year, she starred in the music video for Rebecca's new song, Koini Ochitara.

In 2018, she made her movie debut starring in the movie Shino Can't Say Her Name. She played the role of a high school girl with stuttering, and showed impressing acting in the scene where she cried lamenting with a runny nose. Her performance in the film was rated highly, and along with double-starring Aju Makita, the two were awarded the 43rd Hochi Film Award for Best Newcomer and the 33rd Takasaki Film Festival Best New Actress Award. Additionally, Minami was awarded the 61st Blue Ribbon Award and 28th Japanese Movie Critics Award for New Actress. In September, she was appointed as the new image character for Pocky and made her first appearance in the commercials.

In 2019, she made her first appearance in a TV drama in Cocoa broadcast by Fuji TV on January 4, 2019. In March of the same year, she ended her contract as an exclusive model for nicola. She challenged jidaigeki historical drama for the first time in Iwane: Sword of Serenity released in May of the same year.

In 2021, she starred in the TV drama series Dragon Zakura broadcast on TBS.

In 2022, she acted in the NHK taiga drama The 13 Lords of the Shogun as Ohime, the daughter of Minamoto no Yoritomo and Hōjō Masako. She also played the main character in the horror movie The Good Father.

In 2023, she played the main character Sawako Kuronuma in the TV Tokyo adaptation of Kimi ni Todoke.

== Filmography ==
=== Film ===
Year	Title	Role	Notes	Ref.
2017	Dear Etranger	Kaoru Tanaka		
2018	Shino Can't Say Her Name	Shino Ōshima	Lead role	
2018	Mugen Foundation	Mirai		
2019	21st Century Girl		Anthology film	
2019	Iwane: Sword of Serenity	Iyo Sakazaki		
2020	Momi's House	Ayaka Honda	Lead role	
2021	The Sun Stands Still	Shiori Kikuchi		
2021	Zokki	Kyōko Matsubara		
2021	Ride or Die	Young Rei Nagasawa		
2022	The Good Father	Hana Kubo	Lead role	
2022	To Be Killed by a High School Girl	Maho Sasaki		
2025	Love Doesn't Matter to Me	Hiiro Miyata	Lead role	
2025	Echoes of Motherhood			
2026	All Greens	Hidemi Boku	Lead role	
2026	Mag Mag	Sanae	Lead role	
2026	Road to Vendetta	Kumo	Hong Kong-Japanese film	
2026	Magical Secret Tour	Mayu		
2026	Grotesqqque	Stella (voice)	Anthology film	
2027	Kaiji 4	Taeko Yuki		
2027	The Tiger and Her Wings: The Movie	Haruka Minami		

=== Television ===
Year	Title	Role	Notes	Ref.
2021	Dragon Sakura 2	Nao Hayase		
2022	The 13 Lords of the Shogun	Ōhime	Taiga drama	
2023	Kimi ni Todoke	Sawako Kuronuma	Lead role	
2023	Themis's Law School Classroom	Yukino Terui		
2024	Dear Radiance	Daini no Sanmi	Taiga drama	

=== Japanese dub ===
Year	Title	Role	Dub for	Notes	Ref.
2023	Dungeons & Dragons: Honor Among Thieves	Doric	Sophia Lillis		

== Awards and nominations ==
Year	Award	Category	Work(s)	Result	Ref.
2018	43rd Hochi Film Awards	Best New Artist	Shino Can't Say Her Name	Won	
2019	61st Blue Ribbon Awards	Best Newcomer	Shino Can't Say Her Name	Won	
2026	25th New York Asian Film Festival	Screen International Rising Star Asia Award	Magical Secret Tour	Won	
