= Doki It =

2025 single by Naniwa Danshi

- Regular Edition

Single by Naniwa Danshi

from the album Bon Bon Voyage
- A-side: "Doki It"
- B-side: "Don't Worry!!"; "Mirai Museigen"; "Love Triangle"; "Chau-Chau"; "Ticket"
- Released: February 26, 2025
- Genre: J-pop
- Length: 3:39
- Label: Storm Labels

Naniwa Danshi singles chronology
"Koisuru Hikari" (2024)	"Doki It" (2025)	"Asymmetry / Black Nightmare" (2025)

Music video
- "Doki it" on YouTube "Don’t Worry!!" on YouTube

"Doki It" is the eighth single by Japanese boy band Naniwa Danshi, released on February 26, 2025, by Storm Labels. The single was also made available for digital download and streaming the same day.

== Background and release ==
"Doki It" is the group's first single of 2025. The title "Doki It" is derived from the Japanese onomatopoeic expression "doki" (ドキッと), referring to the sound of a heartbeat and symbolizing feelings of excitement and anticipation, which reflect the song's theme. It was released in four editions: Limited Edition 1 (CD+DVD/Blu-ray), Limited Edition 2 (CD+DVD/Blu-ray), Regular Edition (CD only), and a Limited Production Edition (CD+DVD/Blu-ray).

The title track "Doki It" was used as the commercial song for AOKI's "Freshers Fair" campaign, which began airing nationwide on January 15, 2025. The song carries the message that "being yourself is the strongest" and expresses the excitement and anticipation found in everyday life. While primarily a positive rock tune, it incorporates elements of idol pop, rap, band sound, and mixture rock, highlighting the individuality of the seven members.

The music video was released on YouTube on February 2, 2025. Directed by Eri Yoshikawa, it depicts the members preparing for a move while encouraging new beginnings and challenges. The choreography was created by Hajimeko, featuring a finger-heart dance in the chorus. A dance practice video was released on February 26.

The coupling track "Don't Worry!!" is included in all editions and was used as the commercial song for SoftBank Group's "Tobideru" campaign. It is an urban pop track conveying the message that "it's okay to be yourself". Its music video, released on February 28, depicts an alternate scenario in which the seven members did not become Naniwa Danshi, portraying their individual life paths and eventual intersection.

== Chart performance ==
"Doki It" debuted at number one on the Oricon Weekly Singles Chart dated March 10, 2025, becoming Naniwa Danshi's eighth consecutive number-one single since their debut. The single also reached number one on the Oricon Weekly Combined Singles Chart. It peaked at number four on the Oricon Weekly Digital Singles (Track) Chart and ranked number two on the Oricon Monthly Singles Chart for February 2025.

On Billboard Japan, the single sold 336,000 copies in its first week and topped the Top Singles Sales chart. It also reached number one on the Billboard Japan Hot 100, marking the group's third number-one song on the chart. The song further peaked at number four on the Download Songs chart and number eight on the Hot Shot Songs chart.

== Track listing ==
Credits adapted from official sources.

=== CD ===
==== Limited Edition 1 ====
1. "Doki It" – 3:39
  Lyrics: Kenichi Sakamuro / Music: Kenichi Sakamuro, Kota Sahara / Arrangement: Masato Kuge
  AOKI "Freshers Fair" commercial song
2. "Don't Worry!!" – 3:33
  Lyrics: Yuki Tamatani / Music: Nils Rulewski Stenberg, Kazunari Okada, Yuki Tamatani
  SoftBank "Tobideru" commercial song
3. "Mirai Museigen" – 3:26
  Lyrics: KUSHITA, Yuki Tamatani / Music: KUSHITA, Yuki Tamatani, Tanshosora / Arrangement: Tanshosora
4. "Mirai Museigen" (Instrumental) – 3:22

==== Limited Edition 2 ====
1. "Doki It" – 3:39
2. "Don't Worry!!" – 3:33
3. "Love Triangle" – 4:46
  Lyrics: Kenichi Sakamuro / Music: Kenichi Sakamuro, Kota Sahara / Arrangement: Kota Sahara
4. "Love Triangle" (Instrumental) – 4:42

==== Regular Edition / Limited Production Edition ====
1. "Doki It" – 3:39
2. "Don't Worry!!" – 3:33
3. "Chau-Chau" – 3:35
  Lyrics: Yuna Okaya / Music: Hiromu, MONJOE, Yuna Okaya / Arrangement: Hiromu
4. "Ticket" – 3:49
  Lyrics: MiNE / Music: Susumu Kawaguchi, MiNE, Kota Sahara / Arrangement: Kota Sahara
5. "Doki It" (Instrumental) – 3:39
6. "Don't Worry!!" (Instrumental) – 3:33
7. "Chau-Chau" (Instrumental) – 3:34
8. "Ticket" (Instrumental) – 3:45

=== DVD / Blu-ray ===
==== Limited Edition 1 ====
- "Doki It" (Music Video & Making)

==== Limited Edition 2 ====
- "Don't Worry!!" (Music Video & Making)

==== Limited Production Edition ====
- "Naniwa Danshi Countdown 2024–2025" (Live & Making)
  Includes live footage from the "Naniwa Danshi Countdown 2024–2025" livestream held on New Year's Eve 2024, along with behind-the-scenes footage such as rehearsals and day-of performance coverage.
