= Muromachi Outsiders =

- DVD cover
- Directed by: Yu Irie
- Written by: Yu Irie
- Based on: Muromachi Bakufu by Ryôsuke Kakine
- Produced by: Yasuji Sudo; Kuryu Kazuma; Kitaoka Mutsumi
- Starring: Yo Oizumi; Kento Nagao; Wakana Matsumoto; Akira Emoto; Kazuki Kitamura; Shinichi Tsutsumi
- Cinematography: Ryô Ohtsuka
- Edited by: Takashi Satô
- Music by: Ike Yoshihiro
- Production company: Toei Studios Kyoto
- Distributed by: Toei
- Release date: 17 January 2025 (Japan)
- Running time: 135 minutes
- Country: Japan
- Language: Japanese

Muromachi Outsiders (Japanese: 室町無頼, Hepburn: Muromachi Burai), released in North America as Samurai Fury, is a 2025 Japanese period epic film directed by Yu Irie, starring Yo Oizumi, Kento Nagao, Wakana Matsumoto, Akira Emoto, Kazuki Kitamura and Shinichi Tsutsumi. Set in early 1460s Kyoto amidst the Kanshō famine, it follows rōnin Hasuda Hyoe as he leads an uprising against the shogunate. The film is an adaptation of the Ryôsuke Kakine novel Muromachi Bakufu.

== Plot ==
In the year 1461, western Japan is stricken by the Kanshō famine, with 82,000 people dying from the resulting epidemics while Nawa, the shōgun of Kyoto, raises taxes to fund his lavish lifestyle and corrupt monks ravage villagers who cannot repay their loans. Hasuda Hyoe, a rōnin, is hired by Honekawa Doken, the chief of security in Kyoto and Hasuda's former comrade, to prevent an uprising in Yoshizaka, Kawachi Province. He is given 600 mon and Saizō, an orphan who was captured by Honekawa's forces during a recent raid on a monastery.

After burning down a customs station, Hasuda and Saizō save Yoshizaka from a group of bandits. Hasuda later warns the villagers that the shōgunate is aware of their plans of staging an uprising, and they must be patient while he finds the right means to aid in their cause. Saizō is offered his freedom, but he chooses to follow the same path as Hasuda. The duo travels to Imazu, where Hasuda leaves Saizō to become an apprentice to Master Karasaki for a year.

Saizō spends the year mastering the bō and his combat skills. Hasuda reunites with Saizō and reveals that he has assembled an army to lead the insurgency against the shōgunate in Kyoto, planning their attack within a month. Honekawa confronts Hasuda over his decision to lead the uprising, but Hasuda explains all the suffering and hardships he witnessed under the shōgunate, and that he only needs one hour to destroy the promissory notes and retrieve the women taken by the monasteries. As word spreads out about the uprising, more and more rōnin side with Hasuda and Saizō. Hasuda sends a letter to Honekawa informing him the attack on Kyoto will be on 12 September at sunrise. In response, Nawa orders his army to massacre Yoshizaka as a warning to the insurgents. On 11 September, Saizō sends a message to Ho-ōji, a courtesan who is Hasuda's former lover, to leave Sanjō to safety before the attack begins.

The insurgency catches the city off-guard by attacking at midnight instead of the falsely announced sunrise time, with an army of 10,000 storming through the customs stations and arming every villager on their way to Nijō. Using directions relayed by Hasuda at the great pagoda, the insurgents weave their way around the city to avoid the samurai armies. Upon reaching Nijō, the insurgents set the monasteries ablaze and destroy the promissory notes before they are surrounded by the samurai and Honekawa. Hasuda and Saizō arrive at the scene to aid their comrades in the battle. As the insurgents celebrate in song and dance, Honekawa orders Hasuda and his army to leave the city.

By sunrise, Hasuda, Saizō, and their followers march to Nawa's palace, where they are confronted by Honekawa and a drunk Nawa. The insurgents are initially overwhelmed by Honekawa's army, but they immediately fight back as Saizō takes down the army and Nawa's bodyguards before a wounded Hasuda kills Nawa to avenge the villagers of Yoshizaka. Hasuda and Saizō reach the palace's main gate to place a sign that reads "outsider", marking the end of Nawa's reign.

Later that day, Honekawa locates Hasuda and Saizō by the river and kills Hasuda in a duel. He spares Saizō's life, banishing him from Kyoto for 10 years. Five years later, during the Ōnin War, Honekawa is captured and executed by the Hosokawa clan. Some time after his exile, Saizō reunites with Ho-ōji.

== Cast ==
- Yo Oizumi as Hasuda Hyoe
- Kento Nagao as Saizō
- Wakana Matsumoto as Ho-ōji
- Akira Emoto as Master Karasaki
- Kazuki Kitamura as Nawa
- Shinichi Tsutsumi as Honekawa Doken
- Yuya Endo as Akama Seishiro
- Tomoya Maeno as Nanao Genzo
- Ami 201 as Umakiri Emontaro
- Hannya as Kokichi
- Rina Takeda as Cho-hee
- Shingo Mizusawa as Densuke
- Joey Iwanaga as Zannosuke
- Miyu Yoshimoto as Osen
- Donpei as Magohachi
- Asuka Kawatoko as Kohagi
- Takuo Inari as Hikojiro
- Okito Serizawa as Kurando
- Yuji Asada as Zenami
- Aoi Nakamura as Ashikaga Yoshimasa
- Kenichi Yajima as Ise Sadachika
- Hiroki Miyake

== Production ==
In 2017, it was announced that Yo Oizumi and Shinichi Tsutsumi had been cast in a live-action film adaptation of Kakine Ryosuke's novel Muromachi Bakufu, which had been published the year prior. However, filming was delayed first by the COVID-19 pandemic in Japan and then by director Irie's schedule. The film was largely shot at various locations within Shiga Prefecture, including the Banshū Kiyomizu-dera Buddhist temple, though some scenes were filmed at Toei Studios Kyoto at the end of November 2023 on a set which took a month and a half to construct.

== Release ==
Muromachi Outsiders was released by Toei nationwide in Japan on 17 January 2025, though it was released in IMAX a week before on 10 January, becoming the first live-action film produced by Toei to be shown in IMAX.

The film made its North American premiere at the 24th New York Asian Film Festival under the title Samurai Fury. It was released on Blu-ray and streaming formats by Well Go USA Entertainment on 7 October 2025.

== Reception ==
The film received positive reviews from critics at Movie Walker Press. James Hadfield of The Japan Times rated the film three out of five stars and opined that while it "never quite settles on a consistent tone", it is "easier to follow" than 11 Rebels and is "one of [Irei's] better efforts to date", with Oizumi being in "commanding form." Peter Glagowski of Flixist considered it a "fairly run-of-the-mill" action film which, like 11 Rebels, fails at "honing in on any specific style." Panos Kotzathanasis of Asia Movie Pulse praised the film's blend of action and comedy, as well as its final act, but criticized its flat dialogue and the paper-thin character development. Adriano Ercolani of Cinema Daily US gave the film a B rating, saying: "As a period drama based on true events, the work of Yu Irie is surely entertaining and provides the right amount of depth in the main characters in order to feel for them."

== Accolades ==
Award	Date of ceremony	Category	Recipient	Result	Ref.
Japan Academy Film Prize	13 March 2026	Best Art Direction	Hiroto Matsuzaki	Nominated	
