= Naniwa Danshi =

Japanese idol boy band

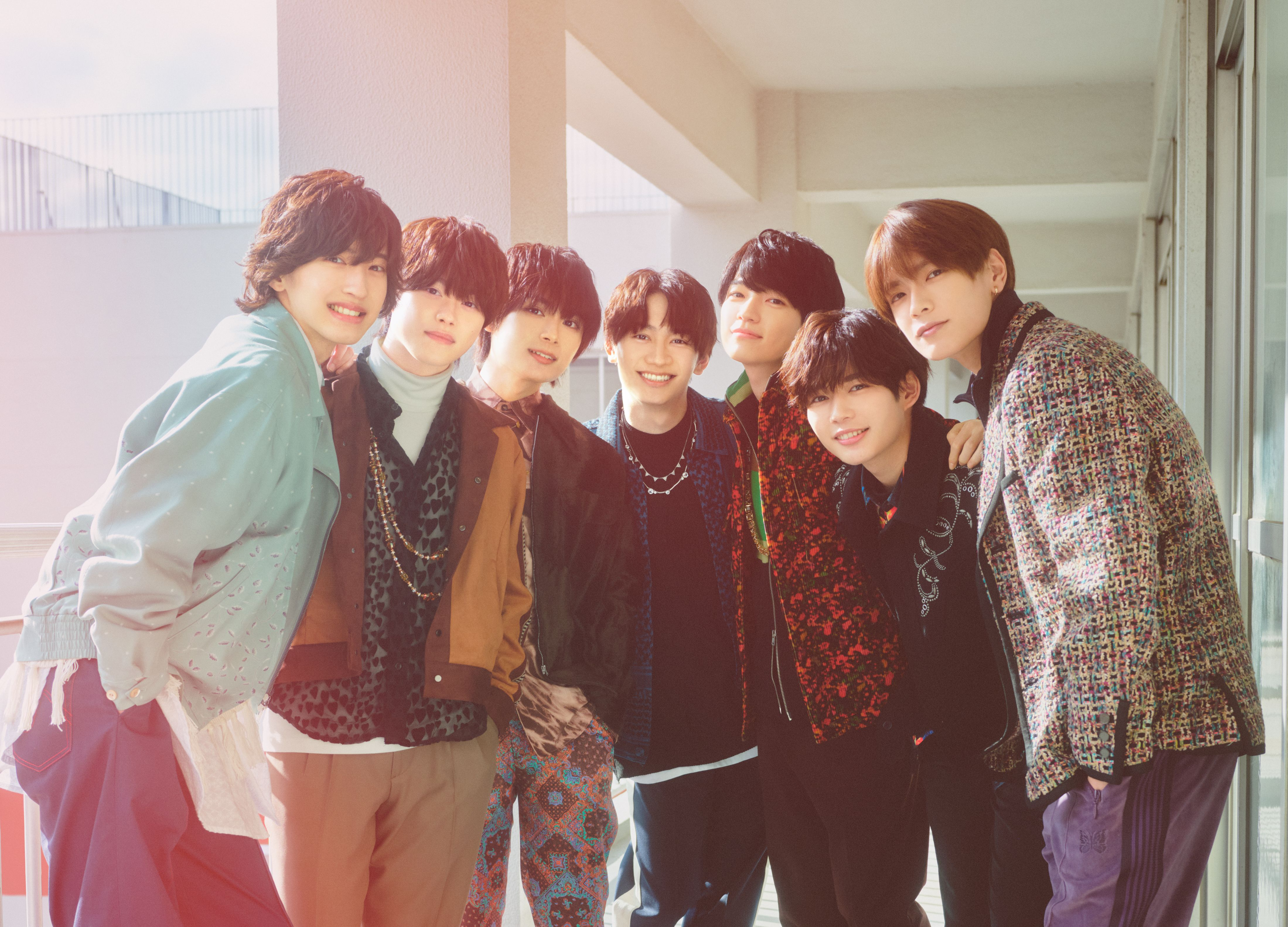
- Naniwa Danshi members from left to right: Shunsuke Michieda, Kazuya Ohashi, Ryusei Onishi, Joichiro Fujiwara, Daigo Nishihata, Kento Nagao, and Kyohei Takahashi.

Background information
- Origin: Japan
- Genre: J-pop
- Years active: 2021–present
- Label: Storm Labels
- Members: Daigo Nishihata; Ryusei Onishi; Shunsuke Michieda; Kyohei Takahashi; Kento Nagao; Joichiro Fujiwara; Kazuya Ohashi
- Website: Storm Labels Official Page

Naniwa Danshi (なにわ男子) is a Japanese boy band formed by Starto Entertainment. It consists of seven members who primarily come from the Kansai region. (Note: All members were born in Kansai region except Kazuya Ohashi; who was born in Fukuoka Prefecture. His family moved to Osaka when he was 3.) The group's official debut announcement was made through their label Storm Labels. Their debut single, "Ubu Love", was released on November 12, 2021. The name "Naniwa" refers to the old name of Osaka (also name of a ward in Osaka). They have sold over 6 million records in Japan since their debut.

== History ==
Naniwa Danshi is produced by Super Eight's Tadayoshi Okura. Prior to Naniwa Danshi, a Kansai Junior trio unit called Naniwa Ouji (なにわ皇子) was formed in August 2012. Naniwa Ouji includes the two current members Daigo Nishihata, Ryusei Onishi, and Ren Nagase, who later became a member of King & Prince.

The group's formation was informed to the members through mass e-mails, as opposed of being called directly to Johnny Kitagawa's place, leading members to think that "it was a prank." Nishihata originally thought it was a prank due to the group's name "Naniwa Danshi", due to it literally meaning "people from Kansai." Formation of Naniwa Danshi was the first time in 4 years for Kansai Junior and was publicly announced through the magazine Potato.

=== 2021-present: Debut ===
On January 5, 2021, Naniwa Danshi, along with two other Kansai Junior groups (Ae! group and Lil Kansai), joined the Junior official YouTube channel, indirectly replacing SixTones and Snow Man after their departure from the channel.

The group's official debut was announced through their Naniwa Danshi First Arena Tour 2021 #NaniwaDanshiShikaKatan concert at Yokohama Arena, which was also a surprise for themselves. The debut was announced on Naniwa Day (July 28). This also marks the long-awaited debut for Joichiro Fujiwara, who had been a trainee for 17 years 8 months—the longest in Starto Entertainment's history. Alongside their debut CD release, an Instagram account was also made. They also "graduated" from the Junior YouTube channel and opened their own YouTube channel.

In 2024, Super Eight, West, and Naniwa Danshi collaborated in all-Kansai group named Kamigata Boyz. (Note: The word "Kamigata" (上方) is a colloquial term for the Kansai region.) The group digital single, "Musekinin de Ee Janai ka Love" (無責任でええじゃないかLOVE) was released on May 3 and is available on music streaming sites. Hyadain wrote and composed the song. The song title is a combination of each group songs: Musekinin Hero (Super Eight), Eejanaika (West), and Ubu Love (Naniwa Danshi).

On August 13, during their talk segment on +Alpha concert at Yokohama Arena, the group announced their first Asia tour concert. The concert will be held in three cities Taipei, Seoul, and Hong Kong.

On June 28, 2025, during their ongoing live tour in Yokohama Arena, they announced that in 2026 they will be performing at Tokyo Dome and Kyocera Dome for the first time.

== Members ==
Name	Date of birth	Place of birth	Blood Type	Height	Member Color
Daigo Nishihata (西畑 大吾, Nishihata Daigo)	January 9, 1997 (age 29)	Osaka	AB	167cm	Red
Ryusei Onishi (大西 流星, Ōnishi Ryūsei)	August 7, 2001 (age 25)	Hyogo	O	166cm	Orange
Shunsuke Michieda (道枝 駿佑, Michieda Shunsuke)	July 25, 2002 (age 24)	Osaka	O	180cm	Pink
Kyohei Takahashi (高橋 恭平, Takahashi Kyōhei)	February 28, 2000 (age 26)	Osaka	B	176cm	Purple
Kento Nagao (長尾 謙杜, Nagao Kento)	August 15, 2002 (age 24)	Osaka	B	167cm	Yellow
Joichiro Fujiwara (藤原 丈一郎, Fujiwara Jōichirō)	February 8, 1996 (age 30)	Osaka	B	168cm	Blue
Kazuya Ohashi (大橋 和也, Ōhashi Kazuya)	August 9, 1997 (age 29)	Fukuoka	B	168cm	Green

== Discography ==
Naniwa Danshi discography
- Studio albums: 5
- Singles: 15
- Video albums: 5

=== Studio albums ===
List of studio albums, with selected details, chart positions and sales
Title	Details	Peak chart positions			Sales	Certifications
Title	Details	JPN	JPN Comb.	JPN Hot	Sales	Certifications
1st Love	Released: July 13, 2022; Label: J Storm; Formats: CD, CD+DVD, CD+BD, DL, streaming	1	1	1	JPN: 850,968	RIAJ: 3× Platinum (phy.)
Popmall	Released: July 12, 2023; Label: J Storm; Formats: CD, CD+DVD, CD+BD, DL, streaming	1	1	1	JPN: 438,091	RIAJ: 2× Platinum (phy.)
+Alpha (Note: Read as Plus Alpha)	Released: June 12, 2024; Label: Storm Labels; Formats: CD, CD+DVD, CD+BD, DL, streaming	1	1	1	JPN: 357,420	RIAJ: Platinum (phy.)
Bon Bon Voyage	Released: July 2, 2025; Label: Storm Labels; Formats: CD, CD+DVD, CD+BD	1	1	1	JPN: 334,417	RIAJ: Platinum (phy.)
ND5	Released: June 17, 2026; Label: Storm Labels; Formats: CD, CD+DVD, CD+BD	1	1	1	JPN: 409,711	RIAJ: Platinum (phy.)

=== Singles ===
List of singles, with selected chart positions, showing year released, certifications and album name
Title	Year	Peak chart positions			Sales	Certifications	Album
Title	Year	JPN	JPN Comb.	JPN Hot	Sales	Certifications	Album
"Ubu Love" (初心LOVE(うぶらぶ))	2021	1	1	1	JPN: 916,961	RIAJ: Million (phy.)	1st Love
"The Answer"	2022	1	1	1	JPN: 632,842	RIAJ: 2× Platinum (phy.)	1st Love
"Sachiare" (サチアレ)	2022	1	1	—	JPN: 632,842	RIAJ: 2× Platinum (phy.)	1st Love
"Happy Surprise" (ハッピーサプライズ)	2022	1	1	2	JPN: 516,195	RIAJ: 2× Platinum (phy.)	Popmall
"Special Kiss"	2023	1	1	2	JPN: 516,199	RIAJ: 2× Platinum (phy.)	Popmall
"Make Up Day"	2023	1	1	5	JPN: 394,213	RIAJ: Platinum (phy.)	+Alpha
"Missing"	2023	1	1	—	JPN: 394,213	RIAJ: Platinum (phy.)	+Alpha
"I Wish"	2023	1	1	2	JPN: 370,477	RIAJ: Platinum (phy.)	+Alpha
"Koisuru Hikari" (コイスルヒカリ)	2024	1	1	2	JPN: 400,104	RIAJ: Platinum (phy.)	Bon Bon Voyage
"Doki it"	2025	1	1	1	JPN: 324,660	RIAJ: Platinum (phy.)	Bon Bon Voyage
"Asymmetry" (アシンメトリー)	2025	1	1	1	JPN: 348,476	RIAJ: Platinum (phy.)	ND5
"Black Nightmare"	2025	1	1	—	JPN: 348,476	RIAJ: Platinum (phy.)	ND5
"Hard Work"	2026	1	1	2	JPN: 718,936	RIAJ: 3× Platinum (phy.)	ND5
"Moonlit"	2026	1	1	2	JPN: 403,049	RIAJ: Platinum (phy.)	Non-album single
"—" denotes releases that did not chart or were not released in that region.

=== Digital singles ===
List of digital singles
Title	Year	Peak chart positions		Album
Title	Year	JPN Comb.	JPN Hot	Album
"Arigatō Kokoro kara" (ありがとう心から)	2024	17	49	Bon Bon Voyage
"Yūki 100%" (勇気100％)	2024	17	59	Bon Bon Voyage
"Gira Gira Summer" (ギラギラサマー)	2025	—	65	Bon Bon Voyage
"Never Romantic"	2025	12	5	ND5

=== Video albums ===
List of video albums, with selected chart positions, sales and certifications
Title	Details	Peak chart positions		Certifications	Sales
Title	Details	JPN DVD	JPN BD	Certifications	Sales
Naniwa Danshi First Arena Tour 2021 #NaniwaDanshiShikaKatan	Released: February 23, 2022; Label: J Storm; Formats: DVD, BD	1	1	JPN: 251,518	RIAJ: Platinum
Naniwa Danshi Debut Tour 2022 1st Love	Released: April 26, 2023; Label: J Storm; Formats: DVD, BD	1	1	JPN: 302,000	RIAJ: Platinum
Naniwa Danshi Live Tour 2023 Pop Mall	Released: February 14, 2024; Label: Storm Labels; Formats: DVD, BD	1	1		RIAJ: Platinum
Naniwa Danshi Live Tour 2024 '+Alpha'	Released: March 23, 2025; Label: Storm Labels; Formats: DVD, BD	1	1		RIAJ: Gold
Naniwa Danshi Live Tour 2025 Bon Bon Voyage	Released: April 29, 2026; Label: Storm Labels; Formats: DVD, BD				

== Tie-ins ==
Title	Tie-in(s)	Album	Note	Note 2	Source
Boku Sora 〜Ashiato no Nai Mirai〜 (僕空〜足跡のない未来〜)	Theme song for Go! Go! Expo	1st Love		Pre-debut songs	
Aoharu 〜With U With me〜 (アオハル〜With U With Me〜)	Theme song for TV drama Seiho Boys' High School!	1st Love	Naniwa Danshi lead role	Pre-debut songs	
Yobaiboshi (夜這星)	Theme song for TV drama Captivated, by You	1st Love	Ryusei Onishi lead role	Pre-debut songs	
Yume Watashi (夢わたし)	Cheering song for 2021 Summer Koshien	1st Love		Pre-debut songs	
Ubu Love	Naniwa Danshi x GU collaboration campaign	1st Love		Debut single	
Ubu Love	Softbank "5G Lab" commercial	1st Love		Debut single	
Ubu Love	Theme song for TV drama My Love Mix-Up!	1st Love	Shunsuke Michieda lead role	Debut single	
Ubu Love	Lawson campaign	1st Love		Debut single	
The Answer	Theme song for TV drama The Kindaichi Case Files (2022)	1st Love	Michieda lead role	Double A-side single	
Sachiare	Theme song for Fuji TV's Mezamashi TV (April 2022〜)	1st Love		Double A-side single	
Sincere (シンシア)	Theme song for TV drama Rent-A-Girlfriend	1st Love	Onishi lead role		
Timeless Love	Theme song for TV drama Keshigomu o Kureta Joshi o Suki ni Natta.	1st Love	Ohashi lead role		
Happy Surprise	Campaign song for Sunstar's Ora2 me commercial	Pop Mall			
#MerryChristmas	Theme song for 2022 Lawson's Christmas campaign	Pop Mall			
Special Kiss	Theme song for movie And Yet, You Are So Sweet	Pop Mall	Kyohei Takahashi lead role		
Special Kiss	Commercial song for Naniwa Danshi x Softbank "Naniwa Danshi House"	Pop Mall			
Seishun Rhapsody (青春ラプソディ)	Commercial song for Benesse's Shinken Zemi	Pop Mall			
Blue Story	Commercial song for Fine Today's Sea Breeze	Pop Mall			
Make Up Day	Theme song for TV drama Beni Sasu Life	+Alpha	Onishi lead role	Double A-side single	
Missing	Theme song for TV drama Knockin' On Locked Door	+Alpha	Nishihata lead role	Double A-side single	
I Wish	Theme song for TV drama My Second Aoharu	+Alpha	Michieda lead role		
New Classic	Commercial song for AOKI's new graduates campaign	+Alpha			
Koisuru Hikari (コイスルヒカリ)	Theme song for movie We don't know love yet	Bon Bon Boyage	Onishi lead role		
Arigatou Kokoro Kara (ありがとう心から)	Theme songs for movie Nintama Rantaro the Movie: The Strongest Strategist of the Dokutake Ninja Squad	Bon Bon Boyage	Onishi and Fujiwara guest voice role		
Yūki 100% (勇気100%)	Theme songs for movie Nintama Rantaro the Movie: The Strongest Strategist of the Dokutake Ninja Squad	Bon Bon Boyage		Originally a song by Hikaru Genji for same anime franchise	
Doki It	Commercial song for AOKI's "Freshers Fair" campaign	Bon Bon Boyage			
Don’t Worry!!	Commercial song for Softbank's service "Tobideru"	Bon Bon Boyage			
Gira Gira Summer (ギラギラサマー)	Commercial song for Round 1	Bon Bon Boyage			
Asymmetry (アシンメトリー)	Theme song for TV drama Revenge Spy		Ohashi lead role	Double A-side single	
Black Nightmare	Theme song for TV drama Laundering		Joichiro Fujiwara lead role	Double A-side single	
Hirahira × Tokimeki	Commercial song for Softbank's issued Google Pixel 10 and Google Pixel Watch 4				
Never Romantic	Theme song for movie Romantic Killer		Takahashi lead role		
Never Romantic	Theme song for movie Romantic Killer		Fujiwara supporting role		
Hard Work	Theme song for TV drama Yokohama Neighbors Season 1		Onishi lead role		

== Filmography ==
=== Dramas & TV Shows etc ===
Run	Title	Network	Notes
2012	Maido! Jani〜	Fuji TV	Left in 2021 after official debut
2019	Naniwa Kara Ae Kaze Fukasemasu!	Kansai TV	
2020	Toshihita Kareshi	TV Asahi	Lead roles
2020	Seiho Boys' High School!	TV Tokyo	Lead roles
1994	Mezamashi TV	Fuji TV	Joined in 2020
2021	Mada Apude Shitenai no?	Fuji TV	

=== Documentary ===
Date	Title	Distributor	Note	Source
2021	Naniwa Danshi "Natural: Debut Made 1100nichi no Kiseki" (なにわ男子 デビューまで1100日のキセキ natural)	Amazon Prime Video		
2021	Naniwa Danshi ~Debut: Mou Hitotsu no Butai Ura~ (なにわ男子 〜デビュー もうひとつの舞台裏〜)	Fuji TV Amazon Prime Video Netflix	Part of Ride on Time (Season 4, episode 9-11)	
2022	Naniwa Danshi ~Bokura no Entertainment o Sagashite...~ (なにわ男子〜僕らのエンターテインメントを探して…〜)	Fuji TV Amazon Prime Video Netflix	Part of Ride on Time (Season 5, episode 1-4)	

=== Films ===
Date	Title	Distributor	Notes
2016	Kansai Johnny's Jr's Mezase! Dream stage!	Shochiku	Pre Naniwa Danshi formation
2017	Kansai Johhny's Jr's Owarai Star Tanjô!	Shochiku	Pre Naniwa Danshi formation
2019	Shonentachi	Shochiku	

=== Commercials ===
Date	CM	Company
2019	Universal Crystal Christmas	Universal Studios Japan
2020	DecoLu	Johnny's Island
2021	LAWSON	LAWSON
2021	Hi-Chew	Morinaga Seika
2021	GU	GU
2021	5G LAB	SoftBank
2022	Hi-Chew	Morinaga Seika
2022	Patisserie NANIWA	LAWSON

== Concert tours ==
=== Solo concerts ===
- Naniwa Danshi First Live Tour 2019 ~Naniwa Danshi to Isshoni #Aoharu Shiyo?~ (2019-2020)
  (なにわ男子 First Live Tour 2019〜なにわと一緒に#アオハルしよ?〜)
- ~~NANIWA DANSHI LIVE 2020 「Shall we #AOHARU」(2020)~~ (Note: Cancelled due to COVID-19 pandemic. Replaced with online concert Kansai Johnny's DREAM PAVILION 〜Shall we #AOHARU?〜)
- Kansai Johnny's DREAM PAVILION 〜Shall we #AOHARU?〜 (streamed on Family Club Online)
- Naniwa Danshi First Arena Tour 2021 #NaniwaDanshiShikaKatan
  (なにわ男子 First Arena Tour 2021 #なにわ男子しか勝たん)
- Naniwa Danshi Debut Tour 2022 1st Love
  (なにわ男子 Debut Tour 2022 1st Love)
- Naniwa Danshi Live Tour 2023 Pop Mall
  (なにわ男子 LIVE TOUR 2023 POP MALL)
- Naniwa Danshi Live Tour 2024 '+Alpha'
  (なにわ男子 LIVE TOUR 2024 ’+Alpha’)
  - Naniwa Danshi ASIA TOUR 2024+2025 '+Alpha' (held in Taipei, Seoul, and Hong Kong)
- Naniwa Danshi Live Tour 2025 'BON BON VOYAGE'
  (なにわ男子 LIVE TOUR 2025 'BON BON VOYAGE')
- Naniwa Danshi 1st Dome Live 'Voyage'
  (なにわ男子 1st DOME LIVE 'VoyAGE')

=== Joint concerts ===
- Johnny's Festival 〜Thank you 2021 Hello 2022〜 (2021)
- Johnny's Countdown (since 2021)
- WE ARE! Let's get the party STARTO!! (2024)
- Kamigata Boyz Dream IsLAND 2024 ~Yappa Kono Machi Sukkyanen~
  (KAMIGATA BOYZ DREAM IsLAND 2024 〜やっぱこの街好っきゃねん〜)

=== Pre-debut concerts ===
- Fall in Love ~Aki ni Kanju ni Koishichainayo~ (2018)
  (Fall in LOVE〜秋に関ジュに恋しちゃいなよ〜)
- Kansai Johnny's Jr (X'mas Party!! 2018)
- Kansai Johnny's Jr. Live 2019 Happy 2 Year!! ~Kotoshi mo Kanju to Chu Year!~
  (関西ジャニーズJr. LIVE 2019 Happy 2 year!!〜今年も関ジュとChu Year!!〜)
- Kansai Johnny's Jr (SPRING SPECIAL SHOW 2019)
- Johnny's IsLAND Festival (2019)
- Johnny's Jr. 8.8 Matsuri ~Tokyo Dome kara Hajimaru~ (2019)
  (ジャニーズJr.8・8祭り〜東京ドームから始まる〜)
- Kanju: Yume no Kansai Island 2020 in Kyocera Dome Osaka ~Asobi ni Oide ya! Manzoku 100%~
  (関ジュ 夢の関西アイランド 2020 in 京セラドーム大阪 〜遊びにおいでや！満足 100%〜)
- Johnny's World Happy LIVE with YOU（2020, online)
- Johnny's Dream IsLAND 2020 > 2025 ~Daisuki na Kono Machi kara~ (2020, online)
  (Johnny’s DREAM IsLAND 2020→2025 〜大好きなこの街から〜)
- Kansai Johnny's Jr. Akeome Concert 2021 ~Kanju ga Gyuuuutto Daishuugou~
  (関西ジャニーズJr. あけおめコンサート2021〜関ジュがギューっと大集合〜)

== Other media ==
A virtual idol collaboration project between Starto Entertainment and Showroom started from 2019 which features two members Joichiro Fujiwara and Kazuya Ohashi. They voiced the members of duo unit Ascana: Asuka Kaido (海堂 飛鳥, Kaidō Asuka) and Kanata Ichigoya (苺谷 星空, Ichigoya Kanata), respectively. The duo streamed every day at 21:30 JST on Showroom. Honeyworks handles the music and character designs. Along with Naniwa Danshi's official debut, both of them "graduated" from the project in 2021.

Ascana has released 5 original songs:

- "Yowamushi-tachi no Sekai Seifuku" (弱虫たちの世界征服, lit. "The Weakling's World Conquer")
- "Shiny Wedding" (シャイニーウェディング)
- "Lv.1"
- "Pudding to Cream Stew" (プリンとクリームシチュー)
- "Step x Smile x Step" (ステップ×スマイル×ステップ)
