= Romantic Killer =

Japanese manga series

- First tankōbon volume cover, featuring Anzu Hoshino (front) and Tsukasa Kazuki (back)

ロマンティック・キラー (Romantikku Kirā)
- Genre: Romantic comedy; Comedy drama
- Manga
- Written by: Wataru Momose
- Published by: Shueisha
- English publisher: NA: Viz Media
- Imprint: Jump Comics+
- Magazine: Shōnen Jump+
- Original run: July 30, 2019 – June 2, 2020
- Volumes: 4
- Original net animation
- Directed by: Kazuya Ichikawa
- Written by: Sayuri Ōba; Hiroko Fukuda
- Music by: Ryo Kawasaki; Tomoyuki Kono
- Studio: Domerica
- Licensed by: Netflix
- Released: October 27, 2022
- Runtime: 24–31 minutes
- Episodes: 12
- Live-action film
- Directed by: Tsutomu Hanabusa
- Written by: Junpei Yamaoka
- Studio: Toho Studios; Dub
- Released: December 12, 2025
- Runtime: 106 minutes
- icon

Romantic Killer (Japanese: ロマンティック・キラー, Hepburn: Romantikku Kirā) is a Japanese web manga series written and illustrated by Wataru Momose. It was serialized in Shueisha's Shōnen Jump+ website from July 2019 to June 2020, with its chapters collected in four tankōbon volumes.

An original net animation (ONA) series adaptation produced by Domerica was released on Netflix in October 2022. A live-action film adaptation was released in Japan in December 2025.

== Plot ==
One day, a wizard claiming to be a "love cupid" named Riri appears before Anzu Hoshino, a high school girl who has no interest in romance outside of video game characters. The world where Riri comes from is founded on giving dreams and hopes to children, and collecting their pure hearts as energy in return. Due to Japan's declining birth rate problem assumed by the decrease in romance opportunities between men and women, Riri is sent to assist Anzu in experiencing real-life romance with a pool of "ikemen" for her to choose from. Despite Anzu's rejection due to her zero interest in pursuing real-life romance, Riri confiscates her "three greatest desires", video games, chocolate, and her cat Momohiki, and conspires a series of events to make Anzu encounter shōjo manga-esque situations, leaving her with no choice. Anzu decided to play along with Riri's "game", but hopes to make Riri give up and release their "hostages" by avoiding all the romance-possible situations with all of her might so she can go back to her normal life.

== Characters ==
Anzu Hoshino (星野 杏子, Hoshino Anzu)
Voiced by: Rie Takahashi (Japanese); Deneen Melody (English)
Portrayed by: Moka Kamishiraishi
The protagonist who bears the "anti-heroine" attribute. A high school first year who claims her three great desires are video games, cats (especially her pet Momohiki), and chocolate. She has no interest in real life romance and has been counter-measuring all the shōjo manga-esque situations conspired by Riri. She is logical, blunt, and very caring person who can't leave her friends when they're in trouble. She cares little for how strangers perceive her, and will always stay true to her internal sense of right and wrong. She is well known for her bushy red hair and her love of cat-themed clothes. She has katsaridaphobia (fear of cockroaches).
Riri/Rio (リリ/リオ)
Voiced by: Mikako Komatsu (anime), Shunsuke Ito (live-action film) (Japanese); Courtney Lin (English)
Portrayed by: Hikaru Takahashi (Riri Fushigi)
A mascot-type wizard who was sent to assist Anzu in pursuing romance. They appear to be cunning and manipulative; resorting to anything possible just so Anzu can encounter shōjo manga-like situations. They can shapeshift into a human girl going by Riri Fushigi (伏木 リリ, Fushigi Riri) or a boy going by Rio Fushigi (伏木 リオ, Fushigi Rio). They claim either to be Anzu's "cousin", and often use either of these forms to spur Anzu along or spark jealousy between candidates. It is revealed that they never ever once manipulated any of the boys' feelings, and the only memory manipulation had been making Junta believe he had already gotten back in touch with Anzu. As such, the boys' affections toward Anzu had always been real. After violating their work policy, Riri was replaced by another wizard named Kate to assist Anzu, but Anzu brought them back by adding Riri as a romance candidate after Riri revealed their wish to stay by her side.
Tsukasa Kazuki (香月 司, Kazuki Tsukasa)
Voiced by: Yūichirō Umehara (Japanese); Jason Griffith (English)
Portrayed by: Kyōhei Takahashi
A cold and reserved boy who is Anzu's first romance candidate. He is popular among women due to his good looks but tends to avoid them, rejecting any romantic proposals outright. He meets Anzu in a meet cute where she accidentally bumps into him and breaks his cellphone. Due to Riri's meddling, his apartment is flooded and he has to live with Anzu early in the story. It is later revealed that before transferring schools he was a warm and caring person who could "befriend anyone", indicating that his cold appearance is a facade. His personality changed drastically after being repeatedly stalked by an older woman he had helped once, to the point where he was forced to transfer from his apartment and school to be away from her and his strict father who blamed him for the situation. He then became lonely and distant after living alone. In an effort to distance himself from women's attention, he often wears hats in public and experiences panic attacks if left alone with them due to traumatic memories. He finally realizes his hidden feelings for Anzu after she helps him many times, considering her to be his savior.
Junta Hayami (速水 純太, Hayami Junta)
Voiced by: Gakuto Kajiwara (Japanese); Aleks Le (English)
Portrayed by: Masaya Kimura
The "childhood friend" that Riri set up for Anzu. Anzu originally believed him to be a random hot guy brainwashed by Riri, but it is later revealed that he is in fact a childhood friend of Anzu whom she called "Tonta" who looked completely different back then, and that his feelings for Anzu are genuine. Tonta was shy, heavy-set, and found it difficult to make friends before he met Anzu and bonded with her over the fictional video game Cat Ranger. He has grown very tall and muscular, and is known as the "rookie baseball star" at his school. It is later revealed that he had picked up baseball and changed himself after overhearing Anzu say that she would like to date an "athletic guy who can beat the boss." Anzu is aware of his feelings for her, and acts oblivious to hide it from him. He is sincere and somewhat cowardly, also hiding from cockroaches like Anzu, but is not afraid to physically confront anyone who hurts his friends.
Hijiri Koganei (小金井 聖, Koganei Hijiri)
Voiced by: Natsuki Hanae (Japanese); Kellen Goff (English)
Portrayed by: Sōta Nakajima
A wealthy boy who is not in touch with the lives of "peasants", also set up by Riri for Anzu. He meets Anzu in a twist on a classic anime meet cute, where she is running late to school and is hit by his car. He takes her on a date for compensation, assuming she got hit on purpose, and is shocked when she rejects him. He is not used to having girls reject him so he tries to woo Anzu by buying her off. After being called out further by Anzu, he tries to navigate common life by getting a job at the convenience store where Anzu works at and getting his own money. Knowing how much Hijiri was used to getting what he wanted, his father had transferred him from his former private school so that he could learn to fend for himself. It is shown that he too gradually developed a romantic interest in Anzu, as well as a tsundere personality.
Tsuchiya (土屋)
Voiced by: Kenjiro Tsuda (Japanese); Matthew David Rudd (English)
Portrayed by: Terunosuke Takezai
Hijiri Koganei's chauffeur who cares for him deeply. He offers romantic advice to Hijiri, and at times appears as a joke romance candidate, considered equally handsome to the candidates. He can appear by Hijiri's side at the click of a finger, and gets emotional when Hijiri expresses gratitude to him. He genuinely appreciates Anzu's presence in Hijiri's life, and considers her to be a very good influence on him. Unfortunately, because of the number of girls who have flung themselves in front of his car to get to Hijiri, he is on a watch list.
Saki Takamine (高峯 咲姫, Takamine Saki)
Voiced by: Manaka Iwami (Japanese); Jenny Yokobori (English)
Portrayed by: Juri Kōsaka
Anzu's best female friend at school. She treasures her bond with Anzu as Anzu had defended her during her difficult time in middle school. She met Anzu when she was shoved down by a jealous school bully, and Anzu forced the bully to apologize. Since then, she has come to rely on Anzu to save her, and wants to support Anzu in her own way. Like Tsukasa, she is very popular, and has had to deal with unwanted advances from those around her. In particular, in middle school, she dated a seemingly kind senior classmate after being asked out by him every day. At first he acts like the perfect gentleman, but attempted to force himself on her when they were alone. He attempted to spread rumors about her to the school to cover his actions, but Anzu confronts him. Because of the courage Anzu has given her, she has become someone not to be messed with, and is unafraid of shooting lecherous comments down, countering them with equally personal questions. She finds about Anzu living with Tsukasa and Junta and promises to keep it a secret.
Makoto Oda (織田 真斗, Oda Makoto)
Voiced by: Hiro Shimono (Japanese); Ryan Colt Levy (English)
Tsukasa Kazuki's easygoing and reliable friend. He is somewhat air-headed and oblivious, but because of his kind personality, Tsukasa can let his guard down around him. He is puzzled by Tsukasa's cold attitude to girls, and often apologizes on his friend's behalf. Before Anzu, Makoto was Tsukasa's only friend at this new school. He has older sisters who are boorish and slovenly around his house, which has made him less interested in having a dating life. He admires Junta for his athleticism and handsomeness, fawning over how cool Junta must be. When Saki was uncomfortable after seeing her middle school abuser at a Summer Festival, Makoto was able to read the signs and swoop Saki away by the hand.
Arisa Kazuki (香月 愛里紗, Kazuki Arisa)
Voiced by: Marina Inoue (Japanese); Gilli Messer (English)
Tsukasa Kazuki's kind older sister. Her and Tsukasa are both very attractive, becoming a pair of siblings that are "blindingly beautiful." She first encounters Anzu when Anzu is harassed after spilling a stranger's coffee. She comes to Anzu's rescue, and when she sees Anzu and her brother together, she immediately sees potential for their relationship. She is very supportive of her younger brother, as she has protected him from the past from their father, and Tsukasa's stalker. She is protective of Tsukasa, and is thankful that Anzu is by Tsukasa's side. She tends to tease Anzu and Tsukasa, although she is not overly pushy considering Tsukasa's past.
Yukana Kishi (岸 優花菜, Kishi Yukana)
Voiced by: Yoko Hikasa (Japanese); Jesse Valinsky (English)
Portrayed by: Kasumi Mori
Tsukasa's unstable stalker. She is a young woman in her twenties who was bullied at her workplace. Because she was outcast, she was "saved" by Tsukasa when he helped her up after she fell, and gave her bag back to her. This later becomes his greatest regret. She exhibits many yandere stalking tendencies, such as waiting for Tsukasa before and after school, sending him packages under false names, and even drugging him so they can be alone in his room. She also hacks his online accounts to frame their relationship as romantic. This tarnishes Tsukasa's reputation, and forces him to move away, but she finds him through the background of a candid social media photo. Tsukasa's mother, Arisa and Anzu are all "horrible" in her eyes, as they try to tear "their love" apart. She assaults Anzu, but gets arrested. Yukana is sent to a medical facility when Hijiri uses his family connections to put a stop to her uncle bribing the authorities. Even hospitalized, she is fixated on Tsukasa, and the only way to stop her is for Riri to wipe her memories. Once wiped, the threat seems to disappear, but Riri's co-worker Cupid, Kate, has assigned Yukana as their client in a cliffhanger ending.

== Media ==
=== Manga ===
Written and illustrated by Wataru Momose, Romantic Killer was serialized in Shueisha's Shōnen Jump+ website from July 30, 2019, to June 2, 2020. The first tankōbon volume was released on December 4, 2019. The second to fourth volumes were released digitally on March 4, August 4, and September 4, 2020; the volumes were released in print on October 4, 2022.

In February 2022, Viz Media announced that they licensed the series for English publication. Shueisha's Manga Plus platform is also digitally releasing the series in English.

==== Volumes ====
No.	Original release date	Original ISBN	English release date	English ISBN
1	December 4, 2019	978-4-08-882164-1	October 4, 2022	978-1-9747-3469-6
1. "For a magical-world setup, that's too complicated!" (魔法設定なのに漢字が多いんだよっ, Mahō setteinanoni kanji ga ōi nda yotsu); 2. "Awaken, my inner soldier!" (目覚めよ あたしの中のソルジャー, Mezameyo atashi no naka no sorujā); 3. "3D somehow beat out 2D?" (二次元が三次元に負けた…！, Nijigen ga sanjigen ni maketa…!); 4. "Am I the man in this scene?" (なんだこの男らしい状況〜っ, Nanda kono otokorashī jōkyō 〜 tsu); 5. "Challenge accepted." (受けて立とうじゃない, Ukete tatou janai); 6. "It's time for the children to be abed." (子供はもう寝る時間ですよ☆, Kodomo wa mō nerujikandesu yo ☆); 7. "What, did it get dropped in Tokyo Bay?!" (さっきまで東京湾に沈んでたの!?, Sakki made Tōkyōwan ni shizun deta no!?); 8. "So this is what he was after...!" (アイツの狙いはこれだったのか…!!, Aitsu no nerai wa koredatta no ka…!!); 9. "Don't call it easy!" (イージーとか言ったるな!!!, Ījī toka ittaru na! ! !)
2	March 4, 2020 (digital); October 4, 2022 (print)	978-4-08-883326-2	January 3, 2023	978-1-9747-3507-5
10. "Like that Hercules?!" (剣闘士!?, Ken tōshi!?); 11. "I can't believe I'm actually saying this." (このセリフを言う日が来るとは…, Kono serifu o iu hi ga kuru to wa…); 12. "She's even more aggravating as a human!" (生身の方が厄介じゃねーか…！, Namami no kata ga yakkaija ne ̄ ka…!); 13. "It's a sign of my steel will!" (これがあたしの覚悟だ！, Korega atashi no kakugoda!); 14. "You ignore the high school girl's stuff to go for the mom's?!" (現役女子高生差し置いて母親ーー!!, Gen'eki mesukōsei sashioite hahaoya ̄̄ !!); 15. "I feel so uncomfortable in this!" (オラ落ちつかねぇぞ…！, Ora ochitsukane~e zo…!); 16. "Did I get reincarnated into another world?" (異世界転生かな？, Isekai tensei ka na?); 17. "Okay, he's just weird." (クセが強いんじゃぁ, Kuse ga tsuyoi n ja~a); 18. "Is it made of vintage silk?!" (古より伝わりし絹で作ったんか!?, Inishie yori tsutawarishi kinu de tsukutta n ka!?); 19. "Leave." (帰れ, Kaere); 20. "Don't turn him tsundere!" (ツンデレ付与されてるーーっ, Tsundere fuyo sa re teru ̄̄ ~tsu)
3	August 4, 2020 (digital); October 4, 2022 (print)	978-4-08-883327-9	April 4, 2023	978-1-9747-3508-2
21. "Nothing terrifies me more than c********es!" (Gに勝る恐怖なし!!, G ni masaru kyōfu nashi!!); 22. "Where are my black-out curtains when I need them?!" (目に遮光カーテン欲しい!!, Me ni shakō kāten hoshī!); 23. "I swear on my life and the lives of my descendants for seven generations." (この命と子々孫々をかけて, Kono inochi to shishisonson o kakete); 24. "It's not like we're going to a public toilet." (公衆便所に行くんじゃないんですから☆, Kōshū benjo ni iku n janai ndesukara ☆); 25. "I feel like a real goose!" (アイ アム ア バード！, Ai amu a bādo!); 26. "I'm not that pig that'll remain nameless!" (どっかの豚じゃあるまいし!!, Dokka no buta jaarumaishi!!); 27. "I wish I had a shell to hide in!" (私は貝があったら入りたい…, Watashi wa kai ga attara hairitai…); 28. "Side Story: Middle School" (SideStory［中学生編］, SideStory [chūgakusei-hen]); 29. "You made me get ginger ale up my nose!" (ジンジャエールが染み入る!!, Jinjaēru ga shimiiru!!); 30. "I couldn't help the ginger ale." (ジンジャエールは不可抗力だ, Jinjaēru wa fukakōryokuda); "World's End Harem Special Collaboration Chapter" (終末のハーレムコラボ特別編, Shūmatsu no hāremukorabo tokubetsu-hen)
4	September 4, 2020 (digital); October 4, 2022 (print)	978-4-08-883328-6	July 4, 2023	978-1-9747-3509-9
31. "That was worth more than your life!" (高いんだぞ！お前の命よりも!!, Takai nda zo! Omae no inochi yori mo!!); 32. "Stand over here so I can beat the drum with your head." (太鼓にドゴンしてやる, Taiko ni dogon shite yaru); 33. "If you don't want to, say so." (イヤだったら言って, Iyadattara itte); 34. "You can turn off the tsundere act. Thanks." (あ、わざわざツンデレやんなくていいんで, A, wazawaza tsundereyan nakute īnde); 35. "Get lost, avatar of all that's negative in my life." (失せろ あたしのネガティブの具現化, Usero atashi no negatibu no gugen-ka); 36. "I won't give up either." (あたしも諦めない！, Atashi mo akiramenai!); 37. "You still look like the world's biggest turd to me." (世界に一つだけの野グソにしか見えないから, Sekai ni hitotsudake no no guso ni shika mienaikara); 38. "What do you want to do?" (〜Last Story〜 あんたはどうしたいの！, 〜 Last Story 〜 anta wa dō shitai no!); "Original Manga Special: Halloween" (描き下ろし特別漫画 ～ハロウィン～, Kaki oroshi tokubetsu manga ~ harō~in ~)

=== Anime ===
In August 2022, the Shōnen Jump+ website announced that the series would be adapted into an original net animation. It is produced by Domerica and directed by Kazuya Ichikawa, with Sayuri Ōba and Hiroko Fukuda overseeing the scripts, Arisa Matsuura designing the characters, and Ryo Kawasaki and Tomoyuki Kono composing the music. The series was released on Netflix on October 27, 2022. The opening theme is "Roma Kira", performed by Yurika, while the ending theme is "Romantic Love (Renai Shimasen ka?)" (Romantic Love～恋愛しませんか？☆～; lit. 'Romantic Love (Won't You Fall in Love?)'), performed by Mikako Komatsu.

==== Episodes ====
No.	Title	Original release date
1	"Why Is There So Much Legalese in Magic!?"; Transliteration: "Mahō Settei na no ni Kanji ga Ōi nda yo!" (Japanese: 魔法設定なのに漢字が多いんだよっ!)	October 27, 2022
High school freshman Anzu Hoshino only loves beating final bosses in video games, gobbling down chocolates and kissing her pet cat Momohiki. One day, a wizard named Riri, who claims to be a "love cupid", appears out of the television and selects Anzu as a test subject to turn her romantic inexperience into a real-life dating sim. In order to help Anzu stay on task until she can achieve a "lovely romantic thriller level relationship", Riri confiscates Anzu's three greatest desires by changing all the video games to packaged kabayaki and by removing the chocolate flavor from her favorite snacks, all to solve Japan's declining birth rate problem. After Momohiki is sent away with Anzu's parents, who are traveling overseas for work in the United States, an infuriated Anzu swears to spitefully avoid romance at all costs. Riri orchestrates a meet cute for Anzu outside a convenience store, where she accidentally bumps into Tsukasa Kazuki and breaks his cellphone in the process. After encountering Tsukasa in the subway station the next day, Anzu realizes that Tsukasa is a popular student at her high school, though she is repeatedly put off by his aloof personality. When Anzu returns home in the afternoon, she is bored without her video games, but she is then scared off by a cockroach, viewing it like a slice of strawberry cake as a coping mechanism. Anzu sulks in a playground as it begins to rain, but she is soon spotted by Tsukasa holding an umbrella.
2	"It's Time for Children to Go to Sleep"; Transliteration: "Kodomo wa Mō Nerujikan Desu yo" (Japanese: 子供はもう寝る時間ですよ☆)	October 27, 2022
Anzu has no choice but to share the umbrella with Tsukasa as they walk to his apartment to dry up. After Anzu mentions her katsaridaphobia, Tsukasa offers to exterminate the cockroach at her house. They become friends after he manages to get rid of the cockroach despite her accidentally tackling him. However, Tsukasa is forced to bunk with Anzu overnight when the rain escalates into a typhoon, which Anzu confirms that Riri had something to do with this. Ignoring Riri's suggestion to make a dazzling homecooked meal, Anzu gives Tsukasa some instant noodles for dinner. After taking a bath, Anzu deliberately wears her unflattering cat-themed pajamas. Anzu and Tsukasa decide to play board games to pass the time, as to which Anzu has an undefeated winning streak in Reversi. Unfortunately, her luck turns around when they play The Game of Life, in which she loses after landing on all the bad spaces, thanks to Riri. After Anzu burns a pan of scrambled eggs, Tsukasa decides to prepare exquisite boxed lunches for school. Anzu realizes that Tsukasa might not be as aloof as she originally thought. A disappointed Riri later causes Anzu to fall asleep on the couch in the living room. As Anzu dreams about holding Momohiki, Tsukasa tries to wake her up, but she grabs his hand and refuses to let go. Tsukasa accepts that he is stuck there for the night, realizing that he has not had that much fun in a long time.
3	"My Life Has Become a Dating Sim"; Transliteration: "Otomegē Seikatsu Hajimemashita!?" (Japanese: 乙女ゲー生活はじめました!?)	October 27, 2022
When her dream turns into a nightmare, Anzu is mortified when she finds herself lying on Tsukasa's lap. Anzu is later dismayed upon learning that the typhoon caused Tsukasa's apartment to be flooded, to which Anri suspects Riri again. At school during lunch period, Anzu's best friend Saki Takamine is amazed at Anzu's boxed lunch, unknowingly prepared by Tsukasa. Two of Tsukasa's fans named Rena Kashiwagi and Yukika Maezono accompany Anzu to the Toutor Cafe, where Anzu planned to meet with Tsukasa after school. An annoyed Tsukasa abruptly leaves with Anzu, forbidding Rena and Yukika from tagging along. Tsukasa explains that he is uninterested in dating, leading Anzu to believe that she can become his friend without risking romance. He informs her that there are no available apartments anywhere, in which she speculates that Riri so expertly manipulated this. Nonetheless, Anzu agrees for Tsukasa to room with her for a month. During their first day living together, Anzu notices that Tsukasa is very helpful and hardworking around the house. Riri later appears to remind Anzu that she is experiencing a dating sim lifestyle, meaning that there will be multiple bachelors. At that moment, Anzu is taken back when a tall guy named Junta Hayami, who claims to be her childhood friend and also attends her high school, shows up at her front door.
4	"The Childhood Friend Is Easy Mode"; Transliteration: "Osananajimi wa Ījī Mōdo!?" (Japanese: 幼なじみはイージーモード!?)	October 27, 2022
Forced to play along, Anzu concludes that Junta has false memories of having a longtime crush on her planted by Riri, who insists that Junta is an easy mode option for completing the real-life dating sim. While walking to school together, Anzu is caught off guard when Junta momentarily finds a Hercules beetle, pictured like a crêpe as a coping mechanism, stuck in her hair. As they encounter Saki on the way, Anzu is surprised that Saki is already acquainted with Junta. Rena tries to exchange contact information with Tsukasa on his new cellphone, but Tsukasa's friend Makoto Oda witnesses when Tsukasa bluntly disregards Rena. Makoto informs Tsukasa that Junta is the star rookie of the high school baseball team, while Junta hears word that Tsukasa is popular and smart. During lunch period, Anzu and Tsukasa mix up their boxed lunches, so they end up eating with Makoto at the courtyard. After school, Tsukasa and Junta eavesdrop on Rena and Yukika interrogating Anzu, who confirms that she is not romantically involved with Tsukasa. However, Anzu refuses to set up Rena with Tsukasa since he is not interested in dating. An eccentric girl, who claims to be Anzu's cousin, suddenly arrives, coercing Rena and Yukika into leaving through overly invasive questions about Rena's bust size. Anzu then realizes that the eccentric girl is none other than Riri assuming the female form named Riri Fushigi.
5	"You're More Troublesome in Flesh and Blood"; Transliteration: "Namami no Kata ga Yakkai ja nē ka" (Japanese: 生身の方が厄介じゃねーか)	October 27, 2022
After Tsukasa thanks Anzu for telling off Rena and Yukika, Riri invites Junta to a dinner party with Anzu and Tsukasa at Anzu's house. Junta brings over fried chicken, but he is despondent upon learning that Tsukasa cooked delicious curry for dinner. When Riri suggests for Junta to also live with Anzu, the latter steals the former's magic wand. Anzu and Riri wrestle over the magic wand until it drops onto dog poo, rendering it temporarily powerless until it is purified again. Junta leaves after he is reassured that Tsukasa is not interested in dating. After learning that it has been a while since Tsukasa had a dinner party, Anzu starts to wonder if Tsukasa has a complicated family relationship. The next day, Anzu and Tsukasa are seen walking to school together, so she spreads a half-truth that she lives very close to him. After school, Anzu returns home alone since Tsukasa has work, so she goes to bed early. An underwear thief breaks into Anzu's house, but he retreats due to her demonic rage. Luckily, Junta was passing by and manages to catch the underwear thief for the police. As Tsukasa leaves work early and accompanies Anzu and Junta back to Anzu's house, Junta receives a call from his mother. After learning that Junta has been given permission by his mother to live with her, Anzu becomes furious upon realizing that Riri has successfully manipulated the events to allow two attractive guys to live with her simultaneously.
6	"A "Reincarnated-in-Another-World" Date"; Transliteration: "Isekai Tensei Dēto ka na!?" (Japanese: 異世界転生デートかな!?)	October 27, 2022
Anzu takes up a part-time job at the convenience store, since Tsukasa has work after school and Junta has baseball practice before school. Tsukasa later invites Anzu to accompany him to a shopping mall. Riri appears in female form, threatening to confiscate all of Anzu's cat-themed clothes if Anzu does not treat the trip to the shopping mall like a date. Anzu is reluctant to wear a cute outfit and don some makeup, which flusters Tsukasa. At the shopping mall, Anzu runs off to use the restroom, leaving Tsukasa by himself. Feeling like he is being eyed by two girls, Tsukasa begins to experience a panic attack until Anzu returns to quell his thoughts. Tsukasa impulsively buys a cat bracelet for Anzu out of gratitude. As they head back home, Junta meets up with them, overwhelmed by Anzu wearing a cute outfit and donning some makeup. That night, Riri feels like Anzu, Tsukasa and Junta have become far too comfortable with their living arrangement, deciding to add one more player for the game. The next day, Anzu oversleeps since her alarm failed to go off. While running late for school, Anzu is almost hit by the car of a wealthy but arrogant guy named Hijiri Koganei, who is driven around by his chauffeur Tsuchiya.
7	"You Sure Have Your Quirks..."; Transliteration: "Kuse ga Tsuyoi njā" (Japanese: クセが強いんじゃぁ)	October 27, 2022
Making up for the trouble, Tsuchiya offers to give Anzu a ride with Hijiri to school, where Tsukasa, Junta, Saki and Makoto express their concerns for her. A few days later, Anzu and Hijiri go to a clothes shop for a beautiful dress before heading to a restaurant for lunch. When Hijiri believes that Anzu staged the car accident as blackmail for a date, Anzu boldly rejects him and walks out of the car, leading Hijiri to feel heartbroken for the first time. Anzu later returns the dress to Hijiri after having it dry-cleaned. Hijiri pays a visit to Anzu's house, where he offers to fulfill her three greatest desires by gifting her with video games, chocolates and cats in front of Riri and Junta. Riri would allow this if Anzu willingly dates Hijiri, but Anzu unexpectedly rejects the gifts, seeing them as meaningless if Hijiri has not earned the money through hard work. At the convenience store, Anzu is shocked to find Hijiri as a newly hired part-time employee. Much to Anzu's surprise, Hijiri actually excels at customer service. After her work shift, Anzu learns from Tsuchiya that Hijiri developed a tsundere personality ever since she rejected him. Having received their paychecks, Hijiri offer to buy Anzu a gift, so she opts for eating cheap ice pops at the playground. Their moment almost sparks romance until Anzu slaps herself back to sanity. As Anzu returns home, she finds Tsukasa's cellphone, which recently received a text message from a woman.
8	"Goose Bumps! I Am a Goose Now"; Transliteration: "Torihada!! Ai Amu a Bādo" (Japanese: 鳥肌!! アイ アム ア バード)	October 27, 2022
During the weekend, Anzu is stunned when she chances upon the woman in question, who turns out to be Arisa Kazuki, Tsukasa's older sister. Anzu realizes that Tsukasa has been living with her for a month already. Although Tsukasa previously lived alone in an apartment due to having a bad father, Arisa is happy now that Tsukasa is more like his old self because he has been staying with Anzu. Arisa convinces Tsukasa to continue rooming with Anzu indefinitely. A few days later, Riri decides to do more research on romance by assuming a male form named Rio Fushigi, bribing Anzu to go on a mock date with the reward of cat hooded pajamas. At the movie theater, Tsukasa and Makoto see Anzu and Rio holding hands, but Rio simply claims to be Anzu's other cousin and Riri's twin brother. After watching a romance film that is a real tearjerker, Anzu and Rio drink some bubble tea, though soon encountering Hijiri and Tsuchiya. Rio tries to provokes Hijiri by sparking a love rivalry. Anzu angrily drags away Rio to continue their mock date, visiting a photo booth, a claw machine and a gift shop. Having gathered enough research on romance for another scenario, Rio playfully kisses Anzu on the cheek on their walk back home. An embarrassed Anzu realizes that Junta was traumatized upon seeing this happen nearby.
9	"Ginger Ale Is a Force Majeure"; Transliteration: "Jinjāēru wa Fukakōryoku da" (Japanese: ジンジャーエールは不可抗力だ)	October 27, 2022
On the subway, Anzu encounters her childhood friends named Amin and Riporin before hanging out at a restaurant called Zarigaria. From their conversation, Anzu realizes that Junta used to be nicknamed "Tonta", meaning that Junta is genuinely her childhood friend. Junta was just unrecognizable to Anzu because he has drastically changed in appearance over the years. Amin and Riporin invite Anzu and Junta to an upcoming class reunion. At home, Riri confirms that Junta truly had a longtime crush on Anzu, though Riri did arrange for Anzu and Junta to meet again after so many years apart. Anzu attends the class reunion at a family entertainment center, where a boy named Ryuya, who is also Anzu's childhood friend, insists on a battle of the sexes with punishments for the losers. However, Ryuya loses against Anzu in bowling and air hockey, in which the boys are forced to reveal their first crushes and buy ice cream for the girls. Junta later arrives when the boys and girls take a break in the karaoke box. Seeing that Junta has become a handsome athlete, Ryuya bitterly storms outside the karaoke box, though Anzu manages to catch up to Ryuya. Anzu bluntly rejects Ryuya when he reveals that she was his real first crush. Amin and Riporin restrain Junta as they eavesdrop on Anzu blatantly stating that Junta would not be interested in her anyways. Later on, Ryuya apologetically admits that he caused Junta to drift apart from Anzu in the past.
10	"Other Way Around, Dummy"; Transliteration: "Gyaku ja Boke" (Japanese: 逆じゃボケ～)	October 27, 2022
While planning to sleep over at Anzu's house, Saki soon discovers that Tsukasa and Junta have been living with Anzu. It turns out that Saki was kicked out of her house when her father went to work a graveyard shift while her older brother invited some friends over for a party. While considering to tell Saki about the existence of Riri, Anzu is struck by an urgent need to use the restroom. Riri confirms that Anzu's stomach distress was punishment for attempting a breach of contract. In the past, Anzu first befriended Saki in middle school after defending her from a girl who purposely knocked into her. When Saki started dating an upperclassman named Mori, she slapped him with a textbook when he tried to molest her during a tutoring session. Anzu then publicly exposed Mori for spreading a false rumor about Saki. In the present, Riri in female form encourages Anzu, Tsukasa, Junta and Saki to attend the summer festival in yukata attire. They encounter Ryuya, who privately advises Junta to confesses his feelings for Anzu before he misses his chance. Saki is traumatized upon seeing Mori, but Makoto rescues her from an uncomfortable setting. Anzu and Tsukasa watch the fireworks as Hijiri and Tsuchiya show up later. Meanwhile, a mysterious woman finds a selfie posted on social media by two girls who saw Anzu and Tsukasa watching the fireworks in the background.
11	"Just Tell Me If You Don't Like It"; Transliteration: "Iya dattara Itte" (Japanese: イヤだったら言って)	October 27, 2022
After hanging out with Hijiri and Tsuchiya at the amusement arcade, Anzu walks back home, where she is approached by the mysterious woman, introduced as Yukana Kishi, who claims to be Tsukasa's girlfriend. Growing suspicious as she witnesses Tsukasa suffering a panic attack from a distance, Anzu urges Yukana to leave, while Tsukasa confirms that Yukana is his stalker. In the past, Tsukasa kindly retrieved Yukana's purse after she tripped and fell in the street. He received several packages from Yukana, which were delivered under his mother's name, and his father accused him of pulling a prank. Yukana even posed as Tsukasa's girlfriend on social media against his will and ruined his reputation. Thanks to his mother and Arisa, Tsukasa rented an apartment and transfer schools. In the present, Arisa temporarily moves in with Tsukasa at Anzu's house. After a work shift with Hijiri, Anzu is attacked in an alley by two thugs blackmailed by Yukana. Anzu is collectively saved by Junta, Ryuya, Tsuchiya and Saki's brother, all of whom responded to text messages from Anzu's cellphone. At Anzu's house, Riri in male form confirms to sending those text messages. When Riri considers removing Tsukasa from the list of candidates since it would impose danger, Anzu chucks Riri's magic wand onto dog poo again. Tsukasa learns that Junta started playing baseball because Anzu once said that she was attracted to athletic guys. After another work shift with Hijiri, Anzu is attacked outside by Yukana wielding a knife.
12	"Last Story!?"; Transliteration: "Rasuto Sutōrī!?" (Japanese: ラスト・ストーリー!?)	October 27, 2022
When Tsukasa witnesses Anzu bleeding from her forehead, he finally overcomes his fear and decries Yukana for her actions. Thanks to Arisa, Yukana is arrested by the police, while Anzu is bandaged up at the hospital. Tsukasa's father still blames Tsukasa for what has conspired, but Anzu stands up to Tsukasa's father. As Anzu takes Tsukasa back to her house, he embraces her after recounting all the times that she discreetly saved him. Anzu's mother Miyoko Hoshino finally returns home. Hijiri uses his family connections to ensure that Yukana will be imprisoned for her crimes. At night, Riri in female form menacingly visits Yukana in her prison cell. Riri in male form then appears in Anzu's bedroom, confessing love for Anzu and kissing her on the forehead before vanishing. Anzu, Tsukasa and Miyoko are relieved to learn from Arisa that Yukana recently suffered a severe case of amnesia, having no recollection of Tsukasa. Anzu's father finally returns home, surprising Anzu with her three greatest desires. In the living room, Anzu meets a wizard named Kate, who was assigned to replace Riri. However, Kate forgot to cast an illusion spell to appear invisible to Tsukasa and Junta when they enter the living room. Coming clean, Kate reveals that Riri has been exiled from the human world for using taboo magic on Yukana and developing feelings for Anzu. Threatening to flush Kate's magic wand down the toilet, Anzu convinces Kate to summon Riri in male form. Anzu thanks Riri for improving her life, though Riri admittedly wants to stay with Anzu. Finding a loophole in the laws of potential romance, Anzu declares that there is a minuscule chance that she could fall in love with Riri in male form, which allows Riri to stay by her side. Anzu's parents return to the United States, while Tsukasa and Junta continue living with Anzu. Riri in female form announces that Anzu must choose a boyfriend before graduating high school or else she will permanently lose her three greatest desires, so Anzu insists that she will neither be forced into love nor let that happen on her watch. Kate is reassigned to Yukana, seemingly at a psychiatric hospital. Riri ends the episode on a cliffhanger.

=== Live-action film ===
In June 2025, a live-action film adaptation produced by Toho Studios and Dub was announced, with Tsutomu Hanabusa serving as the director and Junpei Yamaoka writing the script. Toho released the film in Japan on December 12, 2025. Three theme songs were used in the film: "Never Romantic" performed by Naniwa Danshi, "True Love" performed by INI, and "Zutto Zutto" (ずっとずっと) performed by Fantastics from Exile Tribe.

== Reception ==
The series was the first-place winner of the second of Shueisha's Jump Vertical Scrolling Manga Awards. In 2020, the series ranked 12th in the Next Manga Awards in the web manga category.
