= Kyohei Takahashi =

Japanese idol, singer and actor (born 2000)

- 高橋 恭平
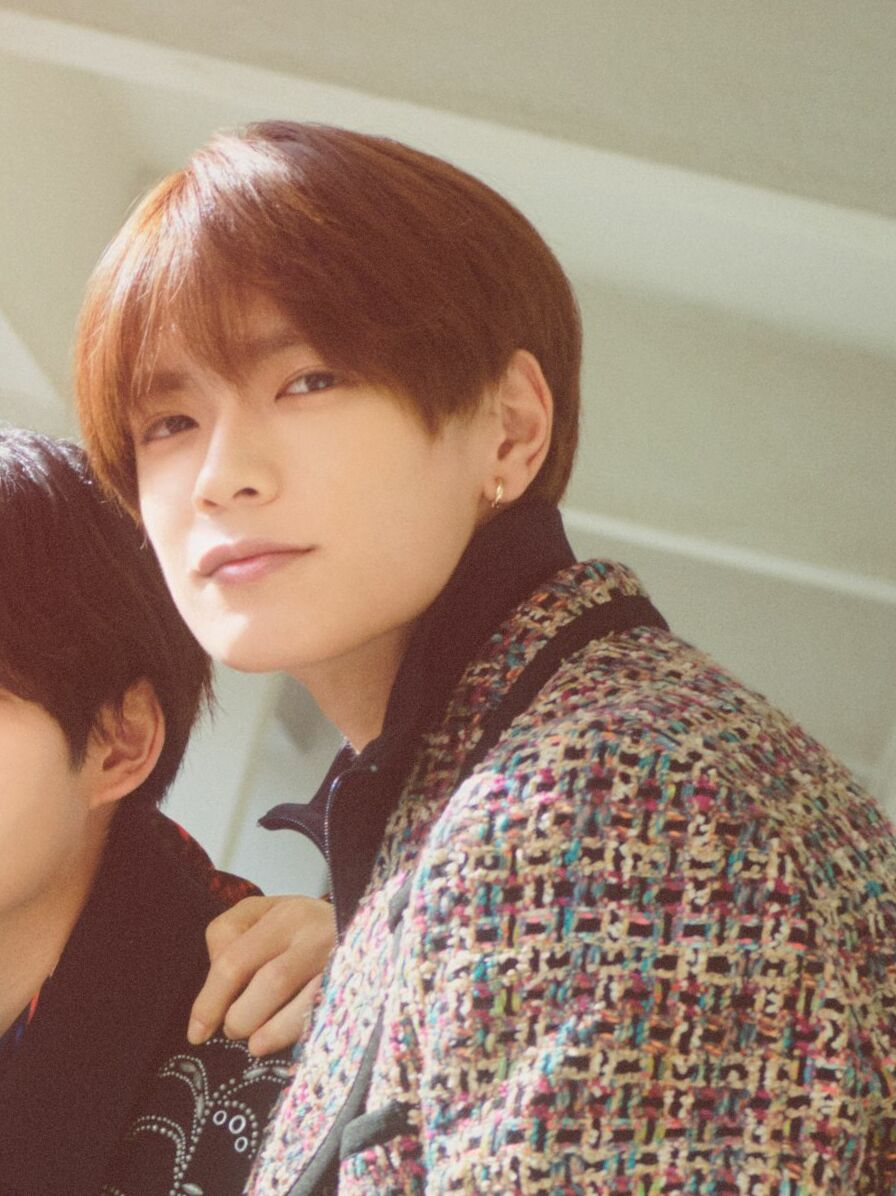
- Takahashi in 2023
- Born: February 28, 2000 (age 26); Osaka Prefecture, Japan
- Occupations: Idol; actor; singer
- Years active: 2014–present
- Agent: Starto Entertainment
- Known for: Member of Naniwa Danshi
- Musical career
- Genres: J-pop
- Label: Storm Labels
- Member of: Naniwa Danshi

Kyohei Takahashi (高橋 恭平, Takahashi Kyōhei, born February 28, 2000) is a Japanese idol, actor, and singer. He is a member of the boy band Naniwa Danshi, formed under Starto Entertainment.

== Early life ==
Takahashi played basketball during his elementary and junior high school years, but retired from the sport in his third year of junior high school.

After seeing this, his older sister decided to submit his application to the agency, believing he should pursue another path. Although he was not informed about the audition until the day before and initially refused to attend, he ultimately participated at her insistence and successfully passed.

He joined the agency on November 23, 2014, alongside future Naniwa Danshi members Shunsuke Michieda and Kento Nagao.

== Career ==
In October 2018, he was selected as a member of Naniwa Danshi, a Kansai Johnny's Jr. unit, which significantly raised his public profile.

The following year, he made his acting debut in the television drama special Kizuna no Pedal, broadcast as part of the 24 Hour Television: Love Saves The Earth in August 2019.

He officially debuted as a member of Naniwa Danshi on November 12, 2021, with the single "Ubu Love", marking his transition from a junior talent to a major-label artist.

In March 2023, Takahashi took on his first leading role in the film And Yet, You Are So Sweet (Naniwa Chigira-kun ga Amasugiru.), further establishing his presence as an actor.

In February 2026, he launched his official Instagram account, expanding his activities into social media.

== Awards ==
- 2019 – Best Jeanist Award (4th place)
- 2020 – Best Jeanist Award (3rd place)
- 2025 – Fragrance Person of the Year

== Filmography ==
=== Television ===
Year	Title	Role	Notes	Ref.
2019	Kizuna no Pedal	Takashi Miyazawa (younger)	Television special	
2020	Toshishita Kareshi (Ep. 13)	Ayumu Kudo	Lead role	
2020	Seiho Boys' High School!	Rui Kamiki	Lead role	
2021	Jimoto ni Kaerenai Wake Ari Danshi no 14 no Jijō (Ep. 8)	Wataru	Lead role	
2023	My Home Hero	Kyoichi Majima		
2025	Mr. Mikami's Classroom	Itsuki Tokura		
2025	Creator Dragon – "Midnight Office Romance"	Himself	Lead role	
2025–2026	Strobe Edge	Ren Ichinose	Lead role; Season 1–2	

=== Film ===
Year	Title	Role	Notes	Ref.
2022	BL Metamorphosis	Tsumugi Kawamura		
2023	And Yet, You Are So Sweet	Sui Chigira	Lead role	
2024	My Home Hero	Kyoichi Majima		
2025	Romantic Killer	Tsukasa Kazuki	Lead role	
2026	Yamaguchi-kun Isn't So Bad	Asuka Yamaguchi	Lead role	
2026	Blue Lock	Hyoma Chigiri		

=== Stage ===
Year	Title	Role	Notes	Ref.
2015	Boys: Dream of The World...Children Who Don't Know War			
2016	Another & Summer Show			
2016	Johnny's Future World			
2017	Boys: Snow Falls on a Southern Island			
2018	Boys: Running Through Tomorrow			
