= Daigo Nishihata =

Japanese actor and singer (born 1997)

- 西畑 大吾
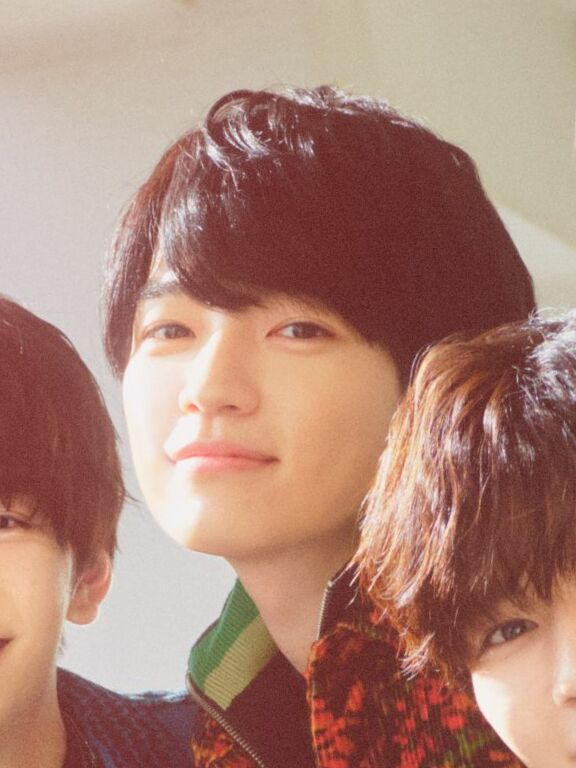
- Nishihata in 2023
- Born: January 9, 1997 (age 29); Osaka Prefecture, Japan
- Occupations: Idol; actor; television personality
- Years active: 2011–present
- Agent: Starto Entertainment
- Known for: Member of Naniwa Danshi
- Musical career
- Genres: J-pop
- Label: Storm Labels
- Member of: Naniwa Danshi
- Website: Naniwa Danshi (Storm Labels); Naniwa Danshi (Starto Entertainment)

Daigo Nishihata (西畑 大吾, born January 9, 1997) is a Japanese idol and actor. He is a member of the Japanese boy band Naniwa Danshi. Nishihata joined Johnny & Associates in 2011 and later became a member of the Kansai Johnny's Jr. unit Naniwa Ōji. In 2018 he was selected as a member of Naniwa Danshi, which made its CD debut in 2021 with the single "Ubu Love".

== Early life and career ==
Nishihata was born on January 9, 1997, in Osaka Prefecture, Japan. Nishihata auditioned at Osaka-jō Hall during Tomohisa Yamashita's Asia tour "TOMOHISA YAMASHITA ASIA TOUR 2011 SUPER GOOD SUPER BAD" and joined Johnny & Associates on April 3, 2011. He later performed as a member of the Kansai Johnny's Jr. unit Aぇ少年. On the same day, Ren Nagase and Yoshinori Masakado also joined the agency. The three later became known as close contemporaries.

In 2012 he became a member of the Kansai Johnny's Jr. unit Naniwa Ōji together with Ryūsei Ōnishi and Ren Nagase.

Nishihata made his television drama debut in the NHK asadora Gochisōsan (2013–2014). He later appeared in another NHK asadora, Asa ga Kita (2015–2016).

In 2018 he was selected as a member of the Kansai-based idol group Naniwa Danshi. The group officially debuted on November 12, 2021, with the single "Ubu Love".

== Acting career ==
Nishihata has cited actor and singer Kazunari Ninomiya as one of his major influences. He became interested in Ninomiya after watching the television dramas Yamada Tarō Monogatari and Ryūsei no Kizuna.

He later appeared with Ninomiya in the film Last Recipe (2017) and co-starred with him in a commercial for the Nisshin Oillio Group "Fresh Oil Series".

In addition to his music activities, Nishihata has appeared in numerous television dramas and films. He has appeared in television dramas such as Bokura wa Kiseki de Dekiteiru (2018), Kyojo (2020), Kotaro Lives Alone (2021), and Shin Nobunaga Koki (2022).

In 2023 he starred in the horror film Immersion, directed by Takashi Shimizu.

He also appeared in the anthology television program Tales of the Unusual in 2023.

In 2026, Nishihata took his first solo leading role in a television drama in Matori to Kyōken.

== Awards ==
- 2025 – 28th Nikkan Sports Drama Grand Prix – Best Supporting Actor (Winter) for Ozoshi ni Koi wa Muzukashii

== Filmography ==
=== Film ===
Year	Title	Role	Notes	Ref.
2017	Policeman and Me	Jiro Nagakura		
2017	Last Recipe	Shotaro Kamata		
2022	Kappei	Keita Iruma		
2023	Immersion	Tomohiko Kataoka	Lead role	
2024	Doctor X: Final	Ren Higashimura		
2026	Part-time Death Angel	Shinji Sakura	Lead role	

=== Television ===
Year	Title	Role	Notes	Ref.
2013–2014	Bon Appetit!	Katsuo Nishikado	Asadora	
2016	Here Comes Asa!	Yōnosuke Mayama	Asadora	
2018	Bokura wa Kiseki de Dekiteiru	Ryutaro Shinjo		
2020	Kyojo	Takumi Kashimura	Television special	
2021	Kotaro Lives Alone	Keisuke Hanawa		
2022	New Nobunaga Chronicle: High School Is a Battlefield	Hideyoshi Toyotomi		
2023	Tales of the Unusual	Takuya Nanjo	Segment: "Niji"; lead role	
2023	Knockin' on Locked Door	Himura Katana	Lead role	
2025	Shin Abarenbō Shōgun	Tokugawa Ieshige	Television special	
2026–	Matori to Kyōken	Kyōnosuke Umezawa	Lead role	

=== Web series ===
Year	Title	Role	Notes	Ref.
2021	Hanawa-sensei wa Hanninmae!?	Keisuke Hanawa	Lead role	
