= Kento Nagao =

Japanese actor and singer (born 2002)

- 長尾 謙杜
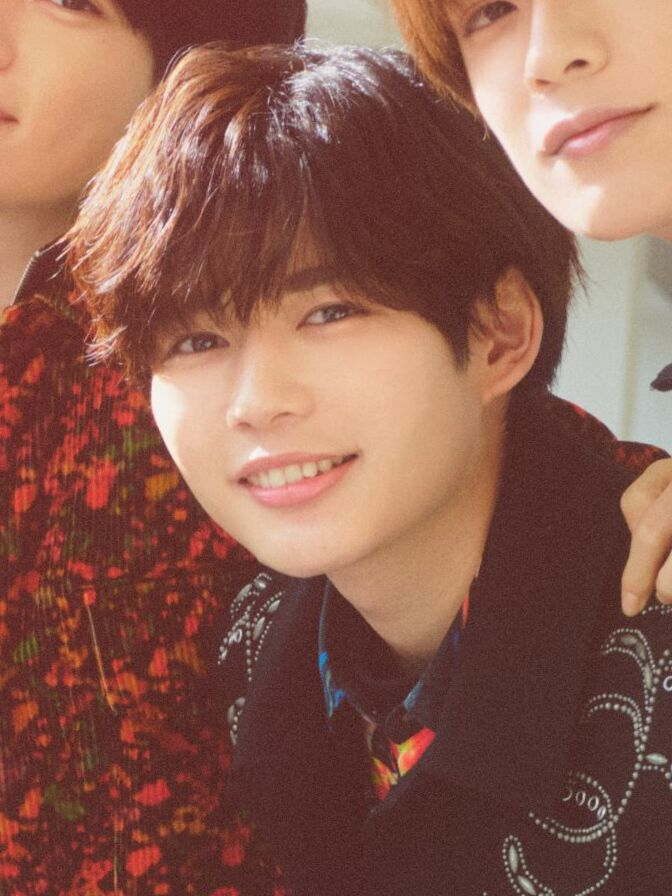
- Nagao in 2023
- Born: August 15, 2002 (age 23); Osaka Prefecture, Japan
- Occupations: Idol; actor; singer
- Years active: 2014–present
- Agent: Starto Entertainment
- Known for: Member of Naniwa Danshi
- Musical career
- Genres: J-pop
- Label: Storm Labels
- Member of: Naniwa Danshi

Kento Nagao (長尾 謙杜, Nagao Kento, born August 15, 2002) is a Japanese idol, actor, and singer. He is a member of the Japanese boy band Naniwa Danshi. Born in Osaka Prefecture, he is affiliated with Starto Entertainment.

== Early life ==
Kento Nagao was born on August 15, 2002, in Osaka Prefecture, Japan. He was scouted as a child actor at the age of three and entered the entertainment industry with his mother's consent. He attended an acting school where actress Mana Ashida was also enrolled. At around the age of eight, he appeared in a television commercial for the Osaka Aquarium Kaiyukan, playing an elementary school student who asks, "Can penguins fly in the sky?"

In his final year of elementary school, Nagao applied to join Johnny & Associates and officially joined the agency on November 23, 2014.

== Career ==
Nagao began his career as a child actor and model. He later joined Kansai Johnny's Jr. and first appeared on stage in the concert Spring Vacation Special Show 2015 at the Osaka Shochikuza.

In 2018, he was selected as a founding member of the Kansai Johnny's Jr. group Naniwa Danshi.

He made his television drama debut in 2019 in Ore no Sukāto, Doko Itta?.

In the same year, Nagao contributed to costume design for the stage production Boys in the Light of Youth.... He also designed costumes for Naniwa Danshi's original song "Aoharu: With U With Me".

In 2021, Naniwa Danshi made their CD debut with the single Ubu Love.

In 2022, he appeared in television dramas such as Tonari no Chikara and Papa to Musume no Nanokakan, and starred in the Amazon Original film Homestay, marking his first film leading role.

In 2023, he appeared in the NHK taiga drama What Will You Do, Ieyasu? and portrayed the younger version of the protagonist in the film Kishibe Rohan Louvre e Iku. He also starred in the spin-off drama Joō-sama ni Sasagu Kusuriyubi.

In 2025, he appeared in the film Muromachi Outsiders and played his first leading role in a theatrical film in Oishikute Naku Toki.

On August 15, 2024, Nagao opened his official Instagram account.

== Filmography ==
=== Television ===
Year	Title	Role	Notes	Ref.
2018	Shirube e no Michi (Jr. Senbatsu! Shirube e no Michi)	Various roles	Episode segments	
2019	Ore no Sukāto, Doko Itta?	Yuma Wakabayashi		
2020	Toshishita Kareshi	Asahi Yamamura	Episode 7; lead role	
2020	Seiho Boys' High School!	Mamoru Hanai	Lead role (with Naniwa Danshi)	
2022	My Neighbor, Chikara	Takuya Kashiwagi		
2022	Seven Days of a Daddy and a Daughter	Kenta Osugi		
2023	Kissing the Ring Finger	Riku Hada		
2023	What Will You Do, Ieyasu?	Hisamatsu Genzaburō Katsutoshi	Taiga drama	

=== Web series ===
Year	Title	Role	Notes	Ref.
2023	Joō-sama ni Sasagu Kusuriyubi	Riku Hada	Lead role; Paravi spin-off	

=== Film ===
Year	Title	Role	Notes	Ref.
2017	Kansai Johnny's Jr. no Owarai Star Tanjō!	Jun Inage		
2022	Homestay	Shiro / Makoto Kobayashi	Lead role	
2023	Rohan at the Louvre	Rohan Kishibe (young)		
2025	Muromachi Outsiders	Saizō		
2025	Taste and Tears	Shinya Kazama	Lead role	
2025	Not Me That Went Viral	Ao Aoe		
2025	The Sickness Unto Love	Nozomu Miyamine	Lead role	
2026	Samurai Vengeance	Kikunosuke Inō		

=== Stage ===
Year	Title	Role	Notes	Ref.
2018	Chibikko Owarai Shichihenge Shōnen KABUKI	Heibei	Lead role (with Shunsuke Michieda)	
2021	Aoki-san Chi no Okusan			

== Awards ==
- 2023 – ViVi National Treasure Handsome Ranking (NEXT category), 1st place
- 2025 – Sneaker Best Dresser Award – Icon of the Year
