= Joichiro Fujiwara =

Japanese singer, actor, television personality (born 1996)

- 藤原 丈一郎
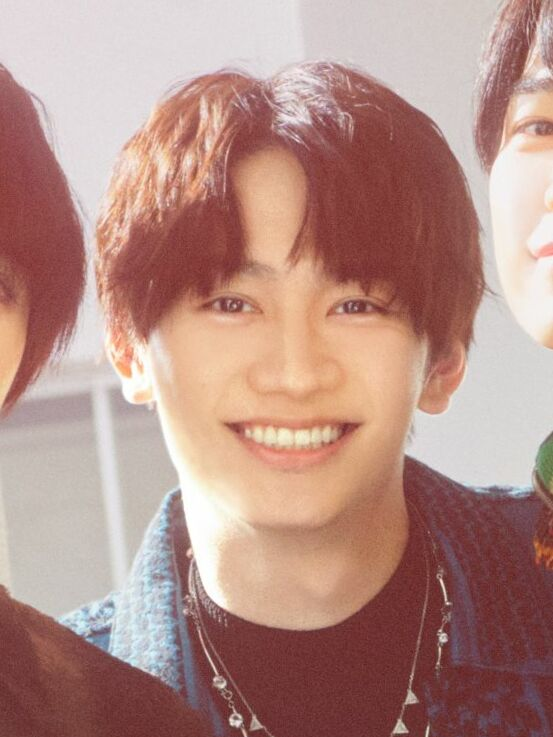
- Fujiwara in 2023
- Born: February 8, 1996 (age 30); Ikeda, Osaka, Japan
- Occupations: singer, actor, television personality
- Years active: 2004–present
- Agent: Starto Entertainment
- Known for: Member of Naniwa Danshi
- Musical career
- Genres: J-pop
- Label: Storm Labels
- Member of: Naniwa Danshi

Joichiro Fujiwara (藤原 丈一郎, Fujiwara Jōichirō, born February 8, 1996) is a Japanese singer, actor, and television personality. He is a member of the idol group Naniwa Danshi, formed under Starto Entertainment.

== Early life ==
Fujiwara was born in Ikeda, Osaka Prefecture, Japan. He joined Johnny & Associates on February 21, 2004, at the age of eight, after participating in an audition event held at Kyocera Dome Osaka. Initially entering the baseball division due to his interest in the sport, he later joined the dance division and was accepted into the agency.

He became one of the youngest members of Kansai Johnny's Jr. at the time and began appearing in stage performances and concerts shortly thereafter.

== Career ==
=== 2004–2021: Kansai Johnny's Jr. ===
Following his entry into the agency, Fujiwara was active as a member of Kansai Johnny's Jr. He participated in various stage productions and was also part of junior groups such as Little Gangs and Gang Star.

In 2018, he was selected as a member of Naniwa Danshi.

In addition to his idol activities, he also worked as a voice actor for the virtual idol character Kaido Asuka beginning in 2019.

=== 2021–present: Debut with Naniwa Danshi ===
Fujiwara officially debuted as a member of Naniwa Danshi on November 12, 2021, with the single "Ubu Love".

His trainee period lasted approximately 17 years and 9 months, surpassing the previous record within the agency and becoming the longest pre-debut period for a debuted member.

In 2025, he was cast in his first leading role in a terrestrial television drama, Laundering.

== Personal life ==
Fujiwara is sometimes nicknamed "Jō". He is known for his strong passion for baseball and is a devoted fan of the Orix Buffaloes. He has appeared on several baseball-related programs and has served as a ceremonial first pitcher at Orix games multiple times.

== Filmography ==
=== Television dramas ===
Year	Title	Role	Notes	Ref.
2020	Seiho Boys' High School!	Genba Shin	Lead (as part of Naniwa Danshi)	
2022	Keshigomu wo Kureta Joshi wo Suki ni Natta	Kazuki Itakura		
2023	Pending Train	Daichi Yonezawa		
2023	My Second Aoharu	Motivated job applicant		
2024	Koisuru Keigo 24ji	Minato Hara		
2024	Tokyo Live Drama: 24 Hours – Starting Over	Yuki Yazaki	Lead (with Honami Suzuki and Matsuya Onoe)	
2025	My Calculated Ex-Girlfriend	Takumi Sakashita	Lead	
2025	Laundering	Eisuke Hiyama	Lead	
2025	Subete no Koi ga Owaru Toshitemo	Hayate Nishi		

=== Films ===
Year	Title	Role	Notes	Ref.
2023	Analog	Hiroya Shimada		
2025	Romantic Killer	Unknown SAT member		

=== Animated films ===
Year	Title	Role	Notes	Ref.
2020	HoneyWorks 10th Anniversary "LIP×LIP FILM×LIVE"	Kaido Asuka		
2024	Nintama Rantaro the Movie: Dokutake Ninja-tai Saikyo no Gunshi	Kanbei Wakaoji		

=== Stage ===
Year	Title	Role	Notes	Ref.
2008	Dream Boys			
2015	Boys: Dream of The World...Children Who Don't Know War			
2016	Netorare Sosuke	Jimmy		
2017	Boys: Snow Falls on a Southern Island			
2018	Boys: Running Through Tomorrow			
2018–2019	Ryune: The Sword of Wind and Destruction	Ryune Flow	Lead	
2020	Aoki-san Chi no Okusan			
