= Kazuya Ohashi =

Japanese idol, singer and actor (born 1997)

- 大橋 和也
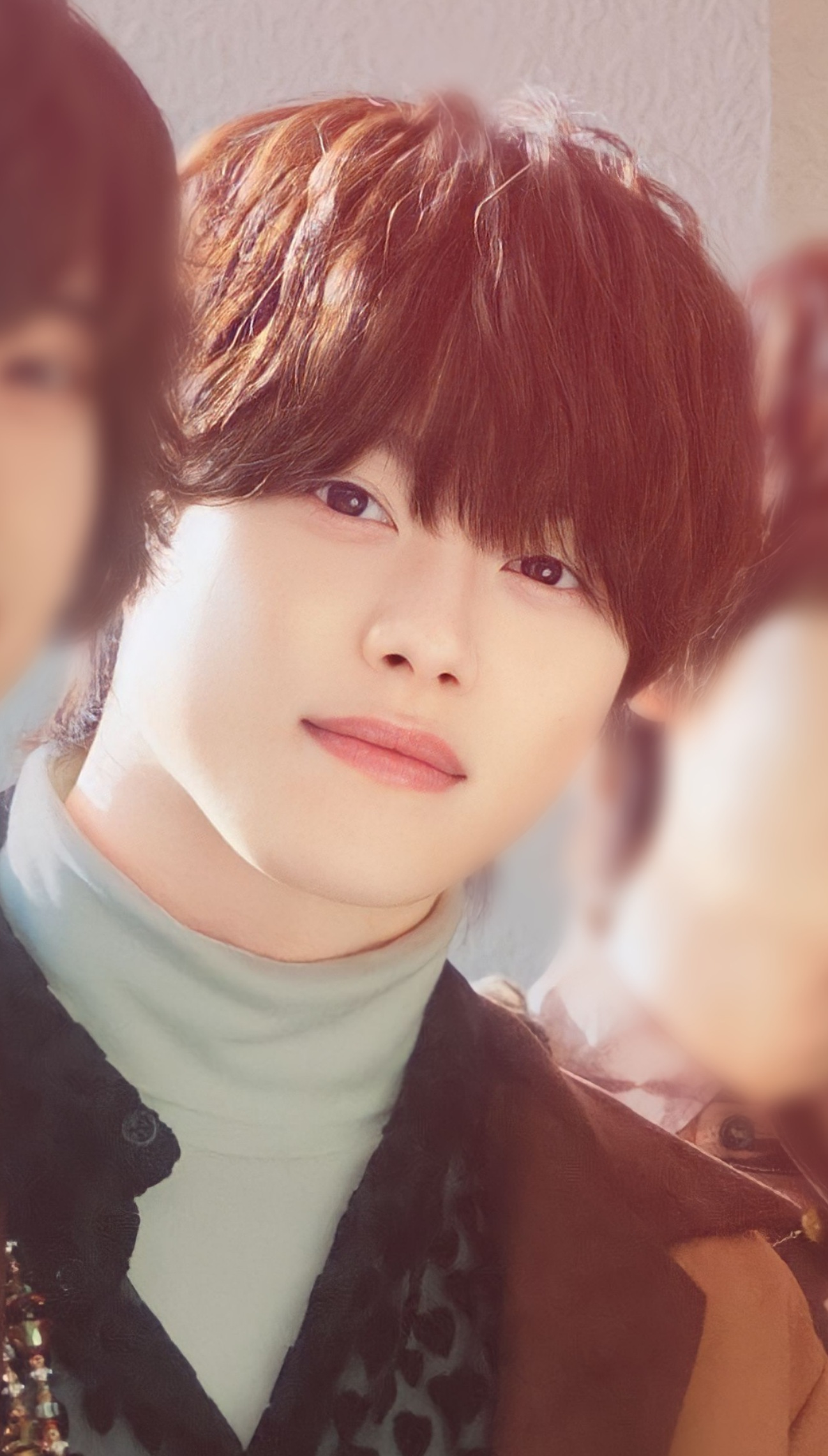
- Ohashi in 2023
- Born: August 9, 1997 (age 29); Koga, Fukuoka, Japan
- Occupations: Idol, singer, actor
- Years active: 2009–present
- Agent: Starto Entertainment
- Known for: Member of Naniwa Danshi
- Musical career
- Genre: J-pop
- Label: Storm Labels
- Member of: Naniwa Danshi

Kazuya Ohashi (大橋 和也, Ohashi Kazuya, born August 9, 1997) is a Japanese idol, singer, and actor. He is a member and leader of the boy band Naniwa Danshi.

== Early life ==
Ohashi was born in Koga, Fukuoka, Japan, and moved to Osaka at the age of three. He began dancing in elementary school and entered the entertainment industry at a young age. During his elementary school years, Ohashi was a member of an a cappella group and appeared on a television singing program, demonstrating his early interest in music. In 2009, he joined Johnny & Associates as a trainee (Kansai Johnny's Jr.).

== Career ==
=== Early career and Naniwa Danshi ===
Ohashi was active as a member of Kansai trainee (Johnny's Jr.), appearing in stage productions and variety programs. Before his debut, he spent over a decade as a trainee, during which he sometimes performed as a backup dancer despite training junior members. He later recalled the difficulties of this time and said he was moved to tears when his debut was announced. In 2018, he was selected as a member of Naniwa Danshi, which made its CD debut in 2021.

=== Acting career ===
In 2022, Ohashi starred in the Nippon TV drama Keshigomu o Kureta Joshi o Suki ni Natta ("I Fell in Love with the Girl Who Gave Me an Eraser"), marking his first solo leading role in a television series. The series depicts a 13-year unrequited love story spanning from middle school to adulthood.

In 2025, he starred in the TV Asahi drama Revenge Spy, an original spy romantic comedy in which he played Yuga Sugawara, a spy seeking revenge for his brother's death. The role highlighted his ability to portray both comedic and serious aspects of a character.

In the same year, Ohashi co-starred in the film My Special One, based on a popular manga by Momoko Koda, marking his first leading role in a feature film. He portrayed Kota Kirigaya, the leader of a national idol group.

Following the film's release, the story was adapted into a television drama series, with Ohashi reprising his role and continuing the narrative beyond the film.

== Personal life ==
Ohashi is known for his interest in cooking and food, which he has frequently mentioned in interviews.

== Public image ==
Ohashi is known for his bright and energetic personality and is regarded as a positive presence within Naniwa Danshi. He has also been noted for his leadership as the group's leader. He is also recognized for a humorous self-introduction referencing pudding, which he adopted early in his career to make himself more memorable.

== Filmography ==
=== Television ===
Year	Title	Role	Notes	Ref.
2020	Seiho Boys' High School!	Ichiro Fujiki	Lead role	
2022	Keshigomu o Kureta Joshi o Suki ni Natta	Yu Fukuda	Lead role	
2024	Tamiō R	Ichirota Tanakamaru		
2025	Revenge Spy	Yuga Sugawara	Lead role	

=== Film ===
Year	Title	Role	Notes	Ref.
2016	Kansai Johnny's Jr. no Mezase Dream Stage!	Toshi Watanabe		
2024	Fushigi Dagashiya Zenitendō	Kotaro Todoroki		
2025	My Special One	Kota Kirigaya	Lead role	
2026	Finding My Punchline	Ishikawa	Lead role	
2027	Anisong Boys	Ryuto Usami	Lead role	

=== Anime films ===
Year	Title	Role	Notes	Ref.
2020	HoneyWorks 10th Anniversary Lip×Lip Film×Live	Aisome Sora	Voice role	

=== Stage ===
Year	Title	Role	Notes	Ref.
2015	Boys: Dream of The World...Children Who Don't Know War			
2016	Another & Summer Show			
2017	Gin Nikan			
2017	Boys: Snow Falls on a Southern Island			
2018–2019	Ryuun: Kaze no Mahō to Horobi no Tsurugi		Lead role	
2018	Boys: Running Through Tomorrow			
2020	Aoki-san Chi no Okusan			
2026	AmberS		Lead role	

== Awards ==
Year	Award	Category	Result	Ref.
2025	anan Award	Super Idol Category	Won	
