= Ryusei Onishi =

Japanese idol, singer and actor (born 2001)

- 大西 流星
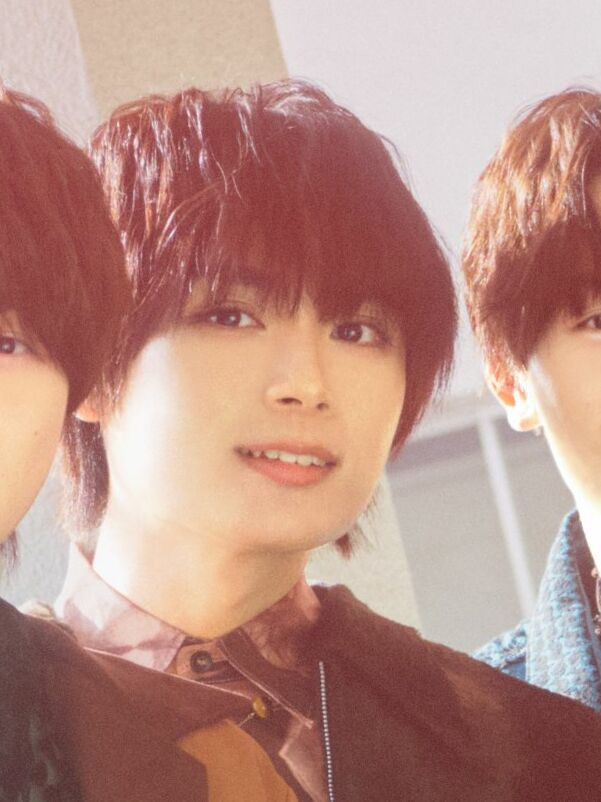
- Onishi in 2023
- Born: August 7, 2001 (age 25); Hyōgo Prefecture, Japan
- Occupations: Idol; actor; singer
- Years active: 2012–present
- Agent: Starto Entertainment
- Known for: Member of Naniwa Danshi
- Musical career
- Genre: J-pop
- Label: Storm Labels
- Member of: Naniwa Danshi

Ryusei Onishi (大西 流星, Onishi Ryusei, born August 7, 2001) is a Japanese idol, actor, and singer. He is a member of the Japanese boy band Naniwa Danshi.

He joined Johnny & Associates as a trainee (Johnny's Jr.) in 2012, became a member of Naniwa Danshi when the group was formed in 2018, and made his CD debut with the group in 2021 with the single "Ubu Love".

== Early life ==
Onishi was born on August 7, 2001, in Hyōgo Prefecture, Japan. He joined Johnny & Associates in 2012, at the age of ten, after being inspired to pursue a career in entertainment.

Before entering the agency, he had studied dance from the age of five.

== Career ==
Shortly after joining the agency, Onishi became a member of the Kansai Johnny's Jr. unit Naniwa Oji.

In 2018, he was selected as a member of Naniwa Danshi. The group made its CD debut on November 12, 2021, with the single "Ubu Love".

In 2022, Onishi produced a collaborative cosmetics line with the brand Ettusais, reportedly becoming the first talent from his agency to do so.

As an actor, Onishi appeared in the television drama Starman: Kono Hoshi no Koi (2013), and later starred in Muchuu sa, Kimi ni. (2021) as Miyoshi Hayashi.

He went on to take leading roles in Kanojo, Okarishimasu (2022) and Benisasu Life (2023), the latter of which featured him as Masato Hojo, a university student who aspires to launch a cosmetics brand, reflecting Onishi's own interest in beauty and makeup.

In film, he appeared in Ninjani Sanjo! Mirai e no Tatakai (2014), Shonentachi (2019), The Good Father (2022), and My Happy Marriage (2023). In 2024, he played Eiji Aihara in We Don't Know Love Yet, his first starring role in a feature film.

Outside of entertainment, he served as a member of an advisory panel for Expo 2025 Osaka, Kansai.

== Public image ==
Onishi is known for his interest in beauty and cosmetics, which has been reflected in his work, including producing a cosmetics collaboration. He has also been noted for his enthusiasm for railways, particularly the Shinkansen. His interest in railways has led to collaborations with railway-related campaigns, including a promotional project with JR Central.

== Filmography ==
=== Television ===
Year	Title	Role	Notes	Ref.
2013	Starman: Kono Hoshi no Koi	Dai Uno		
2020	Toshishita Kareshi	Takumi / Daichi Yano		
2020	Seiho Boys' High School!	Ten Momoi		
2021	Muchuu sa, Kimi ni.	Miyoshi Hayashi	Lead role	
2022	Rokuhodo Yotsuiro Biyori	Tsubaki Nakao		
2022	Rent-A-Girlfriend	Kazuya Kinoshita	Lead role	
2023	Benisasu Life	Masato Hojo	Lead role	
2027	Bless	Aia Udagawa	Lead role	

=== Film ===
Year	Title	Role	Notes	Ref.
2014	Ninjani Sanjo! Mirai e no Tatakai			
2019	Shonentachi			
2022	The Good Father	Jun Yotsui		
2023	As Long as We Both Shall Live	Prince Takaihito		
2024	We Don't Know Love Yet	Eiji Aihara	Lead role	
2024	Nintama Rantaro the Movie: Dokutake Ninja-tai Saikyo no Gunshi	Seiemon Sakuragi	Voice role	

=== Stage ===
Year	Title	Role	Notes	Ref.
2015	Boys: Dream of The World...Children Who Don't Know War		Stage productions	
2017	Boys: Snow Falls on a Southern Island		Stage productions	
2018	Kiki's Delivery Service	Tombo		
2018	Boys: Running Through Tomorrow		Stage productions	
