= Tadashi Yanai =

Japanese billionaire retailer

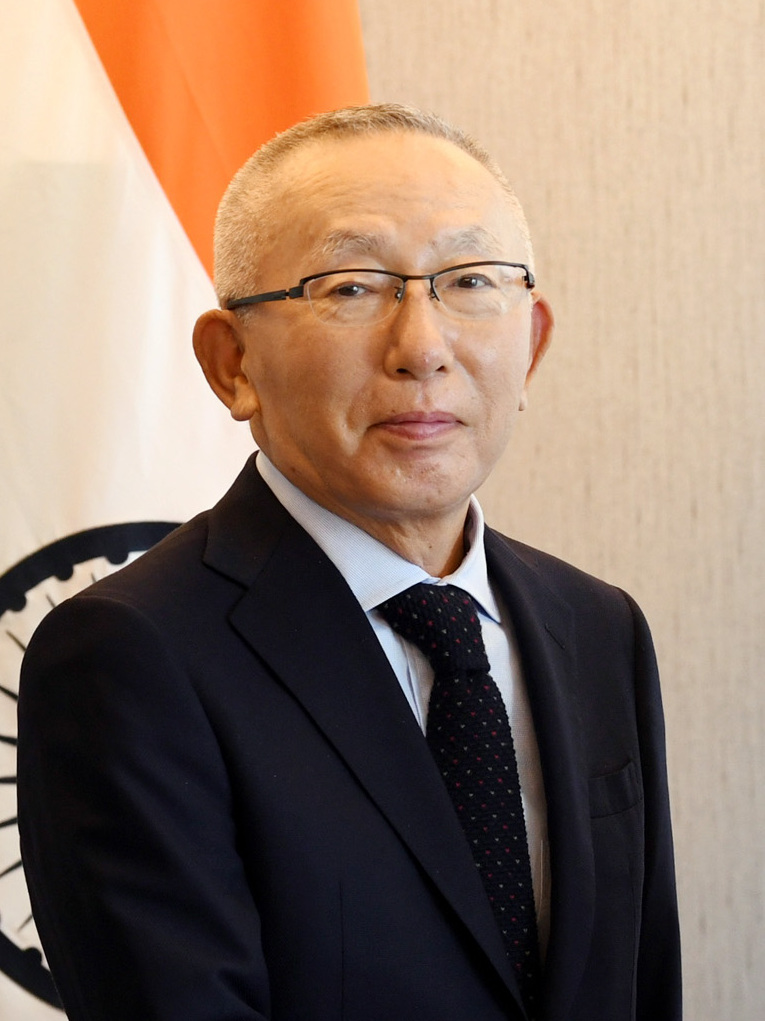
- Yanai in 2022
- Born: 7 February 1949 (age 77); Ube, Yamaguchi, Allied-occupied Japan
- Education: Waseda University
- Occupation: Businessman
- Years active: 1972–present
- Known for: Founder of Fast Retailing, parent company of Uniqlo
- Title: Chairman and President, Fast Retailing
- Spouse: Teruyo Nagaoka
- Children: 2
- Website: fastretailing.com/eng/about/company/profile_yanai.html

Tadashi Yanai (柳井 正, Yanai Tadashi; born 7 February 1949) is a Japanese billionaire businessman and the founder and president of Fast Retailing, the parent company of Uniqlo ("unique clothing"). As of May 2025, he is the richest person in Japan, with an estimated net worth of US$50.3 billion, and the 28th-wealthiest person in the world according to the Bloomberg Billionaires Index.

== Early life and education ==
Yanai was born in Ube, Yamaguchi, in February 1949. He attended Ube High School and later Waseda University, graduating in 1971 with a bachelor's degree in economics and political science. His uncle was an activist for the minority group known as Burakumin, who have continued to suffer caste-based discrimination in employment and marriage in modern Japan.

== Career ==
In 1971, Yanai started in business by selling kitchenware and men's clothing at a JUSCO supermarket. After a year at JUSCO, he quit and joined his father's roadside tailor shop. Yanai opened his first Uniqlo store in Hiroshima in 1984, and changed the name of his father's company Ogori Shoji to Fast Retailing in 1991. He has stated: "I might look successful, but I've made many mistakes. People take their failures too seriously. You have to be positive and believe you will find success next time."

In 2019, Yanai stepped down from the board of Softbank after 18 years as an independent director at the Japanese technology conglomerate.

== Philanthropy ==
In March 2011, Yanai donated 1 billion yen to victims of the 2011 Tōhoku earthquake and tsunami. In 2015, Yanai founded the Yanai Tadashi Foundation, which awards full scholarships and additional income to Japanese high school students admitted to selective colleges in the United States and the United Kingdom. As of September 2025, 310 Japanese high schoolers have received the award.

Yanai is a major donor to the University of California, Los Angeles. In 2014, he donated $2.5 million to establish the Yanai Initiative for Globalizing Japanese Humanities in partnership with Yanai's alma mater Waseda University. In 2020, he gave an additional $25 million to endow the initiative. In 2024, he donated another $31 million to the initiative.

== Personal life ==
He is the son of Kanichi Yanai and Hisako Mori Yanai. Yanai is married and has two sons, Kazumi and Koji, and lives in Tokyo. In 2018, Yanai's son Koji launched the Tokyo Toilet Project, which later became the basis of the film Perfect Days. He lives in a $50 million, 16,586-square-foot house outside of Tokyo and owns two golf courses in Hawaii.

== Awards and honours ==
- Yanai won the International Retailer of Year award for 2010 from the National Retail Federation in the US. He was the fourth Japanese national to win it, and the first since 1998, when it was won by Masatoshi Ito, owner and honorary chairman of the Ito-Yokado retailing group. He was also chosen as best company president in a survey of Japanese corporate executives by Sanno Institute of Management in 2008 and 2009.
- In 2012 he was included in the 50 Most Influential list of Bloomberg Markets Magazine.

== Published works ==
- One Win, Nine Losses (2003)
- Throw Away Your Success in a Day (2009)

== See also ==
- The World's Billionaires
