= Oumie Jammeh =

Gambian-Swedish fashion model

- Born: Gambia
- Children: 1
- Modeling information
- Height: 1.76 m (5 ft 9 1/2 in)
- Hair color: Black
- Eye color: Brown
- Agency: Next Management (worldwide); MIKAs (Stockholm) (mother agency)

Oumie Jammeh is a Swedish fashion model of Gambian heritage.

== Career ==
Jammeh started her career by submitting photos to modeling agencies, and she was signed by Next Management, and modeled during Stockholm Fashion Week in 2016. She considers British supermodel Naomi Campbell to be her biggest career inspiration.

Jammeh walked the runway for Prada, Louis Vuitton, Versace, Givenchy, Miu Miu, Altuzarra, Loewe, and Valentino. She has appeared in advertisements for J Brand, Mango, Miu Miu, and Valentino.

She has appeared in editorials for Elle, British Vogue, Vogue Italia, Elle Sweden, Vogue, Vogue France, and W.
