= Happy Surprise =

2022 single by Naniwa Danshi

- Regular Edition

Single by Naniwa Danshi

from the album POPMALL
- A-side: "Happy Surprise"
- B-side: "#Merry Christmas"; "Flower in the Snow"; "A Gift from Winter"; "One Pocket"; "I Fell in Love with You"
- Released: November 16, 2022
- Genre: J-pop
- Length: 4:37
- Label: J Storm

Naniwa Danshi singles chronology
"The Answer / Sachiare" (2022)	"Happy Surprise" (2022)	"Special Kiss" (2023)

Music video
- "Happy Surprise" on YouTube "#MerryChristmas" on YouTube

"Happy Surprise" (ハッピーサプライズ) is the third single by Japanese boy band Naniwa Danshi. It was released on November 16, 2022, under J Storm.

== Background and release ==
The release of the single was announced directly by the members during an Instagram Live broadcast held on the night of October 6, 2022, to celebrate the fourth anniversary of the group's formation. The announcement, proposed by Ryusei Onishi, was presented to fans as a "happy surprise." The single was released in multiple editions: Limited Edition 1 (CD+DVD/Blu-ray), Limited Edition 2 (CD+DVD/Blu-ray), and a regular edition. The single was released in multiple editions: Limited Edition 1 (CD+DVD/Blu-ray), Limited Edition 2 (CD+DVD/Blu-ray), and a Regular Edition.

“Happy Surprise” is the group's first winter-themed song. It is a sparkling, fast-paced love song with a catchy melody that leaves a lasting impression. Ryusei Onishi described it as “a lively, playful song that feels very much like us.” Following the Instagram Live announcement, a recording video was quickly released on the group's YouTube channel. Daigo Nishihata also noted that the choreography at the end of the chorus—where members mime zipping their mouths during the “Happy Surprise” line—is a cute and easy-to-follow highlight for fans.

The “Official Music Video (YouTube ver.)” premiered on YouTube on October 27 at 19:28 JST. Although the song features winter-themed lyrics, the video uniquely depicts falling flower petals instead of snow until the final moments. Fans praised the song as a “classic sparkling idol track,” highlighting both the members’ visuals and its traditional idol-style winter theme. Additional versions such as the “Dance ver.” and “YouTube Original LIP ver.” were also released, and by November 26, the combined views of all versions had surpassed 10 million.

The coupling track “#MerryChristmas” (pronounced “Hash Merry Christmas”)—marketed as “a new standard Christmas song for the Reiwa era”—served as the commercial song for Lawson’s Christmas campaign, in which the group also appeared. Its music video, released on November 7, reached nearly 3.5 million views in less than a month. The song and its making footage were included in Limited Edition 2. In addition, behind-the-scenes footage of the MV production was featured in the Fuji TV documentary program Ride On Time, which aired on November 18.

== Chart performance ==
The single recorded first-week sales of 516,000 copies and debuted at number one on the Oricon Weekly Singles Chart dated November 22, 2022. Following their debut single Ubu Love and second single The Answer / Sachiare, this marked the first time in Oricon history that an artist’s first three singles each exceeded 500,000 copies in first-week sales.

On Billboard Japan, the single sold 517,381 copies in its first week and reached number one on the Top Singles Sales chart dated November 23, 2022.

The single was later certified Double Platinum by the Recording Industry Association of Japan (RIAJ).

== Track listing ==
Credits adapted from Tower Records Japan.

=== CD ===
==== Limited Edition 1 ====
1. Happy Surprise [4:37]
  Lyrics and music by Keiya-amazuti- (KEYTONE); arranged by amazuti (KEYTONE)
  - Theme song for Sunstar's Ora2 me oral-care campaign "Kuchimoto Beauty de Smile!"
2. #MerryChristmas [3:50]
  Lyrics by Kenichi Sakamuro; music by Kenichi Sakamuro and Kota Sahara; arranged by Kota Sahara
  - Commercial song for the Lawson Christmas campaign
3. Flower in the Snow [4:43]
  Lyrics by Sarari Matsubara; music and arrangement by Kengo Minamida
4. Happy Surprise (Instrumental) [4:37]
5. #MerryChristmas (Instrumental) [3:50]
6. Flower in the Snow (Instrumental) [4:39]

==== Limited Edition 2 ====
1. Happy Surprise [4:37]
2. #MerryChristmas [3:50]
3. A Gift from Winter [3:41]
  Lyrics by Goro Matsui; music by Koji Makaino; arranged by Masami Ikuta
4. Happy Surprise (Instrumental) [4:37]
5. #MerryChristmas (Instrumental) [3:50]
6. A Gift from Winter (Instrumental) [3:37]

==== Regular Edition ====
1. Happy Surprise [4:37]
2. #MerryChristmas [3:50]
3. One Pocket [4:01]
  Lyrics by Funk Uchino; music by Kyosuke Yamanaka, Funk Uchino, Ryo Saito, and Masatake Hirota; arranged by ha-j
  - A mid-tempo ballad.
4. I Fell in Love with You [4:38]
  Lyrics and music by youth case; arranged by Hiroshi Sasaki

=== DVD/Blu-ray ===
Limited Edition 1
- “Happy Surprise” Music Video & Making

Limited Edition 2
- “#MerryChristmas” Music Video & Making
