= Ming Yao =

Ming Yao may refer to:

- Ming Yao Department Store, a department store in Taipei, Taiwan
- Yao Ming, a Chinese basketball executive and former professional player
