= Special Kiss (song) =

2023 single by Naniwa Danshi

- Regular Edition

Single by Naniwa Danshi

from the album POPMALL
- A-side: "Special Kiss"
- B-side: "Seishun Rhapsody"; "Haruzora"; "Atarashii Koi, Hajimeyou"; "Dance in the Rain"; "Viva Viva Carnival!!"
- Released: March 8, 2023
- Genre: J-pop
- Length: 4:47
- Label: J Storm

Naniwa Danshi singles chronology
"Happy Surprise" (2022)	"Special Kiss" (2023)	"Make Up Day / Missing" (2023)

Music video
- "Special Kiss" on YouTube "Seishun Rhapsody" on YouTube

"Special Kiss" is the fourth single by Japanese boy band Naniwa Danshi. It was released on March 8, 2023, by J Storm. The single was issued in three editions: two limited editions including a DVD or Blu-ray, and a regular CD-only edition.

The title track was used as the theme song for the film And Yet, You Are So Sweet, starring member Kyohei Takahashi in his first leading role, marking the group's first film theme song.

== Background and release ==
"Special Kiss" was released on March 8, 2023, in three editions: Limited Edition 1 and Limited Edition 2, both including a DVD or Blu-ray, and a regular CD-only edition.

The title track was written as the theme song for the film And Yet, You Are So Sweet, starring group member Kyohei Takahashi in his first leading role. As the group's first original song created for a film, it is a sweet love song that reflects the romantic tone of the movie, depicting the excitement and bittersweet feelings of unrequited love.

Musically, "Special Kiss" is a medium-tempo ballad with a slightly more mature atmosphere, performed by the group after all members had entered their twenties.

The coupling track "Seishun Rhapsody" was used as a commercial song for Benesse's "Shinken Zemi" educational service. The song is an upbeat track expressing youthful emotions and energy.

== Music video ==
The music video for "Special Kiss" premiered on YouTube on January 31, 2023. It features the members performing in white outfits while holding flowers and singing toward the camera. The video incorporates bright natural backdrops such as the sea and sky, along with choreography scenes performed by the members by the ocean.

It also includes close-up shots capturing the members' natural expressions, highlighting both their on-stage performance and off-stage charm.

The music video for "Seishun Rhapsody" was released on YouTube in February 2023. It features the members in casual outfits, performing energetic scenes that reflect youthful themes. The video includes moments of the members interacting playfully, as well as group choreography sequences, along with interspersed shots showing their more relaxed expressions.

The song is an upbeat youth anthem expressing the intense emotions of adolescence, and has been described as a song that resonates widely with listeners.

== Composition ==
"Special Kiss" is a medium-tempo ballad that features piano, strings, and layered vocal arrangements. The song incorporates both group harmonies and additional choral elements, contributing to its rich sound texture. Its arrangement places less emphasis on bass compared to contemporary trends, highlighting a more delicate and refined production style.

In contrast, "Seishun Rhapsody" features a more energetic composition with prominent electric guitar, electronic elements, and brass instrumentation. The song is structured around a sing-along style arrangement and emphasizes a more upbeat and dynamic sound.

== Chart performance ==
"Special Kiss" debuted at number one on the Oricon Weekly Singles Chart dated March 20, 2023, selling 516,199 copies in its first week.

The single peaked at number one on the Billboard Japan Top Singles Sales chart and number two on the Billboard Japan Hot 100 chart.

It surpassed the first-week sales of their previous single "Happy Surprise". This marked the group's fourth consecutive number-one single since their debut with "Ubu Love", and their fourth consecutive single to exceed 500,000 copies in first-week sales.

== Track listing ==
=== Limited Edition 1 ===
CD

1. "Special Kiss" – 4:47
2. "Seishun Rhapsody" – 3:55
3. "Haruzora" – 3:55
4. "Haruzora" (Instrumental) – 3:49

Blu-ray / DVD

1. "Special Kiss" (Music Video)
2. "Special Kiss" (Recording MV)
3. "Special Kiss" (Making)

=== Limited Edition 2 ===
CD

1. "Special Kiss" – 4:47
2. "Seishun Rhapsody" – 3:55
3. "Atarashii Koi, Hajimeyou" – 3:47
4. "Atarashii Koi, Hajimeyou" (Instrumental) – 3:43

Blu-ray / DVD

1. "Seishun Rhapsody" (Music Video)
2. "Seishun Rhapsody" (Making)

=== Regular Edition ===
CD

1. "Special Kiss" – 4:47
2. "Seishun Rhapsody" – 3:55
3. "Dance in the Rain" – 3:12
4. "Viva Viva Carnival!!" – 3:58
5. "Special Kiss" (Instrumental) – 4:45
6. "Seishun Rhapsody" (Instrumental) – 3:55
7. "Dance in the Rain" (Instrumental) – 3:12
8. "Viva Viva Carnival!!" (Instrumental) – 3:54
