= 1st Love =

Studio album by Naniwa Danshi
- Released: July 13, 2022
- Genre: J-pop
- Length: 44:30 (first edition); 53:41 (regular edition; disc1); 38:49 (regular edition; disc2)
- Label: J Storm

Naniwa Danshi chronology
1st Love (2022)	Popmall (2023)

Singles from 1st Love
- 1. "Ubu Love" Released: November 12, 2021; 2. "The Answer / Sachiare" Released: April 27, 2022

Music video
- "Diamond Smile" on YouTube

1st Love is the first album by Japanese boy band Naniwa Danshi, released on July 13, 2022, by J Storm.

== Background and release ==
The album was first announced on May 26, 2022, during an Instagram Live held to commemorate the six-month anniversary of Naniwa Danshi's debut, alongside the announcement of their nationwide tour Naniwa Danshi Debut Tour 2022 1st Love.

The album is centered around the concept of "a sparkling collection that evokes bittersweet and pure feelings of love." It includes their debut single "Ubu Love" and songs from their second single "The Answer / Sachiare", along with ten newly recorded tracks, all of which are themed around love. The first press limited edition also contains a complete collection of songs from their time as Kansai Johnny's Jr.

"Diamond Smile", a song originally performed during their Kansai Johnny's Jr. era, was newly recorded and included as the album's lead track. Its music video premiered on YouTube on June 21, 2022. The video, directed by Mai Sakai, visually highlights each member's individuality through symbolic motifs.

Another new song, "Chuki Chuki Hurricane", marked Daigo Nishihata's first attempt at songwriting, while Ryusei Onishi handled the choreography. The accompanying dance, known as the "Chuki Chuki Dance", gained popularity on TikTok and sparked a viral trend, ranking on the platform's weekly charts.

On July 12, 2022, a commemorative event for the album's release was held at Shibuya PARCO, featuring a large heart-shaped monument inspired by the album's concept. The group performed "Ubu Love" and "Diamond Smile" during the event.

To further promote the album, a livestream event titled Naniwa Danshi to Love Summer Hajimete Zukushi no Summer Festival!!!!!! was held on August 18, 2022 via Johnny's net Online.

== Chart performance ==
1st Love debuted at number one on the Oricon Weekly Albums Chart dated July 25, 2022, with first-week sales of 712,000 copies, marking the highest first-week album sales of the fiscal year at the time.

The album also topped the Oricon Combined Albums Chart in its first week, achieving the highest weekly points of the fiscal year.

It went on to rank number one on the Oricon Monthly Albums Chart for July 2022 and number two on the year-end Oricon Albums Chart.

On Billboard Japan, 1st Love debuted at number one on the Top Albums Sales chart with approximately 720,000 copies sold in its first week, and also reached number one on the Billboard Japan Hot Albums chart. It ranked number two on both the year-end Top Albums Sales and Hot Albums charts for 2022.

In addition, the album was certified triple platinum by the Recording Industry Association of Japan (RIAJ).

The album also ranked number two on Tower Records' annual Japanese albums sales chart for 2022.

== Track listing ==
=== CD ===
==== Disc 1 ====
1. "Overture" – 0:38
2. "Ubu Love" – 3:47
  Debut single; used as the theme song for the television drama My Love Mix-Up!, as well as in commercial campaigns for GU, SoftBank, and Lawson.
3. "Dreamin' Dreamin'" – 4:35
4. "Sachiare" – 3:38
  B-side of the second single; theme song for Fuji TV's Mezamashi TV.
5. "Getsu-Ka-Sui-Moku Kimi Yōbi" – 3:25
6. "Mōsōcchu Discooooooo!!" – 4:12
7. "Brand New Heroine" – 3:40
8. "Chuki Chuki Hurricane" – 3:28
  Lyrics written by Daigo Nishihata; choreography by Ryusei Onishi.
9. "Welcome to I Love You" – 4:15
10. "Sincere" – 4:32 (regular edition only)
  Theme song for the television drama Kanojo, Okarishimasu.
11. "Timeless Love" – 4:39 (regular edition only)
  Theme song for the television drama Keshigomu o Kureta Joshi o Suki ni Natta..
12. "The Answer" – 4:20
  Title track of the second single; theme song for the drama The Files of Young Kindaichi.
13. "Emerald" – 4:52
14. "Diamond Smile" – 3:40
  Lead track of the album; newly recorded version of a song originally performed during their Kansai Johnny's Jr. era.

==== Disc 2 (First press limited edition 1) ====
1. "Naniwa Lucky Boy!!" – 2:30
2. "Aoharu: With U With Me" – 3:03
  Theme song for the television drama Seiho Boys' High School!.
3. "Bokura no Sora: Ashiato no Nai Mirai" – 4:17
  Theme song for GO!GO!EXPO.
4. "2 Faced" – 4:09
5. "Seven Stars" – 3:55
  Lyrics written by the members of Naniwa Danshi.
6. "Shall We...?" – 3:23
7. "Soda Pop Love" – 4:50
8. "Time View: Hatenaku Tsuzuku Michi" – 4:05
  Lyrics written by Shunsuke Michieda.
9. "Yoiboshi" – 3:40
  Theme song for the drama Muchū sa, Kimi ni..
10. "Yume Watashi" – 4:57
  Coupling track of the debut single; theme song for the ABC High School Baseball broadcast and Nettō Kōshien.

=== DVD / Blu-ray ===
==== Disc 3 (First press limited edition 1) ====
1. "Diamond Smile" (Music Video & Making)

==== Disc 2 (First press limited edition 2) ====
1. Naniwa Danshi First Live Tour 2019–2020: Naniwa Danshi to Issho ni #Aoharu Shiyo?
  Recording of the final performance at Osaka-jō Hall.
