= The Tokyo Toilet =

Urban redevelopment project in Shibuya, Tokyo

The Tokyo Toilet is an urban redevelopment project in Shibuya, Tokyo conceived by entrepreneur Koji Yanai, of Uniqlo and Fast Retailing, and funded by the Nippon Foundation. It involves the construction of modern high-quality public restrooms, with the aim of encouraging their use and consequently the use of the public spaces they serve, such as parks and other common areas. As of January 2024, the project includes 17 structures, the first of which opened on August 5, 2020.

== Buildings ==
All toilets are located in Shibuya, distributed across the area spanning the neighborhoods of Hatagaya, Yoyogi and Ebisu. They were built to replace previous inadequate structures in terms of space, accessibility or preservation. The buildings were commissioned from 2018 to renowned international architects, who created "distinctive aesthetic" buildings that are "as much art as public utility". The toilets were built for the 2020 Summer Olympic Games, but because of the COVID-19 pandemic the games were postponed and there were almost no tourists.

Seventeen toilets were built by sixteen architects, among them Pritzker Prize winners Fumihiko Maki, Tadao Ando, Toyo Ito and Shigeru Ban.

== Film ==
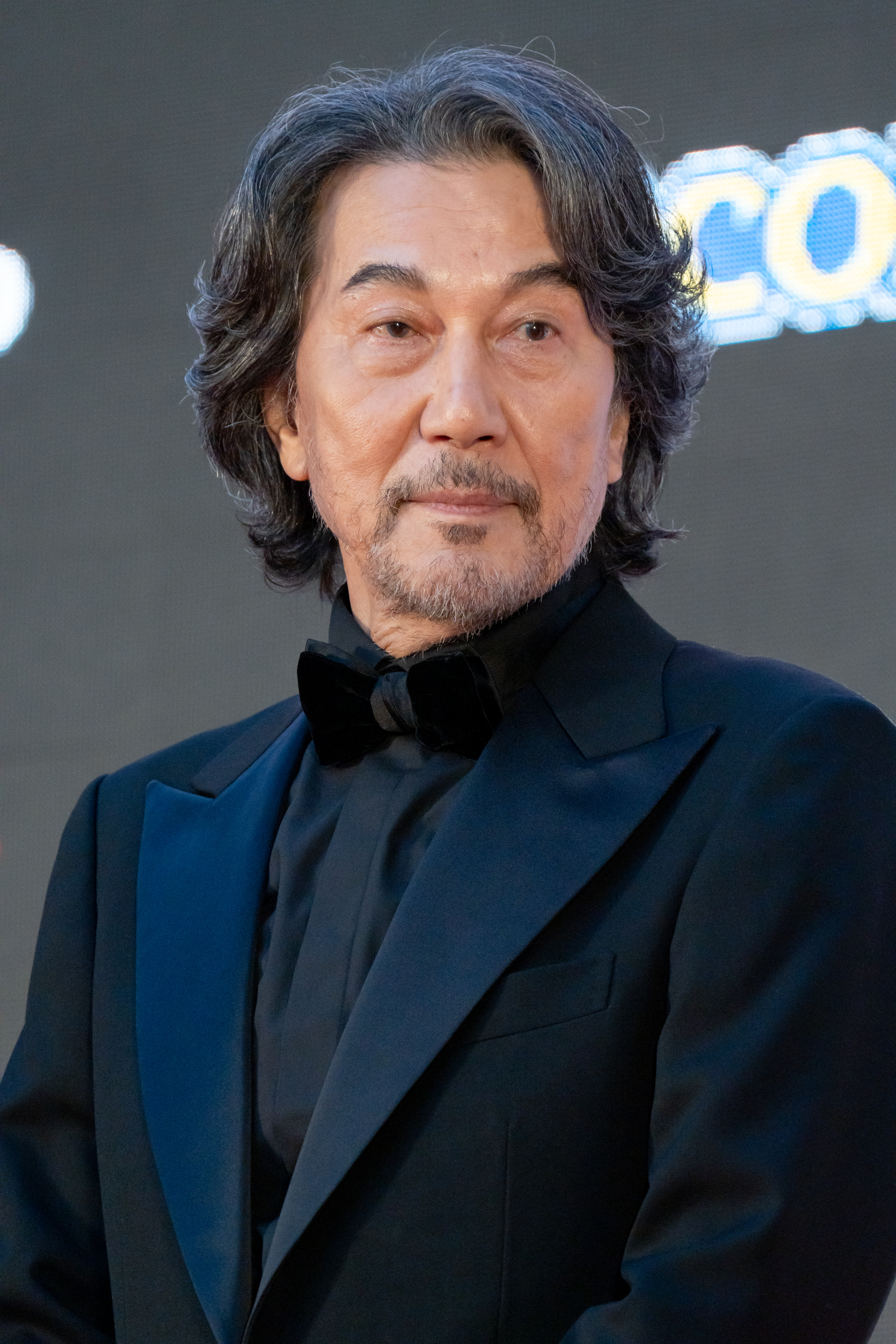
Yakusho Koji from Perfect Days at Red Carpet of the Tokyo International Film Festival 2023

To further promote the project, Koji Yanai invited screenwriter Takuma Takasaki, who suggested to make a film and invite a star director - Quentin Tarantino, Martin Scorsese or Steven Spielberg. Wim Wenders was also in the list, and Yanai invited him to Japan. Wenders had an interest in Japan before, and filmed several films there in 1980s. Yanai suggested to produce a series of short films, but Wenders decided to make a full-length movie. Perfect Days premiered in 2023. Koji Yakusho starred in the main role of a toilet cleaner, and won "the best actor" prize at the Cannes Film Festival.

Following the theatrical release of Perfect Days in international markets, interest in Japanese public facilities, particularly those of the Tokyo Toilet Project in Shibuya, has surged.

== List of buildings ==
#	Photo	Architect	Neighborhood	Address	Opening date	Notes
1		Junko Kobayashi (Gondola Architects)	Sasazuka Greenway	Sasazuka 1-29	10 March 2023	"Weathering steel cylinders"
2		Miles Pennington (University of Tokyo, DLX Design Lab)	Hatagaya neighborhood	Hatagaya 3-37-8	22 February 2023	"a toilet that can be used as an exhibition space, cinema, pop-up kiosk, information centre or public meeting place"
3		Kazoo Satō (Disruption Lab Team)	Nana-gō-dōri Park	Hatagaya 2-53-5	12 August 2021	Uses voice control to open the door, flush, and play ambient sounds
4		Takenosuke Sakakura	Nishihata Icchōme Park	Nishihara 1-29-1	31 August 2020	Glows in a dark like a lantern
5		Sou Fujimoto	Nishisandō neighborhood	Yoyogi 3-27-1	24 March 2023	Looks like "an oversized sink"
6		Toyo Ito	Yoyogi Hachiman neighborhood	Yoyogi 5-1-2	16 July 2021	Mushrooms from a nearby forest
7		Shigeru Ban	Haru no ogawa community park	Yoyogi 5-68-1	5 August 2020	"blue and green walls to complement the surrounding trees"
8		Shigeru Ban	Yoyogi Fukamachi Park	Tomigaya 1-54-1	5 August 2020	Transparent walls that become opaque when in use
9		Marc Newson	Urasandō neighborhood	Sendagaya 4-28-1	20 January 2023	Inspired by "historic Japanese temples and tea rooms"
10		Nigo	Jingūmae neighborhood	Jingūme 1-3-14	31 May 2021	"a small house with a red-pitched roof, blue-framed windows and three chimney-style elements", inspired by Washington Heights
11		Tadao Ando	Jingū-dōri Park	Jingūmae 6-22-8	7 September 2020	Circular building made using "vertical metal louvres"
12		Kengo Kuma	Nabeshima Shōtō Park	Shōtō 2-10-7	24 June 2021	"A Walk in the Woods", made using cedar wood
13		Nao Tamura	Higashi Sanchōme neighborhood	Higashi 3-27-1	7 August 2020	Inspired by Origata
14		Masamichi Katayama (Wonderwall)	Ebisu Park	Ebisu nishi 1-19-1	5 August 2020	"A maze of 15 board-marked concrete walls"
15		Kashiwa Satō	West exit of Ebisu Station	Ebisu minami 1-5-8	15 July 2021	A box made from "white aluminium louvres"
16		Fumihiko Maki	Ebisu higashi park	Ebisu 1-2-16	7 August 2020	"Squid Toilet", with a courtyard in its center
17		Tomohito Ushiro	Hiro'o Higashi Park	Hiro'o 4-2-27	22 July 2022	Light panel "displays 7.9 billion different light patterns referencing the world's population at the point the project was conceived"
