= Ming Yao Department Store =

- 明曜百貨

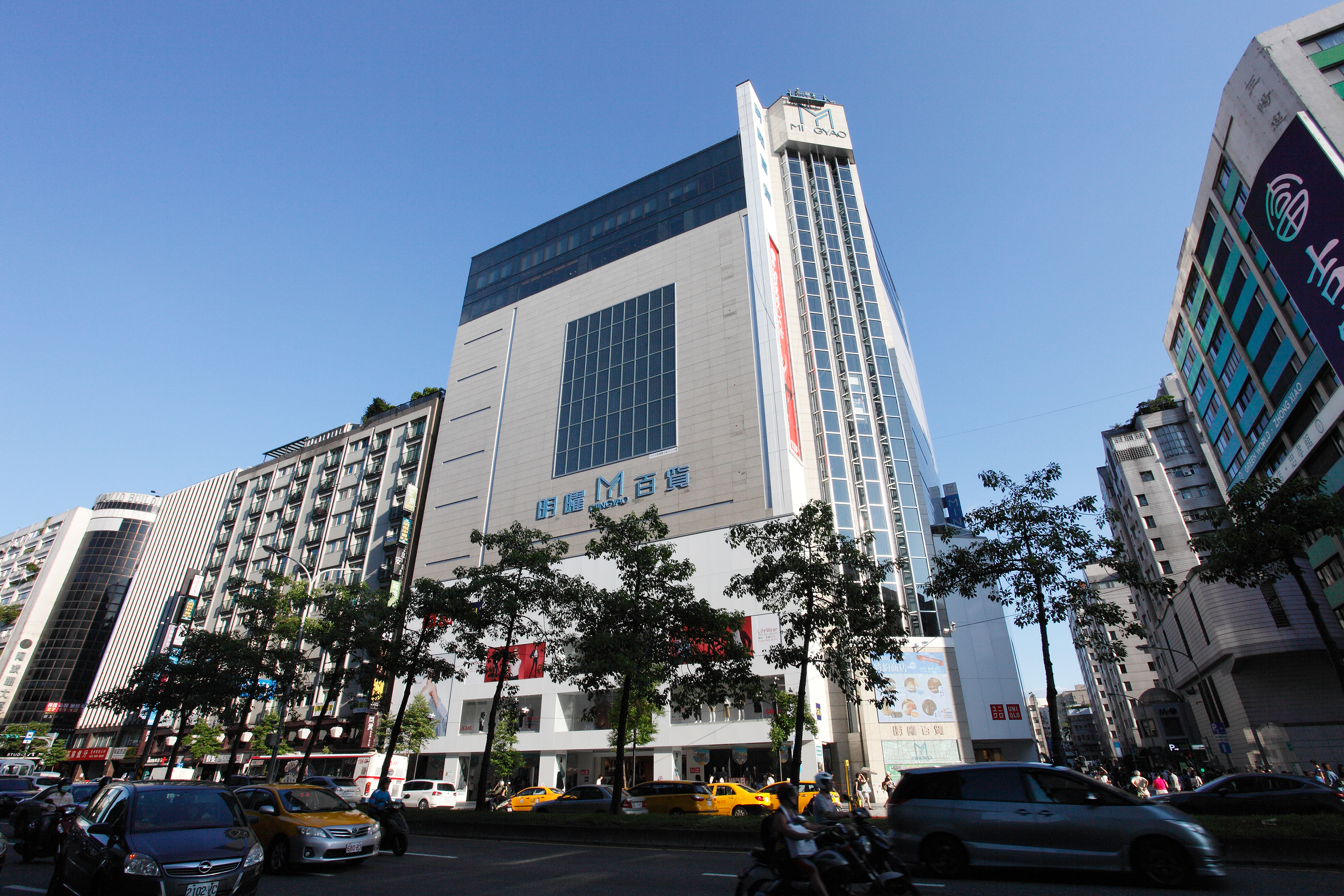
- Location: No. 200, Section 4, Zhongxiao East Road, Da'an District, Taipei, Taiwan
- Coordinates: 25°2′28.5″N 121°33′8″E
- Opened: April 1987
- Floors: 12 above ground 3 below ground
- Website: http://www.mingyao.com.tw/

The Ming Yao Department Store (Chinese: 明曜百貨) is a department store on Zhongxiao Road, Da'an District, Taipei, Taiwan that opened in April 1987. Main core stores include Nitori, Uniqlo, GU, Junkudō Bookstore, and various themed restaurants.

== History ==
Ming Yao Department Store Co., Ltd. was established in April 1987. In 1993, the Ming Yao Credit Card was issued with the Union Bank of Taiwan.

In March 2011, the entire department store was closed for renovation. On September 23, 2011, it was re-opened after modification. Uniqlo's sixth flagship store in the world opened on the first to third floors, covering an area of 3,630 m^{2} (39,100 sq ft).

On October 17, 2014, Taiwan's second GU opened on the ground floor. On July 17, 2020, the Mingyao branch of Junkudō Bookstore on the 9th floor opened. This store is the fourth branch of Junkudō Bookstore in Taiwan.

== Gallery ==
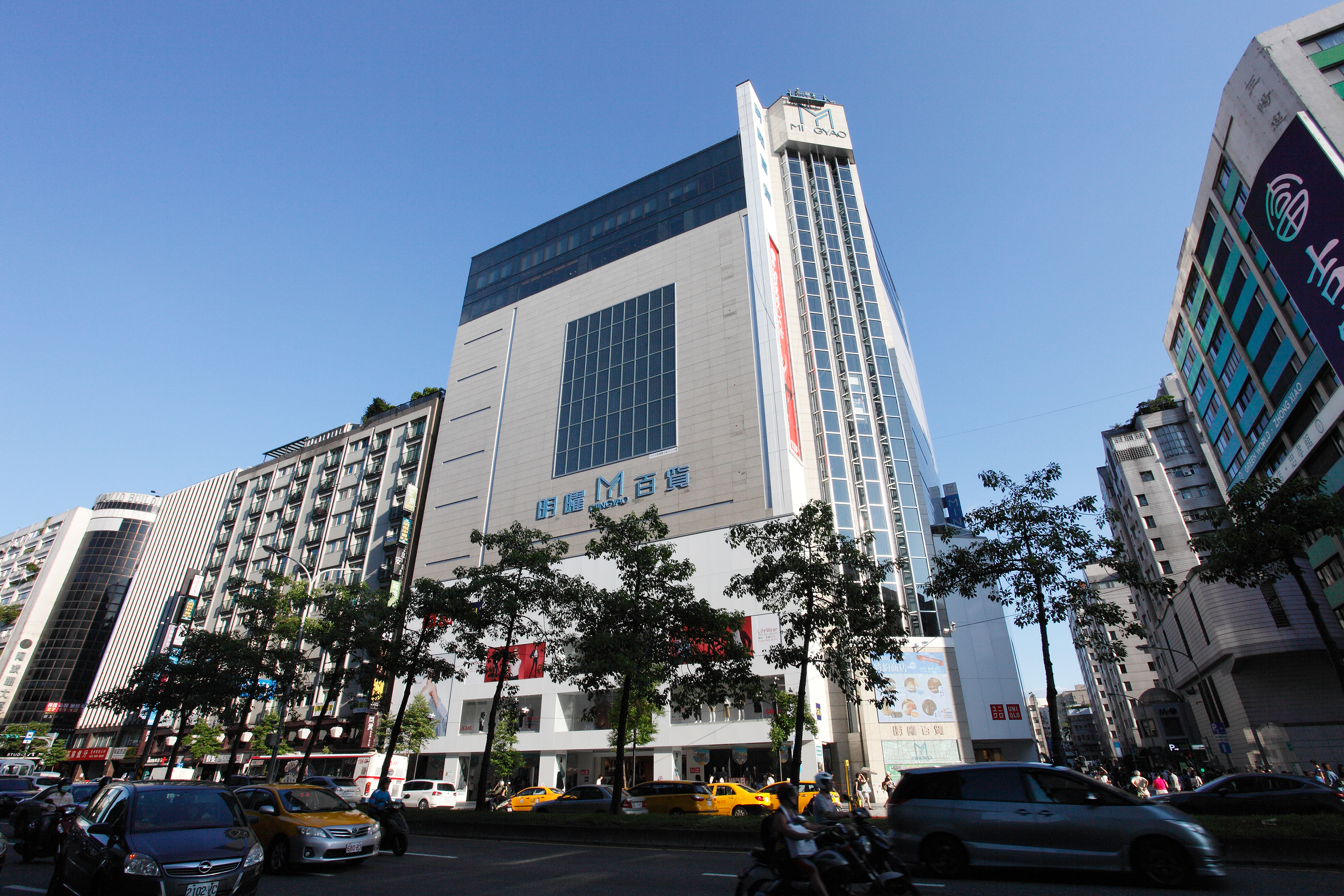
Exterior

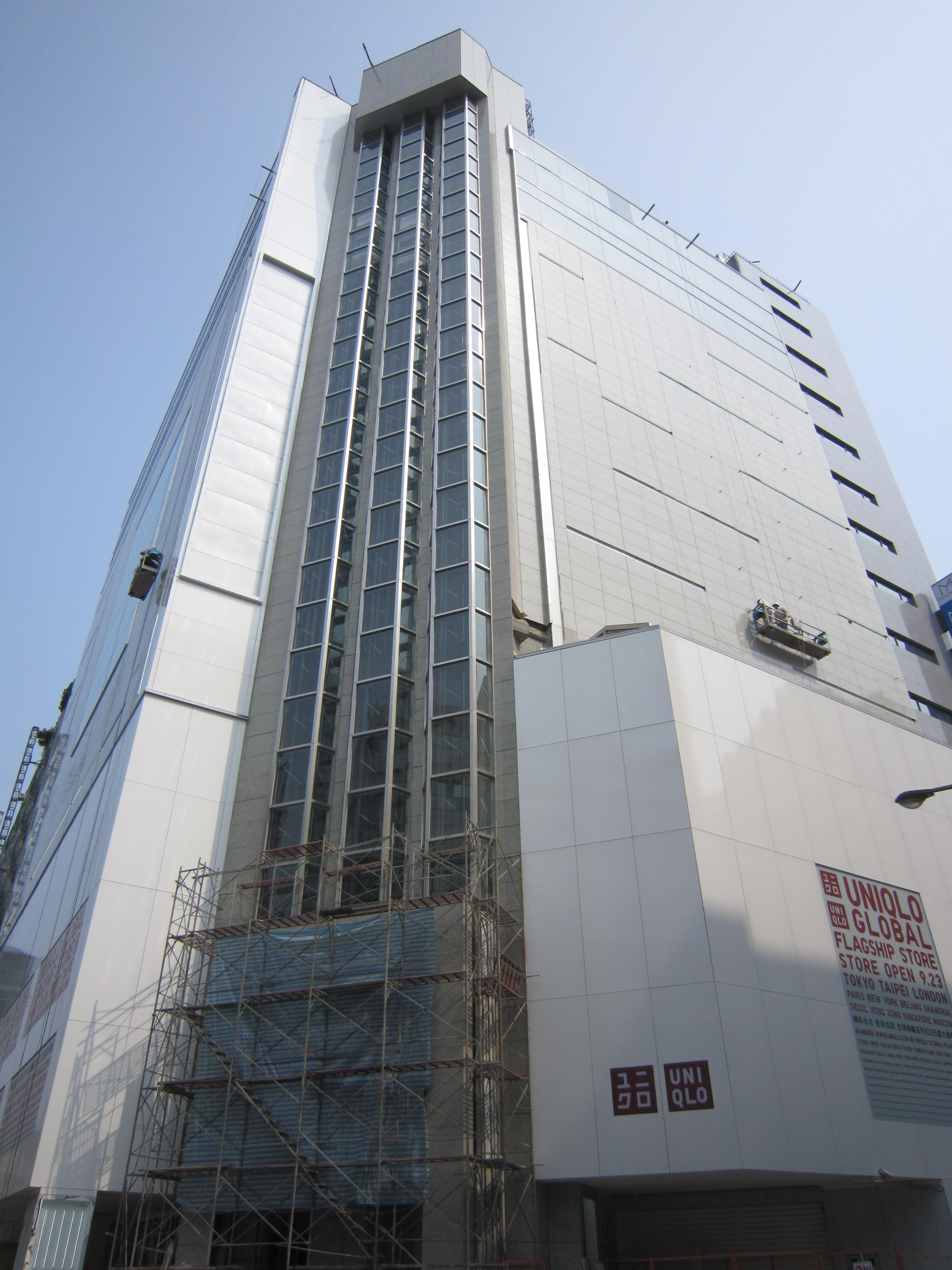

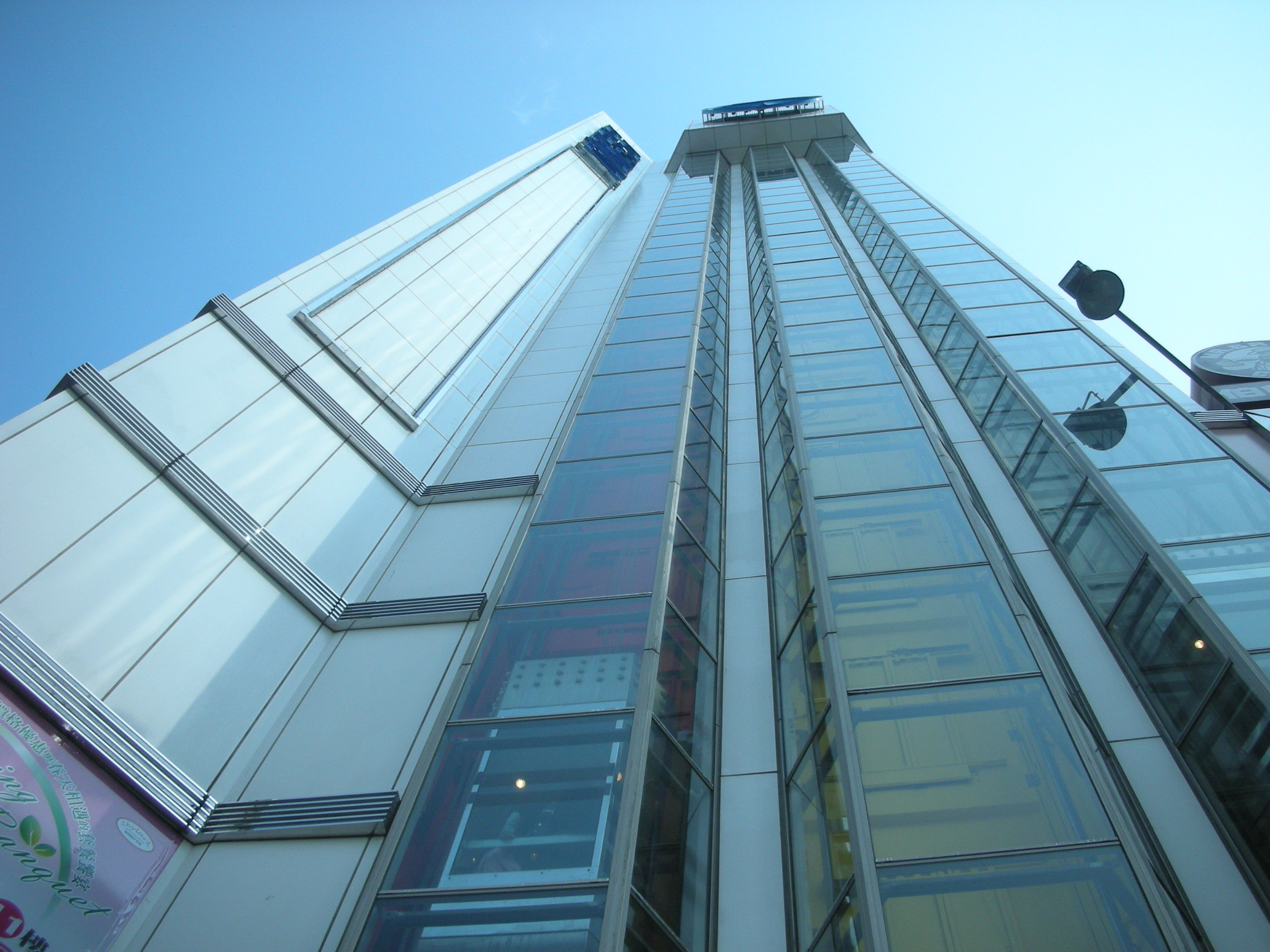

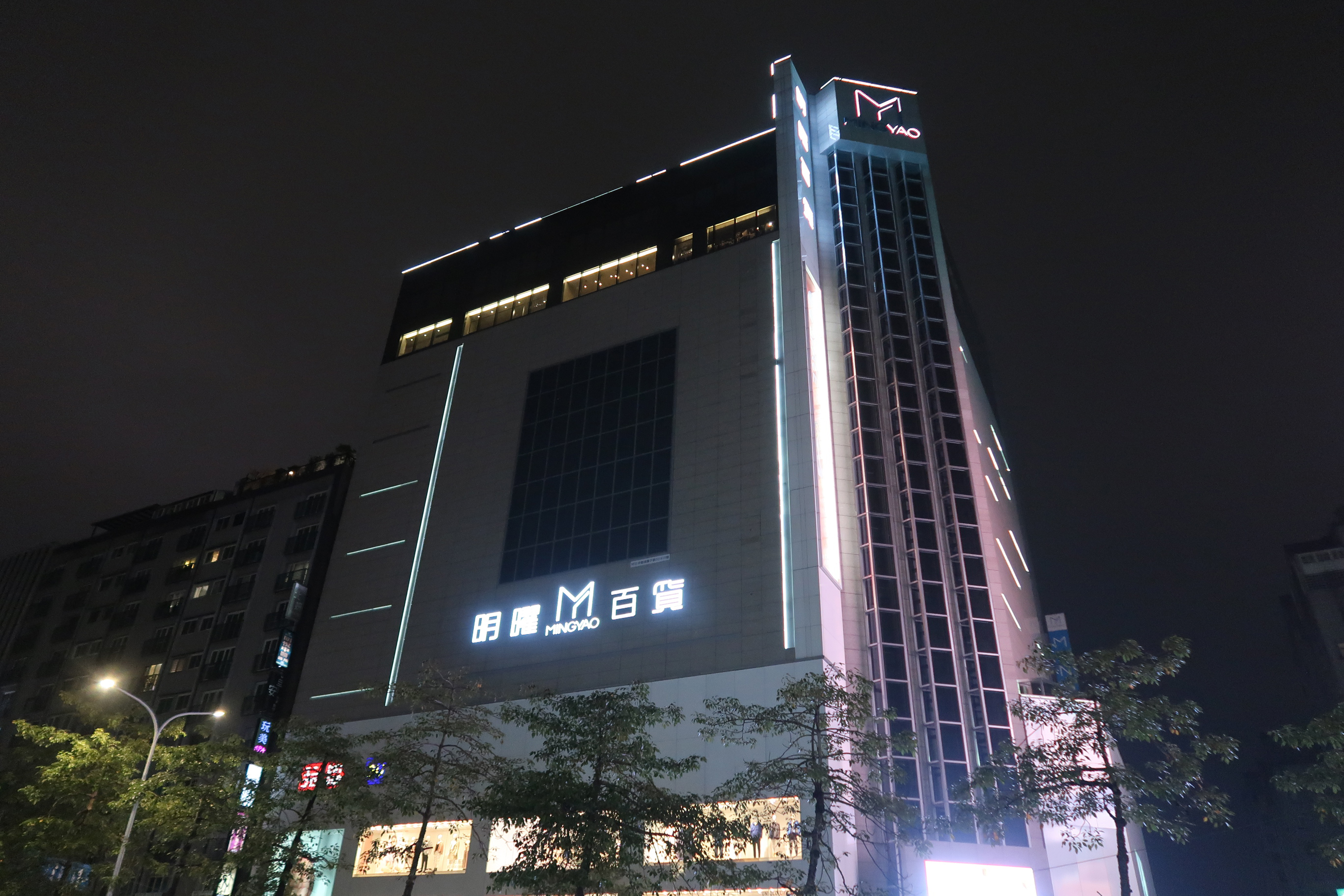
At night

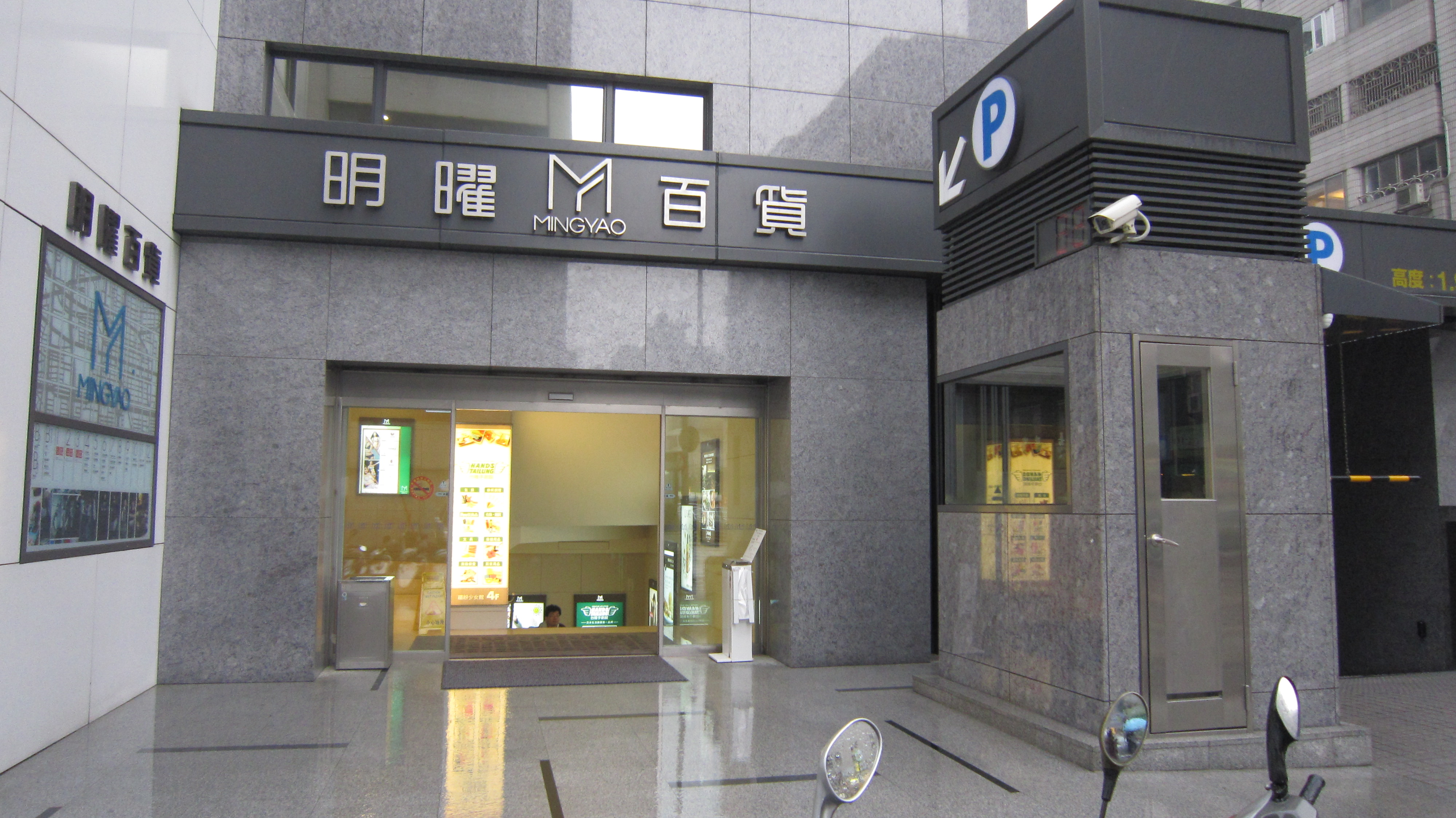
Entrance

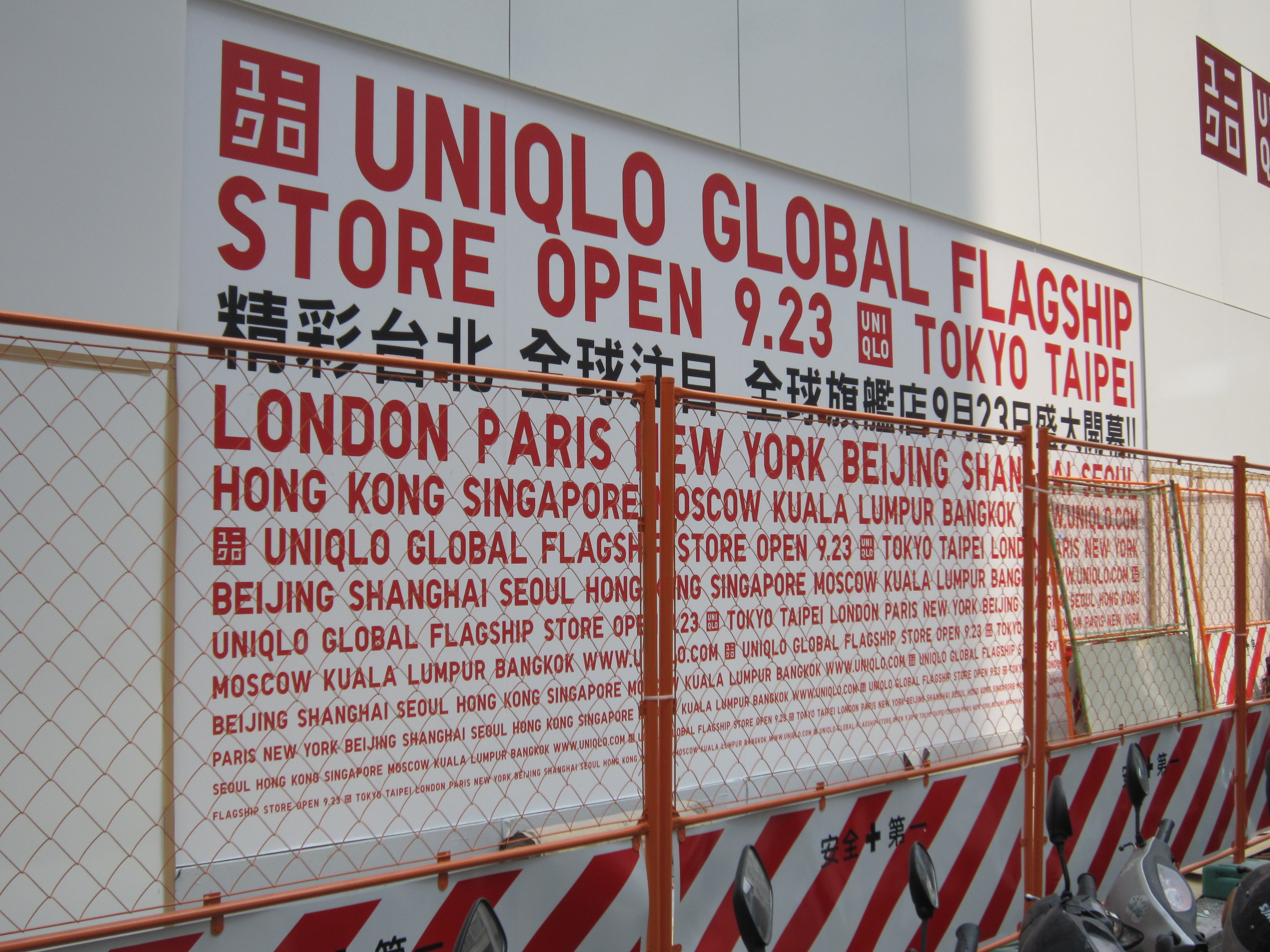
Uniqlo

== See also ==
- List of tourist attractions in Taipei
