= The Answer / Sachiare =

2022 single by Naniwa Danshi

- Limited edition 1

Single by Naniwa Danshi

from the album 1st Love
- A-side: "The Answer"; "Sachiare"
- B-side: "Nande?!"; "Naniwa no Danshi Yanen!"; "Mahōgaoka"; "Good Day!!"
- Released: April 27, 2022
- Genre: J-pop
- Length: 4:20 ("The Answer"); 3:38 ("Sachiare")
- Label: J Storm
- Songwriters: Shun Kusakawa, Kenichi Sakamuro, Kota Sahara ("The Answer"); Yujin Kitagawa ("Sachiare")

Naniwa Danshi singles chronology
"Ubu Love" (2021)	"The Answer / Sachiare" (2022)	"Happy Surprise" (2022)

Music video
- "The Answer" on YouTube "Sachiare" on YouTube

"The Answer / Sachiare" (The Answer/サチアレ) is the second single by Japanese boy band Naniwa Danshi. It was released on April 27, 2022, through J Storm. The single is a double A-side release featuring the songs "The Answer" and "Sachiare".

== Background and release ==
The single was released approximately five months after the group's debut single, "Ubu Love". It was issued in five versions: two limited editions (each available in DVD and Blu-ray formats) and a regular edition, all featuring different cover artwork.

The release presents contrasting concepts of "darkness" and "light". In addition to the title tracks, the single includes a variety of coupling songs such as city pop–influenced tracks, youth-themed anthems, and novelty songs.

== Composition and themes ==
"The Answer" is a dance track characterized by a dark and mysterious tone, marking a departure from the group's brighter debut image. It was used as the theme song for the Nippon TV drama The Files of Young Kindaichi, starring member Shunsuke Michieda.

The music video features a Western-style library setting, with members dressed in monochrome outfits performing intense choreography. The costumes incorporate the letters "ND", representing "Naniwa Danshi". According to the members, the choreography required more time to learn than any of their previous songs.

"Sachiare" is a pop anthem written by Yujin Kitagawa of Yuzu. It served as the theme song for Fuji TV's morning program Mezamashi TV. The title "Sachiare" is a Japanese expression meaning "may happiness be with you" or "wishing you happiness." The song conveys an encouraging message about everyday life leading toward a brighter future.

Its music video follows a narrative in which seeds grow into blooming flowers, symbolizing growth and hope. The members appear in bright yellow outfits, performing in a fictional setting called "Naniwa Town".

== Promotion ==
The music video for "The Answer" was released on YouTube on April 5 at 7:28 p.m., referencing "Naniwa" wordplay. It surpassed one million views within approximately 13 hours of release.

"Sachiare" was first performed on television on Mezamashi TV on April 22, 2022.

== Track listing ==
=== Limited Edition 1 ===
1. "The Answer" – 4:20
2. "Sachiare" – 3:38
3. "Nande?!" – 3:34
4. "The Answer" (instrumental)
5. "Sachiare" (instrumental)
6. "Nande?!" (instrumental)

=== Limited Edition 2 ===
1. "Sachiare" – 3:39
2. "The Answer" – 4:20
3. "Naniwa no Danshi Yanen!" – 4:13
4. "Sachiare" (instrumental)
5. "The Answer" (instrumental)
6. "Naniwa no Danshi Yanen!" (instrumental)

=== Regular edition ===
1. "The Answer" – 4:20
2. "Sachiare" – 3:38
3. "Mahōgaoka" – 4:56
4. "Good Day!!" – 4:40

== Charts ==
The single sold 535,000 copies in its first week and debuted at number one on the Oricon Weekly Singles Chart, becoming the group's second consecutive single to exceed 500,000 copies in first-week sales.

On Billboard Japan, it sold 534,004 copies in its first week, topping both the Top Singles Sales chart and the Japan Hot 100. By November 27, 2022, total sales had reached 631,402 copies, ranking tenth on the year-end Top Singles Sales chart.

== Certifications ==
- Japan (RIAJ): Double Platinum

== Accolades ==
"The Answer" won the Best Drama Song award at the 112th Television Drama Academy Awards in August 2022.
