= Popmall =

- Regular edition

Studio album by Naniwa Danshi
- Released: July 12, 2023
- Genre: J-pop
- Length: 63:13
- Label: J Storm

Naniwa Danshi chronology
1st Love (2022)	Popmall (2023)	+Alpha (2024)

Singles from Popmall
- 1. "Happy Surprise" Released: November 16, 2022; 2. "Special Kiss" Released: March 8, 2023

Music video
- "Poppin' Hoppin' Lovin'" on YouTube "LAI-LA-LA" on YouTube

Popmall (stylized in all caps) is the second studio album by Japanese boy band Naniwa Danshi, released on July 12, 2023.

== Background and release ==
The album was first announced by the members during an Instagram Live broadcast titled "#なにわと全力笑顔インライ" on May 10, 2023, ahead of its official public announcement. At the same time, the group revealed their nationwide tour Naniwa Danshi LIVE TOUR 2023 "POPMALL", which began on July 27, 2023, at Osaka-jō Hall.

The album is conceptually described as a "shopping mall of songs", featuring a wide variety of pop-oriented tracks across different styles and genres. It includes a total of 15 songs available across all editions, such as the single "Special Kiss", the third single "Happy Surprise", and the new track "Blue Story", which was used in a Sea Breeze commercial. The regular edition additionally contains the bonus track "Chukichuki Blizzard".

"Poppin' Hoppin' Lovin'" serves as the album's lead track, acting as an entry point into its vibrant and playful pop world. Its music video premiered on June 6, 2023. The song was first performed on television on Music Station 2 Hour Special on July 7, 2023.

In contrast, the track "Lai-La-La" showcases a more intense and mature side of the group, featuring one of their most technically demanding dance performances. Its music video gained attention online, surpassing 1.6 million views shortly after release.

To commemorate the album's release, a limited-time pop-up event, Naniwa Danshi Pop Up Mall, was held in Tokyo.

== Chart performance ==
Popmall debuted at number one on the Oricon Weekly Albums Chart, marking the group's second consecutive number-one album since their debut. It also topped the Oricon Combined Albums Chart in its first week.

The album ranked number one on the Oricon Monthly Albums Chart for July 2023 and later placed eighth on the Oricon Year-end Albums Chart for 2023.

On Billboard Japan, Popmall debuted at number one on both the Top Albums Sales chart and the Hot Albums chart. It later ranked ninth on the Billboard Japan Top Albums Sales year-end chart for 2023.

The track "Lai-La-La" also reached number seven on the Oricon YouTube Chart.

The album was certified double platinum by the Recording Industry Association of Japan (RIAJ) in July 2023.

== Track listing ==
=== CD ===
1. "Poppin' Hoppin' Lovin'" – 3:26
  Lyrics and music by youth case; arranged by Hiroshi Sasaki
  Lead track of the album. A pop and stylish song.
2. "Prime Time" – 4:18
  Lyrics by youth case; music by Erik Lidbom and youth case; arranged by Tomoki Ishizuka
3. "Happy Surprise" – 4:37
  Lyrics and music by amazuti; arranged by amazuti
  - Third single
  - Sunstar "Ora2" campaign song
4. "Tutti Frutti" – 3:18
  Lyrics by Yuki Tsujimura; music by HIKARI; arranged by Taku Yoshioka
  Funk-influenced hip hop track.
5. "I Know" – 3:30
  Lyrics by YU-G; music and arrangement by h-wonder
6. "Lai-La-La" – 3:27
  Lyrics by MiNE and Atsushi Shimada; music by Kevin Borg and Peter Nord; arranged by Peter Nord and Akiyuki Tateyama
7. "Wanna Be Yours" – 3:13
  Lyrics by youth case; music and arrangement by Tomoki Ishizuka and youth case
8. "Magic" – 4:13
  Lyrics and music by Yuta Higashi; arranged by CHOKKAKU
9. "Special Kiss" – 4:47
  Lyrics and music by Shun Kusakawa, Kenichi Sakamuro, and Kota Sahara; arranged by Kota Sahara; strings arranged by Yasumasa Sato
  - Fourth single
  - Theme song of the film And Yet, You Are So Sweet
  - SoftBank commercial song
10. "Tick Tack Heart" – 3:56
  Lyrics by Yuki Tamatani; music by Erik Lidbom and Yuki Tamatani; arranged by Hiroshi Sasaki
11. "Super Drivers!!" – 3:29
  Lyrics by Funk Uchino; music and arrangement by Josef Melin; brass arrangement by Yoshinari Takegami
12. "Nee" (ねぇ) – 4:20
  Lyrics, music, and arrangement by Atsushi Shimada and Kenichi Sakamuro
  Features lyrics written in the Kansai dialect.
13. "Blue Story" – 4:30
  Lyrics and music by youth case; arranged by ha-j
  - Sea Breeze commercial song
  A youth-themed song reflecting the 2023 campaign slogan “After sweat, comes sunshine”.
14. "Melody" – 5:03
  Lyrics by Yuuki Sano and Yuki Tsujimura; music by Erik Lidbom and Yuuki Sano; arranged by Hiroshi Sasaki
15. "Paradise" – 3:35
  Lyrics by Kazunari Okada; music by Erik Lidbom; arranged by Ken Ito
16. "Chukichuki Blizzard" (ちゅきちゅきブリザード) – 3:23 (regular edition only)
  Lyrics by Daigo Nishihata; music by amazuti; arranged by amazuti
  A sequel to "Chukichuki Hurricane", themed around relationship stagnation.

=== Blu-ray / DVD ===
Limited edition 1

1. "Poppin' Hoppin' Lovin'" – Music Video & Making
2. "Poppin' Hoppin' Lovin'" – Recording Behind
3. "Blue Story" – Recording MV

Limited edition 2

1. "Lai-La-La" – Music Video & Making
2. "Lai-La-La" – Music Video (Dance Ver.)
3. "Lai-La-La" – Music Video (Solo Dance Ver.)
4. "Lai-La-La" – Choreography Behind
