= Jeffrey Rudes =

American executive and entrepreneur

Jeffrey Rudes is an American businessman who has worked since 1987 in the fashion industry. He is chairman and creative director for womenswear brand L'Agence, a company he was involved with financing and co-founding on its launch in 2008. He is also a majority owner of the brand.

Before returning to L'Agence, Rudes co-founded and was CEO of jeans wear label J Brand from its founding in 2005 until May 2014. In this role, he oversaw collaborations on collections with brands including New York-based Proenza Schouler, Scottish designer Christopher Kane and British fashion brand Topshop.
