= Perfect Days =

2023 film by Wim Wenders

- Japanese theatrical release poster
- Directed by: Wim Wenders
- Written by: Wim Wenders; Takuma Takasaki
- Produced by: Wim Wenders; Takuma Takasaki; Koji Yanai
- Starring: Kōji Yakusho; Tokio Emoto; Arisa Nakano; Aoi Yamada; Yumi Asō; Sayuri Ishikawa; Tomokazu Miura; Min Tanaka
- Cinematography: Franz Lustig
- Edited by: Toni Froschhammer
- Production companies: Master Mind; Spoon; Wenders Images
- Distributed by: DCM (Germany); Bitters End (Japan)
- Release dates: 25 May 2023 (Cannes); 21 December 2023 (Germany); 22 December 2023 (Japan)
- Running time: 124 minutes
- Countries: Japan; Germany
- Language: Japanese
- Box office: US$26.9 million

Perfect Days is a 2023 Japanese-language drama film directed by Wim Wenders from a script written by Wenders and Takuma Takasaki. A co-production between Japan and Germany, the film follows the routine life of Hirayama (Kōji Yakusho), a public toilet cleaner in Tokyo.

Perfect Days premiered on 23 May 2023 at the 76th Cannes Film Festival, where it competed for the Palme d'Or and won the Prize of the Ecumenical Jury and the Best Actor Award for Kōji Yakusho. It was nominated for the Best International Feature Film at the 96th Academy Awards, becoming the first film directed by a non-Japanese filmmaker to be nominated as the Japanese entry.

== Plot ==
Hirayama works as a public toilet cleaner for The Tokyo Toilet project in Tokyo's upscale Shibuya district, across town from his modest home in a middle-class neighbourhood east of the Sumida River. He repeats his structured, repetitive routine each day, starting at dawn. His pride in his work is apparent by its thoroughness and precision. He dedicates his free time to his passion for music cassettes, which he listens to in his van to and from work, and to his books (Faulkner, Kōda, Highsmith), which he reads every night before going to sleep. His dreams are shown in flickery impressionistic black-and-white sequences at the end of every day. Hirayama is also fond of trees and spends time gardening and photographing trees. He eats a sandwich every day in the shade under trees in the grounds of a shrine, and takes film photos of their branches and leaves and the 'Komorebi' (木漏れ日) – sunlight filtered by the leaves. Hirayama's love of trees is contrasted with the repeated appearance of the Tokyo Skytree during his drives and bike rides through the city.

Hirayama's young assistant, Takashi, is often late, loud, and not as thorough. One day, a young woman named Aya calls on Takashi at the toilet he is cleaning, so he hurries to finish. He tries to leave with Aya, but his motorbike will not start, so he persuades Hirayama to let him use his van. When Aya says Takashi can stay with her as she works at a girls bar, he complains that he is broke. Unbeknownst to Hirayama, Takashi slips Hirayama's Patti Smith tape into Aya's purse. Takashi talks Hirayama into going into a shop to get some of his cassettes appraised. When Takashi discovers they are valuable, he urges Hirayama to sell but Hirayama refuses, giving him some cash so he can take Aya out. When Hirayama runs out of fuel, he is forced to sell a cassette for fuel money.

Hirayama commences a tic-tac-toe game with a stranger after finding a piece of paper left hidden in a stall. The game continues over the course of the film. He exchanges furtive glances with a woman eating lunch one bench over.

Aya catches up with Hirayama to return his cassette. She asks to play it in his van one last time, and then gives him a thank-you kiss on the cheek, leaving him visibly startled.

On his free day, Hirayama does his laundry, takes the film with his tree photos to be developed, cleans his flat, buys a new book, and dines at a restaurant where the proprietor shares gossip with him. Niko, Hirayama's niece, shows up unannounced, having run away from his wealthy estranged sister Keiko. Hirayama lets Niko accompany him to work during the next two days. They photograph the trees in the park and ride bikes together. Eventually, Keiko comes to pick up Niko in a chauffeured car. Keiko tells him that their father's dementia has worsened and asks whether Hirayama will visit him in the nursing home where he lives. She says that he does not recognise anything anymore and will not behave the way he did before. Hirayama sorrowfully refuses but hugs his sister goodbye. Before she leaves, she asks him whether he really cleans toilets for a living, and he says yes. As they drive away, Hirayama begins to cry inconsolably.

The next day, Takashi quits without giving notice, leaving Hirayama to cover his shift. Later, as Hirayama goes to his usual restaurant, he sees the female proprietor embracing a man. Hirayama hurries off, buying cigarettes and three bottled highballs to consume at a nearby riverbank. The man Hirayama saw at the restaurant approaches and asks him for a cigarette. The man tells him the restaurant proprietor is his ex-wife whom he had not seen in seven years, and that she opened her restaurant the year after divorcing him. He says he visited her to make peace before he dies of cancer, telling Hirayama to look after her. Hirayama lightens the mood by offering him a drink and inviting him to play shadow tag, and they eventually part ways.

The following morning, Hirayama begins another workweek. As he drives his van and listens to Nina Simone sing "Feeling Good", a range of powerful emotions wash over his face.

== Cast ==
- Kōji Yakusho as Hirayama
- Tokio Emoto as Takashi
- Arisa Nakano as Niko
- Aoi Yamada as Aya
- Yumi Asō as Keiko
- Sayuri Ishikawa as Mama
- Tomokazu Miura as Tomoyama
- Min Tanaka as homeless
- Wim Wenders as cassette shop customer

== Production ==
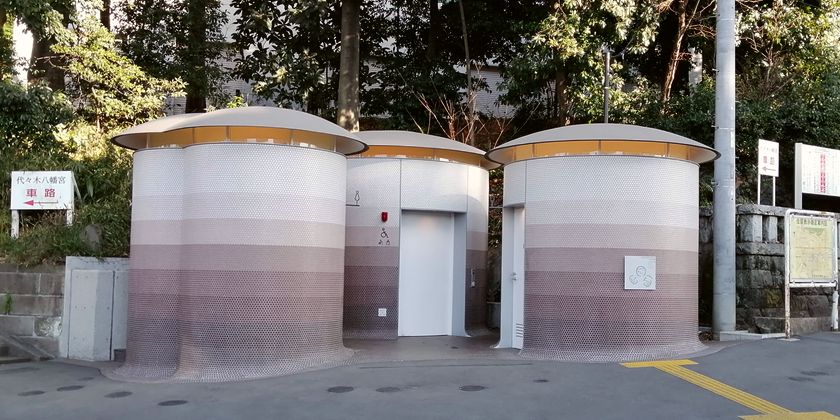
The Tokyo Toilet, Yoyogi-Hachiman was one of the filming locations.

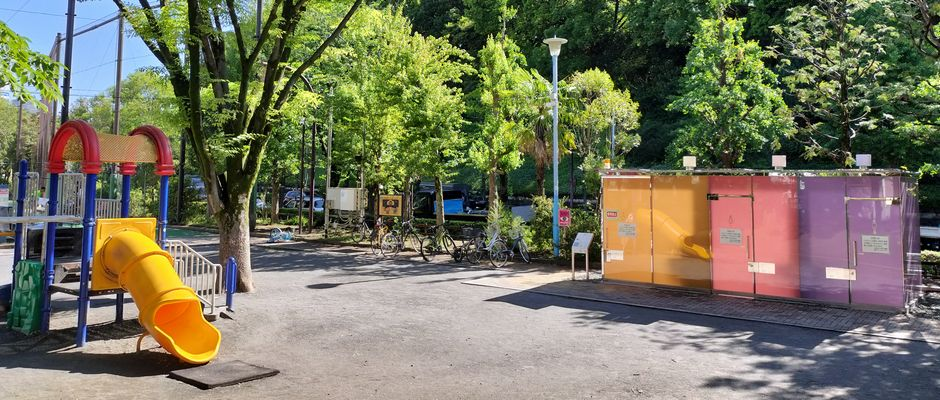
The Tokyo Toilet, Yoyogi Fukamachi Mini Park has walls that turn opaque when switched on.

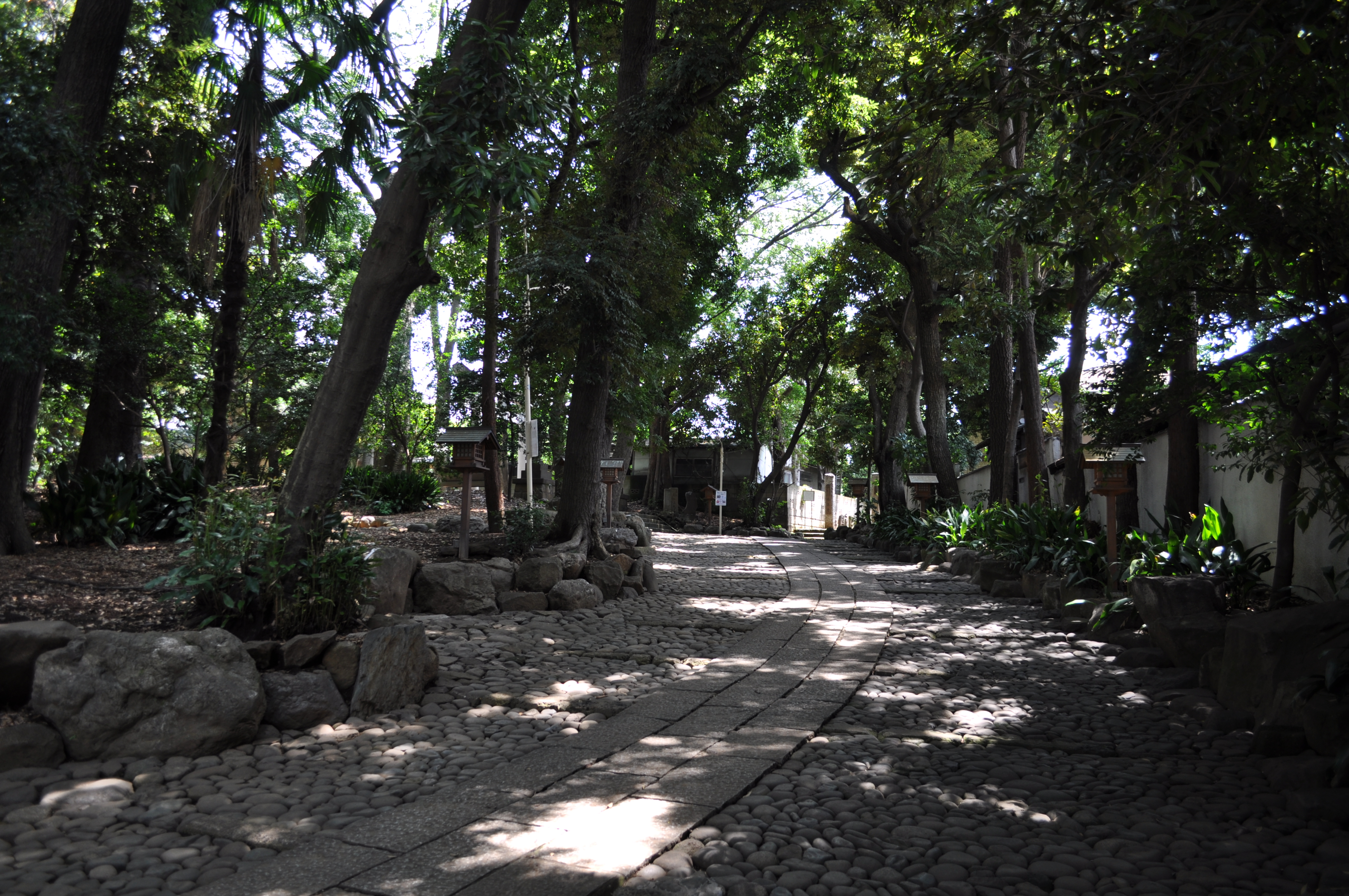
Yoyogi-Hachiman-gū was the filming location where Hirayama takes his lunch break.

Right after COVID-19 pandemic precautions eased, Wenders was invited to Tokyo by Koji Yanai to observe The Tokyo Toilet, a project in which Japanese public toilets were redesigned in 17 locations throughout Shibuya. Designed by contemporary architects including Tadao Ando, Shiguru Ban, Toyo Ito, Kengo Kuma, Fumihiko Maki, and others, the Tokyo Toilet project forms the mise-en-scène for much of the film. The toilets were commissioned by The Nippon Foundation as "a symbol of Japan's world-renowned hospitality culture", which their designers say were created with safety, cleanliness and inclusivity in mind.

At first, the producers envisioned Wenders would make a short film or series of short films on the facilities, but he opted for a feature film, with co-screenwriter Takuma Takasaki explaining that the conception of the character of Hirayama felt like new territory for them. In an interview with The Progressive, Wenders revealed that, in his conception, Hirayama was a wealthy alcoholic businessman who, after ending up in a hotel room with no memory, contemplating suicide, and being struck by the beauty of sunlight falling through leaves, gave up his career and became a gardener and then a toilet cleaner. The film is produced by Master Mind Limited (Japan) and Spoon Inc. (Japan) in collaboration with Wenders Images (Germany).

The film was shot over 17 days in Tokyo.

The style of the film takes inspiration from the style of Japanese director Yasujirō Ozu. The minimalist approach to storytelling, the focus on ordinary life, and the 4:3 aspect ratio of the film are all nods to Ozu. Also, the name Hirayama comes from a common character name in Ozu's films (Tokyo Story, An Autumn Afternoon).

== Soundtrack ==
The music that Hirayama listens to with his cassettes is a major motif in the film. In describing the way that Hirayama chooses the music he listens to, Wenders said: "Maybe he's clinging to the past. But he's clinging a little bit also to his youth and he loves that music. He chooses in the morning exactly what he's going to listen to that day. And it's not random." Wenders described Lou Reed as "a mighty voice in the film".

Title	Artist	Year
"The House of the Rising Sun"	The Animals	1964
"Pale Blue Eyes"	The Velvet Underground	1969
"(Sittin' On) The Dock of the Bay"	Otis Redding	1968
"Redondo Beach"	Patti Smith	1975
"(Walkin' Thru The) Sleepy City"	The Rolling Stones	1964
"Perfect Day"	Lou Reed	1972
"Aoi Sakana"	Sachiko Kanenobu	1972
"Sunny Afternoon"	The Kinks	1966
"The House of the Rising Sun" (Japanese version) (Note: Translated into Japanese by Maki Asakawa, who first recorded the version in 1972.)	Sayuri Ishikawa	2023
"Brown Eyed Girl"	Van Morrison	1967
"Feeling Good"	Nina Simone	1965
"Perfect Day" (Komorebi Version)	Patrick Watson	2024

== Release ==
Perfect Days was selected to compete for the Palme d'Or at the 2023 Cannes Film Festival, where it had its world premiere on 25 May. It was also invited to the 27th Lima Film Festival in the Acclaimed section, where it was screened on 11 August 2023. Subsequent screenings were held at the 2023 Toronto International Film Festival and 2023 New York Film Festival.

World sales were handled by The Match Factory, with Neon distributing the film in the United States, and Mubi distributing the film in the United Kingdom, Ireland, Turkey and Latin America.

Perfect Days was released in Germany on 21 December 2023 by DCM, and in Japan on 22 December by Bitters End. The film was released in the U.S. on 7 February 2024.

The film is available on home video from The Criterion Collection.

== Reception ==
=== Critical response ===
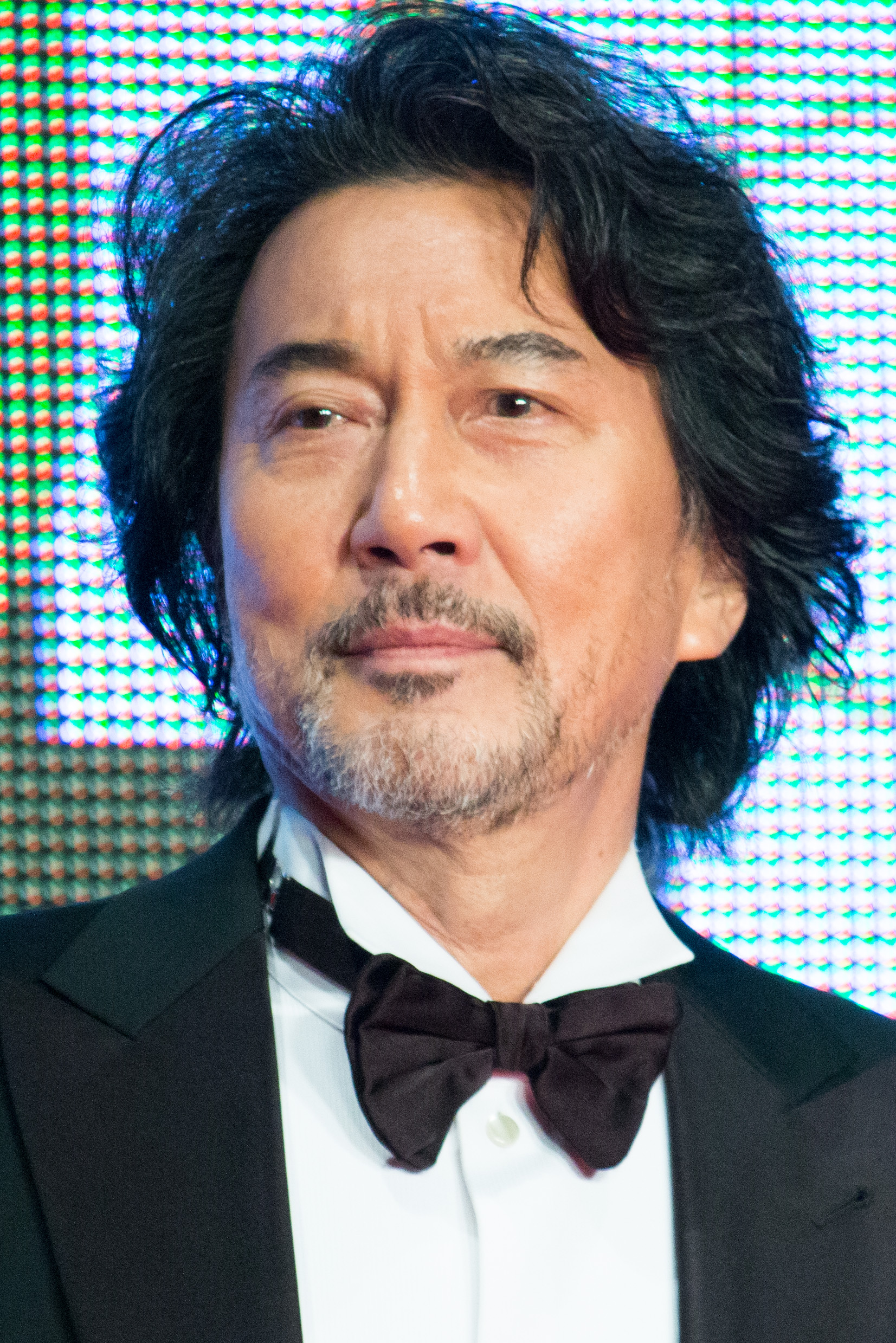
Koji Yakusho's performance received universal acclaim with him winning the Cannes Film Festival Award For Best Actor.

On the review aggregator website Rotten Tomatoes, the film holds an approval rating of 96% based on 184 reviews, with an average rating of 8.3/10. The website's critics consensus reads, "An absorbing slice-of-life drama led by a remarkable Kôji Yakusho performance, Perfect Days adds a quietly soaring gem to director/co-writer Wim Wenders' estimable filmography." Metacritic, which uses a weighted average, assigned the film a score of 80 out of 100, based on 38 critics, indicating "generally favorable" reviews.

Hsin Wang of FIPRESCI described the film as Wim Wenders' lifetime masterpiece. German film journalist Dieter Oßwald wrote, "With furious ease, Wenders succeeds in making a rather perfect film." Wendy Ide of The Guardian called Perfect Days "Wim Wenders's best film in years", praising the film for being "as much a manifesto as a movie...advocating not just a new way of looking, but of new way of living."

Kōji Yakusho's performance drew critical acclaim, with Ide praising him for his ability to "convey an extraordinarily rich interior life, almost entirely without leaning on dialogue." Mansur Zeynalov of Taste of Cinema considered that he was disregarded for an Academy Award for Best Actor nomination.

In 2025, it ranked number 83 on the "Readers' Choice" edition of The New York Times' list of "The 100 Best Movies of the 21st Century".

=== Accolades ===
Award or film festival	Date of ceremony	Category	Recipient(s)	Result	Ref.
AARP Movies for Grownups Awards	17 January 2024	Best Foreign Language Film	Perfect Days	Nominated	
Academy Awards	10 March 2024	Best International Feature Film	Perfect Days	Nominated	
Asia Pacific Screen Awards	3 November 2023	Best Film	Perfect Days	Won	
Asia Pacific Screen Awards	3 November 2023	Best Performance	Kōji Yakusho	Nominated	
Asian Film Awards	10 March 2024	Best Film	Perfect Days	Nominated	
Asian Film Awards	10 March 2024	Best Actor	Kōji Yakusho	Won	
Astra Film and Creative Arts Awards	6 January 2024	Best International Feature	Perfect Days	Nominated	
Astra Film and Creative Arts Awards	6 January 2024	Best International Filmmaker	Wim Wenders	Nominated	
Astra Film and Creative Arts Awards	6 January 2024	Best International Actor	Kōji Yakusho	Nominated	
Blue Ribbon Awards	February 2024	Best Film	Perfect Days	Nominated	
Blue Ribbon Awards	February 2024	Best Actor	Kōji Yakusho	Nominated	
Belgian Film Critics Association	6 January 2024	Grand Prix	Perfect Days	Nominated	
Boston Society of Film Critics Awards	10 December 2023	Best Actor	Kōji Yakusho	Runner-up (Note: Tied with Cillian Murphy for Oppenheimer)	
Cannes Film Festival	27 May 2023	Palme d'Or	Wim Wenders	Nominated	
Cannes Film Festival	27 May 2023	Best Actor	Kōji Yakusho	Won	
Cannes Film Festival	27 May 2023	Prize of the Ecumenical Jury	Wim Wenders	Won	
César Awards	23 February 2024	Best Foreign Film	Perfect Days	Nominated	
Critics' Choice Movie Awards	14 January 2024	Best Foreign Language Film	Perfect Days	Nominated	
Houston Film Critics Society	22 January 2024	Best Foreign Language Feature	Perfect Days	Nominated	
IndieWire Critics Poll	11 December 2023	Best Performance	Kōji Yakusho	10th Place (Note: Tied with Glenn Howerton for BlackBerry, Benoit Magimel for Pacifiction, and Franz Rogowski for Passages)	
IndieWire Critics Poll	11 December 2023	Best International Film	Perfect Days	4th Place	
International Cinephile Society	11 February 2024	Best Actor	Kōji Yakusho	Nominated	
Japan Academy Film Prize	8 March 2024	Picture of the Year	Perfect Days	Nominated	
Japan Academy Film Prize	8 March 2024	Director of the Year	Wim Wenders	Won	
Japan Academy Film Prize	8 March 2024	Outstanding Performance by an Actor in a Leading Role	Kōji Yakusho	Won	
Kinema Junpo Awards	18 February 2024	Best Actor	Kōji Yakusho	Won	
Georgia Film Critics Association Awards	5 January 2024	Best International Film	Perfect Days	Nominated	
Manaki Brothers Film Festival	29 September 2023	Golden Camera 300	Franz Lustig	Nominated	
Miskolc International Film Festival	9 September 2023	Emeric Pressburger Prize for Best Feature Film	Perfect Days	Nominated	
Montclair Film Festival	30 October 2023	Junior Jury	Perfect Days	Won	
North Texas Film Critics Association	18 December 2023	Best Foreign Language Film	Perfect Days	Nominated	
San Francisco Bay Area Film Critics Circle Awards	9 January 2024	Best International Feature Film	Perfect Days	Nominated	
Seattle Film Critics Society Awards	8 January 2024	Best Actor in a Leading Role	Kōji Yakusho	Nominated	
St. Louis Film Critics Association	17 December 2023	Best International Film	Perfect Days	Nominated	
Toronto Film Critics Association	17 December 2023	Outstanding Lead Performance	Kōji Yakusho	Runner-up (Note: Tied with Paul Giamatti for The Holdovers, Andrew Scott for All of Us Strangers, and Emma Stone for Poor Things)	
Washington D.C. Area Film Critics Association Awards	10 December 2023	Best Foreign Language Film	Perfect Days	Nominated	

== Impact ==
Following the theatrical release of Perfect Days in international markets, interest in Japanese public facilities, particularly those of the Tokyo Toilet Project in Shibuya, has surged.

== See also ==
- Cinema of Japan
- List of submissions to the 96th Academy Awards for Best International Feature Film
- List of Japanese submissions for the Academy Award for Best International Feature Film
