= Comptoir des Cotonniers =

French fashion brand

- Industry: Fashion
- Key people: Nancy Pedot (CEO); Lars Nilsson (artistic director)
- Owner: Fast Retailing

Comptoir des Cotonniers is a French contemporary fashion brand established in 1995. Comptoirs des Cotonniers was bought by Fast Retailing Group in 2005.

== History ==
Founded in 1995 by Tony and Georgette Elicha in Toulouse, Comptoir des Cotonniers stemmed from the idea of mothers and daughters borrowing one another’s clothes, originally with matching collections for women and children. The family sold the company after a decade, with the children subsequently founding The Kooples.

In November 2013, Fast Retailing appointed Nancy Pedot the new CEO of Comptoir des Cotonniers and Princesse Tam Tam.

On 2 July 2025, Fast Retailing France, owner of the Comptoir des Cotonniers and Princesse Tam Tam brands, was placed into receivership, blaming "the continuing financial deterioration" as a result of its filing.

== Creative directors ==
- 2013: Amélie Gillier
- 2014–2016: Anne Valérie Hash
