= GU (retailer) =

Japanese clothing brand

G.U. Co., Ltd.
- Native name: 株式会社ジーユー
- Romanized name: Kabushikigaisha Jīyū
- Type: KK
- Industry: Fashion retail
- Founded: 21 February 1973; 53 years ago
- Headquarters: Minato, Tokyo, Japan
- Number of locations: 478 (28 February 2025)
- Parent: Fast Retailing
- Website: gu-global.com

GU (Japanese: ジーユー, Hepburn: jīyū) is a Japanese discount casual wear designer, manufacturer, and retailer. It is a wholly owned subsidiary of Fast Retailing, the parent company of Uniqlo. The name is a pun of the word jiyū (自由), meaning "liberty, freedom" and its slogan means "more freedom in fashion" (ファッションを、もっと自由に, fasshon o, motto jiyū ni). Its signature product is a pair of jeans costing 990 Japanese yen ($9.02 USD), though they ceased production in January 2014. As of 28 February 2025, there are 478 locations globally. Francesco Risso has been appointed creative director of GU.

== History ==
GU opened its first shop in Chiba Prefecture in October 2006 as a more affordable concept in fashion than Uniqlo. In September 2013, the company opened its first overseas shop in Shanghai, later expanding to Taiwan in September 2014 and South Korea in September 2018. In October 2022, GU opened its first pop-up shop in the United States in New York City, selecting SoHo, Manhattan to test out the North American market. GU opened its first permanent global flagship store on 19 September 2024, directly opposite from its former location. The pop-up store closed on 31 July 2024, shortly before the flagship store's grand opening.

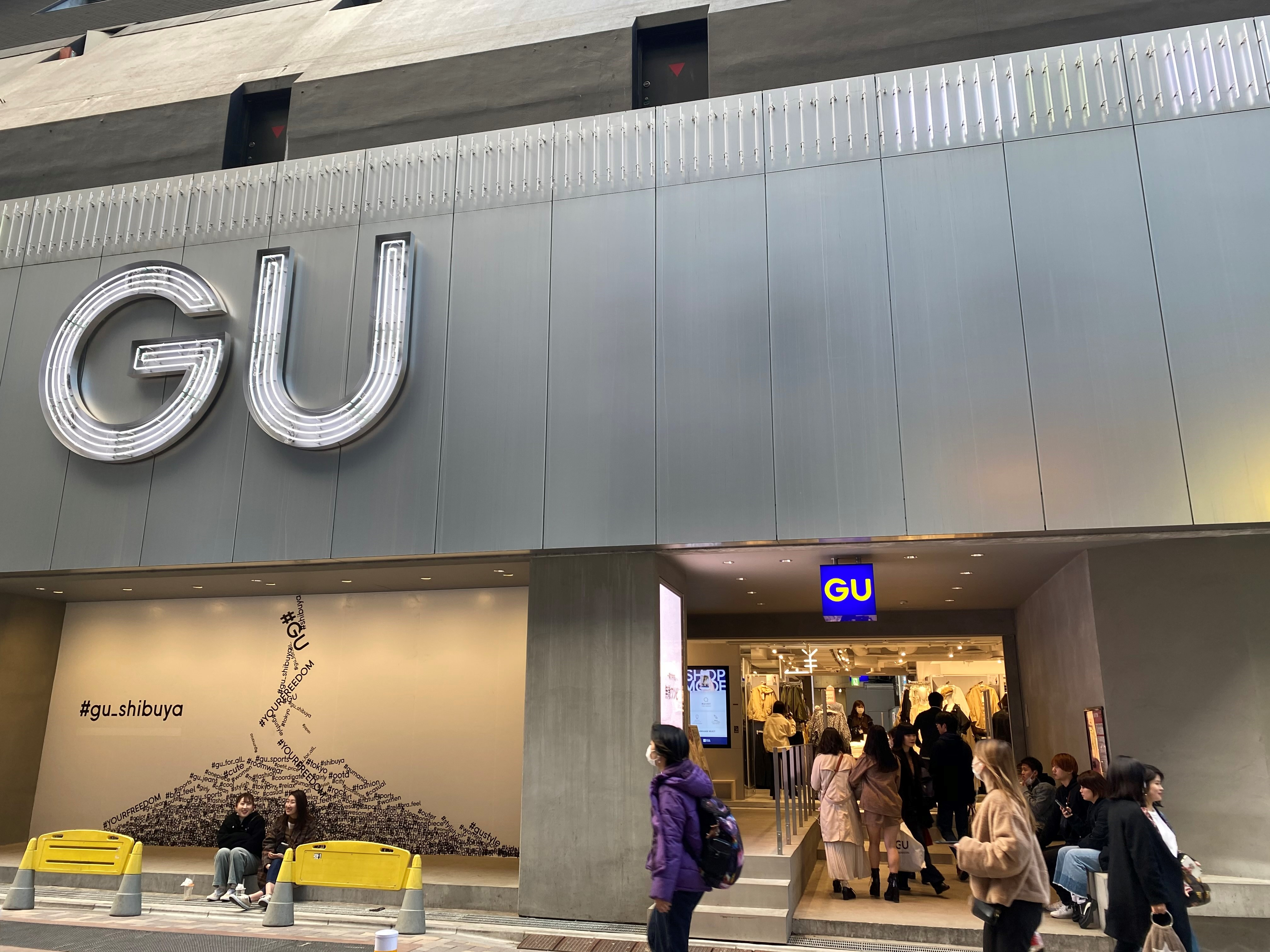
GU Shibuya

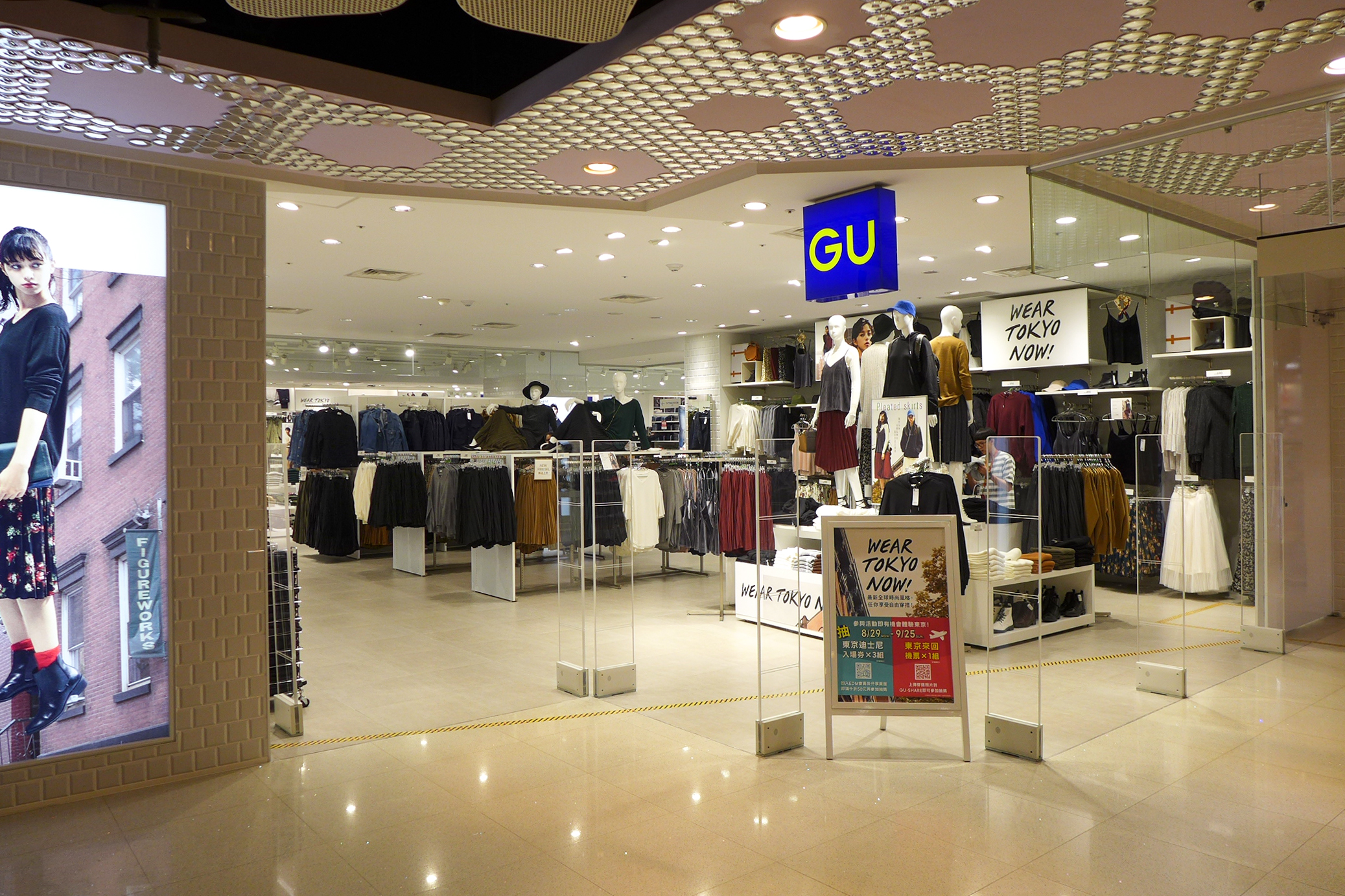
GU Store in Taipei 2016
