= Fast Retailing =

Japanese multinational retail holding company

Fast Retailing Co., Ltd.
- Native name: 株式会社ファーストリテイリング
- Romanized name: Kabushikigaisha Fāsutoriteiringu
- Type: Public
- Traded as: TYO: 9983; SEHK: 6288; TOPIX Large 70 Component
- ISIN: JP3802300008
- Industry: Retail
- Founded: As Men’s Shop Ogori Shoji: March 1949; 77 years ago; As Fast Retailing: September 1991; 35 years ago
- Founders: Hitoshi Yanai; Tadashi Yanai
- Headquarters: Yamaguchi, Yamaguchi Prefecture, Japan
- Area served: Worldwide
- Key people: Tadashi Yanai; (Founder, president & CEO); Shimpei Otani (CTO); Makoto Hoketsu (CIO)
- Products: Clothing, accessories
- Revenue: ▲¥2,130 billion (FY2018)
- Operating income: ▲¥236 billion (FY2018)
- Net income: ▲¥1,050 billion (FY2018)
- Total assets: ▲¥1,953 billion (FY2018)
- Number of employees: 52,839 (2018)
- Subsidiaries: Comptoir des Cotonniers; Helmut Lang; GU; J Brand; Princesse Tam-Tam; Theory; Uniqlo
- Website: www.fastretailing.com/eng

Fast Retailing Co., Ltd. (Japanese: 株式会社ファーストリテイリング, Hepburn: Kabushikigaisha Fāsutoriteiringu) is a public Japanese multinational retail holding company. In addition to its primary subsidiary Uniqlo, it owns several other brands, including J Brand, Comptoir des Cotonniers, GU, Princesse tam.tam, and Theory.

== History ==
The company was founded as Men's Shop Ogori Shoji in 1949, and formally incorporated as Ogōri Shōji Co., Ltd. in 1963 by Hitoshi Yanai.

In 1984, the company, which ran a menswear store in Ube, Yamaguchi, opened a new casual-wear store named Unique Clothing Warehouse in Hiroshima; this was the forebear of Uniqlo.

In September 1991, Ogori Shoji changed its name to Fast Retailing Co., Ltd., and was listed on the Hiroshima Stock Exchange in July 1994.

In February 1999, it was listed on the first section (large companies) of the Tokyo Stock Exchange.

The company also owns the American brand Theory; In 2004, Fast Retailing acquired "an equity stake in Link Theory Holdings Co., Ltd., the marketer of the Theory and Helmut Lang apparel brands". It acquired the rest of the company in 2009.

In 2007, it unsuccessfully offered a bid of US$900,000,000 for Barneys New York department store to the Jones Apparel Group.

In 2012, the company purchased an 80% stake of premium denim company J Brand for US$290,000,000, plus US$10,000,000 in advisory legal fees.

== Senior leadership ==
=== Chairman ===
1. Hitoshi Yanai (1963–1984)
2. Tadashi Yanai (1984–present)

=== CEO ===
1. Hitoshi Yanai (1963–1984)
2. Tadashi Yanai (1984–present)

=== President ===
1. Hitoshi Yanai (1963–1984)
2. Tadashi Yanai (1984–2002)
3. Tadashi Yanai (2005–present); second term
