= J Brand =

American denim clothing company

- Industry: Fashion
- Founder: Jeff Rudes
- Headquarters: Los Angeles, California
- Products: Women's and Men's Denim, Ready-To-Wear
- Number of employees: 150-200
- Parent: Fast Retailing
- Website: jbrandjeans.com

J Brand is an American denim clothing company founded in 2004 in Los Angeles, California.

== History ==
J Brand was co-founded by Jeff Rudes in 2004. In 2005, J Brand officially launched at the Ron Herman Melrose Denim Bar in Los Angeles, California.

At its inception, the company only offered women's denim. Their 811 Skinny style was popular. Their most famous skinny is the Houlihan Cargo Pant, named for the M*A*S*H character Hot Lips Houlihan and originally perceived as a novelty item. Frank Doroff, vice chairman of Bloomingdales department stores said it was their "best selling pant", selling thousands. J Brand sold more than 300,000 pairs.

In late 2012, Fast Retailing announced they had bought 80% of J Brand for $290 million.

== Collaborations ==
J Brand has worked with fashion designers such as Christopher Kane, Simone Rocha, Henry Duarte, Erdem, Meadham Kirchhoff, Peter Pilotto, Richard Nicoll, and Proenza Schouler.

J Brand has worked with creative director Karl Templer and photographer Craig McDean for their Fall 2012, Spring 2013, and Fall 2013 ad campaigns.

== See also ==
- J Brand
- List of denim jeans brands
