= Ubu Love =

Debut single by Japanese boy band Naniwa Danshi

- Regular edition

Single by Naniwa Danshi

from the album 1st Love
- A-side: "Ubu Love"
- B-side: "Naniwa'n Way"; "Yume Watashi"; "Starting Bell"; "What a funky time!!"; "Kimi Dake o Nigasanai"; "Bokura no I Love You"
- Released: November 12, 2021
- Genre: J-pop
- Length: 3:47
- Label: J Storm
- Songwriters: Satoru Kurihara, Shingo Kubota
- Producer: Tadayoshi Okura

Naniwa Danshi singles chronology
"Ubu Love" (2021)	"The Answer / Sachiare" (2022)

Music video
- "Ubu Love" on YouTube "Naniwa'n Way" on YouTube

"Ubu Love" (初心LOVE, Uburabu) is the debut single by Japanese boy band Naniwa Danshi. It was released on November 12, 2021, by J Storm.

The title track was used as one of the theme songs for the TV Asahi drama My Love Mix-Up!, co-starring member Shunsuke Michieda and Ren Meguro of Snow Man.

== Background and release ==
Naniwa Danshi announced their CD debut on July 28, 2021, during a concert held at Yokohama Arena, a date informally known as "Naniwa Day" (なにわの日) in Japan, based on Japanese wordplay in which the numbers 7 (na), 2 (ni), and 8 (wa) form "Naniwa". The debut single, titled "Ubu Love" (初心LOVE), was officially revealed on September 17, 2021. The single was released on November 12, 2021, by J Storm.

"Ubu Love" served as one of the theme songs for the TV Asahi drama My Love Mix-Up!, starring member Shunsuke Michieda alongside Ren Meguro of Snow Man. The song was used as a double theme song together with Snow Man's "Secret Touch".

The single was released in multiple editions, including two limited editions (CD+DVD/Blu-ray), a regular edition, and several retailer-exclusive versions, each featuring different cover artwork and bonus content. The regular edition includes "Yume Watashi", a song originally performed during the group's Kansai Johnny's Jr. era, which was also used as the theme song for the 2021 ABC Summer High School Baseball broadcast and Nettō Kōshien.

The music video for "Ubu Love", directed by Mai Sakai, was released on October 19, 2021. It depicts the members working at a gas station and falling in love at first sight, expressing youthful romance through dance performance. Promotional campaigns for the song included user-participation dance challenges on YouTube Shorts and TikTok. The song gained significant traction on TikTok, surpassing 500 million total views within 37 days, setting a record among domestic artists.

To commemorate the release, an online live streaming event for CD purchasers was held on December 25, 2021. The song later won the Best Drama Song award at the 110th Television Drama Academy Awards. It was also performed at the 73rd NHK Kōhaku Uta Gassen in 2022.

In December 2023, the music video surpassed 100 million views on YouTube, marking a major milestone for the group. In February 2026, the song exceeded 100 million cumulative streams on Oricon, becoming the group's first work to reach this milestone.

== Commercial performance ==
"Ubu Love" debuted at number one on the Oricon Weekly Singles Chart dated November 22, 2021, selling 706,000 copies in its first week. It became the best-selling debut single of the year in Japan.

On Billboard Japan, the single sold 632,655 copies in its first week and topped both the Top Singles Sales chart and the Japan Hot 100. It remained at number one on the Japan Hot 100 for two consecutive weeks, outperforming competing releases including "Mirai e/ReBorn" by NEWS.

The single also achieved strong performance across multiple platforms, including topping the Oricon monthly singles chart for November 2021 and ranking third on the Oricon Year-end Singles Chart of 2021. On Billboard Japan, it ranked sixth on the year-end Top Singles Sales chart.

In January 2022, the single returned to number one on both the Oricon Weekly Singles Chart and Billboard Japan Top Singles Sales chart.

In February 2026, "Ubu Love" surpassed 100 million cumulative streams on the Oricon streaming chart, becoming Naniwa Danshi's first song to reach this milestone.

== Charts ==
=== Weekly charts ===
Chart (2021)	Peak position
Japan (Oricon Singles Chart)	1
Japan (Billboard Japan Hot 100)	1
Japan (Billboard Japan Top Singles Sales)	1

=== Year-end charts ===
Chart (2021)	Position
Japan (Oricon Singles Chart)	3
Japan (Billboard Japan Top Singles Sales)	6

== Certifications ==
Region	Certification	Sales
Japan (RIAJ)	3× Platinum	750,000+

== Track listing ==
=== Limited edition 1 ===
No.	Title	Length
1	"Ubu Love"	3:47
2	"Naniwa'n Way"	4:06
3	"What a funky time!!"	3:58
4	"Ubu Love" (instrumental)	3:47
5	"Naniwa'n Way" (instrumental)	4:06
6	"What a funky time!!" (instrumental)	3:55

=== Limited edition 2 ===
No.	Title	Length
1	"Ubu Love"	3:47
2	"Naniwa'n Way"	4:06
3	"Kimi Dake o Nigasanai"	4:01
4	"Ubu Love" (instrumental)	3:47
5	"Naniwa'n Way" (instrumental)	4:06
6	"Kimi Dake o Nigasanai" (instrumental)	3:59

=== Regular edition ===
No.	Title	Length
1	"Ubu Love"	3:47
2	"Naniwa'n Way"	4:07
3	"Yume Watashi"	4:57
4	"Starting Bell"	4:10

=== Johnnys' ISLAND STORE online edition ===
No.	Title	Length
1	"Ubu Love"	3:47
2	"Naniwa'n Way"	4:06
3	"Bokura no I Love You"	4:29

=== Loppi / HMV limited edition ===
No.	Title	Length
1	"Ubu Love"	3:49
2	"Ubu Love" (instrumental)	3:45
