= Uniqlo =

Japanese casual-wear brand and retailer

Uniqlo Co., Ltd.

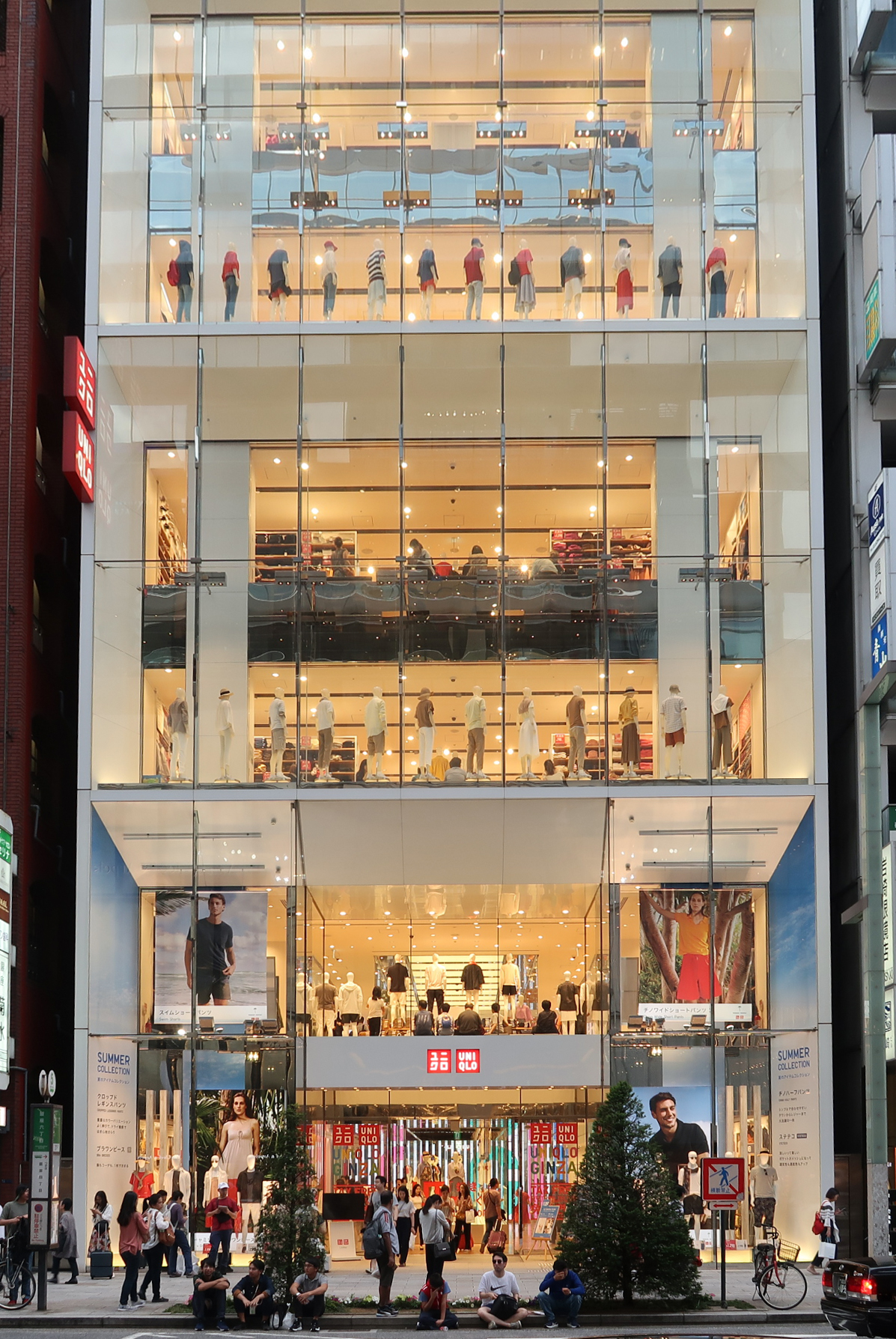
- Uniqlo flagship store in Ginza, Japan
- Native name: 株式会社ユニクロ
- Formerly: Sun Road Co., Ltd.
- Type: Subsidiary
- Industry: Fashion
- Founded: 2 September 1974; 52 years ago
- Headquarters: 10717-1 Sayama, Yamaguchi City, Yamaguchi 754-0894, Japan
- Area served: Worldwide
- Key people: Tadashi Yanai (chairman); Daisuke Tsukagoshi (president and CEO)
- Products: Clothing; fashion accessories
- Number of employees: 30,000 (2023)
- Parent: Fast Retailing
- Website: uniqlo.com

Uniqlo Co., Ltd. (株式会社ユニクロ, Kabushiki-gaisha Yunikuro), commonly known as Uniqlo (US: /ˈjuː.ni.kloʊ/ YOO-nee-kloh; Japanese pronunciation: [jɯnikɯɾo]), is a Japanese casual-wear designer and retailer and a wholly owned subsidiary of Fast Retailing. The Uniqlo brand originated in 1984, when Fast Retailing's predecessor, Ogori Shoji, opened the first Uniqlo store in Hiroshima. The present Uniqlo Co., Ltd. was established in 1974 as Sun Road Co., Ltd. (サンロード株式会社) and took its current name in 2005 when Fast Retailing transferred its domestic Uniqlo operations to the company.

As of 31 August 2026 Uniqlo operated 2,499 stores worldwide, including 782 in Japan and 1,717 outside Japan. Its business model integrates product planning, material procurement, production, distribution, and retailing, and the company markets its clothing under the LifeWear concept, which emphasizes simple, functional, and continually improved everyday clothing. Technology has played an important role in this model, ranging from functional-material development to RFID-enabled logistics automation, digital demand forecasting, and the analysis of customer feedback using artificial intelligence.

Uniqlo began expanding outside Japan with stores in the United Kingdom in 2001 and subsequently developed a large retail presence in East and Southeast Asia, Europe, North America, and other markets. Among its best-known product lines are Heattech and Airism, developed through its long-running relationship with Toray Industries.

== History ==
=== Origins and development in Japan ===
Men's Shop Ogori Shoji was founded in Ube, Yamaguchi, in March 1949. Ogori Shoji Co., Ltd. was incorporated in May 1963. Tadashi Yanai joined the company in 1972.

In June 1984, with Yanai at the helm, Ogori Shoji opened its first Uniqlo store in Fukuro-machi, Naka-ku, Hiroshima. The first roadside Uniqlo store opened in Yamanota, Shimonoseki, Yamaguchi Prefecture, the following year and became a model for subsequent stores.

The brand name was originally intended as an abbreviation of "unique clothing". In 1988, during work in Hong Kong to register the brand, the "C" in the intended abbreviation was reportedly misread as a "Q". Yanai preferred the resulting spelling and subsequently adopted "Uniqlo" as the brand name throughout Japan.

In September 1991, Ogori Shoji changed its corporate name to Fast Retailing. By 1994, the retail network had grown to more than 100 stores, and Fast Retailing listed its shares on the Hiroshima Stock Exchange in July of that year.

In the late 1990s, the company increasingly developed the specialty store retailer of private label apparel (SPA) model, integrating product planning and development with production and retailing. A fleece campaign launched in 1998 attracted widespread attention and contributed to the brand's rapid growth. In November 1998, the first urban Uniqlo store opened in the Harajuku district of Tokyo. Uniqlo launched its online store in October 2000.

=== International expansion ===
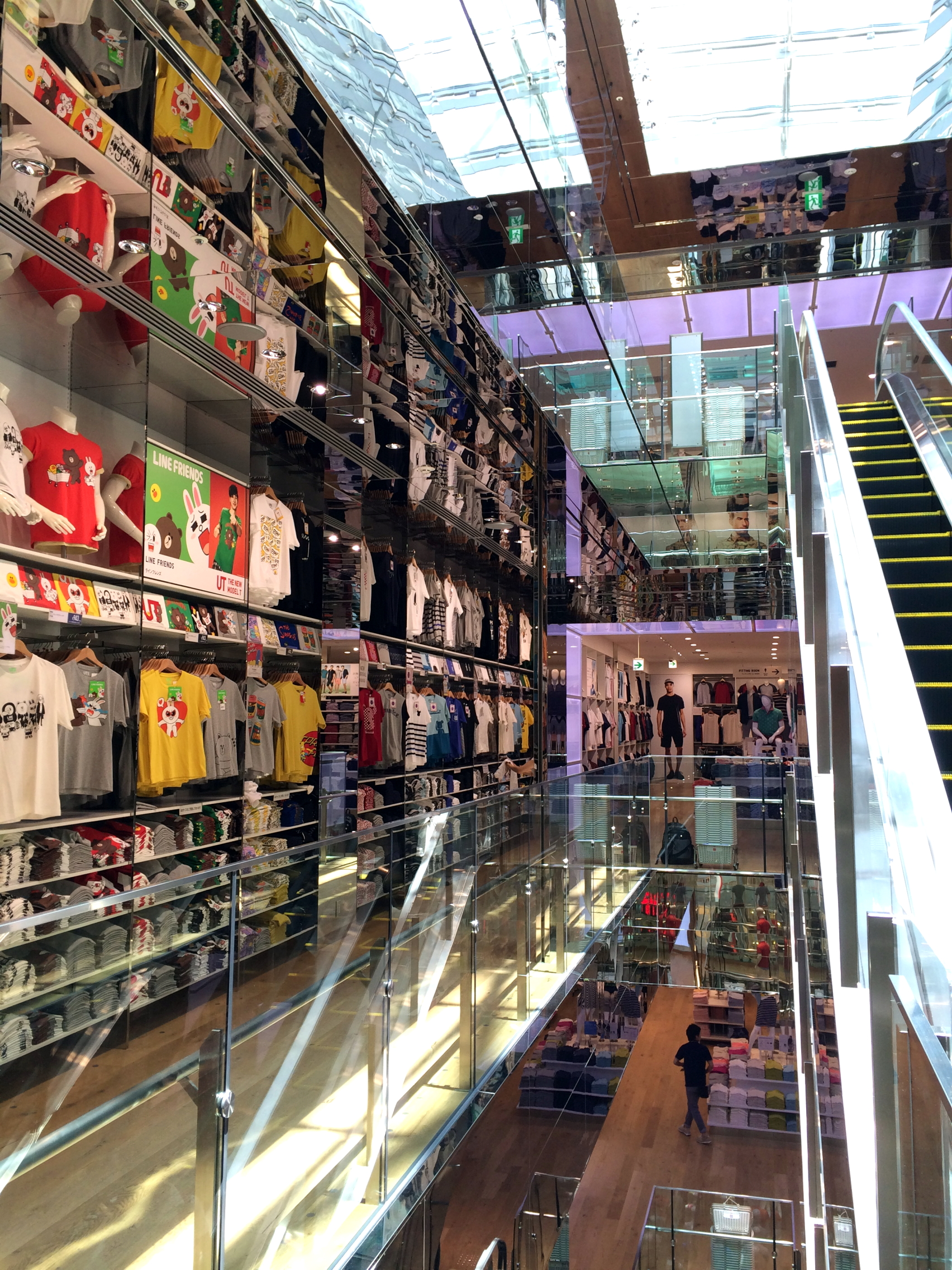
Interior of a Uniqlo flagship store in Shinsaibashi, Osaka

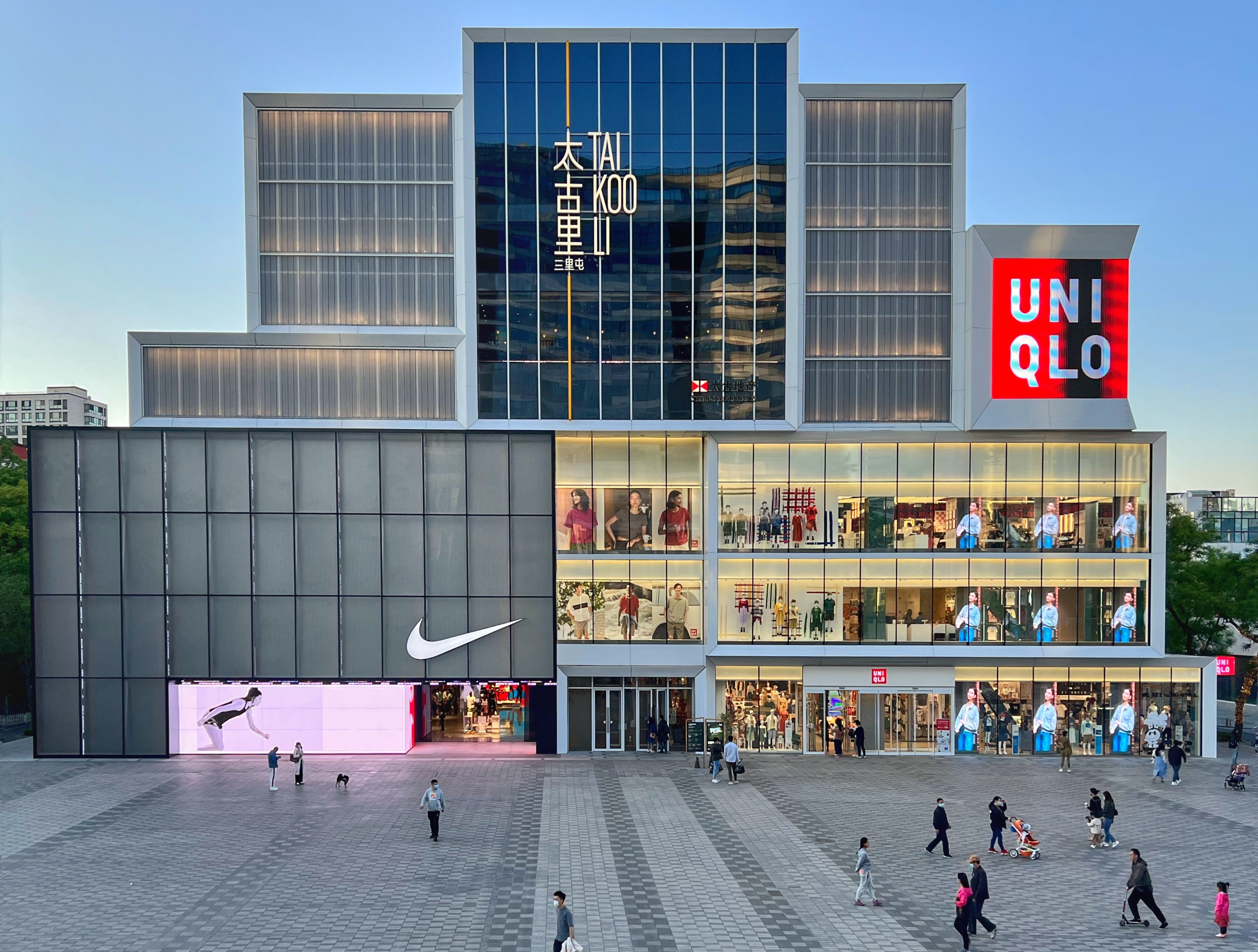
Uniqlo in Sanlitun, Beijing

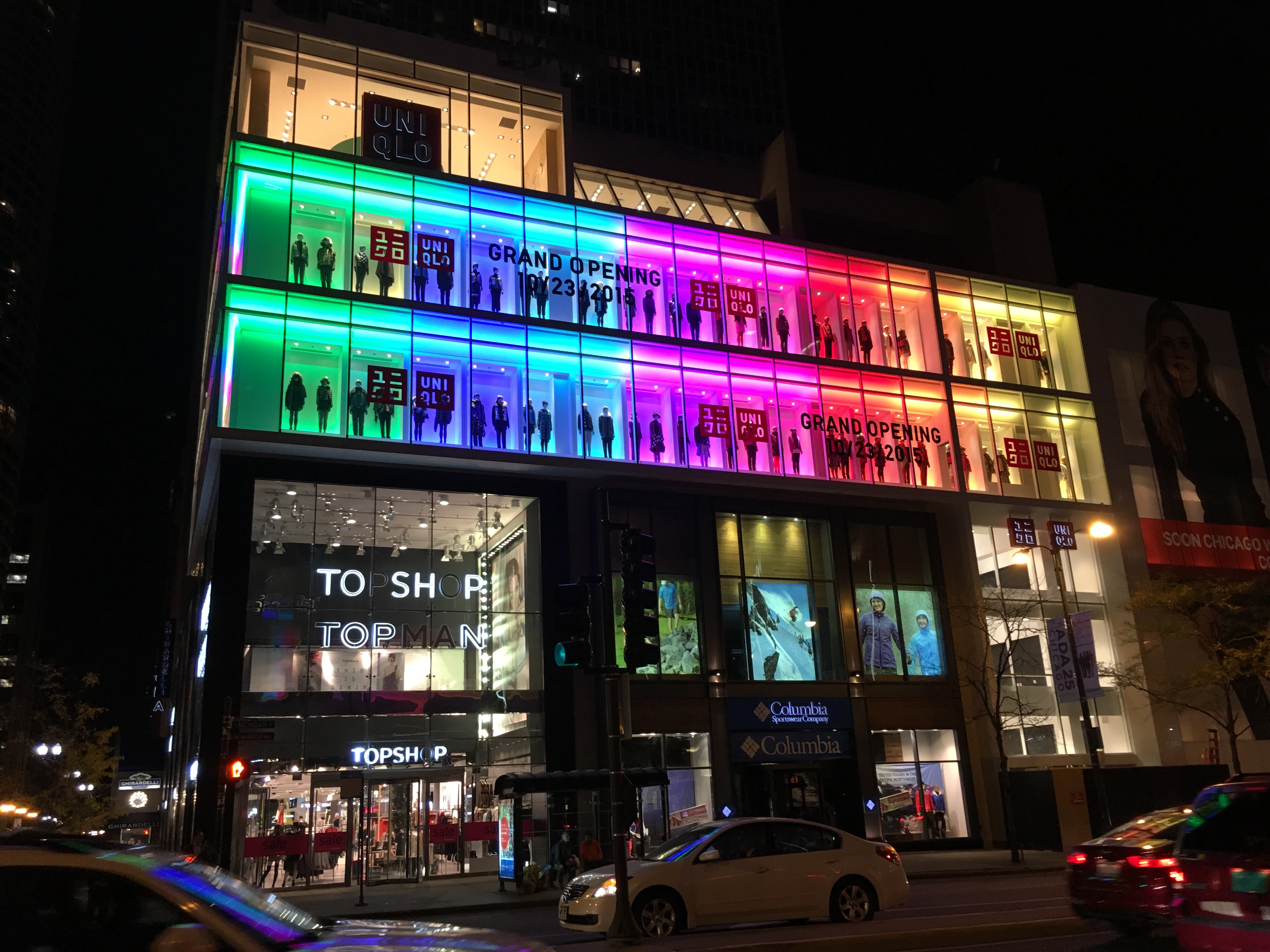
Uniqlo's former flagship store on the Magnificent Mile in Chicago

Uniqlo's first stores outside Japan opened in London in September 2001. The initial British expansion was unsuccessful, and most of the company's UK stores were closed in 2003.

The company entered mainland China in September 2002 with a store in Shanghai. In September 2005, Uniqlo entered South Korea, the United States, and Hong Kong. Its first US stores, in New Jersey, closed in 2006, but in November of that year Uniqlo opened its first global flagship store in SoHo, Manhattan.

Uniqlo entered France in December 2007. During the 2008 financial crisis, its sales in Japan rose as consumers sought lower-priced clothing.

During the following decade, Uniqlo expanded rapidly across East and Southeast Asia. It opened its first Singapore store in 2009, followed by Malaysia and Taiwan in 2010, Thailand in 2011, the Philippines in 2012, Indonesia in 2013, and Vietnam in 2019.

Uniqlo entered Russia on 2 April 2010 with the opening of the UNIQLO ATRIUM store in Moscow. Its operations in the country were suspended on March 21, 2022.

The company entered Australia on 16 April 2014 with its first store at Emporium Melbourne. It entered Germany in the same year with a global flagship store in Berlin. Belgium followed in 2015 and Canada in 2016.

On 20 September 2017, Uniqlo opened its first Spanish store, on Passeig de Gràcia in Barcelona. It entered Sweden and the Netherlands in 2018, and Denmark and Italy in 2019.

Uniqlo opened its first store in India at Ambience Mall Vasant Kunj in New Delhi on 4 October 2019.

In 2022, Uniqlo established its first physical presence in Poland with a limited-period pop-up store in Warsaw. Its first permanent store in Poland opened in Warsaw in September 2024.

On 25 April 2024, the company opened its first store in Scotland, on Princes Street in Edinburgh. Uniqlo continued to expand its store network in Europe and North America during the mid-2020s.

== Business model and products ==
=== LifeWear and SPA ===
Uniqlo operates using the SPA model, directly managing major stages from product planning and material procurement through production, distribution, and retailing. The company describes its clothing philosophy as LifeWear, focusing on everyday clothing designed to combine practicality, quality, and simplicity and to be continually improved in response to customer feedback.

Rather than relying primarily on rapidly changing fashion trends, Uniqlo has placed particular emphasis on core and functional products that remain in its assortment across multiple seasons. Nevertheless, Uniqlo has frequently been classified as part of the fast fashion industry, while commentators have also distinguished its business model from more trend-driven fast-fashion retailers.

The Round Mini Shoulder Bag, introduced in 2022, became a commercial success after gaining widespread popularity on social media, particularly TikTok. In 2023, The Guardian reported that it had become Uniqlo's best-selling bag.

=== Technology and digital transformation ===
Technology has been a significant part of Uniqlo's product development, supply chain, and retail operations. In 2017, Fast Retailing launched the Ariake Project, an initiative intended to transform the group into what it calls a "digital consumer retail company". The project was designed to connect customer information with product planning, production, distribution, and retailing and to use digital technology to improve demand forecasting and inventory control.

Fast Retailing introduced radio-frequency identification (RFID) tags on Uniqlo products as part of its logistics reforms. At its Ariake warehouse, RFID enabled the automation of processes including stock receipt, sorting, picking, and inspection. A fully automated Ariake warehouse dedicated to online sales became operational in fall 2018, developed in cooperation with logistics-equipment manufacturer Daifuku.

Fast Retailing has also worked with technology companies on data analysis and demand forecasting. In 2018, it expanded its collaboration with Google Cloud, using machine learning and image-recognition technologies to analyze product trends and forecast demand using customer feedback, behavioral data, external information, and sales data.

Customer information is also incorporated into product and service development. Fast Retailing stated in 2026 that Uniqlo Customer Centers across its markets received more than 39 million pieces of customer feedback annually and that artificial intelligence was being used to increase the speed and accuracy with which this information was analyzed and shared with product teams and stores.

Technology has also been used in garment manufacturing. Uniqlo's 3D Knit products use Shima Seiki's WHOLEGARMENT knitting technology, which produces three-dimensional knitwear without conventional sewn seams.

=== Toray partnership and functional clothing ===
Uniqlo and Toray Industries began doing business together in 1999 in the field of thermal outerwear. Toray established a department dedicated to Uniqlo in 2000.

In 2003, Uniqlo introduced Heattech, a line of functional winter innerwear developed with Toray. The two companies formalized their relationship in 2006 through a strategic partnership covering material development, production, and supply. In 2015, the third phase of the partnership explicitly included digitalization, use of the Internet of things to create an end-to-end business model, and measures to reduce production lead times.

Fast Retailing reported in its 2023 integrated report that cumulative global Heattech sales from 2003 through 2022 had exceeded 1.5 billion units.

In 2012, Uniqlo introduced Airism, a summer innerwear line also developed in cooperation with Toray and designed around moisture management and quick-drying performance. The companies subsequently developed other functional clothing ranges, including products using advanced insulating and recycled materials.

=== Design and cultural collaborations ===
Fast Retailing signed a design consulting agreement for Uniqlo products with German fashion designer Jil Sander in March 2009. The collaboration produced the +J collection and continued until 2011. The +J collaboration was revived in November 2020, eleven years after the first collection was launched.

Uniqlo began a graphic T-shirt project in 2003. In 2007, it relaunched the project as UT, a T-shirt-focused brand under the creative direction of Kashiwa Sato. UT has featured designs and licensed works drawn from art and popular culture, including works associated with artists such as Andy Warhol, Pablo Picasso, and Keith Haring.

In 2015, Uniqlo collaborated with French designer Christophe Lemaire on the UNIQLO AND LEMAIRE collection. In 2016, Lemaire was appointed artistic director of the newly established Uniqlo Paris R&D Center, and the company launched Uniqlo U, a line developed by the center as an extension of the LifeWear concept. The Paris center is one of Uniqlo's research and development centers and works on product design while researching fashion trends, lifestyles, and new materials.

In September 2024, British designer Clare Waight Keller, who had previously designed the Uniqlo:C line, was appointed creative director of Uniqlo.

=== Marketing and sponsorships ===
Uniqlo has used athletes as Global Brand Ambassadors as part of its international marketing. In 2009, wheelchair tennis player Shingo Kunieda became the company's first Global Brand Ambassador. Japanese tennis player Kei Nishikori became a Global Brand Ambassador in 2011.

In July 2018, Uniqlo appointed Swiss tennis player Roger Federer as a Global Brand Ambassador. In February 2026, British tennis player Emma Raducanu was appointed a Global Brand Ambassador.

In March 2026, Uniqlo entered a partnership with the Los Angeles Dodgers under which the playing field at Dodger Stadium was branded "UNIQLO Field at Dodger Stadium". The Los Angeles Times reported that the naming-rights agreement ran for five years and was worth more than $125 million.

== Stores ==
Uniqlo stores by country as of 31 August 2026
Country	Number of stores
Mainland China	851
Japan	782 (Note: Includes 772 directly operated stores and 10 franchise stores.)
Hong Kong	35
Taiwan	72
South Korea	129
Singapore	29
Malaysia	60
Thailand	73
Philippines	80
Indonesia	77
Australia	40
Vietnam	32
India	20
United States	86
Canada	38
United Kingdom	24
France	30
Germany	13
Belgium	3
Spain	7
Sweden	3
Netherlands	6
Denmark	2
Italy	4
Luxembourg	1
Poland	2
Total	2,499

Russia is not listed in the Group Outlets table; Fast Retailing states that Uniqlo operations there are currently suspended.

== Criticism and controversies ==
=== Labor and sourcing practices ===
In May 2011, Shūkan Bunshun published a story alleging that Uniqlo had forced employees at its stores and factories in China to work long hours for low pay. Uniqlo sued the publisher, Bungeishunjū, for ¥220 million for libel, but was unsuccessful.

In January 2015, Students and Scholars Against Corporate Misbehaviour (SACOM), a Hong Kong-based labor-rights organization, reported alleged labor-rights violations at two factories operated by Uniqlo suppliers in China, including excessive working hours, low wages, and unsafe working conditions. Fast Retailing said that it had investigated the allegations and instructed the suppliers to improve working conditions. Workers at one supplier factory went on strike in June 2015 following a dispute over its closure and their employment. Subsequent investigations by labor-rights organizations reported that some problems remained unresolved, and a 2016 report raised further concerns about working conditions at supplier factories in China and Cambodia.

In 2019, former employees of Uniqlo stores in Australia alleged bullying, harassment, excessive working hours, and a toxic workplace culture.

In January 2021, US Customs and Border Protection blocked a shipment of Uniqlo shirts at the Port of Los Angeles over concerns relating to a US ban on cotton products associated with forced labor in Xinjiang. Fast Retailing challenged the decision, but its protest was denied.

In November 2024, Fast Retailing chairman and chief executive Tadashi Yanai told the BBC that Uniqlo did not use cotton from Xinjiang. His remarks generated criticism on Chinese social media, including calls by some users to boycott the brand. The Chinese government denies allegations by rights groups and the United States that forced labor and other human-rights abuses have occurred in Xinjiang. In December, the Xinjiang Cotton Association called on international brands, including Uniqlo, to resume using cotton from the region.

=== South Korea advertisement ===
In 2019, a Uniqlo advertisement became controversial in South Korea. In the original advertisement, an elderly woman responded to a question about what she had worn when she was young by saying that she could not remember that far back. The Korean subtitle rendered the response as referring specifically to events "over 80 years ago", prompting criticism that the wording appeared to trivialize the experiences of comfort women during Korea under Japanese rule. Uniqlo withdrew the advertisement in South Korea.

=== Russia ===
Following the Russian invasion of Ukraine in February 2022, Fast Retailing initially said that Uniqlo would continue operating in Russia, with Tadashi Yanai describing clothing as a "necessity of life". On 10 March, however, the company reversed its position and announced that it would temporarily suspend its Russian operations, citing operational difficulties and the worsening conflict. In May 2023, Fast Retailing said that the suspension remained in effect and that, with no foreseeable prospect of resuming operations, it had closed some stores in the country.
