= Sexy Zone (song) =

- Regular Edition

Single by Sexy Zone

from the album One Sexy Zone
- Language: Japanese
- Released: November 16, 2011
- Length: 5:08
- Label: Pony Canyon
- Composer: Kōji Makaino
- Lyricist: Satomi

Sexy Zone singles chronology
| "Sexy Zone" (2011) | "Lady Diamond" (2012) |

"Sexy Zone" is a song by Japanese idol group Sexy Zone. It was released on November 16, 2011, as its debut single under Pony Canyon. The song was written by Satomi and Kōji Makaino.

"Sexy Zone" was released in five editions: Regular Edition, Limited Editions A, B, C, and D. It ranked number one on both the Oricon Singles Chart and Billboard Japan Hot 100, making the quintet the youngest music act to debut atop the former. The single was certified platinum by the Recording Industry Association of Japan (RIAJ), denoting shipments of 250,000 units.

== Background ==
The formation of Sexy Zone was announced during a press conference on September 29, 2011, consisting of Kento Nakajima, Fuma Kikuchi, Shori Sato, So Matsushima, and Marius Yo. With an average age of 14.2 years, Sexy Zone became the youngest group announced by Johnny & Associates. Born in Germany, Yo also became the first non-native singer to debut under the agency.

== Release and promotion ==
Sexy Zone first performed "Sexy Zone" during the Kis-My-Ft2 with Johnny's Jr. show, where they performed in all-white tuxedos and a rose in hand. The quintet imitated promotions for the single by performing it on TV Asahi's Music Station beginning on November 11.

"Sexy Zone" was released on November 16, 2011, in five editions: Regular Edition; Limited Edition A with bonus DVD content that includes the music video for "Sexy Zone"; Limited Edition B with bonus DVD content that includes a "close-up version" of the music video; and Limited Edition C with bonus DVD content that includes off-shots and an interview movie. The track was used for the 2011 FIVB Volleyball Men's World Cup and 2011 FIVB Volleyball Women's World Cup.

== Commercial performance ==
On the issue dated November 16, 2011, "Sexy Zone" debuted at number one on Japan's national weekly Oricon Singles Chart, selling 172,925 copies in its first week. Sexy Zone became the youngest music act to top the chart with an average age of 14.4 years, surpassing the record of 14.6 years previously held by Yuma Nakayama w/B.I.Shadow when its single "Akuma na Koi" / "NYC" ranked number one in 2009. On Billboard Japan Hot 100, the song debuted at number 63 and topped the chart the following week.

"Sexy Zone" was certified platinum in November 2011 by the Recording Industry Association of Japan for shipments exceeding 250,000 units. According to Oricon's year-end report, the single sold 211,908 copies domestically and ranked number 30 on its list of best-selling singles. It also ranked at number 98 on the Billboard Japan Hot 100 Year End chart.

== Track listing ==
Regular Edition
| No. | Title | Lyrics | Music | Arrangement | Length |
|---|---|---|---|---|---|
| 1. | "Sexy Zone" | Satomi | Kōji Makaino | Chokkaku | 5:08 |
| 2. | "With You" | Kelly | Daichi, Samuli Laiho | Teppei Shimizu | 4:14 |
| 3. | "I See the Light (Bokutachi no Stage)" (I See the Light ～僕たちのステージ～) | Makoto Ahei, Joey Carbone | Joey Carbone | Motoki Funayama | 4:23 |
| 4. | "Sexy Zone" (Inst.) | | Kōji Makaino | Chokkaku | 5:08 |
| 5. | "With You" (Inst.) | | Daichi, Samuli Laiho | Teppei Shimizu | 4:14 |
| 6. | "I See the Light (Bokutachi no Stage)" (I See the Light ～僕たちのステージ～) (Inst.) | | Joey Carbone | Motoki Funayama | 4:19 |
| Total length: | | | | | 27:26 |

Limited Edition A, B, C
| No. | Title | Lyrics | Music | Arrangement | Length |
|---|---|---|---|---|---|
| 1. | "Sexy Zone" | Satomi | Kōji Makaino | Chokkaku | 5:08 |
| 2. | "With You" | Kelly | Daichi, Samuli Laiho | Teppei Shimizu | 4:14 |
| Total length: | | | | | 9:22 |

Limited Edition D
| No. | Title | Lyrics | Music | Arrangement | Length |
|---|---|---|---|---|---|
| 1. | "Sexy Zone" | Satomi | Kōji Makaino | Chokkaku | 5:08 |
| 2. | "With You" | Kelly | Daichi, Samuli Laiho | Teppei Shimizu | 4:14 |
| 3. | "Knock! Knock!! Knock!!!" | Chokkyu Murano | Samuel Waermö, Didrik Thott, Daichi | Hiroyuki Nakanishi | 3:18 |
| Total length: | | | | | 12:40 |

Limited Edition A – bonus DVD content
| No. | Title | Length |
|---|---|---|
| 1. | "Sexy Zone" (music clip) |

Limited Edition B – bonus DVD content
| No. | Title | Length |
|---|---|---|
| 1. | "Sexy Zone" (music clip (close-up ver.)) |

Limited Edition C – bonus DVD content
| No. | Title | Length |
|---|---|---|
| 1. | "Sexy Zone" (off shot & interview movie) |

== Charts ==
=== Weekly ===
| Chart (2011) | Peak position |
|---|---|
| Billboard Japan Hot 100 | 1 |
| Oricon Singles Chart | 1 |

=== Year-end ===
| Chart (2011) | Peak position |
|---|---|
| Billboard Japan Hot 100 | 98 |
| Oricon Singles Chart | 30 |
