= One Sexy Zone =

2012 debut studio album by Sexy Zone

- Regular Edition cover

Studio album by Sexy Zone
- Released: November 14, 2012
- Length: 70:03
- Language: Japanese
- Label: Pony Canyon

Sexy Zone chronology
One Sexy Zone (2012)	Sexy Second (2014)

Singles from One Sexy Zone
- 1. "Sexy Zone" Released: November 16, 2011; 2. "Lady Diamond" Released: April 11, 2012; 3. "Sexy Summer ni Yuki ga Furu" Released: October 3, 2012

One Sexy Zone (stylized as one Sexy Zone) is the debut studio album by Japanese idol group Sexy Zone. It was released on November 14, 2012, through Pony Canyon. The record was preceded by three singles: "Sexy Zone", "Lady Diamond", and "Sexy Summer ni Yuki ga Furu".

One Sexy Zone was released in four editions: Regular Edition, Limited Edition, Lawson-HMV Limited Edition, and Sexy Zone Shop Limited Edition. It ranked number one on the Oricon Singles Chart, where the quintet set the record for the youngest male group to top the chart with an average age of 15.4 years. The album also charted at number three on the Billboard Japan Top Album Sales chart. It was certified gold by the Recording Industry Association of Japan (RIAJ), denoting shipments of 100,000 units.

== Release and promotion ==
One Sexy Zone was released on November 14, 2012, in four editions: Regular Edition; Limited Edition with bonus DVD content that includes a special video of Sexy Zone in Las Vegas; Lawson-HMV Limited Edition with bonus DVD content that includes behind-the-scenes of the album jacket photoshoot and the music videos for the previously released singles "Sexy Zone", "Lady Diamond", and "Sexy Summer ni Yuki ga Furu"; and Sexy Zone Shop Limited Edition. Sexy Zone embarked on the New Year Arena Concert 2013 on January 2 and 3 at Osaka-jō Hall and January 4 to 6 at the Yokohama Arena.

== Commercial performance ==
On the issue dated November 26, 2012, One Sexy Zone debuted at number one on Japan's national weekly Oricon Albums Chart, selling 86,451 copies in its first week. With an average age of 15.4 years, Sexy Zone became the youngest male group to top the chart. The record was previously held by w-inds. when its album w-inds.: 1st Message (2001) ranked number one 10 years and 11 months prior; the average age of the group was 16.3 years. On the Billboard Japan Top Album chart, the album debuted at number three.

One Sexy Zone was certified gold at the end of the month by the Recording Industry Association of Japan for shipments exceeding 100,000 units. According to Oricon's year-end report, the album sold 95,421 copies domestically and ranked number 71 on its list of best-selling albums. It also ranked at number 91 on the Billboard Japan Top Albums Sales Year End chart.

== Track listing ==
Regular, Lawson-HMV Limited, Sexy Zone Shop Limited Editions
No.	Title	Lyrics	Music	Arrangement	Length
1.	"Kanzen My Way" (完全マイウェイ)	Zopp	Tomotaka Osumi	Suzuki "Daichi" Hideyuki	4:10
2.	"Silver Moon"	Jōya Uenaka	Susumu Kawaguchi, Christofer Erixon, Joakim Bjornberg	Makoto Ikuta	4:13
3.	"Lady Diamond" (Lady ダイヤモンド)	Gorō Matsui	Kōji Makaino	Motoki Funayama	4:53
4.	"If You Wanna Dance"	Shusui, Anders Dannvik	Shusui, Anders Dannvik	Hiroyuki Nakanishi	3:53
5.	"Rouge" (Fuma Kikuchi solo)	Kelly	Steven Lee, Drew Ryan Scott	Yoshimasa Kawabata	4:23
6.	"Game"	Kelly	Takuya Watanabe	mia	4:51
7.	"Kimi to... Milky Way" (君と･･･ Milky Way)	Gorō Matsui	Steven Lee	Tomoki Ishizuka	4:26
8.	"Sexy Zone"	Satomi	Kōji Makaino	Chokkaku	5:06
9.	"Don't Stop Sexy Boyz!" (by Sexy Boyz)	Genie Chuo	Andreas Carlsson, Samuel Waermö	Eiji Kawai	3:36
10.	"Kimi o Hanasanai Kimi o Hanarenai" (きみを離さない きみを離れない)	Shori Sato	Yosuke Okamura	Magokoro Ikuta	4:33
11.	"We Can Be One"	Satomi	Carl Utbult, Chris Meyer, Arrow	Carl Utbult	4:48
12.	"Teleportation" (Kento Nakajima solo)	Meg.Me	Steven Lee, Drew Ryan Scott	Eiji Kawai	4:03
13.	"Sexy Summer ni Yuki ga Furu" (Sexy Summer に雪が降る)	Yoshiko Miura	Janne Hyoty, Martin Grano	Suzuki "Daichi" Hideyuki	4:27
14.	"Suki Sugite" (スキすぎて)	Ami	Takeshi Isozaki	Teppei Shimizu	3:47
15.	"Kyō wa Arigatō" (今日はありがとう)	Yoshiko Miura	Takuya Harada, Samuli Laiho, Pessi Levanto	Yasumasa Satō	5:00
16.	"Yūki 100%" (勇気100%} (bonus track)	Gorō Matsui	Kōji Makaino	Kōji Makaino	3:54
Total length:					70:03

Limited Edition
No.	Title	Lyrics	Music	Arrangement	Length
16.	"Namae no Nai Omoi" (名前のない想い) (bonus track)	Daisuke Mori	Daisuke Mori	Daisuke Mori	5:26
Total length:					71:35

Limited Edition — bonus DVD content
No.	Title	Length
1.	"Special Video in Las Vegas"

Lawson-HMV Limited Edition — bonus DVD content
No.	Title	Length
1.	"1st Album Jacket Shooting Making & Singles Music Clip Collection" ("Sexy Zone", "Lady Diamond", "Sexy Summer ni Yuki ga Furu")

== Charts ==
=== Weekly ===
Chart (2012)	Peak position
Billboard Japan Top Albums Sales	3
Oricon Singles Chart	1

=== Year-end ===
Chart (2012)	Peak position
Billboard Japan Top Albums Sales	91
Oricon Albums Chart	71
