= Sexy Summer ni Yuki ga Furu =

- Regular Edition cover

Single by Sexy Zone

from the album One Sexy Zone
- Language: Japanese
- Released: October 3, 2012
- Length: 4:28
- Label: Pony Canyon
- Composers: Janne Hyoty; Martin Grano
- Lyricist: Yoshiko Miura

Sexy Zone singles chronology
"Lady Diamond" (2012)	"Sexy Summer ni Yuki ga Furu" (2012)	"Real Sexy!/Bad Boys" (2013)

"Sexy Summer ni Yuki ga Furu" (Sexy Summerに雪が降る) is a song by Japanese idol group Sexy Zone. It was released on October 3, 2012, as its third single under Pony Canyon. The song was written by Yoshiko Miura, Janne Hyoty, and Martin Grano.

"Sexy Summer ni Yuki ga Furu" was released in four editions: Regular Edition, Limited Editions A and B, and Venue Limited Summary 2012. It ranked number one on both the Oricon Singles Chart and Billboard Japan Hot 100. The single was certified gold by the Recording Industry Association of Japan (RIAJ), denoting shipments of 100,000 units.

== Background ==
"Ame Datte" was recorded by the Sexy Boyz unit, which consists of members Marius Yo and So Matsushima, in addition to Yūta Jinguuji, Reia Nakamura, Kaoru Kuramoto, Amu Hanyūda, Daigo Nishihata, and Ren Nagase.

== Release and promotion ==
Sexy Zone imitated promotions for "Sexy Summer ni Yuki ga Furu" by performing it on NHK's music program Music Japan on September 30, 2012. The track was used as the theme song for the Fuji TV reality program Real Scope Z. "Kimi no Tame ni Boku ga Iru" was used for volleyball at the 2012 Summer Olympics.

"Sexy Summer ni Yuki ga Furu" was released on October 3 in four editions: Regular Edition; Limited Edition A with bonus DVD content that includes the music video for the title track; Limited Edition B with bonus DVD content that includes behind-the-scenes footage of the music video; and Venue Limited Summary 2012.

== Commercial performance ==
On the issue dated October 15, 2012, "Sexy Summer ni Yuki ga Furu" debuted at number one on Japan's national weekly Oricon Singles Chart, selling 95,154 copies in its first week. It marked Sexy Zone's third consecutive number-one single since its debut, a feat previously achieved by Kis-My-Ft2's "She! Her! Her!". Among teenage male acts, it was last accomplished by Hey! Say! JUMP's "Your Seed"/"Bōken Rider" four years and two months earlier. On the Billboard Japan Hot 100, the song debuted at number 45 and topped the chart the following week.

"Sexy Summer ni Yuki ga Furu" was certified gold at the end of the month by the Recording Industry Association of Japan for shipments exceeding 100,000 units. According to Oricon's year-end report, the single sold 113,280 copies domestically and ranked number 68 on its list of best-selling singles.

== Track listing ==
Regular Edition
No.	Title	Lyrics	Music	Arrangement	Length
1.	"Sexy Summer ni Yuki ga Furu" (Sexy Summerに雪が降る)	Yoshiko Miura	Janne Hyoty, Martin Grano	Suzuki "Daichi" Hideyuki	4:28
2.	"Kimi no Tame ni Boku ga Iru" (キミのため ボクがいる)	Shori Sato	Anders Dannvik, Takuya Harada, Daichi	Tomoki Ishidzuka	4:53
3.	"Ame Datte" (雨だって) (by Sexy Boyz)	Naruya Ihashi	Fredrik Samsson, Naruya Ihashi	Magokoro Ikuta	4:07
4.	"Bayside Elegy" (ベイサイドエレジー)	Zopp	Anders Wigelius, Erik Wigelius	Hiroyuki Nakanishi, Taishō Satō	5:01
5.	"Sexy Summer ni Yuki ga Furu" (Sexy Summerに雪が降る) (Inst.)		Janne Hyoty, Martin Grano	Suzuki "Daichi" Hideyuki	4:28
6.	"Kimi no Tame ni Boku ga Iru" (キミのため ボクがいる) (Inst.)		Anders Dannvik, Takuya Harada, Daichi	Tomoki Ishidzuka	4:53
7.	"Ame Datte" (雨だって) (Inst.)		Fredrik Samsson, Naruya Ihashi	Magokoro Ikuta	4:07
8.	"Bayside Elegy" (ベイサイドエレジー) (Inst.)		Anders Wigelius, Erik Wigelius	Hiroyuki Nakanishi, Taishō Satō	4:58
Total length:					36:55

Limited Edition A and B
No.	Title	Lyrics	Music	Arrangement	Length
1.	"Sexy Summer ni Yuki ga Furu" (Sexy Summerに雪が降る)	Yoshiko Miura	Janne Hyoty, Martin Grano	Suzuki "Daichi" Hideyuki	4:28
2.	"Kimi no Tame ni Boku ga Iru" (キミのため ボクがいる)	Katsutoshi Satō	Anders Dannvik, Takuya Harada, Daichi	Tomoki Ishidzuka	4:53
3.	"Ame Datte" (雨だって) (by Sexy Boyz)	Naruya Ihashi	Fredrik Samsson, Naruya Ihashi	Magokoro Ikuta	4:07
Total length:					13:28

Venue Limited Summary 2012
No.	Title	Lyrics	Music	Arrangement	Length
1.	"Sexy Summer ni Yuki ga Furu" (Sexy Summerに雪が降る)	Yoshiko Miura	Janne Hyoty, Martin Grano	Suzuki "Daichi" Hideyuki	4:28
2.	"Kimi no Tame ni Boku ga Iru" (キミのため ボクがいる)	Katsutoshi Satō	Anders Dannvik, Takuya Harada, Daichi	Tomoki Ishidzuka	4:53
3.	"Ame Datte" (雨だって) (by Sexy Boyz)	Naruya Ihashi	Fredrik Samsson, Naruya Ihashi	Magokoro Ikuta	4:07
4.	"Bayside Elegy" (ベイサイドエレジー)	Zopp	Anders Wigelius, Erik Wigelius	Hiroyuki Nakanishi, Taishō Satō	5:01
Total length:					18:29

Limited Edition A
No.	Title	Length
1.	"Sexy Summer ni Yuki ga Furu" (Sexy Summerに雪が降る) (music clip)

Limited Edition B
No.	Title	Length
1.	"Sexy Summer ni Yuki ga Furu" (Sexy Summerに雪が降る) (making)

== Charts ==
=== Weekly ===
Chart (2012)	Peak position
Billboard Japan Hot 100	1
Oricon Singles Chart	1

=== Year-end ===
Chart (2012)	Peak position
Oricon Singles Chart	68
