= Haruchika =

Japanese novel series

- Cover of Taishutsu Game, the first novel in the Haruchika series

ハルチカ
- Genre: Mystery
- Novel series
- Written by: Sei Hatsuno
- Published by: Kadokawa Shoten
- Imprint: Kadokawa Bunko
- Original run: October 29, 2008 – present
- Volumes: 5
- Manga
- Written by: Sei Hatsuno
- Illustrated by: Būta
- Published by: Kadokawa Shoten
- Magazine: Monthly Shōnen Ace
- Original run: October 26, 2015 – present
- Volumes: 3
- Anime television series

Haruchika: Haruta & Chika
- Directed by: Masakazu Hashimoto
- Produced by: Jun'ichirō Tamura; Kenji Horikawa; Yukiko Katō
- Written by: Reiko Yoshida
- Music by: Shirō Hamaguchi
- Studio: P.A. Works
- Licensed by: AUS: Madman Entertainment; BI/NA: Funimation
- Original network: Tokyo MX, Sun TV, SBS, KNB, TV Saitama, CTC, tvk, GBS, BS11, MTV, TVQ
- English network: SEA: Aniplus Asia
- Original run: January 7, 2016 – March 24, 2016
- Episodes: 12
- Live-action film
- Haruta & Chika (2017)
- icon

Haruchika (ハルチカ), also called Haruta & Chika, is a Japanese mystery novel series by Sei Hatsuno. Kadokawa Shoten has published five novels since October 2008. A manga adaptation published by Kadokawa Shoten in Monthly Shōnen Ace began serialization in December 2015. An anime television series adaptation titled Haruchika: Haruta & Chika by P.A. Works premiered on January 7, 2016. A live-action film adaptation of the same name was released on March 4, 2017.

== Plot ==
Haruta and Chika are members of their high school wind instrument club that is on the verge of being shut down because there are only four members. The two are childhood friends that got split up but reunited nine years later, and they spend their days studying and also trying to recruit new members. When a mysterious event occurs within their school, they band together in order to solve the mystery.

== Characters ==
=== The Brass Club ===
Chika Homura (穂村 千夏, Homura Chika)
Voiced by: Sarah Emi Bridcutt
Played by: Kanna Hashimoto
Chika is a first-year high school student. She was a tomboy who wants to change her image to be a girly girl by joining the Brass Club. She plays the flute.
Haruta Kamijō (上条 春太, Kamijō Haruta)
Voiced by: Sōma Saitō
Played by: Shori Sato
Haruta is a first-year high school student. He is Chika's childhood friend, but is often attacked by her as a running gag. He lives alone in a small apartment to escape the exploitation of his three elder sisters. Haruta gains a huge popularity, both in and outside the school campus due to his capability of solving mysteries. He plays the French horn.
Shinjirō Kusakabe (草壁 信二郎, Kusakabe Shinjirō)
Voiced by: Natsuki Hanae
Played by: Keisuke Koide
The school's music teacher and club supervisor. He was once a famous conductor, but suddenly retired and became a music teacher instead. He is the center of Chika and Haruta's attention. Like Haruta, Kusakabe is also a capable detective and always solves the problem first before Haruta, but allows Haruta and Chika to discover things for themselves.
Keisuke Katagiri (片桐 圭介, Katagiri Keisuke)
Voiced by: Seiichirō Yamashita
Played by: Koki Maeda
The Brass Club's president. He plays the trumpet.
Miyoko Narushima (成島 美代子, Narushima Miyoko)
Voiced by: Haruka Chisuga
A second year student. She plays the oboe. She stopped playing for a year following the death of her younger brother, until Haruta completed a supposedly unsolvable Rubik's Cube for her and told her that she needs to put the past behind her and keep on living.
Maren Sei (マレン・セイ)
Voiced by: Nobunaga Shimazaki
A first year student. He plays the alto saxophone. He is a Chinese-American and was born in China, but due to the country's one-child policy, his parents put him up for adoption with the intent of giving him a better life elsewhere. He was briefly a member of the drama club, but he joined the brass band club after being defeated by Haruta in an acting challenge.
Akari Gotō (後藤 朱里, Gotō Akari)
Voiced by: Yuki Yamada
She is a lively girl who leads the first-year members. She plays the bass trombone. She first met the brass club in order to solve a mystery involving her grandfather. She later joins upon entering high school, when Haruta, Chika, and the rest of the first-years became second-years.
Kaiyū Hiyama (檜山 界雄, Hiyama Kaiyū)
Voiced by: Nobuhiko Okamoto
Played by: Hiroya Shimizu
Naoko's childhood friend who plays percussion. He had withdrawn from school for a year during which he was a radio announcer on the indie radio program "Frequency 77.4 MHz," where he and a group of senior citizens give out advice to listeners.
Naoko Serizawa (芹澤 直子, Serizawa Naoko)
Voiced by: Asami Seto
Played by: Yuri Tsunematsu
A first-year student. She is a clarinet player who dreamed of playing professionally until she started losing her hearing. She has completely lost the hearing in her left ear and is partially deaf in her right ear as well. She was the only main character who didn't actually join the brass club, only being a supporter of the group and one of Chika's music mentors. However, she eventually joins after watching them at competition.

=== Anime-Exclusive Characters ===
Kae Asahina (朝比奈 香恵, Asahina Kae)
Voiced by: Chiaki Omigawa
A second-year high school student and Sae's older twin sister. She plays the clarinet.
Sae Asahina (朝比奈 紗恵, Asahina Sae)
Voiced by: Emi Miyajima
A second-year high school student and Kae's younger twin sister. She plays the bass tuba.

== Media ==
=== Print ===
The Haruchika series of mystery novels are written by Sei Hatsuno. The first novel in the series was published by Kadokawa Shoten on October 29, 2008, in a tankōbon format; five volumes have been published in this format as of September 30, 2015. Kadokawa Shoten has also released the series in bunkobon format starting on July 24, 2010, featuring cover illustrations by Yoko Tanji for the first three volumes, and Hiko Yamanaka for the subsequent volumes. The Taiwan print version features illustrations by Rum.

A manga adaptation illustrated by Būta, with character designs by Namaniku ATK, began serialization in Kadokawa Shoten's Monthly Shōnen Ace with the December 2015 issue, published on October 26. The first tankōbon was released on December 26, 2015.

==== Novel list ====
No.	Title	Japanese release date	Japanese ISBN
1	Exit Game; Taishutsu Gēmu (退出ゲーム)	October 29, 2008	978-4-04-873898-9
2	First Love Sommelier; Hatsukoi Somurie (初恋ソムリエ)	October 1, 2009	978-4-04-873998-6
3	Fantasy Organ; Kūsō Orugan (空想オルガン)	August 31, 2010	978-4-04-874097-5
4	Thousand-year Juliet; Sennen Jurietto (千年ジュリエット)	March 26, 2012	978-4-04-874227-6
5	Planet Charon; Wakusei Karon (惑星カロン)	September 30, 2015	978-4-04-110476-7

=== Anime ===
An anime television series adaptation titled Haruchika: Haruta & Chika (ハルチカ 〜ハルタとチカは青春する〜, Haruchika: Haruta to Chika wa Seishun Suru; lit. Haruta and Chika Enjoy Their Youth), produced by P.A. Works and directed by Masakazu Hashimoto, premiered on January 7, 2016, on Tokyo MX. Namaniku ATK provided the character designs. The opening theme song is "Niji o Ametara" (虹を編めたら; "If We Could Weave Rainbows") by Fhána, and the ending theme is "Kūsō Triangle" (空想トライアングル; "Imaginary Triangle") by ChouCho. The series is licensed by Funimation in North America and the British Isles, and is simulcast on their website. Madman Entertainment licensed the series in Australia and New Zealand, and the series is simulcasting on AnimeLab. Anime Limited is releasing the series for Funimation in the United Kingdom and Ireland.

==== Episode list ====
No.	Official English title Original Japanese title	Original release date
1	"Melodious Cipher"; Transliteration: "Merodiasu na Angō" (Japanese: メロディアスな暗号)	January 7, 2016
High school girl Chika Homura is anything but demure and ladylike with her rough, wild ways coupled with her volleyball abilities, until she is inspired on television to take up an instrument. Choosing the flute due to believing it to make her more maiden-like, she joins the Brass Band Club of Shimizu South High School and reunites with her childhood friend Haruta Kamijo who plays the French horn. She is also introduced to the club's teacher-in-charge Mr. Shinjiro Kusakabe, the club president Keisuke Katagiri and identical twins Kae and Sae Asahina, who make up the entire Brass Band Club, much to Chika's shock. The entire club, including Mr. Kusakabe, soon find a musical tune painted in red on the blackboard of the music room, a note for Mr. Kusakabe claiming that he should know that tune, and a wreath of white clovers that, in the language of flowers, mean "revenge". Mr. Kusakabe does not recognise the tune though, and the club split up to their respective homerooms for the time being as classes start. When they return, Haruta deduces that the tune is a cipher, a coded message that only the person concerned can decipher, and identifying it from Bach's unfinished musical piece 'The Art of Fugue' written during his twilight years. Haruto manages to decode the message by lining the up the notes and the numbers on the board, deriving letters from a computer keyboard. Do-2 is "A", and so on. The message says "I love you. Thank you." as a love letter addressed to Mr. Kusakabe from a graduated student. Mystery solved, Haruta and Chika walk home together, with Chika vowing to play the flute properly so she can beat Haruta.
2	"Cloth Cube"; Transliteration: "Kurosu Kyūbu" (Japanese: クロスキューブ)	January 14, 2016
Haruta and Chika try to encourage others to join the Brass Band Club, especially first-year student Miyoko Narushima, a talented oboist who went to the prestigious Fumon Hall to perform before and won a silver prize despite having only 23 members. As Miyoko blatantly refuses to confide in either one of them, Haruta interrogates her friend Mayu Nishikawa and finds out that on the day of the tournament, Miyoko never showed up for the award ceremony as she was informed of her younger brother's death just after the performance, causing her to quit playing the oboe. Mayu then shows Haruta and Chika to Miyoko's house, where Haruta recognises plenty of puzzle games and deduces that she used to play those with her deceased brother due to how those books and games looked untouched. Although Miyoko rejects their offer of friendship, she gives them a Rubik's Cube to solve, saying that that was the last puzzle her brother left that she could never solve because all its faces were white and devoid of colour. The deadline being Friday after school, the duo set to work. They soon find out that Miyoko's brother had painted an ordinary Rubik's cube over with white oil paint, and after some prompting from Mr. Kusakabe about how this puzzle probably emphasises on its process of completion than the finished product, Haruta realises that this puzzle is not one of punishment like Miyoko believed, but rather one made of love. No matter how one turns the cube, it will never change from its initial scrambled state, so that means to change it from its former self, was Miyoko's brother's message to her to move on from his death and that he loves her. Painting the cube's sides with oil paints, he wanted her to paint her world with colour. Haruta peels off linen from the cube's outer covering and reveals a message congratulating her on solving the puzzle. As thanks, Miyoko joins the Brass Band Club.
3	"Exit Game"; Transliteration: "Taishutsu Gēmu" (Japanese: 退出ゲーム)	January 21, 2016
The Brass Band and Drama clubs use an improvisational acting showdown to help an adopted saxophonist resolve feelings of rejection from his birth parents.
4	"Vernacular Modernism"; Transliteration: "Vanakyurā Modanizumu" (Japanese: ヴァナキュラー・モダニズム)	January 28, 2016
Haruta needs a new place to live and the only available apartment seems to be in a haunted building inherited from a practical joker.
5	"Elephant's Breath"; Transliteration: "Erefantsu Buresu" (Japanese: エレファンツ・ブレス)	February 4, 2016
A trombonist asks Haruta to solve the mystery of why her recently returned grandfather abandoned her grandmother decades ago.
6	"Springraphy"; Transliteration: "Supuringurafi" (Japanese: スプリングラフィ)	February 11, 2016
Haruta and Chika investigate an intruder in the music room, and why she has recently become withdrawn and had falling grades.
7	"The Frequency is 77.4 MHz"; Transliteration: "Shūhasū wa 77.4MHz" (Japanese: 周波数は77.4MHz)	February 18, 2016
To increase their club budget for the new year, Haruta and Chika search for the president of the geology research club and find two colonies of shut-ins.
8	"First Love Sommelier"; Transliteration: "Hatsukoi Somurie" (Japanese: 初恋ソムリエ)	February 25, 2016
Serizawa asks for help saving her aunt who is investigating her first love.
9	"The Gaze of Asmodeus"; Transliteration: "Asumodeusu no Shisen" (Japanese: アスモデウスの視線)	March 3, 2016
Haruta and Chika visit a neighbouring school to discover why its music teacher accepted a voluntary suspension.
10	"The Jabberwock's License"; Transliteration: "Jabauokku no Kansatsu" (Japanese: ジャバウォックの鑑札)	March 10, 2016
On the day of the district competition, Haruta finds a valuable dog and must quickly determine which of two claimants is its true owner.
11	"Valley of Eden"; Transliteration: "Eden no Tani" (Japanese: エデンの谷)	March 17, 2016
Haruta and Chika help an eccentric friend of their teacher to discover what happened to the key for a rare antique piano.
12	"Sympathy Triangle"; Transliteration: "Kyōmei Toraianguru" (Japanese: 共鳴トライアングル)	March 24, 2016
Haruta deduces that their teacher has been offered a job with a symphony and follows him with Chika, learning more about why he left professional music.

=== Film ===
A live-action film adaptation of the same name starring Shori Sato of the idol group Sexy Zone and Kanna Hashimoto premiered on March 4, 2017.
