= Timelesz Project =

Japanese television talent show

- Also known as: timelesz project -AUDITION- タイムレスプロジェクトオーディション
- Genre: Reality television
- Directed by: Yoshitaka Ito
- Country of origin: Japan
- Original language: Japanese
- No. of episodes: 18

Production
- Production locations: Tokyo and Osaka
- Running time: 37- 41 minutes
- Production company: Starto Entertainment

Original release
- Network: Netflix
- Release: September 13, 2024

timelesz project (Japanese: タイムレスプロジェクトオーディション; stylized as timelesz project -AUDITION-) is a talent competition reality show, created by entertainment company Starto Entertainment, to add new members to the boy group timelesz (formerly known as Sexy Zone). The project involves the three current members of the group, Fuma Kikuchi, So Matsushima, and Shori Sato as they audition and select contestants from Japan and the United States.

== Background ==
After the departure of Marius Yo in 2022 and Kento Nakajima in 2024 from Sexy Zone, the remaining members (renamed timelesz) decided to hold open auditions based on Kikuchi's suggestion. The selection of new group members through an audition process was later confirmed to be in a reality competition show format internationally distributed by Netflix.

== Overview ==
A total of 18,922 applications were submitted to join timelesz and of those, 350 were selected for the second round of auditions held in Tokyo and Osaka, where the successful applicants were required to sing and dance songs selected from a list of approved songs originally performed by Starto Entertainment artists. Thirty-six contestants moved on to the third round where they were placed into groups, having to learn a song and choreography within three days. The fourth round narrows the number of remaining contestants to fifteen, plus the inclusion of Starto Entertainment actors Takuto Teranishi, Yoshitaka Hara and Daichi Imae. Round five had 12 candidates. Round six cut the number to eight. The final number of new members, and who they are, were determined by the three original members of the group in consultation with the program's dancing and vocal trainers, NOSUKE and Miki Miyamoto in the last episode.

The last episode aired on February 15, with a surprise appearance by Arashi's Sho Sakurai as moderator. Sakurai mentioned the passion of the members and the participating candidates. He talked about timelesz, about the memories he has with them, and how much they have grown. And about the project: "Today, the three of them will make a big decision. It's nerve-wracking. I'm nervous too. I think it will be a really big day. I hope you will watch over them with kind eyes until the end". Noting the end of the "candidacy era", Sakurai touched on the fact that there might be frustration, not only within this moment, but also in the future. He told them that they have to start thinking as a group, that even the smallest frustrations, affect it. That the opponent they will be fighting in the end, is not inside, but outside. He advised them to avoid actions that put others down to make themselves look good. "If anything happens, there are many seniors, including me, so I hope you will come to us for advice, even if it's something small. I think that's our strongest point, because we're a family". Finally, Sakurai shared his own experience. "I was a junior for four years. When I debuted, some of my friends ended up drifting apart. So it might be difficult to get back together right away after this, but you can stay friends forever. I want you to cherish each other".

After singing the last pair of songs ("Run" and timelesz' new single, "Rock this Party"), the winners of the project to be the new members were revealed: Shuto Inomata, Taiki Shinozuka, Masaki Hashimoto, Takuto Teranishi and Yoshitaka Hara. The new members were introduced to the press 5 minutes after the end of the program. In the press conference, Kikuchi proposed a toast, giving each of the new members a colored drink, which ended being the color each one was to adopt: Shinozuka, white, for him to "look for your own color"; Teranishi, light blue, "support the people around while being calm, trustworthy, and mature"; Hashimoto, pink, "cute, yet strong and passionate"; Inomata, yellow, "kind, loving and positive mind" (Hara added that Inomata is like the sun "I hope that the sense of closeness will permeate the fans", while Kikuchi joked on the choice of color, not knowing if he should have chosen "Yamabuki color"). As Sato started the toast, Hara blurted out that his drink was bitter, and Matsushima smiled saying "lets go on with this". Hara asked Kikuchi if he had prepared a normal, "refreshing drink", and he answered "Sorry, it was a mistake". Hara's color is yellow-green.

The new group formation released "Rock this party" as a digital single, on February 28, 2025.

During timelesz' 8-person formation's first concert tour, "We're timelesz LIVE TOUR 2025 episode 1 ~FAM~", in the Yokohama Arena performance on August 6, 2025, it was announced that the series would be released on BluRay and DVD on December 17, including unreleased footage and member commentaries.

=== timelesz Project ~REAL~ ===
In the August 6, 2025 "FAM" Yokohama concert, it was also announced that a new documentary, "timelesz Project ~REAL~", would be distributed worldwide on Netflix in 2026.

== List of contestants ==
timelesz project -AUDITION- contestants
Name	Age	Region	Profession	Results
Tomoki Nishiyama	24	Tokyo	Dance Instructor	Round 5 Elimination
Noa Asai	17	United States	High School Student	Semi-final (Round 6) Elimination
Kaede Kitabayashi	24	Okinawa	Restaurant Worker	Round 4 Elimination
Yuga Sano	22	Tokyo	Dance Instructor	Round 3 Elimination
Ota Kagaya	20	Hokkaido	University Student	Round 3 Elimination
Wataru Yamane	22	Yamaguchi	Italian Restaurant Employee	Round 5 Elimination
Daisuke Maeda	23	Toyama	Karaoke Bar Employee	Round 5 Elimination
Yoshiaki Takahashi	25	Tokyo	Gym Manager	Round 3 Elimination
Hiromu Honda	23	Kanagawa	Part-Timer	Semi-final (Round 6) Elimination
Sota Sukegawa	18	Kanagawa	University Student	Round 3 Elimination
Takumi Maie	27	Ibaraki	Construction Equipment	Round 3 Elimination
Masaki Hashimoto	24	Kanagawa	Yakiniku Restaurant Worker	Advanced to Final
Sota Saito	26	Gunma	Beauty Salon Owner/ Former Johnny's Jr.	Round 3 Elimination
Yu Okami	24	Aichi	Firefighter	Round 3 Elimination
Taiga Matsuda	20	Aichi	Cafe Employee	Round 3 Elimination
Roi Hamagawa	18	Okinawa	High School Student	Semi-final (Round 6) Elimination
Rai Tsutsumi	21	Fukuoka	University Student	Round 3 Elimination
Taisho Maeda	28	Kanagawa	Former Idol	Round 4 Elimination
Riku Nagai	27	Yamanashi	Dancer	Round 3 Elimination
Ikuto Kamiya	20	Aichi	Influencer	Round 3 Elimination
Shunto Ikeda	19	Saitama	Part Timer	Round 3 Elimination
Kota Shikano	20	Kagoshima	University Student	Round 3 Elimination
Hiroki Takayama	22	Okinawa	Part Timer	Round 3 Elimination
Ryota Ueno	28	Kyoto	Dance Instructor	Round 4 Elimination
Atsuki Ide	22	Okayama	Sales	Round 3 Elimination
Shuto Inomata	22	Ibaraki	Painter	Advanced to Final
Kenta Hino	29	Ehime	Singer	Round 4 Elimination
Kazuki Numata	26	Saga	Rapper	Round 3 Elimination
Yutaro Yazaki	29	Kanagawa	TV Announcer	Round 3 Elimination
Taiki Shinozuka	21	Osaka	University Student	Advanced to Final
Ryosuke Abe	26	Fukuoka	Pizza Delivery Worker	Round 3 Elimination
Ryo Suzuki	25	Tokyo	Phone Case Salesman	Round 5 Elimination
Kazuki Matsuda	20	Kanagawa	Vocational School Student	Round 3 Elimination
Ayuto Kawamura	21	Mie	University Student	Round 3 Elimination
Kuha Sano	19	Shizuoka	Dance Instructor	Round 3 Elimination
Ryoto Iwasaki	23	Aichi	Yakiniku Restaurant Worker	Round 4 Elimination
Takuto Teranishi	30	Kanagawa	Actor (Starto Entertainment)	Advanced to Final
Yoshitaka Hara	29	Kanagawa	Actor (Starto Entertainment)	Advanced to Final
Daichi Imae	29	Kyoto	Actor (Starto Entertainment)	Round 4 Elimination

=== Where are they now? ===
Noa Asai joined Starto Entertainment in 2025 and is part of the trainees. His entrance to the agency was announced during the performance of "Junior Showcase 2025 ~Shinsei~", produced by Super Eight's Tadayoshi Okura, in which he appeared.

Tomoki Nishiyama and Daisuke Maeda, went on to join Horipro. When Nishiyama joined the audition process for Timelesz Project, he already had the desire to be in a group. When Horipro contacted him after the auditions ended, he asked Maeda to follow. Inside Horipro, they started to organize a group, with the support of the higher-ups. They are now part of TAGRIGHT. The 7-member group released their pre-debut single, "Forever Blue", on January 7, 2026. When interviewed for Gianna Magazine, Nishiyama said that his dream is to one day stand on a stage together with timelesz. Maeda commented that he would like everyone involved in the auditions to see how much they have grown.

== Episodes ==
No.	Title	Original release date
1	"Episode 1"; Transliteration: "episode 01 Nakama Sahashi Ōdishon, timelesz project Shidō!" (Japanese: episode 01 仲間探しオーディション、timelesz project 始動)	September 13, 2024
In the search for new groupmates, Fuma Kikuchi, Sou Matsushima, and Shori Sato of timelesz meet, interview, and watch the live auditions of the first half of the 350 applicants who have passed the initial screening process in Tokyo. Additionally, the trio provide insight into why they have decided to add new members nearly fifteen years post-debut.
2	"Episode 2"; Transliteration: "episode 02 Deai no Sono Sakihe... Iyoiyo 3-ji Shinsha Tsūka-sha ga Kimaru!" (Japanese: episode 02 出会いのその先へ…いよいよ3次審査 通過者が決まる!)	September 24, 2024
Kikuchi, Matsushima, and Sato, meet, interview, and watch the live auditions of the second half of the applicants who have passed the initial screening process in Osaka. The 350 individuals who were selected for round two are narrowed down to thirty-six people that will compete in round three.
3	"Episode 3"; Transliteration: "special episode -Kakugo-" (Japanese: special episode -覚悟-)	October 11, 2024
Kikuchi meets with Shota Watanabe of Snow Man and discusses Watanabe's similar experience with adding three new members to the group shortly prior to the group's debut after the group's lineup had remained unchanged for seven years. Kikuchi also reads a letter from Ren Meguro, one of the three added members, about his perspective and experience as someone joining a pre-existing band.
4	"Episode 4"; Transliteration: "episode 03 3-ji Shinsha Kaishi! Kōho Nama 36-mei ga Chīmu Pafōmansu ni Idomu!" (Japanese: episode 03 3次審査開始! 候補生36名がチームパフォーマンスに挑む!)	October 25, 2024
The thirty-six remaining participants are tasked with learning the choreography to "Can Do! Can Go!" by V6 in thirty minutes. The participants are ranked based on how well they perform the dance, with Wataru Yamane in first place. The third round consists of the participants being split into four groups of nine where they have three days to learn their assigned song. Kikuchi reveals that the number of participants that will advance to the fourth round will be fifteen based on their performance of either "SHAKE" by SMAP or "Monster" by Arashi. Blue Group is assigned "SHAKE" by SMAP but suffers from a power struggle between the assigned leader of the group, Rai Tsutsumi, and two other members which impacts the decision making and performance quality of the group. Tadayoshi Okura makes a guest appearance as a special trainer and expresses doubt that the participants are ready for careers as idols. Matsushima and Kikuchi advise Blue Group on how to better communicate and support one another. In their group performance, they were able to overcome their initial issues and receive positive reviews from timelesz.
5	"Episode 5"; Transliteration: "episode 04 3-ji Shinsa team GREEN Mitchaku-hen" (Japanese: episode 04 3次審査 team GREEN密着篇)	November 8, 2024
Green Group is tasked with "Monster" by Arashi. timelesz finds the group's members promising but the group suffers from a lack of communication and group leader Daisuke Maida being unable to learn the choreography and lead simultaneously. Sato also notices that the group is too focused on themselves and some members seem to not be fully invested. They implement some of Sato's suggestions but the group still seems unconfident during their midpoint performance check. They continue to work on their critiques and receive positive feedback from timelesz in their evaluated performance.
6	"Episode 6"; Transliteration: "episode 05 3-ji Shinsha team YELLOW Mitchaku-hen" (Japanese: episode 05 3次審査 team YELLOW密着篇)	November 22, 2024
7	"Episode 7"; Transliteration: "episode 06 3-ji Shinsha team RED Mitchaku hen 8 3-ji Shinsha Tsūka-sha Kettei!" (Japanese: episode 06 3次審査 team RED密着篇&3次審査通過者決定!)	November 28, 2024
8	"Episode 8"; Transliteration: "episode 07 4-ji Shinsha Tsui ni Shidō! Kōho-sei o Machiukeru no wa -!?" (Japanese: episode 07 4次審査ついに始動! 候補生を待ち受けるのは－!?)	December 7, 2024
9	"Episode 9"; Transliteration: "episode 08 4-ji Shinsha team 『Jinsei Yūgi』" (Japanese: episode 08 4次審査 team 『人生遊戯』)	December 14, 2024
10	"Episode 10"; Transliteration: "episode 09 4-ji Shinsha team『RIGHT NEXT TO YOU』" (Japanese: episode 09 4次審査 team 『RIGHT NEXT TO YOU』)	December 21, 2024
11	"Episode 11"; Transliteration: "episode 10 4-ji Shinsha Tsūka-sha Happyō 18-mei kara 12-mei ni" (Japanese: episode 10 4次審査 通過者発表 18名から12名に)	December 27, 2024
12	"Episode 12"; Transliteration: "special episode 02 -Sugao-" (Japanese: special episode 02 -素顔-)	January 3, 2025
13	"Episode 13"; Transliteration: "episode 11 5-ji Menbā Purodūsu Shinsha Sutāto!" (Japanese: episode 11 5次 メンバープロデュース審査スタート!)	January 10, 2025
14	"Episode 14"; Transliteration: "episode 12 5-ji Shinsha team SATO-hen" (Japanese: episode 12 5次審査 team SATO篇)	January 17, 2025
15	"Episode 15"; Transliteration: "episode 13 5-ji Shinsha team MATSUSHIMA-hen" (Japanese: episode 13 5次審査 team MATSUSHIMA篇)	January 24, 2025
16	"Episode 16"; Transliteration: "episode 14 5-ji Shinsha team KIKUCHI-hen" (Japanese: episode 14 5次審査 team KIKUCHI篇)	January 31, 2025
17	"Episode 17"; Transliteration: "6-ji (Fainaru) Shinsha Shidō!" (Japanese: episode 15 6次（ファイナル）審査始動!)	February 7, 2025
18	"Episode 18"; Transliteration: "episode 16 Saishū Shinsha & Shin Menbā Kettei!" (Japanese: episode 16 最終審査&新メンバー決定!)	February 15, 2025

== Legal action over slander against the candidates ==
On February 4, 2025, on the project's SNS, a post calling attention to slander: "We will take strict measures, including legal action". This was after confirmed content and information that can be taken as slander was found on SNS, in particular, following the results of the fifth round of screening. "This situation cannot be overlooked". Starto Entertainment, which operates the timelesz project, will take strict action.
