= So Matsushima =

Japanese singer and actor (born 1997)

So Matsushima 松島聡
- Born: November 27, 1997 (age 28); Shizuoka, Japan
- Genres: J-pop
- Years active: 2011–present
- Member of: timelesz

So Matsushima (松島聡, Matsushima Sou, born November 27, 1997) is a Japanese idol, singer, actor, artist, and member of the group timelesz (formerly known as Sexy Zone). He is from the city of Shimada in Shizuoka prefecture.

== Career ==
Matsushima entered Johnny & Associates in February 2011, at the age of 13, after being inspired to join the entertainment world by idol group Hey! Say! JUMP, also belonging to Johnny's.

He was selected to join the group Sexy Zone, and on September 29, 2011, their CD debut was announced to take place in November of that year.

In May 2014, Matsushima was placed into a sub-unit named "Sexy Matsu", together with Juniors Kaito Matsukura and Genta Matsuda. The name was chosen due to the shared occurrence of the character 松 (Matsu) in the trio's family names. In March, 2025, Sexy Matsu reunited after 10 years for the program "Ano koro kara watashitachi wa".

When Kento Nakajima left on March 31, 2024, Sexy Zone ceased activities. On April 1, the next day, Matsushima, Fuma Kikuchi and Shori Sato continued under the name "timelesz", which officially started as a group of eight in 2025, after including the five members selected through auditions in the so–called "timelesz project".

=== Theater ===
In February 2022, it was announced that he would star in the play "Kodomo no Issei" in April of the same year, replacing Hey! Say! JUMP's Hikaru Yaotome who withdrew due to sudden hearing loss.

=== Television ===
In 2022, he appeared on Nippon Television's The! Tetsuwan! DASH!!, becoming a weekly cast member in 2024.

=== Radio ===
He occasionally presents the radio show timelesz no Qrzone (previously Sexy Zone no Qrzone).

=== Tourism promoter ===
As a Shizuoka native, in the autumn of 2022 Matsushima became a travel ambassador for the prefecture in a campaign to encourage tourism.

=== Art ===
Due to his artistic skill, Matsushima was in charge of designing the charity T-shirt for 24 Hour Television and also designed Sexy Zone's mascot, the Sekubear (a portmanteau of Sexy Bear). He also designed sneakers for Takahisa Masuda of the group NEWS, for their tour NEWS LIVE 2022 ONGAKU (音楽).

In 2023, he prepared an art exhibition titled Ko-ten at Omotesando Hills Space O from September 27 until October 15. The works consisted of installation pieces, many using mannequins to represent his experiences and feelings. In May 2024 he released a book containing images of the artworks.

=== Clothing design ===
In October 2023, he has collaborated twice with the brand Peach John to produce a collection of unisex loungewear featuring motifs related to his dog, Bisu.

=== SNS ===
He opened an official Instagram account on January 9, 2024 and maintains a paid blog titled SO GOOD DAY via the agency's Family Club Web.

== Personal life ==
He is known affectionately by fans and colleagues as So-chan.

He is a fan of the Harry Potter series, and once queued for 6 hours to get an autograph from Tom Felton, who played Draco Malfoy in the films series. In 2025, he appeared alongside Felton at the opening event for the Harry Potter Shop in Harajuku in Tokyo, the first flagship Harry Potter Shop in Japan.

=== Health ===
On November 28, 2018, he announced that he would take a hiatus from activities to recover from idiopathic panic disorder. On August 12, 2020, he announced that he would return.

=== Family ===
He has made reference to being raised for at least some portion of his life in a single father household, with an older sister 8 years his senior.

In 2019, during his hiatus, he acquired a pet French Bulldog known as "Bisu", short for "Biscuit" (Bisuketto).

== Filmography ==
=== Television ===
==== Dramas ====
Year	Title	Role	Role type	Notes	Ref(s)
2017	Yonimo Kimyouna Monogatari	Kanta	Lead	Autumn Special. Drama debut	
2017	Wagahai no Heya De Aru	Textbook	Guest	Voice	
2018	Zero - Episode Zero	Keisuke	Support		
2021	Kotaro wa Hitorigurashi	Tasuku Iwanaga	Guest	Eps. 8–10	
2021	Waiting at the Big Bathroom	Wall poster model	Uncredited	Ep. 5	
2022	Kioku Sosa: Shinjuku Higashisho Jiken File	Takumi Yojo	Support role	Special 2; Season 3	
2023	Kaettekitazoyo! Kotaro wa Hitorigurashi	Tasuku Iwanaga	Support role	Season 2	
2023	Beni Sasu Life	Kazuma Hojo	Support role		
2025	Papa and Daddy's Home Cooking	Akira Sengoku	Lead		
2026	Sounds of Winter	Ryosuke Tabata	Guest	Ep. 6	
2026	First Cry: Boshi Kyumei Kyukyu Han	Kaito Nagasaka	Support		

==== Programs ====
Year	Title	Role	Notes	Ref(s)
2024	timelesz project -AUDITION-	Himself	Timelesz's new member auditions	
2026	The World's Astonishing News!	Himself	Co-host with Shōfukutei Tsurube II; World news with drama recreations	
