= River (2011 film) =

- Film poster advertising this film in Japan
- Directed by: Ryūichi Hiroki
- Written by: Ryūichi Hiroki, Nami Yoshikawa
- Starring: Misako Renbutsu
- Cinematography: Noriyuki Mizuguchi
- Release dates: November 19, 2011 (Tokyo Filmex); March 10, 2012 (Japan)
- Running time: 89 minutes
- Country: Japan
- Language: Japanese

River is a 2011 Japanese drama film based on the 2008 Akihabara massacre incident. The film is written and directed by Ryūichi Hiroki. The film stars actress Misako Renbutsu, who will play the role of a person who lost her love interest in the attacks.

River debuted at the 12th Tokyo Filmex as one of its special presentations. It will subsequently be released in Japanese cinemas on 10 March 2012.

== Plot ==
Hikari's boyfriend is one of those killed in the Akihabara massacre incident. Suffering from the shock of her loss and unable to accept this reality, she cuts herself off from the outside world. She eventually manages to muster enough courage to visit Akihabara, the scene of the incident. There, she encounters many people who are still coming to terms with the aftermath of the incident and are still suffering from the aftereffects.

== Cast ==
- Misako Renbutsu as Hikari, a woman whose boyfriend was a victim in the attacks.
- Mami Nakamura as a female photographer.
- Anta Odaka
- Toshie Negishi
- Nahami as an employee of a maid café.
- Tomorowo Taguchi as a scout for a maid café.
- Tokio Emoto
- Yukichi Kobayashi
- Yuto Kobayashi

== Production ==
=== Development ===
River was officially revealed on 18 October 2011. The film is the first film to be based on the 2008 Akihabara massacre tragedy. During this incident, one man knocked down pedestrians with a truck and stabbed several people, leaving 7 people dead and 10 more injured. The film will be directed by Ryūichi Hiroki, who had previously directed films like April Bride (2009) and Kimi no Tomodachi (2008). Hiroki, whose hometown was devastated by the 2011 Tōhoku earthquake and tsunami, changed the script of the film to have a stronger focus on the areas affected by this disaster.

The lead character of the film is played by actress Misako Renbutsu. Renbutsu had previously starred in the 2007 film Tenkōsei: Sayonara Anata. In addition, the film also stars Mami Nakamura, Anta Odaka, Toshie Negishi, Nahami, Tomorowo Taguchi, Tokio Emoto, Yukichi Kobayashi and Yuto Kobayashi.

=== Theme song ===
The theme song for the film River is the song Moon River. This song was originally used in the 1961 American film Breakfast at Tiffany's, which starred actress Audrey Hepburn. This song was used because it "reflects the atmosphere of Kanda River".

== Release ==
River will make its debut at the 12th Tokyo Filmex as one of the festival's screening. This festival will open on 19 November 2011. The film will subsequently be released in Japanese cinemas in March 2012.

== See also ==
- Akihabara massacre
