= Kimi ni Hitomebore =

Single by Sexy Zone

from the album Sexy Power3
- B-side: "Trophy"; "Lady Spicy"; "Snow & Stars"
- Released: November 19, 2014
- Label: Pony Canyon
- Composer: Kōji Ide
- Lyricist: Yuho Iwasato

Sexy Zone singles chronology
"Otoko Never Give Up" (2014)	"Kimi ni Hitomebore" (2014)

"Kimi ni Hitomebore" (Japanese: 君にHITOMEBORE; lit. 'Love at First Sight for You') is a song by Japanese boy band Sexy Zone, released as their seventh single on November 19, 2014, through Pony Canyon.

== Background and release ==
"Kimi ni Hitomebore" was written by Kōji Ide with lyrics by Yuho Iwasato, as the theme song for the TV Asahi drama Black Suit Story (Kurofuku Monogatari), in which group member Kento Nakajima starred as the lead role.

The song was available for early digital preview on the Japanese music distribution platform Dwango starting November 5, 2014. The single was issued in five different editions: five limited editions including a DVD, plus the regular CD-only version.

== Critical reception ==
CD Journal gave a positive review on "Kimi ni Hitomebore," commenting: "The song combines a bad-boy vibe, boyish sex appeal, and princely charm all at once, along with an updated sense of kayōkyoku—in other words, that sharp, gorgeous, perfectly polished sound."

== Chart performance ==
"Kimi ni Hitomebore" debuted in number one on the weekly Oricon Singles Chart, selling 336,101 copies. It was the 18th best-selling single of the year in Japan, with 347,737 copies.

== Track listing ==
CD single – standard edition
No.	Title	Lyrics	Music	Arrangement	Length
1.	"Kimi ni Hitomebore" (君にHITOMEBORE)	Yuho Iwasato	Kōji Ide	Masaya Suzuki	4:54
2.	"Trophy"	Jyoya Uenaka	Susumu Kawaguchi; Joakim Björnberg; Christofer Erixon	Ikuta Machine	4:08
3.	"Lady Spicy" (レディ・スパイシー)	Kohei Dojima	Dojima	Chokkaku	4:31
4.	"Snow & Stars"	Iwasato	Samuel Waermo; Fredrik Samsson	Hideyuki "Daichi" Suzuki	4:21
5.	"Kimi ni Hitomebore" (Instrumental)
6.	"Trophy" (Instrumental)
7.	"Lady Spicy" (Instrumental)
8.	"Snow & Stars" (Instrumental)
