= Marius Yo =

Former Japanese singer, songwriter, and actor (born 2000)

- マリウス 葉
- Born: Marius Julius Seiryu Schmich (Note: In a 2017 appearance on the variety talk show Konya Kurabete Mimashita 2-Hour Special, Yo stated his full name as Marius Julius Seiryu Schmich Yo (葉 マリウス ユリウス 成龍 シュミッヒ, Yō Mariusu Yuriusu Seiryū Shumihhi). His Bachelor's Degree lists his legal name as Marius Julius Seiryu Schmich.); March 30, 2000 (age 26); Heidelberg, Baden-Württemberg, Germany
- Years active: 2011–2022
- Musical career
- Genres: J-pop
- Occupations: Singer; actor
- Formerly of: Sexy Zone

Marius Julius Seiryu Schmich (born March 30, 2000), known professionally as Marius Yo (マリウス 葉, Yō Mariusu), is a former Japanese singer, songwriter, actor and television personality. He was a member of the boy band Sexy Zone.

== Early life ==
Marius Julius Seiryu Schmich was born on March 30, 2000, in Heidelberg, Baden-Württemberg, Germany. His father is German and his mother is Eri Yo, a former Takarazuka Revue actress known by the stage name Akira Yo who is a Japanese national of Taiwanese descent. He has two older siblings, Marilena and Max.

Yo is trilingual; he speaks Japanese, English, and German.

== Career ==
Yo joined Johnny & Associates in January 2011 and debuted together with Kento Nakajima, Fuma Kikuchi, Shori Sato, and So Matsushima as the youngest member of idol group Sexy Zone in November 2011. He was the youngest person to ever debut with the Johnnys & Associates (Age 11 when debuted). In 2012, he debuted as an actor in the Japanese drama Kodomo Keisatsu.

On May 5, 2014, during "Sexy Zone Spring Tour Sexy Second Concert" in Yokohama Arena, it was announced that Sexy Zone's spin-off units, Sexy Boyz and Sexy Show, would be established, with Yo and Matsushima as the respective leaders. The two other members of Sexy Boyz were Yuta Jinguji and Genki Iwahashi, while Sexy Show included of Kaito Matsukura and Genta Matsuda. Yo continued to work as a member of both Sexy Zone and Sexy Boyz. In 2015 for their tenth single, Marius became a part of Sexy Zone again, disbanding Sexy Boyz.

On December 2, 2020, it was announced that Marius would go on hiatus due to poor health.

On December 27, 2022, it was announced that Marius would be graduating from Sexy Zone and retiring from the entertainment industry after December 31, 2022.

On December 31, 2022, during Johnny & Associates's annual countdown event "Johnny's Countdown 2022-2023", he performed with Sexy Zone for the final time and retired from the entertainment industry.

== Personal life ==
Since leaving the entertainment industry, Yo attended and graduated from IE University in 2024 with a Bachelor's Degree in philosophy, politics, law, and economics.

== Filmography ==
For Sexy Zone-related appearances, see Sexy Zone.

=== TV dramas ===
- Kodomo Keisatsu (TBS, 2012) Seishiro Hazama
- Kodomo Keishi (TBS, 2013) Seishiro Hazama (voice over by Mamoru Miyano)
- Akumu-chan Special (NTV, 2014) Yume no Oji
- Fuller House (Netflix 2017) As Himself

=== Movies ===
- Kodomo Keisatsu (2013, Toho), Seishiro Hazama
- Akumu-chan the Movie (2014), Yume no Oji/Shibui Kanji

=== TV variety programs ===
- Johnny's Jr. Land (BS SKY, October 2, 2011 – 2012)
- Bakusho Gakuen Nasebanaru! (TBS, October 9, 2012 - February 26, 2013)

=== Concerts ===
- Live House Johnny's Ginza 2013 with So Matsushima and Johnny's Jr (Theater Crea Ginza, May, 2013)
- Gamushara Sexy Summer festival!! (ガムシャラSexy夏祭り!!) (EX Theater Roppongi, July 30 - August 10, 2014)
- A.B.C-Z's "Summer Concert 2014 A.B.C-Z "Legend" (Yoyogi National First Gymnasium, September 14–15, 2014 ), Special Guest
- Live House Johnny's Ginza 2015 with Johnny's Jr (Theater Crea Ginza, May 8–10,17, 2015)
- Gamushara! Summer Station (ガムシャラ！サマーステーション) (EX Theater Roppongi, July 23 - August 19, 2015)
- Johnnys' Summer Paradise 2016 Hey So! Hey Yo! ~summertime memory~ (Tokyo Dome City Hall, August 7–9, 2016)
- Summer Paradise 2017 So what? Yolo! (Tokyo Dome City Hall, August 17–20, 2017)

=== Stage performances ===
- JOHNNYS’ World (Imperial Theater Tokyo, November 10 - December 30, 2012)
- Hello Kitty Adventures in Wonderland (Sanrio Puroland, April 20, 2013) Kyle (voice)
- 2015 Shinshun JOHNNYS' World (Imperial Theater Tokyo, January 1–27, 2015)
- DREAM BOYS (Imperial Theater Tokyo, September 12–14&18-20, 2015)
- Shonentachi Kiki Ippatsu! (Nissay Theater Tokyo, September 4–28, 2016) (Special Appearance)

=== CM ===
- ORANGINA (Suntory, March 2017)

=== Ambassador ===
- Otsuka Museum of Art Holiday at the Museum campaign (November 3, 2018 - May 2, 2019)

== Solo songs ==
Year	Title	Details
2015	Danke Schoen (ダンケ・シェーン)	「DREAM BOYS」(2015), feature in Sexy Zone 11th single "Shori no hi Made" (勝利の日まで) (Regular Edition)
2016	Welcome to the paradise	「Johnnys' Summer Paradise 2016 Hey So! Hey Yo! ~summertime memory~」, feature in Sexy Zone Best Album "Sexy Zone 5th Anniversary Best" (Limited Edition B)
2017	Déjà-vu	「Summer Paradise 2017 So what? Yolo!」, feature in DVD/Blu-ray "Sexy Zone Presents Sexy Tour 2017 ~STAGE" Special CD (First-run limited Edition)
2019	Keep On	「Sexy Zone Live Tour 2019 PAGES」feature in "Sexy Zone 6th Album PAGES" Disc 2 (Regular Edition)
2020	all this time	Sexy Zone 7th Album "Pop x Step!?" Disc 2 (Regular Edition)
