= Nintama Rantarō season 23 =

Japanese anime series season

This is a list of episodes from the twenty-third season of the anime series Nintama Rantarō. The season aired on NHK since March 30, 2015.

The opening theme is "Yūki 100% (2012)" (勇気100%・2012 "Courage 100% 2012") by Sexy Zone. The ending theme is "Matta Nante na Shitsu!" (待ったなんてなしっ!) also by Sexy Zone.

== Episode list ==
No. overall	No. in season	Title	Original release date
1814	1	"First Year Hagumi's New Semester"; Transliteration: "Ichinen Hagumi no Shin Gakki no Dan" (Japanese: 一年は組の新学期の段)	March 30, 2015
1815	2	Transliteration: "Hatago-ya no Kettō no Dan" (Japanese: はたご屋の決闘の段)	March 31, 2015
1816	3	"I'm Not a Ninja!"; Transliteration: "Ninja Janai! no Dan" (Japanese: 忍者じゃない！の段)	April 1, 2015
1817	4	"The Late at Night Class"; Transliteration: "Shinya no Jugyō no Dan" (Japanese: 深夜の授業の段)	April 2, 2015
1818	5	"Save Onigumomaru"; Transliteration: "Onigumomaru o Sukue no Dan" (Japanese: 鬼蜘蛛丸を救えの段)	April 3, 2015
1819	6	Transliteration: "Ayashī Aikotoba no Dan" (Japanese: 怪しい合言葉の段)	April 6, 2015
1820	7	"Denko Yamada's Pride"; Transliteration: "Yamada Denko no Puraido no Dan" (Japanese: 山田伝子のプライドの段)	April 7, 2015
1821	8	"Buddhist Priest-sama is a Ninja?"; Transliteration: "Oshō-sama wa Ninja? no Dan" (Japanese: 和尚様は忍者？の段)	April 8, 2015
1822	9	"The Beautiful Cleaning Duty"; Transliteration: "Utsukushī Sōji Tōban no Dan" (Japanese: 美しい掃除当番の段)	April 9, 2015
1823	10	"It's a Yōkan Case"; Transliteration: "Yōkan Jiken dayo no Dan" (Japanese: ようかん事件だよの段)	April 10, 2015
1824	11	Transliteration: "Maitake-jō no kengaku-kai no Dan" (Japanese: マイタケ城の見学会の段)	April 13, 2015
1825	12	Transliteration: "Kiken na Banbanjī! ? no Dan" (Japanese: 危険なバンバンジー！？の段)	April 14, 2015
1826	13	"The Delicious Shadou-sensei"; Transliteration: "Oishī Shadou-sensei no Dan" (Japanese: おいしい斜堂先生の段)	April 15, 2015
1827	14	"Gourmet Yamabuki"; Transliteration: "Gurume na Yamabuki no Dan" (Japanese: グルメな山ぶ鬼の段)	April 16, 2015
1828	15	Transliteration: "Otakara o Mitsuke Dase no Dan" (Japanese: お宝を見つけ出せの段)	April 17, 2015
1829	16	"A Too Strong Old Lady"; Transliteration: "Tsuyo Sugiru Obāsan no dan" (Japanese: 強すぎるおばあさんの段)	April 20, 2015
1830	17	"Let's Follow Ran, Kiri, and Shin"; Transliteration: "Ran Kiri Shin o Bikō seyo no Dan" (Japanese: 乱きりしんを尾行せよの段)	April 21, 2015
1831	18	"A Lunch? B Lunch?"; Transliteration: "Ē Ranchi? Bī Ranchi? no Dan" (Japanese: Aランチ？Bランチ？の段)	April 22, 2015
1832	19	"The Secret Basement"; Transliteration: "Himitsu no Chikashitsu no Dan" (Japanese: 秘密の地下室の段)	April 23, 2015
1833	20	"Mr. Komatsuda is a Genius!"; Transliteration: "Komatsuda-san wa Tensai! no Dan" (Japanese: 小松田さんは天才！の段)	April 24, 2015
