= Lady Diamond (Sexy Zone song) =

- Regular Edition cover

Single by Sexy Zone

from the album One Sexy Zone
- Language: Japanese
- Released: April 11, 2012
- Length: 4:54
- Label: Pony Canyon
- Composer: Kōji Makaino
- Lyricist: Gorō Matsui

Sexy Zone singles chronology
"Sexy Zone" (2011)	"Lady Diamond" (2012)	"Sexy Summer ni Yuki ga Furu" (2012)

"Lady Diamond" (Lady ダイヤモンド) is a song by Japanese idol group Sexy Zone. It was released on April 11, 2012, as its second single under Pony Canyon. The song was written by Gorō Matsui and Kōji Makaino. All tracks on the single were used as theme songs for various television series.

"Lady Diamond" was released in four editions: Regular Edition, Limited Editions A and B, and Venue Limited Edition. It ranked number one on the Oricon Singles Chart and number two on the Billboard Japan Hot 100. The single was certified gold by the Recording Industry Association of Japan (RIAJ), denoting shipments of 100,000 units.

== Release and promotion ==
Sexy Zone imitated promotions for "Lady Diamond" by performing it on NHK's music program Music Japan on April 8, 2012. The group also performed the single on TV Asahi's Music Station on April 27. The track was used as the theme song for the Fuji TV reality program Real Scope Z. "Yūki 100%" and "Kaze o Kitte" were utilized as the opening and closing theme song for NHK's anime Nintama Rantarō, respectively. "High!! High!! People" was used as the theme song for the Tokyo Broadcasting System (TBS) drama Kodomo Keisatsu.

"Lady Diamond" was released on April 11 in four editions: Regular Edition; Limited Edition A with bonus DVD content that includes the music video for the title track; Limited Edition B with bonus DVD content that includes behind-the-scenes footage of the music video; and Venue Limited Edition.

== Commercial performance ==
On the issue dated April 23, 2012, "Lady Diamond" debuted at number one on Japan's national weekly Oricon Singles Chart, selling 115,950 copies in its first week. Sexy Zone achieved the distinction of topping the chart with its introductory and follow-up single since Kis-My-Ft2 did so with its debut "Everybody Go" and second single "We Never Give Up!" four months earlier. Among teenage male acts, it marked three years and 11 months since Hey! Say! JUMP reached the pinnacle with its two initial singles "Ultra Music Power" and "Dreams Come True". On the Billboard Japan Hot 100, the song debuted at number two behind Perfume's "Spring of Life".

"Lady Diamond" was certified gold at the end of the month by the Recording Industry Association of Japan for shipments exceeding 100,000 units. According to Oricon's year-end report, the single sold 144,573 copies domestically and ranked number 55 on its list of best-selling singles.

== Track listing ==
Regular Edition
No.	Title	Lyrics	Music	Arrangement	Length
1.	"Lady Diamond" (Lady ダイヤモンド)	Gorō Matsui	Kōji Makaino	Motoki Funayama	4:54
2.	"Kaze o Kitte" (風をきって)	Gorō Matsui	Kōji Makaino	Chokkaku	4:32
3.	"High!! High!! People"	Sakuta Masaya	Takuya Harada	Suzuki "Daichi" Hideyuki	4:27
4.	"Yuuki 100%" (勇気100%)	Gorō Matsui	Kōji Makaino	Kōji Makaino	3:56
5.	"Lady Diamond" (Lady ダイヤモンド) (Inst.)		Kōji Makaino	Motoki Funayama	4:54
6.	"Kaze o Kitte" (風をきって) (Inst.)		Kōji Makaino	Chokkaku	4:32
7.	"High!! High!! People" (Inst.)		Takuya Harada	Suzuki "Daichi" Hideyuki	4:27
8.	"Yuuki 100%" (勇気100%) (Inst.)		Kōji Makaino	Kōji Makaino	3:54
Total length:					35:36

Limited Edition A and B
No.	Title	Lyrics	Music	Arrangement	Length
1.	"Lady Diamond" (Lady ダイヤモンド)	Gorō Matsui	Kōji Makaino	Motoki Funayama	4:54
2.	"Kaze o Kitte" (風をきって)	Gorō Matsui	Kōji Makaino	Chokkaku	4:32
3.	"High!! High!! People"	Sakuta Masaya	Takuya Harada	Suzuki "Daichi" Hideyuki	4:27
Total length:					13:53

Venue Limited Edition
No.	Title	Lyrics	Music	Arrangement	Length
1.	"Lady Diamond" (Lady ダイヤモンド)	Gorō Matsui	Kōji Makaino	Motoki Funayama	4:54
2.	"Kaze o Kitte" (風をきって)	Gorō Matsui	Kōji Makaino	Chokkaku	4:32
3.	"High!! High!! People"	Sakuta Masaya	Takuya Harada	Suzuki "Daichi" Hideyuki	4:27
4.	"Yuuki 100%" (勇気100%)	Gorō Matsui	Kōji Makaino	Kōji Makaino	3:56
Total length:					17:49

Limited Edition A
No.	Title	Length
1.	"Lady Diamond" (Lady ダイヤモンド) (music clip)

Limited Edition B
No.	Title	Length
1.	"Lady Diamond" (Lady ダイヤモンド) (making)

== Charts ==
=== Weekly ===
Chart (2012)	Peak position
Billboard Japan Hot 100	2
Oricon Singles Chart	1

=== Year-end ===
Chart (2012)	Peak position
Oricon Singles Chart	55
