= Hungry! =

- Starring: Osamu Mukai; Ryoko Kuninaka; Goro Inagaki; Miori Takimoto; Shohei Miura; Takashi Tsukamoto
- Country of origin: Japan
- Original language: Japanese

Production
- Production companies: Kansai TV, Horipro

Original release
- Network: Fuji TV
- Release: January 2012

Hungry! (ハングリー！, Hangurii!) is a 2012 Japanese television drama series.

== Synopsis ==
Eisuke (Osamu Mukai), a former bassist of a rock band who gave up his music dreams to carry on the tradition of his family's French restaurant. The show will involve a love triangle as Kuninaka and Takimoto play rivals for Eisuke's heart.

Maria (Ryoko Kuninaka) is Eisuke's older girlfriend who works at a bank. She is shocked to learn that Eisuke has abandoned his music to devote himself to the restaurant, leading her to uncertainty about their relationship because they don't get time for each other. Meanwhile, Chie (Takimoto Miori) is a cheerful 20-year-old college student who come from a farming family. Although she initially had a bad impression of Eisuke, she begins to develop feelings for him after tasting his cooking. It was love which started from her stomach instead of her heart.

SMAP's Inagaki Goro will play Tokio, the owner of a competing French restaurant. In the past, he was fond of the restaurant that Eisuke's mother ran, but after she died, he deceived Eisuke's father and bought out the restaurant's chefs and staff. Knowing of Eisuke's ability as a chef, Tokio views him as a rival.

Eisuke's friends, who were part of his band ROCKHEAD, are being played by Tsukamoto Takashi (guitarist), Miura Shohei (vocalist) and Chemistry's Kawabata Kaname (drummer). They help Eisuke with his restaurant.

== Cast ==
- Osamu Mukai as Eisuke
- Miori Takimoto as Chie
- Goro Inagaki as Tokio
- Ryoko Kuninaka as Maria
- Shohei Miura as Taku
- Takashi Tsukamoto as Kenta
- Kawabata Kaname as Tsuyoshi
- Sato Shori as Sasuke
- Fujii Mina as Momoko (Episode 8)
