= I Want to Hold Aono-kun so Badly I Could Die =

Japanese manga series

- First tankōbon volume cover, featuring Yuri Kariya

青野くんに触りたいから死にたい (Aono-kun ni Sawaritai kara Shinitai)
- Genre: Horror; Romance; Supernatural thriller
- Manga
- Written by: Umi Shiina
- Published by: Kodansha
- English publisher: NA: Kodansha USA
- Imprint: Afternoon KC
- Magazine: Monthly Afternoon
- Original run: December 24, 2016 – October 24, 2025
- Volumes: 14
- Television drama
- Directed by: Sumisu
- Written by: Shinya Tamada
- Studio: Socket
- Original network: Wowow
- Original run: March 18, 2022 – May 20, 2022
- Episodes: 10
- icon

I Want to Hold Aono-kun so Badly I Could Die (Japanese: 青野くんに触りたいから死にたい, Hepburn: Aono-kun ni Sawaritai kara Shinitai) is a Japanese manga series written and illustrated by Umi Shiina. It was serialized in Kodansha's seinen manga magazine Monthly Afternoon from December 2016 to October 2025, with its chapters collected in 14 tankōbon volumes. A television drama adaptation aired from March to May 2022 on Wowow.

== Plot ==
Yuri Kariya is a female high-school student who starts a relationship with another student, Ryuhei Aono, from the next class. However, two weeks later, Aono dies in a car accident. When, distraught, Yuri attempts to commit suicide, Aono appears to her as a ghost, and tells her that he will be there for her, and not to die, and Yuri accepts. They continue their "relationship", with Yuri pretending to be talking on the phone around people so as to continue talking with him.

One day, Yuri suggests that Aono should try possession. Aono is confused, but then he possesses her body briefly. Since that moment, Aono develops a second, darker personality, "Black Aono", who tries to possess people around him, becoming increasingly powerful and attempting to take Yuri to the afterworld.

Aono's best friend from before his death, Masayoshi Fujimoto, and reclusive and horror movie fanatic Mio Horie, deepen their friendship as they investigate the secret of Black Aono.

== Characters ==
Ryuhei Aono (青野 龍平, Aono Ryūhei)
Portrayed by: Shori Sato
Yuri's boyfriend. He is a male student at Kazachi High School, class 2C. He died two weeks after starting a relationship with Yuri, and appears as a ghost from then on. He has a gentle and sincere personality. However, since he became a ghost, he has developed a darker alternate personality, called "Black Aono."
Yuri Kariya (刈谷 優里, Kariya Yūri)
Portrayed by: Hikaru Takahashi
A female student at Kazachi High School, class 2D. She is a natural airhead and the owner of a single-minded personality. She was in a relationship with Aono before he died, and continues to be in a relationship with him even after he became a ghost. She is in a state of "sacrificial contract" with Aono, and her appearance has been changing due to the contract.
Masayoshi Fujimoto (藤本 雅芳, Fujimoto Masayoshi)
Portrayed by: Fūju Kamio
Aono's friend. He is a male student at Kazachi High School, class 2C. He is harsh in his words, but kind at heart. He is the only one other than Yuri who knows that Aono has become a ghost, but unlike her, he cannot see him.
Mio Horie (堀江 美桜, Horie Mio)
Portrayed by: Ririka
A female student at Kazachi High School and classmate of Yuri's. She has a deep knowledge of horror films, and cooperates with Yuuri and Fujimoto to investigate Aono.

== Media ==
=== Manga ===
Written and illustrated by Umi Shiina, I Want to Hold Aono-kun so Badly I Could Die was serialized in Kodansha's seinen manga magazine Monthly Afternoon from December 24, 2016, to September 25, 2025; an epilogue chapter was published on October 24, 2025. Kodansha collected its chapters in 14 tankōbon volumes, released from June 23, 2017, to January 22, 2026.

In North America, Kodansha USA started publishing the manga digitally in English on October 24, 2017. In August 2026, Kodansha USA announced that it will release the manga in print starting in December of the same year.

==== Volumes ====
No.	Original release date	Original ISBN	English release date	English ISBN
1	June 23, 2017	978-4-06-388272-8	October 24, 2017 (digital)	978-1-68233-945-9 (digital)
1. "My First Boyfriend" (初めての彼氏, Hajimete no Kareshi); 2. "Singing Practice" (歌の練習, Uta no Renshū); 3. "Aono-kun's Friend" (青野くんの友達, Aono-kun no Tomodachi); 4. "The Other Aono-kun" (もう一人の青野くん, Mōhitori no Aono-kun); 5. "Invader" (侵入者, Shinnyū-sha)
2	October 23, 2017	978-4-06-388296-4	December 26, 2017 (digital)	978-1-64212-016-5 (digital)
6. "Helper" (協力者, Kyōryoku-sha); 7. "The Ghost Study Group" (幽霊勉強会, Yūrei Benkyō-kai); 8. "Undressing" (脱衣, Datsui); 9. "Offering" (供物, Kumotsu); 10. "Liar" (嘘つき, Usotsuki)
3	April 23, 2018	978-4-06-511224-3	August 28, 2018 (digital)	978-1-64212-425-5 (digital)
11. "Recovery" (奪還, Dakkan); 12. "Aquarium Date" (水族館デート, Suizokukan Dēto); 13. "Sister" (お姉ちゃん, O Nēchan); 14. "The Girl Who Can See Ghosts" (幽霊が見える女の子, Yūrei ga Mieru Onnanoko); 15. "Contract" (契約, Keiyaku)
4	November 22, 2018	978-4-06-513494-8	March 26, 2019 (digital)	978-1-64212-794-2 (digital)
16. "Aono-kun and Watase-san" (青野くんと渡瀬さん, Aono-kun to Watase-san); 17. "Secret Kiss" (秘密のキス, Himitsu no Kisu); 18. "Scapegoat" (スケープゴート, Sukēpugōto); 19. "What I Can Do For You" (君のためにできること, Kimi no Tame ni Dekiru Koto); 20. "Their First Time" (初めてのエッチ, Hajimete no Ecchi)
5	May 23, 2019	978-4-06-515486-1	September 24, 2019 (digital)	978-1-64659-032-2 (digital)
21. "The Living and the Dead" (生者と死者, Shōja to Shisha); 22. "Aono-kun's Place to Return (Part 1)" (青野くんの帰る場所＜前編＞, Aono-kun no Kaeru Basho <Zenpen>); 23. "Aono-kun's Place to Return (Part 2)" (青野くんの帰る場所＜後編＞, Aono-kun no Kaeru Basho <Kōhen>); 24. "Aono-kun's Secret" (青野くんの秘密, Aono-kun no Himitsu); 25. "Sota-kun's New Friend" (蒼太くんの新しい友達, Sōta-kun no Atarashī Tomodachi)
6	January 23, 2020	978-4-06-518201-7	July 28, 2020 (digital)	978-1-64659-610-2 (digital)
26. "Yotsukubi-sama 1" (四ツ首様①); 27. "Yotsukubi-sama 2" (四ツ首様②); 28. "Yotsukubi-sama 3" (四ツ首様③); 29. "Yotsukubi-sama 4" (四ツ首様④); 30. "Yotsukubi-sama 5" (四ツ首様⑤); 31. "Yotsukubi-sama 6" (四ツ首様⑥)
7	September 23, 2020	978-4-06-520732-1	March 30, 2021 (digital)	978-1-63699-018-7 (digital)
32. "Yotsukubi-sama 7" (四ツ首様⑦); 33. "Yotsukubi-sama 8" (四ツ首様⑧); 34. "Yotsukubi-sama 9" (四ツ首様⑨); 35. "Yotsukubi-sama 10" (四ツ首様⑩); 36. "Yotsukubi-sama 11" (四ツ首様⑪); 37. "Yotsukubi-sama 12" (四ツ首様⑫); Epilogue (エピローグ, Epirōgu)
8	May 21, 2021	978-4-06-523328-3	December 21, 2021 (digital)	978-1-63699-529-8 (digital)
38. "Separate Worlds" [Part 1] (違う世界, Chigau Sekai); 39. "Separate Worlds" [Part 2] (違う世界, Chigau Sekai); 40. "If I Could Be Them 1" (あの子になれたら①, Ano Ko ni Naretara 1); 41. "If I Could Be Them 2" (あの子になれたら②, Ano Ko ni Naretara 2); 42. "If I Could Be Them 3" (あの子になれたら③, Ano Ko ni Naretara 3); 43. "Only One Seat" (席は一つ, Seki wa Hitotsu)
9	February 22, 2022	978-4-06-526864-3	August 23, 2022 (digital)	978-1-68491-407-4 (digital)
44. "Changing" (変わる, Kawaru); 45. "Senba Town" (千羽町, Senba-chō); 46. "Destined Partner" (運命の人, Unmei no Hito); 47. "Nightmare 1" (ナイトメア①, Naitomea 1); 48. "Nightmare 2" (ナイトメア②, Naitomea 2); 49. "Culture Festival" (文化祭, Bunkasai); Side Story: "Spirit Photos" (心霊写真, Shinrei Shashin); Side Story: "Baseless Accusations" (言いがかり, Īgakari); Side Story: "That First Night in Volume 1, Chapter 4 Where Aono Spent the Night as Yuri" (1巻第4話にて、青野が優里に憑依したままで過ごした初めての一晩, 1-kan Dai 4-wa nite, Aono ga Yuri ni Hyōi Shita Mama de Sugoshita Hajimete no Hitoban); Side Story: "Bath Time" (お風呂, O Furo)
10	January 23, 2023	978-4-06-530259-0	June 27, 2023 (digital)	978-1-68491-980-2 (digital)
50. "The Weeping Spouses Rocks 1" (夫婦石の涙①, Meoto Ishi no Namida 1); 51. "The Weeping Spouses Rocks 2" (夫婦石の涙②, Meoto Ishi no Namida 2); 52. "The Weeping Spouses Rocks 3" (夫婦石の涙③, Meoto Ishi no Namida 3); 53. "The Weeping Spouses Rocks 4" (夫婦石の涙④, Meoto Ishi no Namida 4); 54. "I Am Your Mother 1" (わたしはあなたのお母さん①, Watashi wa Anata no Okāsan 1); 55. "I Am Your Mother 2" (わたしはあなたのお母さん②, Watashi wa Anata no Okāsan 2)
11	November 22, 2023	978-4-06-533290-0	April 30, 2024 (digital)	979-8-88933-448-4 (digital)
56. "Exchange" (交代, Kōtai); 57. "Teppei" (鉄平); 58. "Dad" (お父さん, Otōsan); 59. "Aquarium 1" (水族館①, Suizokukan 1); 60. "Aquarium 2" (水族館②, Suizokukan 2); 61. "God" (神様, Kamisama)
12	July 23, 2024	978-4-06-536066-8	December 24, 2024 (digital)	979-8-89478-306-2 (digital)
62. "Becoming One" (1つになって, Hitotsu ni Natte); 63. "Their Waltz" (2人のワルツ, Futari no Warutsu); 64. "Midori and Yuri" (翠と優里, Midori to Yuri); 65. "How to Bring Back the Dead" (死者を蘇らせる方法, Shisha o Yomigaeraseru Hōhō)
13	August 22, 2025	978-4-06-540507-9	January 27, 2026 (digital)	979-8-89478-589-9 (digital)
66. "The Conditions for Dark Aono-kun to Appear" (黒青野くんの出現条件, Kuro Aono-kun no Shutsugen Jōken); 67. "Alone" (一人, Hitori); 68. "Birthday 1" (誕生日①, Tanjōbi 1); 69. "Birthday 2" (誕生日②, Tanjōbi 2); 70. "Birthday 3" (誕生日③, Tanjōbi 3); 71. "Birthday 4" (誕生日④, Tanjōbi 4)
14	January 22, 2026	978-4-06-542158-1	June 23, 2026 (digital)	979-8-89830-109-5 (digital)
72. "Birthday 5" (誕生日⑤, Tanjōbi 5); 73. "Birthday 6" (誕生日⑥, Tanjōbi 6); Epilogue (エピローグ, Epirōgu)

=== Live-action series ===
In May 2021, a television drama adaptation produced by Wowow was announced. The series was directed by Sumisu, with scripts by Shinya Tamada, and stars Shori Sato. It aired from March 18 to May 20, 2022.

== Reception ==
In 2018, I Want to Hold Aono-kun so Badly I Could Die ranked 14th on the fifth Next Manga Awards in the Print category. It was one of the Jury Recommended Works at the 21st Japan Media Arts Festival in 2018. In December 2019, Brutus magazine included the manga on their "Most Dangerous Manga" list, which included works with the most "stimulating" and thought-provoking themes. The manga was nominated for the 25th annual Tezuka Osamu Cultural Prize in 2021. The manga was nominated for the 45th Kodansha Manga Award in the general category in 2021.
