= Papa and Daddy's Home Cooking =

Japanese manga series

- First tankōbon volume cover

パパと親父のウチご飯 (Papa to Oyaji no Uchi Gohan)
- Genre: Cooking
- Manga
- Written by: Yuu Toyota
- Published by: Shinchosha
- English publisher: NA: Medibang
- Magazine: Monthly Comic Bunch
- Original run: April 21, 2014 – July 21, 2020
- Volumes: 13
- Manga

Papa to Oyaji no Uchi Nomi
- Written by: Yuu Toyota
- Published by: Shinchosha
- Magazine: Go Go Bunch; Comic Bunch Web
- Original run: April 10, 2016 – July 6, 2021
- Volumes: 3
- Television drama
- Directed by: Takuma Satō; Naomi Kinoshita
- Written by: Ureha Shimada; Tatsuya Yamanishi
- Studio: TV Asahi; Storm Labels
- Original network: TV Asahi
- Original run: October 4, 2025 – present
- Episodes: 2

Papa and Daddy's Home Cooking (パパと親父のウチご飯, Papa to Oyaji no Uchi Gohan) is a Japanese manga series written and illustrated by Yuu Toyota. It was serialized in Shinchosha's Monthly Comic Bunch magazine from April 2014 to July 2020. A live-action television drama adaptation premiered in October 2025.

== Characters ==
Akira Sengoku (千石哲, Sengoku Akira)
Voiced by: Yuichi Nakamura (drama CD)
Portrayed by: So Matsushima
Masahiro Harumi (晴海昌弘, Harumi Masahiro)
Voiced by: Takahiro Sakurai (drama CD)
Portrayed by: Jin Shirasu
Airi Sengoku (千石愛梨, Sengoku Airi)
Voiced by: Ari Ozawa (drama CD)
Portrayed by: Nono Tanahashi
Seiichirō Harumi (晴海清一郎, Harumi Seiichirō)
Voiced by: Mutsumi Tamura (drama CD)
Portrayed by: Sakura
Yukari Mayumi (檀ゆかり, Mayumi Yukari)
Portrayed by: Misako Renbutsu
Tatsuya Akutsu (阿久津竜也, Akutsu Tatsuya)
Portrayed by: Shūto Inomata

== Media ==
=== Manga ===
Written and illustrated by Yuu Toyota, Papa and Daddy's Home Cooking was serialized in Shinchosha's Monthly Comic Bunch magazine from April 21, 2014, to July 21, 2020. Its chapters were compiled into thirteen volumes from December 9, 2014, to November 9, 2020.

The series is published in English on the Mangamo app. Medibang has released digital volumes in English since January 2023.

A spin-off manga centered around snacks, titled Papa to Oyaji no Uchi Nomi was initially serialized in the Go Go Bunch magazine starting on April 10, 2016. It was later transferred to the Comic Bunch Web manga website after Go Go Bunch discontinued publication on February 9, 2018, and continued until July 6, 2021. The spin-off's chapters were compiled into three volumes from April 7, 2018, to November 9, 2021.

==== Volume list ====
No.	Original release date	Original ISBN	English release date	English ISBN
1	December 9, 2014	978-4-10-771788-7	January 10, 2023	—
2	June 9, 2015	978-4-10-771822-8	January 10, 2023	—
3	November 9, 2015	978-4-10-771850-1	March 28, 2023	—
4	April 9, 2016	978-4-10-771888-4; 978-4-10-771864-8 (SE)	June 27, 2023	—
5	September 9, 2016	978-4-10-771916-4	—	—
6	April 8, 2017	978-4-10-771971-3	—	—
7	October 8, 2017	978-4-10-772017-7	—	—
8	February 9, 2018	978-4-10-772050-4	—	—
9	September 7, 2019	978-4-10-772116-7	—	—
10	February 9, 2019	978-4-10-772159-4	—	—
11	September 9, 2019	978-4-10-772216-4	—	—
12	March 9, 2020	978-4-10-772265-2	—	—
13	November 9, 2020	978-4-10-772327-7	—	—

==== Papa to Oyaji no Uchi Nomi ====
No.	Release date	ISBN
1	April 8, 2018	978-4-10-771967-6
2	September 7, 2018	978-4-10-772115-0
3	November 9, 2021	978-4-10-772434-2

=== Drama ===
A live-action television drama adaptation was announced on September 5, 2025. The drama is produced by TV Asahi and Storm Labels and directed by Takuma Satō and Naomi Kinoshita, with scripts written by Ureha Shimada and Tatsuya Yamanishi. It premiered on TV Asahi on October 4, 2025.

== Reception ==
The series has 2.6 million copies in circulation as of August 2023.

== See also ==
- Cherry Magic! Thirty Years of Virginity Can Make You a Wizard?!, another manga series by Yuu Toyota
