= Misako Renbutsu =

Japanese actress (born 1991)

- 蓮佛 美沙子
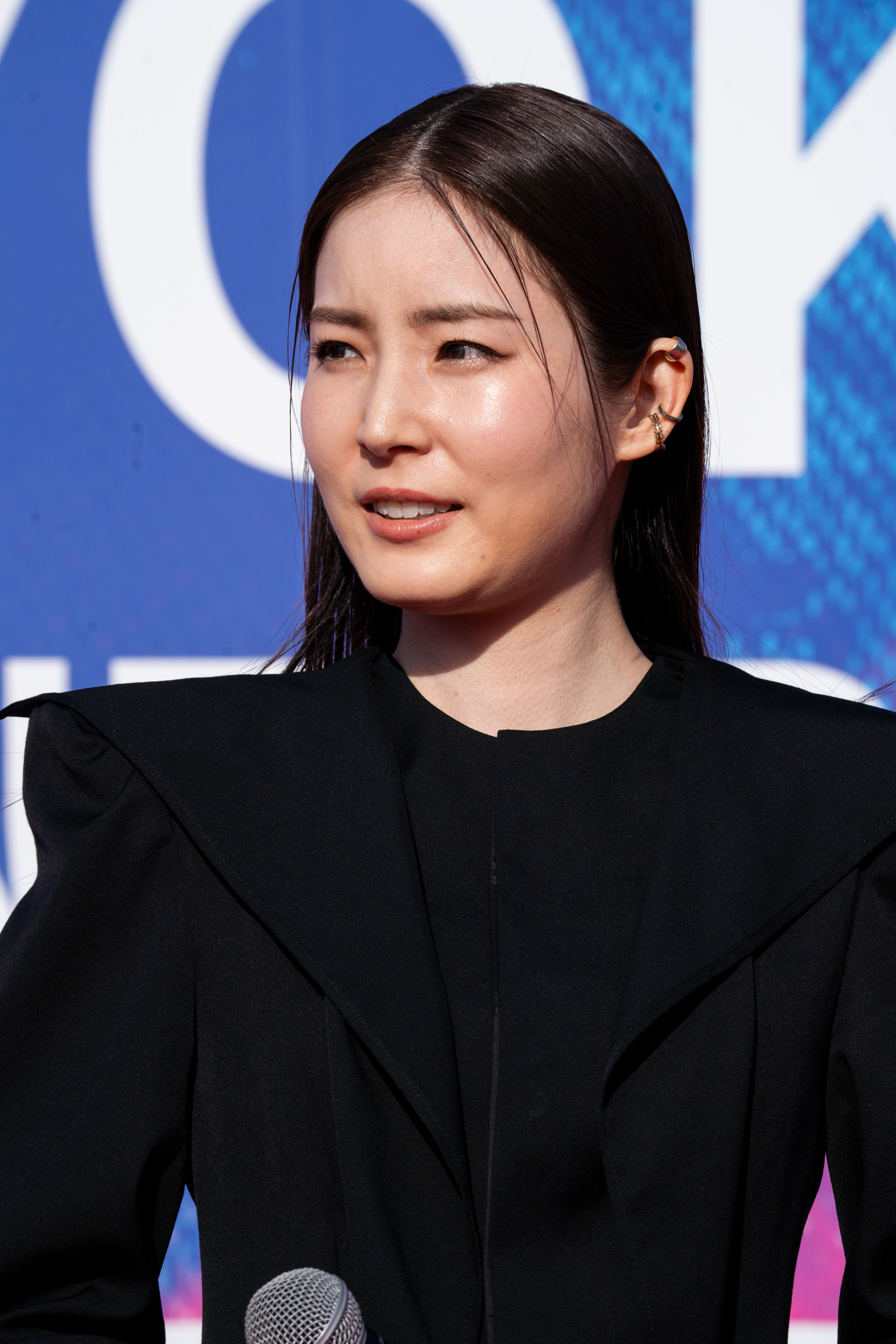
- Renbutsu in 2024
- Born: February 27, 1991 (age 34); Tottori, Tottori Prefecture, Japan
- Years active: 2006–present
- Agent: WestSide (Sony Music Artists, Inc.)
- Notable work: Mayu Yajima in The Battery (film) (2007); Kazumi Saito in Switching - Goodbye Me (2007); Nanase Hida in Nanase Again (2008)

Misako Renbutsu (蓮佛 美沙子, Renbutsu Misako; born February 27, 1991) is a Japanese actress. She won the Grand Prix award at the Super Heroine Audition Miss Phoenix in 2005.

== Filmography ==
=== Television ===
- Uzukawamura Jiken (2022), Hitomi
- Ōoku: The Inner Chambers (2023), Odai
- Papa and Daddy's Home Cooking (2025), Yukari Mayumi
- Hirayasumi (2025), Saki Noguchi
- The Ghost Writer's Wife (2026), Ran

=== Movies ===
- River (2011), Hikari
- Fullmetal Alchemist (2017), Riza Hawkeye
- The Memory Eraser (2020), Kyoko Sawada
- Godai: The Wunderkind (2020), Toyoko
- Fullmetal Alchemist: The Revenge of Scar (2022), Riza Hawkeye
- Fullmetal Alchemist: The Final Alchemy (2022), Riza Hawkeye
- 2 Women (2022), Hatsuko
- Home Sweet Home (2023), Hitomi
- Actress Wouldn't Cry (2023), Rie
