= Fatal (song) =

Single by Gemn

from the album Dekai
- Language: Japanese
- Released: July 4, 2024
- Genre: J-pop; anime song
- Length: 3:40
- Label: Mastersix Foundation
- Songwriter: Tatsuya Kitani
- Producer: Giga

Kento Nakajima singles chronology
"Fatal" (2024)	"Hitogoto" (2024)

Tatsuya Kitani singles chronology
"Always Be with You XD" (2024)	"Fatal" (2024)	"Chained" (2024)

Music video
- "Fatal" on YouTube

"Fatal" (ファタール, Fatāru) is a song by Japanese duo Gemn, consisting of Japanese singer and actor Kento Nakajima and singer-songwriter Tatsuya Kitani. It was released by Mastersix Foundation on July 4, 2024, as the opening theme for the second season of Japanese anime series Oshi no Ko. Commercially, the song peaked at number three on the Billboard Japan Hot 100 and number two on the Oricon Combined Singles Chart.

== Background and release ==
On May 26, 2024, Japanese anime series Oshi no Ko uploaded the anime's first trailer, revealing that the opening theme for the anime's second season would be "Fatal", which was performed by Gemn, without any information of the artist. On the same day, the artist's website was launched to countdown for more details, including letters from members, some lyrics, and liner notes. The identity of the artist was unveiled on June 30, to be Kento Nakajima and Tatsuya Kitani, as well as the song's release date, July 4, 2024. The CD single format—"Gemn", "Anime", and standard—was released in Japan on September 4, and internationally by Black Screen Records in October 2024. "Fatal" was later included on Kitani's studio album, Dekai (2026).

== Music video ==
An accompanying music video for "Fatal" premiered via Kitani's YouTube channel on July 5, 2024. It was filmed in South Korea and directed by Kim Woo-je of Etui Collective. The music video included the diverse sets and dance scenes of Nakajima and Kitani.

== Live performances ==
Gemn debuted the live performance of "Fatal" at the Rock in Japan Festival on August 4, 2024.

== Accolades ==
Awards and nominations for "Fatal"
Ceremony	Year	Award	Result	Ref.
AnimaniA Awards	2025	Best Anime Song	Nominated	
Anime Grand Prix	2025	Best Theme Song	8th place	
Anime Trending Awards	2025	Opening Theme Song of the Year	Nominated	
Crunchyroll Anime Awards	2025	Best Anime Song	Nominated	
Crunchyroll Anime Awards	2025	Best Opening Sequence	Nominated	
Japan Expo Awards	2025	Daruma for Best Opening	Nominated	
MTV Video Music Awards Japan	2025	Best Trending Video	Won	
Music Awards Japan	2025	Best of Listeners' Choice: Japanese Song	Nominated	
Reiwa Anisong Awards	2025	Composition Award (Note: Tatsuya Kitani credited as nominee.)	Won	

== Track listing ==
- Digital download, and streaming
1. "Fatal" (ファタール) – 3:40
- CD single, digital download, and streaming
1. "Fatal" – 3:40
2. "Fatal" (Kento Nakajima only version) – 3:40
3. "Fatal" (Tatsuya Kitani only version) – 3:40
4. "Fatal" (instrumental) – 3:40
- Blu-ray (Gemn edition)
1. "Fatal" music video – 3:39
2. "Making of Gemn" – 19:15
- Blu-ray (Anime edition)
1. "TV Anime Oshi no Ko Season 2 Non-Credit Opening Movie" – 1:29

== Credits and personnel ==
- Kento Nakajima – vocals
- Tatsuya Kitani – vocals, songwriter
- Giga – arrangement, mixing
- Ayaka Toki – mixing
- Hidekazu Sakai – mastering

== Charts ==
=== Weekly charts ===
Weekly chart performance for "Fatal"
Chart (2024)	Peak position
Global Excl. US (Billboard)	157
Japan (Japan Hot 100)	3
Japan Hot Animation (Billboard Japan)	2
Japan (Oricon)	5
Japan Combined Singles (Oricon)	2
Japan Anime Singles (Oricon)	2

=== Monthly charts ===
Monthly chart performance for "Fatal"
Chart (2024)	Position
Japan (Oricon)	19
Japan Anime Singles (Oricon)	4

=== Year-end charts ===
Year-end chart performance for "Fatal"
Chart (2024)	Position
Japan (Japan Hot 100)	54
Japan Hot Animation (Billboard Japan)	13

== Certifications ==
Certifications for "Fatal"
Region	Certification	Certified units/sales
Streaming
Japan (RIAJ)	Platinum	100,000,000^{†}
^{†} Streaming-only figures based on certification alone.
