= April Bride =

- Film poster
- Directed by: Ryūichi Hiroki
- Written by: Hiroshi Saito
- Starring: Nana Eikura; Eita
- Release date: May 9, 2009 (Japan)
- Running time: 129 minutes
- Country: Japan
- Language: Japanese
- Box office: $32,112,343

April Bride (Japanese: 余命1ヶ月の花嫁, Hepburn: Yomei Ikkagetsu no Hanayome) is a 2009 Japanese biographical romantic drama film directed by Ryūichi Hiroki.

== Plot ==
On April 5, 2007, a couple married in a church. At first glance, it was a typical wedding. The bride, however, was suffering from late-stage breast cancer and had been given only a month to live.

== Cast ==
- Nana Eikura: Chie Nagashima
- Eita: Taro Akasu
- Satomi Tezuka
- Misako Yasuda
- Akira Emoto

== Notes ==
- Based on the true story of Chie Nagashima, a woman afflicted with breast cancer and her husband Taro Akasu.
- Chie Nagashima's story was also told in a 2007 TBS documentary.

== Reception ==
April Bride was number one in the box office in its opening weekend. Mark Schilling of The Japan Times gave the film a mostly positive review.
