= Paidy =

Japanese online payment service

- Headquarters: Japan
- Parent: PayPal
- Website: www.paidy.com

Paidy is a Japanese deferred online payment service (called buy now, pay later) for online shops.

== Corporate history ==
Established in March 2008 under the trade name of Exchange Corporation Co., Ltd., the main business was the social lending service "AQUSH". After launching the online payment service "Paidy" in October 2014, gradually shifted the focus of the business to "Paidy", and the social lending business closed new recruitment in June 2018.

On September 7, 2021, PayPal Holdings Inc announced that it would acquire it for US$2.7 billion (about 300 billion yen).

== Service overview ==
Paidy has partnered with an online shopping site to offer users a "deferred payment service" that can be used without a credit card.

Payments made using Paidy will be combined into one (if used on multiple sites), and the billed amount will be notified to the registered mobile phone by the 3rd of the following month by email and SMS. The user pays the billed amount by bank transfer or convenience store payment by the 10th. (A remittance fee will be charged depending on the payment method. Also, automatic debit by direct debit is possible.) A service called "Paidy Plus" was launched in April 2020, which implements identity verification and usage limit setting functions. Currently available at over 700,000 stores including Amazon and Qoo10.

Paidy is unusual among the world's buy-now-pay-later providers because it allows Japanese consumers to purchase items online and pay them off each month in person at local convenience stores.
