= Sei Hatsuno =

Japanese writer of mystery and thriller (born 1973)

- Born: 1973 (age 52–53); Shimizu city, Shizuoka, Japan
- Occupation: Writer
- Writing career
- Language: Japanese
- Period: 2002–present
- Genres: Mystery, thriller
- Notable work: Haruchika series
- Notable awards: Yokomizo Seishi Mystery Prize (2002)

Sei Hatsuno (初野 晴, Hatsuno Sei; born 1973) is a Japanese writer of mystery and thriller. He is a member of the Honkaku Mystery Writers Club of Japan.

When he was at Hosei University, he was moved and influenced by honkaku (orthodox) mystery novels such as The Decagon House Murders, written by Yukito Ayatsuji, and Soji Shimada's works and he started writing.

He began his career as writer when he won the Yokomizo Seishi Mystery Prize, an annual Japanese literary prize for unpublished mystery novels, in 2002 for the novel Mizu no Tokei (Water Clock). One of the selection committee members of the year was Yukito Ayatsuji.

He is an avid fan of mystery novels of Seishi Yokomizo and Jeffrey Archer.

== Awards and nominations ==
- 2002 – Yokomizo Seishi Mystery Prize: Mizu no Tokei (Water Clock)
- 2008 – Nominee for Mystery Writers of Japan Award for Best Short Story: "Taishutsu Gēmu" ("Exit Game") (The third short story of Haruchika series)
- 2013 – Nominee for Mystery Writers of Japan Award for Best Novel or Linked Short Stories: Sennen Jurietto (One Thousand Years Juliet) (The fourth book of Haruchika series)

== Bibliography ==
=== Haruchika series (Haruta & Chika series) ===
Each book includes four short stories.

1. Taishutsu Gēmu (退出ゲーム), 2008 (Exit Game)
2. Hatsukoi Somurie (初恋ソムリエ), 2009 (First Love Sommelier)
3. Kūsō Orugan (空想オルガン), 2010 (Fantasy Organ)
4. Sennen Jurietto (千年ジュリエット), 2012 (Thousand-year Juliet)
5. Wakusei Karon (惑星カロン), 2015 (Planet Karon)

=== Standalone novels ===
- Mizu no Tokei (水の時計), 2002 (Water Clock)
- Shikkoku no Ōji (漆黒の王子), 2004 (The Jet Black Prince)
- Nibun no Ichi no Kishi (1/2の騎士), 2008 (1/2 Knight)
- Towairaito Myūjiamu (トワイライト博物館), 2009 (Twilight Museum)
- Watashi no Nōma Jīn (わたしのノーマジーン), 2011 (My Norma Jean)
- Mukō-gawa no Yūen (向こう側の遊園), 2012 (The Ulterior Amusement Park) aka. Kamara to Amara no Oka (カマラとアマラの丘)
- PCP -Perfect Crime Party- (PCP -完全犯罪党-, PCP -Kanzen Hanzaitō-), 2015 – based on the fictional manga series seen in Bakuman

== See also ==
- Japanese detective fiction
