= Fuma Kikuchi =

Japanese singer, actor and performer

Fuma Kikuchi 菊池 風磨
- Born: March 7, 1995 (age 31); Tokyo, Japan
- Origin: Japanese
- Occupations: Singer, actor, pop idol
- Years active: 2008–present
- Labels: Starto Entertainment; Over the Top Records
- Member of: Timelesz
- Website: ovtp.jp/timelesz/fuma-kikuchi

Fuma Kikuchi (菊池 風磨, Kikuchi Fūma; born March 7, 1995) is a Japanese singer, actor and performer and is a member of timelesz (formerly known as Sexy Zone).

== Career ==
In 2008, B.I.Shadow was formed as a Johnny's Jr. group. At that time the members were: Kento Nakajima, Fuma Kikuchi, and Misaki Takahata. During that year, they acted in the television drama Scrap Teacher.

On September 29, 2011, it was announced that a new five-member group called Sexy Zone would be formed and become a special supporter of "FIVB World Cup Volleyball 2011". Kikuchi was part of the group.

In April 2024, Kikuchi reported the opening of a personal fan club, with special benefits for early registrants, and a fan club member-exclusive event in Autumn. It was also reported that Kikuchi had established an agent contract with the agency.

Kikuchi was appointed brand ambassador for Domino's Japan in September 2024. In November 2025, he was appointed as brand ambassador for Koizumi Seiki's Koizumi Beauty.

On February 7, 2026, Kikuchi released his first photobook. According to an interview during the book's release press conference, the one who inspired him to make it was Hey! Say! JUMP's Ryosuke Yamada, who had released his own to celebrate his 30th birthday. The name of the book, "Latido", was chosen as a consequence of the place where the photoshoot took place, San Sebastián in Spain. Kikuchi commented that he wanted the book to have a Spanish name, and he chose that name because of its meaning, "heartbeat". Kikuchi wanted people to "feel" his heartbeat in every photo. The book ranked 1st in its first week on the "Billboard Japan Book Hot 100" chart.

Kikuchi hosts his first music program starting in April 2026, with a special episode airing in March for the Kanto area. Yoru no oto ~Tokyo Midnight Music~ (夜の音 -TOKYO MIDNIGHT MUSIC-) is a program that draws out the true feelings of the artists. With one artist per week, it examines the meaning behind their songs.

== Personal life ==
On April 22, 2026, Starto Entertainment reported that Kikuchi was taking some time off his activities due to health problems. According to the report, Kikuchi informed of having problems with his throat, and that he was taking the recommendations of his doctor to follow treatment. On his fan club, he apologized to his followers for the trouble caused and for worrying them. He lamented the bad timimg of his condition during the second year of his group and asked his fans to continue supporting his group until his return. Because of this, Kikuchi missed the performances in Aichi and Shizuoka of the "We're timelesz LIVE TOUR 2026 episode 2 MOMENTUM" concert tour.

== Filmography ==
=== Television appearances ===
- Sexy Zone Channel (co-host, with other Sexy Zone members) (Fuji TV, 2014)
- NTV's 24-Hr TV (2022) (co-host, as member of YouTube channel Jyaninochaneru)
- Geinōjin ga honki de kangaeta! Dokkiri GP (2020- ) (first regular MC, prank creator)
- Kikuchi Fuma no Yurusenai TV (March 2022- ) (host)
- Sekai one room girl (2024, TBS) (Host)
- timelesz project ~AUDITION~ (2024, Netflix)
  - timelesz Project ~REAL~ (2026, Netflix)
- NTV Sports men's basketball national team coverage / FIBA Men's Asian Cup coverage (2025)
- Aberē on'na 〜 kurabeta garu on'na-tachi 〜 (2026, Fuji TV) co-host with Haraichi's Yū Sawabe
- Love Power Kingdom (2026, Abema) MC
- Kotōge jizō Tabi ~ Kotōge jizō to okitsune Fuma~ (2026, 4-episode special) (co-host with Eiji Kotoge)
- Yoru no oto ~Tokyo Midnight Music~ (夜の音 -TOKYO MIDNIGHT MUSIC-) (April 2026–)
- Anata no gimon sukkiri kaishō! ! Zenryoku shakariki chōsa-dan (2026) (co–hosted with Akira Kawashima)

=== Television dramas ===
- Scrap Teacher (NTV / 2008), Fuma Kusumoto
- Hancho ~ Jinnan Police Station Asaka Unit ~ Season 3 (2009) Episode 2 (guest)
- Future Diary ~ Another:World (Fuji TV / 2012), Kosaka Oji
- Kamen Teacher (NTV / 2013), Kinzo Takehara
- GTO: Great Teacher Onizuka (Fuji TV, KTV / 2014), Ryuichi Kuzuki
- Shin Naniwa Kin'yūdō jp (Fuji TV / 2015), Hayato Ōhira
- Flowers for Algernon (TBS / 2015), Kazushige Kokubo
- The Girl Who Leapt Through Time (NTV / 2016), Shohei Fukamachi
- Uso no Sensou (Fuji TV / 2017), Kazuki Yahiro
- Babel Kyusaku (NTV / 2020), Kyusaku Mitsuhiro
- Itaike ni Koishite (NTV / 2021), Iizuka Masaki
- Fight Song (TBS / 2022), Natsukawa Shingo
- Captured Hospital (NTV / 2023), Koichi Yamato (Aoi Oni (Blue Demon)), leader of the group that has taken a hospital hostage. (First time appearing with fellow Johnny artist Sho Sakurai)
  - Captured New Airport (NTV, 2024) Koichi Yamato
  - Captured Broadcasting Station (NTV, 2025) Koichi Yamato
- Giver Taker (Wowow / 2023), Ruoto Kishi
- Tonari no otoko yoku taberu (TV Tokyo / 2023), Sota Motomiya
- Our Fake Marriage (Fuji TV, KTV / 2023), Takumi Natsume
- Tax Solver (NTV / 2023), Soichiro Aiba
- The Reason We Fall in Love (TV Asahi, 2024) Tomoya Kurosawa
- Kochira yobi jieieiyūho?! (NTV, 2026) Nagare / Nagare itsuki

=== Movies ===
- Kamen Teacher The Movie (2014), Kinzo Takehara
- To the Supreme! (2022), Reito Asai
- #Iwilltellyouthetruth (2025), Kiriyama

== Other activities ==
=== YouTube ===
A new Johnny's YouTube channel called ジャにのちゃんねる (Jyaninochannel), led by Arashi's Kazunari Ninomiya, was opened on April 25, 2021. Kikuchi was revealed as the third member to participate, on April 28, in the channel's 3rd official video.

=== Radio ===
- Hoursz (Tokyo FM, 2025) (MC)

== Commercials ==
- Asahi Group Holdings, Ltd.
  - Asahi Super Dry beer (2022) With fellow Sexy Zone member Kento Nakajima
  - Clear Asahi beer (April 2023) As part of Jyaninochannel
- Chōjuno sato(長寿乃里)
  - Shikari facial cleansing pack (2024-)
- Domino's Pizza Japan (2024- ) (brand ambassador)
- Julia Ivy Co., Ltd
  - HBL (2026)
- Koizumi Seiki
  - Koizumi Beauty (brand ambassador, 2025)
- Leverage Inc.
  - VALX protein drink (brand ambassador) (2025- )
- NEC Corporation
  - NEC Networks & System Integration Corporation (2025)
- PayPal Holdings, Inc.
  - Paidy (2025–)
- Procter and Gamble
  - Bold gel ball detergent (2022- )
- Rakuten
  - Rakuma (2022)
- Recruit
  - Jaran (2026–)

== Solo songs ==
Year	Title	Details	Ref.
2012	Rouge	Featured on album "One Sexy Zone"	
2013	Fake	Featured on single "Bai Bai Du Bai: See you again / A My Girl Friend" (バィバィDuバィ～See you again～ / A My Girl Friend) Limited Edition F	
2014	It's Going Down!	Featured on single "Otoko Never Give Up" (男never give up) Limited Edition F	
2015	20 -Tw/Nty-	Featured on album "Sexy Power3"	
2015	Party up!	Featured on album "Sexy Power3"	
2015	My Lovin' Season	Featured on single "Cha-Cha-Cha Champion" (Cha-Cha-Chaチャンピオン) Sexy Zone Shop Edition F	
2015	Hello	Featured on single "Colorful Eyes" (カラフル Eyes) Limited Edition C	
2016	But...	Featured on album "Welcome to Sexy Zone"	
2016	...More	Featured on album "Sexy Zone 5th Anniversary Best" Limited Edition B	
2017	My Life	Featured on Blu-ray & DVD "Sexy Zone presents Sexy Tour 2017 ～ STAGE" Limited Edition Special CD	
2019	Cocoa	Featured on album "PAGES" Regular Edition	
2020	HAPPY END	Featured on album "POP x STEP!?" Regular Edition	
2023	My World	Featured on album "Chapter II" Regular Edition	
