= Timelesz =

Japanese boy band

- Also known as: Sexy Zone
- Origin: Tokyo, Japan
- Genre: J-pop
- Years active: 2011–present
- Labels: Pony Canyon; Over The Top/Universal
- Spinoffs: B.I.Shadow
- Members: Fuma Kikuchi; Shori Sato; So Matsushima; Taiki Shinozuka; Masaki Hashimoto; Takuto Teranishi; Yoshitaka Hara
- Past members: Kento Nakajima (formerly Sexy Zone); Marius Yo (formerly Sexy Zone); Shuto Inomata
- Website: ovtp.jp

Timelesz (stylized as timelesz, formerly known as Sexy Zone) is a seven-member Japanese boy band managed by Starto Entertainment (formerly of Johnny & Associates).

As Sexy Zone, the group consisting of Shori Sato, Kento Nakajima, Marius Yo, Fuma Kikuchi and So Matsushima, debuted in 2011, with their group age average 14.2, breaking the record in the agency for the youngest group to debut. They were the 5th group from Johnny & Associates to debut as special supporters for the "FIVB World Cup Volleyball", after V6 (1995), Arashi (1999), NEWS (2003) and Hey! Say! JUMP (2007). In 2013 they appeared in Kouhaku for the first time. They sold 3 million copies in Japan. Yo left the group and retired from the entertainment industry in 2022. Nakajima left the group on March 31, 2024.

As Timelesz, they started official activities on April 1, 2024, with the three remaining members. Almost a year later, a new era of timelesz started on February 15, 2025, after holding open auditions to select new members to add to the group. 18,922 candidates auditioned, out of which 5 new members were ultimately chosen, with timelesz subsequently resuming activities as an 8-person group. On October 1, 2026 after Starto's decision to revoke member Inomata's contract due to his arrest on assault charges on September 19, the group was left with 7 members.

== Career ==
=== As Sexy Zone ===
Sexy Zone was announced as a group in a press conference on September 29, 2011. Johnny & Associates's CEO Johnny Kitagawa said, "The group name came from Michael Jackson's sexiness". The members were revealed to be Kento Nakajima, Fuma Kikuchi, Shori Sato, So Matsushima, and Marius Yo. Kitagawa chose the members considering the "sexiness of men". The average age of the members at the debut was 14.2 years, breaking the record held by Hey! Say! JUMP, which was 15 years.

After the press conference, the members appeared in Teigeki Johnnys Imperial Theatre Special "Kis-My-Ft2 with Johnny's Jr.", and premiered their debut song "Sexy Zone", which was subsequently released on November 16, 2011, from Pony Canyon. This song was also the image song of the 2011 FIVB Women's World Cup and the 2011 FIVB Men's World Cup, with the group becoming the events' special supporters, the fifth group in the agency, after V6, Arashi, News and Hey! Say! Jump. Sexy Zone would repeat as Musical Ambassadors for the FIVB Volleyball World Cup on March 2, 2015, where they performed their 10th single, Cha-Cha-Cha-Champion and announced the players as they entered the court. They continued supporting the Japanese volleyball team via their songs "With you" (2012), Kimi no tame noku ga iru" (2012), "Shouri no hi made" (2016), and others.

By May 2014, Sexy Zone was working as three groups: Matsushima was paired with Kaito Matsukura and Genta Matsuda, now members of Travis Japan, then of Johnny's Jr., as "Sexy Matsu"; Marius was paired with Genki Iwahashi and Yuta Jinguji, former King & Prince members (Johnny’s Jr. at the time), as "Sexy Boyz"; and the main group (which would keep the name of Sexy Zone), that would focus on Nakajima, Kikuchi and Sato. The three groups, together with the fans (called "Sexy Girls"), would become known as "Sexy Family". It would be the first time that a group would not have a fixed number of members. Three would remain as core, and the other members would be picked from the "younger sibling groups" (Sexy Matsu and Sexy Boyz). It was reported by Nikkan Sports in 2014 that the group's then-upcoming single, their seventh, "Otoko Never Give Up", was recorded by only three of its five members, as later did their eighth "Kimi ni Hitomebore" and ninth single "Cha-Cha-Cha Champion", featuring only members Kento Nakajima, Fuma Kikuchi and Shori Sato. This resulted in rumors amongst fans about the future of Marius and Matsushima, the two youngest members of the group. However, they were guaranteed that the two youngest would not be leaving, they would just be expanding the range of the group by working in their own projects. For their 10th single, "Colorful Eyes", released in December 2015, Marius and Matsushima returned to Sexy Zone, resuming activities as a 5-member group.

The Japanese release of Transformers: Rise of the Beasts, released in 2023, uses their song "Try This One More Time" as the ending theme.

The group performed in their last concert stage as Sexy Zone on December 26, 2023, following their decision to change the group's name as a consequence of the agency's sexual abuse scandal. This decision was revealed in their official fan club, and by member Kento Nakajima in an Instagram post in October. It was revealed on January 8, 2024, that the name change would take place on March 31, and that Nakajima would leave the group the same day, but would remain in the agency as a solo idol.

On March 31, 2024, the group had their last performance via a streamed live, carried by their official fan site, their group and individual official Instagram accounts, and on their YouTube channel. Former member Marius Yo also appeared via video call. The four-men group performed a total of ten songs, interspersed between talking moments, ending with Nakajima giving his last "Sexy thank you".

=== As Timelesz ===
==== Work as a trio ====
On April 1, 2024, the three remaining members appeared in a streamed live, in which they announced, not only the group's new name, but a new project. The group, now called "timelesz", which was taken as a reminder of their origin (from the song "Timeless", one of the last sung as a 5-men group, and the "sz" from the group's previous name), announced they would be holding auditions for new members, as well as a 7-city, 25 concert tour. They also announced the name for the fandom, "secondz", with the reading of the name ("secondz" or "secandz") being put to a survey. Regarding the concert series, "We're timelesz Live Tour 2024 episode0", it was announced to take place from June 22, 2024 (Hokkaido), till August 25, 2024 (Osaka)

The group released their first extended play under the new name in June 2024. The eponymous single, out in three formats (deluxe edition, limited edition, and standard edition), included the previously released songs "Honne to Tatemae", "Jinsei Yūgi", and "Puzzle". The lead song from the new EP, "Anthem", was written and produced by Tomohisa Yamashita. Yamashita's comment on the song: "I wanted them to sing about the strength of turning the impossible into the possible. I wrote these lyrics because I thought that having them sing this song now would give courage and hope to many people!". The song was premiered on their radio program "timelesz's QRZONE", the music video was released the following day in their official YouTube.

==== Timelesz Project and the new members ====
As revealed in April 2024, the group held auditions for new members. Out of 18,922 candidates, 350 passed to the second stage. This part of the recruitment was taped for the Netflix series "timelesz project -AUDITION-", with the members screening every candidate. The Netflix series started distribution on September 13 in Japan, and later worldwide. A sort of "director's cut" backstage series, with comments by the members, has been shared in YouTube under the name "timelesz behind the audition" as companion series to the Netflix one.

A single, "Because", was released on November 20, and was their collective 27th single, but the first as timelesz.

The last episode of the Netflix series, aired on February 15, 2025. After singing the last pair of songs ("Run" and timelesz' new single, "Rock This Party"), the winners of the project to be the new members were revealed: Shuto Inomata, Taiki Shinozuka, Masaki Hashimoto, as well as Starto members Takuto Teranishi and Yoshitaka Hara. The new members were introduced to the press 5 minutes after the end of the program. In the press conference, Kikuchi proposed a toast, giving each of the new members a colored drink, which ended being the color each one was to adopt: Shinozuka, white, for him to "look for your own color"; Teranishi, light blue, "support the people around while being calm, trustworthy, and mature"; Hashimoto, pink, "cute, yet strong and passionate"; Inomata, yellow, "kind, loving and positive mind" (Hara added that Inomata is like the sun "I hope that the sense of closeness will permeate the fans", while Kikuchi joked on the choice of color, not knowing if he should have chosen "Yamabuki color"). As Sato started the toast, Hara blurted out that his drink was bitter, and Matsushima smiled saying "let's go on with this". Hara asked Kikuchi if he had prepared a normal, "refreshing drink", and he answered "Sorry, it was a mistake". Hara's color is yellow-green.

==== Start as an eight-person group ====
The new group formation released a digital single, "Rock This Party", on February 28. The single is accompanied by a compilation album, released under the name Hello! We Are Timelesz, which is a selection of 12 songs, mostly of the Sexy Zone era.

The 8-member group had its first appearance on television on "Nino san", of which Kikuchi is a regular.

Two days after the end of the Netflix documentary, the 8 members were involved in Fuji TV's Dokkiri GP, of which Kikuchi is a member. The program, aired on March 15, 2025, had a section called "Dokkiri GP Presents 'timelesz project-Audition-' Special Edition", showing the 5 new members being the victims of pranks by the 3 original. Called to a campground location in Chiba, the 5 new members (together with the original) are to film Timelesz' new (fake) crown program, and find themselves with (slightly nervous instigators) Sato and Matsushima facing a table with silver dome lids, which hides a pie bazooka, where the new members are supposed to guess what high-class ingredients are hidden. They end up covered in cream. A laughing Kikuchi, who comes out from hiding, calls out "Today's prank is also an audition to see if the new members will be hooked on "Dokkiri GP"". At the end, surprise pranks, with Kikuchi's scream of "I can't forgive this!" echoing through the campsite, have the new members laughing and celebrating too.

Timelesz had their first musical performance on television, under the new system, on NTV's "with Music" on March 8, 2025.

Timelesz announced the release of their first album, "Fam", on June 11, 2025, as well as the music video for their single "Rock this Party" on March 21 on their official YouTube. The music video was filmed in Hawaii, with the theme being "first family trip", and both the video and the album's concept being "big family", with the new members, the people behind the scenes and the fans (secondz) in mind. The album's 13-song playlist includes "Rock this Party", a new 8-member version of "Anthem" and other new songs (name yet to be decided).

Timelesz was in charge of the support song for NTV basketball starting in July 2025. The rap part of "Steal the show" was written by Kikuchi, who was appointed as special anchor.

The group's first 8-person tour, "We're timelesz LIVE TOUR 2025 episode 1 ~FAM~", started in Chiba at the Lala Arena Tokyo Bay on June 28, 2025 and is scheduled to end in Shizuoka at the Ecopa Arena on August 24, 2025. In their performance at the Yokohama Arena on August 6, where their new song "Steal The Show" was performed live for the first time, it was announced that the group would have their first "Dome" performances at Kyocera Dome Osaka on December 26–27, and at Tokyo Dome on January 7–8, 2026. In addition, it was revealed that the song would be released on November 12 as the first CD single "Steal The Show/Recipe" under the current system, "timelesz project -AUDITION- Special Edition" would be released on December 17th on Blu-ray & DVD, and a new documentary program "timelesz project -REAL-" would be distributed worldwide on Netflix in 2026. In addition, the August 24 "FAM" Shizuoka performance is scheduled to be streamed live on the Family Club Online page.

==== First number one single under the new formation ====
According to Oricon, who reported the fact on November 18, 2025, Timelesz's CD single "Steal The Show / Recipe", their first under the 8-men formation, reached the top spot. This makes it the group's 15th year hitting the top spot since the group's debut single released under the old name in 2011. It is also the first time their releases open at over 500,000 units sold in the first week, with 513,000 copies, surpassing the 336,000 of "Kimi ni Hitomebore", released on December 1, 2014 as Sexy Zone.

==== Television ====
Under the new formation, the group launched several eponymous variety shows. On April 20, 2025, Timelesz man began airing on Fuji TV's late-night time slot. The program focuses on the theme of "giving your all and sweating it out" to achieve dreams. In June 2025, their first Yomiuri TV program, Mirai hito ni nokoshitai! Furusato Timelesz capsule (未来人に残したい！ふるさとタイムレスカプセル), aired. The program focuses not on a physical time capsule, but in ways on how to leave things that impact future generations, culturally, gastronomically, and the sort. It was also aired on Sapporo TV, Chukyo TV, and Fukuoka Broadcasting Corporation. Their first TBS program, Timelesz no Jikan desu yo (timeleszの時間ですよ) had its first special in June 2025. The group is faced with "time" challenges, such as interview 100 people in a limited time. A second installment aired in October. This was followed by Nippon TV's late-night's Timelesz Familia (October 2025), where they face different challenges per week. In January 2026, the group hosted their first program on TV Asahi, titled Jidai chōetsu! Timelesz Ranking. The show features the members investigating the favorite historical warlords of different generations, with each member assigned to interview a specific age demographic ranging from teenagers to octogenarians.

In February 2026, their "Project" continues with Netflix's documentary Timelesz Project ~REAL~. In this occasion, the streamer follows the group behind the scenes of their first concert and their continued efforts to better themselves as a group.

On January 11, 2026, it was announced that Timelesz's programs Timelesz Man and Timelesz Familia were to change timeslot in Spring. Timelesz Man is expected to be moved from the 00:15 Tuesday slot to Fridays at 10:00 p.m., while Familia is expected to move from Mondays at 00:29 to Saturdays at 1:30 p.m. This makes Timelesz Man their first regular "Golden slot" program.

==== Yahoo Japan's number one search ====
The group was awarded the top rank in the 2025 Yahoo Search Awards in the musicians division. Among the searches related to the group that lead them to the top spot were "timelesz project -AUDITION-", their first single "Rock this Party", their appearance on "The Music Day", and their crown program "Timeless Man".

==== 2026–present ====
On March 5, they were announced as participants in the "JAL Sapporo Music Experience 2026" event, their appearance on April 19.

On September 19, 2026, member Inomata was arrested under suspicion of assault. After his arrest, Starto decided to put Inomata under probation, suspending his activities for the time being. As a consequence, both NTV (Timelesz Familia) and Fuji TV (Timelesz man) have decided to change the content of the programs scheduled to air on the 20 and 25, respectively. This has affected not only these programs, but also the appearances of the group on several "Silver Week" specials, as well as his own program on TV Asahi, Nika Game, scheduled for the 24. On October 1 2026, Starto Entertainment announced that they had revoked Inomata's exclusive contract, effective September 30. The same day, the remaining members offered a press conference, apologizing to fans, supporters and sponsors. Kikuchi mentioned concern and worry for the victim, and anger towards the former member's actions and wording. Regarding the future of Timelesz, he said that they never talked about disbanding, and that they will take this event to heart so that such sort of thing never happens again.

== Members ==
- Fuma Kikuchi (菊池風磨)
- Shori Sato (佐藤勝利)
- So Matsushima (松島聡)
- Taiki Shinozuka (篠塚大輝)
- Masaki Hashimoto (橋本将生)
- Takuto Teranishi (寺西拓人)
- Yoshitaka Hara (原嘉孝)

Former Timelesz members

- Shuto Inomata (猪俣周杜)

Former Sexy Zone members

- Kento Nakajima (中島健人)
- Marius Yo (マリウス葉)

== Discography ==
Studio albums
As Sexy Zone

- One Sexy Zone (2012)
- Sexy Second (2014)
- Sexy Power3 (2015)
- Welcome to Sexy Zone (2016)
- XYZ=Repainting (2018)
- Pages (2019)
- Pop × Step!? (2020)
- The Highlight (2022)
- Chapter II (2023)

As Timelesz

- Fam (2025)
- Momentum (2026)

== Filmography ==
=== Television ===
==== As Sexy Zone ====
- Yan Yan Jump (April 2011- TV Tokyo)
- Johnnys'Jr. land (October 2011- Sky Perfect TV)
- Waratte Iitomo! (November 3, 2011 Fuji TV)
- Music Station (November 11, November 18, 2011, April 27, 2012 TV Asahi)
- Sexy Zone Channel (start February 26, 2014) Fuji TV)
- ZIP
- Fuller House (December 22, 2017, Netflix)

==== As Timelesz ====
- timelesz project -Audition- (start September 13, 2024, Netflix)
- Nino san (first appearance as guests) (February 24, 2025)
- Geinōjin ga honki de kangaeta! Dokkiri GP (special, guests) (March 15, 2025)
- with Music (first appearance as musical guests) (March 8, 2025)
- Timelesz man (first eponymous variety show) (April 20, 2025)
- Mirai hito ni nokoshitai! Furusato Timelesz capsule (未来人に残したい！ふるさとタイムレスカプセル) (June 2025)
- Timelesz Familia (October 2025)
- Timelesz no Jikan desu yo (timeleszの時間ですよ) (June, October 2025)
- Jidai chōetsu! Timelesz Ranking (January 2026)
- Timelesz Project ~REAL~ (February 2026)
- Chikyū marugoto dai jikken: Nature Teacher (地球まるごと大実験 ネイチャーティーチャー) (July 2025) (Hara and Shinozuka, with Chocolate Planet)
- Unnashibito ~ timelesz ga happī o todokemasu ~ (運無人〜タイムレスがハッピーを届けます〜) (February 2026-)
- Taipa tai timelesz (タイパ対タイムレス) (March 2026–)

== Radio ==
=== As Sexy Zone ===
- Sexy Zone no Qrzone (2012-2024)
- Radirer! Saturday (2016-2019)
  - Radirer! Saturday New Year Special (2021, 2022)
- ''All Night Nippon Premium'' ("4-hour challenge" Sp, 2020)

=== As Timelesz ===
- Timelesz no Qrzone (2024- )
- All Night Nippon Premium (Original 3-member Sp) (February 3, 2025)
- Takuya Kimura Flow (5 new members guest appearance) (April 13, 20, 27, 2025)

== Commercials ==
- ABC-Mart
  - Climacool (collaboration with Adidas Japan) (May 2025-)
- Adidas Japan
  - Gradas 2.0
- Aoki Clothing Store
  - Formal / Pijama suits (2024, 3-original–member group) (2025, 8-person group)
- Google
  - Google Pixel (2026, members Taiki Shinozuka, Masaki Hashimoto, and Shuto Inomata)
- Inforich
  - ChargeSpot (2025–)
- Kakaku.com
  - Kyujin Box (2026, members Taiki Shinozuka, Masaki Hashimoto, and Shuto Inomata)
- Nissin Foods
  - Nissin Chikin Ramen (2025–, members Taiki Shinozuka, Masaki Hashimoto, and Shuto Inomata)
- Stella Seed
  - 8 The Thalasso (2025, 5–new–member group)
- Uber
  - Uber Eats (2026) members So Matsushima and Yoshitaka Hara, in collaboration with the 2nd season of Timelesz Project

== Awards ==
- GQ Japan Men of the Year 2025 ~Breakthrough Pop Icon Award~
