= Shori Sato =

Japanese singer and actor

- 佐藤 勝利
- Born: 30 October 1996 (age 29); Tokyo, Japan
- Occupations: Singer; actor; japanese idol
- Years active: 2010–present
- Agents: Johnny & Associates; Pony Canyon
- Website: sexyzone.ponycanyon.co.jp

Shori Sato (佐藤 勝利, Satō Shōri; born 30 October 1996) is a Japanese idol, actor, and member of the idol group timelesz, under Starto Entertainment. Sato entered Johnny & Associates on 30 October 2010.

== Biography ==
He was born on 30 October 1996. The youngest of four siblings, he has two brothers (7 and 5 years older) and a sister (9 years older). His given name, Shori, means "win" in Japanese. The name was given to him by his father who wished for him to win, achieve, and overcome anything.

During middle school, Shori was in the Field and Track Club and specialized in 3000m running. In his 3rd year, he became the captain of the club.

Sato participated in the Ford Island Bridge Run, held in Oahu, Hawaii, on April 7, 2012. His time was of 42 minutes 42 seconds, coming in at 5th spot in the "Male 15 to 19" category.

Shori started his primary school in April 2004 and enrolled at Megurogu State school, and graduated in 2010. In April 2010, he entered Meguro Kuritsu Dainana Junior High School and graduated in March 2013. In April 2013, he went to Horikoshi High School, a school known for the enrolment of Japanese celebrities. He graduated in March 2015 at the age of 18 years old.

At a press conference on the first day of Johnny's All Stars Island in January 2017, Shori announced that his father had died in September 2016, due to an illness at age 57.

== Career ==
Sato entered Johnny's office on October 30 2010.

On September 29, 2011, was the announcement of the formation of Sexy Zone and of their CD debut in November. Sato was named as one of the members.

First acting lead role was on Nippon Television's drama, 49, started on October 6, 2013.

Sato had a solo performance in the "Sexy Zone A.B.C – Z Summer Paradise in TDC" concert in 2015.

Sato performed in a solo concert called "Shori Sato's Solo Concert" in 2014. He repeated in 2015 ("Shori Sato's Summer Concert"), 2016 (Shori Sato's Summer Live 2016) and 2017.

His first lead role was in the movie Haruta & Chika, screened March 4, 2017.

He has played the ukulele, acoustic guitar, electric guitar and Taiko drums on the agency's concerts since he was a Junior. He also learned to play French horn for the Haruta & Chika movie. About it, he said "It's the most difficult wind instrument".

== Other activities ==
Sato's first solo photobook, called "A Bird on Tiptoe", that includes photos taken in Lisbon, Portugal; Taichung, Taiwan; and various places in Japan, was released on October 30, 2025.

== Filmography ==
=== Film ===
- Haruta & Chika (2017) as Haruta Kamijō
- Black Kōsoku (2019) as Sora Onoda
- Kyojo: Reunion (2026)
- Kyojo: Requiem (2026)

=== Television ===
==== Drama ====
- Hungry! (2012) as Sasuke Okusu
- Summer Nude (2013) as Shun Taniyama
- 49 (2013) as Dan Kagami
- Wagahai no Heya de Aru (2017) as bicycle (voice only)
- 99.9 Criminal Lawyer – SEASON II (2018) as Yūta Ozaki
- Miss Devil: Jinji no Akuma Tsubaki Mako (2018) as Hiroshi Saitō
- I Want to Hold Aono-kun so Badly I Could Die (2022) as Ryūhei Aono
- Apollo's Song (2025) as Shōgo Chikaishi
- Borderless ~kōiki idō sōsatai~ (2026) as Tsubomi Kizawa

==== Variety show ====
- Shonen Club (2018)
- Johnny's Jr Land
- Koisuru Ganbarebu (with other Sexy Zone members)
  - Koisuru Ganbarebu 2
  - Koisuru Ganbarebu 3
- Real Scope Hyper
- Gamushara! (2014)
- Sexy Zone Channel (Fuji TV, 2014)
- Timelesz Project
  - Timelesz Project -AUDITION- (2024, Netflix) (as part of timelesz)
  - Timelesz Project ~REAL~ (February 2026) (as part of timelesz)
- Timelesz man (first eponymous variety show) (April 20, 2025) (as part of timelesz)
- Mirai hito ni nokoshitai! Furusato Timelesz capsule (未来人に残したい！ふるさとタイムレスカプセル) (June 2025) (as part of timelesz)
- Timelesz Familia (October 2025) (as part of timelesz)
- Timelesz no Jikan desu yo (timeleszの時間ですよ) (June, October 2025) (as part of timelesz)
- Jidai chōetsu! Timelesz Ranking (January 2026) (as part of timelesz)
- Unnashibito ~ timelesz ga happī o todokemasu ~ (運無人〜タイムレスがハッピーを届けます〜) (February 2026-) (as part of timelesz)
- Taipa tai timelesz (タイパ対タイムレス) (March 2026–) (as part of timelesz)

==== Dubbing ====
- One Piece: Episode of Nami – Tears of a Navigator, and the Bonds of Friends (2012) as villager
- You, Fireworks, and Our Promise (2026) as Makoto Natsume

== Radio ==
- Victory Roads (since 6 October 2017, Bay FM)

== Solo concert ==
- 29 July and 11 August 2014 – Natsu Matsuri Special Event Sato Shori Solo Concert
- 11–14 August 2015 – Sexy Zone A.B.C-Z Summer Paradise in TDC – Sato Shori Solo Concert
- Johnny's Summer Paradise 2016 – Sato Shori Solo Concert (Sato Shori Summer Live 2016)
- 10-13 and 15 August 2017 – Johnny's Summer Paradise 2017 – Sato Shori Solo concert (Sato Shori Summer Live 2017 ~ Vic's Story)

== Commercials ==
- Sato Foods Co. Ltd.
  - Sato no Gohan (2026)
