= Kento Nakajima =

Japanese singer and actor (born 1994)

- 中島健人
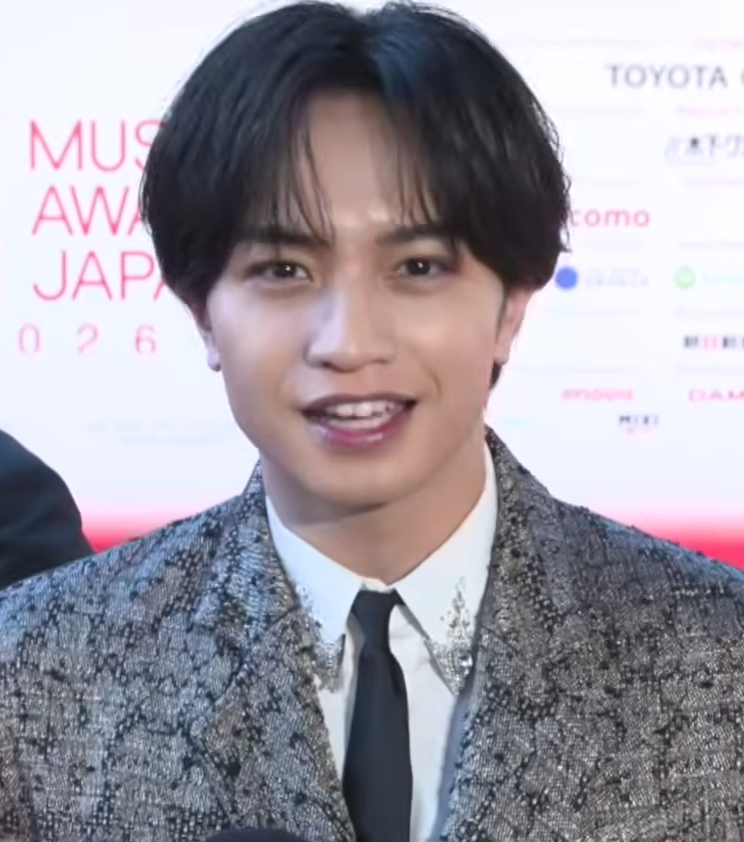
- Nakajima at the 2026 Music Awards Japan
- Born: March 13, 1994 (age 32); Tokyo, Japan
- Occupations: Singer; actor; voice actor; television personality
- Years active: 2008–present
- Agents: Starto Entertainment (2024–present); Smile-Up (2023–2024); Johnny & Associates (2008–2023)
- Musical career
- Genre: J-pop
- Instrument: Vocals
- Label: Sony Labels
- Member of: Gemn
- Formerly of: Sexy Zone; Yuma Nakayama w/B.I.Shadow
- Website: nakajimakento.com

Kento Nakajima (Japanese: 中島健人, Hepburn: Nakajima Kento; born March 13, 1994) is a Japanese singer, actor, voice actor and television personality under Starto Entertainment. He is best known as being a member of the Japanese idol groups Sexy Zone and Yuma Nakayama w/B.I.Shadow.

== Career ==
=== Early career ===
When he was in 6th grade, Nakajima listened to the song "Seishun Amigo" by Johnny & Associates temporary unit Shūji to Akira, formed by KAT-TUN's Kazuya Kamenashi and NEWS member Tomohisa Yamashita and became interested in Johnny's. At the age of 14 years old, he sent in his application, and joined the agency in April 2008

=== Pre debut and Sexy Zone era ===
In 2008, B.I.Shadow was formed as a Johnny's Jr. group. At that time the members were: Fuma Kikuchi, Misaki Takahata, and him. During that year, they acted in the drama Scrap Teacher.

He was chosen for the 5-member group Sexy Zone in 2011, when he was 17, which debuted in November 16 with the release of their eponymous debut single. Their average age was 14.4, making them the youngest group to debut since the Oricon Singles Rankings began in January 1968.

It was announced that Nakajima would leave the group on March 31, 2024, but continue in the agency as a talent and actor, seeking "to take on various challenges as an idol and an actor, both in Japan and abroad."

=== GEMN and other collaborations ===
As a singer, Nakajima released a single in 2024, in a collaboration with Tatsuya Kitani, as the unit GEMN. The single, titled "Fatal", served as the opening theme song for the second season of anime series Oshi no Ko. He also released a song as part of the "Hitogoto Project", "Hitogoto feat. Kento Nakajima", which serves as theme song for the TV Tokyo drama series "Shosen Hitogoto desu kara: Toaru Bengoshi no Honne no Shigoto" in which he appears.

On November 20, 2025, it was announced a collaboration with Mori Calliope of Hololive on the song called Gold Unbalance.

=== Solo era ===
Nakajima's solo debut was in December 25, 2024, with the release of the album N/bias. accompanied with his first solo live, "KENTO NAKAJIMA 1st Live 2025 N/bias" at the Ariake Arena in Tokyo on January 17–19, 2025.

On January 18, 2026, it was revealed that Nakajima would be singing the official cheer song for the 2026 Winter Olympics' Japanese team. Nakajima performed the song, Kesshō (結唱), at the "TEAM JAPAN farewell party" held at Lala Arena Tokyo Bay in Chiba on the 18th.

=== Acting career ===
Nakajima made his overseas debut as an actor in Hulu / SkyShowtime's drama Concordia, which started airing on May 23, 2024.

=== Other activities ===
==== YouTube and SNS ====
In a post dated October 17, 2024, Nakajima informed of the opening of official YouTube and TikTok accounts.

==== Brand ambassador ====
On January 8, 2026, it was announced that Nakajima was appointed as brand ambassador for Bulgari Japan

==== Special navigator ====
He was one of the chosen personalities to represent the network WOWOW during the broadcast of the Academy Awards, for which he studied English.

==== Event appearances ====
Nakajima appeared as guest on Kering's talk event Women in Motion in 2025.

== Personal life ==
Often fondly called "Kenty", Nakajima is an only child and was raised by his Filipino mother. He loves to play the piano and often performs it during their concerts. He updates his blog KenTeaTime or 'KTT' on Johnny's web everyday, reporting his daily life to his fans. He is a big fan of the manga Kimetsu no Yaiba. He coined the term "Sexy Lovers" or セクラバ (sekurabas) for Sexy Zone fans. He owns a toy poodle he named, "Bonita" or "Boni-chan".

He graduated with a bachelor's degree in Sociology at Meiji Gakuin University.

== Filmography ==
=== TV series ===
Year	Title	Role	Notes	Ref(s)
2008	Scrap Teacher	Kento Minobe		
2009	Koishite Akuma: Vampire Boy	Hiroto Handa		
2011	You Taught Me All the Precious Things	Kentaro Kodama		
2011	Umareru.	Koji Hayashida		
2012	Kazoku no Uta	Kosei Sakagami		
2013	Bad Boys J	Tsukasa Kiriki	Lead role	
2014	Kurofuku Monogatari	Akira Ogawa	Lead role	
2015	Defying Kurosaki-kun	Haruto Kurosaki	Lead role; miniseries	
2016	Guard Center 24	Mamoru Shinomiya	Lead role; television film	
2018	Cops' N Robbers	Tsutomu Madarame	Lead role	
2018	The Story of Shotaro Ishinomori, the Man Who Created a Hero	Shotaro Ishinomori	Lead role; 24 Hour Television film special	
2019	Castle of Sand (2019)	Eiryo Waga	Television film	
2020	Detective Novice	Kai Honma	Lead role	
2021	She Was Pretty (Japanese series)	Sousuke Hasebe	Lead role	
2023	Legal Enforcement with Dogs	Yūsuke Kurihara		
2024	Living-Room Matsunaga-san	Jun Matsunaga	Lead role	
2024	Concordia (drama)	Akira John "A.J." Ohba	Overseas drama debut	
2024	In the End, It's Someone Else's Problem	Osamu Yasuda		
2026	Song of the Samurai	Okada Izō		
2026	S and X	Ichito Shimotori	Lead role	

=== Variety and other programs ===
Year	Title	Notes	Ref(s)
2026	Nakajima Shigeoka Iwamoto no nakayoshi trio tabi taishi ni naritai!	National travel and promotion with the aim to become a tourism ambassador. Hosted with Daiki Shigeoka (West.) and Hikaru Iwamoto (Snow Man)	

=== Film ===
Year	Title	Role	Notes	Ref(s)
2013	Bad Boys J: The Movie	Tsukasa Kiriki	Lead role	
2014	Silver Spoon	Yūgo Hachiken	Lead role	
2016	The Black Devil and the White Prince	Haruto Kurosaki	Lead role	
2017	The Anthem of the Heart	Takumi Sakagami	Lead role	
2017	Teen Bride	Nao Tsurugi	Lead role	
2018	Nisekoi	Raku Ichijo	Lead role	
2022	Love Like the Falling Petals	Haruto Asakura	Lead role	
2022	Fragments of the Last Will	Takeo Shintani		
2023	Confess to Your Crimes	Kōji Uda	Lead role	
2025	My Beloved Stranger	Riku	Lead role	
2026	Love≠Comedy	Reiji Kanzaki	Lead role	

=== Animation series ===
Year	Title	Role	Notes	Ref(s)
2014	Silver Spoon	Aoyama	Episode 8	

=== Dubbing ===
- Transformers: Rise of the Beasts – Noah Diaz (Anthony Ramos)

== Discography ==
=== Studio albums ===
List of studio albums, with selected details, peak chart positions and sales
Title	Details	Peak positions			Sales
Title	Details	JPN	JPN Cmb.	JPN Hot	Sales
N / Bias	Released: December 25, 2024; Label: Sony Japan; Formats: CD+DVD, CD+BD, CD, DL, streaming	3	3	10	JPN: 50,490
Idol1st	Released: February 18, 2026; Label: Sony Japan; Formats: CD+DVD, CD+BD, CD, DL, streaming	1	1	1	JPN: 70,104

=== Singles ===
List of singles, showing year released, selected chart positions and album name
Title	Year	Peaks			Certifications	Album
Title	Year	JPN	JPN Cmb.	JPN Hot	Certifications	Album
"Fatal" (ファタール) (with Tatsuya Kitani as Gemn)	2024	5	2	3	RIAJ: Platinum (st.)	Dekai
"Hitogoto" (ヒトゴト) (as Hitogoto featuring Kento Nakajima)	2024	5	5	28		Non-album single
"Picaresque" (ピカレスク)	2024	—	—	— (Note: "Picaresque!" did not enter the Billboard Japan Hot 100, but peaked at number 20 on the Heatseekers Songs.)		N / Bias
"Montage" (with Hiroyuki Sawano)	2025	3	2	8		Idol1st
"Idolic"	2025	3	4	6		Idol1st
"XTC"	2026	—	—	67		Idol1st
"Gods' Play" (featuring Naomi Watanabe)	2026	—	—	—		Idol1st
"Onigoto" (鬼事)	2026	3	3	4		Non-album singles
"Fiction Love"	2026	3	3	—		Non-album singles
"—" denotes releases that did not chart or were not released in that region.

== See also ==
- Sexy Zone
- Yuma Nakayama w/B.I.Shadow
