= Timelesz discography =

- Studio albums: 11
- Compilation albums: 4
- Singles: 34
- Music videos: 47
- Concert videos: 15

Japanese boy band Timelesz (formerly Sexy Zone) has released eleven studio albums, two compilation albums, 27 singles, and 15 concert videos. Timelesz has also released 47 music videos.

== Albums ==
=== Studio albums ===
List of studio albums, with selected chart positions, certifications and sales
Title	Album details	Peak		Sales	Certifications	Notes and Ref.
Title	Album details	JPN	JPN Comb (Note: The Oricon Combined Albums Chart was established on December 24, 2018.)	Sales	Certifications	Notes and Ref.
One Sexy Zone	Released: 14 November 2012; Label: Pony Canyon; Formats: CD, CD+DVD	1	—	JPN: 110,000	RIAJ: Gold	
Sexy Second	Released: 19 February 2014; Label: Pony Canyon; Formats: CD, CD+DVD	1	—	JPN: 161,000	RIAJ: Gold	
Sexy Power3	Released: 11 March 2015; Label: Pony Canyon; Formats: CD, CD+DVD	1	—	JPN: 116,000	RIAJ: Gold	
Welcome to Sexy Zone	Released: 24 February 2016; Label: Pony Canyon; Formats: CD, CD+DVD	1	—	JPN: 127,000	RIAJ: Gold	
XYZ=Repainting	Released: 2 February 2018; Label: Pony Canyon; Formats: CD, CD+DVD	1	—	JPN: 162,000	RIAJ: Gold	
Pages	Released: 13 March 2019; Label: Pony Canyon; Formats: CD, CD+DVD	1	1	JPN: 145,000	RIAJ: Gold	
Pop × Step!?	Released: 5 February 2020; Label: Pony Canyon; Formats: CD, CD+DVD	1	1	JPN: 160,000	RIAJ: Gold	
The Highlight (ザ・ハイライト)	Released: 1 June 2022; Label: Top J; Formats: CD	1	1	JPN: 141,421	RIAJ: Gold	
Chapter II	Released: 7 June 2023; Label: Top J; Formats: CD	1	1	JPN: 159,097	RIAJ: Gold	Last as Sexy Zone
Fam	Released: 11 June 2025; Label: Over the Top; Formats: CD+DVD/Blu-ray (limited edition versions A, B, + bonus), 2-CD (regular edition)	1	1	JPN: 618,940	RIAJ: 2× Platinum	First as timelesz
Momentum	Released: 29 April 2026; Label: Top J; Formats: CD+DVD/Blu-ray (limited edition versions A, B, + bonus), 2-CD (regular edition)	1	1	JPN: 327,057	RIAJ: Platinum	Includes new unit songs, specific to each set

=== Compilation albums ===
List of compilation albums, with selected chart positions, certifications and sales
Title	Album details	Peak		Certifications	Sales	Notes and Ref
Title	Album details	JPN	JPN Comb (Note: The Oricon Combined Albums Chart was established on December 24, 2018.)	Certifications	Sales	Notes and Ref
Sexy Zone 5th Anniversary Best	Released: 16 November 2016; Label: Pony Canyon; Formats: CD, CD+DVD	1	—	RIAJ: Gold	JPN: 194,000	
SZ10th	Released: 3 March 2021; Label: Top J; Formats: CD, CD+DVD, CD+Blu-ray	1	1	RIAJ: Gold	JPN: 226,000	
Hello! We're Timelesz	Released: 28 February 2025; Label: Over the Top; Formats: Digital download, streaming	—	7			Songs from the Sexy Zone era
Hanabi ~ In the late summer night	Released: 30 November 2025; Label: Over the Top; Formats: Digital download, streaming	—	46			

== Extended play ==
Title	Release details	Peak chart positions		Sales	Certification	Notes and refs.
Title	Release details	JPN	JPN Comb	Sales	Certification	Notes and refs.
Timelesz	Release: 16 June 2024; Label: Over the Top; Content: Deluxe edition boxed package DVD includes music video and making-of video of new song; Limited edition DVD includes "Kanzen no plan!? Jibun-tachi de Tsukuru Tokuten Eizō in Chiba" homemade video; Standard edition CD	1	1	JPN: 99,525	RIAJ: Gold	Deluxe edition includes photo book, poster, "ID" card, sticker, trading card, and other extras.

== Singles ==
List of singles, with selected chart positions, certifications and sales
Title	Year	Peak			Certifications	Sales	Label	Album	Notes
Title	Year	JPN	JPN Comb (Note: The Oricon Combined Singles Chart was established on December 24, 2018.)	WW	Certifications	Sales	Label	Album	Notes
"Sexy Zone"	2011	1	—	—	RIAJ: Platinum	JPN: 283,000	Pony Canyon	One Sexy Zone	
"Lady Diamond"	2012	1	—	—	RIAJ: Gold	JPN: 145,000	Pony Canyon	One Sexy Zone	
"Sexy Summer ni Yuki ga Furu"	2012	1	—	—	RIAJ: Gold	JPN: 113,000	Pony Canyon	One Sexy Zone	
"Real Sexy!"	2013	1	—	—	RIAJ: Gold	JPN: 169,000	Pony Canyon	Sexy Second	
"Bad Boys"	2013	1	—	—	RIAJ: Gold	JPN: 169,000	Pony Canyon	Sexy Second	
"Bye Bye Dubai (See You Again)"	2013	1	—	—	RIAJ: Gold	JPN: 168,000	Pony Canyon	Sexy Second	
"A My Girl Friend"	2013	1	—	—	RIAJ: Gold	JPN: 168,000	Pony Canyon	Sexy Second	
"King & Queen & Joker"	2014	1	—	—	RIAJ: Gold	JPN: 173,000	Pony Canyon	Sexy Power3	
"Otoko Never Give Up"	2014	1	—	—	RIAJ: Gold	JPN: 143,000	Pony Canyon	Sexy Power3	
"Kimi ni Hitomebore"	2014	1	—	—		JPN: 348,000	Pony Canyon	Sexy Power3	
"Cha-Cha-Cha Champion"	2015	1	—	—	RIAJ: Gold	JPN: 132,000	Pony Canyon	Welcome to Sexy Zone	
"Colorful Eyes"	2015	1	—	—	RIAJ: Gold	JPN: 197,000	Pony Canyon	Welcome to Sexy Zone	
"Shōri no Hi made"	2016	1	—	—	RIAJ: Gold	JPN: 106,000	Pony Canyon	Sexy Zone 5th Anniversary Best	
"Yobisute"	2016	1	—	—	RIAJ: Gold	JPN: 130,000	Pony Canyon	XYZ=Repainting	
"Rock tha Town"	2017	1	—	—	RIAJ: Gold	JPN: 145,000	Pony Canyon	XYZ=Repainting	
"Gyutto"	2017	1	43	—	RIAJ: Gold	JPN: 153,000	Pony Canyon	XYZ=Repainting	
"Innocent Days"	2018	1	—	—	RIAJ: Gold	JPN: 170,000	Pony Canyon	Pages	
"Karakuri Darake no Tenderness"	2018	1	16	—	RIAJ: Gold	JPN: 202,000	Pony Canyon	Pages	
"Suppin Kiss"	2018	1	16	—	RIAJ: Gold	JPN: 202,000	Pony Canyon	Pages	
"Kirin no Ko"	2019	1	1	—	RIAJ: Gold	JPN: 191,000	Pony Canyon	Pop × Step!?	
"Honey Honey"	2019	1	1	—	RIAJ: Gold	JPN: 191,000	Pony Canyon	Pop × Step!?	
"Run"	2020	1	1	—	RIAJ: Platinum	JPN: 275,000	Top J Records	SZ10th	
"Not Found"	2020	1	1	—	RIAJ: Platinum	JPN: 266,000	Top J Records	SZ10th	
"Let's Music"	2021	1	1	—	RIAJ: Gold	JPN: 192,000	Top J Records	The Highlight	
"Natsu no Hydrangea"	2021	1	1	—	RIAJ: Platinum	JPN: 272,000	Top J Records	The Highlight	
"Trust Me, Trust You."	2022	1	1	—	RIAJ: Platinum	JPN: 225,309	Top J Records	Chapter II	
"Cream"	2023	1	1	—	RIAJ: Platinum	JPN: 227,474	Top J Records	Chapter II	
"Honne to Tatemae"	2023	1	1	—	RIAJ: Platinum	JPN: 226,022	Top J Records	Timelesz (EP)	
"Jinsei Yūgi"	2023	1	1	—	RIAJ: Gold	JPN: 196,883	Top J Records	Timelesz (EP)	
"Puzzle"	2024	1	1	—	RIAJ: Platinum	JPN: 277,608	Over the Top	Timelesz (EP)	Last as Sexy Zone
"Because"	2024	1	1	—	RIAJ: Platinum	JPN: 252,628	Over the Top	Fam	First as timelesz
"Rock This Party"	2025	—	10	132	RIAJ: Gold (st.)		Over the Top	Fam	Digital release
"Steal the Show"	2025	1	1	—	RIAJ: 2× Platinum	JPN: 512,609	Over the Top	"Momentum"	"Steal the Show/Recipe" CD Single
"Recipe"	2025	1	1	—	RIAJ: 2× Platinum	JPN: 512,609	Over the Top	"Momentum"	"Steal the Show/Recipe" CD Single
"Kienai Hanabi"	2026	1	1	—	RIAJ: Platinum	JPN: 425,212	Over the Top	TBA	

== Videography ==
=== Concert videos ===
List of concert videos, with selected chart positions and certifications
Title	Video details	Peak		Certifications	Notes and Ref.
Title	Video details	JPN DVD	JPN BD	Certifications	Notes and Ref.
Sexy Zone Arena Concert 2012	Released: 15 August 2012; Label: Pony Canyon; Formats: DVD, Blu-ray	1	2		
Johnny's Dome Theatre: Summary 2012 Sexy Zone	Released: 13 February 2013; Label: Pony Canyon; Formats: DVD, Blu-ray	2	1		
Sexy Zone Japan Tour 2013	Released: 28 August 2013; Label: Pony Canyon; Formats: DVD, Blu-ray	1	4		
Sexy Zone Spring Tour Sexy Second	Released: 12 August 2014; Label: Pony Canyon; Formats: DVD, Blu-ray	1	2		
Sexy Zone Summer Concert 2014	Released: 14 January 2015; Label: Pony Canyon; Formats: DVD, Blu-ray	2	2		
Sexy Zone Sexy Power Tour	Released: 9 September 2015; Label: Pony Canyon; Formats: DVD, Blu-ray	1	2		
Summer Paradise in TDC (Note: Digest of Sato Shori's "Shori Summer Concert", Nakajima Kento's "Love Ken TV", and Kikuchi Fuma's "Fu is a Doll" solo concerts.)	Released: 13 January 2016; Label: Pony Canyon; Formats: DVD, Blu-ray	1	2		
Welcome to Sexy Zone Tour	Released: 9 September 2016; Label: Pony Canyon; Formats: DVD, Blu-ray	1	2		
Johnnys' Summer Paradise 2016 (Note: Sato Shori's "Sato Shori Summer Live 2016", Nakajima Kento's "#HoneyButterfly", and Kikuchi Fuma's "Fu are you?" solo concerts. So Matsushima and Marius Yo's "Hey So! Hey Yo!: Summertime Memory" unit concert.)	Released: 25 January 2017; Label: Pony Canyon; Formats: DVD, Blu-ray	1	3		
Sexy Zone Presents Sexy Tour 2017: Stage	Released: 6 September 2017; Label: Pony Canyon; Formats: DVD, Blu-ray	1	1	RIAJ: Gold	
Summer Paradise 2017 (Note: Sato Shori's "Sato Shori Summer Live 2017: Vic's Story", Nakajima Kento's "Mission: K", and Kikuchi Fuma's "Fu is I?" solo concerts. So Matsushima and Marius Yo's "So What? Yolo" unit concert.)	Released: 18 July 2018; Label: Pony Canyon; Formats: DVD, Blu-ray	1	2		
Sexy Zone Repainting Tour 2018	Released: 9 January 2019; Label: Pony Canyon; Formats: DVD, Blu-ray	1	1	RIAJ: Gold	
Sexy Zone Live Tour 2019 Pages	Released: 28 August 2019; Label: Pony Canyon; Formats: DVD, Blu-ray	1	1	RIAJ: Gold	
Sexy Zone Pop×Step!? Tour 2020	Released: 10 February 2021; Label: Top J Records; Formats: DVD, Blu-ray	1	1	RIAJ: Gold	
We’re timelesz LIVE TOUR 2025-2026 episode 1 FAM	Release: 25 March 2026; Label: Top J Records; Formats: DVD, Blu-ray				First concert tour as 8. Videos from Tokyo Dome (disk 1) and Yokohama Arena (disk 2) performances. Disk 2 includes arena/dome backstage.

=== Music videos ===
List of music videos, showing title, year, and director
Title	Year	Director(s)	Notes and Ref.
"Sexy Zone"	2011	Unknown	
"Lady Diamond"	2012	Takuya Tada	
"Sexy Summer ni Yuki ga Furu"	2012	Takuya Tada	
"Real Sexy!"	2013	Masaki Takehisa	
"Bye Bye Dubai (See You Again)"	2013	Nobuyuki Tanii	
"We Gotta Go"	2014	Kanji Sutō	
"King & Queen & Joker"	2014	Takuya Tada	
"Otoko Never Give Up"	2014	Takuya Tada	
"Keep The Challenge"	2014	Taira Masui	
"Kimi ni Hitomebore"	2014	Takuya Tada	
"Let's Go To Earth"	2015	Takuya Tada	
"Maware Miracle"	2015	Takuya Tada	
"Seaside Love"	2015	Taira Masui	
"Cha-Cha-Cha Champion"	2015	Takuya Tada	
"Colorful Eyes"	2015	Takuya Tada	
"24-7 (Bokura no Story)"	2016	Tatsuya Murakami	
"Shōri no Hi made"	2016	Tatsuya Murakami	
"Yobisute"	2016	Hideaki Sunaga	
"Rock Tha Town"	2017	Taira Masui	
"Gyutto"	2017	Naokazu Mitsuishi	
"Wasurerarenai Hana"	2018	Tetsuo Inoue	
"Innocent Days"	2018	Naokazu Mitsuishi	
"Karakuri Darake no Tenderness"	2018	Takurō Ōkubo	
"Suppin Kiss"	2018	Takurō Ōkubo	
"La Sexy Woman"	2019	Yasuhiro Arafune	
"Kirin no Ko"	2019	Yoshiharu Seri	
"Honey Honey"	2019	Hideaki Fukui	
"Kyokutō Dance"	2020	Hideaki Sunaga	
"Run"	2020	Hidenobu Tanabe	
"Not Found"	2020	Hidenobu Tanabe	
"Right Next to You"	2021	Hidenobu Tanabe	
"Change the World"	2021	Sо̄ Yasui	
"Let's Music"	2021	Hidenobu Tanabe	
"Natsu no Hydrangea"	2021	Hidenobu Tanabe	
"Forever Gold"	2022		
"The finest" (animated)	2022		
"Trust me, trust you."	2022		
"Sleepless"	2022		
"Cream"	2023	Kazuaki Seki	
"Purple Rain"	2023		
"Purple Rain" (animated version)	2023		
"Honne to tatemae"	2023		
"Try this one more time"	2023		
"Jinsei yūgi"	2023		
"Puzzle"	2024		Last for Sexy Zone
"Anthem"	2024		timelesz (3 member)
"Dilemma" (animated)	2024		
"Because"	2024		
"Rock this Party"	2025		timelesz (8 member)
"One and Only"	2025		
"Steal The Show"	2025		
"Recipe"	2025		
"Good Together"	2026		
"Akubi" (8 members solo versions)	2026		

=== Other videos ===
Year	Name	Details	Ref.
2025	"Timelesz Project ~Audition~ Special Edition"	Release: December 17, 2025; BluRay, DVD	
