= Welcome to Sexy Zone =

Studio album by Sexy Zone
- Released: February 24, 2016
- Genre: J-pop
- Language: Japanese
- Label: Pony Canyon

Sexy Zone chronology
Sexy Power3 (2015)	Welcome to Sexy Zone (2016)	XYZ=Repainting (2018)

Welcome to Sexy Zone is the fourth studio album by Japanese boy band Sexy Zone, released by Pony Canyon on February 24, 2016. It debuted at the top of Oricon charts, selling 126,860 copies in 2016.

== Promotion and release ==
The album was announced in late 2015, along with its promotional tour. On December 24, Sexy Zone performed the singles "Cha-Cha-Cha Champion" and "Colorful Eyes" at the 66th NHK Kōhaku Uta Gassen.

== Track listing ==
No.	Title	Length
1.	"Welcome to Sexy Zone"
2.	"24-7 ~Bokura no Story~" (24-7～僕らのストーリー～)
3.	"Celebration!"
4.	"Cha-Cha-Cha Champion" (Cha-Cha-Cha チャンピオン)
5.	"Love Confusion"
6.	"Electric Shock"
7.	"Last winter’s night"
8.	"Sweety Girl"
9.	"Make my day"
10.	"Darenimo Hodokenai Mystery" (誰にも解けないミステリー)
11.	"But..."
12.	"Mr.Jealousy"
13.	"Easy come! Easy go! Easy love!"
14.	"Colorful Eyes" (カラフル Eyes)
15.	"Friend" (フレンド)
16.	"New Day"
17.	"You’re the only one"

Limited edition bonus disc
No.	Title	Length
1.	"Mujakina Jikan wa Sugi Yasuku" (無邪気な時間は過ぎやすく)

Limited edition DVD
No.	Title	Length
1.	"24-7 ~Bokura no Story~ Music Clip"
2.	"Making of「24-7~Bokura no Story~」Music Clip"
3.	"Make my day Image Clip"
4.	"Making of Jacket Shooting"
5.	"24-7 ~Bokura no Story~ Music Clip"
6.	"Iwai 5-Shūnen Totsunyū Kikaku! 4-Nen de Tamatta Bon'nō o Harae! Sōzetsu Sexy Tera Shugyō!?" (祝5周年突入企画！4年でたまった煩悩を祓え！壮絶Sexy寺修行！？)

== Charts ==
Chart (2016)	Peak position
Japanese Albums (Oricon)	1
Tower Records	3
