= Pages (Sexy Zone album) =

Studio album by Sexy Zone
- Released: March 13, 2019
- Genre: J-pop
- Language: Japanese
- Label: Pony Canyon

Sexy Zone chronology
XYZ=Repainting (2018)	Pages (2019)	Pop×Step!? (2020)

Pages is the sixth studio album by Japanese boy band Sexy Zone, released via Pony Canyon on March 13, 2019. It is the follow-up to their 2018 album XYZ=Repainting and is a concept album based around "one page of life" and expressing various emotions. It debuted at number one on both the Oricon Albums Chart and Billboard Japan's Hot Albums chart, selling over 120,000 copies in its first week.

== Release ==
Pages was released in three formats: two limited editions (A and B), and a regular edition. The regular edition includes a bonus disc with a solo song from each member, while limited edition A features a making-of and the music video for the first track "La Sexy Woman", and limited edition B features a DVD with Sexy Zone's "Lake Fuji Trip" documentary.

== Singles ==
The album features the Oricon Singles Chart number-one singles "Innocent Days" and "Karakuri Darake no Tenderness"/"Suppin Kiss".

== Track listing ==
No.	Title	Length
1.	"La Sexy Woman"
2.	"Koi ga Hajimaru yo!!!" (恋が始まるよー!!!; Love Will Begin!!!)
3.	"Suppin Kiss" (すっぴんKISS; Kiss Without Makeup)
4.	"Cry"
5.	"Make Me Bright"
6.	"Innocent Days" (イノセントデイズ)
7.	"Don't Run Away"
8.	"My Sweet Heart My Sweet Love"
9.	"Chiku Chiku Heart ～beating beating～" (チクチクハート～beating beating～)
10.	"Aoi Koibito" (青い恋人; Blue Lover)
11.	"Hands Up!"
12.	"Karakuri Darake no Tenderness" (カラクリだらけのテンダネス; Tenderness Full of Tricks)
13.	"Zenzen Kankeinai" (ゼンゼンカンケイナイ; It Doesn't Matter at All)
14.	"Wonder Love"
15.	"Kimi ga Ita Natsu ni..." (君がいた夏に・・・; In Summer When You Were...)
16.	"Itsumademo Itsumademo" (いつまでもいつまでも; Forever Forever)

Regular edition bonus disc
No.	Title	Length
1.	"Because of Ai" (Because of 愛; Because of Love) (Kento Nakajima)
2.	"Keep On" (Marius Yo)
3.	"Cocoa" (Fuma Kikuchi)
4.	"Fūkeiga" (風景画; Landscape Painting) (Shori Sato)

Limited edition type A DVD
No.	Title	Length
1.	"La Sexy Woman" (music clip)
2.	"Making of "La Sexy Woman" Music Clip & Jacket Shooting"

Limited edition type B DVD
No.	Title	Length
1.	"Sexy Zone Lake Fuji Trip～Engraving a New Page in Sexy Cycling!～" (Sexy Zone富士湖畔旅～Sexyサイクリングで新たな1PAGEを刻め!～)

== Charts ==
=== Weekly charts ===
Chart (2019)	Peak position
Japanese Albums (Oricon)	1
Japanese Hot Albums (Billboard Japan)	1

=== Year-end charts ===
Chart (2019)	Position
Japanese Albums (Oricon)	24
