= XYZ=Repainting =

Studio album by Sexy Zone
- Released: February 14, 2018
- Genre: J-pop
- Language: Japanese
- Label: Pony Canyon

Sexy Zone chronology
Welcome to Sexy Zone (2016)	XYZ=Repainting (2018)	Pages (2019)

XYZ=Repainting is the fifth studio album by Japanese boy band Sexy Zone, released via Pony Canyon on February 14, 2018. It debuted at the top of Oricon charts.

== Promotion and release ==
XYZ=Repainting was announced at the end of 2017. The album carries the themes of new beginnings and challenges, and the title means "to paint new colors in the Sexy Zone". It was released on three editions on February 14, 2018. In February 23, Sexy Zone featured on Music Station showcasing the singles "ROCK THA TOWN" and "Gyutto". The last was used as theme song of the drama Wagahai no Heya de Aru.

== Track listing ==
No.	Title	Length
1.	"XYZ"
2.	"Wasurerarenai Hana" (忘れられない花)
3.	"PEACH!"
4.	"ROCK THA TOWN"
5.	"Birthday for you"
6.	"Gyutto" (ぎゅっと)
7.	"Punpupunpun" (プンププンプン)
8.	"Fantasy ～1秒の奇跡～"
9.	"Mei Wakiyaku" (名脇役)
10.	"Yobisute" (よびすて)
11.	"Unreality"
12.	"Pheromone"
13.	"Love Magic" (ラブマジ)
14.	"Ignition Countdown"
15.	"Filter-goshi ni Mita Sora no Ao" (フィルター越しに見た空の青)
16.	"Saigo no Egao" (最後の笑顔)

Regular edition bonus disc
No.	Title	Length
1.	"Aitaiyo" (会いたいよ)
2.	"Luv Manifesto"
3.	"Kiss You Good-Bye"
4.	"Sing along song"
5.	"O.N.E ～Our New Era～"

Limited edition type A DVD
No.	Title	Length
1.	"Wasurerarenai Hana" (music clip)
2.	"XYZ=repainting Making Movie"

Limited edition type B DVD
No.	Title	Length
1.	"Hayama & Kamakura Sexy Zone 5-Person Trip ~Saikoro de Unmei ga Kimaru!? Gohōbi Sexy Gourmet Tour ~" (葉山・鎌倉 Sexy Zone 5人旅 ～サイコロで運命が決まる!?ごほうびSexyグルメツアー～（約93分収録）)

== Charts ==
=== Weekly charts ===
Chart (2019)	Peak position
Japanese Albums (Oricon)	1
Tower Records	1

=== Year-end charts ===
Chart (2018)	Position
Japanese Albums (Oricon)	24
